= IWA Mid-South King of the Deathmatch =

Professional wrestling tournament

The Independent Wrestling Association Mid-South King of the Deathmatch is an annual professional wrestling tournament running since 1997 in which a number of wrestlers compete in various deathmatches, in (for the most part) a single-elimination tournament which is similar to World Wrestling Entertainment's King of the Ring tournament. These tournaments include the typical weapons used in hardcore wrestling such as barbed wire, nails, thumbtacks, fire, and light tubes, and are known for their large amount of blood loss.

Notable entrants in the King of the Deathmatch tournaments have included Ian Rotten, Axl Rotten, Necro Butcher, Mad Man Pondo, Chris Hero, Balls Mahoney, Nick Mondo, and Mickie Knuckles. Many of the cards have also included non-tournament matches featuring top indy wrestlers such as Nigel McGuinness, Colt Cabana, CM Punk, Tracy Smothers, Homicide, Jerry Lynn, Jimmy Jacobs, Alex Shelley, Sonjay Dutt, B. J. Whitmer, Matt Sydal, Delirious, Arik Cannon, Ray Gordy, Low Ki, Daizee Haze and MsChif.

In 2006, IWA Mid-South introduced the concept of The Royal Weekend of Death, featuring the King of the Deathmatch tournament, as well as two new tournaments, the Queen of the Deathmatch and the Double Death Tag Team Tournaments. The 2006 & 2007 tournaments for Queen and Double Death happened in November on back to back nights, while the 2008 Queen of the Deathmatches took place on the afternoon of night 2 of King of the Deathmatches, with Double Death taking part on October 17 and 18. Notable participants of the Queen of the Deathmatch tournament include Mickie Knuckles, Lufisto, Annie Social, and Mike Levy.

== IWA Mid-South King of the Deathmatch Tournament ==
=== King of the Deathmatch 1997 ===
October 21, 1997 saw the first annual IWA Mid-South King of the Deathmatch Tournament, held at the National Guard Armory in New Albany, Indiana.

Competitors

- Ian Rotten
- Cash Flo
- Rollin' Hard
- Bull Pain
- Balls Mahoney
- War Machine #1
- War Machine #2
- Axl Rotten
- Mad Man Pondo
- Tower of Doom
- Doug Gilbert
- Ox Harley

==== Round one ====
1. Ian Rotten def. Cash Flo - Thumbtack Bat & Barbed Wire Boards Match
2. Rollin' Hard def. Bull Pain - Thumbtack Bat & Barbed Wire Boards Match
3. Balls Mahoney def. War Machine #1 - Barbed Wire Board & Barbed Wire Bat Match
4. Axl Rotten def. War Machine #2 - Four Corners of Pain Match
5. Mad Man Pondo def. Tower of Doom - Four Corners of Pain Match
6. Doug Gilbert def. Ox Harley - Barbed Wire Boards & Barbed Wire Bat Match

==== Semi-finals ====
1. Ian Rotten def. Rollin' Hard - Barbed Wire & Glass Spidernet Double Hell Match
2. Axl Rotten def. Balls Mahoney - FORFEIT
3. Doug Gilbert def. Mad Man Pondo - Barbed Wire & Glass Spidernet Double Hell Match

==== Final ====
1. Ian Rotten def. Axl Rotten^{†} - No Rope Barbed Wire, Electrified Light Tubes, Lights Out Death Match

^{†}Doug Gilbert refused to fight in the final

=== King of the Deathmatch 2000 ===
After a 3-year break, the tournament returned in 2000, this time running over two nights (October 20 and 21) at the House of Hardcore in Charlestown, Indiana. Non-tournament matches included Puppet def. T.O. in a Midget Thumbtack Match, and Brain Damage def. Toby Klein

Competitors

- 2 Tuff Tony
- Suicide Kid
- Todd Morton
- Alister Fear
- Axl Rotten
- Uncle Honkey
- Ian Rotten
- Mark Wolf
- Corporal Robinson
- Delilah Starr
- Rollin' Hard
- Cash Flo
- Richard X
- Manslaughter

==== Round one ====
1. 2 Tuff Tony def. Suicide Kid - Thumbtack Bat Thumbtack Death Match
2. Alister Fear def. Todd Morton - Thumbtack Bat Thumbtack Death Match
3. Manslaughter def. Richard X - Fans Bring the Weapons Match
4. Axl Rotten def. Uncle Honkey - Barbed Wire Bat and Barbed Wire Boards Match
5. Mark Wolf def. Ian Rotten - Barbed Wire Bat and Barbed Wire Boards Match
6. Corporal Robinson def. Delilah Starr - 4 Corners of Pain Match
7. Rollin' Hard def. Cash Flo - 4 Corners of Pain Match

==== Quarter-finals ====
1. Rollin' Hard def. Mark Wolf - Cactus Death Match
2. Manslaughter def. Axl Rotten - Barbed Wire Match
3. Corporal Robinson def. Cash Flo - Lumberjack Lighttubes Match
4. Alister Fear def. 2 Tuff Tony - Fans Bring the Weapons Match

==== Semi-finals ====
1. Rollin' Hard def. Alister Fear - No Rope Barbed Wire & Caribbean Spider Web Death Match
2. Corporal Robinson def. Manslaughter - No Rope Barbed Wire & Caribbean Spider Web Death Match

==== Finals ====
1. Rollin' Hard def. Corporal Robinson - Flaming Casket Death Match

=== King of the Deathmatch 2001 ===
King of the Deathmatch 2001 was held over 2 nights (June 1 & 2) at the House of Hardcore in Charlestown, Indiana.

Competitors

- Suicide Kid
- Richard X
- Uncle Honkey
- Mark Wolf
- Rollin Hard
- Deranged
- Tower of Doom
- Trent Baker
- Chris Hero
- Corporal Robinson
- Bull Pain
- Hido
- Axl Rotten
- Shank Dorsey
- Mean Mitch Page
- Paul E. Smooth
- 2 Tuff Tony
- Toby Klein
- Necro Butcher
- American Kickboxer
- Peter B. Beautiful
- Ian Rotten
- Cash Flo
- Sick Nick Mondo

==== Round one ====
1. Suicide Kid def. Richard X - Barbed Wire Bat Match
2. Mark Wolf def. Uncle Honkey - Barbed Wire Boards
3. Rollin Hard def. Deranged - Barbed Wire Boards
4. Trent Baker def. Tower of Doom - Thumbtack Match
5. Corporal Robinson def. Chris Hero - Thumbtack Match
6. Hido def. Bull Pain^{†} - Barbed Wire Bat Match
7. Axl Rotten def. Shank Dorsey - Barbed Wire Salt Death Match
8. Mean Mitch Page def. Paul E. Smooth - Barbed Wire Salt Match
9. 2 Tuff Tony def. Mr. Insanity - 4 Corners of Pain Match
10. Necro Butcher def. American Kickboxer - 4 Corners of Pain Match
11. Ian Rotten def. Peter B. Beautiful - Fans Bring the Weapons Match
12. Sick Nick Mondo def. Cash Flo - Fans Bring the Weapons Match

^{†}Hido injured his arm in this match and was unable to compete in the next round. Corporal Robinson received a bye as a result.

==== Quarter-finals ====
1. Suicide Kid def. Mark Wolf - Barbed Wire Tables Match
2. Rollin' Hard def. Trent Baker - Staple Gun Match
3. "Mean" Mitch Page def. Axl Rotten - Tapei Death Match
4. Necro Butcher def. 2 Tuff Tony - Staple Gun Match
5. Ian Rotten def. Sick Nick Mondo - Light Tube Tables & Fans Bring The Weapons Match

==== Semi-finals ====
1. Rollin' Hard def. Suicide Kid - Barbed Wire Taipei Salt Death Match
2. "Mean" Mitch Page def. Corporal Robinson - Balcony Death Match
3. Ian Rotten def. Necro Butcher - Flaming Tables Death Match

==== Finals ====
1. Ian Rotten def. Rollin Hard and "Mean" Mitch Page - House Of Pain Three Way Dance (200 light tubes covering the ropes and 3 log cabins of glass outside the ring)

=== King of the Deathmatch 2002 ===
King of the Deathmatch 2002 was held over 2 nights (July 12 & 13) at the IWA Arena in Clarksville, Indiana. Non-tournament matches included Chris Hero def. Colt Cabana (Night One) and Chris Hero def. Colt Cabana and Tracy Smothers (Night Two)

Competitors

- Chuck E. Smooth
- Mad Man Pondo
- Adam Gooch
- Nate Webb
- Ian Rotten
- Hugh Rogue
- Corporal Robinson
- Alister Fear
- Mitch Page
- Dave Donovan
- Necro Butcher
- Mark Wolf
- Dysfunction
- Rollin' Hard
- 2 Tuff Tony
- Cash Flo

==== Round one ====
1. Nate Webb def. Chuck E. Smooth - Staple Gun Match
2. Mad Man Pondo def. Adam Gooch - Barbed Wire Bat Match
3. Ian Rotten def. Hugh Rogue - Fans Bring The Weapons Death Match
4. Corporal Robinson def. Alister Fear - Lighttubes Lumberjack Match
5. Mitch Page def. Dave Donovan - Fans Bring The Weapons Match
6. Necro Butcher def. Mark Wolf - Barbed Wire Boards Match
7. Dysfunction def. Rollin' Hard - Texas Barbed Wire Salt Match
8. 2 Tuff Tony def. Cash Flo - Thumbtack Bat & Barbed Wire Boards Match

==== Quarter-finals ====
1. Dysfunction def. Corporal Robinson - Taipei Death Match
2. 2 Tuff Tony def. Ian Rotten - Electrified Lighttubes Match
3. Necro Butcher def. Mitch Page - Fans Bring The Weapons Death Match
4. Nate Webb def. Mad Man Pondo - Barbed Wire Tables & Lighttubes Tables Death Match

==== Semi-finals ====
1. Nate Webb def. Dysfunction - Barbed Wire Canvas Match
2. Necro Butcher def. 2 Tuff Tony - Log Cabins of Glass Match

==== Finals ====
1. Necro Butcher def. Nate Webb - No Ropes Barbed Wire, Electrified Lightbulbs, Fluorescent Lightbulb, House of Pain Caribbean Spiderweb, Barbed Wire Board & Pool of Lobsters Match

=== King of the Deathmatch 2003 ===
King of the Deathmatch 2003 was held over 2 nights (August 1 & 2) at the IWA Arena in Clarksville, Indiana. Non-tournament matches included:
Night One - Jerry Lynn def. Jimmy Jacobs, Mickie Knuckles' debut match (and victory) against Hailey Hatred, Chris Hero def. Homicide (IWA-MS World title match)
Night Two - Sonjay Dutt & Adam Flash def. Alex Shelley & Jimmy Jacobs and Nate Webb & M-Dogg 20, Bull Pain vs Jim Fannin (no contest), Nigel McGuinness def. Colt Cabana, Homicide def. B. J. Whitmer, Danny Daniels def. Chris Hero (Texas Death Match for the IWA-MS World title), The Messiah def. Corporal Robinson (CZW World Heavyweight Title)

Competitors

- Mad Man Pondo
- Nate Webb
- Mitch Page
- Rollin' Hard
- Balls Mahoney
- Horace the Psychopath
- J. C. Bailey
- 2 Tuff Tony
- Axl Rotten
- Corporal Robinson
- Nick Gage
- Dysfunction
- Necro Butcher
- Toby Klein
- Ian Rotten
- The Messiah

==== Round one ====
1. Mad Man Pondo def. Nate Webb - High Impact Tables Match
2. Mitch Page def. Rollin Hard - Taipei Death Match
3. Balls Mahoney def. Horace the Psychopath - Barbed Wire Boards & Barbed Wire Bat Match
4. J.C. Bailey def. 2 Tuff Tony - Electrified Light Tubes & Barbed Wire Tables Match
5. Axl Rotten def. Corporal Robinson - Fans Bring the Weapons Match
6. Nick Gage def. Dysfunction - 4 Corners of Pain Match
7. Necro Butcher def. Toby Klein - Fans Bring the Weapons Match
8. Ian Rotten def. The Messiah - East Coast Thumbtacks Death Match

==== Quarter-finals ====
1. Mad Man Pondo def. Axl Rotten - Light Tube Tables Match
2. J.C. Bailey def. Necro Butcher - Light Tube Coffin Match
3. Nick Gage def. Mitch Page - Barbed Wire Canvas & Light Tube Ropes Match
4. Ian Rotten def. Balls Mahoney - Fans Bring the Weapons Match

==== Semi-finals ====
1. J.C. Bailey def. Ian Rotten - Fans Bring the Weapons Match
2. Mad Man Pondo def. Nick Gage - Bed of Nails & Caribbean Spider Web Match

==== Finals ====
1. Mad Man Pondo def. J.C. Bailey - Barbed Wire Ropes, House of Horrors Steel Cage Match

=== King of the Deathmatch 2004 ===
King of the Deathmatch 2004 was held over 2 nights (June 25 & 26) at the Oolitic Community Center in Oolitic, Indiana. Non-tournament matches included:
Night One - Danny Daniels & B. J. Whitmer def. Matt Sydal & Delirious, CM Punk def. Ray Gordy, Chris Hero def. Arik Cannon
Night Two - MsChif def. Mickie Knuckles and Daizee Haze, Delirious def. Matt Sydal (IWA-MS Light Heavyweight title match), Chris Hero & Homicide def. Ray Gordy & B. J. Whitmer

Competitors

- Low Life Louie
- Homicide
- Ryan Boz
- Smokey C
- Trik Davis
- Tank
- Deranged
- Manslaughter
- Ian Rotten
- Nate Webb
- Corporal Robinson
- Dysfunction
- Mad Man Pondo
- JC Bailey
- Toby Klein
- Necro Butcher

==== Round one ====
1. Low Life Louie def. Homicide - Barbed Wire Boards Match
2. Ryan Boz def. Smokey C - Barbed Wire Boards Match
3. Manslaughter def. Trik Davis - Thumbtack Death Match
4. Tank def. Deranged - Four Corners of Pain Match
5. Ian Rotten def. Nate Webb - Fans Bring the Weapons Death Match
6. Corporal Robinson def. Dysfunction - 2 out of 3 Log Cabins of Glass Match
7. Mad Man Pondo def. J.C. Bailey - Fans Bring the Weapons Death Match
8. Toby Klein def. Necro Butcher - Fans Bring the Weapons Death Match

==== Quarter-finals ====
1. Low Life Louie def. Ryan Boz - Unlucky 13 Staple Gun Match
2. Corporal Robinson def. Ian Rotten - Barbed Wire Ropes Lighttubes & Pool Of Rubbing Alcohol
3. Tank def. Deranger - Barbed Wire Ropes & Fans Bring the Weapons Death Match
4. Toby Klein def. J.C. Bailey† - Electrified Light Tubes Match

^{†}Deranged replaced Manslaughter and J.C Bailey replaced Mad Man Pondo

==== Semi-finals ====
1. Corporal Robinson def. Low Life Louie - Fans Bring the Weapons Match
2. Toby Klein def. Tank - Fans Bring the Weapons Match

==== Finals ====
1. Corporal Robinson def. Toby Klein - House of Pain Glass Death Match

=== King of the Deathmatch 2005 ===
King of the Deathmatch 2005 was held over 2 nights (November 18 & 19) at the Capital Sports Arena in Plainfield, Indiana. Non-tournament matches included:
Night One - Jimmy Jacobs def. C.J. Otis (IWA-MS World title), Hailey Hatred def. Mickle Knuckles (IWA-MS Women's title), Matt Sydal & Delirious def. The Iron Saints
Night Two - Ian Rotten & Mickie Knuckles & Delirious & C.J. Otis def. Sal & Vito & Brandon Thomaselli & Josh Abercrombie, Danny Havoc def. Hellaware Assassin and Brandon Prophet in a Fans Bring the Weapons Match

Competitors

- J. C. Bailey
- Nate Webb
- Josh Abercrombie
- Mitch Page
- Nick Gage
- Tank
- Brain Damage
- Bull Pain
- Deranged
- The Hellaware Assassin
- Hillbilly Jed
- Corporal Robinson
- Necro Butcher
- Brandon Prophet
- Toby Klein
- Dysfunction
- Danny Havoc
- Mad Man Pondo

==== Round one ====
1. J.C. Bailey & Nate Webb def. Josh Abercrombie - Three Way Tables & Thumbtacks Steel Cage
2. Mitch Page & Tank def. Brain Damage - Three Way Unlucky 7 Staple Gun
3. Bull Pain & Deranged def. Hillbilly Jed - Three Way Barbed Wire Ropes & Barbed Wire Boards Match
4. Corporal Robinson & Necro Butcher def. Brandon Prophet - Three Way Barbed Wire Ropes, Fans Bring the Weapons Match
5. Toby Klein & Dysfunction def. Danny Havoc - Three Way Barbed Wire Ropes, Fans Bring the Weapons Match
6. Mad Man Pondo & Nick Gage def. The Hellaware Assassin - Three Way Taipei Death Gloves, & Fans Bring the Weapons Match

The first round matches held on day one were all three-way dances with two competitors from each match advancing to the quarter-finals.

==== Quarter-finals ====
1. J.C. Bailey def. Dysfunction - Barbed Wire Ropes & Barbed Wire Canvas Match
2. Mitch Page def. Nate Webb - Barbed Wire Ropes & Light Tube Tables Match
3. Deranged def. Mad Man Pondo - Barbed Wire Ropes, 2/3 Light Tube Log Cabins Match
4. Toby Klein def. Corporal Robinson - Barbed Wire Ropes & Light Tube Ropes Match
5. Bull Pain def. Nick Gage - Barbed Wire Ropes, Light Tube Ropes & 4 Corners of Pain Match
6. Necro Butcher def. Tank - Barbed Wire Ropes, Light Tube Ropes & Fans Bring the Weapons Match

==== Semi-finals ====
1. J.C. Bailey def. Mitch Page - Barbed Wire Ropes, Light Tube Ropes & Fans Bring the Weapons Match
2. Toby Klein def. Deranged - Barbed Wire Ropes, Light Tube Ropes & Fans Bring the Weapons Match
3. Necro Butcher def. Bull Pain - Barbed Wire Ropes, Light Tube Ropes & Fans Bring the Weapons Match

==== Finals ====
1. Toby Klein def. J.C. Bailey & Necro Butcher - Three Way 200 Light Tubes Match

=== King of the Deathmatch 2006 ===
King of the Deathmatch 2006 was held over 2 nights (June 2 & 3) at the Capital Sports Arena in Plainfield, Indiana. Non-tournament matches included:
Night One - Darrin Corbin def. Arik Cannon (IWA-MS World title)
Night Two - Trik Davis def. Arik Cannon and Darrin Corbin (IWA-MS World title), The Children of Pain (Jacob Ladder & Darin Childs) def. Insane Lane & Juggulator in a Flaming Tables Match

Competitors

- Drake Younger
- Dustin Lee
- Flash Flanagan
- Billy Black
- Dysfunction
- Dinn T. Moore
- Deranged
- Spidar Boodrow
- Mitch Page
- J-Boy
- Toby Klein
- Jacob Ladder
- Brain Damage
- Darin Childs
- Ian Rotten
- Brandon Prophet
- Insane Lane
- Corporal Robinson
- Juggulator
- Mad Man Pondo
- WHACKS
- Tank
- Bull Pain
- Mickie Knuckles
- Rollin' Hard^{†}
- JC Bailey^{†}
- Hardcore Craig^{†}

^{†}Prior to the tournament, three Bunkhouse Battle Royals were held at IWA Mid-South events, with the winners being awarded a bye in the first round. Rollin' Hard won a bye at April Bloodshowers 2006 on April 21, JC Bailey won a bye at Any Given Saturday on April 22, and Hardcore Craig won a bye at Spring Heat 2006 on May 19

==== Round one ====
1. Drake Younger def. Dustin Lee - Light Tube Corners Steel Cage Match
2. Flash Flanagan def. Billy Black - Thumbtack Death Match
3. Dysfunction def. Dinn T. Moore - 4 Corners of Pain Match
4. Deranged def. Spidar Boodrow - Barbed Wire Ropes & Barbed Wire Boards Match
5. Mitch Page def. J-Boy - Barbed Wire Ropes, Tabasco, Salt & Lemon Juice Match
6. Toby Klein def. Jacob Ladder - Taipei Death Match
7. Brain Damage def. Darin Childs - Unlucky 13 Staple Gun Match
8. Ian Rotten def. Brandon Prophet & Insane Lane - Three Way Dance Fans Bring The Weapons Match
9. Corporal Robinson def. Juggulator - Fans Bring The Weapons Match
10. Mad Man Pondo def. WHACKS - Fans Bring The Weapons Match
11. Tank vs. Bull Pain ended in a draw - Barbed Wire Dog Collar Match

==== Quarter-finals ====
1. Dysfunction def. Flash Flannigan - Barbed Wire Tables & Ladder Steel Cage Match
2. Corporal Robinson def. Mad Man Pondo - Electrified Light Tubes Match
3. J.C. Bailey def. Drake Younger - Bare-Foot Thumbtack Death Match
4. Mitch Page def. Rollin' Hard - Light Tube Ropes & Pool of Leeches Match
5. Ian Rotten def. Mickie Knuckles - Fans Bring The Weapons Match
6. Toby Klein def. Brandon Prophet^{†} - 2/3 Light Tube Log Cabins Match
7. Tank def. Bull Pain - Light Tube Lumberjack Match
8. Brain Damage def. Deranged - Fans Bring The Weapons Match

^{†}Brandon Prophet replaced Hardcore Craig

==== Semi-finals ====
1. Dysfunction def. Ian Rotten - Barbed Wire Ropes & Pool of Rubbing Alcohol Match
2. Mitch Page def. J.C. Bailey - Barbed Wire Ropes & Pool of Lobsters Match
3. Brain Damage def. Tank - Barbed Wire Ropes, Fans Bring the Weapons Match
4. Toby Klein def. Corporal Robinson - Barbed Wire Ropes, Fans Bring the Weapons Match

==== Finals ====
1. Mitch Page def. Dysfunction, Brain Damage & Toby Klein - 200 Light Tube House of Pain Total Elimination Death Match

=== King of the Deathmatch 2007 ===
King of the Deathmatch 2007 was held over 2 nights (June 22 & 23) at the Capital Sports Arena in Plainfield, Indiana. Non-tournament matches included:
Brandon Thomaselli def. Low Ki (IWA-MS Light-Heavyweight title), The Naptown Dragons def. Southern Rock in a Circle City Street Fight, Insane Lane & Danny Havoc def. Rollin Hard & Mitch Page and Fukimoto & Deranged in a three-way tag match (Mitch Page's retirement match)

Competitors

- Mickie Knuckles
- Tank
- Necro Butcher
- Rollin' Hard
- Mad Man Pondo
- Scotty Vortekz
- Drake Younger
- Kenji Fukimoto
- Dysfunction
- Danny Havoc
- Freakshow
- Mitch Page
- Brain Damage
- Insane Lane
- Corporal Robinson
- Deranged

==== Round one ====
1. Mickie Knuckles def. Tank - Barbed Wire Ropes & Barbed Wire Baseball Bats Match
2. Necro Butcher def. Rollin' Hard - Taipei Death Match
3. Mad Man Pondo def. Scotty Vortekz - Staple Gun, 4 Corners of Pain Match
4. Drake Younger def. Kenji Fukimoto - Barbed Wire Ropes, Thumbtack Insanity Match^{†}
5. Dysfunction def. Danny Havoc - Tables, Ladder, Chairs & Light Tubes Barbed Wire Steel Cage Match
6. Freakshow def. Mitch Page - Home Run Derby Death Match
7. Brain Damage def. Insane Lane - Fans Bring The Weapons Match
8. Corporal Robinson def. Deranged - Fans Bring The Weapons Match

^{†}Drake Younger put the IWA Mid-South Deathmatch Championship up for this match, and retained

==== Quarter-finals ====
1. Corporal Robinson def. Mad Man Pondo - Electrified Light Tubes Match
2. Brain Damage def. Mickie Knuckles - Fans Bring The Weapons Match
3. Dysfunction def. Drake Younger - Barbed Wire Boards & Barbed Wire Baseball Bat Match^{†}
4. Freakshow def. Necro Butcher - Fans Bring The Weapons Match

^{†}Drake Younger put the IWA-MS Deathmatch title up for this match and lost, making Dysfunction the new champion

==== Semi-finals ====
1. Corporal Robinson def. Dysfunction - London Bridge Death Match^{†}
2. Freakshow def. Brain Damage - Hot Coals & Lit Cigarettes Match

^{†}Dysfunction put the IWA-MS Deathmatch title up for this match and lost, making Corporal Robinson the new champion

==== Finals ====
1. Corporal Robinson def. Freakshow - No Rope Barbed Wire & 200 Light Tubes Death Match^{†}

^{†}Corporal Robinson put the IWA-MS Deathmatch title up for this match, and retained

=== King of the Deathmatch 2008 ===
King of the Deathmatch 2008 took place over 2 nights (June 20 & 21) in the parking lot of Alley Cats Lanes bowling alley in Sellersburg, Indiana, and was an 18-man tournament.

Non-tournament matches on Night One included Sara Del Rey defeating Mickie Knuckles, Dingo defeating Chuck Taylor for the IWA-MS Heavyweight Title, and Jimmy Jacobs and Tyler Black defeating Egotistico Fantastico and "Mr. Insanity" Toby Klein.

Non-tournament matched on Night Two included Jason Hades defeating Bryan Skyline to retain the IWA Mid-South Light Heavyweight Championship, Dingo's first successful IWA-MS Heavyweight Title defence against Toby Klein, and a four-way match during which Tank defeated Corey Shaddix, WHACKS and Viper.

Competitors

- Ian Bloody
- Corey Shaddix
- Devon Moore
- Tank
- Insane Lane
- Deranged
- WHACKS
- Danny Havoc
- Nick Gage
- Freakshow
- Viper
- Mad Man Pondo
- CJ Otis
- Darin Childs
- Scotty Vortekz
- Drew Lucid
- Dustin Lee
- Drake Younger

==== Round one ====
The Round One matches were all three-way matches, with the first person pinned or submitting was eliminated from the tournament.

1. Ian Bloody and Devon Moore def. Corey Shaddix - Fans Bring The Weapons Match
2. CJ Otis and Darin Childs def. Drew Lucid - Electrified Light Tubes Match
3. Danny Havoc and Nick Gage def. WHACKS - Light Tubes and Ladders Match
4. Freakshow and Mad Man Pondo def. Viper - Light Tube Bundles Match
5. Insane Lane and Deranged def. Tank - Fans Bring The Weapons Match
6. Dustin Lee and Scotty Vortekz def. Drake Younger - Barbed Wire Madness Match

==== Quarter-finals ====
1. Devon Moore def. Ian Bloody - Death From Above Match
2. Insane Lane def. CJ Otis - 4 Corners of Pain Match
3. Derangeddef. Darin Childs - Unlucky 13 Staple Gun Match
4. Dustin Lee def. Mad Man Pondo - Fans Bring The Weapons Match
5. Danny Havoc def. Scotty Vortekz - Barefoot Thumbtacks, Bottle Caps, and Broken Glass Match
6. Nick Gage def. Freakshow - Taped Fist Texas Death Match

==== Semi-finals ====
1. Danny Havoc def. Deranged and Insane Lane - Cinder Block Match
2. Devon Moore def. Nick Gage and Dustin Lee - Pyramids of Pain Match

==== Final ====
1. Devon Moore def. Danny Havoc - 200 Light Tube, No Rope Barbed-Wire Scaffold Match

=== King of the Deathmatch 2009 ===
The Eleventh King of the Deathmatch tournament took place at the Hartman Recreation Center in Joliet, Illinois, over 2 nights: March 6, 2009 and March 7, 2009.

Competitors

- Masada
- Tank
- Necro Butcher
- Dysfunction
- Mad Man Pondo
- Thumbtack Jack
- Corporal Robinson
- Viper
- Nick Gage
- Danny Havoc
- D. J. Hyde
- Nate Webb
- xOMGx
- Devon Moore
- Elkview Adam
- Bull Pain

==== Round one ====
1. xOMGx def. Devon Moore - Barbed Wire Ladders, Barbed Wire Tables & Caribbean Spider Web Match
2. Danny Havoc def Elkview Adam - Barefoot Shit You Don't Want To Step On Death Match (Mouse Trap Board & Christmas Ball Caps)
3. Dysfunction def. Viper - Barbed Wire Canvas & Light Bulbs Match
4. Mad Man Pondo def. Nate Webb - Bed of Nails and Anything With Nails On Them Match
5. Corporal Robinson def. D. J. Hyde - Thumbtack Madness Match
6. Masada def. Tank - Barbed Wire Boards, Barbed Wire Ladder & Taipei Death Match
7. Thumbtack Jack def Nick Gage - Deep Six Death Match (No Rope Barbed Wire, Fish Hooks & Chains)
8. Necro Butcher def. Bull Pain - No Rope Barbed Wire, Broken Glass Caribbean Spider Web Match

==== Semi-finals ====
1. Dysfunction def. xOMGx - Home Run Derby Death Match
2. Thumbtack Jack def. Mad Man Pondo - Fans Bring The Weapons Match
3. Necro Butcher def. Danny Havoc - Home Improvement Death Match
4. Masada def. Corp. Robinson - Light Tubes, Cinder Blocks with Glass & Hot Coals Match

==== Final ====
1. Masada def. Necro Butcher, Thumbtack Jack, and Dysfunction - Fatal 4-Way Double Ring, No Ropes Barbed Wire, Gigantic Fans Bring The Weapons, 30 Minutes Anything Goes Iron Man Death Match

=== King of the Deathmatch 2010 ===
The twelfth KOTDM was held over 2 nights: Friday, June 4, 2010, and Saturday, June 5, 2010, in Bellevue, Illinois, at the Bellevue Plaza.

In non-tournament action one night one, Johnathon Gresham defeated Drake Younger and Jimmy Jacobs in a 3-way dance and American Kickboxer stopped by on his bike ride from Ohio to California to raise concussion awareness. In non-tournament action on night two, Markus Crane def. Simon Sezz; Tyler Black def. Johnathon Gresham and gains entry into TPI 2010; and the Hooligans and Matt Cage def. Necro Butcher, Michael Faith, and Chuey Martinez.

Confirmed Competitors

- Mason Cutter
- Devon Moore
- Necro Butcher
- Balls Mahoney
- J. C. Bailey
- Mitch Page
- Ian Rotten
- Neil Diamond Cutter
- Bull Pain
- Devin Cutter
- Michael Fayne
- Kyle Threat
- Chuey Martinez†
- Whacks
- Simon Sezz
- Nick Gage

==== Round 1 ====
1. Devon Moore def. Mason Cutter - Thumbtack Kickpads and Gloves on a Pole Match
2. Bull Pain def. Kyle Threat - Homerun Derby
3. Mitch Page def. Simon Sezz - Homewrecker Death Match
4. Balls Mahoney def. Michael Faith - Fan Brings The Weapons Match
5. Neil Diamond Cutter def. Devin Cutter - 4 Corners of Pain Match
6. Whacks def. Chuey Martinez - Loose Light Tubes Match
7. Nick Gage def. Necro Butcher - Bar Room Brawl
8. J.C. Bailey def. Ian Rotten - No Ropes Barb Wire Light Tubes Match

==== Quarter-finals ====
1. Neil Diamond Cutter def. Whacks - Log Cabin Light Tubes Match
2. J.C. Bailey def. Nick Gage - Barbwire Strap Match
3. Balls Mahoney def. Bull Pain - "You Swing Yours I'll Swing Mine" Match‡
4. Devon Moore def. Mitch Page - Fans Bring The Weapons Match

==== Semi-finals ====
1. Devon Moore def. Neil Diamond Cutter - Barbwire Dog Collar Match
2. J.C. Bailey def. Balls Mahoney - Texas Death Match

==== Finals ====
1. J.C. Bailey def. Devon Moore - No Ropes Barbwire, Electrified Light Tubes, and Pits of Hell Match

†Chuey Martinez wrestled with a broken leg.

‡Balls Mahoney's Chairs vs. Bull Pain's Bat Match

=== King of the Deathmatch 2011 ===
The 13th KOTDM was held in Bellevue, Illinois, on Friday, September 16 to September 17 at the Bellevue Plaza. In non-tournament action B. J. Whitmer def. Bucky Collins to claim the vacated Light Heavyweight Title on night 1. On night 2, Bucky Collins defeated Markus Crane, Neil Cutter, Devin Cutter, and Joey Grunge beat Reed Bentley, Juicy Jimmy Feltcher, and Damian Payne in a 6 Man (Losers From Night 1) Tag Match, and B. J. Whitmer def. Masada.

Confirmed Competitors

- Matt Tremont
- Reed Bentley
- Simon Sezz
- Drake Younger
- Devon Moore
- Masada
- Little Mondo
- Neil Diamond Cutter
- Pinkie Sanchez
- Freakshow
- Juicy Jimmy Feltcher
- Mason Cutter
- Damian Payne
- Joey Grunge
- Devin Cutter
- Markus Crane

==== Round 1 ====
1. Pinkie Sanchez def. Juicy Jimmy Feltcher - Fans bring the Thumbtacks and Thumbtack Weapons Challenge Match
2. Freakshow def. Joey Grunge - Home Run Derby Match
3. Simon Sezz def. Damian Payne - Pop My Cherry Death Match
4. Mason Cutter def. Devin Cutter - Caribbean Spider Web Glass Death Match
5. Rory Mondo def. Reed Bentley - TLC 4 Corners of Pain Match
6. Devon Moore def. Markus Crane - Hardcore Aerial Assault Match
7. Matt Tremont def. Masada - Barbwire Board, Tai Pai, Sandpaper Kickpads Match
8. Drake Younger def. Neil Diamond Cutter - Fans Bring The Weapons Match

==== Round 2 ====
1. Devon Moore def. Pinkie Sanchez - 4 Corners of Hell Match
2. Drake Younger def. Mason Cutter - World Series of Glass Match
3. Simon Sezz def. Rory Mondo - "Death Becomes Us" Match
4. Matt Tremont def. Freakshow - Fans Brings The Weapons Match

==== Finals ====
1. Drake Younger def Devon Moore, Simon Sezz and Matt Tremont - No Rope Barbed Wire, 250 Light Tubes, Tables and Ladder Match

=== King of the Deathmatch 2014 ===
Was held June 28, 2014 as part of a doubleheader titled "Royal Day of Death" at the Rustic Frog in New Albany, Indiana.

Confirmed Competitors

- Bull Bronson
- Christian Skyfire
- Corporal Robinson
- Devon Moore
- Freakshow
- Jesse Fuckin' Amato
- John Wayne Murdoch
- Josh Crane
- Matt Tremont
- Mitch Page
- Suicide Kid
- Ron Mathis

==== Non-Tournament Match ====
1. B. J. Whitmer & Michael Elgin def. The Hooligans (Devin Cutter & Mason Cutter)

==== Round 1 ====
1. Josh Crane def. Christian Skyfire - Barefoot BLT Match (Bulbs, Legos & Tacks)
2. Mitch Page def. Suicide Kid - Hot Coals, Panes of Glass Match
3. Ron Mathis def. Devon Moore - Barbed Wire Tables and Ladders Match
4. John Wayne Murdoch (w/ Jason Saint) def. Bull Bronson - Bed of Nails and Carpet Strips Match
5. Corporal Robinson def. Freakshow - Fans Bring the Weapons Match
6. Matt Tremont def. Jesse Fuckin' Amato - World Series of Glass, Best of 7 Log Cabin Match

==== Round 2 ====
1. Josh Crane def. Mitch Page and Corporal Robinson - Broken Beer Bottles and Light Tubes Match
2. Matt Tremont def. Ron Mathis and John Wayne Murdoch - Fans Bring the Weapons, Spider Net Match

==== Finals ====
1. Matt Tremont def Josh Crane - Barbed Wire Rope, Panes of Glass, Light Tubes, Barbed Wire Board, Casket, and Fans Bring the Weapons Match

=== King of the Deathmatch 2015 ===
Was held June 26 through 27, 2015 at the American Legion Post#335 in Clarksville, Indiana.

Confirmed Competitors

- Nick Gage
- John Wayne Murdoch
- Bryant Woods
- Devon Moore
- SeXXXy Eddy
- The Green Phantom
- Insane Lane
- JD Horror
- Dale Patricks
- Reed Bentley
- MASADA
- TANK
- Markus Crane
- Adam Bueller
- Corporal Robinson
- Matt Tremont

==== Round 1 ====
1. JD Horror def. Bryant Woods - Fans Bring The Weapons Match
2. Devon Moore def. Reed Bentley - TLC X2 Match (Tables, Tacks, Ladders, Lighttubes, Chairs, Candles)
3. Dale Patricks def. Adam Bueller - Barefoot Fishhooks, Syringes, Carpet Strips, and Tubes Match
4. John Wayne Murdoch def. Corporal Robinson - Feel The Burn Match (Coals, Rubbing Alcohol, Lit Cigarettes, Tabasco Sauce)
5. Nick Gage def. Markus Crane - Venus Fly Trap Match
6. Matt Tremont def. TANK - Texas Bullrope, Barbed Wire Boards and Cactus Pits Match
7. MASADA def. The Green Phantom - Caribbean Spider Web Match
8. Sexxxy Eddy def. Insane Lane - Homerun Derby Death Match

==== Quarter finals ====
1. John Wayne Murdoch def. Devon Moore - Circus Death Match
2. Nick Gage def. Sexxxy Eddy - Unlucky 13 Staple Gun Match
3. Masada def. Dale Patricks - Cinderblocks and Lighttubes Match
4. Matt Tremont def. JD Horror - World Series of Glass Match

==== Semi-finals ====
1. John Wayne Murdoch def. Nick Gage - Home Improvement Death Match
2. Matt Tremont def. Masada - Fans Bring the Weapons Match

==== Final ====
1. Matt Tremont def. John Wayne Murdoch - House of Horrors Death Match w/ Toby Klein as the Guest Referee

=== King of the Deathmatches 2016 ===
Was held on August 6, 2016, at the Pride Bar in New Albany, Indiana.

Confirmed Competitors

- John Wayne Murdoch
- Bryant Woods
- Devon Moore
- Jeff Cannonball
- Rickey Shane Page
- D. J. Hyde
- Conor Claxton
- Dale Patricks
- Reed Bentley
- Matt Tremont
- Joseph Schwartz
- Deadly Dale
- Josh Crane
- Marcus Crane
- Jeff King
- Brad Crash

==== Round 1 ====
1. John Wayne Murdoch def. Jeff King, Deadly Dale, Conor Claxton - Fans Bring the Weapons Match
2. Dale Patricks def. Markus Crane, Josh Crane, Rickey Shane Page - Barbed Wire Boards, Pits of Gusset Plates, Pits of Alcohol Match
3. Matt Tremont def. Jeff Cannonball, Brad Cash, Bryant Woods - 100 Light Tubes Match
4. D. J. Hyde def. Devon Moore, Reed Bentley, Joseph Schwartz - 4 Corners of Pain, Carpet Strips & Fish Hook Ropes Match

==== Semi-finals ====
1. Matt Tremont def. Dale Patricks - World Series of Glass Match
2. John Wayne Murdoch def. The Lariat God" D. J. Hyde - Home Run Derby Match

==== Finals ====
1. John Wayne Murdoch def. Matt Tremont - House of Horrors Match

=== King of the Deathmatches 2017 ===
Was held on May 20, 2017, at the Flea Market in Memphis, Indiana.

Confirmed Competitors

- John Wayne Murdoch
- Rickey Shane Page
- G-Raver
- LuDark Shaitan
- Nick Depp
- Mance Warner
- Masada
- Devon Moore
- Bryant Woods
- Dale Patricks
- Markus Crane
- Aidan Blackheart
- Brad Crash
- Jeff King
- Reed Bentley
- Eric Ryan

==== Non-Tournament Matches ====
1. Marcus Everett def. Cole Radrick - Singles Match
2. Jake Crist def. Eddie Kingston and Shane Mercer (w/ Jason Saint) - Three Way Match

==== Round 1 ====
1. John Wayne Murdoch def. Ludark Shaitan and Nick Depp and Reed Bentley - Home Run Derby/Light Tube Fence Match
2. Dale Patricks def. Aidan Blackhart and Eric Ryan and Markus Crane - Fans Bring the Weapons Match
3. Devon Moore def. G-Raver and Jeff King and Mance Warner - Log Cabins of Glass & Four Corners of Pain Match
4. Rickey Shane Page def. Brad Cash and Bryant Woods and Masada - Great American Barbecue Deathmatch

==== Semi-finals ====
1. John Wayne Murdoch def. Dale Patricks - Barefoot Carpet Strips, Gusset Plates and Thumbtacks Death Match
2. Rickey Shane Page def. Devon Moore - Kevin Hogan Box Of Death, Barbed Wire Boards, Taipei Match

==== Finals ====
1. Rickey Shane Page def. John Wayne Murdoch - House of Horrors Death Match

=== King of the Deathmatch 2018 ===
Was held May 18 through 19, 2018 at the Flea Market in Memphis, Indiana. In non-tournament action Dale Patricks def. Bryant Woods and G-Raver in a 3-Way Match at night 2.

Confirmed Competitors

- Nick Gage
- John Wayne Murdoch
- Aeroboy
- Markus Crane
- Dale Patricks
- SHLAK
- Eric Ryan
- Rickey Shane Page
- G-Raver
- Miedo Xtremo
- Ciclope
- Neil Diamond Cutter
- Mike Roach
- JC Rotten
- Amazing Maria
- Devon Moore
- Bryant Woods
- Conor Claxton

==== Round 1 ====
1. Devon Moore and John Wayne Murdoch def. Amazing Maria - Barbed Wire Bat, Barbed Wire Board and Loose Tubes Match†
2. Conor Claxton and Rickey Shane Page def. Bryant Woods - Taipei Death 4 Corners Of Pain Match
3. JC Rotten and Nick Gage def. Mike Roach - Home Run Derby Match
4. Aeroboy and SHLAK def. Eric Ryan - Gusset Plate Chairs, Lightube Doors and Loose Tubes Match
5. Neil Diamond Cutter and Miedo Xtremo def. Dale Patricks - Stairway To Hell (Barbed Wire Ladder, Pits of Coals and Pits of Tubes) Match
6. Ciclope and Markus Crane def. G-Raver - Fans Bring The Weapons Match

†John Wayne Murdoch put the IWA-MS World Heavyweight title up for this Match, and retained.

==== Quarterfinals ====
1. Ciclope def. Aeroboy and Miedo Xtremo - Gussett Plates Madness Match
2. Rickey Shane Page and JC Rotten and Neil Diamond Cutter - Shopping Cart Death Match
3. Nick Gage def. John Wayne Murdoch and SHLAK - Fans Bring The Weapons Match†
4. Markus Crane def. Conor Claxton and Devon Moore - Lightubes and Cinder Blocks Death Match

†John Wayne Murdoch put the IWA-MS World Heavyweight title up for this match and lost, making Nick Gage the new champion.

‡All quarterfinals matches were Total Elimination.

==== Semi-finals ====
1. Rickey Shane Page def. Markus Crane - World Series of Glass (Lightubes Edition) Match
2. Nick Gage def. Ciclope - World Series of Glass (Mirrors Edition) Match†

†Nick Gage put the IWA-MS World Heavyweight title up for this match, and retained.

==== Final ====
1. Nick Gage def. Rickey Shane Page - House of Horrors Death Match†

†Nick Gage put the IWA-MS World Heavyweight title up for this match, and retained.

=== King of the Deathmatch 2020 ===
Was held July 31 through August 1, 2020 in Connersville, Indiana.

Confirmed Competitors

- John Wayne Murdoch
- Rickey Shane Page
- Aeroboy
- JC Rotten
- Jeff King
- SHLAK
- Orin Veidt
- Eric Ryan
- Shane Mercer
- Eddy Only
- BC Killer
- Casanova Valentine
- Jimmy Lloyd
- Tristen Ramsey
- Dale Patricks
- Josh Crane

==== Non-Tournament Matches ====
Night 1:

- Jake Crist (/w JT Davidson) defeated Ace Perry (c) & Kevin Giza - IWA Mid-South Heavyweight Championship Match

Night 2:

- Shane Mercer def. Gary Jay - Singles Match:
- Josh Crane def. Slade Porter - Singles Match
- Jake Crist(c) (/w JT Davidson) def. Lincoln Moseley - IWA Mid-South Heavyweight Championship
- Aaron Williams def. Chris Dickinson - No Holds Barred Match
- Tristen Ramsey def. Eddy Only, Casanova Valentine & BC Killer - Four Way Fans Bring The Weapons Match

==== Round 1 ====
1. Rickey Shane Page def. JC Rotten - Barbed Wire Madness, Stairway To Hell Match
2. Dale Patricks def. Josh Crane - Barefoot Bad Landing Death Match
3. Jeff King def. Eddy Only - Desert Storm Taipei Death Match
4. Shlak def. Casanova Valentine - Fans Bring The Weapons Match
5. Aeroboy def. Tristen Ramsey - Death From Above Match
6. Orin Veidt def. Jimmy Lloyd - World Series Of Electrified Lighttubes Match
7. Eric Ryan def. BC Killer - Glass Galore Texas Death Match
8. John Wayne Murdoch def. Shane Mercer - No Rope Barbed Wire, Caribbean Spider Web, Double Hell Death Match

==== Quarterfinals ====
1. Shlak def. Rickey Shane Page - Final Construction Death Match
2. John Wayne Murdoch def. Jimmy Lloyd - Medieval Death Match
3. Eric Ryan def. Jeff King - Panes of Glass Match
4. Dale Patricks def. Aeroboy - High Impact Tables Death Match

==== Semi-finals ====
1. Eric Ryan def. John Wayne Murdoch - Glass Castle Death Match
2. Shlak def. Dale Patricks - Carnival Death Match

==== Final ====
1. Eric Ryan def. Shlak - Barbed Wire Cage, House of Horrors Match

=== King of the Deathmatch 2021 ===
Was held on July 30 through July 31, 2021 at the Southside Turners in Indianapolis, Indiana.

Confirmed Competitors

- Rickey Shane Page
- Shane Mercer
- SHLAK
- Insane Lane
- Eric Ryan
- Neil Diamond Cutter
- John Wayne Murdoch
- Orin Veidt
- Atticus Cogar
- Aeroboy
- Mance Warner
- Masada
- Kevin Giza
- Casanova Valentine
- Logan James
- Dale Patricks
- Otis Cogar
- Bam Sullivan
- Ian Rotten
- Bobby Beverly
- Jeff Cannonball
- Rebecca Payne
- Jake Crist
- Dan O'Hare

==== Round 1 ====
1. Mance Warner def. Bobby Beverly - Barbed Wire Madness, Texas Bullrope Death Match
2. Bam Sullivan def. Rickey Shane Page - Everything Including The Kitchen Sink Death Match
3. SHLAK def. Insane Lane - World Series Of Glass Death Match
4. Logan James def. Rebecca Payne - Homerun Derby Death Match
5. Eric Ryan def. Shane Mercer - Four Corners of Pain Death Match
6. Neil Diamond Cutter def. Jake Crist - Taipei Double Hell Death Match
7. Atticus Cogar def. Dan O'Hare - Lighttube Bundles, Call Of The Wild Death Match
8. Otis Cogar def. Jeff Cannonball - You've Got Me Pins, Needles & Nails Death Match
9. Aeroboy def. Dale Patricks - Death From Above Match
10. John Wayne Murdoch def. Ian Rotten - Fans Bring The Weapons Death Match
11. Orin Veidt def. Casanova Valentine - In Through The Out Door Death Match
12. MASADA def. Kevin Giza - It's Electrified Death Match

==== Quarterfinals ====
1. MASADA def. Mance Warner and SHLAK - Chains & Panes Death Match
2. Aeroboy def. Bam Sullivan and Logan James - Wire Nets, Tubes & Panes Death Match
3. Orin Veidt def. John Wayne Murdoch and Otis Cogar - Dry Ice Open Box Fans Death Match
4. Eric Ryan def. Atticus Cogar and Neil Diamond Cutter - Glass Everywhere Death Match

==== Semi-finals ====
1. Orin Veidt def. Aeroboy - Pits of Glass And Cut Cans Death Match
2. Eric Ryan def. MASADA - Construction Death Match

==== Final ====
1. Eric Ryan def. Orin Veidt - House Of Horrors Death Match

=== King of the Deathmatch 2022 ===
Would have been held on August 19 through August 20, 2022 at the Summit Park District in Summit, Illinois however, IWA-MS shut down before the tournament could be held.

Announced Competitors

- John Wayne Murdoch
- Aeroboy
- Eric Ryan
- Kevin Giza
- Orin Veidt
- Dale Patricks
- The Carver
- Tank
- MASADA
- The Hoodfoot
- “Sad Boy" Michael Caden
- Callen Butcher
- Bobby Beverly
- Neil Diamond Cutter
- Jimmy Chondo Lyon
- Bam Sullivan
- Satu Jinn
- Hello Hardbody
- Remington Rhor
- Jeff Cannonball
- Otis Cogar
- Danny DeManto
- Tommy Vendetta
- “Bulldozer” Matt Tremont

== IWA Mid-South Queen of the Deathmatch Tournament ==
=== Queen of the Deathmatch 2006 ===
November 3, 2006 saw the first annual IWA Mid-South Queen of the Deathmatch Tournament, held at the Capital Sports Arena in Plainfield, Indiana.

Competitors

- Mickie Knuckles
- Ann Thraxxx
- Rachel Putski
- Vanessa Kraven
- SeXXXy Eddy^{†}
- Amy Lee
- Mayumi Ozaki
- Sumi Sakai

^{†}Amy Lee was scheduled to fight LuFisto in the first round, who had pulled out due to a hand injury sustained fighting Necro Butcher in a Canadian Death Match tournament called Bloodstock put on by Stranglehold Wrestling. SeXXXy Eddy was brought in as a last minute replacement.

==== Quarter-finals ====
1. Mickie Knuckles def. Ann Thraxxx - Unlucky 13 Staple Gun Death Match
2. Rachel Putski def. Vanessa Kraven - Thumbtack Death Match
3. SeXXXy Eddy def. Amy Lee - Four Corners of Pain Death Match
4. Mayumi Ozaki def. Sumi Sakai - Barbed Wire Ropes & Barbed Wire Boards Death Match

==== Semi-finals ====
1. Mickie Knuckles def. Rachel Putski - Taipei Death Match
2. Mayumi Ozaki def. SeXXXy Eddy - 2 out of 3 Log Cabins of Glass Death Match

==== Final ====
1. Mickie Knuckles def. Mayumi Ozaki - No Rope Barbed Wire, Electrified Light Tube Fans Bring The Weapons Steel Cage Death Match

=== Queen of the Deathmatch 2007 ===
October 27, 2007 saw the second annual IWA Mid-South Queen of the Deathmatch Tournament, again held at the Capital Sports Arena in Plainfield, Indiana. This card also included a 2007 Revolution Strong Style Tournament Qualifying Match between CJ Otis and Deranged.

Competitors

- LuFisto
- B.B. Walls
- Roxie Cotton
- Storm
- Mickie Knuckles
- Misty Heat

==== Quarter-finals ====
1. LuFisto def. B.B. Walls and Roxie Cotton - Barbed Wire Ropes & Thumbtack Death Match Three Way Dance
2. Storm def. Mickie Knuckles and Misty Heat - Barbed Wire Ropes & Barbed Wire Baseball Bat Death Match Three Way Dance

==== Semi-finals ====
1. Mickie Knuckles def. B.B. Walls - Barbed Wire Ropes & Deathmatch Bats (Loser's Bracket)
2. Roxie Cotton def. Misty Heat - Barbed Wire Ropes & Barbed Wire Ladder Death Match (Loser's Bracket)
3. LuFisto def. Storm - Barbed Wire Ropes & Four Corners of Pain Death Match (Winner's Bracket)
4. Mickie Knuckles def. Roxie Cotton - Barbed Wire Ropes & Taipei Death Match (Loser's Bracket)

==== Final ====
1. LuFisto def. Mickie Knuckles - No Rope Barbed Wire & Electrified Light Tubes Death Match

=== Queen of the Deathmatch 2008 ===
June 21, 2008 saw the third annual IWA Mid-South Queen of the Deathmatch Tournament, held in the parking lot of Alley Cats Lanes bowling alley in Sellersburg, Indiana. Once again there were last minute changes to the competitors, leading to a 6-woman tournament, with the winner of the first round match between Mickie Knuckles and "Glasses" Jones being awarded a bye into the Final.

Competitors

- Mickie Knuckles
- Annie Social
- Rachel Summerlyn^{†}
- Rebecca Payne
- "Glasses" Jones
- Monique Mercy

Note: LuFisto had been announced as taking part, but has withdrawn due to flight schedule issues.
^{†}Rachel Summerlyn wrestled in the 2006 QOTDM as Rachel Putski

==== Quarterfinals ====
1. Rachel Summerlyn def. Annie Social - Thumbtack Death Match
2. Mickie Knuckles def. "Glasses" Jones - Unlucky 13 Staple Gun Death Match
3. Rebecca Payne def. Monique Mercy - Fetish Death Match

==== Semi-finals ====
1. Mickie Knuckles def. "The White Lion" Mike Levy - Fans Bring The Weapons Match^{†}
2. Rebecca Payne def. Rachel Summerlyn - Barbed Wire Madness Match

==== Final ====
1. Rebecca Payne def. Mickie Knuckles - Fans Bring the Weapons, Taipei Deathmatch

^{†} Mike Levy came to the ring complaining that he had not been given a slot in either of the Deathmatch Tournaments, so Mickie agreed to wrestle him in the semi-finals. During the match Levy "no sold" Mickie's offence, leading to a legitimate beatdown from Ian Rotten, Devon Moore, John Calvin, Tank and others.

=== Queen of the Deathmatch 2014 ===
Was held June 28, 2014 as part of a doubleheader titled "Royal Day of Death" at the Rustic Frog in New Albany, Indiana. In non-tournament action LuFisto beats Jordynne Grace(with Rodney Rush).

Competitors

- Heidi Lovelace
- Hudson Envy
- Mistress Burgundy
- Randi West
- Thunderkitty
- Jewells Malone
- Kiki Rose
- LuDark Shaitan

==== Quarterfinals ====
1. Heidi Lovelace def. Hudson Envy - Tacks, Ladders & Canes Death Match
2. Randi West def. Mistress Burgundy - Glass Death Match
3. Thunderkitty def. Jewells Malone - Barbed Wire Dog Collar & Cat O' Nine Tails On a Pole Death Match
4. LuDark Shaitan def. Kiki Rose - Barefoot Four Corners of Pain Death Match

==== Semi-finals ====
1. Randi West def. Thunderkitty - Bats With Shit On Them Death Match
2. LuDark Shaitan def. Heidi Lovelace - Fans Bring the Weapons Death Match

==== Final ====
1. Randi West def. LuDark Shaitan - Four Corners of Pain Death Match

=== Queen of the Deathmatch 2015 ===
Was held June 27, 2015 as part of a doubleheader at the American Legion Post#335 in Clarksville, Indiana.

Competitors

- Kathy Owens
- Ludark Shaitan
- Sage Sin Supreme
- Thunderkitty
- Mistress Burgandi
- Randi West
- Sabrina Sixx

==== Quarter-finals ====
1. Sage Sin Supreme def. Thunderkitty - Tai Pei Death and Barbed Wire Boards Death Match
2. Kathy Owens def. Sabrina Sixx- Four Corners of Pain Death Match
3. Ludark Shaitan def. Mistress Burgandi- Tacks, Carpet Strips, Barb Wire Bundles and Light Tube Ropes Death Match

==== Semi-finals ====
1. Kathy Owens def. Sage Sin Supreme - Fans Bring the Weapons Death Match
2. Ludark Shaitan def. Randi West - Home Run Derby Match†

†Randi West received a bye to round 2 because her opponent Rebecca Payne no showed the show.

==== Final ====
1. Ludark Shaitan def. Kathy Owens - Gusset Plates With Pools of Rubbing Alcohol Death Match

=== Queen of the Deathmatch 2021 ===
Will be held November 6, 2021 at German Park in Indianapolis, Indiana.

Competitors

- Sage Sin
- Lilith Grimm
- Gabby Gilbert
- Ludark Shaitan
- Kasey Kirk
- Sarahdox
- Amazing Maria
- Rebecca Payne

==== Quarter-finals ====
1. Ludark Shaitan def. Gabby Gilbert - Deadlier Homes and Gardens Match
2. Sage Sin def. Lilith Grimm - Trick or Teeth Death Match
3. Kasey Kirk def. Sarahdox - Barefoot 4 Corners of Pain Match
4. Rebecca Payne def. Amazing Maria - The Whole SHEbang Match

==== Semi-finals ====
1. Ludark Shaitan def. Kasey Catal - Death Match
2. Rebecca Payne def. Sage Sin - Death Match

==== Final ====
1. Rebecca Payne def. Ludark Shaitan - Death Match

=== Queen of the Deathmatch 2022 ===
Will be held on August 20, 2022, at the Summit Park District in Summit, Illinois.

Competitors

- Rebecca Payne
- Jewells Malone
- Lilith Grimm
- Ludark Shaitan
- Sage Sin Supreme
- Vixsin
- Gabby Gilbert
- Mother Endless
- Mariah Moreno
- Lindsay Snow
- Sarahdox
- Amazing Maria

==== Quarter-finals ====
1. ??? vs. ??? - ??? Match
2. ??? vs. ??? - ??? Match
3. ??? vs. ??? - ??? Match
4. ??? vs. ??? - ??? Match

==== Semi-finals ====
1. ??? vs. ??? - ??? Match
2. ??? vs. ??? - ??? Match

==== Final ====
1. ??? vs. ??? - House of Horrors Match

== IWA Mid-South Double Death Tag Team Tournament ==
=== Double Death Tag Team Tournament 2006 ===
November 4, 2006 saw the first annual IWA Mid-South Double Death Tag Team Tournament, held at the Capital Sports Arena in Plainfield, Indiana. This was the first tournament of its type to be held in the United States, where both members of a team have to be eliminated. The card also included a non-tournament match in which SeXXXy Eddy & Jagged def. Mitch Ryder & Chuck Taylor.

Competitors

- Old & Younger (Ian Rotten and Drake Younger)
- Naptown Dragons (Diehard Dustin Lee and Scotty Vortekz)
- Tough Crazy Bastards (Necro Butcher and Toby Klein)
- Hugh Rogue and Chuey Martinez
- Insane Lane and Freakshow
- Dysfunction and Corporal Robinson
- Mad Man Pondo and 2 Tuff Tony
- Children of Pain (Jacob Ladder and Darin Childs)

==== Quarter-finals ====
1. Older & Younger def. Naptown Dragons - TLC & Lighttubes Steel Cage Match
2. Tough Crazy Bastards def. Hugh Rogue & Chuey Martinez - Barbed Wire Boards & Bar Room Brawl
3. Dysfunction & Corporal Robinson def. Insane Lane & Freakshow - Taipei Death & Shit That Hurts When You Get It In Your Cuts Match
4. Mad Man Pondo & 2 Tuff Tony def. Children of Pain - Electrified Lighttubes Death Match

==== Semi-finals ====
1. Tough Crazy Bastards def. Older & Younger - Fans Bring The Weapons Death Match
2. Mad Man Pondo & 2 Tuff Tony def. Dysfunction and Corporal Robinson - Fans Bring The Weapons Death Match

==== Final ====
1. Mad Man Pondo & 2 Tuff Tony def. The Tough Crazy Bastards - No Rope Barbed Wire, Cactus Caribbean Spider Webs Death Match

=== Double Death Tag Team Tournament 2007 ===
The second Double Death Tournament took place on October 26, 2007, at the Capital Sports Arena in Plainfield, Indiana.

Competitors

- Vulgar Display of Power (Brain Damage and Deranged)
- Naptown Dragons (Dustin Lee and Scotty Vortekz)
- Freakshow and Prophet
- The Bloody Brothers (Ian Rotten and Insane Lane)
- Mickie Knuckles and Storm
- Drake Younger and Corey Shaddix
- Devon Moore and Joker
- C.J. Otis & xOMGx

==== Quarter-finals ====
1. Vulgar Display of Power def. Freakshow and Prophet - Full Spool of Barbed Wire Death Match
2. The Bloody Brothers def. Mickie Knuckles & Storm - Barbed Wire Ropes & Barbed Wire Boards Death Match
3. Drake Younger & Corey Shaddix def. The Naptown Dragons - Barbed Wire Ropes & Deathmatch Bats Death Match
4. Devon Moore & Joker def. C.J. Otis & xOMGx - Barbed Wire Ropes, Tables, Ladders & Chairs Death Match

==== Semi-finals ====
1. The Bloody Brothers def. Joker & Devon Moore - Fans Bring The Weapons Death Match
2. Vulgar Display of Power def. Drake Younger & Corey Shaddix - Fans Bring The Weapons Death Match

==== Final ====
1. Vulgar Display of Power def. The Bloody Brothers - House of Horrors Cage Death Match

=== Double Death Tag Team Tournament 2008 ===
October 18 and 19, 2008 saw the third annual IWA Mid-South Double Death Tag Team Tournament, held at the Hartman Recreation Center in Joliet, Illinois.

Announced Competitors

- Cereal Killers (Mad Man Pondo & Juggulator)
- Joey Grunge & Mephisto
- The Bloody Brothers (Ian & Insane Lane Bloody)
- Stephen Saint & Donnie Peppercricket
- DUI (Devon Moore & Drake Younger)
- Murder Inc. (Rabid Bob 666 & Aaron Gunn)
- Beers & Tits (SeXXXy Eddy & Viking)
- Freakshow & Elkview Adam
- Grits-N-Gravy (Michael Elgin & Sami Callihan)
- Michigan Militia (Jeff Brooks & Kid Hybrid)
- Dysfunction & Danny Havoc
- Kody Rice & Chase McCoy
- Vulgar Display of Power (Brain Damage & Deranged)
- Tough Crazy Bastards (Necro Butcher & Toby Klein)
- Tracy Smothers & Corporal Robinson
- Chris Havius & Rob Tapp

==== Round one ====
1. Cereal Killers def. Joey Grunge & Mephisto - 4 Corners Of Pain Match
2. The Bloody Brothers def. Stephen Saint & Donnie Peppercricket - Fans Bring The Weapons Match
3. DUI def. Murder Inc. - Loose Light Tubes & Home Run Derby Death Match
4. Beers & Tits def. Freakshow & Elkview Adam in an Unlucky 13 Staple Gun / Stairway To Hell Match
5. Grits-N-Gravy def. Michigan Militia - barbedwire TLC Match
6. Tracy Smothers & Corporal Robinson def. Chris Havius & Rob Tapp - German Dog Collar Death Match
7. Dysfunction & Danny Havoc def. Kody Rice & Chase McCoy - Glass & Sandpaper Taipei Death Match
8. Vulgar Display of Power def. Tough Crazy Bastards - Fans Bring The Weapons Match

==== Quarter-finals ====
1. DUI def. Cereal Killers - Barbed Wire Corners & Light Tube Ropes Match
2. The Bloody Brothers def. Grits-N-Gravy - Barbed Wire Madness Match
3. Vulgar Display of Power def. Tracy Smothers & Corporal Robinson - Texas Death Match
4. Dysfunction & Danny Havoc def. Beer & Tits - Fans Bring The Weapons Match

==== Semi-finals ====
1. DUI def. The Bloody Brothers - 4 Corners Of Pain & Weapons Match
2. Vulgar Display of Power def. Dysfunction & Danny Havoc - Fans Bring The Weapons Match

==== Final ====
1. Vulgar Display of Power def. DUI - No Rope Barbed Wire, Caribbean Spiderweb & Light Tube & Barbed Wire Coffin Match

=== Double Death Tag Team Tournament 2021 ===
The fourth Double Death Tournament was held on April 3, 2021, at the Axl Rotten Memorial Hall in Connersville, Indiana.

Competitors

- Bloody Brothers 2.0 (Lane Bloody & JC Bloody)
- Young Dragons (Dale Patricks & Josh Crane)
- 44.OH 1(Rickey Shane Page & Bobby Beverly)
- 44.OH 2 (Eric Ryan & Atticus Cogar)
- Neil Diamond Cutter & Herzog
- John Wayne Murdoch & Satu Jinn
- The Hallowed (Otis Cogar & Lord Crewe)
- The Underdogs (Jack Griffin & Kevin Giza)

==== Non-Tournament Matches ====
1. Vincent Nothing def. Pompano Joe

==== Quarter-finals ====
1. The Underdogs def. 44.OH 1 - Barbed Wire Madness Match
2. 44.OH 2 def. The Hallowed - Fans Bring The Weapons Match
3. Young Dragons def. Neil Diamond Cutter & Herzog - Lightubes Ropes, Lightubes Bundles and 4 Corners of Pain Match
4. John Wayne Murdoch & Satu Jinn def. Bloody Brothers 2.0 - Taipei Death World Series of Glass Match

==== Semi-finals ====
1. John Wayne Murdoch & Satu Jinn def. The Underdogs - Up In Ya Death Match
2. 44.OH 2 def. Young Dragons - Lightube Door Derby Match

==== Final ====
1. 44.OH 2 def. John Wayne Murdoch & Satu Jinn - Caribbean Spider Web 200 Lightubes Death Match

=== Dutch Double Death Tag Team Tournament 2021 ===
The fifth Double Death Tournament will take place on November 7, 2021, at the Turner's Hall in Indianapolis, Indiana. It will be the first Double Death with mixed tag teams.

Competitors

- The Kirks (Brandon Kirk & Kasey Kirk)
- John Wayne Murdoch & Sage Sin
- Brad Cash & Sara Dox
- Eric Ryan & Gabby Gilbert
- Ludark Shaitan & Satu Jinn
- Insane Lane & Rebecca Payne
- Orin Veidt & Lilith Grimm
- JC Rotten & Amazing Maria

==== Quarter-finals ====
1. John Wayne Murdoch & Sage Sin def. Brad Cash & Sara Dox - No Rope Barbed Wire, Japanese Buckles Match
2. Insane Lane & Rebecca Payne def. Eric Ryan & Gabby Gilbert - No Rope Barbed Wire & Pallets Of Destruction Match
3. The Kirks (Brandon Kirk & Kasey Kirk) def. JC Rotten & Amazing Maria - No Rope Barbed Wire, Lightbulbs and Lighttubes Fence Match
4. Orin Veidt & Lilith Grimm def. Ludark Shaitan & Satu Jinn - No Rope Barbed Wire, Caribbean Spiderweb Match

==== Semi-finals ====
1. The Kirks (Brandon Kirk & Kasey Kirk) def. John Wayne Murdoch & Sage Sin - Death Match
2. Insane Lane & Rebecca Payne def. Lilith Grimm & Orin Veidt - Death Match

==== Final ====
1. The Kirks (Brandon Kirk & Kasey Kirk) def. Insane Lane & Rebecca Payne - Death Match

== IWA Mid-South Prince of the Deathmatch Tournament ==
=== Prince of the Death Matches 2010 ===
It was held Friday, April 23, 2010, at the Bellevue Plaza in Bellevue, Illinois. Competitors

- Jon Moxley
- Kyle "xOMGx" Threat
- Simon Sezz
- Neil Diamond Cutter
- Dixieland Destroyer
- Markus Crane
- Ron Mathis
- Brian Gott

==== Quarter-finals ====
1. Markus Crane def. Dixieland Destroyer - Barbwire Madness Match
2. Neil Diamond Cutter def. Jon Moxley - Curt Hennig Drunken Tai Pei Death Match
3. Ron Mathis def. Brian Gott - Barbwire Canvas Texas Bullrope Match
4. OMG def. Simon Sezz - Barefoot Thumbtacks and Light Tubes Match

==== Semi-finals ====
1. Neil Diamond Cutter def. Kyle Threat - Unlucky 13 Fish Hooks Match
2. Markus Crane def. Ron Mathis in a Caribbean Spider Web Death Match

==== Finals ====
1. Neil Diamond Cutter def. Markus Crane - Ultimate Hardcore X No Rope Barbed Wire Match

=== Prince of the Death Matches 2015 ===
It was held March 15, 2015 Competitors

- JC Rotten
- Kerry Awful
- American Viking
- Kathy Owens
- Dale Patricks
- Adam Bueller
- Mickey McFinnegan
- Nick Doepp

==== Quarter-finals ====
1. JC Rotten def. Kerry Awful - Barbed Wire Madness Match
2. The American Viking def. Kathy Owens - Barbed Wire Madness Match
3. Dale Patricks def. Adam Bueller - Barbed Wire Madness Match
4. Mikey McFinnegan def. Nick Doepp - Barbed Wire Madness Match

==== Semi-finals ====
1. Dale Patricks def. JC Rotten - Barbed Wire Madness Match
2. Mikey McFinnegan def. The American Viking - Fans Bring The Weapons Match

==== Finals ====
1. Dale Patricks def. Mikey McFinnegan - No Ropes Barbed Wire, Light Tube, Gussets Match

=== Prince of the Death Matches 2016 ===
Was held June 19, 2016 at the Pride Bar +Lounge in New Albany, Indiana. Competitors

- Amazing Maria
- Old Timer Jeff King
- JJ Garret
- Joseph Schwartz
- Aidan Blackhart
- Zodiak
- Deadly Dale
- Shad O' Satu

==== Quarter-finals ====
1. Jeff King def. Amazing Maria - Home, Lawn and Garden Death Match
2. Joseph Schwartz def. JJ Garrett - Thumbtack Madness and Carpet Strips
3. Zodiak def. Aidan Blackhart - Barbed Wire Boards And Bats Match
4. Deadly Dale def. Shad O' Satu - Tapei Four Corners Of Pain Match

==== Semi-finals ====
1. Deadly Dale def. Zodiak - Cinder Blocks & Gusset Plates Match
2. Joseph Schwartz def. Jeff King - Home Run Derby Match

==== Finals ====
1. Joseph Schwartz def. Deadly Dale - Fans Bring The Weapons Match

=== Prince of the Death Matches 2017 ===
Was held on for March 11, 2017 at the Memphis Flea Market in Memphis, Indiana. The winner of 2017 Prince of the Deathmatches gets entry into the 2017 King of the Deathmatches on May 20, 2017.

Competitors

- Mance Warner
- Amazing Maria
- Mitch Ryder
- Aidan Blackhart
- Nick Depp
- Derek Direction
- Eric Ryan
- Mad Mex

==== Round one ====
1. Thumbtack Madness Death Match: Nick Depp def. Amazing Maria
2. Log Cabins Of Glass Death Match: Derek Direction def. Aidan Blackheart
3. Barbed Wire Bats and Barbed Wire Boards Death Match: Mitch Ryder def. Mad Mex
4. Tai Pei Death and Pits Of Rubbing Alcohol Death Match: Mance Warner def. Eric Ryan

==== Round two ====
1. Home Run Derby Death Match: Nick Depp def. Derek Direction
2. 28 Years Of Bad Luck Match: Mance Warner def. Mitch Ryder

==== Round three ====
1. Fans Bring The Weapons Match: Nick Depp def. Mance Warner

=== Prince of the Death Matches 2018 ===
Was held on March 10, 2018, at the Memphis Flea Market in Memphis, Indiana. Field expanded to 12 Competitors.

Competitors

- Marko Stunt
- Kody Rice
- JC Rotten
- Eric Wayne
- Tripp Cassidy
- Cash Borden
- Orin Veidt
- Alister Wilde
- Gary Galaxy
- Justin Storm
- Mike Roach
- Amazing Maria

==== Quarter-finals ====
1. JC Rotten def. Cash Borden & Alister Wilde - Electrified Light Bulbs, Light Tubed & Light Tube Canvas 3 Way Match
2. Tripp Cassidy def. Kody Rice & Orin Verdt - Barbed Wire Boards & Bats 4 Corners of Pain 3 Way Match
3. Justin Storm def. Gary Galaxy & Mike Roach - Homerun Derby 3 Way Match
4. Amazing Maria def. Eric Wayne & Marko Stunt - Thumbtack Madness 3 Way Match

==== Semi-finals ====
1. Amazing Maria def. Justin Storm - Drunken Taipei Match:
2. JC Rotten def. Tripp Cassidy - Fans Bring the Weapons Match

==== Finals ====
1. Amazing Maria def. JC Rotten - World Series of Glass House of Pain Match

=== Prince of the Death Matches 2020 ===
Was held September 25, 2020 at the Axl Rotten Memorial Hall in Connersville, Indiana.

Competitors

- Lukas Jacobs
- Kevin Giza
- Atticus Cogar
- Logan James
- Mason Martin
- Dewey Wellington
- Cody McCulley
- Lincoln Moseley

Non Tournament:

1. Jake Crist (c) def. Rickey Shane Page - IWA Mid-South Heavyweight Championship
2. Alice Crowley & Becky Idol (c) def. 44.OH (Eric Ryan & Gregory Iron) - IWA Mid-South Tag Team Championship
3. Vincent Nothing def. Jimmy Jacobs - Singles Match

==== Quarterfinals ====
1. Mason Martin (w/ Erin) def. Cody McCulley - Gussets & Skewers Galore Match
2. Lukas Jacobs def. Logan James - Thumbtack Madness & Barbed Wire Boards Death Match
3. Dewey Wellington def. Lincoln Moseley - Hardcore Table, Ladders & Doors Match
4. Atticus Cogar def. Kevin Giza - 4 Corners of Pain & Tube Bundles Match

==== Semi-finals ====
1. Homerun Derby Match: Lukas Jacobs def. Dewey Wellington - Homerun Derby Match:
2. Atticus Cogar def. Mason Martin - Things You Don't Wanne Be Poked With Death Match

==== Final ====
1. Atticus Cogar def. Lukas Jacobs - Barbed Wire Cage Match

=== Prince of the Death Matches 2021 ===
Will be held July 31, 2021 at the Southside Turners in Indianapolis, Indiana.

Competitors

- Jack Griffin
- Dre Parker
- Jayce Karr
- Hunter Drake
- Remington Rhor
- Phoenix Kidd
- The Carver
- Lord Crewe

==== Quarter-finals ====
1. Jack Griffin def. Hunter Drake - Barefoot Toy Box Death Match:
2. Phoenix Kidd def. Lord Crewe - Tic Tac Death Match
3. Dre Parker def. Jayce Karr - Light Tube Ropes And Barbed Wire Boards Death Match
4. The Carver def. Remington Rhor - Fans Bring the Weapons Death Match

==== Semi-finals ====
1. The Carver def. Phoenix Kidd - Unlucky 13 Staple Gun Death Match
2. Jack Griffin def. Dre Parker -Homerun Derby Death Match

==== Final ====
1. The Carver def. Jack Griffin - Tubes & Panes Everywhere Death Match

== IWA Deep South Carnage Cup ==
=== King of the Deathmatch 2005 (Shut Down) ===
Happened Oct. 22, 2005 in Childersburg, Alabama, but was shut down by the police.

Competitors

- Insane Lane
- Johnny 8-Ball
- Mad Man Pondo
- Spider Boodrow
- Marty Shiftbower
- Iceberg
- Tank
- Freak Show
- Brandon Prophet
- Diehard Dustin Lee

=== Round one ===
- Brandon Prophet def. Diehard - Light Tube Board & Barbed Wire Ladder Match
- Spidar Boodrow vs. Marty Shiftbower - Barbed Wire Chairs and Pool Cues Match
- Tank def. The Freakshow - Barbed Wire Boards & Chair Match
- Iceberg def. Johnny 8-Ball - Barbed Wire Board & Ladder Match
- Mad Man Pondo def. Insane Lane - Forks and Pizza Cutter Match

The tournament was shut down after the fifth match. In his match, Diehard suffered a severe laceration resulting a spot with light tubes. He was rushed to the hospital where authorities were informed of the tournament's nature and then proceeded to shut it down.

=== King of the Deathmatch 2005 (Carnage Cup 2005) ===
Carnage Cup took place on December 3, 2005, at the Country Music Barn in Elkmont, Alabama.

Competitors

- Insane Lane
- Ian Rotten
- Mitch Page
- Necro Butcher
- Tank
- Freak Show
- Brandon Prophet
- Hellaware Assassin

==== Quarter-finals ====
- Necro Butcher def. Brandon Prophet - Light Tube Table and Barbed Wire Death Match
- Insane Lane def. Freak Show - Shopping Batt Match
- Ian Rotten def. Mitch Page - Unlucky 13 Staple Gun Match
- Tank def. Hellaware Assassin - Flaming Table Death Match

==== Semi-finals ====
- Necro Butcher def. Insane Lane - Fans Bring The Weapons Match
- Tank def.Ian Rotten - Fans Bring The Weapons Match

==== Finals ====
- Tank def. Necro Butcher - Barbed Wire Ropes and Ultraviolent Light Tubes Death Match

=== Carnage Cup 2006 ===
Carnage Cup Tournament took place on November 25, 2006, at the Highway 69 Sports Arena in Cullman, Alabama.

Competitors

- Necro Butcher
- Corporal Robinson
- Drake Younger
- Insane Lane
- Bull Pain
- Freak Show
- Ian Rotten
- Tank
- Dustin Lee
- Dysfunction
- Mickie Knuckles
- Mitch Page
- Ric Hayes

==== Quarter-finals ====
1. Insane Lane def. Ric Hayes - Razor Wire Boards Match
2. Necro Butcher def. Mitch Page - Unlucky 13 Light Tubes Match
3. Dysfunction def. Freak Show - Homewrecker Death Match
4. Ian Rotten def. Mickie Knuckles - Bare-Foot Thumbtacks, Thumbtack Bat, Staple Gun & Barbed Wire Corner Match
5. Drake Younger def. Dustin Lee - Ladders, Barbed Wire Tables, Barbed Wire Light Tube Table & Light Tube Bundles Match
6. Bull Pain def. Corporal Robinson - Light Tube Ropes & Light Tube Corners Match
7. Corporal Robinson & Freak Show def. Mitch Page, Mickie Knuckles, Dustin Lee & Ric Hayes - Second Chance Fans Bring The Weapons Battle Royal

==== Semi-finals ====
1. Drake Younger def. Ian Rotten - 2/3 Light Tube Log Cabins Match
2. Necro Butcher def. Freak Show - Taipei Death Match
3. Corporal Robinson def. Tank - Four Corners of Carnage Match
4. Insane Lane def. Bull Pain - Home Run Derby Death Match

==== Finals ====
1. Necro Butcher def. Corporal Robinson, Drake Younger & Insane Lane - 4-Way 200 Light Tubes Elimination Match

=== Carnage Cup 2007 ===
Carnage Cup Tournament took place on December 1, 2007, at the Nick Gulas Sports Arena in Pulaski, Tennessee.

Competitors

- Freak Show
- Danny Havoc
- Scotty Vortekz
- Insane Lane
- SeXXXy Eddy
- Deranged
- Viking
- Drake Younger
- Ian Rotten
- Tank
- UltraMantis Black
- WHACKS

==== Quarter-finals ====
1. Scotty Vortekz & SeXXXy Eddy def. UltraMantis Black - Light Tube Board, Light Tube Table, Barbed Wire Board & Barbed Wire Table Match
2. Danny Havoc & Deranged def. Tank - Unlucky 13 Light Tubes Match
3. Drake Younger & Viking def. WHACKS - Light Tube Corners & Light Tube Bundles Match
4. Freak Show & Insane Lane def. Ian Rotten - Home Run Derby Death Match

==== Semi-finals ====
1. Freak Show def. Deranged - Pits of Hell Match
2. Scotty Vortekz def. Viking - Light Tube Log Cabins Match
3. Danny Havoc def. Insane Lane - Razor Blade Boards Match

^{1.) SeXXXy Eddy got a bye because Drake Younger was unable to compete}

==== Finals ====
1. Freak Show def. Danny Havoc, SeXXXy Eddy & Scotty Vortekz - 4-Way 200 Light Tubes, Barbed Wire Tables Elimination Match

=== Carnage Cup 2008 ===
Carnage Cup Tournament took place on October 4, 2008, outside the Red Barn Bar in Elkmont, Alabama.

Competitors

- Freak Show
- Spider Boodrow
- Corey Shaddix
- Pinkie Sanchez
- Devon Moore
- Danny Havoc
- Juggulator
- Danny Demanto
- Nick Gage
- Insane Lane
- Sam Hane
- WHACKS
- Mike Levy
- Prophet
- Syko
- Hellaware Assassin

==== First round ====
1. Freak Show def. Hellaware Assassin - Barbed Wire Massacre
2. Prophet def. Mike Levy - Razor's Edge Death Match
3. Spider Boodrow def. Syko - Devil's Playground Death Match
4. Corey Shaddix def. Pinkie Sanchez - Home Run Derby Death Match
5. Insane Lane def. Sam Hane - Shopping Cart Death Match
6. Danny Havoc def. Juggulator - X Marks The Spot Death Match
7. Nick Gage def. Devon Moore - Fans Bring The Weapons Match
8. WHACKS def. Danny Demanto - Ladders & Light Tube Chairs Match

==== Semi-finals ====
1. Corey Shaddix def. Insane Lane - Hostel Death Match
2. Freakshow def. Spider Boodrow - Home & Garden Death Match
3. Nick Gage def. Prophet - Ultraviolent Boards Death Match
4. Danny Havoc def. WHACKS - Bundles of Joy Match

==== Finals ====
1. Danny Havoc def. Corey Shaddix, Nick Gage & Freakshow - 4-Way 200 Light Tubes Elimination Match

=== Carnage Cup V ===
Carnage Cup 2009 took place on September 26, 2009, at the National Guard Armory in Calera, Alabama.

Competitors

- Danny Havoc
- Christian Faith
- SeXXXy Eddy
- Insane Lane
- Freakshow
- Nick Gage
- Thumbtack Jack
- Scotty Vortekz
- Drake Younger

==== First round ====
1. SeXXXy Eddy def. Drake Younger in Barbed Wire and Carpet Strips House of Pain Death Match
2. Thumbtack Jack def. Scotty Vortekz - Exorcist Death Match
3. Danny Havoc def. Christian Faith - X Marks the Spot Death Match
4. Nick Gage def. Insane Lane & Freakshow - Home Run Derby Death Match

==== Semi-finals ====
1. SeXXXy Eddy def. Danny Havoc - Barefoot Thumbtacks Match
2. Thumbtack Jack def. Nick Gage - Ultraviolent Boards, Thumbtack Cinder Blocks Match

==== Finals ====
1. SeXXXy Eddy def. Thumbtack Jack - Double Hell, Fish Hooks, Light Tube Bundles & Light Tube Table Match

=== Carnage Cup 6 ===
It was held on Saturday April 10, 2010 at the Calera National Guard Armory in Calera, Alabama.

Participants

- David Day
- Viper
- Freakshow
- TJ Phillips
- Insane Lane
- Kody Krueger
- Jason Vayne
- Kornerstone

==== Round one ====
1. David Day def. Viper - Double Hell Barbed Wire Insanity Match
2. Freakshow def. TJ Phillips - Carpet Strips and Thumbtack Match
3. Kody Krueger def. Jason Vayne - Boards of Death Match
4. Insane Lane def. Kornerstone - Fans Bring the Weapons Match

==== Finals ====
1. Insane Lane def. David Day, Kody Krueger, and Freakshow - Unlimited Lighttubes Cage of Death Match

=== Carnage Cup 7 ===
It was held Saturday February 26, 2011 at the Cullman National Guard Armory in Cullman, Alabama. In non-tournament action Freakshow defeated Chrisjen Hayme to become the new IWA-DS Heavyweight Champion, and Kornerstone won a 6-man Death Match Rumble.

Participants

- Danny Havoc
- John Rare
- Viper
- Juicy Jimmie
- Neil Diamond Cutter
- Spider Boodrow
- Chris Dickinson
- "Bulldozer" Matt Tremont
- Johnny Manguel
- Devon Moore
- Pinkie Sanchez
- David Day
- Sloppy J

==== First round ====
1. Pinkie Sanchez def. Juicy Jimmie - Carpet Strips Match
2. Danny Havoc def. Matt Tremont - Smash, Pow, B@m! Death Match
3. Neil Diamond Cutter def. David Day - Pits of Hell, Lighttubes, and Ladders Match
4. Devon Moore def. Viper - Barbwire Mayhem Match
5. Chris Dickinson def. Johnny Manguel - Thumbtack Kick Pads Match
6. John Rare def. Spidar Boodrow - Saw Death Match

==== Second round ====
1. Pinkie Sanchez def. Chris Dickenson - Fans Bring The Weapons Match
2. Danny Havoc def. Devon Moore - Lighttube Boards, Doors, and Trashcan Match
3. Neil Diamond Cutter def. John Rare in an Exorcist Death Match

==== Finals ====
Pinkie Sanchez def. † Matt Tremont and Neil Diamond Cutter - Ladders, Scaffold, and Lighttubes Match

†"Bulldozer" Matt Tremont replaced Danny Havoc who sustained a laceration on his back and could not compete.

=== Carnage Cup 8 ===
Was held on Saturday, March 31, 2012, at 2:00 pm and Sunday, April 1, 2012, at 1:00 pm at Donna's Barn and Cafe in Elkmont, Alabama.

Participants

- Freakshow
- John Rare
- Spider Boodrow
- American Kickboxer II
- Damien Payne
- Neil Diamond Cutter
- Bryant Woods
- Sid Fabulous
- Bill The Butcher
- Matt Tremont
- Kody Krueger
- Devon Maximus
- Phil Macchio
- Josh Crowe
- Travis Locked
- Ron Mathis

==== First round ====
1. Spider Boodrow def. Bryant Woods - Spider Net Circus Death Match
2. Kody Krueger def. Bill the Butcher - No Ropes Barbed Wire Carpet Strip House Of Pain Match
3. John Rare def. Mad Man Pondo - Deep Sea Death Match
4. Freakshow def. Travis Locke - Smash, Bam, Pow & Crash Death Match
5. Damien Payne def. Josh Crowe - Loose Light Tubes Match
6. Ron Mathis def. Devon Maximus - Bundles Of Joy Death Match
7. Neil Diamond Cutter def. American Kickboxer II - Nathans Sadistic Playground Match
8. Matt Tremont def. Sid Fabulous - Barbed Wire Massacre Match

==== Second round ====
1. Matt Tremont def. Kody Krueger - Fans Bring The Weapons Match
2. Spider Boodrow def. John Rare - SAW II Death Match
3. Freakshow def. Neil Diamond Cutter - Barefoot Pits Of Hell Match
4. Damien Payne def. Ron Mathis - Death From Below Match

==== Finals ====
1. Spidar Boodrow def. Matt Tremont, Freakshow, and Damien Payne - Four Way No Ropes Flaming Barbed Wire 250 Light Tubes Death Match

=== Carnage Cup 9 ===
Was held on Saturday, November 16, 2013, at 8:00 pm and Sunday, November 17, 2013, at 1:00 pm at the SWF Arena in Tullahoma, Tennessee.

Participants

- Freakshow
- "Angel of Death" John Rare
- Spider Boodrow
- American Kickboxer II
- John Wayne Murdoch
- GANGER
- "The Suicidal Beast" Bryant Woods
- Sid Fabulous
- Yukon Jack
- "Bulldozer" Matt Tremont
- Tank
- Jay Impact
- Josh Crowe
- J.D. Horror
- "Relentless" Ron Mathis
- Kristian Kross

==== Non-Tournament (Night 2) ====
1. Big Donnie (c) def. Acid, Kornbread, and Terry Houston - DeathMatch Rumble for the $5 Wrestling Championship
2. Chrisjen Hayme def. Jeremy Flynt, Kayden Sade, Josh Crowe, LT Hawk vs Nick Traimer - Six Way Lucha Challenge Match
3. Spidar Boodrow vs John Rare was ruled a no contest when neither man could continue - SAW Death Match

==== First round ====
1. Sid Fabulous def. American Kickboxer 2* - House Of Glass Match
2. Bryant Woods def.. Jay Impact - Nail To The Head Match
3. Freakshow def. Yukon Jack - Fans Bring The Weapons Match
4. Ron Mathis def. GANGER - Carpet Strips Death Match
5. Matt Tremont def. Tank - Smash, Pow, Boom Match
6. J.D. Horror def. Spidar Boodrow - Dead Sea Circuit Net Death Match
7. Kristian Kross def.John Rare - Hostel Death Match
8. Josh Crowe def. John Wayne Murdoch due to referee stoppage - X Marks The Spot Match
- John Wayne Murdoch sustained a serious cut, which led to the Match being stopped. He required 15 stitches.
- Details are sketchy, but it seems American Kickboxer 2 lost a finger.

==== Second round ====
1. Bryant Woods def. Sid Fabulous - Nathan's Sadistic Playground Match
2. J.D. Horror def. Freakshow - Born To Be Wired Match
3. Matt Tremont def. GANGER [substitute for Kristian Kross] - Broken Glass, Thumbtacks & Lego Match
4. Ron Mathis received a bye into the finals when Josh Crowe swore off deathmatches and dropped out of the tournament.

==== Finals ====
1. "Bulldozer" Matt Tremont def. J.D. Horror, "Relentless" Ron Mathis, and Bryant Woods - No Ropes Barbed Wire, Bricks & Light Tubes Match

=== Carnage Cup 10 ===
Was held on February 28 through March 1, 2015 at the YBW Arena in Jasper, Tennessee.

Participants

- Colt 45
- "Angel of Death" John Rare
- Spider Boodrow
- Terry Houston
- Insane Lane
- Chuey Martinez
- "The Suicidal Beast" Bryant Woods
- Mosh Pit Mike
- Reuben Steel
- Freakshow
- El Nino Probelmo
- Tank
- Dale Patricks
- Corporal Robinson
- John Wayne Murdoch
- Josh Crane
- Belton Creedmore

==== First round ====
1. John Rare def. Colt 45 - Barefoot Pin Cushion Death Match
2. Spyder Boodrow def. Terry Houston - No Rope Barbed Wire Massacre Match
3. Bryant Woods def. Insane Lane - No Rope Barbed Wire Light Tubes Lit Candles Match
4. Chuey Martinez def. Mosh Pit Mike and Ruben Steel - Damn Yankee Three Way Death Match
5. Freakshow def. El Nino Problemo - Pat's Purgatory Death Match
6. Corporal Robinson def. Tank - Fans Bring The Lighttubes And Thumbtacks Match
7. John Wayne Murdoch def. Belton Creedmore - Exorcist Death Match
8. Josh Crane def. Dale Patricks - Lighttubes Corners Match

==== Second round ====
1. John Rare def. Chuey Martinez - Nathan's Sadistic Playground Match
2. Bryant Woods def. Corporal Robinson - Tennessee White Trash Death Match
3. Spydar Boodrow def. FreakShow - Concrete Jungle Match
4. Josh Crane def. John Wayne Murdoch - Bundles Of Joy Death Match

==== Finals ====
1. John Rare def. Bryant Woods and Josh Crane and Spydar Boodrow - No Rope Barbed Wire Razor Wire No Canvas Fire Cracker Board Sheet Rocks Four Way Match

=== Carnage Cup 11 ===
Was held on April 29, 2017, at the Sycamore Campground and Taco Shak in Iron City, Tennessee.

Participants

- Matt Tremont
- Josh Crane
- Dale Patricks
- G-Raver
- SHLAK
- Rob Marsh
- Jeff Cannonball
- Tank
- Colt 45
- Adam Beuller
- Bryant Woods
- Marcus Crane
- Freakshow
- Chuey Martinez
- Brad Cash
- Blaine Evans
- Kristian Kross
- Keylo Green
- Terry Houston
- Travis Dykes

==== Non-Tournament Match ====
1. Spider Boodrow vs. John Rare ended in a draw - 2 Out of 3 Falls SAW Death Match
- First Fall: John Rare def. Spider Boodrow
- Second Fall: John Rare vs. Spider Boodrow ended in a draw
- Third Fall: Spider Boodrow def. John Rare

==== First round ====
1. Josh Crane def. Matt Tremont - No Rope Barbed Wire Doors Of Death Match
2. Dale Patricks def. G-Raver - No Rope Fishing Wire Lake of Carnage Death Match
3. SHLAK def. Rob Marsh - No Rope Barbed Wire Gusset Plate Hell:
4. Chuey Martinez def. Blaine Evans, Brad Cash, Freakshow, Kristian Kross, Keylo Green, Terry Houston and Travis Dykes - No Rope Barbed Wire Fans Bring The Weapons and Lightubes Gauntlet Death Match
5. Jeff Cannonball def. Tank - No Rope Barbed Wire Gusset Plates, Taipei Death Match
6. Adam Bueller def. Colt 45 - No Rope Barbed Wire Barefoot Shit That Hurts Death Match
7. Bryant Woods def. Markus Crane - Emergency Room Death Match

==== Second round ====
1. Dale Patricks def. Bryant Woods, Chuey Martinez and Jimmy Lyon - 4 Way Landfill Death Match
2. Josh Crane def. Adam Bueller, Jeff Cannonball and SHLAK - 4 Way Arachnophobia Death Match

==== Finals ====
1. Josh Crane def. Dale Patricks - 500 Lighttubes Death Match

=== Carnage Cup 12 ===
Was held on October 9 and 10, 2021 at the VFW Fairgrounds in Carrollton, Georgia.

Participants

- JW Dalton
- Corey Bryant
- Remington Rhor
- Mike Roach
- Chet Rippley
- Lil Sicko
- Jay Blade
- Jamie Richards
- Hardcore Hillbilly
- Aidan Blackhart
- Chuey Martinez
- Mizfett
- Mosh Pit Mike
- Hoodfoot
- Blaine Evans
- John Rare

==== Non-Tournament Match (Night 2) ====
1. Spidar Boodrow Memorial Gauntlet Death Match: Hoodfoot defeated Aidan Blackhart and Jamie Richards and Juicy Bruce and Lil Sicko and Mike Roach and Raider Rock

==== First round ====
1. JW Dalton defeated Corey Bryant - Deep South Funhouse Death Match
2. Remington Rhor defeated Mike Roach - Homerun Derby Death Match
3. Chet Rippley defeated Lil Sicko - Daredevil Death Match
4. Jay Blade defeated Jamie Richards - Ladders & High Impact Razorblade Boards Death Match
5. Hardcore Hillbilly defeated Aidan Blackhart - Shopping Cart Death Match
6. Chuey Martinez defeated Mizfett - Bleeding Buckets Death Match
7. Mosh Pit Mike defeated Hoodfoot - Hostel Death Match
8. Blaine Evans defeated John Rare - Spiral Death Match

==== Second round ====
1. Remington Rhor defeated Chet Rippley - Tokyo Towers Glass City Death Match
2. Blaine Evans defeated Mosh Pit Mike - Desert Death Match
3. Chuey Martinez defeated Hardcore Hillbilly - Fans Bring The Weapons Death Match
- Jay Blade was given a bye to the finals after JW Dalton was unable to compete in the second round

==== Finals ====
1. Chuey Martinez defeated Blaine Evans and Jay Blade and Remington Rhor - Ultimate Carnage Elimination Death Match

=== Carnage Cup 13 ===
Was held on October 21, 2023 in McKenzie, Tennessee.

Participants

- Brian White
- Lil Sicko
- John Rare
- Hardcore Hillbilly
- Blaine Evans
- OBEY
- Chuey Martinez
- Sick Boy
- Jay Blade
- Bryant Woods
- MAGA Butcher
- Jimmy Controversy

==== First round ====
1. Brian White & Lil Sicko def. John Rare in a SAW Forever Death Match
2. Blaine Evans & OBEY def. Hardcore Hillbilly in a Spiral Death Match
3. Chuey Martinez & Sick Boy def. Jay Blade in a Death Match
4. Bryant Woods & MAGA Butcher def. Jimmy Controversy in a Deep South Funhouse Death Match

==== Second round ====
1. Lil Sicko def. OBEY in a Panes Of Glass & Board Of Carnage Death Match
2. Bryant Woods def. Blaine Evans in a Death Match
3. Chuey Martinez def. Brian White in a Fans Bring The Weapons Death Match
4. MAGA Butcher def. Sick Boy in a Six Corners Of Carnage Death Match

==== Finals ====
1. Bryant Woods def. Chuey Martinez, Lil Sicko, and MAGA Butcher in a House Of Glass Death Match for the vacant IWA Deep South Heavyweight Title

=== Carnage Cup 16 ===
Was held on 11-12 October in McKenzie, Tennessee

Participants

- Blaine Evans
- Kamikaze
- Kevin Kaos
- Mickey Vargas
- Luke Hateful
- GG Jacobs
- Jimmy Controversery
- Sid Fabulous
- Tristen Ramsey
- Sicko The Clown aka Lil Sicko
- Kato
- Skitzo
- Hardcore Hillbilly
- Relentess Rebel
- Nino Extremo
- Mickie Knuckles

== See also ==
- CZW Tournament of Death
