= Miracle Ultraviolence Connection =

Professional wrestling tag team

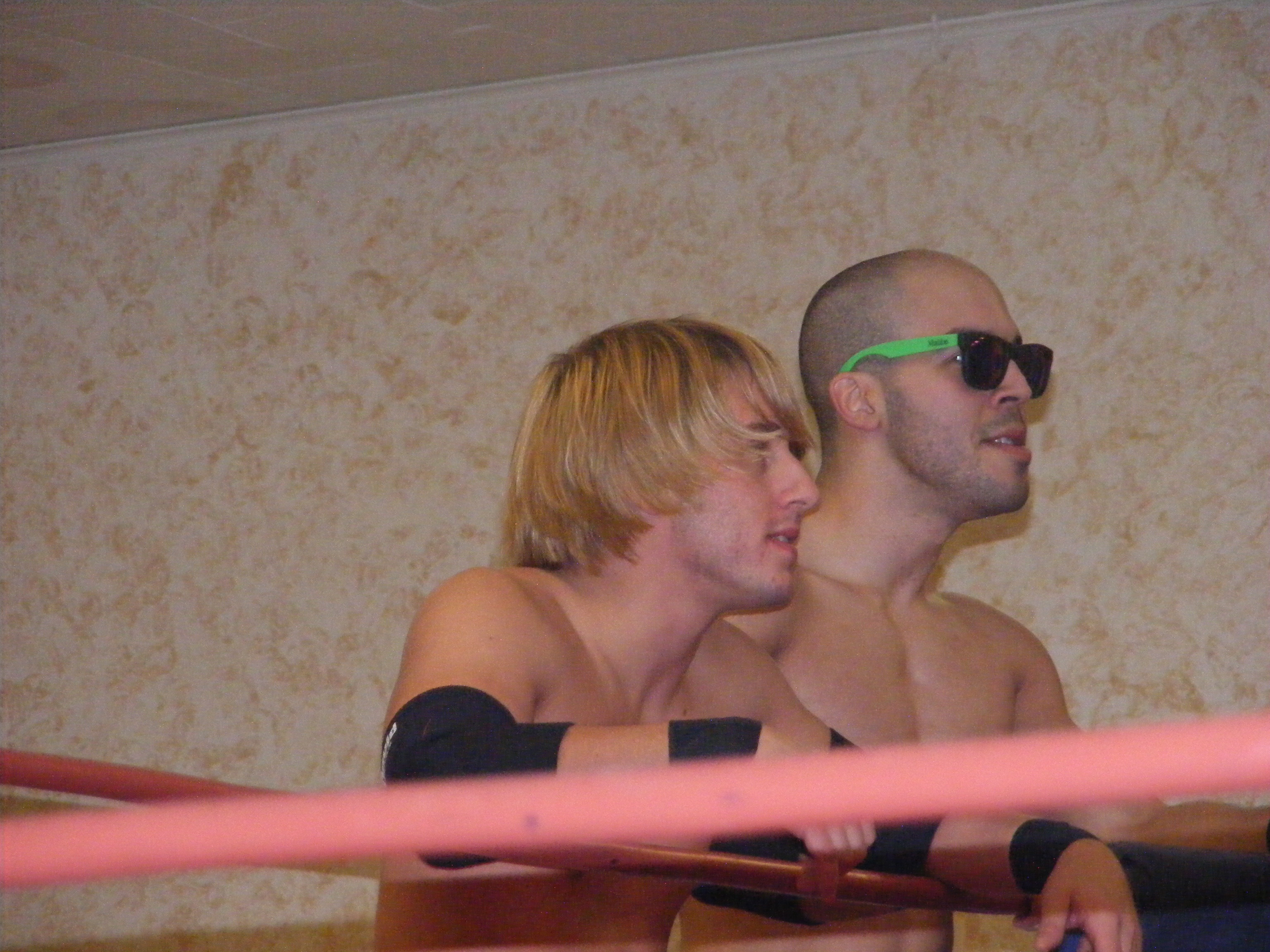
- Cloudy (left) and Cheech (right)

Stable
- Members: Cheech; Cloudy
- Name(s): Up In Smoke: (Cheech and Cloudy); Lacey's Angels: (Cheech and Cloudy); CloudLee: (Cloudy and Lee); Incoherencito (Cheech and Cloudy)
- Billed heights: Cheech: 6 ft 0 in (1.83 m); Cloudy: 5 ft 5 in (1.65 m); Brodie Lee: 6 ft 7 in (2.01 m)
- Combined billed weight: Cheech: 185 lb (84 kg; 13.2 st); Cloudy; 2320 Liquid Ounces; Brodie Lee: 280 lb (130 kg; 20 st)
- Billed from: Cheech: 6th Boro of New York; Down By The Beach; Cloudy: The Electric City, New York; Brodie Lee: Rochester, New York (CZW); Lincoln, Nebraska (Chikara)
- Former members: Brodie Lee
- Trained by: Cheech: Tony DeVito; Jeff Libolt; Cloudy: Tony DeVito; Oman Tortuga; Jim Tanner

The Miracle Ultraviolence Connection is an American professional wrestling tag team currently performing on the independent circuit. Consisting of Cheech and Cloudy, the team has performed under a number of different names and also functioned as a stable called The Miracle Ultraviolence Connection from 2007 to 2008 with Brodie Lee as a member. Up In Smoke has achieved championship success in a number of promotions, including Independent Wrestling Association Mid-South, and has also seen greater exposure upon performing in other independent promotions such as Chikara, Combat Zone Wrestling, Ring of Honor, and Evolve.

== Championships and accomplishments ==
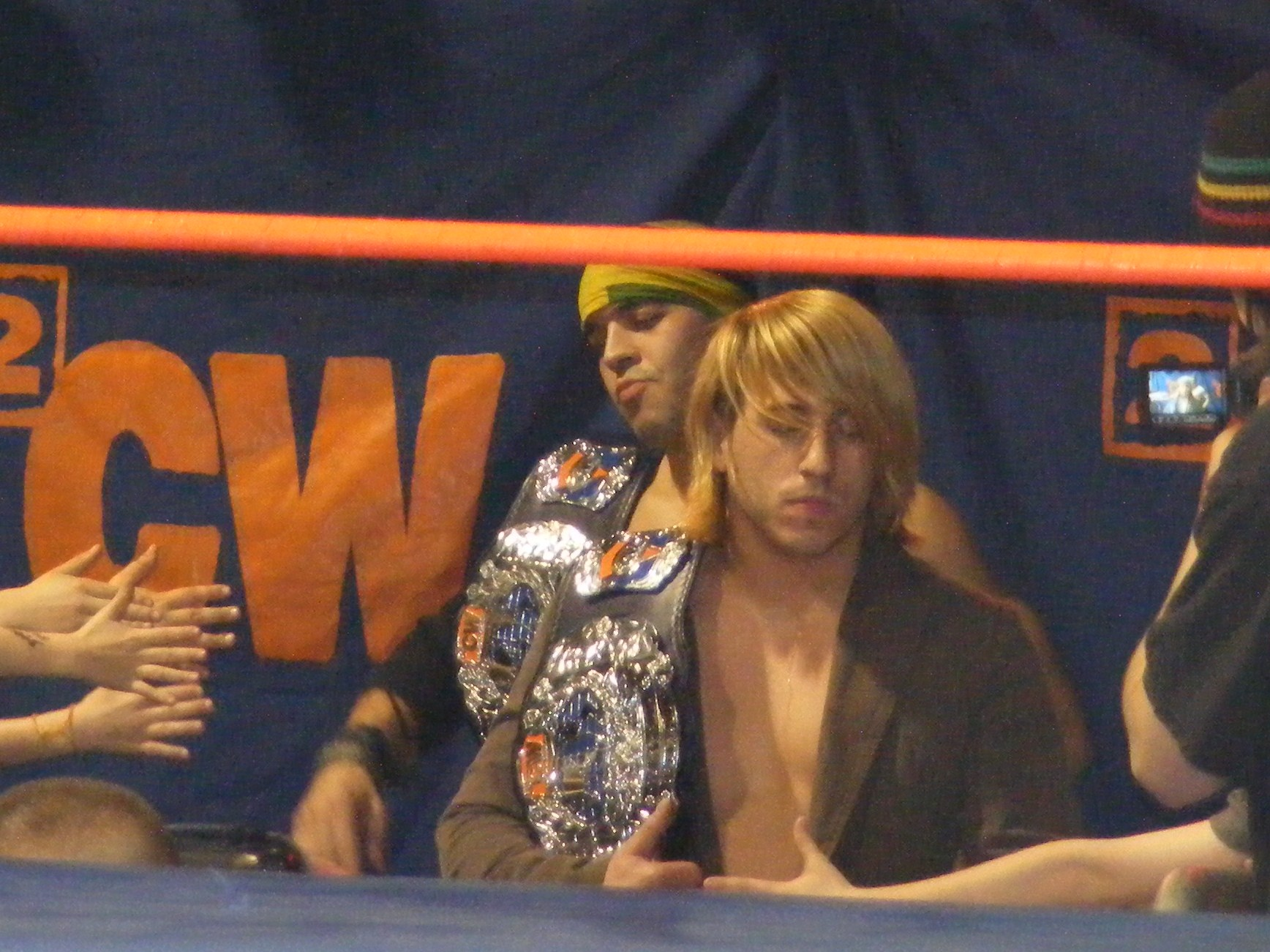
Cheech and Cloudy as the 2CW Tag Team Champions

- Absolute Intense Wrestling
  - AIW Tag Team Championship (1 times) – Cheech with Colin Delaney
- Alpha-1 Wrestling
  - Randy Poffo Invitational Tournament (2011) – Cheech
- Independent Wrestling Association Mid-South
  - IWA Mid-South Tag Team Championship (1 time) – Cheech and Cloudy
- International Wrestling Syndicate
  - IWS Tag Team Championship (1 time) – Cheech and Cloudy
- NWA Upstate/ Upstate Pro Wrestling
  - NWA Upstate Tag Team Championship (1 time) – Cheech and Cloudy
- Squared Circle Wrestling
  - 2CW Tag Team Championship (1 time) – Cheech and Cloudy
- UWA Hardcore Wrestling
  - UWA Tag Team Championship (1 time) – Cheech and Cloudy
- Upstate Pro Wrestling
  - UPW Tag Team Championship (1 time) – Cheech and Cloudy
