= Dale Patricks =

American male professional wrestler (born 1991)

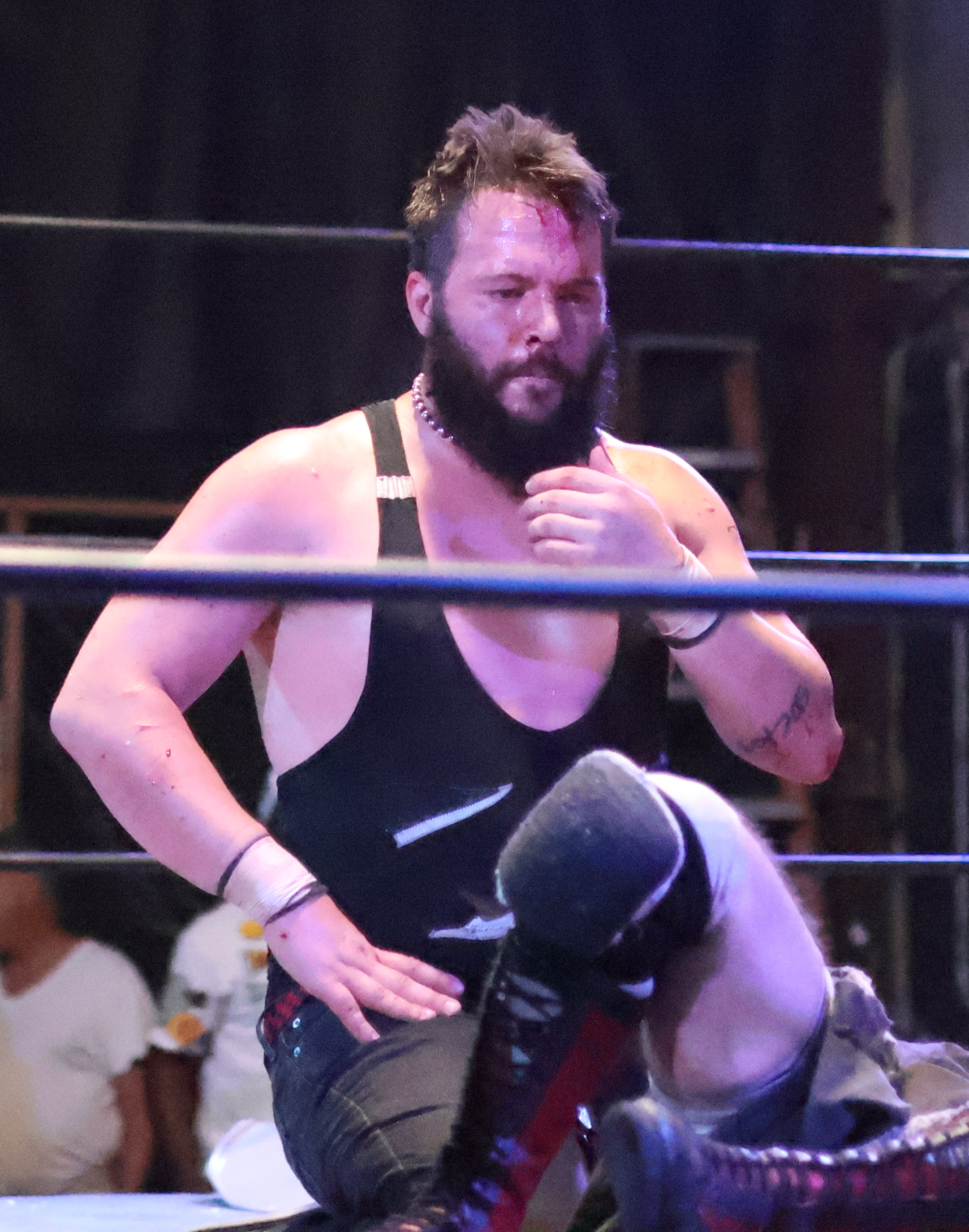
- Patricks in August 2024

Personal information
- Born: 14 September 1991 (age 35) Indianapolis, Indiana, United States

Professional wrestling career
- Ring name: Dale Patricks Lord of the Yard The Naked Ninja
- Billed height: 185 cm (6 ft 1 in)
- Billed weight: 109 kg (240 lb)
- Trained by: Billy Roc
- Debut: 2012

Michael Passmore better known by his ring name Dale Patricks is an American professional wrestler, He currently works on the independent circuit.

== Professional wrestling career ==
=== American independent circuit (2012–present) ===
Passmore made his professional wrestling debut at HWA Kick Off, an event promoted by Heartland Wrestling Association on January 7, 2012, where he fell short to Jerry Andrews in singles competition. He is known for his tenures with various promotions from the American independent scene such as ICW No Holds Barred (ICW NHB), Rockstar Pro Wrestling, Vicious Outcast Wrestling (VOW), WrestleARTS and many others, mainly competing in hardcore matches.

At GCW Dead On Arrival, an event promoted by Game Changer Wrestling on June 30, 2022, he unsuccessfully challenged Alex Colon for the GCW Ultraviolent Championship.

=== Combat Zone Wrestling (2012; 2016–2018) ===
Passmore competed in several of Combat Zone Wrestling's signature events. In the CZW Cage of Death, he made his first appearance at the eighteenth edition from December 10, 2016, where he teamed up with Devon Moore, Drew Bloodand Josh Crane to defeat Matt Tremont, Joey Janela, Jeff Cannonball and Conor Claxton. As for the Tournament of Death, he made his first appearance on the seventeenth edition from June 9, 2018, where he fell short to Josh Crane and Mance Warner in the first rounds.

=== IWA Mid-South (2013–2022) ===
Passmore shared a near decade-long tenure with IWA Mid-South, having wrestled in it until its closure in 2022. During his time with the promotion he won the IWA Mid-South Tag Team Championship on two different occasions. First, at IWA Mid-South Taking It To The Extreme on July 27, 2017, by teaming up with Josh Crane as "The Young Dragons" and defeating The Rejects (John Wayne Murdoch and Reed Bentley), and secondly at IWA Mid-South Tag, You're It! on June 24, 2021, by teaming up with "Team Lotttttttaaaaa Respect" stablemate Kevin Giza, defeating Born To Die (Corey Storm and Jake Crist). Patricks and Giza remained champions until the closure of IWA in June 2022.

He competed in several of the promotion's signature events. In the IWA Mid-South King of the Deathmatch, he made his first appearance at the 2015 edition. He scored his best result in 2017, where he made it to the semifinals in which he fell short to John Wayne Murdoch.

=== Big Japan Pro Wrestling (2024–present) ===
Passmore made his debut in Big Japan Pro Wrestling at a house show from April 10, 2024, where he teamed up with Hardway Heeter to defeat Kankuro Hoshino and Kazumi Kikuta in tag team competition. During his time with the promotion, he chased for various titles. He first won the BJW Tag Team Championship by teaming up with Mad Man Pondo as "Baka Gaijin" on October 29, 2024, at BJW and defeating Masaya Takahashi and Sagat. At BJW on March 6, 2025, he teamed up with Akira and Mad Man Pondo to unsuccessfully challenge Abdullah Kobayashi, Kankuro Hoshino and Ryuji Ito. for the Yokohama Shopping Street 6-Man Tag Team Championship. At BJW 30th Anniversary ~ Dainichi Spirit on May 5, 2025, he unsuccessfully challenged Akira for the BJW Deathmatch Heavyweight Championship.

Passmore competed in one of the promotion's signature events, the Ikkitousen Deathmatch Survivor tournament in which he made his first appearance ath the 2024 edition where he placed himself in the B block, scoring a total of six points after competing against Daiju Wakamatsu, Yuki Ishikawa, Beastman and Ryuji Ito, failing to qualify to the finals.

== Championships and accomplishments ==
- Asylum Wrestling Revolution
  - AWR Heavyweight Championship (1 time)
  - AWR Tag Team Championship (1 time) – with Josh Crane
  - Asylum Deathmatch Tournament (2019)
- WrestleArts
  - WrestleArts Global Tag Team Championship (1 time) – with Ace Perry
- Big Japan Pro Wrestling
  - BJW Tag Team Championship (2 times) – with Mad Man Pondo
- Hybrid Championship Wrestling
  - HCW Midwest Championship (1 time)
- IWA Mid-South
  - IWA Mid-South Tag Team Championship (2 times, final) – with Josh Crane (1) and Kevin Giza (1)
  - Prince of the Death Matches (2015)
- Ruthless Pro Wrestling
  - RPW Rust Belt Championship (1 time)
- Unsanctioned Pro
  - Unsanctioned Pro Hardcore Championship (1 time)
- Vicious Outcast Wrestling
  - VOW Anarchy Championship (1 time)
  - Lord of Anarchy 4 (2018)
- WrestleRave
  - Death Triad Tournament (2022)
- Wild Championship Wrestling Outlaws
  - WCWO Outlaw Heavyweight Championship (1 time)
  - WCWO Fight or Die Championship (1 time)
  - WCWO Tag Team Championship (2 time) – with Calvin Tankman and Josh Crane
- Other Accomplishments
  - Dynamite Cup (2017)
