= IWA Mid-South Tag Team Championship =

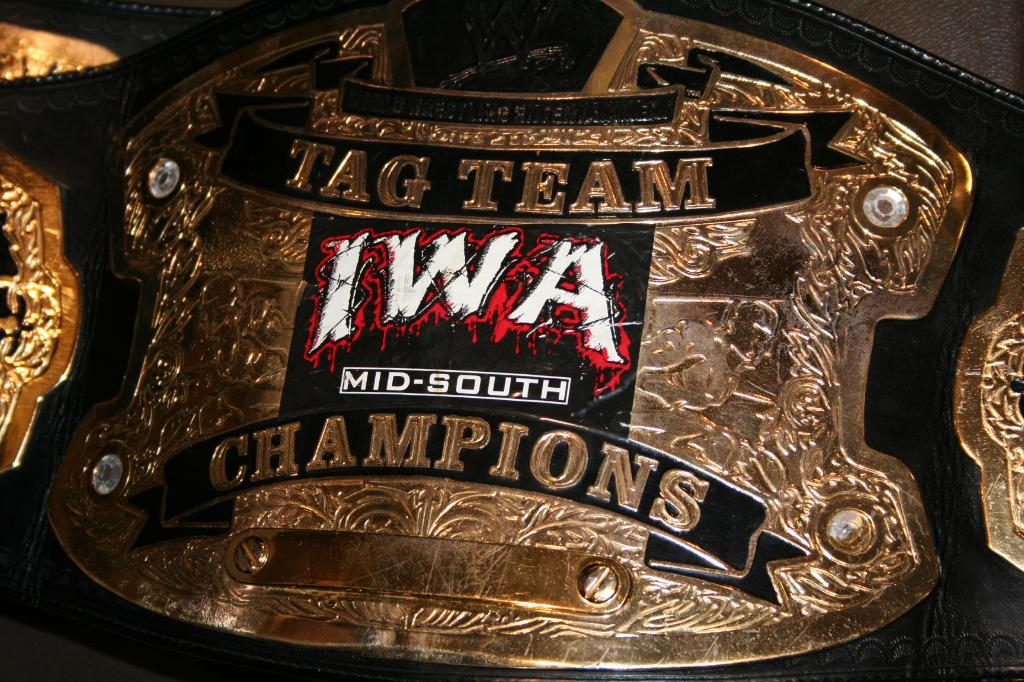

Details
- Promotion: IWA Mid-South
- Date established: July 18, 1997
- Current champions: Dale Patricks and Kevin Giza
- Date won: June 24, 2021
Statistics
- First champions: The War Machines (War Machine #1 and War Machine #2)
- Most reigns: As a tag team: The Iron Saints (3 times); As a stable:The Player's Club (4 reigns); As individual:Vito Thomaselli, Sal Thomaselli, Rollin' Hard and Mitch page (3 reigns)
- Longest reign: The Players Club (Logan James and Tyler Matrix) (484 days)
- Shortest reign: Southern Comfort (Tracy Smothers and Chris Hamrick) (1 day)
- Heaviest champion: Mitch Page (363 lb)

The IWA Mid-South Tag Team Championship is a tag team title in the IWA Mid-South promotion. The title debuted in 1997, but was abandoned before the year was out, and had a brief revival in 2002. The title was brought back from 2004 to 2008 and then once again from 2017 to the present. When it was reactivated in 2017, it was done via the Candido Cup, an eight-team tournament held on April 27, 2017. There have been a total of 44 reigns shared between 35 different teams consisting of 67 distinctive champions and five vacancies. The current champions are Dale Patricks and Kevin Giza, who are in their first reign as a team.

== Inaugural tournament ==
On July 18, 1997, at the Gore Fest 1997 show in Louisville, Kentucky, an eight-team elimination tag team tournament was held to crown the first IWA Mid-South Tag Team Champions.

Quarterfinals
Tom Burton and Tower of Doom
Shark Boy and American Kickboxer
The War Machines (War Machine #1 and War Machine #2)
Twiggy Ramirez and Lost Boy
Bull Pain and Tarek The Great
Rollin' Hard and Brian Taylor
Ian Rotten and Blaze
The Misfits

Semifinals
Tom Burton and Tower of Doom
The War Machines
Bull Pain and Tarek The Great
Ian Rotten and Blaze

Finals
The War Machines
Bull Pain and Tarek The Great

== Title history ==
Key
No.	Overall reign number
Reign	Reign number for the specific team—reign numbers for the individuals are in parentheses, if different
Days	Number of days held
<1	Reign lasted less than a day
+	Current reign is changing daily

No.	Champion	Championship change			Reign statistics		Notes	Ref.
No.	Champion	Date	Event	Location	Reign	Days	Notes	Ref.
1	The War Machines (War Machine #1 and War Machine #2)	July 18, 1997	IWA Mid-South Gore Fest 1997	Louisville, Kentucky	1	48	Defeated Bull Pain and Terek the Great in a tournament final to become the inaugural champions.	
2	The Misfits (Derek Domino and Harley Lewis)	September 4, 1997	IWA Mid-South When Two Sides Go To War	Louisville, Kentucky	1	0 - 118	The length of this reign is uncertain.	
—	Vacated	1997	-	-	—	—	The titles were abandoned somewhere between September and December under unknown circumstances.	
3	Mean And Hard (Rollin' Hard and Mitch Page)	February 1, 2002	IWA Mid-South 28 Days	Charlestown, Indiana	1	29	Defeat Todd Morton and Mitch Ryder in tournament final after the titles were reinstated.	
4	The Bad Breed (Axl Rotten and Ian Rotten)	March 2, 2002	IWA Mid-South Morris Mayhem	Morris, Illinois	1	34	This was a three-way match also involving Cash Flo and Corporal Robinson.	
5	Mean And Hard (Rollin' Hard and Mitch Page)	April 5, 2002	IWA Mid-South April Bloodshowers 2002	Indianapolis, Indiana	2	28	Necro Butcher replaced Axl Rotten in the title defense due to Rotten getting injured.	
6	Cash Flo and Ian Rotten (2)	May 3, 2002	IWA Mid-South Locked	Indianapolis, Indiana	1	7		
7	Tarek The Great and Ian Rotten (3)	May 10, 2002	House show	Clarksville, Indiana	1	8	Cash Flo turned on Ian Rotten after they won the titles in the previous reign. One week later, Rotten defeated Flo to gain the control of both belts, but IWA refused to recognize him as sole champion so he chose Tarek The Great as his tag team partner.	
8	Mean And Hard (Rollin' Hard and Mitch Page)	May 18, 2002	House show	Clarksville, Indiana	3	77		
9	Harry Palmer and Mark Wolf	August 3, 2002	IWA Mid-South Wrestling In Hades Weekend	Clarksville, Indiana	1	0 - 28	The length of this reign is uncertain	
—	Vacated	August 2002	—	—	—	—	The titles were abandoned somewhere in August under unknown circumstances.	
10	Southern Comfort (Tracy Smothers and Chris Hamrick)	May 29, 2004	IWA Mid-South A Shot Of Southern Comfort	Highland, Indiana	1	1	Defeated The Second City Saints (CM Punk and Colt Cabana) in a tournament final to win the reactivated titles.	
11	The Monsters (Brad Bradley and Ryan Boz)	May 30, 2004	IWA Mid-South Volcano Girls	Hammond, Indiana	1	111		
12	The Wild Cards (Eddie Kingston and Blackjack Marciano)	September 18, 2004	IWA Mid-South Ted Petty Invitational 2004	Highland, Indiana	1	119	This was a three-way match also involving Tank and Iceberg.	
13	Brad Bradley (2), Ryan Boz (2) and Trik Davis	January 15, 2005	IWA Mid-South Anything Goes 2K5	Highland, Indiana	1	147	This was a Steel cage match. Steve Stone replaced Black Jack Marciano due to his injury. Bradley also git injured during the match and Trik Davis substituted him. However, Bradley is also recognized as champion under the freebird rule even if pulled out of the match.	
14	The Iron Saints (Vito Thomaselli and Sal Thomaselli)	June 11, 2005	IWA Mid-South Something To Prove	Philadelphia, Pennsylvania	1	28	This was a six-way tag team elimination match.	
15	The Bad Breed (Axl Rotten and Ian Rotten (4))	July 9, 2005	House show	Hammond, Indiana	2	56		
—	Vacated	September 3, 2005	House show	—	—	—	Titles were vacated after Ian Rotten suffered a concussion.	
16	The Iron Saints (Vito Thomaselli and Sal Thomaselli)	September 10, 2005	IWA Mid-South The Champ Is Here	Plymouth, Indiana	2	189	Defeated Matt Sydal and Delirious in a tournament final to win the vacant titles.	
17	Ian Rotten (5) and Mad Man Pondo	March 18, 2006	IWA Mid-South March Massacre	Midlothian, Illinois	1	146	This was a no ropes barbed Taipei death match.	
18	Vulgar Display of Power (Deranged and Brain Damage)	August 11, 2006	IWA Mid-South Simply The Best 7	Midlothian, Illinois	1	44	Drake Younger replaced an injured Mad Man Pondo in the match.	
—	Vacated	September 25, 2006	—	—	—	—		
19	The Iron Saints (Vito Thomaselli and Sal Thomaselli)	May 26, 2007	IWA Mid-South Candido Cup 2007	Midlothian, Illinois	3	280	Defeated Up in Smoke (Cheech and Cloudy) in the Candido Cup tournament final to win the vacant titles.	
20	The BLKOUT (Joker and Ricky Reyes)	March 1, 2008	IWA Mid-South 500th Show	Joliet, Illinois	1	42	Joker and Ricky Reyes won the titles, but any member of The BLKOUT stable was allowed to take place in title defenses by the freebird rule. Even if other members of the stable such as Ruckus, Sabian and Too Cold Scorpio defended the titles, they were not recognized as champions.	
21	Josh Abercrombie, Mickie Knuckles and Devon Moore	April 12, 2008	IWA Mid-South April Bloodshowers 2008	Joliet, Illinois	1	21	Ruckus, Sabian and Too Cold Scorpio defended the titles instead of Joker and Ricky Reyes. Knuckles became the first woman to hold the titles.	
22	Up in Smoke (Cheech and Cloudy)	May 3, 2008	IWA Mid-South A Night Of Champions	Joliet, Illinois	1	N/A	The length of this reign is uncertain. Mickie Knuckles and Devin Moore defended the titles.	
—	Vacated	2008	—	—	—	—	The titles were vacated somewhere in 2008 due to IWA Mid-South ceasing its operations at that time starting a planned hiatus.	
23	Hot Chocolate (Sugar Dunkerton and Myron Reed)	April 27, 2017	IWA Mid-South Candido Cup 2017	Jeffersonville, Indiana	1	49	Defeated The Ugly Ducklings (Lance Lude & Rob Killjoy) in the Candido Cup final to win the vacant titles.	
24	The 4Gotten (Aidan Blackhart and Justin Storm)	June 15, 2017	IWA Mid-South Anything You Can Do, I Can Do Better	Jeffersonville, Indiana	1	22		
25	The Rejects (John Wayne Murdoch and Reed Bentley)	July 7, 2017	IWA Mid-South In Memory Of Madison	Jeffersonville, Indiana	1	20		
26	The Young Dragons (Dale Patricks and Josh Crane)	July 27, 2017	IWA Mid-South Taking It To The Extreme	Jeffersonville, Indiana	1	42	This was a Three Way Tables, Ladders, and Chairs match also involving Brandon Taggart and Larry D.	
27	Mance Warner and Zodiak	September 7, 2017	IWA Mid-South Prelude To Petty 2017	Memphis, Indiana	1	56		
28	Outlaw Inc. (Eddie Kingston (2) and Homicide)	November 2, 2017	IWA Mid-South November Pain 2017	Memphis, Indiana	1	78	Calvin Tankman would go out to defend the titles when any of Kingston or Homicide were not able to do. He defended the titles unsuccessfully against Elliott Paul and Pat Monix with the reason behind it being still unknown. His only known successful defense was at IWA Mid-South: Simply the Best 11 on December 14, 2017, where he teamed up with Homicide to defeat Jake Parnell and Shane Mercer.	
29	Unfortunate Pairing (Elliott Paul and Pat Monix)	January 19, 2018	IWA Mid-South A Hard Day's Night	Memphis, Indiana	1	48	Defeated Calvin Tankman in a 2-on-1 handicap match. How Tankman reached to defend Kingston's and Homicide's titles alone is unknown nor if he was recognized champion.	
30	FireArms (Myron Reed (2) and Trey Miguel)	March 8, 2018	IWA Mid-South No Retreat, No Surrender 2018	Memphis, Indiana	1	43		
31	The Gym Nasty Boyz (Timmy Lou Retton and White Mike)	April 20, 2018	IWA Mid-South Candido Cup 2018	Memphis, Indiana	1	111	This was the Candido Cup final.	
32	The Murphy Boyz (Cameron Murphy and Carson Murphy)	August 9, 2018	IWA Mid-South Bringing Nasty Back	Memphis, Indiana	1	44		
33	The Top Guys (Adam Slade and Kevin Giza)	September 22, 2018	IWA Mid-South Ted Petty Invitational 2018	Indianapolis, Indiana	1	47	This was a four-way match also involving Jimmy Jacobs & Joe Alonzo and Logan James & Myron Reed.	
34	Dakota Bostock and Shane Mercer	November 8, 2018	IWA Mid-South The Player's Ball	Jeffersonville, Indiana	1	14		
35	The Player's Club (Adam Slade (2), Kevin Giza (2), Billy The P and Lukas Jacobs)	November 22, 2018	IWA Mid-South Wrestlefeast 2018	Jeffersonville, Indiana	1^{(2)}	49	This was an elimination tag team match. Slade, Jacobs and Billy The P won the titles, but Giza is also recognized as champion under the freebird rule. Bostock defended the titles teaming up with Larry D and JC Rotten who replaced Shane Mercer. However, Larry D and Rotten were not recognized as champions even if officially taking part in the title defense match.	
36	Mama's Boiz (Joe Travis and Joshie Boy)	January 10, 2019	IWA Mid-South Out With The Old In With The New 2019	Jeffersonville, Indiana	1	42		
37	The PD Express/The Player's Club (Logan James and Tyler Matrix/and Adam Slade (3))	February 21, 2019	IWA Mid-South Heartbreak After Heartbreak	Jeffersonville, Indiana	1^{(3,4)}	484	Logan James and Tyler Matrix later joined The Player's Club stable. Adam Slade was allowed to defend the titles several times, with documentations stating that he was recognized as a champion under the freebird rule starting by the IWA Mid-South Summertime Blues Baby event which took place on June 13th. However, James and Matrix started being recognized again as a two-person tag team beginning with the IWA Mid-South Seasons Beatings 2019 event which took place on December 12th, documentations stating that Adam Slade was no longer part of the reign. James and Matrix's reign have been recognized as uninterrupted.	
38	Alice Crowley and Becky Idol	June 19, 2020	IWA Mid-South Unfinished Business	Indianapolis, Indiana	1	141	This was a six-way tables, ladders and chairs match also involving Hunter Drake & Tyler Franks, Ace Perry & Dale Patricks, Chris Dickinson & KTB and Kevin Giza & Lukas Jacobs. Crowley and Idol are the first women wrestlers to win the title.	
39	GK Fam (Prima Donny and Piper)	November 7, 2020	IWA Mid-South Somebody's Gonna Hurt Somebody 2020	Jeffersonville, Indiana	1	19	This was a four-way tag team match also involving Mama's Boiz (Joe Travis and Joshie Boy) and The Difference (Jordan Whittaker and Ray Waddell).	
40	Mama's Boiz (Joe Travis and Joshie Boy)	November 26, 2020	IWA Mid-South Wrestlefeast 2020	Jeffersonville, Indiana	2	37	This was an Old school match.	
41	The Mason Dixon Line (Devan Dixon and Silas Mason)	January 2, 2021	Out With The Old, In With The New 2021	Jeffersonville, Indiana	1	40		
42	The PD Express (Logan James and Tyler Matrix)	February 11, 2021	Heartbreak	Jeffersonville, Indiana	2^{(5)}	63	This was a gauntlet tag team match also involving GK Fam (Piper and Prima Donny), Talladega Flights (Hunter Drake and Tyler Franks), The Highlight Reel (Damian Reel and Diamon Reel) and The Lost (Brayden Toon and Shean Christopher).	
43	Jake Crist and John Wayne Murdoch (2)	April 15, 2021	Spring Fever 2021	Jeffersonville, Indiana	1	49		
44	Born To Die (Corey Storm and Jake Crist (2))	June 3, 2021	IWA Mid-South You Ain't Seen Crazy Yet	Jeffersonville, Indiana	1	21	This was a "Winner Takes All" match between Christ and Murdoch in which Corey Storm was awarded Murdoch's half of the championship.	
45	Team Lotttttttaaaaa Respect (Dale Patricks (2) and Kevin Giza (3))	June 24, 2021	IWA Mid-South Tag, You're It!	Jeffersonville, Indiana	1	355		
—	Deactivated	June 14, 2022	—	—	—	—	The promotion ceased operations	

== Combined reigns ==
As of March 16, 2026.

†	Indicates the current champion
¤	The exact length of at least one title reign is uncertain.

=== By team ===
Rank	Team	No. of reigns	Combined days
1	The Top Guys/The PD Express/The Player's Club (1st reign: Adam Slade and Kevin Giza; 2nd reign: Adam Slade, Kevin Giza, Billy The P and Lukas Jacobs; 3rd reign: Logan James, Tyler Matrix and Adam Slade; 4th-5th reign: Logan James and Tyler Matrix)	4^{(5)}	643
2	The Iron Saints (Vito Thomaselli and Sal Thomaselli)	3	496
3	Team Lotttttttaaaaa Respect (Dale Patricks and Kevin Giza)	1	355
4	Brad Bradley, Ryan Boz and Trik Davis	1	148
5	Ian Rotten and Mad Man Pondo	1	147
6	Alice Crowley and Becky Idol	1	141
7	Mean And Hard (Rollin' Hard and Mitch Page)	3	134
8	The Wild Cards (Eddie Kingston and Blackjack Marciano)	1	119
9	The Misfits (Derek Domino and Harley Lewis)	1	¤0-118
10	The Monsters (Brad Bradley and Ryan Boz)	1	111
10	The Gym Nasty Boyz (Timmy Lou Retton and White Mike)	1	111
12	The Bad Breed (Axl Rotten and Ian Rotten)	2	90
13	Mama's Boiz (Joe Travis and Joshie Boy)	2	79
14	Outlaw Inc. (Eddie Kingston and Homicide)	1	78
15	Mance Warner and Zodiak	1	56
16	Hot Chocolate (Sugar Dunkerton and Myron Reed)	1	49
16	Jake Crist and John Wayne Murdoch	1	49
18	The War Machines (War Machine #1 and War Machine #2)	1	48
18	Unfortunate Pairing (Elliott Paul and Pat Monix)	1	48
20	The Murphy Boyz (Cameron Murphy and Carson Murphy)	1	44
20	Vulgar Display of Power (Deranged and Brain Damage)	1	44
22	FireArms (Myron Reed and Trey Miguel)	1	43
23	The BLKOUT (Joker and Ricky Reyes)	1	42
23	The Young Dragons (Dale Patricks and Josh Crane)	1	42
25	The Mason Dixon Line; Devan Dixon and Silas Mason)	1	40
26	Harry Palmer and Mark Wolf	1	¤0-28
27	Corey Storm and Jake Crist	1	21
27	Josh Abercrombie, Mickie Knuckles and Devon Moore	1	21
29	The Rejects (John Wayne Murdoch and Reed Bentley)	1	20
30	GK Fam (Prima Donny and Piper)	1	19
31	Dakota Bostock and Shane Mercer	1	14
32	The 4Gotten (Aidan Blackhart and Justin Storm)	1	12
33	Tarek The Great and Ian Rotten	1	8
34	Cash Flo and Ian Rotten	1	7
35	Southern Comfort (Tracy Smothers and Chris Hamrick)	1	1
36	Up in Smoke (Cheech and Cloudy)	1	¤N/A

=== By wrestler ===
Rank	Wrestler	No. of reigns	Combined days
1	Logan James	2	547
1	Tyler Matrix	2	547
3	Vito Thomaselli	3	496
3	Sal Thomaselli	3	496
5	Kevin Giza	3	355
6	Dale Patricks	2	355
7	Adam Slade	3	278
8	Brad Bradley	2	259
8	Ryan Boz	2	259
10	Ian Rotten	5	252
11	Eddie Kingston	2	197
12	Trik Davis	1	148
13	Mad Man Pondo	1	147
14	Alice Crowley	1	141
14	Becky Idol	1	141
16	Mitch Page	3	134
16	Rollin' Hard	3	134
18	Blackjack Marciano	1	119
19	Derek Domino	1	¤0-118
19	Harley Lewis	1	¤0-118
21	Timmy Lou Retton	1	111
21	White Mike	1	111
23	Myron Reed	2	92
24	Axl Rotten	2	90
25	Joe Travis	2	79
25	Joshie Boy	2	79
27	Homicide	1	78
28	Jake Crist	1	70
29	John Wayne Murdoch	2	68
30	Mance Warner	1	56
30	Zodiak	1	56
32	Billy The P	1	49
32	Lukas Jacobs	1	49
32	Sugar Dunkerton	1	49
35	Elliott Paul	1	48
35	Pat Monix	1	48
35	War Machine #1	1	48
35	War Machine #2	1	48
39	Brain Damage	1	44
39	Cameron Murphy	1	44
39	Carson Murphy	1	44
39	Deranged	1	44
43	Trey Miguel	1	43
44	Joker	1	42
44	Josh Crane	1	42
44	Ricky Reyes	1	42
47	Devan Dixon	1	40
47	Silas Mason	1	40
49	Harry Palmer	1	¤0-28
49	Mark Wolf	1	¤0-28
51	Corey Storm	1	21
51	Devon Moore	1	21
51	Josh Abercrombie	1	21
51	Mickie Knuckles	1	21
55	Reed Bentley	1	20
56	Prima Donny	1	19
56	Piper	1	19
58	Dakota Bostock	1	14
58	Shane Mercer	1	14
60	Aidan Blackhart	1	12
60	Justin Storm	1	12
62	Tarek The Great	1	8
63	Cash Flo	1	7
64	Chris Hamrick	1	1
64	Tracy Smothers	1	1
66	Cheech	1	¤N/A
66	Cloudy	1	¤N/A
