= Ian Rotten =

American professional wrestler and promoter (born 1970)

- Rotten in 2008

Personal information
- Born: John Benson Williams; June 1, 1970 (age 56) Baltimore, Maryland, U.S.

Professional wrestling career
- Ring name(s): Ian Rotten; Ian Bloody; Johnny Lawler; Zach Blades
- Billed height: 5 ft 9 in (175 cm)
- Billed weight: 279 lb (127 kg)
- Billed from: Louisville, Kentucky; The Fifth Ward, Houston, Texas; Newcastle, England
- Trained by: Axl Rotten
- Debut: August 10, 1990
- Retired: June 14, 2022

John Benson Williams (born June 1, 1970) is an American professional wrestler and promoter better known by his ring name Ian Rotten. He has wrestled in the Global Wrestling Federation (GWF), Extreme Championship Wrestling (ECW), the United States Wrestling Association (USWA), and his own wrestling promotion IWA: Mid-South.

== Professional wrestling career ==
=== Early career (1990-1992) ===
After becoming a fan of Dusty Rhodes and "Superstar" Billy Graham while growing up in Florida and Baltimore, Maryland, John Williams, began his career under the name Johnny Lawler, the storyline illegitimate son of Jerry "The King" Lawler. After a short stint as hockey gimmick Zach Blades, Williams went to wrestle in the Global Wrestling Federation.

=== The Bad Breed (1992-1995) ===
In GWF, Williams formed The Bad Breed, a tag team with Brian Knighton as brothers Ian and Axl Rotten, respectively. They defeated the Texas Mustangs (Bobby Duncum, Jr. & Johnny Hawk) for the GWF Tag Team Championship in January 1993, losing the titles shortly thereafter. In June 1994 in Extreme Championship Wrestling, the Bad Breed started a feud with The Public Enemy over the ECW Tag Team Championship, but never won the title.

=== Later career (1995-2022) ===
The Rotten brothers briefly feuded with each other prior to Williams' termination from ECW in late 1995. He moved to Kentucky, where he started a wrestling hotline followed by the IWA Mid-South promotion in early 1996. IWA was controversial for its use of violent and bloody hardcore wrestling. In 2008, IWA and Williams were investigated by Indiana State Police over the violence in their shows. In 2011, IWA shut down and was restarted by a third party, with Williams making occasional appearances.

== Personal life ==
Williams is the father of John Calvin Glenn, known also by the ring name of J.C. Rotten.

== Championships and accomplishments ==
- Anarchy Championship Wrestling
  - ACW Tag Team Championship (1 time) – with Drake Younger
- Global Wrestling Federation
  - GWF Tag Team Championship (1 time) – with Axl Rotten
- Independent Wrestling Association Mid-South
  - IWA Mid-South Heavyweight Championship (8 times)
  - IWA Mid-South Tag Team Championship (5 times) – with Axl Rotten (2), Cash Flo (1), Tarek the Great (1), and Mad Man Pondo (1)
  - IWA Mid-South King of the Deathmatch (1997, 2001)
- Juggalo Championship Wrestling
  - JCW Tag Team Championship (1 times) – with Lane Bloody
- NWA New Jersey
  - NWA United States Tag Team Championship (New Jersey version) (1 time) – with Blaze
- NWA Revolution
  - NWA Revolution Tag Team Championship (1 time) – with Danny McKay
- Pro Wrestling Illustrated
  - PWI Feud of the Year (1995) vs. Axl Rotten
- Westside Xtreme Wrestling
  - wXw World Heavyweight Championship (1 times)
  - wXw Hardcore Championship (1 time)
