= IWA Mid-South =

American independent professional wrestling promotion

- Acronym: IWA MS
- Founded: 1996
- Defunct: 2022
- Style: Professional wrestling Hardcore wrestling Strong style Death Match
- Headquarters: New Albany, Indiana
- Founder: Ian Rotten
- Owner: Ian Rotten
- Sister: IWA Deep South; IWA East Coast; IWA Texas; IWA Tri-State

Independent Wrestling Association (IWA) Mid-South (also known as IWA Mid-South, IWA-MS, and IWA Mid South Wrestling) was an American independent professional wrestling promotion based in New Albany, Indiana. It was formed by Ian Rotten in 1996.

== History ==
=== Hardcore wrestling ===
Independent Wrestling Association: Mid-South (IWA-MS) formed in 1996 in Louisville, Kentucky. The owner, Ian Rotten, is one of the first to bring hardcore style of wrestling to the United States with his feud with former tag team partner Axl Rotten. He formed the promotion shortly after being fired from Extreme Championship Wrestling in the mid-1990s. IWA Mid-South's first live event occurred on January 6, 1996, in New Albany, Indiana. On October 10, they held the first of what would become weekly shows in Louisville, Kentucky. April 3, 1997 saw IWA Mid-South crowned its first Heavyweight Champion, Tower of Doom, when he won a three way dance in the finals of a tournament.

=== Move to Indiana ===
Going into the year 2000, a series of incidents with the Kentucky Athletics Commission forced IWA Mid-South to move its operations to Charlestown, Indiana. In late 2000, IWA Mid-South started to make a slow shift to more technical based wrestlers and matches. During that year Dave Prazak became a featured manager, ring announcer, and commentator. He played a prominent role in bringing in Colt Cabana and CM Punk to join Chris Hero and other technical wrestlers. With this change brought the birth of the Ted Petty Invitational Tournament (TPI), then known as Sweet Science 16. The first TPI was held in 2000 and won by Chris Hero. During this time, a match featuring Punk and Hero lasted 92 minutes and has since been referred to by ESPN's SportsCenter as one of the longest sporting events.

In 2002, IWA Mid-South moved its base to Clarksville, Indiana. From 2003 to 2007, IWA Mid-South ran shows in a wide variety of venues, mostly Indiana and Illinois. During this span, they had a 51-month streak of running at least one show in every calendar month. IWA Mid-South then went on a planned hiatus, restarting operations with their 500th show on March 1, 2008.

On August 26, 2009, IWA Mid-South announced that it would cease its operations after the Kings of the Crimson Mask show on August 28. However, on November 3, IWA Mid-South announced that it would return with smaller budget shows, starting with Chapter 2: In The Beginning on November 20, 2009. On March 28, 2011, IWA Mid-South announced it would end operations immediately.

In July 2011, IWA Mid-South re-opened under new ownership. On September 16–17, 2011 the company returned with its annual King of the Death Match tournament. During that autumn, IWA Mid-South promoted a number of small shows in the Bellevue, Illinois area. IWA Mid-South then closed down once again.

In July 2013, Ian Rotten announced he was once again promoting shows under the IWA-MS banner, this time returning to the old Clarksville Arena. They ran multiple shows there before the building went under new ownership. They then relocated to Jammerz Rollerdrome also In Clarksville. They also ran at The ArenA based in Jeffersonville, Indiana before moving to the New IWA Arena at the Memphis Trading Post in Memphis, Indiana where they were running two shows a week, Thursday nights and Saturday nights. They then moved to the Axl Rotten memorial hall in Connersville, Indiana until 2021 when they relocated to the new IWA Wrestling Center in New Albany, Indiana where they began to regularly shows. They also ran occasionally in Indianapolis, Indiana.

On June 13, 2022, Heavyweight and Junior Heavyweight champion Jake Crist publicly called out Ian Rotten over not having been paid in a month, and proceeded to set fire to both belts in a bag. Fellow IWA-MS wrestlers John Wayne Murdoch and Satu Jinn announced they would pull out of the upcoming King of the Deathmatch 2022 event in response. The next day, IWA-MS abruptly announced on their Facebook page that all upcoming shows had been cancelled, leaving the promotion in hiatus once again.

=== Mike Levy incident ===
On June 21, 2008, during IWA's Queen of the Deathmatch tournament in Sellersburg, Indiana, experienced female wrestler Mickie Knuckles competed in a semi-finals match against a rookie wrestler from North Carolina named Mike Levy. Throughout the match, Knuckles delivered several stiff punches and weapon shots to Levy, going as far as legitimately headbutting him so hard that a lump formed on her head. After the match, IWA owner Ian Rotten joined his pre-teen son (who later became a wrestler under the name J. C. Rotten) and wrestlers Tank and Devon Moore in rushing the ring and legitimately attacking Levy, reportedly out of frustration with Levy for not selling Knuckles' offense well enough; the attack, which included stomping Levy's head into a ladder and beating him with crutches, resulted in serious injuries and heavy bleeding. This garnered heavy backlash and was investigated by Indiana State Police, but no charges were filed. Rotten claimed that the attack was staged and that Levy was allegedly "told upfront he was going to take an ass whooping". As of 2023, Levy remains active as a wrestler.

== Former championships ==
Championship	Date of entry	First champion	Date retired	Final champion	Years active	Notes
IWA World Championship	April 3, 1997	Tower of Doom	June 16, 2022	Jake Crist	1997-2022	On June 14, 2022, Crist vacated the title due to not being paid. Upon that, the company ceased operations, it became deactivated as a result.
IWA Mid-South Tag Team Championship	July 18, 1997	The War Machines (War Machine #1 and War Machine #2)	June 14, 2022	GKFAM (Piper and Prima Donny)	1997-2022	The titles became deactivated on June 14, 2022, upon the promotion ceasing operations.
IWA Mid-South Junior Heavyweight Championship	July 1, 2018	Logan James	June 14, 2022	Jake Crist	2018-2022	On June 14, 2022, Crist vacated the title due to not being paid. Upon that, the company ceased operations, it became deactivated as a result.
IWA Mid-South Women's Championship	June 11, 2005	Mickie Knuckles	June 14, 2022	Alice Crowley	2005-2002	The title became deactivated on June 14, 2022, upon the promotion ceasing operations.
IWA Mid-South Light Heavyweight Championship	January 6, 1996	American Kickboxer	2012	Devon Moore	1996-2013	Championship retired in 2013 for unknown reasons.
IWA Mid-South Strong Style Championship	March 1, 2008	Michael Elgin	December 6, 2008	Nick Gage	2008	Title at the 2008 Revolution Strong Style Tournament.
IWA Mid-South Hardcore Championship	April 15, 1999	Pete Madden	March 4, 2000	2 Tuff Tony	1999-2000	The Hardcore Championship was unified with the Heavyweight Championship in a three way match which also included Delilah Starr and Mad Man Pondo at Extreme Heaven.
IWA Mid-South Television Championship	September 30, 1997	Rollin' Hard	April 2, 1998	Shark Boy	1997-1998	Shark Boy defeated Chip Fairway at a live event and the championship was retired thereafter.
IWA Mid-South Deathmatch Championship	February 7, 2009	Drake Younger	December 6, 2008	Devon Moore	2007-2009	Championship retired on this date.

== Tournaments ==
Tournament	Latest winner	Date	Notes	Ref
Ted Petty Invitational	Tyler Matrix	April 24, 2021	Defeated Jake Crist and John Wayne Murdoch in the finals.	
IWA Mid-South King of the Deathmatch	Eric Ryan	July 31, 2021	Defeated Orin Veidt in the finals.	

== See also ==
- List of National Wrestling Alliance territories
- List of independent wrestling promotions in the United States
- International Wrestling Association
- International Wrestling Association of Japan
