= Memphis, Indiana =

- CDP
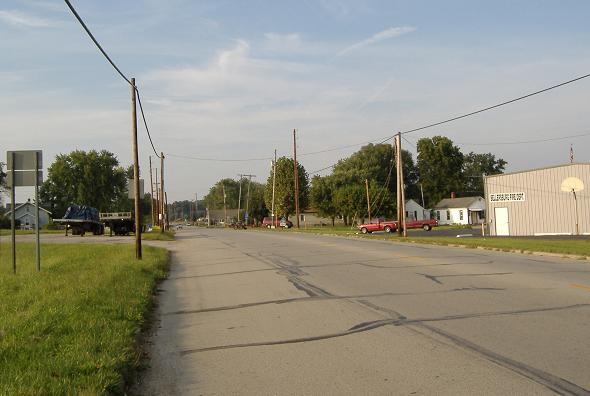
- US 31 in Memphis, Indiana

- Location of Memphis in Clark County, Indiana.
- Coordinates: 38°29′44″N 85°46′07″W
- Country: United States
- State: Indiana
- County: Clark
- Township: Union

Area
  - Total: 2.62 sq mi (6.79 km^{2})
  - Land: 2.60 sq mi (6.73 km^{2})
  - Water: 0.023 sq mi (0.06 km^{2})
- Elevation: 509 ft (155 m)

Population (2020)
  - Total: 1,077
  - Density: 414.6/sq mi (160.08/km^{2})
- Time zone: UTC-5 (Eastern (EST))
  - Summer (DST): UTC-4 (EDT)
- ZIP code: 47143
- Area code: 812
- FIPS code: 18-48384
- GNIS feature ID: 2393125

Memphis is a census-designated place (CDP) in Union Township, Clark County, Indiana, United States. The population was 1,077 at the 2020 census.

== History ==
A post office established at Memphis Indiana in 1854. The original settlers were from Memphis, Tennessee.

=== 2012 tornado outbreak ===
On March 2, 2012, a tornado between Henryville and Memphis damaged 15 homes on Broadway. Homes were also damaged on Stricker Rd. Volunteers from as far as Germany and Singapore went to Memphis to help.

== Geography ==
According to the United States Census Bureau, the CDP has a total area of 2.5 square miles (6.5 km^{2}), all land.

== Demographics ==
Historical population
| Census | Pop. | Note | %± |
|---|---|---|---|
| 2020 | 1,077 | | — |
U.S. Decennial Census

=== 2020 census ===
As of the 2020 census, Memphis had a population of 1,077. The median age was 33.5 years. 25.1% of residents were under the age of 18 and 12.4% of residents were 65 years of age or older. For every 100 females there were 98.3 males, and for every 100 females age 18 and over there were 94.9 males age 18 and over.

0.0% of residents lived in urban areas, while 100.0% lived in rural areas.

There were 410 households in Memphis, of which 35.4% had children under the age of 18 living in them. Of all households, 57.8% were married-couple households, 14.6% were households with a male householder and no spouse or partner present, and 20.5% were households with a female householder and no spouse or partner present. About 21.2% of all households were made up of individuals and 7.3% had someone living alone who was 65 years of age or older.

There were 430 housing units, of which 4.7% were vacant. The homeowner vacancy rate was 2.6% and the rental vacancy rate was 5.6%.

Racial composition as of the 2020 census
| Race | Number | Percent |
|---|---|---|
| White | 1,004 | 93.2% |
| Black or African American | 13 | 1.2% |
| American Indian and Alaska Native | 2 | 0.2% |
| Asian | 3 | 0.3% |
| Native Hawaiian and Other Pacific Islander | 0 | 0.0% |
| Some other race | 4 | 0.4% |
| Two or more races | 51 | 4.7% |
| Hispanic or Latino (of any race) | 25 | 2.3% |

=== 2000 census ===
As of the 2000 census, there were 400 people, 157 households, and 121 families residing in the CDP. The population density was 160.1 inhabitants per square mile (61.8/km^{2}). There were 168 housing units at an average density of 67.2 per square mile (25.9/km^{2}). The racial makeup of the CDP was 98.50% White, 0.50% Native American, 0.25% Pacific Islander, and 0.75% from two or more races.

There were 157 households, out of which 29.3% had children under the age of 18 living with them, 56.7% were married couples living together, 14.6% had a female householder with no husband present, and 22.3% were non-families. 19.1% of all households were made up of individuals, and 8.3% had someone living alone who was 65 years of age or older. The average household size was 2.55 and the average family size was 2.89.

In the CDP, the population was spread out, with 23.0% under the age of 18, 9.0% from 18 to 24, 28.0% from 25 to 44, 26.8% from 45 to 64, and 13.3% who were 65 years of age or older. The median age was 39 years. For every 100 females, there were 86.9 males. For every 100 females age 18 and over, there were 87.8 males.

The median income for a household in the CDP was $35,658, and the median income for a family was $41,528. Males had a median income of $31,250 versus $24,688 for females. The per capita income for the CDP was $20,054. About 5.9% of families and 5.9% of the population were below the poverty line, including none of those under the age of eighteen or sixty-five or over.
