= List of Juggalo Championship Wrestling events =

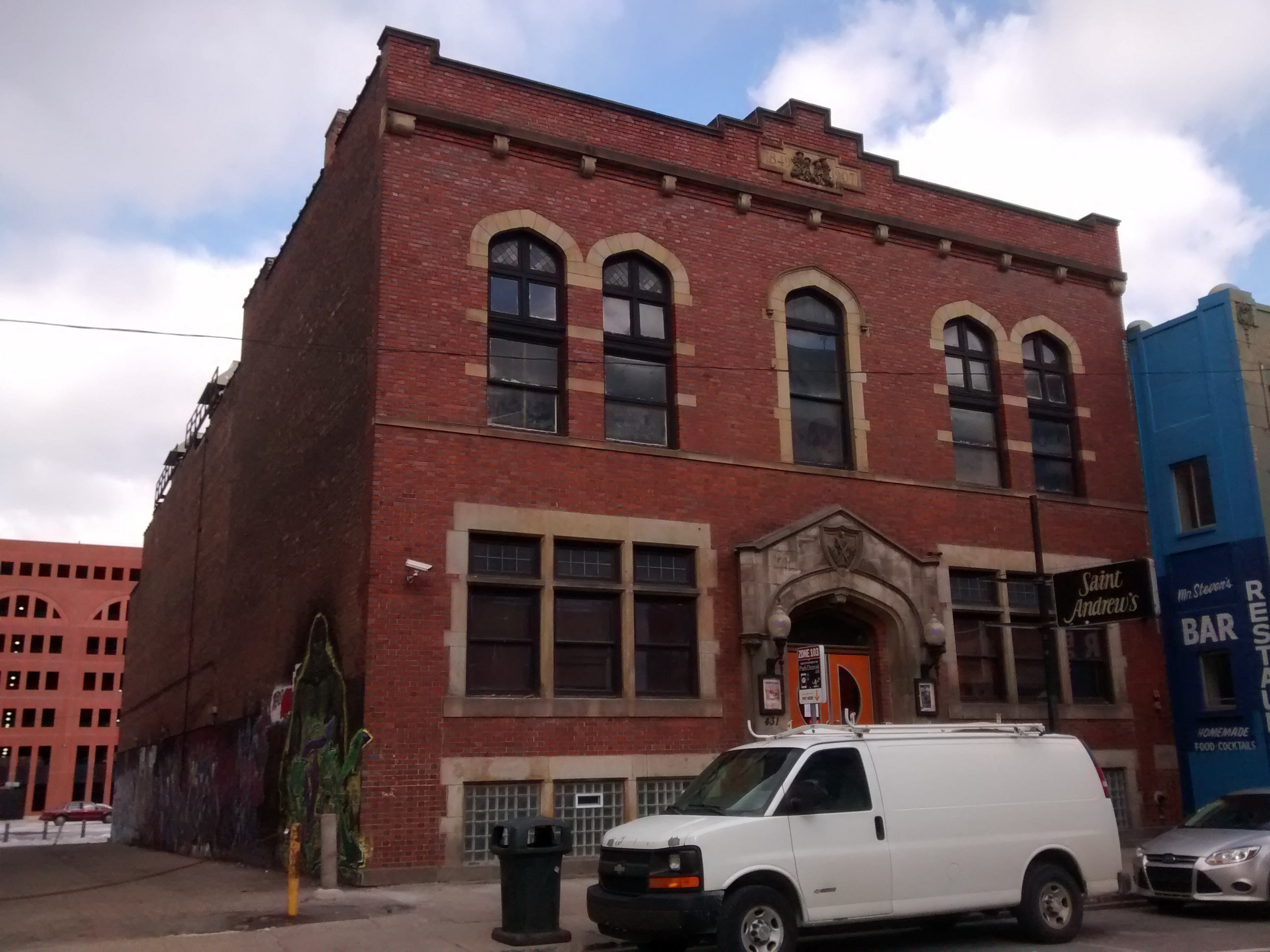
St. Andrews Hall hosted Juggalo Championship Wrestling's inaugural event JCW Volume 1

This is a list of Juggalo Championship Wrestling events, detailing all professional wrestling special events, tours, and pay-per-view events promoted by Juggalo Championship Wrestling, formerly Juggalo Championshxt Wrestling (JCW).

Since the founding of JCW in 1999 with its first event JCW Volume 1 taking place on December 19, 1999 in Detroit, the promotion has produced various events ranging from pay-per-views to non-broadcast events. In the early 2000s, JCW event releases on DVD had charted to as high as number 2 on the Billboard Sports and Recreation Top Sellers list. Since 2000, JCW has annually hosted professional wrestling shows at the Gathering of the Juggalos music festival organized by Insane Clown Posse's Psychopathic Records and since 2007 has held their signature event titled Bloodymania. Since 2024, several JCW events have been taped and aired as regular episodes of JCW Lunacy on their various tours or special episodes.

== Past events ==
=== Key ===
Show key
Color	Note
	Show aired as episodes of Lunacy
	Show aired as an episode of SlamTV!
	Special streamed event
	Pay-per-view event
	Non televised/streamed event
	DVD taping

=== 1999 ===
Date	Event	Venue	Location	Main Event	Notes	Type
December 19	JCW Volume 1	St. Andrews Hall	Detroit, Michigan	Insane Clown Posse (Shaggy 2 Dope and Violent J) vs. Tarek The Great and Truth Martini	Later released on May 9, 2000	
(c) – refers to the champion(s) heading into the match

=== 2000 ===
Date	Event	Venue	Location	Main Event	Notes	Type
April 14	Strangle-Mania Live Tour	Fillmore Auditorium	Denver, Colorado	Insane Clown Posse (Shaggy 2 Dope and Violent J) and DJ Willie B vs. Rainbow Coalition (Big Flame, Bob and Neil) in a six-man tag team match		
April 19	Strangle-Mania Live Tour	Eagles Club	Milwaukee, Wisconsin	—N/a	Taped as part of JCW Volume 2	
April 26	Strangle-Mania Live Tour	Electric Factory	Philadelphia, Pennsylvania	Insane Clown Posse (Shaggy 2 Dope and Violent J) and Vampiro vs. The Rainbow Coalition (Big Flame, Bob, and Neil) in a six man tag team match		
May 10	Strangle-Mania Live Tour	Agora Theatre	Cleveland, Ohio	Abdullah The Butcher vs. The Rude Boy in a steel cage match	Taped as part of JCW Volume 2	
July 21	Gathering of the Juggalos	Novi Expo Center	Novi, Michigan	—N/a		
July 22	Gathering of the Juggalos	Novi Expo Center	Novi, Michigan	—N/a		
(c) – refers to the champion(s) heading into the match

=== 2001 ===
Date	Event	Venue	Location	Main Event	Notes	Type
July 14	Gathering of the Juggalos	SeaGate Convention Centre	Toledo, Ohio	Sabu vs. Vampiro for the JCW Heavyweight Championship		
July 15	Gathering of the Juggalos	SeaGate Convention Centre	Toledo, Ohio	Battle Royal for the JCW Heavyweight Championship		
(c) – refers to the champion(s) heading into the match

=== 2002 ===
Date	Event	Venue	Location	Main Event	Notes	Type
July 20	Gathering of the Juggalos	Peoria Civic Center	Peoria, Illinois	Breyer Wellington (c) vs. Chris Candido for the JCW Heavyweight Championship		
July 21	Gathering of the Juggalos	Peoria Civic Center	Peoria, Illinois	Breyer Wellington (c) vs. Shaggy 2 Dope for the JCW Heavyweight Championship		
(c) – refers to the champion(s) heading into the match

=== 2003 ===
Date	Event	Venue	Location	Main Event	Notes	Type
March 16	JCW Volume 3	Newport Music Hall	Columbus, Ohio	Insane Clown Posse (Shaggy 2 Dope and Violent J) (c) vs Feminem & Kid Cock for the JCW Heavyweight Championship	Later released on November 11, 2003	
July 18	Gathering of the Juggalos	Nelson Ledges Quarry Park	Garrettsville, Ohio	Breyer Wellington and Lenny Lane vs. Insane Clown Posse (Shaggy 2 Dope and Violent J)		
July 19	Gathering of the Juggalos	Nelson Ledges Quarry Park	Garrettsville, Ohio	Nosawa and Insane Clown Posse (Shaggy 2 Dope and Violent J) vs. Breyer Wellington, Lenny Lane, and Monty Brown		
(c) – refers to the champion(s) heading into the match

=== 2004 ===
Date	Event	Venue	Location	Main Event	Notes	Type
July 16	Gathering of the Juggalos	Nelson Ledges Quarry Park	Garrettsville, Ohio	Insane Clown Posse (Shaggy 2 Dope and Violent J) vs. Kid Kash and Monty Brown		
July 17	Gathering of the Juggalos	Nelson Ledges Quarry Park	Garrettsville, Ohio	Insane Clown Posse (Shaggy 2 Dope and Violent J) and Terry Funk vs. Jerry Lawler, Kid Kash, and Monty Brown in a six-man tag team match		
July 18	Gathering of the Juggalos	Nelson Ledges Quarry Park	Garrettsville, Ohio	Sabu and Insane Clown Posse (Shaggy 2 Dope and Violent J) vs. Chuck Hogan, Mad Man Pondo, and Necro Butcher in a hardcore six man tag team match		
(c) – refers to the champion(s) heading into the match

=== 2005 ===
Date	Event	Venue	Location	Main Event	Notes	Type
July 22	Gathering of the Juggalos: JCW vs. TNA	Nelson Ledges Quarry Park	Garrettsville, Ohio	D-Ray 3000 and Petey Williams vs. Insane Clown Posse (Violent J and Shaggy 2 Dope)	Co-produced with Total Nonstop Action Wrestling	
July 23	Gathering of the Juggalos: JCW vs. TNA	Nelson Ledges Quarry Park	Garrettsville, Ohio	Terry Funk vs. 2 Tuff Tony vs. A-1 vs. Abyss vs. Chris Harris vs. Corporal Robinson vs. D-Ray 3000 vs. James Storm vs. Jeff Jarrett vs. Kid Kash vs. Mad Man Pondo vs. Petey Williams vs. Rhino vs. Samu vs. Shaggy 2 Dope vs. The Blue Meanie vs. Violent J in a battle royal for the vacant JCW Heavyweight Championship	Co-produced with Total Nonstop Action Wrestling	
July 24	Gathering of the Juggalos: JCW vs. TNA	Nelson Ledges Quarry Park	Garrettsville, Ohio	Insane Clown Posse (Shaggy 2 Dope and Violent J) vs. America's Most Wanted (Chris Harris and James Storm)	Co-produced with Total Nonstop Action Wrestling	
(c) – refers to the champion(s) heading into the match

=== 2006 ===
Date	Event	Venue	Location	Main Event	Notes	Type
July 14	Gathering of the Juggalos	Frontier Ranch	Pataskala, Ohio	Mad Man Pondo and The Headhunters (Headhunter A and Headhunter B) vs. Nosawa, Vampiro, and Violent J in a six-man tag team match		
July 15	Gathering of the Juggalos	Frontier Ranch	Pataskala, Ohio	Nosawa, Vampiro, and Violent J vs. Mad Man Pondo and The Powers Of Pain (The Barbarian and The Warlord) in a six-man tag team match		
October 31	Hallowicked After-Party	Fillmore Detroit	Detroit, Michigan	Mad Man Pondo (c) vs. Corporal Robinson for the JCW Heavyweight Championship		
November 18	Vendetta	New Alhambra Arena	Philadelphia, Pennsylvania	Devon Moore (c) vs. Trent Acid in a tables, ladders, and chairs match for the PWU Heavyweight Championship	Co-produced with Pro Wrestling Unplugged	
December 16	PWU vs. JCW	New Alhambra Arena	Philadelphia, Pennsylvania	Team PWU (Corporal Robinson, Johnny Kashmere, and Trent Acid) vs. Team JCW (2 Tuff Tony, Dyson Pryce, and Violent J) (w/Shaggy 2 Dope)	Co-produced with Pro Wrestling Unplugged	
(c) – refers to the champion(s) heading into the match

=== 2007 ===
Date	Event	Venue	Location	Main Event	Notes	Type
January 20	Cuffed and Caged: Last Man Standing	New Alhambra Arena	Philadelphia, Pennsylvania	Team JCW (2 Tuff Tony, Mad Man Pondo, Nosawa, Raven, and Violent J) (w/Shaggy 2 Dope) vs. Team PWU (Corporal Robinson, Gary Wolfe, Johnny Kashmere, Pete Hunter, and Trent Acid) (w/Tod Gordon) in a War Games elimination cage match	Co-produced with Pro Wrestling Unplugged	
February 17	Raven's Revenge?	New Alhambra Arena	Philadelphia, Pennsylvania	Corporal Robinson (c) vs. Raven in a last man standing match for the PWU Hardcore Championship	Co-produced with Pro Wrestling Unplugged	
February 25	Tempest Release Party Tour	Bogart's	Cincinnati, Ohio	Corporal Robinson (c) vs. Tracy Smothers for the JCW Heavyweight Championship		
February 26	Tempest Release Party Tour	Agora Ballroom	Cleveland, Ohio	Corporal Robinson (c) vs. Tracy Smothers for the JCW Heavyweight Championship		
February 27	Tempest Release Party Tour	The Intersection	Grand Rapids, Michigan	Corporal Robinson (c) vs. Nosawa for the JCW Heavyweight Championship		
February 28	Tempest Release Party Tour	First Avenue Club	Minneapolis, Minnesota	Corporal Robinson (c) vs. Mad Man Pondo (w/Necro Butcher) for the JCW Heavyweight Championship		
March 1	Tempest Release Party Tour	Beaumont Club	Kansas City, Missouri	Corporal Robinson (c) vs. KJ Hellfire for the JCW Heavyweight Championship		
March 2	Tempest Release Party Tour	Fillmore Auditorium	Denver, Colorado	2 Tuff Tony and Corporal Robinson vs. Mad Man Pondo and Necro Butcher		
March 3	Tempest Release Party Tour	Saltair	Salt Lake City, Utah	2 Tuff Tony vs. Mad Man Pondo		
March 4	Tempest Release Party Tour	New Oasis	Reno, Nevada	Zach Gowen vs. Necro Butcher (w/Mad Man Pondo)		
March 5	Tempest Release Party Tour	Fort Cheyenne Casino	Las Vegas, Nevada	Zach Gowen vs. Necro Butcher (w/Mad Man Pondo)		
March 6 (aired June 20)	West Side Wars	The Vault	Long Beach, California	Corporal Robinson (c) vs. Trent Acid for the JCW Heavyweight Championship		
March 7	Tempest Release Party Tour	Marquee Theatre	Tempe, Arizona	Zach Gowen vs. Trent Acid in a non title match		
March 9	Tempest Release Party Tour	Diamond Ballroom	Oklahoma City, Oklahoma	Mad Man Pondo vs. Necro Butcher		
March 10	Tempest Release Party Tour	Pop's Nightclub	Sauget, Illinois	Trent Acid vs. 2 Tuff Tony vs. Mad Man Pondo in a three way match		
March 14 (aired July 28)	East Side Wars	Electric Factory	Philadelphia, Pennsylvania	Trent Acid (c) vs. Corporal Robinson for the JCW Heavyweight Championship		
March 15	Tempest Release Party Tour	Rams Head Live	Baltimore, Maryland	Corporal Robinson (c) vs. Necro Butcher for the JCW Heavyweight Championship		
March 17	Tempest Release Party Tour	Worcester Palladium	Worcester, Massachusetts	2 Tuff Tony and Corporal Robinson vs. Mad Man Pondo and Necro Butcher		
March 19	Tempest Release Party Tour	Mr. Smalls Theatre	Millvale, Pennsylvania	2 Tuff Tony vs. Justin Credible		
March 20	Tempest Release Party Tour	St. Andrews Hall	Detroit, Michigan	Corporal Robinson (c) vs. Mitch Rider for the JCW Heavyweight Championship		
August 9	Gathering of the Juggalos	Hogrock Campgrounds	Cave-In-Rock, Illinois	N/A		
August 10	Gathering of the Juggalos	Hogrock Campgrounds	Cave-In-Rock, Illinois	N/A		
August 11	Bloodymania	Hogrock Campgrounds	Cave-In-Rock, Illinois	Sabu and Insane Clown Posse (Shaggy 2 Dope and Violent J) vs. Young Altar Boys and Trent Acid (Young Altar Boy #1 and Young Altar Boy #4) (w/Annie Social) in a six-man tag team match		
October 6	Evansville Invasion	Soldiers and Sailors Memorial Coliseum	Evansville, Indiana	Corporal Robinson (c) vs. Tracy Smothers (w/Lord Humongous) for the JCW Heavyweight Championship		
October 31 (aired November 17)	Hallowicked After Party	St. Andrews Hall	Detroit, Michigan	Juggalo World Order (Corporal Robinson and Scott Hall) vs. Breyer Wellington, Conrad Kennedy III, and Joe Doering in a three on two handicap match with Nosawa as the special guest referee		
December 21	Big Ballas' X-Mas Party	Clutch Cargo's	Pontiac, Michigan	Corporal Robinson (c) vs. Bull Pain in a barbed wire match for the JCW Heavyweight Championship		
(c) – refers to the champion(s) heading into the match

=== 2008 ===
Date	Event	Venue	Location	Main Event	Notes	Type
August 9	Bloodymania II	Hogrock Campgrounds	Cave-In-Rock, Illinois	Corporal Robinson (c) vs. Raven for the JCW Heavyweight Championship	Never released on video due to legal and contractual issues	
May 17	Hatchet Attacks	Red Rocks Amphitheatre	Morrison, Colorado	Corporal Robinson (c) vs. Akira Kawabata for the JCW Heavyweight Championship		
October 31	Hallowicked After-Party	Majestic Theatre	Detroit, Michigan	Corporal Robinson (c) vs. Tracy Smothers for the JCW Heavyweight Championship		
December 20	Big Ballas X-Mas Party	Eagle Theater	Pontiac, Michigan	Corporal Robinson (c) vs. Bull Pain for the JCW Heavyweight Championship		
(c) – refers to the champion(s) heading into the match

=== 2009 ===
Date	Event	Venue	Location	Main Event	Notes	Type
August 8	Oddball Wrestling	Hogrock Campgrounds	Cave-In-Rock, Illinois	Corporal Robinson (c) vs. Mad Man Pondo in an Electric Lighttubes Deathmatch for the JCW Heavyweight Championship		
August 9	Bloodymania III	Hogrock Campgrounds	Cave-In-Rock, Illinois	Corporal Robinson, The Insane Clown Posse (Shaggy 2 Dope and Violent J), Scott Hall, and Sid Vicious vs. The Young Alter Boys (Terry, Tim, Todd & Tom) and Trent Acid in a ten-man tag team match		
(c) – refers to the champion(s) heading into the match

=== 2010 ===
Date	Event	Venue	Location	Main Event	Notes	Type
March 20	Oddball Bonanza	Electric Factory	Philadelphia, Pennsylvania	Corporal Robinson (c) vs. Mad Man Pondo in a Thumbtacks & Lighttubes Deathmatch for the JCW Heavyweight Championship		
April 6	Bang! Pow! Boom! Nuclear Edition Release Party	The Crofoot	Pontiac, Michigan	Corporal Robinson (c) vs. Shawn Davari for the JCW Heavyweight Championship		
May 15	Happy Daze Tour	Meadow Brook Amphitheatre	Rochester Hills, Michigan	Corporal Robinson (c) vs. Justice Jones for the JCW Heavyweight Championship		
May 16	Happy Daze Tour	Lifestyle Communities Pavilion	Columbus, Ohio	Corporal Robinson (c) vs. Viper in an anything goes match for the JCW Heavyweight Championship		
May 17	Happy Daze Tour	Uptown Amphitheatre	Charlotte, North Carolina	Corporal Robinson (c) vs. Big Nasty for the JCW Heavyweight Championship		
May 22	Happy Daze Tour	Worcester Palladium	Worcester, Massachusetts	Corporal Robinson (c) vs. Mad Man Pondo for the JCW Heavyweight Championship		
May 24	Happy Daze Tour	Nautica Center	Cleveland, Ohio	Mad Man Pondo (c) vs. Toby Klein for the JCW Heavyweight Championship		
May 26	Happy Daze Tour	The Cabooze	Minneapolis, Minnesota	Mad Man Pondo (c) vs. Horace The Psychopath for the JCW Heavyweight Championship		
May 27	Happy Daze Tour	Westfair Amphitheater	Council Bluffs, Iowa	Mad Man Pondo (c) vs. Donnie Peppercricket for the JCW Heavyweight Championship		
May 28	Happy Daze Tour	Pop's Nightclub	Sauget, Illinois	Tracy Smothers vs. The Weedman		
May 29	Happy Daze Tour	Memorial Hall	Kansas City, Kansas	Corporal Robinson vs. Sir Bradley Charles		
May 31	Happy Daze Tour	Fillmore Auditorium	Denver, Colorado	Mad Man Pondo (c) vs. Corporal Robinson for the JCW Heavyweight Championship		
June 1	Happy Daze Tour	The Great Saltair	Salt Lake City, Utah	Corporal Robinson (c) vs. Mach Martinez for the JCW Heavyweight Championship		
June 4	Happy Daze Tour	Portland Expo Center	Portland, Oregon	Corporal Robinson (c) vs. Tommy Celcious for the JCW Heavyweight Championship		
June 7	Happy Daze Tour	Grove of Anaheim	Anaheim, California	Corporal Robinson (c) vs. Joey Ryan for the JCW Heavyweight Championship		
June 9	Happy Daze Tour	Marquee Theatre	Tempe, Arizona	Corporal Robinson (c) vs. Guzmania for the JCW Heavyweight Championship		
June 11	Happy Daze Tour	Marquee Theatre	Tempe, Arizona	Corporal Robinson and The Weedman vs. The Haters (Pauly Thomaselli and Vito Thomaselli)		
June 12	Happy Daze Tour	McGee Park Coliseum	Farmington, New Mexico	Corporal Robinson and The Weedman vs. The Haters (Pauly Thomaselli and Vito Thomaselli)		
August 14	Flashlight Wrestling: Legends & Loonies	Hogrock Campgrounds	Cave-In-Rock, Illinois	PG-13 (JC Ice and Wolfie D) vs. Gangrel and Kevin Thorn (w/Truth Martini)		
August 14	Oddball Wrestling	Hogrock Campgrounds	Cave-In-Rock, Illinois	Juggalo World Order (2 Tuff Tony and Corporal Robinson) vs. Donnie Peppercricket and Ian Rotten in a Falls Count Anywhere Taipei Deathmatch		
August 15	Bloodymania IV	Hogrock Campgrounds	Cave-In-Rock, Illinois	Corporal Robinson (w/Terry Funk) (c) vs. Mike Knox (w/Scott D'Amore) vs. Raven (w/Todd Bridges) in a Triple Threat match for the JCW Heavyweight Championship		
August 15	Flashlight Wrestling: Hangin' With Heroes	Hogrock Campgrounds	Cave-In-Rock, Illinois	Corporal Robinson (c) vs. Brian Christopher for the JCW Heavyweight Championship		
December 22	Violent Night	The Modern Exchange	Southgate, Michigan	2 Tuff Tony, Corporal Robinson, and The Jailbird Man (w/Shaggy 2 Dope and Violent J) vs. Bull Pain and The Haters (Pauly Thomaselli and Vito Thomaselli)		
(c) – refers to the champion(s) heading into the match

=== 2011 ===
Date	Event	Venue	Location	Main Event	Notes	Type
January 19	Cold Winter Fights	The Modern Exchange	Southgate, Michigan	Corporal Robinson (c) vs. Bull Pain in a Barbed Wire Massacre match for the JCW Heavyweight Championship		
February 9	Tag Team Tournament	The Modern Exchange	Southgate, Michigan	2 Tuff Tony and Corporal Robinson vs. Breyer Wellington and Butler Geeves	Show was shut down by police after 1 match.	
February 23	Flashlight Hysteria	The Modern Exchange	Southgate, Michigan	The Haters (Pauly Thomaselli and Vito Thomaselli) vs. 2 Tuff Tony and Corporal Robinson vs. Breyer Wellington and Butler Geeves vs. Bull Pain and Isabella Smothers vs. Mad Man Pondo and Necro Butcher vs. The Bump N Uglies (Bubba MacKenzie and Josh Movado) vs. The Jailbird Man and The Weedman vs. The Ring Rydas (Ring Ryda Blue and Ring Ryda Red) in an Eight Team Battle Royal for the vacant JCW Tag Team Championship		
March 9	Hardcore Hell	The Modern Exchange	Southgate, Michigan	Corporal Robinson (c) vs. Ian Rotten in a Barbed Wire, Thumbtacks And Broken Glass match for the JCW Heavyweight Championship		
March 23	Monster's Island	The Modern Exchange	Southgate, Michigan	Kongo Kong vs. Vampiro		
March 26	Hatchet Attacks	The Rave	Milwaukee, Wisconsin	Corporal Robinson (c) vs. Ian Rotten in a Barbed Wire, Tables, Ladders, and Glass match for the JCW Heavyweight Championship		
April 6	Lights, Camera, Bash 'Em	The Modern Exchange	Southgate, Michigan	2 Tuff Tony, Corporal Robinson, and Rhino vs. The Haters (Pauly Thomaselli and Vito Thomaselli)		
April 20	Up In Smoke	The Modern Exchange	Southgate, Michigan	Butler Geeves vs. Breyer Wellington vs. Corporal Robinson (c) in a Three Way No Disqualification and Falls Count Anywhere match for the JCW Heavyweight Championship		
May 4	St. Andrews Brawl	St. Andrews Hall	Detroit, Michigan	2 Tuff Tony and Rhino vs. Rob Conway and Sabu		
May 18	The Pony Down Throwdown	The Modern Exchange	Southgate, Michigan	Corporal Robinson vs. Breyer Wellington, Butler Geeves, and Truth Martini in a three on one handicap match		
June 30	Send in the Clowns	Clutch Cargo's	Pontiac, Michigan	2 Tuff Tony vs. Butler Geeves (c) (w/Breyer Wellington and Truth Martini) for the JCW Heavyweight Championship		
July 20	Above The Law	Clutch Cargo's	Pontiac, Michigan	Officer Colt Cabana (w/US Marshall Adam J. PearceAdam) vs. 2 Tuff Tony (c) for the JCW Heavyweight Championship		
July 28	F*** The Police	Clutch Cargo's	Pontiac, Michigan	Corporal Robinson vs. Officer Colt Cabana (c) for the JCW Heavyweight Championship		
August 12	Legends & Icons	Hogrock Campgrounds	Cave-In-Rock, Illinois	Roddy Piper (w/Bob Orton) vs. Terry Funk		
August 14	Bloodymania V	Hogrock Campgrounds	Cave-In-Rock, Illinois	Corporal Robinson (c) vs. Vampiro for the JCW Heavyweight Championship		
December 17	Big Ballas Christmas Party	St. Andrews Hall	Detroit, Michigan	2 Tuff Tony and Butler Geeves vs. Breyer Wellington, Kongo Kong, and Rob Conway (w/Miss Geeves and Truth Martini) in a Three on Two Handicap match		
December 31	New Year's Ninja Party	Worcester Palladium	Worcester, Massachusetts	2 Tuff Tony and Shockwave The Robot vs. The Head Bangers (Mosh and Thrasher)		
(c) – refers to the champion(s) heading into the match

=== 2012 ===
Date	Event	Venue	Location	Main Event	Notes	Type
May 26	Hatchet Attacks	McGee Park Memorial Coliseum	Farmington, New Mexico	2 Tuff Tony vs. Kongo Kong for the JCW Heavyweight Championship		
July 5	Road to Bloodymania 6	Taylor Town Trade Center	Taylor, Michigan	Corporal Robinson and The Rude Boy vs. The Nigerian Nightmares (Maifu and Saifu)		
July 6	Road to Bloodymania 6	The Orbit Room	Grand Rapids, Michigan	Madman Pondo and The Necro Butcher vs. Corporal Robinson and The Rude Boy in a No Holds Barred, No Count Out Falls Count Anywhere match		
July 7	Road to Bloodymania 6	Miramar Theater	Milwaukee, Wisconsin	Corporal Robinson vs. Ian Rotten in a falls count anywhere match		
August 8	Midnight at the Gathering	Hogrock Campgrounds	Cave-In-Rock, Illinois	Battle Royal		
August 9	Arena Chicks at The Gathering	Hogrock Campgrounds	Cave-In-Rock, Illinois	Shelly Martinez vs. Amber O'Neal		
August 11	Oddball Wrestling	Hogrock Campgrounds	Cave-In-Rock, Illinois	Shockwave The Robot, The Ring Rydas (Ring Ryda Blue and Ring Ryda Red), The Weedman and Vampiro vs. Bull Pain, Jake Manning, Officer Colt Cabana and The Headbangers (Mosh and Thrasher) in a ten-man tag team elimination match		
August 12	Bloodymania 6	Hogrock Campgrounds	Cave-In-Rock, Illinois	2 Tuff Tony (c) vs. Kongo Kong for the JCW Heavyweight Championship		
(c) – refers to the champion(s) heading into the match

=== 2013 ===
Date	Event	Venue	Location	Main Event	Notes	Type
February 16	Oddball Brawl	St. Andrews Hall	Detroit, Michigan	2 Tuff Tony (c) vs. Shawn Daivari for the JCW Heavyweight Championship		
February 17	Juggalo Day	St. Andrews Hall	Detroit, Michigan	—N/a		
August 9	Exotic Women of Wrestling	Hogrock Campgrounds	Cave-In-Rock, Illinois	Shelly Martinez vs. Miss Natural in a Bra and Panties Match		
August 10	Road to Bloodymania 7	Hogrock Campgrounds	Cave-In-Rock, Illinois	2 Tuff Tony (c) vs. The Boogeyman for the JCW Heavyweight Championship		
August 11	Bloodymania 7	Hogrock Campgrounds	Cave-In-Rock, Illinois	2 Tuff Tony and Vampiro vs. Kongo Kong and The Boogeyman		
October 31	Hallowicked After Party	St. Andrews Hall	Detroit, Michigan	2 Tuff Tony (c) vs. Necro Butcher for the JCW Heavyweight Championship		
December 31	Biggest Ballas Ever	The Crofoot	Pontiac, Michigan	Necro Butcher (c) vs. The Rude Boy for the JCW Heavyweight Championship		
(c) – refers to the champion(s) heading into the match

=== 2014 ===
Date	Event	Venue	Location	Main Event	Notes	Type
May 2	Road to the Gathering Tour	Center Stage	Kokomo, Indiana	The Rude Boy (c) vs. 2 Tuff Tony for the JCW Heavyweight Championship		
May 3	Road to the Gathering Tour	Rockstar Arena	Dayton, Ohio	The Rude Boy (c) vs. Necro Butcher vs. Viper in a three way match for the JCW Heavyweight Championship		
May 4	Road to the Gathering Tour	Headliners	Toledo, Ohio	Necro Butcher vs. Ron Mathis in a death match		
May 6	Road to the Gathering Tour	Beckley-Raleigh County Convention Center	Beckley, West Virginia	Necro Butcher vs. Smokey C in a death match		
May 8	Road to the Gathering Tour	Boot Scoot	Floyds Knobs, Indiana	Necro Butcher vs. Austin Bradley		
May 9	Road to the Gathering Tour	Pop's Nightclub	Sauget, Illinois	Necro Butcher vs. Deadly Dale		
May 11	Road to the Gathering Tour	Mojoe's	Joliet, Illinois	2 Tuff Tony (c) [Heavyweight] and The Ring Rydas (Ring Ryda Blue and Ring Ryda Red) (c) [Tag Team] vs.The American Viking and The Hooligans (Devin Cutter and Mason Cutter) in a six man tag team elimination match for the JCW Heavyweight Championship and JCW Tag Team Championship		
July 24	Exotic Ladies of Wrestling	Legend Valley	Thornville, Ohio	Mary Dobson vs. Cherry Bomb		
July 25	Road to Bloodymania 8	Legend Valley	Thornville, Ohio	2 Tuff Tony (c) vs. Jimmy Jacobs for the JCW Heavyweight Championship		
July 26	Bloodymania 8	Legend Valley	Thornville, Ohio	2 Tuff Tony (c) vs. Tommy Dreamer for the JCW Heavyweight Championship		
December 20	Big Ballas Christmas Party	St. Andrews Hall	Detroit, Michigan	2 Tuff Tony (c) vs. Jimmy Jacobs for the JCW Heavyweight Championship		
(c) – refers to the champion(s) heading into the match

=== 2015 ===
Date	Event	Venue	Location	Main Event	Notes	Type
January 23	JCW's Back Bitch!	The Crofoot	Pontiac, Michigan	2 Tuff Tony (c) vs. Officer Colt Cabana for the JCW Heavyweight Championship		
February 21	Take Me Home Charity Show	Detroit Masonic Temple	Detroit, Michigan	2 Tuff Tony (c) vs. The Weedman for the JCW Heavyweight Championship		
April 19	Smokin vs. Drinkin	The Crofoot	Pontiac, Michigan	2 Tuff Tony (c) vs. The Weedman for the JCW Heavyweight Championship		
July 24	Exotic Ladies of Wrestling	Legend Valley	Thornville, Ohio	Crazy Mary Dobson vs. LuFisto		
July 25	Oddball Brawl	Legend Valley	Thornville, Ohio	Mosh Pit Mike vs. Jeff Cannonball vs. Matt Tremont vs. Ron Mathis in a light tubes broken glass four way death match		
July 26	Bloodymania 9	Legend Valley	Thornville, Ohio	The Weedman (c) vs. 2 Tuff Tony vs. Matt Hardy in a three-way match for the JCW Heavyweight Championship		
October 31	Hallowicked After Party	St. Andrews Hall	Detroit, Michigan	The Weedman (c) vs. Kongo Kong for the JCW Heavyweight Championship		
December 10	The Incredible Rassle Rap Charity Festival Tour	Big Shot	Valparaiso, Indiana	The Weedman (c) vs. Kongo Kong for the JCW Heavyweight Championship		
December 11	The Incredible Rassle Rap Charity Festival Tour	Pop's Nightclub	Sauget, Illinois	The Weedman vs. Ruff Crossing in a lumberjack match		
(c) – refers to the champion(s) heading into the match

=== 2016 ===
Date	Event	Venue	Location	Main Event	Notes	Type
February 19	Juggalo Day	St. Andrews Hall	Detroit, Michigan	Spider Monkey and Super Strong Tiger (c) vs. The Ring Rydas (Ring Ryda Blue and Ring Ryda Red) for the JCW Tag Team Championship		
July 21	Strangle-Mania Live: Deathmatch Madness	Legend Valley	Thornville, Ohio	Ron Matthis vs. Billy Bob vs. Bull Bronson vs. Stryknyn in a barbed wire fatal four way match		
July 22	Bloodymania 10	Legend Valley	Thornville, Ohio	Kongo Kong (c) vs. Jeff Hardy vs. Willie Mack in a triple threat match for the JCW Heavyweight Championship		
(c) – refers to the champion(s) heading into the match

=== 2017 ===
Date	Event	Venue	Location	Main Event	Notes	Type
February 17	Juggalo Weekend	Jannus Landing	St. Petersburg Florida	Kongo Kong (c) vs. Bushwhacker Luke for the JCW Heavyweight Championship		
February 18	Juggalo Weekend	Jannus Landing	St. Petersburg Florida	Kongo Kong (c) vs. Jesse Neal for the JCW Heavyweight Championship		
April 7	Canadian Juggalo Weekend	Stampede Corral	Calgary, Alberta, Canada	—N/a		
July 26	Exotic Ladies of Wrestling	Lost Lakes Amphitheater	Oklahoma City, Oklahoma	Trina The Toxic Clown vs. Machiko		
July 27	Lama Nama Lucha Libre	Lost Lakes Amphitheater	Oklahoma City, Oklahoma	—N/a		
July 28	Bloodymania 11	Lost Lakes Amphitheater	Oklahoma City, Oklahoma	Kongo Kong (c) vs. Hy Zaya vs. Shane Mercer in a three-way match for the JCW Heavyweight Championship		
August 26	Carnival of Carnage	El Club	Detroit, Michigan	Alcatraz vs. Rod Street		
October 31	Hallowicked	Russell Industrial Center	Detroit, Michigan	Kongo Kong (c) vs. Eric Darkstorm for the JCW Heavyweight Championship		
(c) – refers to the champion(s) heading into the match

=== 2018 ===
Date	Event	Venue	Location	Main Event	Notes	Type
February 16	Juggalo Weekend	Fremont Country Club	Las Vegas, Nevada	Mosh Pit Mike vs. Beast The Freak vs. Freak Show vs. The Human Tornado in a four-way match		
February 17	Juggalo Weekend	Fremont Country Club	Las Vegas, Nevada	Chuey Martinez vs. Homeless Jimmy		
July 18	Battle of the Sexes	Legend Valley	Thornville, Ohio	Kiera Hogan and Shane Mercer vs. Desi Derata and Hy-Zaya		
July 19	Oddball Wrestling	Legend Valley	Thornville, Ohio	Mosh Pit Mike vs. Homeless Jimmy in a house vs. hair match		
July 20	Bloodymania 12	Legend Valley	Thornville, Ohio	Kongo Kong (c) vs. Shane Mercer in an anything goes match for the JCW Heavyweight Championship		
October 31	Hallowicked	Russell Industrial Center	Detroit, Michigan	Shane Mercer (c) vs. Hy-Zaya for the JCW Heavyweight Championship		
December 22	Big Ballas X-Mas Party	Token Lounge	Westland, Michigan	The Mysterious Movado (c) vs. Rod Street for the IBW Heavyweight Championship		
(c) – refers to the champion(s) heading into the match

=== 2019 ===
Date	Event	Venue	Location	Main Event	Notes	Type
July 31	Wonder Women of Wrestling	Shimmer Forest	Springville, Indiana	—N/a		
August 1	Superheroes of Wrestling	Shimmer Forest	Springville, Indiana	Sabu vs. Kongo Kong		
August 2	Soopamania	Shimmer Forest	Springville, Indiana	The Rude Boy (w/Joel Gertner) vs. Violent J (w/Shaggy 2 Dope) in a double retirement match		
(c) – refers to the champion(s) heading into the match

=== 2020 ===
Date	Event	Venue	Location	Main Event	Notes	Type
October 17	Red Moon Howling	Violent J's home	Milford, Michigan	Rhino vs. Jackson Stone		
December 16	Bring Down The House	Violent J's home	Milford, Michigan	Teddy Hart (c) vs. 2 Tuff Tony for the JCW Heavyweight Championship		
(c) – refers to the champion(s) heading into the match

=== 2021 ===
Date	Event	Venue	Location	Main Event	Notes	Type
February 20	The Best of Oddball Brutality	Psychopathic Records Headquarters	Farmington Hills, Michigan	Madman Pondo vs. AKIRA		
April 10	Fenced in Fury at the Folsom Felony Funhouse	Psychopathic Records Headquarters	Farmington Hills, Michigan	Chuey Martinez and Mosh Pit Mike vs. Brothers of Funstruction (Ruffo The Clown and Yabo The Clown)		
June 23	Blackout Brutality	Majestic Theatre	Detroit, Michigan	Madman Pondo vs. Breyer Wellington (w/Jeremiah Goldmain)		
August 20	Bloodymania 14	Legend Valley	Thornville, Ohio	2 Tuff Tony (c) vs. Vampiro for the JCW Heavyweight Championship		
(c) – refers to the champion(s) heading into the match

=== 2022 ===
Date	Event	Venue	Location	Main Event	Notes	Type
August 6 (aired August 12)	Bloodymania 15	Legend Valley	Thornville, Ohio	Vampiro vs. Delirious vs. Joshua Bishop in a three way electrified cage match		
March 7	Panic in Pontiac	The Crofoot	Pontiac, Michigan	Brothers of Funstruction (Ruffo The Clown and Yabo The Clown) (c) vs. Chuey Martinez and Mosh Pit Mike for the JCW Tag Team Championship		
October 31	Hallowicked	Harpos Theater	Detroit, Michigan	Kongo Kong vs. Isaiah Broner vs. Jackson Stone in a three-way match		
(c) – refers to the champion(s) heading into the match

=== 2023 ===
Date	Event	Venue	Location	Main Event	Notes	Type
April 15	Day for Donald	Victory Gym	Brownstown, Michigan	Chuey Martinez and Mosh Pit Mike vs. Chuck Stein and Sean Tyler	Co-produced with Pro Wrestling All-Stars of Detroit	
August 6	Bloodymania 16	Legend Valley	Thornville, Ohio	Joshua Bishop vs. Joey Janela vs. Matthew Justice vs. Tom Lawlor in a four-way match for the vacant JCW Heavyweight Championship		
October 31	Hallowicked	Detroit Masonic Temple	Detroit, Michigan	Joshua Bishop (c) vs. Joey Janela for the JCW Heavyweight Championship		
(c) – refers to the champion(s) heading into the match

=== 2024 ===
Date	Event	Venue	Location	Main Event	Notes	Type
February 23	Juggalo Weekend	Boeing Center at Tech Port	San Antonio, Texas	Willie Mack vs. Alex Taylor vs. Bino Bleu vs. Boss Baines vs. Caramel Lightning vs. Dyl Dempsey vs. Hurtful Kurt vs. James Ellsworth vs. Kerry Morton vs. Kobe Dalen Payne vs. Kongo Kong vs. Landon Chavez vs. Mosh Pit Mike vs. Mystii Marks vs. Painful Paul vs. Rodney Mack vs. Ruffo The Clown vs. Silas Mason vs. Sodapop vs. Stewy The Clown vs. The Executioner Verdugo vs. Xavier Gotti vs. Yabo The Clown vs. Zusz in a battle royal for the JCW Heavyweight Championship		
February 24	Juggalo Weekend	Boeing Center at Tech Port	San Antonio, Texas	Mad Man Pondo vs. Dimitri Alexandrov in a death match		
May 3 (aired August 28, September 4, September 11, and September 18)	Juggalos Strike Back	Newport Music Hall	Columbus, Ohio	Brothers of Funstruction (Ruffo The Clown and Yabo The Clown) (c) vs. Southern Six (James Storm and Kerry Morton) (w/Alex Taylor and Silas Mason) for the JCW Tag Team Championship		
July 25	Three Town Beatdown	Piere's Entertainment Center	Fort Wayne, Indiana	Willie Mack (c) vs. Sami Callihan for the JCW Heavyweight Championship		
July 26	Three Town Beatdown	MegaCorp Pavilion	Newport, Kentucky	Willie Mack (c) vs. Breyer Wellington for the JCW Heavyweight Championship		
July 27	Three Town Beatdown	The Crofoot	Pontiac, Michigan	Willie Mack (c) vs. Hurtful Kurt for the JCW Heavyweight Championship		
August 13	Free-For-All	Mill Dam Corner Grille	Hebron, Ohio	Willie Mack (c) vs. Silas Mason (w/Danny Deals) for the JCW Heavyweight Championship		
August 15	Gathering of the Juggalos	Legend Valley	Thornville, Ohio	Caleb Konley vs. 2 Tuff Tony vs. Alex Taylor vs. Breyer Wellington vs. Chris Malvado vs. Deputy Dickhead and Dick Ramirez vs. Jeeves vs. JP Grayson vs. Kerry Morton and Kongo Kong vs. Matt Cross vs. Mosh Pit Mike vs. Painful Paul vs. Super Beast vs. The Green Phantom vs. Tommy Grayson in a battle royal for the JCW American Championship		
August 16	Bloodymania 17	Legend Valley	Thornville, Ohio	Mad Man Pondo vs. JJ Allin vs. Nick Gage in a three-way match		
October 23	Train of Terror Tour	Brooklyn Bowl	Nashville, Tennessee	The Southern Six (Alex Taylor, Kerry Morton, and Silas Mason) vs. 2 Tuff Tony, Ricky Morton, and Tarzan Duran	Live broadcast	
October 24	Train of Terror Tour	Iron City	Birmingham, Alabama	Matt Cross (c) vs. James Storm for the JCW Heavyweight Championship	Live broadcast	
October 25	Train of Terror Tour	Little Rock Hall	Little Rock, Arkansas	Matt Cross and Willie Mack vs. Kongo Kong and Mecha Wolf	Live broadcast	
October 26	Train of Terror Tour	The Blue Note	Columbia, Missouri	Matt Cross (c) vs. Kongo Kong for the JCW Heavyweight Championship	Live broadcast	
October 27	Train of Terror Tour	The Hawthorn	St. Louis, Missouri	Matt Cross (c) vs. Breyer Wellington for the JCW Heavyweight Championship	Live broadcast	
October 28	Train of Terror Tour	Eagles Club	Milwaukee, Wisconsin	Matt Cross (c) vs. Simon Gotch for the JCW Heavyweight Championship	Live broadcast	
October 29	Train of Terror Tour	The Forge	Joliet, Illinois	Matt Cross (c) vs. Babathunder for the JCW Heavyweight Championship	Live broadcast	
October 30	Devil's Night	Majestic Theatre	Detroit, Michigan	Matt Cross (c) vs. Willie Mack vs. Mecha Wolf for the JCW Heavyweight Championship		
October 31	Hallowicked	Detroit Masonic Temple	Detroit, Michigan	Matt Cross and Willie Mack vs. Mecha Wolf and Jesus Rodriguez	Live broadcast	
November 30	Spanks Givin'	Grizzly's Bar & Grill	Wyandotte, Michigan	The Southern Six (Alex Taylor, Kerry Morton, and Silas Mason) vs. Matt Cross, Mickie Knuckles, and Willie Mack in a six-man tag team match		
December 4	March of Madness Tour	Little Rock Hall	Little Rock, Arkansas	Willie Mack (c) vs. Silas Mason for the JCW Heavyweight Championship	Live broadcast	
December 5	March of Madness Tour	The Hawthorn	St. Louis, Missouri	2 Tuff Tony, Mickie Knuckles, and Willie Mack vs. The Southern Six (Alex Taylor, Kerry Morton, and Silas Mason)	Live broadcast	
December 19	Deck The Jaws	Majestic Theatre	Detroit, Michigan	Willie Mack (c) vs. Kongo Kong for the JCW Heavyweight Championship		
December 21 (aired January 15 and 29, 2025)	Big Ballas Holiday Party	KEMBA Live!	Columbus, Ohio	Willie Mack (c) vs. Colby Corino for the JCW Heavyweight Championship		
(c) – refers to the champion(s) heading into the match

=== 2025 ===
Date	Event	Venue	Location	Main Event	Notes	Type
February 14 (aired February 27 and March 13)	Juggalo Weekend	Worcester Palladium	Worcester, Massachusetts	Willie Mack (c) vs. The Misfit for the JCW Heavyweight Championship		
February 15 (aired March 20)	Juggalo Weekend	Worcester Palladium	Worcester, Massachusetts	Willie Mack (c) vs. Matt Cross for the JCW Heavyweight Championship		
March 28	JCW vs. ALW Wicked Game	Space Coast Convention Center	Cocoa, Florida	Jason Dugan and Renee Michelle (w/David Millan) vs. Aleah James and Ryzin	Co-produced with Atomic Legacy Wrestling	
April 24 (aired May 1 and May 8)	Hella Pain & Diamond Rain Tour	Apollo Theatre	Belvidere, Illinois	Colby Corino vs. Mickie Knuckles		
April 25 (aired May 13 and May 22)	Hella Pain & Diamond Rain Tour	The Forge	Joliet, Illinois	Willie Mack (c) vs. Kerry Morton for the JCW Heavyweight Championship		
April 26 (aired May 29 and June 5)	Hella Pain & Diamond Rain Tour	TempleLive at Cleveland Masonic	Cleveland, Ohio	Kerry Morton (c) vs. Facade for the JCW Heavyweight Championship		
April 27 (aired June 12)	Hella Pain & Diamond Rain Tour	Columbus Athenaeum	Columbus, Ohio	2 Tuff Tony (w/Violent J) vs. Shane Mercer		
June 21	JCW vs. Imperial Pro Wrestling Invasion	Bristol National Guard Armory	Bristol, Tennessee	Casey King vs. Alex Monroe vs. CJ Knight vs. Crazo vs. Dre White vs. Jason Kincaid vs. Johnny Youngblood vs. Luis Cortez vs. Nick Hammonds vs. Richard Wellington vs. Wild Bill in a battle royal	Co-produced with Imperial Pro Wrestling	
July 17	Showcase Showdown: The Violence is Right	Majestic Theatre	Detroit, Michigan	Mad Man Pondo (c) vs. Matt Tremont in a death match for the JCW Heavyweight Championship	Co-produced with Game Changer Wrestling	
August 1	Powder Keg	Williams Center	Rutherford, New Jersey	Team GCW (1 Called Manders, John Wayne Murdoch, and Matt Tremont) vs. Team JCW Hall of Famers (2 Tuff Tony, Mad Man Pondo, and Mickie Knuckles)	Held in conjunction with Game Changer Wrestling's SummerSmash Weekend	
August 12	Gathering of the Juggalos	Legend Valley	Thornville, Ohio	Willie Mack vs. Marcus Mathers	Live broadcast	
August 14	JCW vs. GCW The 2 Day War	Legend Valley	Thornville, Ohio	Brothers of Funstruction (Ruffo The Clown and Yabo The Clown) (JCW) vs. YDNP (Alec Price and Jordan Oliver) (GCW) for the JCW Tag Team Championship and GCW Tag Team Championship	Co-produced with Game Changer Wrestling Also referred to as Bloodymania 18	
August 15	JCW vs. GCW The 2 Day War	Legend Valley	Thornville, Ohio	Matt Tremont (c) vs. 2 Tuff Tony in a barbed wire death match for the JCW Heavyweight Championship	Co-produced with Game Changer Wrestling Also referred to as Bloodymania 18	
September 13 (aired September 25)	Ultra Live Monster 5: Juggalo Island Show	Clayton's Beach Bar & Event Venue	South Padre Island, Texas	2 Tuff Tony and Amazing Maria vs. Luscious Lawrence and Haley J		
September 15 (aired October 9)	Houston Heat	White Oak Music Hall	Houston, Texas	2 Tuff Tony (c) vs. Kongo Kong (w/Jasmin St. Claire and Mr. Happy) for the JCW Heavyweight Championship		
September 18 (aired October 30)	2 Tuff Country	The ArenA	Jeffersonville, Indiana	2 Tuff Tony (c) vs. Matt Cardona for the JCW Heavyweight Championship		
October 31 (aired January 1, 2026)	Hallowicked	Detroit Masonic Temple	Detroit, Michigan	2 Tuff Tony (c) vs. Matt Cardona in a Carnival of Carnage match for the JCW Heavyweight Championship		
December 19 (aired January 15, 2026)	Big Ballas Holiday Party	Eagles Club	Milwaukee, Wisconsin	Kerry Morton vs. Caleb Konley		
(c) – refers to the champion(s) heading into the match

=== 2026 ===
Date	Event	Venue	Location	Main Event	Notes	Type
January 17 (aired January 29 and February 19)	Carnival of Chaos Tour	Summit Music Hall	Denver, Colorado	Luciano Family Enterprises (Mickie Knuckles and PCO) vs. Brothers of Funstruction (Ruffo The Clown and Yabo The Clown) in a non title Funhouse rules match		
January 18 (aired February 5 and February 12)	Carnival of Chaos Tour	Sunshine Theater	Albuquerque, New Mexico	Luciano Family Enterprises (Mickie Knuckles and PCO) vs. St. Claire Monster Corporation (Kongo Kong and Mr. Happy (w/Jasmin St. Claire)		
February 27	Juggalo Weekend	Factory Town	Hialeah, Florida	Mr. Anderson (c) vs. Kerry Morton for the JCW World Heavyweight Championship		
February 28	Juggalo Weekend	Factory Town	Hialeah, Florida	Mr. Anderson (c) vs. CoKane for the JCW World Heavyweight Championship		
March 20 (aired April 9)	March Massacre Tour	Harpos Concert Theatre	Detroit, Michigan	CoKane (c) vs. Steven Flowe for the JCW World Heavyweight Championship		
March 21 (aired April 16)	March Massacre Tour	The Vault	Saginaw, Michigan	CoKane (c) vs. Shane Mercer for the JCW World Heavyweight Championship		
March 22	Panic Zone	Grewal Hall at 224	Lansing, Michigan	Nic Nemeth vs. Kerry Morton and Shane Mercer in a handicap match		
April 17	Strangle-Mania: Viva Las Violence	Horseshoe Las Vegas	Paradise, Nevada	Vampiro (w/Insane Clown Posse) vs. PCO vs. Big Vito in a three way match	Held in conjunction with Game Changer Wrestling's Collective	
May 21	The Assault	King of Clubs	Columbus, Ohio	Gisele Shaw vs. Freya The Slaya (w/Breyer Wellington) in a three match series	Live broadcast	
May 22 (aired May 28)	Mayday! On the Front Lines	Harpos Concert Theatre	Detroit, Michigan	Kerry Morton vs. Future Endeavors (Matt Cross and Shane Mercer) in a handicap match		
May 23 (aired June 4)	Mayday! On the Front Lines	The Vault	Saginaw, Michigan	2 Tuff Tony and Willie Mack (c) vs. Luciano Family Enterprises (Sally Boy and Vincenzo) (w/Big Vito) for the JCW Tag Team Championship		
May 24 (aired June 11 and 18)	Mayday! On the Front Lines	Grewal Hall at 224	Lansing, Michigan	CoKane (c) vs. Caleb Konley for the JCW World Heavyweight Championship		
June 19 (aired June 25 and July 2)	Gorilla Monsoon June	Majestic Theatre	Detroit, Michigan	Josh Bishop (w/Joel Gertner) vs. Future Endeavors (Matt Cross and Shane Mercer in a handicap match		
June 20 (aired June 9 and 16)	Gorilla Monsoon June	The Vault	Saginaw, Michigan	Caleb Konley (c) vs. Josh Bishop for the JCW World Heavyweight Championship		
June 21 (aired July 23 and 30)	Gorilla Monsoon June	Grewal Hall at 224	Lansing, Michigan	Caleb Konley vs. Kerry Morton		
July 24 (aired August 6 and 13)	Superfly July	King of Clubs	Columbus, Ohio	EC3 vs. Krule		
August 20	Gathering of the Juggalos	Mother Nature's Riverfront Retreat	Macks Creek, Missouri	EC3 (w/Violent J, Willie Mack, Yabo The Clown, Ruffo The Clown, and 2 Tuff Tony) vs. Donovan Dijak (w/Big Vito, Sally Boy, and Vincenzo)	Live broadcast	
August 21	Bloodymania 19	Mother Nature's Riverfront Retreat	Macks Creek, Missouri	Luciano Family (Sally Boy, and Vincenzo), Painful Paul, Krule, and Donovan Dijak (with Big Vito and Jasmin St. Claire) vs. Juggalo World Order (2 Tuff Tony, Willie Mack, Ruffo The Clown, EC3, and Jeeves) (with Insane Clown Posse) in a GoreGames elimination match		
September 17	99 Rewind	Diesel Concert Lounge	New Baltimore, Michigan	2 Tuff Tony and CoKane vs. The Backseat Boyz (Tommy Grayson and JP Grayson)		
September 24	Carnival of Chaos	The ArenA	Jeffersonville, Indiana	Caleb Konley (c) vs. Shane Mercer for the JCW World Heavyweight Championship	Live broadcast	
October 11 (aired October 29 and November 5)	Shocktober Slam	Diamondback Music Hall	Van Buren Township, Michigan	Caleb Konley (c) vs. CoKane vs. EC3 (w/Jeeves) vs. Josh Bishop (w/Joel Gertner) for the JCW World Heavyweight Championship		
October 31 (airing November 12)	Hallowicked	Detroit Masonic Temple	Detroit, Michigan	Caleb Konley (c) vs. Nic Nemeth for the JCW World Heavyweight Championship		
November 13 (airing November 19)	Skankfest	Mardi Gras World	New Orleans, Louisiana	TBA	Held in conjunction with Skankfest	
November 14 (airing November 26)	Skanksgiving	Mardi Gras World	New Orleans, Louisiana	TBA	Held in conjunction with Skankfest	
(c) – refers to the champion(s) heading into the match

== Upcoming events ==
=== 2026 ===
Date	Event	Venue	Location	Main Event	Notes	Type
November 28	Hillbilly Jim Appreciation Night	The Vault	Saginaw, Michigan	TBA		
November 29	Gilberg Appreciation Night	Diamondback Music Hall	Van Buren Township, Michigan	TBA		
December 13	Big Ballas Holiday Party	Newport Music Hall	Columbus, Ohio	TBA		
(c) – refers to the champion(s) heading into the match

=== 2027 ===
Date	Event	Venue	Location	Main Event	Notes	Type
August	Bloodymania 20	TBA	TBA	TBA		
(c) – refers to the champion(s) heading into the match
