= Bloodymania 5 =

2011 Juggalo Championship Wrestling event

- Promotion: Juggalo Championship Wrestling
- Date: August 14, 2011
- City: Cave-In-Rock, Illinois
- Venue: Hogrock Campground

Juggalo Championship Wrestling event chronology
| ← Previous; Legends & Icons | Next → Big Ballas Christmas Party |

Bloodymania chronology
| ← Previous; Bloodymania IV | Next → Bloodymania 6 |

Bloodymania 5 was a professional wrestling pay-per-view (PPV) event produced by Juggalo Championship Wrestling (JCW), which was only available online via Psychopathic Live. It took place at midnight on August 14, 2011 during the Gathering of the Juggalos at Hog Rock in Cave-In-Rock, Illinois. Professional wrestling is a type of sports entertainment in which theatrical events are combined with a competitive sport. The buildup to the matches and the scenarios that took place before, during, and after the event, were planned by JCW's script writers. The event starred wrestlers from Juggalo Championship Wrestling's bi-weekly internet wrestling show.

Nine matches were held on the event's card. The main event match was a JCW Heavyweight Championship match that featured the champion Corporal Robinson defeating Vampiro. Featured matches on the undercard included a tag team match where the team of 2 Tuff Tony and The Weedman defeated Officer Colt Cabana and Adam Pearce, a singles match that saw Kongo Kong defeat Rhino, and a four-team tag team match for the JCW Tag Team Championship in which the team of Raven and Sexy Slim Goody defeated Mean Old Bastards (Tracy Smothers and Bull Pain), Mad Man Pondo and Necro Butcher, and the champion Ring Rydas.

== Background ==
Bloodymania 5 featured professional wrestling matches that involved different wrestlers from pre-existing scripted feuds, plots, and storylines that were played at Juggalo Championship Wrestling's bi-weekly events. Wrestlers were portrayed as either villains or heroes as they followed a series of events that built tension, and culminated in a wrestling match or series of matches. The event featured wrestlers from Juggalo Championship Wrestling's roster.

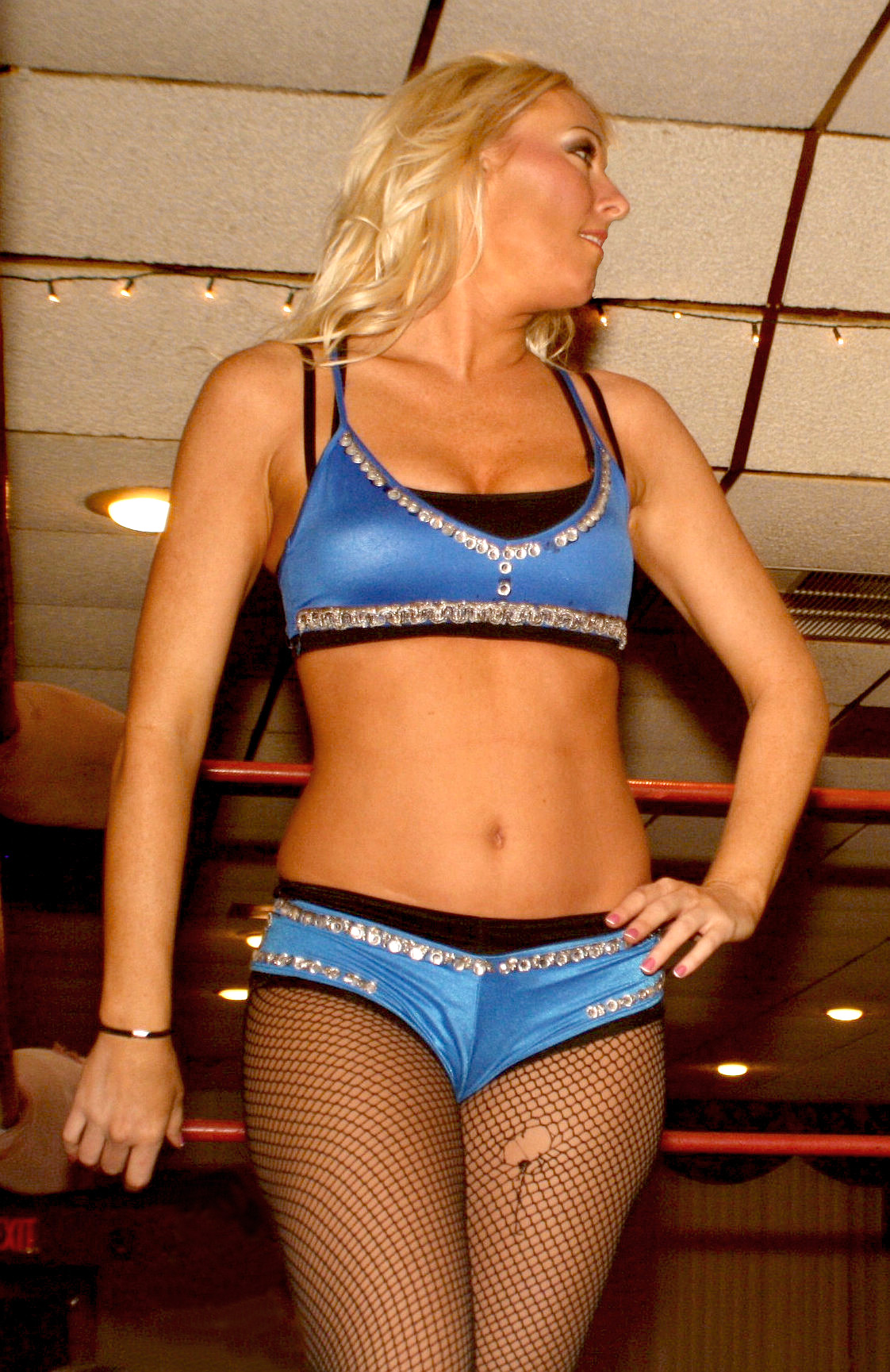
Amber O'Neal set out to form a female division within the company

At Hatchet Attacks, JCW Heavyweight champion Corporal Robinson was assaulted by Breyer Wellington and Butler Jeeves. Vampiro fended off the attack, but informed Robinson that he intended on challenging him for the championship in the future. Though Robinson lost the championship the following month, he regain it by defeating Officer Colt Cabana at Fuck the Police. Following the victory, all of the lights in the arena shut off. When they turned back on, Vampiro appeared in the ring and kicked Robinson in the face. He then posed with the championship belt, and a match was scheduled between Vampiro and the champion.

Amber O'Neal debuted at the event Send in the Clowns, and began insulting the fans, the talent, and the promoters. One of the company's ring girls, Randy, took exception to the comments and challenged O’Neal to a match. Accompanied by her trainer Britney Force, Randy was being easily handled by O'Neal in their match the following week. Seeing that her trainee was in trouble, Force threw in the towel. Though she was offended by the forfeit, Randy accompanied Force in her match against O’Neal at Fuck the Police. As Force was about to gain the pinfall, Randy threw in the towel on Force's behalf. After Randy and Force fought and attacked each other, a triple threat match was made between them and O’Neal at Bloodymania 5.

Managed by Truth Martini, Kongo Kong had established himself as a mighty opponent in the company with a string of dominant victories. He was challenged by Rhino at the event Send in the Clowns, but the two wrestled to a no contest after Martini caused Rhino to inadvertently knock out the referee. Kong attacked Rhino at the two following shows, leading Rhino to fight back at Fuck the Police. A rematch was scheduled between the two at Bloodymania 5. Martini was later removed as Kong's manager in the match after he was injured, per storyline, from a tackle by Rhino.

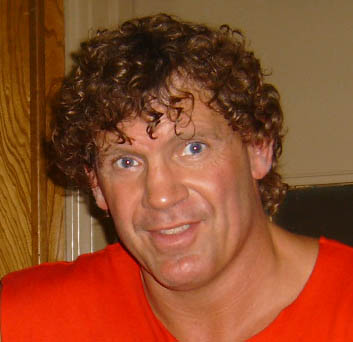
Tracy Smothers teamed with Bull Pain, despite rumors of a relationship between Pain and his daughter Isabella

At Up in Smoke, Ring Rydas defeated JCW Tag Team champions Mad Man Pondo and Necro Butcher to win the championship. After Pondo and Necro won the rights for number one contendership, the duo announced that they would not ask for a match until after their friends Ring Rydas lost the titles. Meanwhile, per storyline, Tracy Smothers was set to be released from prison. He wanted to confront his friend Bull Pain about an alleged relationship with Tracy's daughter Isabella, but Pain persuaded him that the stories were only rumors. The duo formed the tag team Mean Old Bastards and viciously defeated the contenders then the champions in the following weeks. The three teams were then placed in a 4 team tag team match for the championship at Bloodymania 5 that would also include the team of Raven and Sexy Slim Goody.

Butler Jeeves arrived in Juggalo Championship Wrestling as the butler of wrestler Breyer Wellington. Following Wellington's orders, Jeeves aided him in attacking JCW Heavyweight champion Corporal Robinson on numerous occasions. At Up in Smoke, Jeeves won the championship after he was as added to a match that also involved Wellington and the champion. Wellington demanded that Jeeves hand the championship over to him, but Jeeves lost it at Send in the Clowns. A frustrated Wellington blamed Jeeves for his own loss the following week, and then proceeded to attack him before firing him. At the following show, Wellington revealed that he had hired Jeeves’ wife to fulfill all of his needs. Jeeves then challenged Wellington to a match at Bloodymania 5 where the winner would receive the services of his wife.

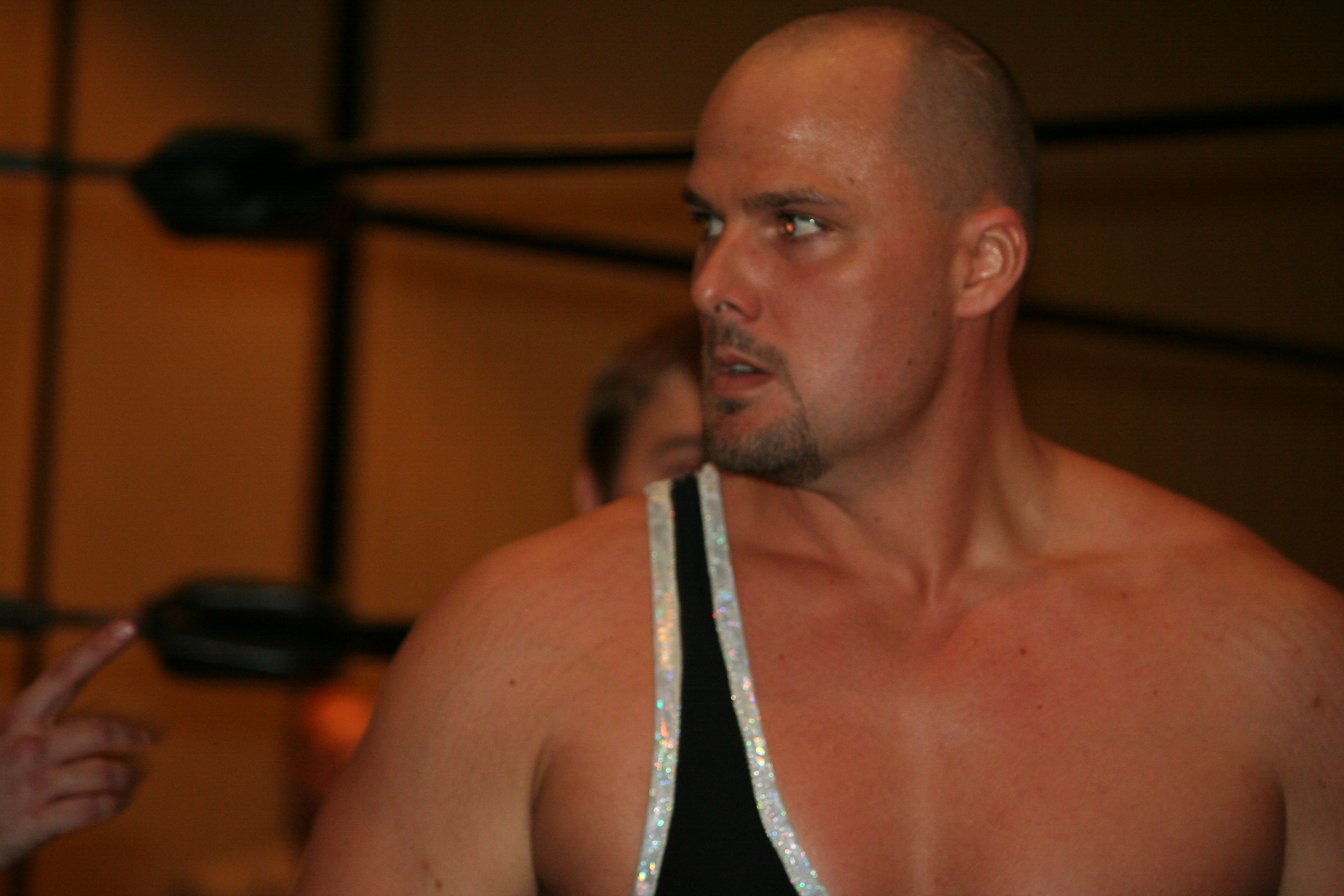
Adam Pearce was brought in to assist Officer Colt Cabana

U-Gene and Zach Gowen formed a tag team at the event Up in Smoke, but the duo lost their first string of matches due to U-Gene's own unintentional doings. At Fuck the Police, they gained their first victory by defeating JCW Tag Team champion Ring Rydas for the championship. However, Gowen forfeited the championship after realizing that U-Gene cheated to win. An enraged U-Gene then attacked Zach Gowen for his decision, disbanding the team and forcing a match between the two at Bloodymania 5.

Due to The Weedman's storyline illegal use of smoking and selling marijuana, Officer Colt Cabana targeted the hero as the first offender to be brought down in an effort to keep order and force respect for the law. At St. Andrews Brawl, Cabana defeated Weedman in a Mask vs. Badge match. He offered Weedman the opportunity to keep his mask by working as his deputy, to which Weedman unwillingly accepted. In the following weeks, Cabana humiliated his deputy by causing him to lose matches and forcing him to wrestle in handcuffs. When Cabana targeted hero 2 Tuff Tony, Weedman defended his friend and instead attacked Cabana. Adam Pearce was brought in by Cabana the following week, and the team was placed in a tag team match against 2 Tuff Tony and a mystery partner at Bloodymania 5.

== Results ==
| No. | Results | Stipulations | Times |
|---|---|---|---|
| 1 | Bill Martel defeated Sal the Man of 1,000 Gimmicks | Singles match | 02:39 |
| 2 | 2 Tuff Tony and The Weedman defeated Officer Colt Cabana and Adam Pearce | Tag team match | 08:11 |
| 3 | Zach Gowen defeated U-Gene via reversed call. | Singles match | 09:29 |
| 4 | Butler Jeeves defeated Breyer Wellington (with Mrs. Jeeves) | Singles match | 06:33 |
| 5 | Raven and Sexy Slim Goody defeated Mean Old Bastards (Tracy Smothers and Bull Pain with Isabella Smothers), Mad Man Pondo and Necro Butcher, and Ring Rydas (Ring Ryda Blue and Red) (c) | Four-team tag team match for the JCW Tag Team Championship | 08:16 |
| 6 | Kongo Kong defeated Rhino | No Disqualification match | 05:13 |
| 7 | Randy the Ring Girl defeated Amber O'Neal and Brittany Force | Triple Threat match | 08:04 |
| 8 | X-Pac defeated Rob Conway and Luke Gallows | Triple Threat match for a contract with the company | 06:18 |
| 9 | Corporal Robinson (c) defeated Vampiro | Singles match for the JCW Heavyweight Championship | 18:57 |
(c) / – the champion(s) heading into the match
