= JCW Legends & Icons =

2011 Juggalo Championship Wrestling event

Legends & Icons
- Logo
- Promotion: Juggalo Championship Wrestling
- Date: August 12, 2011
- City: Cave-In-Rock, Illinois
- Venue: Hogrock Ranch & Campground

Juggalo Championship Wrestling event chronology
← Previous; F**k The Police	Next → Bloodymania V

JCW Legends & Icons was a professional wrestling pay-per-view (PPV) event produced by Juggalo Championship Wrestling (JCW), which was only available online via Psychopathic Live. It took place on May 4, 2011 at Hogrock Ranch & Campground in Cave-In-Rock, Illinois as part of the 2011 Gathering of the Juggalos.

== Background ==
=== Production ===
On the Gathering of the Juggalos infomercial released on June 3, 2011, it was announced that they would hold a show dedicated to the legends of professional wrestling. Initially named "Legends of Wrestling", the show was confirmed to feature wrestlers such as Roddy Piper, Koko B. Ware, the Rock 'n' Roll Express, Bob Orton, Hacksaw Jim Duggan, and Sunny along with many other wrestlers. The show would also feature a steel cage match between Greg Valentine and Tito Santana. More matches would also be announced including Tracy Smothers vs. Tommy Rich, the New World Order (Scott Hall and Kevin Nash vs. the New Age Outlaws (Billy Gunn and Road Dogg) featuring X-Pac as the special guest referee, and a ten-man battle royal rumble match featuring Hacksaw Jim Duggan, Tony Atlas Honky Tonk Man, Carlito, Jimmy Snuka, Viscera, Rob Conway, Zach Gowen, Ronnie Garvin, and U-Gene.

=== Storylines ===
Legends & Icons featured professional wrestling matches that involved different wrestlers from pre-existing scripted feuds, plots, and storylines that were played at Juggalo Championship Wrestling's various events. Wrestlers were portrayed as either a villain or a hero as they followed a series of events that built tension, and culminated into a wrestling match or series of matches. The event featured wrestlers from Juggalo Championship Wrestling's roster.

Other on-screen personnel
Role:	Name:
Disk Jockey	DJ Clay
Commentators	Kevin Gill
Commentators	Mick Foley
Ring announcer	Legz Diamond
Referee	AT Huck
Referee	Drew Taylor
Referee	Rob Tuttle

== Results ==
No.	Results	Stipulations	Times
1^{D}	Joey Owens and One Man Kru defeated Christopher Silvio and Paredyse by pinfall	Tag team match	—
2	Greg Valentine defeated Tito Santana by pinfall	Singles match	3:43
3	Zach Gowen defeated Brutus Beefcake, Carlito, Disco Inferno, Doink The Clown, Head Banger Mosh, Head Banger Thrasher, Jim Duggan, Jimmy Snuka, Rikishi, Rob Conway, Ronnie Garvin, Tony Atlas, U-Gene, and Viscera	15 man Battle royal	28:44
4	The Rock 'n' Roll Express (Ricky Morton and Robert Gibson) defeated The Midnight Express (Bobby Eaton and Dennis Condrey)	Tag team match	0:33
5	Rhino defeated 2 Cold Scorpio, Al Snow, Balls Mahoney, Raven, Sabu, and Shane Douglas by pinfall	Seven way match	3:46
6	Bob Backlund defeated Ken Patera by pinfall	Singles match	6:12
7	Austin Idol defeated Brickhouse Brown, Doug Gilbert, Dutch Mantel, and Koko B. Ware by pinfall	Five way match	2:42
8	Tracy Smothers (with Isabella Smothers) defeated Tommy Rich by pinfall	Singles match	0:36
9	Juggalo World Order (Kevin Nash and X-Pac) (with Scott Hall) defeated The New Age Outlaws (Billy Gunn and Road Dogg) by pinfall	Tag team match with special guest referee Vampiro	6:27
10	Bob Orton and Roddy Piper defeated Mick Foley and Terry Funk by pinfall	Tag team match	4:14
D / – this was a dark match
