= Bloodymania 6 =

2012 Juggalo Championship Wrestling event

- Promotion: Juggalo Championship Wrestling
- Date: August 12, 2012
- City: Cave-In-Rock, Illinois
- Venue: Hogrock Ranch & Campground

Juggalo Championship Wrestling event chronology
← Previous; Oddball Wrestling	Next → Big Ballas X-Mas Party

Bloodymania chronology
← Previous; Bloodymania 5	Next → Bloodymania 7

Bloodymania 6 was a professional wrestling pay-per-view (PPV) event produced by Juggalo Championship Wrestling (JCW), which was only available online via Psychopathic Live. It took place at midnight on August 12, 2012 at the Hogrock Ranch & Campground in Cave-In-Rock, Illinois. Professional wrestling is a type of sports entertainment in which theatrical events are combined with a competitive sport. The buildup to the matches and the scenarios that took place before, during, and after the event, were planned by JCW's script writers. The event starred wrestlers from Juggalo Championship Wrestling's bi-weekly internet wrestling show.

Six matches were held on the event's card. The main event match was a JCW Heavyweight Championship match that featured the champion 2 Tuff Tony defeating Kongo Kong. Featured matches on the undercard included a tag team match where the team of Vader and Scott Steiner defeated Shaun Summers and Roderick Street, a singles match that saw Vampiro defeat Colt Cabana and a nine-man Battle Royal match in which Zach Gowen was victorious.

== Background ==
Bloodymania 6 featured professional wrestling matches that involved different wrestlers from pre-existing scripted feuds, plots, and storylines that were played at Juggalo Championship Wrestling's bi-weekly events. Wrestlers were portrayed as either villains or heroes as they followed a series of events that built tension, and culminated in a wrestling match or series of matches. The event featured wrestlers from Juggalo Championship Wrestling's roster.

== Results ==
No.	Results	Stipulations
1^{D}	The Josh Carey won by eliminating Mosh Pit Mike and Lumberjack Martin	Vampiro's Trainee Battle Royal
2	The Ring Rydas (Ring Ryda Blue and Red) (c) defeated Mad Man Pondo and Necro Butcher, Rock 'n' Roll Express (Ricky Morton and Robert Gibson), and The Headbangers (Mosh and Thrasher)	Four-way tag team match for the JCW Tag Team Championship
3	Vampiro defeated Officer Colt Cabana	Singles match
4	Zach Gowen defeated Carlito, Shockwave the Robot, X-Pac, Bobby Lashley, U-Gene, Chris Masters, Weedman, and The Rude Boy	9 Man Battle Royal
5	John Morrison defeated Matt Hardy (with Reby Sky) and "Richie Boy" Bryer Wellington	Triple Threat match
6	Vader and Scott Steiner defeated Shawn Summers and Roderick Street	Tag team match
7	2 Tuff Tony (c) defeated Kongo Kong	Singles match for the JCW Heavyweight Championship
(c) / – the champion(s) heading into the match; D / – this was a dark match
