= Tempest Release Party Tour =

2007 American concert and wrestling tour

- Tour by Boondox, Wolfpac, Dead By Wednesday, DJ Clay, Juggalo Championship Wrestling
- Associated album: The Tempest
- Start date: February 25, 2007
- End date: March 20, 2007
- Legs: 1
- No. of shows: 21

Tempest Release Party Tour
- Promotion: Juggalo Championship Wrestling
- Date: February 25–March 20, 2007

Juggalo Championship Wrestling event chronology
| ← Previous; Raven's Revenge? | Next → Gathering of the Juggalos |

West Side Wars
- Promotion: Juggalo Championship Wrestling
- Date: March 6, 2007 (aired June 20, 2007)
- City: Long Beach, California
- Venue: The Vault

Juggalo Championship Wrestling event chronology
| ← Previous; Tempest Release Party Tour - Night 9 | Next → Tempest Release Party Tour - Night 10 |

East Side Wars
- Promotion: Juggalo Championship Wrestling
- Date: March 14, 2007 (aired July 28, 2007)
- City: Philadelphia, Pennsylvania
- Venue: Electric Factory

Juggalo Championship Wrestling event chronology
| ← Previous; Tempest Release Party Tour - Night 14 | Next → Tempest Release Party Tour - Night 13 |

The Tempest Release Party Tour was a multi-day concert and professional wrestling tour hosted by the American horrorcore hip-hop duo, the Insane Clown Posse and produced by Psychopathic Records and Juggalo Championship Wrestling (JCW). The tour also featured tapings for JCW's weekly internet professional wrestling show, SlamTV! and was held to promote the release of the Insane Clown Posse's album The Tempest.

== Professional wrestling production ==
Other on-screen personnel
| Role: | Name: |
|---|---|
| Commentators | Violent J (as Diamond Donovan "3D" Douglas) |
| Commentators | Shaggy 2 Dope (as Harley "Gweedo" Guestella) |
| Commentators | Jamie Madrox (as Johnny Stark) |

=== Background ===
Following the release of the first three JCW videos, the company sporadically began referring to itself as Juggalo Championship Wrestling. On July 16, 2007, the company updated its website, changing all references of itself to Juggalo Championship Wrestling. Their logo, however, continued to display the words "Juggalo Championshit Wrestling" until late 2008. In late 2006, the company began a three-month cross-promotional rivalry with Philadelphia-based promotion Pro Wrestling Unplugged. The relationship between the companies continued after the events, as PWU owner Tod Gordon allowed multiple wrestlers to compete for JCW in the Tempest Release Party tour.

Vampiro was originally scheduled to be part of the tour, but was pulled out at the last minute due to SlamTV! being scheduled for a national release on DVD, which would have violated his contract with Wrestling Society X. The tour was taped from February 25-March 20, 2007. A pair of "Free Pay-Per-Views" were also held; the first, named West Side Wars, was held in Long Beach, California, and was aired on June 20, 2007, and the second, called East Side Wars, was held in Philadelphia and aired on July 28 as special episodes of SlamTV!. It also hosted its premier wrestling event at ICP's annual "Gathering of the Juggalos" festival entitled Bloodymania.

=== Storylines ===
The Tempest Release Party Tour featured professional wrestling matches that involves different wrestlers from pre-existing scripted feuds and storylines. Wrestlers portrayed villains, heroes, or less distinguishable characters in scripted events that built tension and culminated in a wrestling match or series of matches. Storylines were produced on Juggalo Championship Wrestling's various events and their weekly internet program SlamTV!.

== Professional wrestling results ==
Night 1 - February 25, 2007
| No. | Results | Stipulations |
|---|---|---|
| 1 | Mad Man Pondo and Necro Butcher defeated The Serial Killers (Jayson Vorheese and Leatherface) by pinfall | Tag team match |
| 2 | Trent Acid defeated Nosawa by pinfall | Singles match |
| 3 | 2 Tuff Tony defeated Zach Gowen by pinfall | Singles match |
| 4 | Tracy Smothers defeated Corporal Robinson (c) by pinfall | Singles match for the PWU Hardcore Championship |
(c) / – the champion(s) heading into the match

Night 2 - February 26, 2007
| No. | Results | Stipulations |
|---|---|---|
| 1 | Mad Man Pondo and Necro Butcher defeated Chris Kole and JT Lightning by pinfall | Tag team match |
| 2 | Trent Acid defeated Nosawa by pinfall | Singles match |
| 3 | 2 Tuff Tony defeated Zach Gowen by pinfall | Singles match |
| 4 | Corporal Robinson (c) defeated Tracy Smothers by pinfall | Singles match for the JCW Heavyweight Championship |
(c) / – the champion(s) heading into the match

Night 3 - February 27, 2007
| No. | Results | Stipulations |
|---|---|---|
| 1 | Mad Man Pondo and Necro Butcher defeated Jimmy Jacobs and Josh Abercrombie by pinfall | Tag team match |
| 2 | Zach Gowen defeated Tracy Smothers (c) by disqualification | Singles match for the PWU Hardcore Championship |
| 3 | 2 Tuff Tony defeated Trent Acid by count out | Singles match |
| 4 | Corporal Robinson (c) defeated Nosawa by pinfall | Singles match for the JCW Heavyweight Championship |
(c) / – the champion(s) heading into the match

Night 4 - February 28, 2007
| No. | Results | Stipulations |
|---|---|---|
| 1 | Nosawa defeated KJ Hellfire by pinfall | Singles match |
| 2 | 2 Tuff Tony defeated Gator McGraw by pinfall | Singles match |
| 3 | Tracy Smothers (c) defeated Zach Gowen by pinfall | Singles match for the PWU Hardcore Championship |
| 4 | Corporal Robinson (c) defeated Mad Man Pondo (with Necro Butcher) by pinfall | Singles match for the JCW Heavyweight Championship |
(c) / – the champion(s) heading into the match

Night 5 - March 1, 2007
| No. | Results | Stipulations |
|---|---|---|
| 1 | 2 Tuff Tony defeated Necro Butcher by disqualification | Singles match |
| 2 | Tracy Smothers (c) defeated Nosawa by knockout | Singles match for the PWU Hardcore Championship |
| 3 | Trent Acid won | JCW Heavyweight Championship #1 contendership battle royal |
| 4 | Corporal Robinson (c) defeated KJ Hellfire by pinfall | Singles match for the JCW Heavyweight Championship |
(c) / – the champion(s) heading into the match

Night 6 - March 2, 2007
| No. | Results | Stipulations |
|---|---|---|
| 1 | The Serial Killers (Jayson Vorheese and Leatherface) defeated KJ Hellfire and Ricky by pinfall | Tag team match |
| 2 | Zach Gowen defeated Tracy Smothers by pinfall | Singles non title match |
| 3 | Trent Acid defeated Nosawa | Singles match |
| 4 | 2 Tuff Tony and Corporal Robinson defeated Mad Man Pondo and Necro Butcher by pinfall | Tag team match |

Night 7 - March 3, 2007
| No. | Results | Stipulations |
|---|---|---|
| 1 | Nosawa defeated Necro Butcher by pinfall | Singles match |
| 2 | Zach Gowen defeated KJ Hellfire by pinfall | Singles non title match |
| 3 | Corporal Robinson (c) defeated Tracy Smothers and Trent Acid | Three way match for the JCW Heavyweight Championship |
| 4 | 2 Tuff Tony defeated Mad Man Pondo by disqualification | Singles match |
(c) / – the champion(s) heading into the match

Night 8 - March 4, 2007
| No. | Results | Stipulations |
|---|---|---|
| 1 | KJ Hellfire vs. Tracy Smothers ended in a no contest | Singles match |
| 2 | Nosawa defeated Mad Man Pondo (with Necro Butcher) | Singles match |
| 3 | Corporal Robinson (c) vs. Trent Acid ended in a no contest | Singles match for the JCW Heavyweight Championship |
| 4 | Zach Gowen defeated Necro Butcher (with Mad Man Pondo) | Singles match |
(c) / – the champion(s) heading into the match

Night 9 - March 5, 2007
| No. | Results | Stipulations |
|---|---|---|
| 1 | Nosawa defeated Necro Butcher (with Mad Man Pondo) by pinfall | Singles match |
| 2 | 2 Tuff Tony defeated Funny Bone by pinfall | Singles match |
| 3 | Trent Acid defeated KJ Hellfire | Singles match |
| 4 | Zach Gowen defeated Mad Man Pondo (with Necro Butcher) by pinfall | Singles match |

West Side Wars - March 6, 2007
| No. | Results | Stipulations |
|---|---|---|
| 1 | Zach Gowen defeated Pogo The Clown by pinfall | Singles match |
| 2 | Human Tornado and Nosawa defeated Mad Man Pondo and Necro Butcher by pinfall | Tag team match |
| 3 | 2 Tuff Tony defeated Kamala by pinfall | Singles match |
| 4 | Trent Acid defeated Corporal Robinson (c) by pinfall | Singles match for the JCW Heavyweight Championship |
(c) / – the champion(s) heading into the match

Night 11 - March 7, 2007
| No. | Results | Stipulations |
|---|---|---|
| 1 | Gator McGraw defeated KJ Hellfire by pinfall | Singles match |
| 2 | 2 Tuff Tony, Corporal Robinson, and Nosawa defeated Hawaiian Lion, K. Nailly, and Mike James by pinfall | Six man tag team match |
| 3 | Human Tornado defeated Necro Butcher by disqualification | Singles match |
| 4 | Zach Gowen defeated Trent Acid by pinfall | Singles non title match |

Night 12 - March 9, 2007
| No. | Results | Stipulations |
|---|---|---|
| 1 | Human Tornado defeated Gator McGraw by pinfall | Singles match |
| 2 | 2 Tuff Tony and Corporal Robinson defeated AWOL and Timmy J by pinfall | Tag team match |
| 3 | Trent Acid (c) defeated Zach Gowen by pinfall | Singles match for the JCW Heavyweight Championship |
| 4 | Mad Man Pondo defeated Necro Butcher | Singles match |
(c) / – the champion(s) heading into the match

Night 12 - March 10, 2007
| No. | Results | Stipulations |
|---|---|---|
| 1 | Human Tornado defeated Shorty Biggs by pinfall | Singles match |
| 2 | Gator McGraw defeated Zach Gowen by pinfall | Singles match |
| 3 | Corporal Robinson defeated Dingo by pinfall | Singles match |
| 4 | Trent Acid defeated 2 Tuff Tony and Mad Man Pondo | Three way match |

East Side Wars - March 14, 2007
| No. | Results | Stipulations |
|---|---|---|
| 1 | Human Tornado and Zach Gowen defeated Drew Blood and Teddy Fine by pinfall | Tag team match |
| 2 | 2 Tuff Tony defeated Samu by pinfall | Singles match |
| 3 | Nosawa and The Great Muta defeated Mad Man Pondo and Necro Butcher by pinfall | Tag team match |
| 4 | Corporal Robinson defeated Trent Acid (c) by pinfall | Singles match for the JCW Heavyweight Championship |
(c) / – the champion(s) heading into the match

Night 17 - March 15, 2007
| No. | Results | Stipulations |
|---|---|---|
| 1 | Human Tornado, Nosawa, and Zach Gowen defeated Derek Frazier, Dr. X, and Ryan McBride by pinfall | Six man tag team match |
| 2 | 2 Tuff Tony defeated Mad Man Pondo by pinfall | Singles match |
| 3 | Bull Pain defeated DJ Hyde by pinfall | Singles match |
| 4 | Corporal Robinson (c) defeated Necro Butcher (c) by pinfall | Singles match for the JCW Heavyweight Championship |
(c) / – the champion(s) heading into the match

Night 19 - March 17, 2007
| No. | Results | Stipulations |
|---|---|---|
| 1 | Mitch Ryder defeated JD Powers by pinfall | Singles match |
| 2 | Zach Gowen defeated Bull Pain by disqualification | Singles match |
| 3 | Nosawa vs. Ron Zombie ended in a no contest | Singles match |
| 4 | 2 Tuff Tony and Corporal Robinson defeated Mad Man Pondo and Necro Butcher by pinfall | Tag team match |

Night 20 - March 19, 2007
| No. | Results | Stipulations |
|---|---|---|
| 1 | Bull Pain defeated Jason Gory by pinfall | Singles match |
| 2 | Bull Pain defeated Zach Gowen by pinfall | Singles match |
| 3 | Mad Man Pondo and Necro Butcher defeated The Family (Jimmy DeMarco and Marshall Gambino) by pinfall | Tag team match |
| 4 | Corporal Robinson (c) vs. Mitch Ryder ended in a time limit draw | 20-minute time limit Singles match for the JCW Heavyweight Championship |
| 5 | 2 Tuff Tony defeated Justin Credible | Singles match |
(c) / – the champion(s) heading into the match

Night 21 - March 20, 2007
| No. | Results | Stipulations |
|---|---|---|
| 1 | Necro Butcher and Zach Gowen defeated Conrad Kennedy III and Joe Doering | Tag team match |
| 2 | Bull Pain defeated JT Lightning by pinfall | Singles match |
| 3 | Mad Man Pondo and Necro Butcher defeated The Bump N Uglies (Bubba MacKenzie and Josh Movado) by pinfall | Tag team match |
| 4 | Nosawa defeated Justin Credible | Singles match |
| 5 | Corporal Robinson (c) defeated Mitch Ryder | Singles match for the JCW Heavyweight Championship |
(c) / – the champion(s) heading into the match

== Performers ==
- Boondox
- Dead By Wednesday
- DJ Clay
- Wolfpac

== Tour dates ==
| Date | City | State | Venue |
|---|---|---|---|
| February 25, 2007 | Cincinnati | Ohio | Bogart's |
| February 26, 2007 | Cleveland | Ohio | Agora Ballroom |
| February 27, 2007 | Grand Rapids | Michigan | The Intersection |
| February 28, 2007 | Minneapolis | Minnesota | First Avenue Club |
| March 1, 2007 | Kansas City | Missouri | Beaumont Club |
| March 2, 2007 | Denver | Colorado | Fillmore Auditorium |
| March 3, 2007 | Magna | Utah | Saltair |
| March 4, 2007 | Reno | Nevada | New Oasis |
| March 5, 2007 | Las Vegas | Nevada | Fort Cheyenne Casino |
| March 6, 2007 | Long Beach | California | The Vault |
| March 7, 2007 | Tempe | Arizona | Marquee Theatre |
| March 9, 2007 | Oklahoma City | Oklahoma | Diamond Ballroom |
| March 10, 2007 | Sauget | Illinois | Pop's Nightclub |
| March 11, 2007 | Columbus | Ohio | Newport Music Hall |
| March 13, 2007 | Fairfax | Virginia | The NorVa |
| March 14, 2007 | Philadelphia | Pennsylvania | Electric Factory |
| March 15, 2007 | Baltimore | Maryland | Rams Head Live |
| March 16, 2007 | Allentown | Pennsylvania | Crocodile Rock |
| March 17, 2007 | Worcester | Massachusetts | Worcester Palladium |
| March 19, 2007 | Millvale | Pennsylvania | Mr. Smalls |
| March 20, 2007 | Detroit | Michigan | St. Andrews Hall |
