= Bloodymania 7 =

2013 Juggalo Championship Wrestling event

- Promotion: Juggalo Championship Wrestling
- Date: August 11, 2013
- City: Cave-In-Rock, Illinois
- Venue: Hogrock Campground

Bloodymania chronology
← Previous; Bloodymania 6	Next → Bloodymania 8

Bloodymania 7 was a professional wrestling supercard event produced by Juggalo Championship Wrestling (JCW). It took place at midnight on August 11, 2013 at Hogrock Campground in Cave-In-Rock, Illinois. Professional wrestling is a type of sports entertainment in which theatrical events are combined with a competitive sport. The buildup to the matches and the scenarios that took place before, during, and after the event, were planned by JCW's script writers. The event starred wrestlers from Juggalo Championship Wrestling.

Six matches were held on the event's card. The main event match was a tag team match featuring 2 Tuff Tony and Vampiro defeating Kongo Kong and The Boogeyman. Featured matches on the undercard included a tag team match where the team of The Ring Rydas defeated Paul London and Brian Kendrick for the JCW Tag Team Championship, a singles match that saw The Rudeboy defeat Necro Butcher from a serious leg injury, and an eight-man Battle Royal match in which Matt Cross was victorious.

== Background ==
Bloodymania 7 featured professional wrestling matches that involved different wrestlers from pre-existing scripted feuds, plots, and storylines that were played at Juggalo Championship Wrestling's bi-weekly events. Wrestlers were portrayed as either villains or heroes as they followed a series of events that built tension, and culminated in a wrestling match or series of matches. The event featured wrestlers from Juggalo Championship Wrestling's roster.

== Results ==
No.	Results	Stipulations
1	Rikishi defeated Breyer Wellington	Singles match
2	The Thomaselli Brothers (Pauly and Vito Thomaselli) defeated The Young Bucks (Matt Jackson and Nick Jackson)	Tag team match
3	Rude Boy defeated Necro Butcher	"Island of Death" No Ropes Lumberjack match
4	Matt Cross defeated Bobby Lashley, Hollywood Chuck Hogan, Jimmy Wang Yang, Kevin Steen, Shane Helms, Nick Dinsmore and Zach Gowen	8-man Battle Royal
5	The Ring Rydas (Ring Ryda Blue and Red) (c) defeated Paul London and Brian Kendrick	Tag team match for the JCW Tag Team Championship
6	2 Tuff Tony and Vampiro defeated Kongo Kong and The Boogeyman	Tag team match
(c) / – the champion(s) heading into the match
