= JCW Tag Team Tournament =

Tag Team Tournament
- Promotion: Juggalo Championship Wrestling
- Date: February 9, 2011
- City: Southgate, Michigan
- Venue: Modern Exchange

Juggalo Championship Wrestling event chronology
← Previous; Cold Winter Fights	Next → Flashlight Hysteria

JCW Tag Team Tournament was a professional wrestling event produced by Juggalo Championship Wrestling (JCW). The event took place on February 9, 2011 at The Modern Exchange in Southgate, Michigan.

== Production ==
=== Storylines ===
JCW Tag Team Tournament featured professional wrestling matches that involves different wrestlers from pre-existing scripted feuds and storylines. Wrestlers portrayed villains, heroes, or less distinguishable characters in scripted events that built tension and culminated in a wrestling match or series of matches. Storylines were produced on Juggalo Championship Wrestling's various events.

=== Aftermath ===
Within a few minutes of the first match, the Southgate Police Department raided the venue which was advertising that "free beer" would be supplied, however, it was reported that underage attendees were being served beer during the event. The following day, JCW issued a press release regarding the raid and announced that tickets to the event would be refunded. JCW continued to host shows at the Modern Exchange until May 18, 2011.

== Results ==
No.	Results	Stipulations
1	2 Tuff Tony and Corporal Robinson defeated Breyer Wellington and Butler Geeves	Tag team match
