= Gathering of the Juggalos 2010 =

2010 music festival organized by the Insane Clown Posse

- Promotional poster
- Date: August 12–15, 2010
- Venue: Hogrock Campground
- Locations: Cave-In-Rock, Illinois, United States
- Previous event: 2009
- Next event: 2011
- Organizer: Psychopathic Records
- Website: juggalogathering.com

The 2010 Gathering of the Juggalos (also known as The Gathering or GOTJ) was a music festival organized by Psychopathic Records, a record label owned by the Detroit-based horrorcore hip-hop duo, the Insane Clown Posse. The festival took place from August 12 to August 15, 2010 at the Hogrock Campground in Cave-In-Rock, Illinois. The festival was also the site for several Juggalo Championship Wrestling events including two Flashlight Wrestling shows, Oddball Wrestling, and Bloodymania IV which were later released on DVD in April 2011.

== Background ==
On March 18, 2010, during an episode of Hatchet Happenings, Psychopathic Records announced that the 2010 Gathering of the Juggalos would take place from August 12, 2010 to August 15, 2010. On April 30, 2010, Insane Clown Posse announced that their film Big Money Rustlas which was set to release on August 17, 2010 would be screened at the festival. On July 21, 2010, Strange Music announced that Brotha Lynch Hung would be performing at the Gathering of the Juggalos.

== Performer lineup ==
The lineup for the 2010 Gathering of the Juggalos featured more than 100 musicians and music groups including Psychopathic Records-signed Anybody Killa, Twiztid, Drive-By, Boondox, Blaze Ya Dead Homie, the Axe Murder Boyz, California-based hip-hop group Above The Law, 1993 MTV Video Music Award-winning rap group Naughty by Nature, rap-rock group the Kottonmouth Kings, Grammy Award-winning rappers Afroman, Vanilla Ice, Warren G, Lil' Kim, and Coolio, Detroit-based rapper King Gordy, and the supergroups Dark Lotus and the Psychopathic Rydas. The festival was headlined by Insane Clown Posse.

=== Main stage ===
Wednesday (August 12)	Thursday (August 13)	Saturday (August 14)	Sunday (August 15)
Claas; V-Sinister; Menace 2 Sobriety; Awesome Dre; Above The Law; Naughty by Nature; Psychopathic Rydas	Dayton Family; Warren G; Boondox; Kottonmouth Kings; Dark Lotus	Axe Murder Boyz; Brotha Lynch Hung; Blaze Ya Dead Homie; Tech N9ne; Twiztid	Spice 1; Rehab; Anybody Killa; Method Man & Redman; Insane Clown Posse

=== Second stage ===
Wednesday (August 12)	Thursday (August 13)	Saturday (August 14)	Sunday (August 15)
Gangs of Green; 17ent; Rhythmic 3; Defekt; Pain; 7th Layer; Smokehouse Junkiez; King Gordy; AJAX; Big B; Afroman	Troubled Mindz; D Murder; Nyland & Dex; Nuttin Nyce; Mizt3r Pruple; Freddy Grimes; Ikkurruz; Trip C; Miss Kisa; LiL V, Ill E. Gal; Ill E. Gal; Tila Tequila; Lil' Kim	Dmize, 614 Villainz, Trackula, Os7, Head Hurtz Monstars, Scum; 614 Villainz; Trackula; Os7; Head Hurtz Monstars; Whitney Peyton; J Reno; Mars; Mastamind; Prozak; Coolio	OushaBoo; Project Assassins; Pimp on Wheels; Loco; Unstable; Rev Fang Gory; Virus; Liquid Assassin

=== Freakshow Tent ===
Wednesday (August 12)	Thursday (August 13)	Saturday (August 14)	Sunday (August 15)
Hatchet House Houseparty feat. the Axe Murder Boyz, DJ Clay, and the Dayton Family	Russett Burbank; Lil Wyte; Critical Bill; Hed PE	Kung Fu Vampire; Blue Felix; Sid Wilson; Vanilla Ice	Psychostick; Villebillies; Wolfpac

== Professional wrestling results ==
Flashlight Wrestling: Legends & Loonies
- Promotion: Juggalo Championship Wrestling
- Date: August 14, 2010
- City: Cave-In-Rock, Illinois
- Venue: Hogrock Campground

Juggalo Championship Wrestling event chronology
← Previous; Happy Daze Tour	Next → Oddball Wrestling

Oddball Wrestling
- Promotion: Juggalo Championship Wrestling
- Date: August 14, 2010
- City: Cave-In-Rock, Illinois
- Venue: Hogrock Campground

Juggalo Championship Wrestling event chronology
← Previous; Flashlight Wrestling: Legends & Loonies	Next → Flashlight Wrestling: Hangin' With Heroes

Flashlight Wrestling: Hangin' With Heroes
- Promotion: Juggalo Championship Wrestling
- Date: August 15, 2010
- City: Cave-In-Rock, Illinois
- Venue: Hogrock Campground

Juggalo Championship Wrestling event chronology
← Previous; Oddball Wrestling	Next → Bloodymania IV

=== Flashlight Wrestling: Legends & Loonies ===
Other on-screen personnel
Role:	Name:
Commentators	Corporal Robinson
Commentators	Violent J

No.	Results	Stipulations	Times
1	The Rock 'n' Roll Express (Ricky Morton and Robert Gibson) and Tommy Rich defeated Kamala and The Haters (Pauly Thomaselli and Vito Thomaselli) by pinfall	Six-man tag team match	4:37
2	Bob Armstrong defeated Bob Orton by pinfall	Singles match	5:19
3	Breyer Wellington (with Butler Geeves) vs. Eugene ended in a no contest	Singles match	—
4	Breyer Wellington and Butler Geeves defeated Brian Christopher and Eugene by pinfall	Tag team match	5:29
5	Tracy Smothers (with Isabella Smothers) defeated Jim Duggan by pinfall	Singles match	5:05
6	PG-13 (JC Ice and Wolfie D) defeated Gangrel and Kevin Thorn (with Truth Martini) by pinfall	Tag team match	11:29

=== Oddball Wrestling ===
No.	Results	Stipulations	Times
1	The Yellow Dog defeated Cousin Eddie, Guido Andretti, Jon Bolen and Justice Jones, Milk Dud, Rusty Goodwrench, and Sal Wilson	Eight-man elimination match	9:37
2	Sabu defeated Officer Colt Cabana	"I Quit" match	7:54
3	Masada defeated Elkview Adam by pinfall	Barbed Wire Madness match	9:06
4	Mad Man Pondo and Necro Butcher defeated Malcom Monroe Jr. and Viper by pinfall	Fans bring the weapons match	10:08
5	Juggalo World Order (2 Tuff Tony and Corporal Robinson) defeated Donnie Peppercricket and Ian Rotten by pinfall	Falls count anywhere tag team Taipei death match	9:03

=== Flashlight Wrestling: Hangin' With Heroes ===
No.	Results	Stipulations
1	Jim Duggan and Ronnie Garvin defeated Bull Pain and Ian Bloody by pinfall	Tag team match
2	Dutch Mantel defeated Doug Gilbert by pinfall	Singles match
3	Kamala and The Weedman (with Johnny Richter) defeated The Haters (Pauly Thomaselli and Vito Thomaselli) by pinfall	Tag team match
4	PG-13 (JC Ice and Wolfie D) defeated Brian Christopher and Disco Inferno by pinfall	Tag team match
5	2 Tuff Tony (with Terry Funk) defeated Balls Mahoney (with Masada) by pinfall	Singles match
6	Corporal Robinson (c) defeated Brian Christopher by pinfall	Singles match for the JCW Heavyweight Championship
(c) / – the champion(s) heading into the match

== Aftermath ==
During the Ladies Night at the festival, reality TV star, former Playboy Magazine model, and singer Tila Tequila suffered several cuts after attendees had reportedly peltered her with objects in her direction including rocks, bottles, and feces. According to professional wrestler Scott Colton, better known by his ring name Colt Cabana, who was a witness to the attack, security pulled Tequila off stage after 15 minutes into her set. In a Twitter post, Tequila stated that "Pretty soon, the owners who run the juggalos will be bankrupt," in response to the attack. According to A.V. Club blogger-author Nathan Rabin who was another witness to the attacks, attendees also had chased Tila to her trailer and proceeded to break the windows of the trailer. On August 18, 2010, CNN reported that Psychopathic Records, the organizers behind the festival, had warned Tequila that it was dangerous for her to take the stage. She also reportedly antagonized the crowd by showing her breasts. Psychopathic Records and the Insane Clown Posse released a statement claiming that "Ms. Tequila was made aware, in advance, of her unpopularity with many Juggalos at the Gathering, but she insisted on performing" and that the group and their record label were not responsible for the incident. Tila also claimed that she would be filing a lawsuit against the Insane Clown Posse and Psychopathic Records but never fell through on it.
