= Eagle Theater (Pontiac, Michigan) =

- U.S. National Register of Historic Places
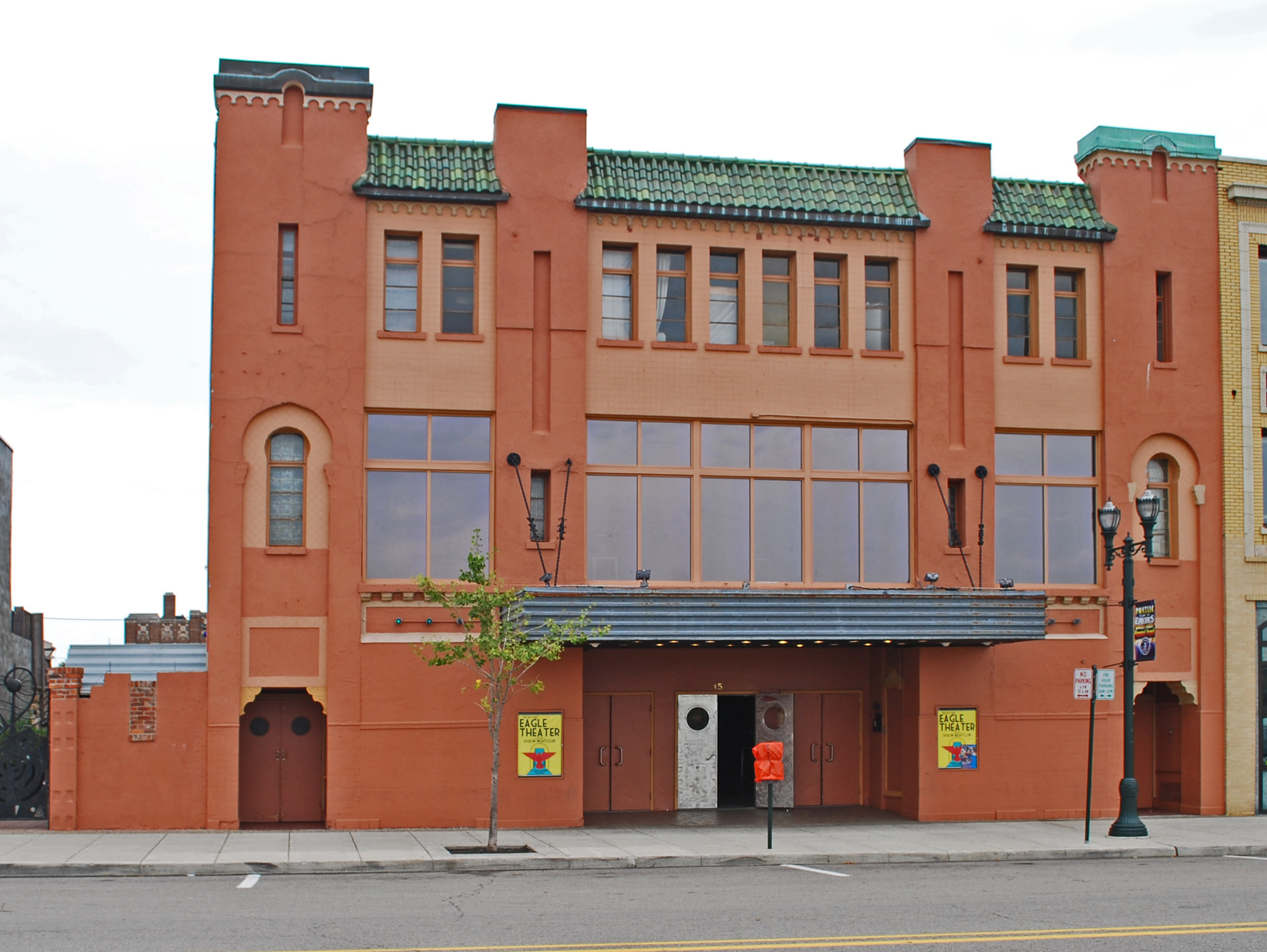
- Interactive map
- Location: 11-15 S. Saginaw St., Pontiac, Michigan
- Coordinates: 42°38′14″N 83°17′32″W
- Area: 0.2 acres (0.081 ha)
- Built: 1927
- Architectural style: Moorish
- NRHP reference No.: 84001810
- Added to NRHP: February 16, 1984

The Eagle Theater is a theater located at 11-15 South Saginaw Street in Pontiac, Michigan. It was listed on the National Register of Historic Places in 1984. It currently houses a nightclub.

== History ==
In the 1860s, a hotel, originally known as the Cooper House Hotel, was constructed on this site. The hotel went through a number of changes of ownership by the beginning of the twentieth century. In 1910, if it was refurbished to become Pontiac's first movie house, the Eagle Theater.

In 1927, this new building was constructed on the site of the old Eagle Theater. After completion, it was leased to W.S. Butterfield Theatres. In the 2000s, the theater was renovated to house a nightclub, and as of 2018, it was the home of Elektricity.

== Description ==
The Eagle Theater is a three-story building with a masonry facade, primarily finished with stucco and red quarry tile. Vertical towers are at each side of the facade, with red quarry tile at the base, Moorish or horseshoe art window treatments at the second floor, and a corbeled cornice at the top. Each interior bay has a decorative mansard roof of clay tile.

On the interior, the theater has many Moorish elements, such as the Moorish arch proscenium and keyhole arches between the columns along the side aisles. The second floor contains a large room where performers and audience traditionally met after the performances, and the third floor contains nine apartments, which were originally intended to house travelling vaudeville performers. The apartments contain Art Deco style bathrooms and Pullman kitchens..

== See also ==
- National Register of Historic Places listings in Oakland County, Michigan
