= The Crofoot =

Mixed-use independent entertainment complex

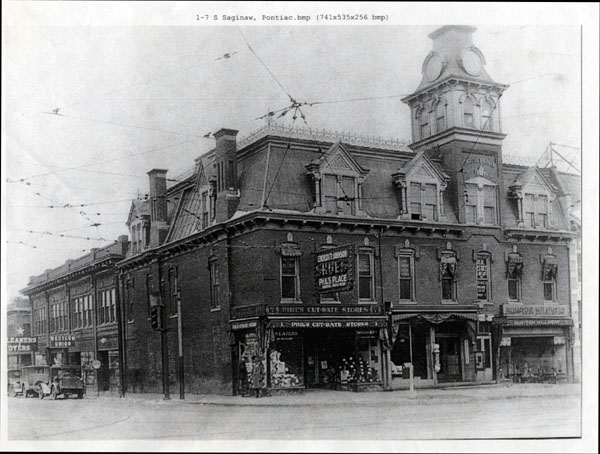
- Crofoot Block 1928
- Interactive map of The Crofoot
- Address: 1 South Saginaw Street
- Location: Pontiac, Michigan
- Coordinates: 42.6366°N 83.2915°W
- Seating type: General Admission
- Capacity: 1100/250/75
- Type: Concert venue/ Live Event Facility

Construction
- Opened: 1830/1882/2007
- Renovated: 2007

Website
- www.thecrofoot.com

The Crofoot is a mixed-use independent entertainment complex made up of 3 venues in one building (The Crofoot Ballroom, The Pike Room, The Vernors Room) in Pontiac, Michigan. The Crofoot is a busy concert venue for popular music acts, and other larger private events or festivals. All-age shows as well as adult-only concerts are held.

== History ==
Pontiac is the first inland city of Michigan. The Pontiac Company plotted it in 1818 where the Saginaw Indian Trail (Woodward Avenue) crossed the Schiawassee Indian Trail (Orchard Lake Road). The Clinton River created double peninsula where it snaked through what would become downtown Pontiac. The Pontiac Commercial Historic District is located just north of where the Saginaw Trail crossed the Clinton River. Historically, the business district of Pontiac was centered at the intersection of Pike and Saginaw.

On April 30, 1840, the entire commercial district on both sides of Saginaw from Pike to Lawrence was leveled in a fire. In response to this event, all new buildings were subsequently built with masonry construction. Between 1840 and the end of the Civil War, many of the buildings along Saginaw were rebuilt.

In the early 1960s the entire area on the South West quadrant of Pike and Saginaw, and much of the historic property to the south of the Clinton River (Water Street), were demolished for urban renewal.

The Crofoot Project survived both the fire and the widespread demolition. The building on the southeast corner of Pike and Saginaw was not burned down, and it was spared demolition in the 1970s. In 1882, it was rebuilt, re-using the existing foundations, floors and some walls.

Michael E. Crofoot, who named the subject property the "Crofoot Block", was a vigorous and active man whose life epitomized the development of Pontiac after its 1818 founding, in the Civil War era, prior to the rapid growth from the expansion of the automobile industry.

Michael E. Crofoot was a prominent businessman, attorney, Judge of Oakland County Probate Court from 1849 to 1856, and a man involved in Oakland County, Michigan and national affairs. He was a delegate to the 1856 Democratic National Convention. After the Civil War, he was selected in 1865 to represent Oakland County in raising subscriptions for the Michigan Soldiers' and Sailors' Monument in downtown Detroit. He lived three blocks up the hill on Williams Street, where his home was one of nine Pontiac landmarks featured on an 1867 "Birds Eye View of Pontiac" by Albert Ruger. In 1871 he was a member of the Pontiac school board. He was on the State Building Commission for the State Asylum in 1874, which was completed in Pontiac in 1878. He represented a defendant in 1882 before the United States Supreme Court. He rebuilt the 1830 era building at Pontiac's first corner in 1882 and named it the "Crofoot Block". He practiced law on the 3rd floor, overlooking from his 10-foot by 10-foot (3.0 m) north-facing window the rapid growth of Pontiac's Downtown Commercial District.

Pontiac's Crofoot School was named after this prominent family, and is still in use today, as a museum to Pontiac's Transportation history.

The Crofoot Project, consisting of three adjacent buildings—the Crofoot Building, the Vernor's Building, and the New Crofoot Block—is a unique contributor to the local Pontiac Commercial Historic District.

The Crofoot Building, located at the crossroads of Pontiac's original 1818 plot, has anchored the Southeast quadrant of Pontiac since 1882. The building's central tower once displayed, in raised masonry letters, the name of its builders, the locally prominent Crofoot family. The Crofoot Building's three 20-foot-wide (6.1 m) bays and two stories of street-level store and second-floor office uses originally formed and still retain the urban pattern of 19th century Pontiac. Facade remodelings and occupant turnovers have little changed this pattern of uses. The Crofoot Building's street level has housed barbers, meat markets, an American Express office, saloons, lunch rooms, shoe stores and millinery shops; while the second floor has housed photographers, land developers, tailors, insurance agencies, and attorneys. The third floor (no longer extant) once housed Judge Michael E. Crofoot's legal offices.

The Crofoot Building is arguably the largest physical survivor of Pontiac's original plat and of its brick nineteenth century architecture. The building has outlasted both of the 1920s expansive remodeling boom and the 1970s demolitions in the name of urban renewal.

The Vernor's Building illustrates another thread in downtown Pontiac's urban formation: the single 20-foot-wide (6.1 m) Victorian facade completely remodeled in the 1920s boom. The Vernor's Building originally shared a similar Victorian facade with the Crofoot Building: open storefronts at street level, a brick second floor pierced by windows, and a third-floor, full-height mansard roof (Photo 3). In 1926, the building was remodeled to house a Vernor's Ginger Ale Soda Fountain; and its distinct brick second-floor was obliterated in a quickening of urban intensity, to form a two-level open storefront (Photo 2 ). Its mansard roof was extant until at least 1935; it was lost sometime after, perhaps when the Crofoot Building lost its third-floor mansard roof and tower. The Vernor's Soda Fountain remained at this address for at least twenty years.

The New Crofoot Block dates not from Victorian downtown Pontiac, but from the expansive automobile-manufacturing Pontiac of the early twentieth century. The New Crofoot Block occupies the rear of Lot 59, the original rear yard of the Crofoot Building, which was earlier occupied by a service barn. By c. 1912, this rear yard had become too valuable for such a use, and a new two-story and basement structure was built, filling the lot. The building's street level had four 17-foot-wide (5.2 m) storefronts facing Pike Street, and the second floor had office space accessible through the original Crofoot Building. The Pontiac City Directory referred to these second-floor offices as "The New Crofoot Block".

The architecture of the new building was a business-like and contemporary, rather than an attempt to emulate its Victorian namesake. The new facade emphasized its large window openings on both floors, surrounding them with a dark cider-colored brick frame, trimmed with limestone, and iced on the top with a pressed-metal entablature.

These three adjacent buildings, despite their different origins, were joined sometime after World War II. Their heights were equalized, their second-floor windows were ruthlessly reset, and their combined street facades were wrapped in a skin of porcelain-metal panels (Photos 6,7), exemplifying another stage in the development of downtown Pontiac.

The Crofoot Project is a unique contributor to the local Pontiac Commercial Historic District because: 1) it is an assemblage of three distinct adjoining buildings that exemplify three threads in the development of the District; 2) the Crofoot Building is unique in its crossroads location, its size, footprint, and date in the District; 3) the three buildings have survived with their footprints intact; 4) the three buildings have retained their historic and urban layering of street-level retail and second-floor office uses; and 5) all three buildings have retained large portions of their historic exterior integrity.

== The Crofoot Today and The Masonic Temple ==
As recently as 2005, the City of Pontiac had condemned this property, and scheduled it for demolition. In 2006 a local developer began the renovation of this important Pontiac landmark. On Sept 7, 2007 the doors to The Crofoot reopened as a new home for music & art in Metro Detroit. The building features a state-of-the-art sound system, and much of the original historical integrity remains. September 24, 2013 The Crofoot presents announced they will be the main promoter for the Detroit Masonic Temple. The Crofoot has played host to countless live events and gatherings, including appearances by Michelle Obama, Bill Cosby, John Waters, and shows from Atticus, Lupe Fiasco, JPEGMAFIA, Twenty One Pilots, Chvrches, Upon A Burning Body, Jimmy Eat World, Deadmau5, The National, Girl Talk, The New Pornographers, Insane Clown Posse Owl City, Sufjan Stevens, Will Oldham, Above and Beyond, Craig Owens, Stars, Paul Van Dyk, Band of Horses, Vampire Weekend, 3OH!3, Bon Iver, King Crimson, Trevor Dunn, St. Vincent, The Avett Brothers, Public Image Ltd., Edward Sharpe and the Magnetic Zeros, EELS, Flyleaf, Lindsey Stirling, Of Mice & Men (band), Sammy Adams, Black Veil Brides, Rodriguez, Cody Simpson, Machine Gun Kelly, Sick Puppies, Motionless in White, Bad Books, We the Kings, Enter Shikari, We Came as Romans, Miss May I, The Wombats, Morning Parade, LCD Soundsystem, The Front Bottoms, Caravan Palace, Dying Fetus, Killswitch Engage and Yuno Miles.
