= Mr. Smalls =

Live music venue in Pennsylvania, U.S.

Coordinates: 40°28′51.2″N 79°58′20.2″W

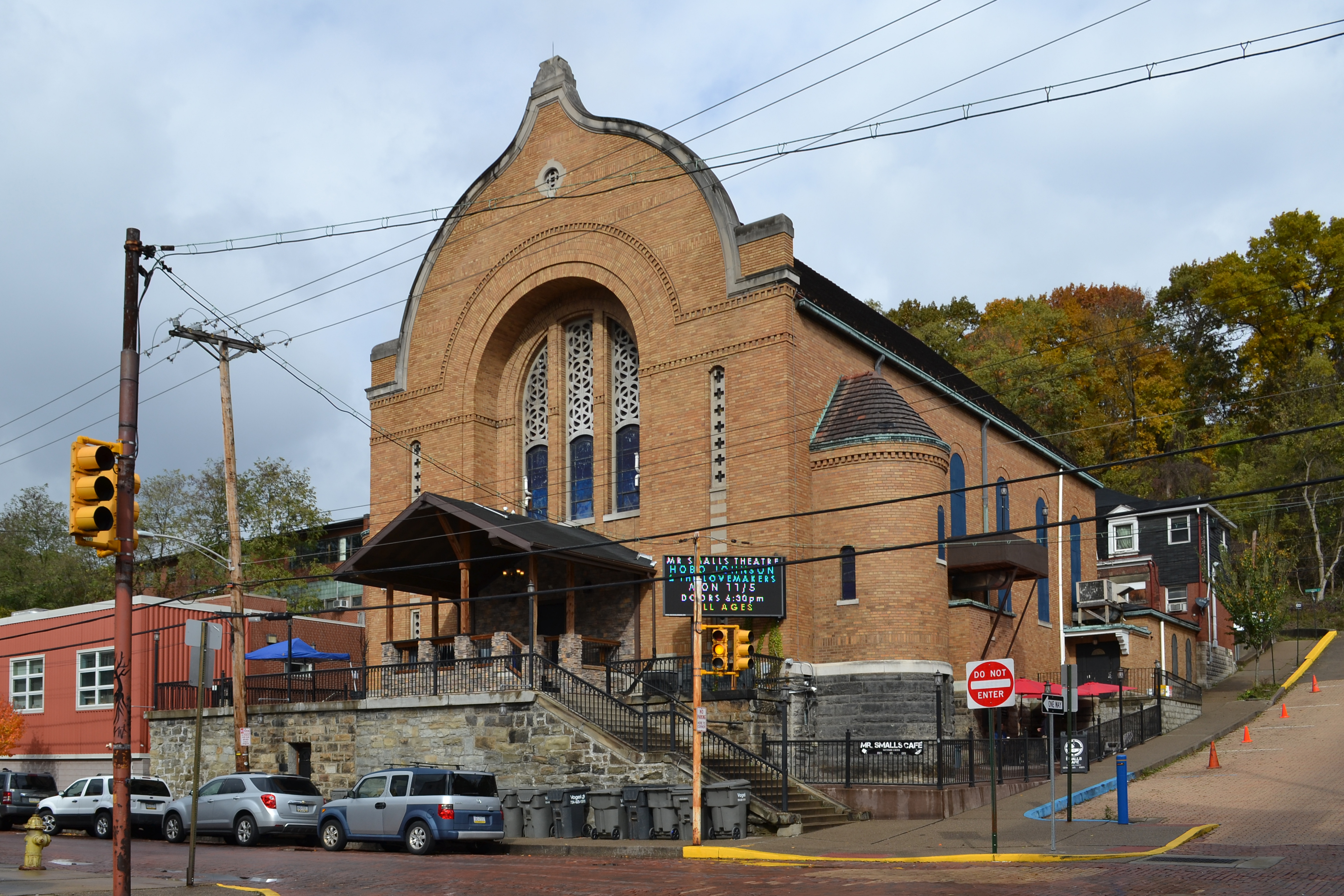
- Mr. Smalls exterior
- Interactive map of Mr. Smalls
- Former names: St. Ann's Catholic Church
- Address: 400 Lincoln Avenue
- Location: Millvale, Pennsylvania 15209 United States
- Owner: Mike Speranzo, Liz Berlin
- Seating type: standing and seating
- Capacity: 1000 (800 in Theatre)
- Type: Live music venue, nightclub, bar
- Event: Music

Construction
- Built: 1924
- Opened: 2002
- Renovated: 2000
- Expanded: 2014
- Architect: Various

Website
- www.mrsmalls.com

Mr. Smalls is a live music venue in Millvale, Pennsylvania, a suburb of Pittsburgh. It is an eclectic and innovative indie venue due to its location in a converted church from the early 20th century, its multiple interior event spaces (including four stages, a recording studio, multiple bars, and a restaurant), and its hosting of thousands of national, regional and local artists since its inception as a venue. Mr. Smalls has been the live music venue for many touring national acts over the years including Fall Out Boy, Bill Clinton, Snoop Dogg, CKY, Muse, Smashing Pumpkins, Bone Thugs N Harmony, Kesha, Interpol, Buckethead and Metric. It has a capacity of over 1,000 people amongst its various interior event spaces, namely the two performance spaces: the Theatre (800 people) and the Funhouse (175 people).

== History ==
Located in Millvale, Pennsylvania, the building in which Mr. Smalls resides once belonged to the Catholic Diocese of Pittsburgh as the site of St. Ann's Catholic Church, which was built in 1924 The building was purchased in 2000 by current owners (and married couple) Mike Speranzo and Liz Berlin. Together, they founded Mr. Smalls in 2002. Speranzo is a musician and former competitive skateboarder, and Berlin is a longtime member of Rusted Root, a worldbeat rock band who attained commercial success in the 1990s. The name of the venue was inspired by the childhood nickname of their son, Jordan.

When it was purchased, the building underwent extensive renovations in order to convert it to its new use as a music venue, recording studio and skate park. In addition to those functions, Creative.Life.Support offers services such as artist career development and professional opportunities in conjunction with the venue. Over the years, the venue has grown and evolved to accommodate its audience and demands. It has become one of the only venues in the area that can house large national acts as well as small ones. Professional skateboarder Evan Smith references Mr. Smalls as a venue that had a major influence on the development of his skating and music. Mr. Smalls is an independent venue, event space and recording studio to this day, and is known for supporting the careers of many talented artists and bands.

== Interior layout and rooms ==
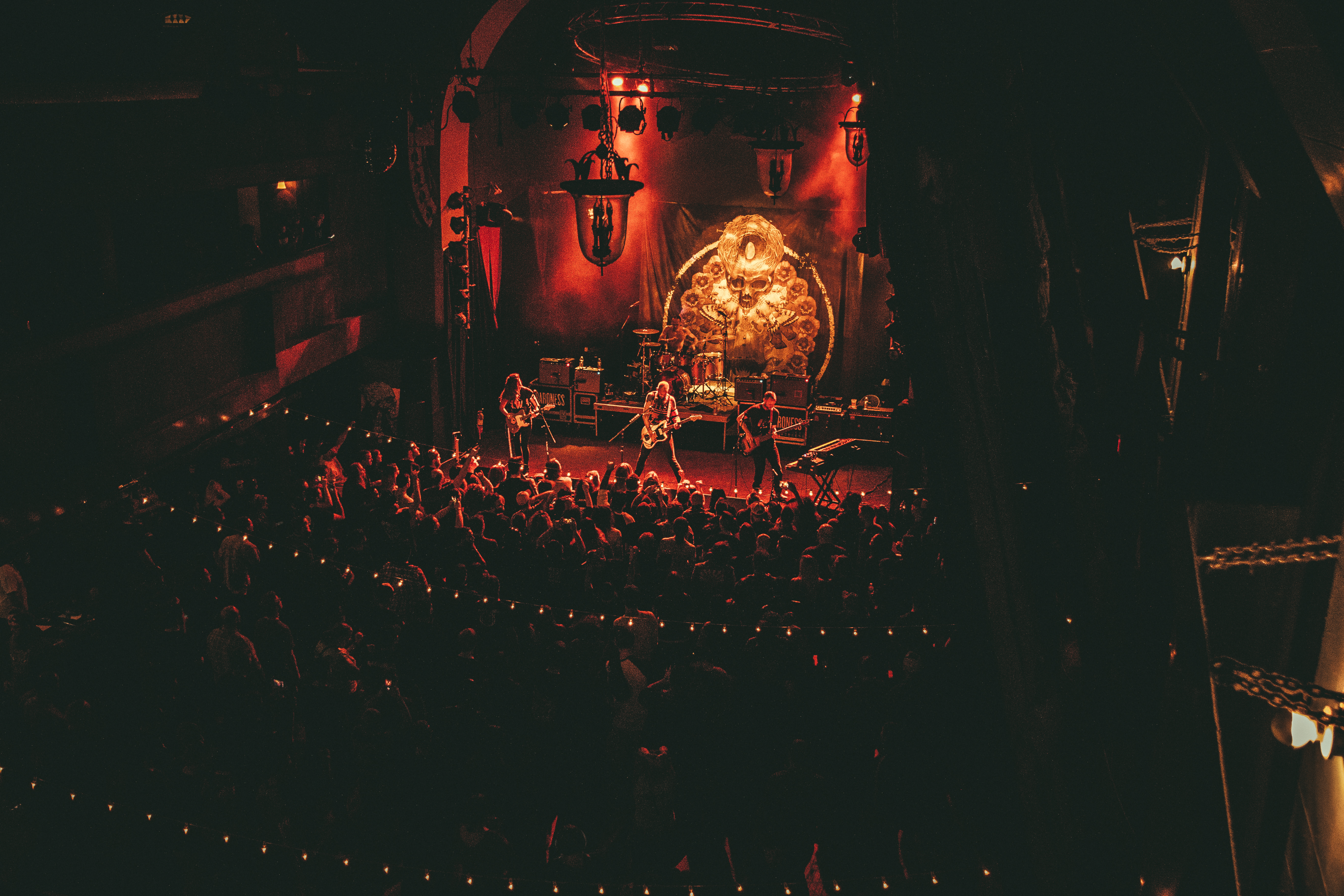
Baroness performs at Mr. Smalls Theatre Stage

Inside the building, there are many spaces each serving various functions:

- The Theatre Stage is a large performance space with a capacity of 800 people. For the Theatre Stage audience, there is a main floor viewing area (standing room) and two bars, plus the VIP Balcony section. The Theatre Stage space was the former church's main congregation room. The 40 foot ceilings and many windows of the former church have been fixed with custom coverings and acoustic sound paneling.
- The Funhouse Stage is a smaller performance space, opened April 2016, with a capacity of 200 people.
- The Funhouse Restaurant is open during shows which take place on the Theatre Stage and the Funhouse Stage.
- The Skatepark was a large part of the venue's early years, but has since been closed. Its materials were repurposed in the building of the Funhouse.
- The Great Hall connects the Funhouse Restaurant and Theatre Balcony and has seating and a bar.
- The Courtyard is a multi-level outdoor area with a stage. The Courtyard can accommodate bands or DJs.
- The Recording Studio was formerly located in the same building as the rest of Mr. Smalls, but is currently located in another neighborhood of the city, the North Side.
- The Café is a full bar and coffee shop in the basement of Mr. Smalls. It is used for pre-show, mid-show and post-show gatherings.
- The Sanctuary Stage is located in a former Methodist church across the street from Mr. Smalls. It houses the Creative.Life.Support Center, and serves as an additional stage, as well as a restaurant, coffee shop and music equipment trade shop. The Sanctuary Stage has a capacity of 400. It was built in the early 1900s.

== Notable acts ==
Notable acts who have performed at Mr. Smalls include the following artists and speakers:

- Arctic Monkeys
- Buckethead
- Baroness
- Ziggy Marley
- Los Lobos
- Todd Snider
- Wiz Khalifa
- Ashley McBryde
- Bowling For Soup
- Less Than Jake
- Sleeping With Sirens
- Pierce The Veil
- Tonight Alive
- All That Remains
- Tally Hall
- Rusted Root
- Caroline Polachek
- Caught on Sight
- Desolence
- Avenged Sevenfold
- Mushroomhead
- GZA
- Reign Of Z
- Psychostick
- Affiance
