= Zach Gowen =

American professional wrestler (born 1983)

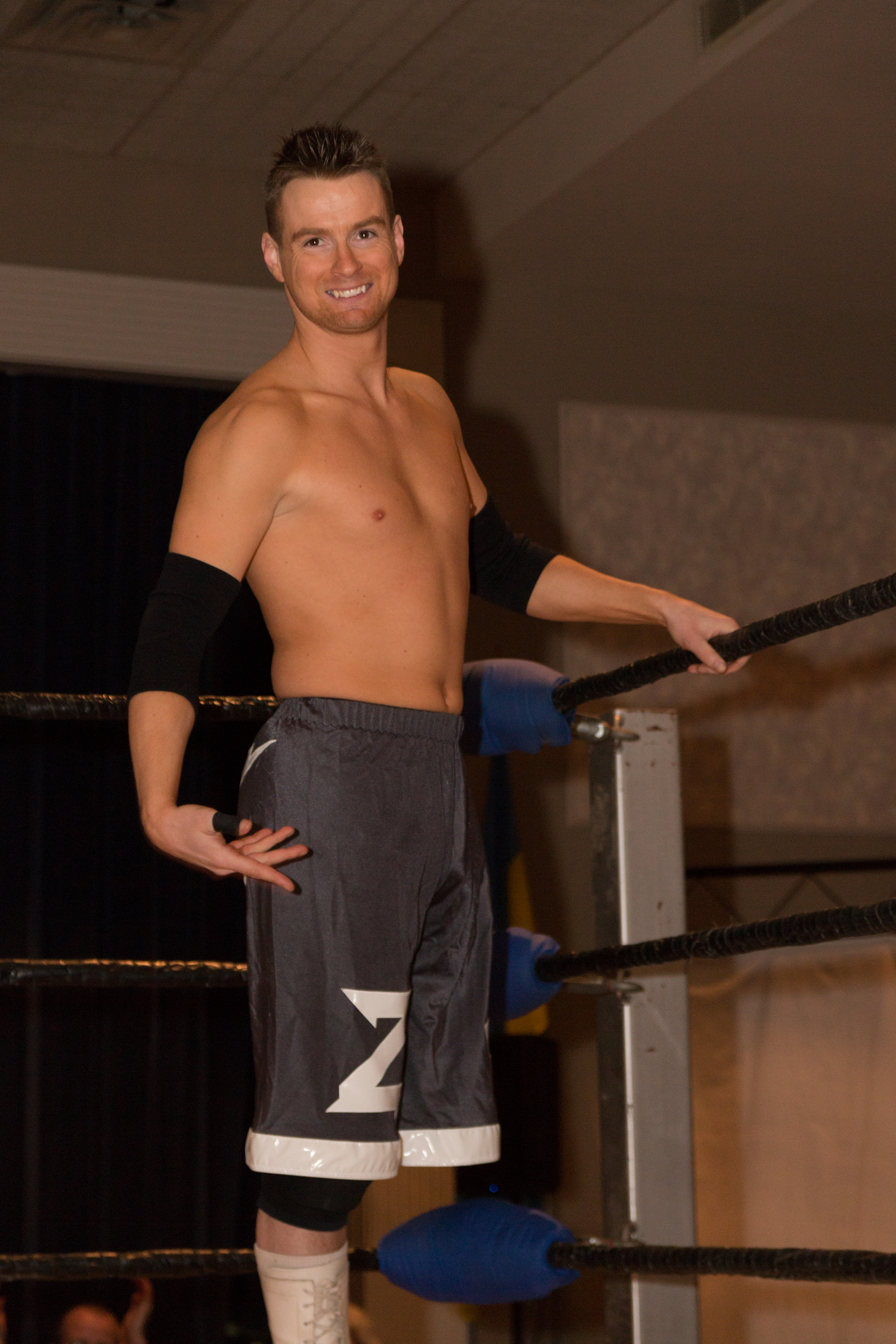
- Gowen in 2014

Personal information
- Born: Zachary Mark Gowen; March 30, 1983 (age 43) Ypsilanti, Michigan, U.S.
- Children: 4

Professional wrestling career
- Ring name(s): Pogo the 1 Legged Boy; Tenacious Z Zach Gowen
- Billed height: 5 ft 11 in (180 cm)
- Billed weight: 155 lb (70 kg)
- Billed from: Detroit, Michigan
- Trained by: Tommy Johnson; Truth Martini
- Debut: March 16, 2002
- Retired: October 15, 2026

Zachary Mark Gowen (born March 30, 1983) is an American retired professional wrestler and promoter. He is primarily known for his time with WWE from 2003 to 2004 and with other promotions such as Total Nonstop Action Wrestling (TNA), Ring of Honor (ROH) and Xtreme Intense Championship Wrestling (XICW).

Gowen's left leg was amputated when he was eight years old. He was the second amputee to compete in WWE after Kerry Von Erich.

== Early life ==
Gowen was diagnosed with cancer as a child, and lost his left leg due to amputation at the age of eight. He was a fan of professional wrestling from a young age, and cites Shawn Michaels and Rey Mysterio as two of his favorite wrestlers.

Gowen is an alumnus at Churchill High School in Livonia, Michigan, Class of 2001.

== Professional wrestling career ==
=== Early career (2002) ===
After being trained by Truth Martini, Gowen made his professional wrestling debut on March 16, 2002, in a loss to Martini. While training Gowen made the decision to wrestle without his prosthetic leg as he found it difficult to wrestle with the "dead weight".

=== Total Nonstop Action Wrestling (2003, 2005, 2006) ===
Gowen first gained national exposure wrestling for Total Nonstop Action Wrestling during early 2003 under the name Tenacious Z. On the January 29 NWA-TNA PPV, Tenacious Z defeated Truth Martini in a dark match. On the February 5 NWA-TNA PPV, Tenacious Z defeated B.G. James. On the February 12 NWA-TNA PPV, Tenacious Z, Ron Killings and Jorge Estrada defeated B.G. James, Glenn Gilbertti and Mike Sanders. Afterwards Gowen left TNA, opting not to sign an official contract on the advice of Martini, who advised him WWE were likely to offer him a contract. In February 2003, Gowan signed a development contract with World Wrestling Entertainment (WWE).

Gowen later returned to TNA on May 15, 2005, at their Hard Justice pay-per-view event, as the second entrant in the 20-Man Gauntlet for the Gold match. He lasted just under five minutes in the ring before being eliminated by Shark Boy. The next month, Gowen wrestled at the Slammiversary pay-per-view, losing in a six-way match. He also appeared on TNA Impact!, wrestling Mikey Batts to a no contest before leaving the promotion once again later that year. In October 2006, at Bound for Glory, Gowen returned to TNA during the Kevin Nash X-Division Open Battle Royal Gauntlet match as the sixth entrant, but was eliminated by Johnny Devine.

=== WWE (2003–2004) ===
He made his World Wrestling Entertainment debut on the May 15, 2003 episode of SmackDown! as a planted fan in the audience, who attempted to help Mr. America when he was being attacked by Roddy Piper and Sean O'Haire. During the segment, Piper pulled off Gowen's prosthetic leg. This began a short collaboration of Gowen and Mr. America, and a feud pitting the two against Roddy Piper and Sean O'Haire. This storyline culminated at the Judgment Day pay-per-view on May 18 when Mr. America, accompanied by Gowen, defeated Piper, who was accompanied by O'Haire.

Gowen's partnership with Mr. America put him on bad terms with Mr. McMahon, as McMahon was convinced Mr. America was Hulk Hogan in disguise. On the June 26 episode of SmackDown!, McMahon told Gowen that if he would join his "Kiss My Ass Club", he would be awarded a WWE contract. Instead Gowen attacked McMahon. As a result, Gowen and Stephanie McMahon were put in a match against Big Show on the July 3 episode of SmackDown!, in what McMahon billed as the first "real" handicap match (referring to Gowen and his amputee status in addition to the two vs. one parameters of the match). With help from both Kurt Angle and Brock Lesnar, Gowen and Stephanie McMahon defeated Big Show, winning Gowen a contract. Gowen's win further fueled the ill-feelings toward him from Mr. McMahon. This feud culminated in a one-on-one match between the two at Vengeance on July 27 in which McMahon defeated Gowen.

Gowen then lost several singles matches to wrestlers including Shannon Moore, Nunzio, and John Cena, with Gowen being attacked by Matt Hardy, Moore's mentor, following each loss. The storyline was cut short on the August 21 episode of SmackDown!, when Gowen defeated Brock Lesnar by disqualification after Lesnar broke Gowen's leg in storyline.

Gowen was absent from television for nearly a month, returning in an interview on the October 2 episode of SmackDown! promoting his in-ring return for the following week. In his in-ring return, Gowen lost to Moore following interference from Hardy, reigniting their feud. As a result, Gowen and Hardy faced off in a singles match at No Mercy on October 19, which Gowen won. On the October 23 episode of SmackDown!, Gowen lost to Tajiri in a singles match, and afterward was attacked by two of Tajiri's associates. Gowen did not return to WWE television due to suffering an injury, and was later released from his WWE contract on February 4, 2004.

=== Independent circuit (2004–2026) ===
Following his release from WWE, Gowen decided to focus on his education and work limited professional wrestling dates. He appeared for several independent promotions, including Independent Wrestling Association Mid-South (IWA Mid-South) where he played the character of an egotistical heel (villain). Gowen was part of the Jeff Peterson Memorial Cup in 2004.

In All American Wrestling, he was also a part of the "Michigan Invasion" heel stable (along with fellow Michigan wrestlers Truth Martini, "Amazing" N8 Mattson, Eddie Venom and Brian Gorie). On April 14, 2007, Gowen and his mystery partner Krotch defeated "Michigan Invasion" members Truth Martini and "Amazing" N8 Mattson to become new AAW Tag Team Champions. They then lost the championship to Trik Davis and Conrad Kennedy III in a four-way elimination match on June 16, 2007.

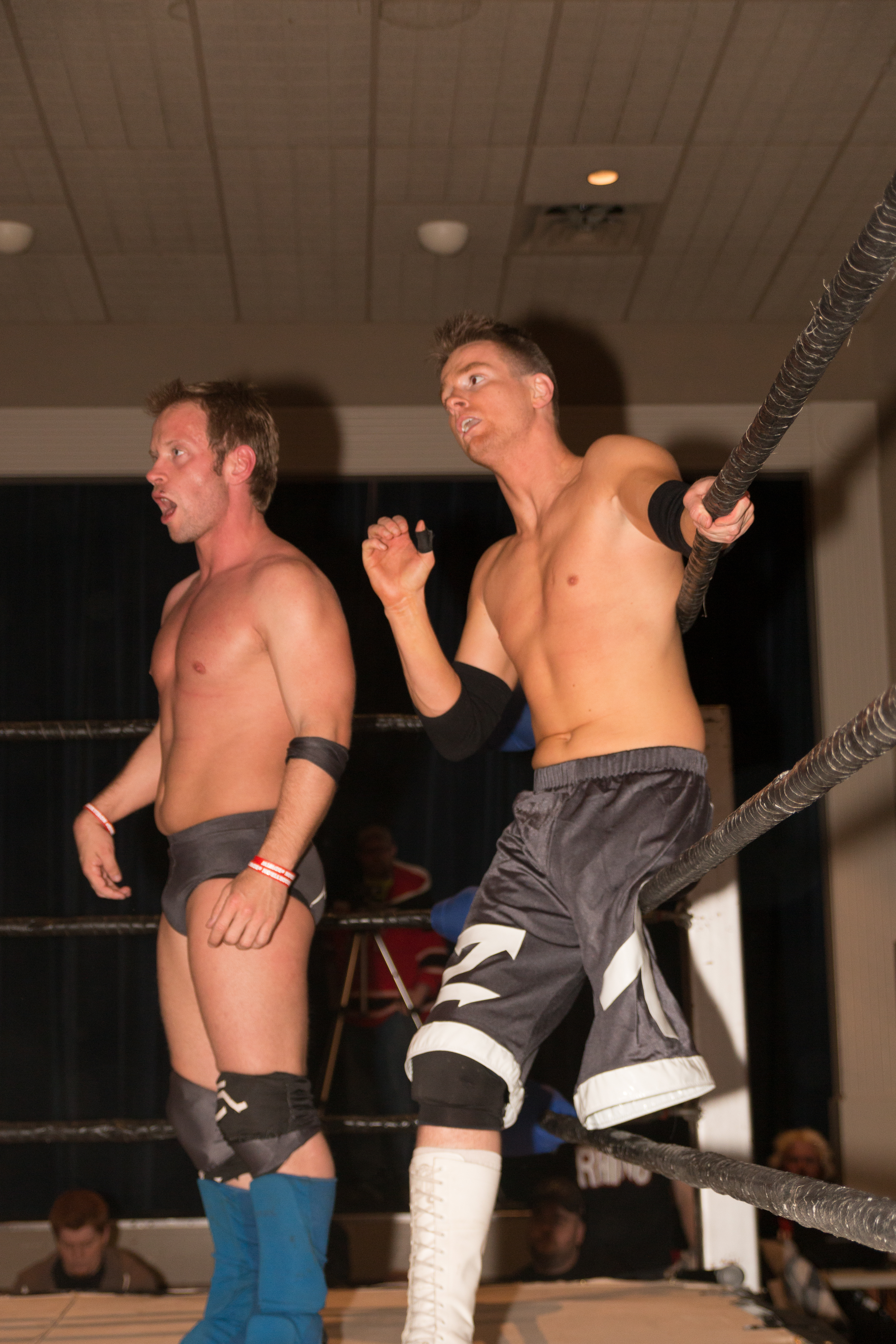
The Handicapped Heroes - Gregory Iron (left) and Gowen - at an independent show in April 2014

In a circus-based independent wrestling promotion, Squared Circle Revue, Gowen portrayed a one-legged boy, under the ring name, Pogo The 1 Legged Boy.

In Prime Wrestling, Gowen formed a tag team with Gregory Iron known as "The Handicapped Handguns". The duo defeated The Dead Wrestling Society in January 2013 to become the Prime Tag Team Champions. They held the championship for three months, until losing it to Marion Fontaine and Jeremy Madrox on April 19. As the "Handicapped Heroes", Gowen and Iron also won the Clash Tag Team Championship on April 27. On October 20, 2013, The Handicapped Heroes regained the Prime Tag Team Championship.

Gowen made his Ring of Honor (ROH) debut on October 7, 2006, losing to Delirious in a singles match. Gowen would later return to ROH on February 22, 2008, in Deer Park, New York, immediately aligning himself with The Age of the Fall. On November 12, 2010, he appeared at an ROH show in Detroit, where he was announced as the newest member of Truth Martini's House of Truth faction. He teamed with ROH World Champion Roderick Strong and Michael Elgin in a loss to the Briscoe Brothers and Christopher Daniels. After a tag team loss to Grizzly Redwood and Bobby Dempsey at the following day's event in Toronto, Elgin and Martini turned on Gowen and kicked him out of the House of Truth.

On September 26, 2026 at WrestleRave's King Of The Mountain, Gowen wrestled his final match in a loss to KC Kr'eme. On October 14, 2026, Gowen announced his retirement from professional wrestling.

=== All Elite Wrestling (2025) ===
Gowen made his All Elite Wrestling (AEW) debut on the May 8, 2025 episode of Collision as an audience member. During the show, he would be attacked by Ricochet, who proceeded to steal his prosthetic leg. On May 14 at Dynamite: Beach Break, Gowen was defeated by Ricochet.

== Personal life ==
Gowen attended Eastern Michigan University, where he studied Secondary Education and Mathematics. He has four children with his wife.

In 2016, Gowen competed in the Indianapolis qualifying round of the eighth season of American Ninja Warrior. He fell on the third obstacle, the fly wheels, and did not move on to the city finals.

Gowen released a memoir, High Risk Maneuvers, in 2018 and currently tours as a motivational speaker for kids.

In August 2023, He delivered a presentation titled "Don't Quit Your Daydream" at Western Nevada College. During this event, he recounted overcoming significant life obstacles, emphasizing the importance of perseverance and self-belief.

== Championships and accomplishments ==
- 3XWrestling
  - 3XW Heavyweight Championship (1 time)
- All American Wrestling
  - AAW Tag Team Championship (1 time) – with Krotch
- Blue Water Championship Wrestling
  - BWCW Heavyweight Championship (1 time)
- CLASH Wrestling
  - CLASH Tag Team Championship (1 time) – with Gregory Iron
- Cleveland All-Pro Wrestling
  - CAPW Junior Heavyweight Championship (1 time)
- Cleveland Wrestling Alliance
  - CWA Latino Velez Memorial Championship (1 time)
- Independent Wrestling Revolution
  - IWR King of the Indies Championship (1 time)
  - IWR Tag Team Championships (1 time) - with Kamikaze
- Michigan Championship Wrestling Association
  - MCWA Heavyweight Championship (1 time)
- Mid American Wrestling
  - MAW Tag Team Championships (1 time) - with Silas Young
- Mr. Chainsaw Productions Wrestling
  - MCPW Tag Team Championship (1 time) – with Gregory Iron
- Prime Wrestling
  - Prime Tag Team Championship (2 times) – with Gregory Iron
- Pro Wrestling All-Stars Of Detroit
  - PWASD Downriver Championship (1 time)
  - PWASD Tag Team Championship (1 time) – with Gregory Iron
- Pro Wrestling Illustrated
  - PWI Most Inspirational Wrestler of the Year (2003)
  - PWI Rookie of the Year (2003)
- Pro Wrestling Syndicate
  - PWS Tag Team Championship (1 time) – with Gregory Iron
- Pure Pro Wrestling
  - PPW Michigan State Heavyweight Championship (1 time)
- Twin Wrestling Entertainment
  - Nacho Cup (2006)
- Xtreme Intense Championship Wrestling
  - XICW Light Heavyweight Championship (3 times)
  - XICW Xtreme Intense Championship (1 time)
  - XICW Tag Team Championship (1 time) – with Jaimy Coxxx
