= Hogrock Ranch & Campground =

Campground and music venue located in Cave-In-Rock, Illinois

- Interactive map of Hogrock Ranch & Campground
- Former names: Hog Rock Event Center
- Address: 53 Edmonson Landing
- Location: Cave-In-Rock, Illinois
- Coordinates: 37°32′0.42036″N 88°5′47.14764″W
- Owner: Tim York
- Seating type: lawn
- Capacity: 8,000–10,000
- Type: Campground; Amphitheatre

Construction
- Opened: 1996

Website
- www.hogrock.com

The Hogrock Ranch & Campground, also known as the Hogrock Campgrounds, Hogrock, and formerly known as the Hog Rock Event Center, is an outdoor concert venue and campground located in Cave-In-Rock, Illinois.

During the Hogrock River Rally held on June 15, 2009, a driver had struck six motorcyclists, killing two of them and injuring four of them in an accident. Danny Gaddis, the driver of the pickup truck that struck the motorcyclists, was arrested for failure to lower his speed.

The venue has hosted many music festivals and concerts since 1996. From 2007 to 2013, Hogrock was the site of the annual Gathering of the Juggalos organized by Insane Clown Posse's Psychopathic Records. From 2015 to 2024, the venue was the host of Full Terror Assault, an open-air music festival organized by Shane Bottens.

== List of past events ==
- Gathering of the Juggalos – August 9–12, 2007, August 7–10, 2008, August 6–9, 2009, August 12–15, 2010, August 11–14, 2011, August 8–12, 2012, August 7–11, 2013
- Hogrock River Rally – 1996, 1997, 1998, 1999, 2000, 2001, 2002, 2003, 2004, 2005, 2006, 2007, 2008, 2009, 2010, 2011, 2012, 2013, 2014, 2015, 2016, 2017, 2018, 2019, 2021, 2022, 2023, 2024, 2025
- Full Terror Assault – September 10–12, 2015, August 25–27, 2016, September 7–9, 2017, September 6–8, 2018, September 4–7, 2019, September 8–11, 2021, September 7–10, 2022, September 6–9, 2023, September 4–7, 2024

== Upcoming events ==
- Hogrock Adventure Rally – June 25–28, 2026
- Hogdaddy's Fam-ily Reunion – September 23–27, 2026
