= Professional wrestling career of Insane Clown Posse =

Professional wrestling tag team

Insane Clown Posse

Tag team
- Members: Violent J Shaggy 2 Dope
- Billed heights: 6 ft 3 in (1.91 m) – Violent J 6 ft 2 in (1.88 m) – Shaggy 2 Dope
- Combined billed weight: 486 lb (220 kg; 34.7 st)
- Hometown: Detroit, Michigan
- Debut: December 18, 1997
- Years active: 1997–2002; 2004–2007; 2009
- Trained by: Self-Trained; Al Costello; Denny Kass

Insane Clown Posse (also known as ICP) is a professional wrestling tag team who have competed in Juggalo Championship Wrestling (JCW) that consists of Violent J and Shaggy 2 Dope. Both members began wrestling as single competitors in 1983 in their backyard wrestling promotion Tag Team Wrestling, later renamed National All-Star Wrestling.

The two later competed in various independent promotions in Michigan from 1990 to 1997 before making an appearance in Extreme Championship Wrestling (ECW) as Insane Clown Posse. The team later wrestled for World Wrestling Federation (WWF) with The Oddities, World Championship Wrestling (WCW) with The Dead Pool and The Dark Carnival, NWA Total Nonstop Action, and Juggalo Championship Wrestling. Insane Clown Posse are two-time JCW Tag Team Champions. Bruce is a one-time JCW Tag Team Champion with 2 Tuff Tony, and Utsler is a one-time JCW Heavyweight Champion. Bruce and Utsler are founding members of the Juggalo World Order.

== History ==
=== Extreme Championship Wrestling (1997) ===
In August 1997, Bruce received a telephone call from friends Rob Van Dam and Sabu. They asked if he and Utsler could appear on Extreme Championship Wrestling (ECW)'s second pay-per-view (PPV) program, Hardcore Heaven. Bruce and Utsler were already fans of ECW, as Van Dam had been sending videotapes of the show to them since its first airing. They agreed to appear and went to Florida to discuss the ECW program's content with Van Dam, Sabu, and Paul Heyman. Heyman was pleased that Bruce and Utsler were former wrestlers, which meant that they could surprise the crowd by taking bumps. Heyman also favored the idea of using Insane Clown Posse, because it was unlikely that anyone knew of the relationship the group had with Van Dam and Sabu. Heyman presented his idea to Bruce and Utsler, who agreed to participate. Insane Clown Posse opened the ECW program by performing songs and exciting the crowd. Then Van Dam and Sabu, the main villains at the time, attacked Bruce and Utsler. The top fan favorite, The Sandman, came in and saved them by chasing away Van Dam and Sabu with his signature Singapore cane.

=== ICP's Strangle-Mania Live (1997) ===
Being avid wrestling fans, Bruce and Utsler owned, and were fascinated by, the death match wrestling collection Outrageously Violent Wrestling from Japan. The duo decided to create a compilation of their favorite matches, recording their own commentary under the personas of "Handsome" Harley Guestella a.k.a. 'Gweedo' (Utsler) and Diamond Donovan Douglas a.k.a. '3D' (Bruce). The compilation video was released nationwide under the title ICP's Strangle-Mania. The video's success allowed Bruce and Utsler to host their own wrestling show, ICP's Strangle-Mania Live, to a sold-out performance at St. Andrew's Hall. The main event featured Insane Clown Posse versus The Chicken Boys, who were played by two friends of Bruce and Utsler. With local wrestling booker Dan Curtis, other wrestlers such as Mad Man Pondo, 2 Tuff Tony, Corporal Robinson, King Kong Bundy, and Abdullah the Butcher were also booked on the show to wrestle in the same death match style seen in Strangle-Mania.

=== World Wrestling Federation (1998) ===
In the summer of 1998, Insane Clown Posse received a telephone call from Jim Johnston of the World Wrestling Federation (WWF). The WWF heard that Bruce and Utsler were fans of wrestling and asked them to perform the entrance theme for the wrestling group Oddities. The WWF also wanted Bruce and Utsler to appear on their SummerSlam pay-per-view (PPV) program in August 1998 and rap live while The Oddities entered the ring. Insane Clown Posse composed the song "The Greatest Show" and agreed to appear on the program. Once the duo arrived at the arena, they realized their wrestling dreams had come true; they had been contacted by wrestling's top company and were now set to appear on their PPV program at the company's most historic venue, Madison Square Garden. Bruce and Utsler met backstage with various wrestlers, including the owner of the WWF, Vince McMahon, and his son, Shane McMahon. Bruce and Utsler paid Mick Foley, a wrestler with the WWF, his royalty payments from the ICP Strangle-Mania DVD, as Foley appeared in almost every match, and a friendship began among the three. Bruce and Utsler were assigned to the locker room with Stone Cold Steve Austin and The Undertaker, who were to wrestle during the main event that night. The duo immediately felt the animosity of the locker room that had previously driven them away from wrestling. Insane Clown Posse performed and were asked to return on September 1, 1998 for a television taping, where they accompanied wrestler Kurrgan in a taped match against Eric Sbraccia, which aired on the September 12 edition of Shotgun Saturday Night. At the broadcast, Bruce and Utsler requested for more than just a rapping role; they wanted to wrestle. McMahon favored the idea and allowed them to participate.

Insane Clown Posse was put in a feud with The Headbangers. In the first wrestling match, The Headbangers were stiff, throwing real punches and kicks. In the rematch, a move was planned where The Headbangers would be flipped over by Bruce and Utsler. When the time came to flip over, however, The Headbangers refused to move, forcing Insane Clown Posse to genuinely flip them over and begin throwing punches. Realizing that the match was getting too heated, McMahon ended the feud after that match. Bruce and Utsler were put into other matches along with The Oddities. Vince Russo told Bruce and Utsler to "make it seem like you don't know anything about wrestling, and you guys keep choking and digging into their eyes". During this time, Bruce and Utsler had no contract with WWF. They, however, did have an agreement that the WWF would occasionally play Insane Clown Posse commercials, and in return, Bruce and Utsler would wrestle for free. Bruce and Utsler knew that airtime cost significantly more than any monetary compensation they would receive and were thus satisfied with the agreement. Bruce and Utsler were told they were to suddenly turn on The Oddities in their match against The Headbangers, then join them in beating up the group. They were also informed that their commercial would air the very next week, which had still not aired after three months of being involved with the WWF. The following week, on the live November 30 Raw is War episode, the Insane Clown Posse and The Headbangers had a run-in with Stone Cold Steve Austin. Prior to the show, Austin had indicated to Bruce and Thrasher that Thrasher would receive the first Stone Cold Stunner, after which Bruce would turn around and receive the second. During the televised segment, Austin was shown making his way to the ring carrying a shovel. Once in the ring, Austin hit the Stunner on Bruce first (catching him off guard), then Thrasher. Although disappointed over the events during the match, Bruce and Utsler continued in hopes that McMahon would air the commercial as promised. Bruce and Utsler contacted Abyss to inquire about the commercial and were informed that it was not aired. Given that McMahon failed to uphold his promise to air Insane Clown Posse's commercial, Abyss recommended that Bruce and Utsler terminate their agreement with the WWF.

=== Hellfire Wrestling (1998) ===
While involved with the WWF, Insane Clown Posse brought Dan Curtis with them. After leaving the WWF, Curtis suggested that Insane Clown Posse start its own promotion while continuing with their music. He came to Bruce's house each night to discuss ideas about the promotion. Curtis convinced Bruce to coordinate another Strangle-Mania Live show, to be followed by an eighty-city "Hellfire Wrestling" tour. Curtis booked the talent and wrote the scripts. Strangle-Mania Live sold out the Majestic Theater in Detroit. Two days after the show, Curtis was found dead in his apartment, due to a sudden diabetic problem. The "Hellfire Wrestling" tour was subsequently canceled.

=== World Championship Wrestling (1999–2000) ===
Insane Clown Posse went on to wrestle a long stint in World Championship Wrestling, starting in 1999. The duo formed two stables. The first stable, The Dead Pool, consisted of Insane Clown Posse, Vampiro, and Raven; the second consisted of Insane Clown Posse, Vampiro, Great Muta, and Kiss Demon, known as The Dark Carnival.

On August 9, 1999, Insane Clown Posse made their WCW debut on Monday Nitro in a six-man tag team match. Insane Clown Posse and Vampiro defeated Lash LeRoux, Norman Smiley, and Prince Iaukea. At Road Wild 1999, Rey Mysterio, Jr., Billy Kidman, and Eddie Guerrero defeated Vampiro. Insane Clown Posse continued to wrestle on Monday Nitro, defeating Public Enemy one week, and losing to Konnan and Rey Mysterio, Jr. another. At Fall Brawl 1999, the tag team of Rey Mysterio, Eddie Guerrero, and Billy Kidman again defeated Vampiro and Insane Clown Posse. On September 13, Insane Clown Posse defeated Lenny Lane and Lodi.

On the August 23, 2000 episode of Thunder, Great Muta, Vampiro, and Insane Clown Posse beat Tank Abbott and 3 Count. Five days later, on Nitro, Insane Clown Posse and Vampiro defeated 3 Count, and the following week, Rey Mysterio, Jr. and Juventud Guerrera beat Insane Clown Posse. On September 25, Mike Awesome defeated Insane Clown Posse in a Handicap Hardcore match after Awesome-Bombing Shaggy 2 Dope onto the roof of Awesome's bus. The slippery metal surface of the bus lead to Shaggy slipping and falling many feet onto the concrete floor.

=== Juggalo Championship Wrestling (1999-present) ===
On December 19, 1999, Bruce and Utsler created their own wrestling promotion, Juggalo Championshit Wrestling (now known as Juggalo Championship Wrestling). That night, the duo defeated the team of two Doink the Clowns to become the first ever JCW Tag Team Champions. The event was taped and released as JCW, Volume 1. Commentary was provided by Bruce and Utsler under their '3D' and 'Gweedo' announcing personas. In 2000, Insane Clown Posse and Evil Dead defeated The Rainbow Coalition, and the match was featured on JCW, Volume 2. In 2003, Insane Clown Posse defended, and retained, their JCW Tag Team Championships against Kid Cock (a parody of Kid Rock) and Feminem (a parody of Eminem). The match was featured on JCW, Volume 3.

In 2007, JCW launched SlamTV!. With it came the first broadcast of JCW since the three initial DVDs. Bruce returned to commentary as Diamond Donovan Douglas, and Utsler returned as "Handsome" Harley Guestella. 3D and Gweedo announced in an episode of SlamTV! that Insane Clown Posse had been stripped of the JCW Tag Team Championships due to them not defending the title. At the first annual Bloodymania, JCW's premier wrestling event, Insane Clown Posse teamed with Sabu to defeat Trent Acid and The Young Alter Boys w/ Annie Social the Nun.

In late 2007, Insane Clown Posse formed the stable Juggalo World Order (JWO). On November 9, the Juggalo World Order (Scott Hall, 2 Dope, Violent J, 2 Tuff Tony, and Corporal Robinson) "invaded" Total Nonstop Action Wrestling's Turning Point PPV by purchasing front row tickets to the event. They proceeded to promote their group by flashing their jerseys before being removed from the building. The group expressed interest in "invading" WWE at its 2009 Royal Rumble PPV, but were unable due to filming commitments for Big Money Rustlas. At Bloodymania III, Juggalo World Order (Robinson, Hall, 2 Dope, Violent J, and Sid Vicious) defeated the team of Trent Acid and the Alter Boys (Tim, Tom, Terry, and Todd).

=== Independent circuit ===
On March 17, 2000, Insane Clown Posse wrestled in Mid American Wrestling and defeated Big Flame, Neal, and Bob in a Handicap match. The following year, on 2001, Bruce appeared in Xtreme Pro Wrestling at XPW Rapture to aid Utsler. After Bruce suffered a real-life injury from a sloppy clothesline, the duo left the company. On October 5, 2002, Insane Clown Posse wrestled in Ring of Honor and defeated Oman Tortuga and Diablo Santiago. Both members of the team were later made playable characters in both Eidos Interactive's video games Backyard Wrestling: Don't Try This at Home and Backyard Wrestling 2: There Goes the Neighborhood. To help promote the games, they competed in a series of matches for Backyard Wrestling in 2003 and 2004.

On December 12, 2004, the duo competed in the event A Night of Appreciation for Sabu, teaming with the Rude Boy to defeat the team of Corporal Robinson, Zach Gowen, and Breyer Wellington. In 2005, Utsler had neck surgery that left him unable to fully compete for two years. In late 2006, the duo was involved in a rivalry with the promotion Pro Wrestling Unplugged. They appeared at the company's event "PWU vs JCW" and attacked the tag team The O’Doyles. At the following event, Utsler managed Team JCW (Nosawa, 2 Tuff Tony, Violent J, Mad Man Pondo, and Raven) in a War Games match against Team PWU (Trent Acid, Corporal Robinson, Johnny Kashmere, Pete Hunter, and Gary Wolfe) with manager Tod Gordon.

Since Utsler fully recovered from his neck surgery in 2007, Insane Clown Posse has continued to appear at various promotions in the independent circuit.

=== Total Nonstop Action Wrestling (2004) ===
On January 21, 2004, Insane Clown Posse appeared on an episode of the weekly NWA Total Nonstop Action PPV. The duo were shown partying in the crowd alongside the juggalos in attendance. In the main event of the night, which featured Jeff Jarrett going against El Leon, Jarrett and El Leon were fighting in the crowd when Insane Clown Posse sprayed Faygo in Jarrett's eyes. The following week, Insane Clown Posse were interviewed in the ring by Mike Tenay. The duo explained that they were fans of TNA, and that they wanted to be a part of the promotion themselves. As they started making (kayfabe) negative remarks toward Jeff Jarrett, Glenn Gilberti and David Young interrupted. When Gilberti tried to convince the duo to apologize to Jarrett, Insane Clown Posse chased Gilberti and Young out of the ring before challenging the team to a match for the next week.

On February 4, Insane Clown Posse defeated Glen Gilberti and David Young. Later that night, Scott Hudson interviewed Insane Clown Posse, and the duo announced that they would face whoever Jeff Jarrett threw at them next in a "Juggalo Street Fight". Insane Clown Posse won against the team of Glen Gilberti and Kid Kash on February 18. Two weeks later, Insane Clown Posse announced that they would take part in a "Dark Carnival Match" the next week against Glen Gilberti and any partner he chooses. The following week, Insane Clown Posse and 2 Tuff Tony took on Glen Gilberti, Kid Kash, and David Young. "The Alpha Male" Monty Brown made his TNA return, and cost Insane Clown Posse and 2 Tuff Tony the match. During their stint in TNA, Insane Clown Posse brought the company its largest comped ticket crowds in history. After the duo left, they remained close with the company.

On March 17, 2006, Insane Clown Posse hosted and booked TNA's first ever house show, which took place in Plymouth, Michigan. The duo defeated Team Canada members Eric Young and Petey Williams.

== Championships and accomplishments ==
- Juggalo Championship Wrestling
  - JCW Tag Team Championship (2 times)
