= Bull Pain =

German born American professional wrestler

Personal information
- Born: Frank Vizi; June 9, 1961 (age 65) Mannheim, Baden-Württemberg, West Germany

Professional wrestling career
- Ring name(s): Bull Pain; Bull Payne; Psycho; Rick Gantner; Rick Golden
- Billed height: 6 ft 2 in (1.88 m)
- Billed weight: 260 lb (120 kg)
- Trained by: Tom Stone
- Debut: 1984
- Retired: 2012

Frank Vizi (born June 9, 1961) is an American professional wrestler, better known by the ring names Bull Pain, Rick Gantner and Psycho. He worked in professional wrestling promotion for the American Wrestling Association, World Wrestling Federation, World Championship Wrestling and Extreme Championship Wrestling, as well as independent circuit promotions the World Wrestling Council, Independent Wrestling Association Mid-South, Juggalo Championship Wrestling and Chikara.

== Early life ==
Vizi had a grounding in martial arts and boxing, but, having been taken to AWA shows by his father, became a fan of professional wrestling (particularly Superstar Billy Graham, The Crusher and The Valiant Brothers).

== Professional wrestling career ==
=== Early career (1984–1985) ===
Vizi was trained to wrestle by Tom Stone. He debuted in Milwaukee in 1984 under the ring name "Rick Golden", facing Lance Atlas in his first match. Later that year he joined NWA Heart of America, adopting the ring name "Rick Gantner".

=== American Wrestling Association (1984–1990) ===
In 1984, Ganter joined the Minneapolis, Minnesota-based American Wrestling Association as a jobber. He worked with the company until the promotion went out of business in 1990.

=== World Wrestling Federation (1987–1988) ===
In 1987, Ganter joined the World Wrestling Federation as a jobber. He worked for the promotion until 1988, appearing regularly on WWF Superstars and WWF Wrestling Challenge.

=== Independent circuit (1988–1995) ===
From 1988, Vizi wrestled on the independent circuit for promotions including the United States Wrestling Association, Windy City Pro Wrestling and Global Wrestling Federation. In 1992, he wrestled in Mexico with the Universal Wrestling Association.

In 1990, Vizi donned a mask, adopted the ring name "Psycho" and formed a tag team with Killer named The Texas Hangmen. The Texas Hangmen achieved their greatest success in the Puerto Rico-based World Wrestling Council, winning the WWC World Tag Team Championship on four occasions.

=== Extreme Championship Wrestling (1995) ===
While wrestling for Global Wrestling Federation, Vizi developed the Bull Pain gimmick, using an old high school football nickname. At the same time Ian Rotten was in a feud with his kayfabe brother Axl Rotten in Extreme Championship Wrestling, during which Axl Rotten disappeared. As Ian and Bull Pain had previously worked together in USWA, he recommended Bull Pain as a replacement, and the two had a brief feud, including Taipei Death Matches and Barbed Wire Baseball Bat Matches. Bull Pain was also wrestling at this time as a regular "enhancement talent" for World Championship Wrestling, wrestling the likes of Jim Duggan, Hak, Van Hammer, Johnny B Badd, and Bobby Duncum, Jr.

=== Big Japan Pro Wrestling (1996) ===
In 1996, Bull Pain toured Japan with Big Japan Pro Wrestling.

=== World Championship Wrestling (1996, 1998–1999) ===
Vizi debuted in World Championship Wrestling on January 18, 1996, as "Bull Payne", unsuccessfully challenging Johnny B. Badd for the WCW World Television Championship.

He appeared with WCW throughout 1998 and 1999.

=== IWA-Mid South and return to the independent circuit (1996–2012) ===
In 1996, Vizi debuted in the Independent Wrestling Association Mid-South. He went on to both hold the Television and Light Heavyweight Championships, as well as holding the Heavyweight Championship five times.

He also worked for Heartland Wrestling Association from 1998 to 2000 and 2004 to 2006.

He also worked for Kick Ass Wrestling (Now Known as Memphis Championship Wrestling) from 1999 to 2000 where he was the KAW Heavyweight Champion.

Bull Pain debuted in Juggalo Championship Wrestling in 2007 at East Side Wars by attacking hero 2 Tuff Tony. In the following weeks, Pain continued to beat opponents mercilessly using a metal baseball bat he called Brother Pain. At Bloodymania, 2 Tuff Tony defeated Bull Pain in a Louisville Slugger match. The following year at Bloodymania II, Pain replaced Isabella Smothers to team with Tracy Smothers in a losing effort against 2 Tuff Tony and Boondox.

Following a run-in at Deuces Wild, Bull Pain made his Chikara in-ring debut at Passion and Persistence (April 20, 2008) at the New Alhambra Arena, teaming with Vin Gerard against The Colony (Fire Ant and Soldier Ant). Due to Pain's use of his signature baseball bat, which he nicknamed Brother Pain, Pain and Gerard were disqualified, and Leonard F. Chikarason (Chikara's Director of Fun) banned them both from appearing on any Chikara shows for 30 days. Pain has not been seen in the company since.

Pain continued his losing streak at Bloodymania III, losing a Tough Man Match to Butterbean. At Oddball Wrestling 2010, Bull Pain and Ian Bloody lost to Corporal Robinson and 2 Tuff Tony in a Taipei Deathmatch. The following night at Bloodymania IV, Pain and Bloody interfered in a match on Tracy Smothers' behalf. The duo was fended off by Jim Duggan and Smothers' opponent Booker T.

By the end of 2010, Pain was put into a storyline in which he was seemingly dating Tracy Smothers' daughter Isabella. Both Pain and Isabella became involved in a rivalry with The Weedman. On March 26, 2011, Pain took part in Juggalo Championship Wrestling's first internet pay-per-view Hatchet Attacks. Teaming with Baby Bitch Boy and The Bumpin' Uglies, Pain lost to the team of The Weedman, 2 Tuff Tony, Jailbird Man, and Rhino. At the following event, he lost to The Weedman in a match that seemingly ended their feud. At Bloodymania 2011, Bull teamed with Tracy Smothers in a losing effort against Necro Butcher and Mad Man Pondo, The Ring Rydas and Raven and Slim Goody. Raven and Goody left with the Tag Team straps.

== Championships and accomplishments ==
- Heartland Wrestling Association
  - HWA Bar Room Brawl Championship (1 time)
- Independent Association of Wrestling
  - IAW Tag Team Championship (4 times) – with Killer
- Independent Wrestling Association Mid-South
  - IWA Mid-South Heavyweight Championship (5 times)
  - IWA Mid-South Light Heavyweight Championship (1 time)
  - IWA Mid-South Television Championship (1 time)
- Kick Ass Wrestling
  - KAW Heavyweight Championship (1 time)
- Memphis Championship Wrestling
  - MCW Southern Tag Team Championship (1 time) – with Todd Morton
- Pro Wrestling Illustrated
  - PWI ranked him #307 of the 500 best singles wrestlers in the PWI 500 in 1993
- Tri-State Wrestling
  - Tri-State Tag Team Championship (1 time) - with Killer
- United States Wrestling Association
  - USWA World Tag Team Championship (1 time) – with Killer
- Windy City Pro Wrestling
  - WCPW Tag Team Championship (4 times) – with Killer (3) and Himself (1)
- World Wrestling Council
  - WWC World Tag Team Championship (2 times) – with Killer
