= Bloodymania IV =

2010 Juggalo Championship Wrestling event

- Promotion: Juggalo Championship Wrestling
- Date: August 15, 2010
- City: Cave-In-Rock, Illinois
- Venue: Hogrock Campground
- Attendance: approx. 3,000

Bloodymania chronology
← Previous; Bloodymania III	Next → Bloodymania 5

Bloodymania IV was a professional wrestling event produced by Juggalo Championship Wrestling (JCW), which took place at midnight on August 15, 2010 at Hog Rock in Cave-In-Rock, Illinois. Professional wrestling is a type of sports entertainment in which theatrical events are combined with a competitive sport. The buildup to the matches and the scenarios that took place before, during, and after the event were planned by JCW's script writers. The event starred wrestlers from Juggalo Championship Wrestling, as well as guest wrestlers from the independent circuit. Like Bloodymania III, the event did not feature a buildup from a season of JCW's SlamTV! internet wrestling show.

Eight matches were held on the event's card. The main event match was a Triple Threat match for the JCW Heavyweight Championship where the champion Corporal Robinson defeated Mike Knox and Raven. Featured matches on the undercard included a singles match where The Weedman defeated Officer Colt Cabana, a singles match which saw Booker T defeat "Southern" Tracy Smothers, a tag team Deathmatch where Balls Mahoney and Hollywood Chuck Hogan defeated the team of Mad Man Pondo and Necro Butcher, and a Fatal 4 way tag team match for the JCW Tag Team Championship in which The Kings of Wrestling defeated the champions The Haters and the Briscoe Brothers and Ring Rydas.

The event had an attendance of approximately 3,000, and was released on DVD on January 8, 2011. The video, JCW at the Gathering Wrestle Reunion Edition, also featured Oddball Wrestling 2010 and both Flashlight Wrestling 2010 events.

== Background ==
Bloodymania IV featured professional wrestling matches that involved different wrestlers from pre-existing scripted feuds, plots, and storylines that were played out on SlamTV!, Juggalo Championship Wrestling's (JCW) internet program. Wrestlers were portrayed as either a villain or a hero as they followed a series of events that built tension, and culminated into a wrestling match or series of matches. The event featured wrestlers from JCW's SlamTV!.

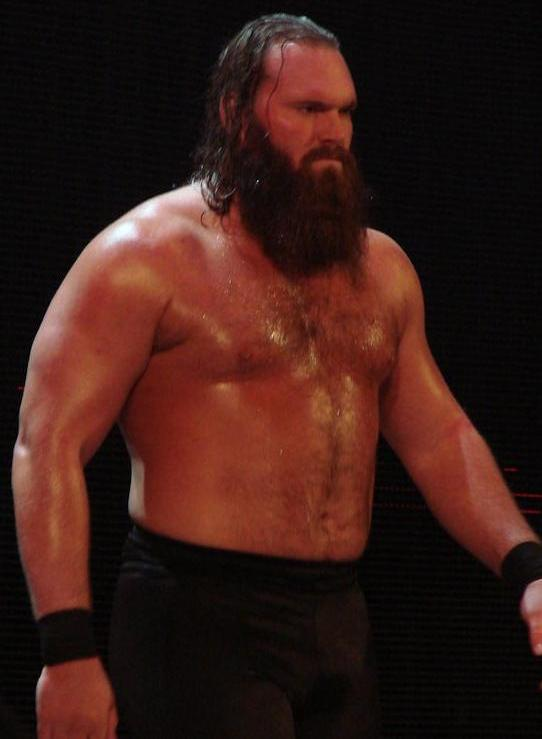
Mike Knox competed against Corporal Robinson and Raven

The predominant rivalry for the show was a confrontation for the JCW Heavyweight Championship between the champion Corporal Robinson, Mike Knox, and Raven. During the second season of SlamTV!, Scott D'Amore proclaimed that he was going to reform Juggalo Championship Wrestling. In the two following years, D'Amore brought in several competitors to attempt to defeat Corporal Robinson for the championship, but all had failed. That same year, Raven assaulted and stole the JCW Heavyweight Championship belt from Robinson. The two continued to battle throughout the season, leading to Robinson defeating Raven in a Ladder match at Bloodymania II. Corporal Robinson, managed by Terry Funk, was then booked to face Raven, managed by Todd Bridges, and Mike Knox, managed by Scott D'Amore, in a Triple Threat match at Bloodymania IV.

In early 2008, the Thomaselli Brothers became involved in a brief feud with the heroic tag team Ring Rydas. At Big Ballas X-Mas Party '08, the Thomaselli Brothers disguised themselves as The Ring Rydas and defeated The Bump-N-Uglies to win the JCW Tag Team Championship. On June 3, 2010, as part of a storyline, the Thomaselli Brothers were renamed The Haters by Juggalo Championship Wrestling owners Insane Clown Posse due to their villainous actions. The Haters were placed in a Fatal 4 way tag team match in which they would defend their tag team championship against the Briscoe Brothers, the Kings of Wrestling, and Ring Rydas.

Officer Colt Cabana first appeared in Juggalo Championship Wrestling through a promo in which he spoke of keeping order and forcing fans to show respect for the law. He targeted hero The Weedman as the first offender to be brought down, due to The Weedman's storyline illegal use of smoking and selling marijuana. Cabana made his in-ring debut at Insane Clown Posse's Bang! Pow! Boom! Nuclear Edition Release Party!, losing to The Weedman. Cabana attacked The Weedman after the match, delivering a Tombstone Piledriver outside of the ring. A rematch was scheduled for Bloodymania IV.

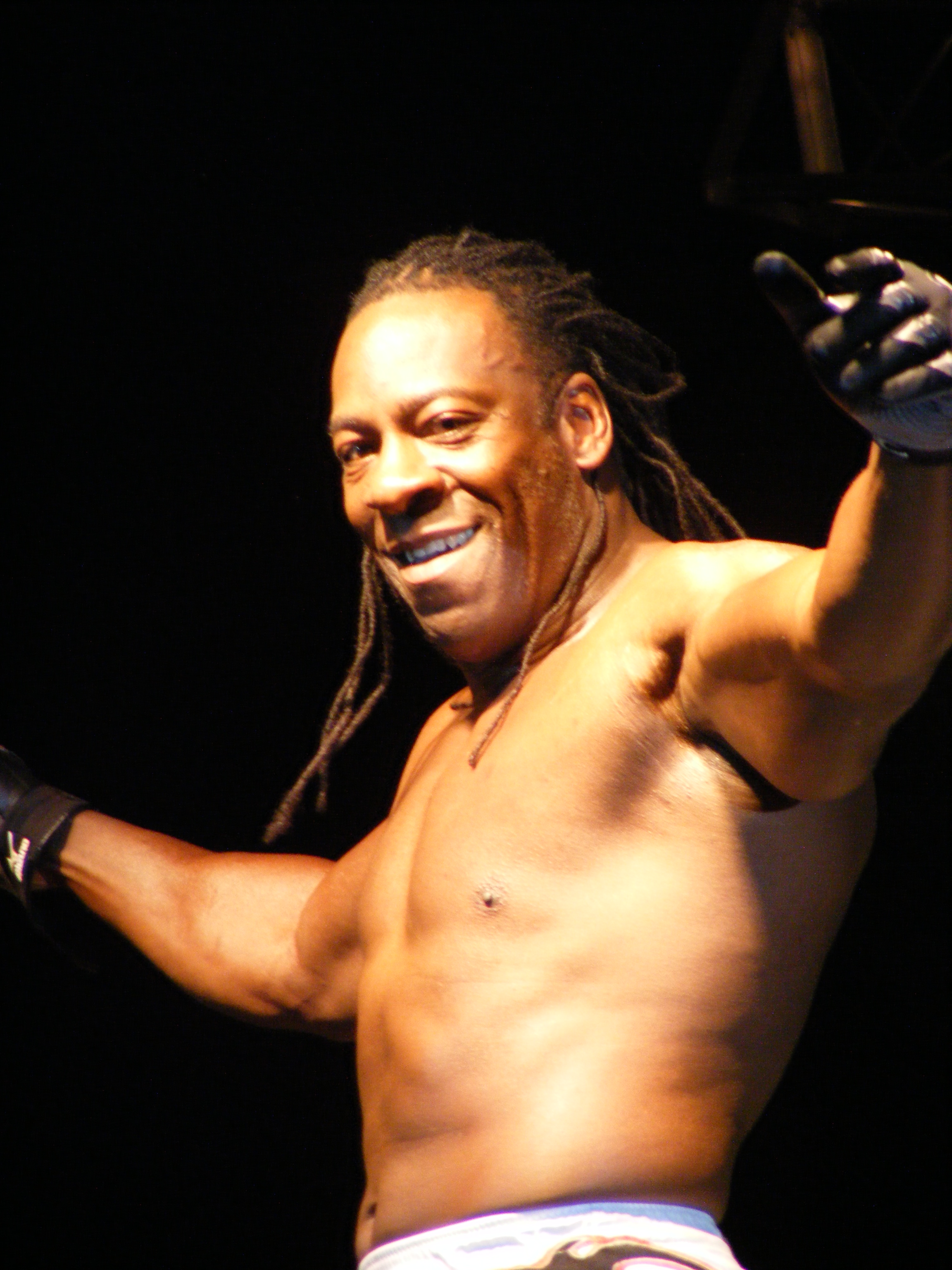
Booker T faced Tracy Smothers

Throughout the first and second seasons of SlamTV!, villain Tracy Smothers had been involved in a feud with hero 2 Tuff Tony. In the third episode of season two, Tracy caught his illegitimate daughter Isabella listening to Boondox, the rapper who sings 2 Tuff Tony's entrance music. The following week, Smothers caught Isabella engaging in sexual actions with Boondox, through storyline, and assaulted him. At Bloodymania II, the team of 2 Tuff Tony and Boondox defeated Tracy Smothers and Bull Pain. Smothers was placed in a match with Booker T, who would be accompanied by Boondox, at Bloodymania IV.

At Bloodymania III, Balls Mahoney attacked 2 Tuff Tony in his match against Viscera, causing Tony to lose the match and be banned from Bloodymania. Mahoney later explained that he had been trying to get hired by the company for several years, but was ignored. He attacked hero 2 Tuff Tony to make an impact on the company and show that he was an important asset. Mahoney and teammate Hollywood Chuck Hogan were booked to face Mad Man Pondo and Necro Butcher in a tag team Ultra-Deathmatch, where there was no disqualifications and the use of weapons was encouraged.

== Event ==
=== Preliminary matches ===
The first preliminary match saw The Weedman kick Officer Colt Cabana in the chin for the pinfall. Prior to the next match, per storyline, Shawn Daivari attacked one of his opponents Road Dogg Jesse James backstage. Daivari and Joey Ryan then wrestled while James was left incapacitated. While attempting to enter the match midway through, James was knocked to the outside of the ring by Daivari. The end saw Sabu interfere and perform a diving leg drop with a steel chair onto Daivari, allowing Joey Ryan to pick up the pinfall.

The following match was a four-team tag team elimination match for the JCW Tag Team Championship featuring the champions The Haters, Briscoe Brothers, the Kings of Wrestling, and Ring Rydas. Early in the match, Jay Briscoe had lifted Chris Hero onto his shoulders when Hero tagged in Vito Thomaselli. Vito then went behind Briscoe and pulled him backwards for the pinfall, eliminating the Briscoe Brothers from the match. Soon after, Vito lifted Ring Ryda Blue and placed him on Pauly's shoulders. Pauly then slammed Blue down back first onto his knees and pinned him, eliminating the Ring Rydas. Following a lengthy battle between the two remaining teams, Claudio Castagnoli lifted Vito onto Hero's shoulders. They then flipped him in the air before dropping him back first onto the mat for the victory, becoming the new JCW Tag Team Champions.

Butterbean quickly defeated Twinkie Hop with a knockout punch in the fourth match. Eugene then ran into the ring and delivered a stunner to Butterbean. Managed by Boondox in the next match, Booker T faced Tracy Smothers, who was managed by Isabella Smothers. Near the end of the match, Bull Pain and Ian Bloody interfered and attacked Booker. Jim Duggan ran into the ring and fended off both Pain and Bloody. Booker T then pinned Smothers after driving his leg into the back of Smothers' neck. In the following match, Isis scored a pinfall after lifting Isabella by her neck then slamming her back to the mat.

In the final preliminary match, Balls Mahoney and Hollywood Chuck Hogan faced Mad Man Pondo and Necro Butcher in a tag team Ultra-Deathmatch. The end saw Mahoney pick up the pinfall on Necro after performing the Nutcracker Suite onto a steel chair, a move in which Mahoney lifted him upside down then sat down while driving Necro to the mat neck first. Following the victory, Hollywood Chuck Hogan unmasked himself to reveal that he was actually 2 Tuff Tony. Tony then lifted and threw Mahoney onto the ropes, climbed to the top turnbuckle, and landed a somersault leg drop onto the back of Mahoney's neck.

=== Main event matches ===
The main event of the night was a triple threat match for the JCW Heavyweight Championship between the champion Corporal Robinson, managed by Terry Funk, Mike Knox, managed by Scott D'Amore, and the mystery opponent Lord Ninja, managed by Todd Bridges. Early in the match, Ninja spit mist into Robinson's eyes and kicked him in the chin. He then removed the hoodie and bandana that was covering his face and revealed himself to be Raven. He and Knox teamed together to attack Robinson for several minutes before Corporal kicked Raven in the chin and landed a diving leg drop onto Knox. Following a fight between managers Scott D'Amore and Todd Bridges, Terry Funk entered the ring and delivered a series of punches to D'Amore and Mike Knox. Raven then put Funk in a front facelock and drove him face first into the mat. As Raven attempted the move a second time, Corporal Robinson grabbed him and applied a cobra clutch. He then hooked his foot behind Raven's leg and threw himself backwards for the pinfall to retain his championship.

After the match, Funk grabbed Raven's right leg and applied a Spinning toe hold. The Haters later ran into the ring and attacked Robinson and Funk while they were celebrating. Robinson and Funk fought back and scared the duo toward the back of the stage. Juggalo World Order member Sid Vicious came down and threw the duo back into the ring. He then powerbombed both Vito and Pauly before celebrating with Robinson and Funk.

== Results ==
No.	Results	Stipulations	Times
1	Weedman (with Johnny Richter) defeated Officer Colt Cabana	Singles match	09:13
2	Joey Ryan defeated Shawn Daivari (with Truth Martini) and Road Dogg Jesse James	Triple Threat match	10:11
3	The Kings of Wrestling (Chris Hero and Claudio Castagnoli) defeated The Haters (Pauly and Vito Thomaselli) (c), Briscoe Brothers (Jay Briscoe and Mark Briscoe), and Ring Rydas (Ring Ryda Blue and Red)	Four-team tag team elimination match for the JCW Tag Team Championship	14:25
4	Butterbean defeated Twinkie Hop	Singles match	05:16
5	Booker T (with Boondox) defeated Tracy Smothers (with Isabella Smothers)	Singles match	08:38
6	Isis (with Sugar Slam) defeated Isabella Smothers	Singles match	04:33
7	Balls Mahoney and Hollywood Chuck Hogan defeated Mad Man Pondo and Necro Butcher	Tag team Ultra-Deathmatch	20:19
8	Corporal Robinson (c) (with Terry Funk) defeated Mike Knox (with Scott D'Amore) and Raven (with Todd Bridges)	Triple threat match for the JCW Heavyweight Championship	22:45
(c) / – the champion(s) heading into the match

Four-team tag team elimination match

Elimination	Team	Time
1	Briscoe Brothers	n/a
2	Ring Rydas	n/a
3	The Haters	14:25
Winners:	The Kings of Wrestling	
