= Evil Deeds (2025) =

2025 Game Changer Wrestling livestreaming event

- Promotional poster
- Promotion: Game Changer Wrestling
- Date: September 12, 2025
- City: Detroit, Michigan
- Venue: Harpos Concert Theatre

Game Changer Wrestling pay-per-view event chronology
← Previous; Homecoming Weekend	Next → Rumble on the River

Other on-screen personnel
Role:	Name:
Commentators	Dave Prazak
Commentators	Emil Jay
Commentators	John Mosley
Ring announcers	Emil Jay

Evil Deeds was a professional wrestling pay-per-view event produced by Game Changer Wrestling. The event took place on September 12, 2025 at the Harpos Concert Theatre in Detroit, Michigan and was streamed live on Triller TV. The event also featured wrestlers from Juggalo Championship Wrestling (JCW).

== Production ==
=== Background ===
On September 14, 2024, at Game Changer Wrestling's Bad One pay-per-view in Detroit, Violent J of Insane Clown Posse made an appearance during a six-man tag team consisting of 2 Tuff Tony, Breyer Wellington, and Mad Man Pondo, who Violent J had accompanied, against Thrunt (1 Called Manders, Dark Sheik, and Effy) in a six man tag team match. Despite losing the match, Violent J issued a challenge to GCW to a "2 day war" at the Gathering of the Juggalos the following year. On November 15, 2024, Mance Warner defended the GCW World Championship against 2 Tuff Tony during the Chaos in Kentucky pay-per-view in Louisville, Kentucky. After several exhibition matches between the two sides, Violent J would accompany 2 Tuff Tony and the Backseat Boyz (Tommy Grayson and JP Grayson) to The People vs. GCW kickoff show at the Hammerstein Ballroom in New York City on January 21, 2025 in a pre-show rumble. 2 Tuff Tony would be the fourth wrestler to be eliminated on the rumble by former JCW Heavyweight Champion, Shane Mercer.

A JCW exhibition six wrestler tag team match between the Backseat Boyz (Tommy Grayson and JP Grayson) and The Wraith against Dani Mo and the Brothers of Funstruction (Yabo The Clown and Ruffo The Clown) took place on GCW's Amerikaz Most Wanted pay-per-view on March 30, 2025 in Sauget, Illinois which featured Violent J on commentary along with JCW's ring announcer, The Ringmaster. Violent J would also accompany 2 Tuff Tony and Mickie Knuckles who would fight against The Rejects (John Wayne Murdoch and Reed Bentley) in the main event of the show. After Amerikaz Most Wanted had ended, a riot had broken out on stage during a Violent J post-show concert where the GCW and JCW wrestlers brawled on stage during the concert and backstage.

On April 20, 2025, during the Joey Janela's Spring Break: Clusterf**k Forever pay-per-view, Mickie Knuckles, 2 Tuff Tony, the Brothers of Funstruction (Yabo The Clown and Ruffo The Clown), the Backseat Boyz (Tommy Grayson and JP Grayson), and Dani Mo entered into the Clusterf**k Battle Royal representing JCW in which they had taken control of the ring for a brief period before Matt Tremont, Bam Sullivan, Big Joe, Lou Nixon, Dr. Redacted, and John Wayne Murdoch entered as Team GCW and would brawl backstage during the match.

On the May 1, 2025 episode of JCW Lunacy, Effy would make his debut in JCW. Several more GCW wrestlers would make appearances on various Lunacy episodes in which Joey Janela, Matt Tremont, Jimmy Lloyd, and Sonny Kiss would regularly be featured in various matches representing GCW in the build up to the 2 Day War.

During GCW's Cage of Survival 4 pay-per-view on June 8, 2025 at Showboat Atlantic City in Atlantic City, New Jersey, an eight man tag team match would take place between Team JCW (2 Tuff Tony, Mickie Knuckles, Ruffo The Clown, and Yabo The Clown) against Team GCW (Effy, Jimmy Lloyd, John Wayne Murdoch, and Matt Tremont). However, the match would be thrown out and escalate into a riot which made its way outside the Showboat.

On July 4, 2025 during GCW's Backyard Wrestling 7, Tommy Grayson of the Backseat Boyz suffered an ankle injury during a match against YDNP (Alec Price and Jordan Oliver), forcing him to be sidelined from wrestling in the months leading up to the Gathering. He would be replaced on the card for JCW's Powder Keg pay-per-view with Shane Mercer and Matt Cross on the 2 Day War.

On July 17, 2025, JCW and GCW held a pay-per-view event titled GCW x JCW Showcase Showdown: The Violence is Right in which the main event would be Mad Man Pondo defending the JCW Heavyweight Championship against Matt Tremont in a death match. During the match, GCW owner Brett Lauderdale would intervene and result in Tremont winning the title for the first time.

On August 2, 2025 during JCW's Powder Keg pay-per-view in Rutherford, New Jersey, John Wayne Murdoch was set on fire during a match in which he teamed with 1 Called Manders and Matt Tremont against the team of JCW Hall of Famers represented by 2 Tuff Tony, Mad Man Pondo, and Mickie Knuckles. At the end of the match, Murdoch would be set on fire after being suplexed through a burning table by Pondo. The match would be declared a no contest as a result. The stunt had forced him to be rushed to the hospital after the show. On the following live episode of JCW Lunacy on August 12, 2025 at the Gathering of the Juggalos, Violent J would announce that Mickie Knuckles and Mad Man Pondo would be suspended after the stunt and that Pondo would be pulled from his rematch with Matt Tremont for the JCW Heavyweight Championship. He was replaced by 2 Tuff Tony who defeated Tremont to win the JCW Heavyweight Championship for the sixth time in a barbed wire death match.

During the first night of GCW's Homecoming pay-per-view on August 23, 2025, Violent J, Caleb Konley, and 2 Tuff Tony invaded the ring during an in-ring promo by GCW owner Brett Lauderdale who challenged Violent J to a WarGames match at Fight Club.

== Results ==
No.	Results	Stipulations	Times
1	KJ Orso defeated Brayden Toon, Chase Burnett, Gary Jay, Jeffrey John, and Tre Lamar	Six-way scramble match	9:01
2	Mance Warner defeated Beastman by pinfall	Singles match	8:25
3	Megan Bayne defeated Shotzi Blackheart by pinfall	Singles match	14:05
4	1 Called Manders defeated Dominic Garrini by pinfall	Singles match	7:48
5	The Cogar Brothers (Atticus Cogar and Otis Cogar) (with Christian Napier) defeated Bobby Beverly and Matt Tremont by pinfall	Tag team death match	12:47
6	Dr. Redacted defeated Crazy King by pinfall	Death match	12:46
7	Effy and Gringo Loco defeated Bang And Matthews (August Matthews and Davey Bang), Boisterous Behaviour (Leon Slater and Man Like DeReiss), Joey Janela and Marcus Mathers	Four-way tag team match	16:08
8	The Brothers of Funstruction (Ruffo The Clown and Yabo The Clown) defeated YDNP (Jordan Oliver and Alec Price (c) by pinfall	Tag team Riddlebox for the GCW World Tag Team Championship and the JCW Tag Team Championship	16:04
9	The Rejects (John Wayne Murdoch and Reed Bentley) defeated The Pillars (Malcolm Monroe III and Tommy Vendetta) by pinfall	Tag team death match	13:20
(c) / – the champion(s) heading into the match
