= Trent Acid =

American professional wrestler (1980–2010)

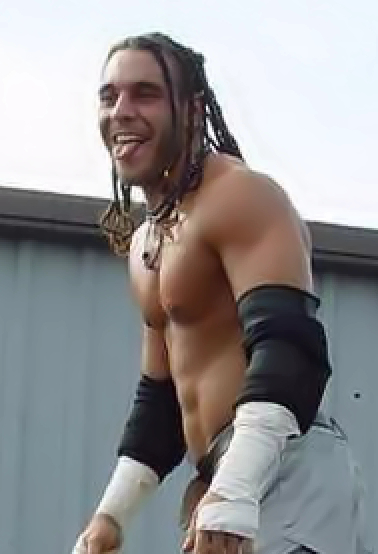
- Acid at an independent show

Personal information
- Born: Michael Verdi; November 12, 1980 Philadelphia, Pennsylvania, U.S.
- Died: June 18, 2010 (aged 29) Philadelphia, Pennsylvania, U.S.
- Cause of death: Drug overdose

Professional wrestling career
- Ring name: Trent Acid
- Billed height: 5 ft 11 in (1.80 m)
- Billed weight: 180 lb (82 kg)
- Billed from: The Vatican in South Philadelphia
- Debut: May 20, 1995

Michael Verdi (November 12, 1980 – June 18, 2010), best known by his ring name Trent Acid, was an American professional wrestler.

He worked as a tag team wrestler for most of his career, primarily as part of The Backseat Boyz with Johnny Kashmere, in several American independent promotions, including Combat Zone Wrestling and Ring of Honor. He also worked a singles career with several promotions, including Juggalo Championship Wrestling.

== Early life ==
Verdi was childhood friends with Rocky Ciarrocchi (better known as fellow wrestler Helter Skelter).

== Professional wrestling career ==
=== Early career (1995–1999) ===
Acid wrestled at the age of 14. He wrestled in independent promotions only in Philadelphia, Delaware and New Jersey.

=== Combat Zone Wrestling (1999–2004) ===
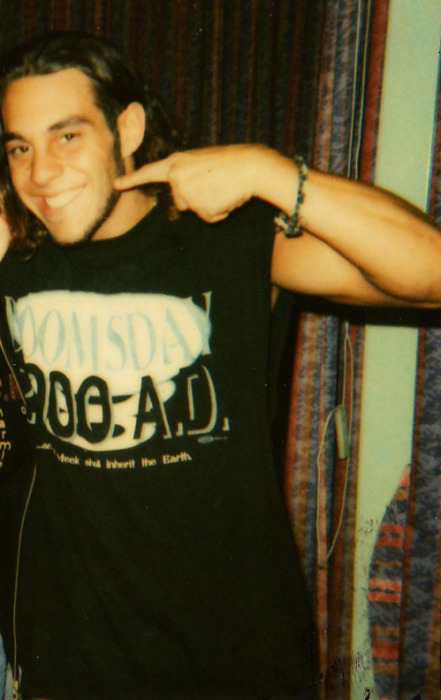
Acid in 2002

Acid debuted in Combat Zone Wrestling (CZW) in 1999 and competed mostly in singles matches. At the first Cage of Death, he teamed with White Lotus to face the Kashmerinoes (Johnny Kashmere and Robbie Mireno). Acid wrestled many matches against Kashmere before teaming up with him to form The Backseat Boyz.

The Backseat Boyz won the CZW Tag Team Championship. While part of this team, Acid still wrestled in the singles division and won the CZW World Junior Heavyweight Championship three times, competing against the likes of Ruckus and Justice Pain for the title. He also became the second Best of the Best winner by defeating Jody Fleisch in the final match at Best of the Best 2. In September 2003, Acid won the vacant CZW Iron Man Championship by defeating Nick Gage and Jimmy Rave in a three-way match.

Around this time, Acid, along with Johnny Kashmere, joined the Hi-V stable and feuded with Zandig and his ultraviolent team. This feud came to an end at Cage of Death V in the Cage of Death match. However, before competing in the Cage of Death match, Acid first had to defend his Iron Man Championship against Jimmy Rave. The match went to a time limit draw with each man scoring one fall, but the match was ordered to restart and Rave won the title. Acid went on to the Cage of Death but was eliminated and his team eventually lost. The Hi-V broke up after this and The Backseat Boyz soon left CZW. Acid returned to CZW later in 2004 and feuded with Teddy Hart and Messiah. He left again shortly after.

=== Big Japan Pro Wrestling (2000–2002) ===
At the young age of 19, Acid would go to Japan to work for Big Japan Pro Wrestling. They had a working relationship with CZW. Acid would drop the CZW World Junior Heavyweight Championship to Winger on July 2 in Tokyo. He would feud with Ryuji Ito. Then on August 19, 2001, he beat Jun Kasai for the CZW World Junior Heavyweight Championship. On December 2, 2001 he defeated Ruckus for the BJW Junior Heavyweight Championship in Philadelphia at CZW Cage of Death III. He would drop the title to The Winger at Harder Than Hardcore Series 2002 on March 3, 2002, in Yokohama.

=== Ring of Honor (2002–2004) ===
Acid joined Ring of Honor (ROH) in 2002, when he and Johnny Kashmere defeated Homicide and Steve Corino in an interpromotional match between ROH and CZW at the first Glory By Honor. The Backseat Boyz would go on to work for ROH permanently. They continued wrestling together and competed in many scramble matches against the likes of The SAT, The Carnage Crew and Special K. However, Acid is perhaps best known from ROH for his feud with Homicide which ended in a Fight Without Honor match on May 28, 2003, at Wrestlerave 03 which Acid would win.

After this feud, The Backseat Boyz won the ROH Tag Team Championship by defeating Special K in the final round of a gauntlet match for the vacant title. This made The Backseat Boyz the first team to win both the CZW and ROH Tag Team Championships. Acid and Kashmere lost the title to Special K at the next show.

Later, Kashmere left ROH and Acid would continue as a singles wrestler. At ROH's Reborn: Completion, Acid fought with Jimmy Rave but he lost after Rave hit the Rave Clash on him. At Testing The Limit, he challenged Samoa Joe for the ROH World Championship, but did not win. He was also part of the Scramble Cage Melee main event in the scramble cage. Acid had his last ROH match at Final Battle 2004 against Jimmy Jacobs. After losing this match, he quit ROH.

=== Pro Wrestling Unplugged (2004–2009) ===
Acid joined Pro Wrestling Unplugged at its inception in 2004, eventually feuding with Homicide, 2 Cold Scorpio, and Devon Moore over the PWU World Heavyweight Title. In 2005, Trent feuded with his old friend and new rival, Hellter Skelter. The feud lasted a few months, starting with Hellter claiming that Trent turned his back on their friendship and made him the evil person he is today. After months of feuding, Acid defeated Skelter in a "Philadelphia Street Fight" match on August 20, 2005. The feud continued in 2007, with Hellter wanting a rematch, and recording disturbing promos on PWU Surge TV, calling out Acid and claiming he would "carve [Acid's] flesh". Finally on November 23, 2007, Acid accepted the rematch and lost to Skelter, who had outside help from Sunny.

Acid made his return to PWU, following knee surgery, on March 16, 2008, at the event Haunted, wrestling Television Champion ZBarr to a time-limit draw. Since the departure of Tod Gordon, and subsequent handoff of sole ownership to tag-team partner Johnny Kashmere, Acid has been named co-owner of the company.

=== WWE appearance (2006) ===
Acid made a one night appearance for WWE on January 9, 2006, in a dark match on Sunday Night Heat teaming with Bison Bravado as they lost to 3-Minute Warning (Rosey and Jamal).

=== Juggalo Championship Wrestling (2006–2007) ===
Acid debuted in Juggalo Championship Wrestling (JCW) in 2007 under the gimmick of an arrogant priest. Acid, the self-proclaimed "Savior of JCW", cut a promo against the Juggalo fanbase, the company, and Insane Clown Posse (real-life owners of JCW) in the first episode of SlamTV!. He continued to badmouth the company in the following weeks while having confrontations with several heroes. On the fourth episode, Acid won a 10 Man Battle Royal to become the number one contender for Corporal Robinson's JCW Heavyweight Championship. In their first match, Acid temporarily blinded Robinson with holy water, causing the referee to end the match.

Two weeks later at West Side Wars, Acid pinned Robinson after using Robinson's championship belt as a weapon, becoming the new JCW Heavyweight Champion. Corporal Robinson received his rematch at East Side Wars in a Steel Cage match and regained the championship. At Bloodymania, Acid and The Young Alter Boys lost a Six Man Tag Team match against the team of Insane Clown Posse and Sabu.

=== Pro Wrestling Syndicate (2007–2009) ===
Acid also worked for the new promotion Pro Wrestling Syndicate where he had matches with Alex Shelley, Human Tornado, Danny Doring, Justin Credible and Sabu. On May 29, 2009, Acid won a four-way match to win the PWS Heavyweight Championship.

=== Later career (2007–2010) ===
In April 2007, Acid worked a couple of matches in England in the King of Europe Cup. In April 2008, he wrestled for Nu-Wrestling Evolution in Spain. Acid took a hiatus from wrestling from July 2008 to May 2009, after he got into trouble with the law after assaulting a neighbour. He was in prison for 9 months. Then he wrestled for Fight The World Wrestling and National Wrestling Superstars.

=== Return to Combat Zone Wrestling (2008–2009) ===
On June 14, 2008, Acid made his return to CZW when he faced World Champion Nick Gage in a non-title match. At 'An Eye for an Eye' on April 11, 2009, Acid made his full-time return to CZW. It was the main event of the evening as Sami Callihan and Jon Moxley took on Brain Damage and Drake Younger.

His last appearance for CZW was on October 10, 2009 as he lost to Greg Excellent at Served Ties.

=== Return to Juggalo Championship Wrestling (2009–2010) ===
Acid returned to JCW at Bloodymania III, where he teamed with the Alter Boys (Tim, Tom, Terry, and Todd). The group lost to the Juggalo World Order (Corporal Robinson, Scott Hall, Shaggy 2 Dope, Violent J, and Sid Vicious) in the main event.

His last match in JCW was a loss to 2 Tuff Tony at Oddball Bonanza in a barbed wire boards and baseball bats match on March 20, 2010.

== Personal life ==
On April 2, 2010, Verdi was arrested for possession of heroin. This charge combined with other previous charges, which included possession of drug paraphernalia and public intoxication. On May 12, he was sentenced to a maximum of 23 months of confinement, in addition to court mandated rehab, after reaching a plea deal. He had another trial set for July 13.

== Death ==
On the morning of June 18, 2010, Verdi was found dead at his Philadelphia home by his grandmother. The Philadelphia medical examiner's office determined that he had died because of a drug overdose.

At an ROH show in Buffalo, New York that night, ROH held a ten-bell salute to honor Verdi. At CZW Tournament of Death show on June 26 in Townsend, Delaware, CZW honored him with a ten bell salute before the show. On June 28, it was announced that a tribute show, Acid-Fest: A Tribute to Trent Acid, would be taking place at The Arena in Philadelphia on July 10. The show featured several of Verdi's friends within professional wrestling along with some of his students from PWU, which raised over $7,000 for the Trent Acid Memorial Fund, helping his family with his funeral costs. During the event Verdi was inducted into the Hardcore Hall of Fame.

Verdi was featured in the documentary Card Subject to Change, which documented the independent wrestling scene, primarily on the East Coast. Verdi talked candidly about his addiction and waking up three days after an overdose. He died before filming was completed, and the film was dedicated to his memory.

== Championships and accomplishments ==
- Assault Championship Wrestling
  - ACW Tag Team Championship (1 time) – with Johnny Kashmere
- Big Japan Pro Wrestling
  - BJW Junior Heavyweight Championship (1 time)
- Combat Zone Wrestling
  - CZW Iron Man Championship (1 time)
  - CZW World Junior Heavyweight Championship (3 times)
  - CZW Tag Team Championship (3 times) – with Johnny Kashmere
  - Best of the Best (2002)
  - CZW Hall of Fame (2019)
- East Coast Wrestling Association
  - ECWA Tag Team Championship (1 time) – with Johnny Kashmere
- Eastern Wrestling Federation/Hardway Wrestling
  - HW Tag Team Championship (3 times) – with Johnny Kashmere
- Grande Wrestling Alliance
  - GWA Lightweight Championship (1 time)
- Hardcore Hall of Fame
  - Class of 2010
- Indie Wrestling Hall of Fame
  - Class of 2024
- Jersey All Pro Wrestling
  - JAPW Tag Team Championship (3 times) – with Johnny Kashmere (2) and Billy Reil (1)
- Juggalo Championship Wrestling
  - JCW Heavyweight Championship (1 time)
- National Championship Wrestling
  - NCW Tag Team Championship (1 time) – with Johnny Kashmere
- New Millennium Wrestling
  - NMW Tag Team Championship (1 time) – with Billy Reil
- Phoenix Championship Wrestling
  - PCW Tag Team Championship (1 time) – with Johnny Kashmere
- Pro Wrestling Syndicate
  - PWS Heavyweight Championship (1 time)
- Pro Wrestling Unplugged
  - PWU Heavyweight Championship (1 time)
- Ring of Honor
  - ROH Tag Team Championship (1 time) – with Johnny Kashmere
- United States Xtreme Wrestling
  - UXW Heavyweight Championship (1 time)
  - UXW Xtreme Championship (1 time)
  - UXW United States Championship (1 time)
  - UXW Tag Team Championship (1 time) – with Mike Tobin
- Urban Wrestling Alliance
  - UWA Light Heavyweight Championship (2 times)
  - UWA Tag Team Championship (1 time) – with Billy Reil

== See also ==
- List of premature professional wrestling deaths
