= IWA East Coast =

Defunct professional wrestling promotion located in Dunbar, West Virginia

- Acronym: IWA EC
- Founded: 2004
- Defunct: 2021
- Style: Professional wrestling
- Headquarters: Dunbar, West Virginia
- Founder: Kevin Canady
- Owner: Kevin Canady

Independent Wrestling Association (IWA) East Coast, also known as IWA East Coast and IWA-EC, was an American independent professional wrestling promotion based in Dunbar, West Virginia. It was formed by Kevin Canady, also known by his ring name Mad Man Pondo, in 2004.

== History ==
On October 5, 2004, IWA East Coast held their first show titled Battle of the Butchers at the Nitro Community Center in Nitro, West Virginia in which the main event was between Abdullah The Butcher and Necro Butcher. On March 15, 2005, IWA East Coast's Need to Bleed event at the Dunbar National Guard Armory in Dunbar, West Virginia saw the first championship being defended on the show as Ruckus defended the CZW Heavyweight Championship against El Drunko.

On April 6, 2005, the first IWA East Coast Heavyweight Champion was crowned when Chris Hero defeated Mike Quackenbush. Titled Happy Hour Hatred, the event also featured title defenses for the NWA Midwest Women's Championship when Daizee Haze defended the title against Mickie Knuckles and the IWA Mid-South Heavyweight Championship when Jimmy Jacobs defended the title against Delirious.

On September 6, 2005 during the Property Damage Guaranteed event, Mad Man Pondo defended the JCW Heavyweight Championship in the promotion for the first time when he fought against the Rude Boy in a Taipei death match.

On March 22, 2009, during the Scarcade event at the South Charleston Community Center in South Charleston, West Virginia, West Virginia Mountaineers punter Pat McAfee competed in a one-off match which he fought against a wrestler known as Warpig. This would be his only professional wrestling match he competed in until 2020.

On May 12, 2010, IWA East Coast crowned their first tag team champion when they held a tournament for the titles at their You've Gotta Have A Lot Of... event in Nitro, West Virginia in which TJ Phillips and Trik Nasty were crowned the first IWA East Coast Tag Team champions after they defeated the Irish Airborne (Jake Crist and Dave Crist).

On June 21, 2021, IWA East Coast held what would prove to be their final events as they held a joint show wit Girl Fight Wrestling (GFW) and later on the same night, held the final Masters of Pain tournament at Skateland in Charleston, West Virginia. with the main events being Billie Starkz vs. Judy Hendrix and Akira vs. Nolan Edward respectively.

On December 27, 2025 a GoFundMe campaign was created for fans to support former IWA East Coast promoter Michael Tawney who had been suffering from End Stage Renal Failure.

== Championships ==
Championship	Final champion(s)	Date won	Days held	Location
IWA East Coast Heavyweight Championship	Matt Conard	July 11, 2020	N/A	Milton, West Virginia
IWA East Coast Tag Team Championship	Crash Jaxon and Shane Kryzak	July 11, 2020	N/A	Milton, West Virginia
