= IWA Mid-South Hardcore Championship =

Professional wrestling championship

Details
- Promotion: IWA Mid-South
- Date established: April 15, 1999
- Date retired: March 4, 2000
Statistics
- First champion(s): Mad Man Pondo
- Most reigns: 2 Tuff Tony
- Longest reign: 2 Tuff Tony (271 days)
- Shortest reign: Mad Man Pondo (1 day)

The IWA Mid-South Hardcore Championship was a short-lived title in the IWA Mid-South promotion based in Louisville, Kentucky. The title first appeared in 1999, when Mad Man Pondo defeated "The Human Wrecking Ball" Pete Madden (who brought the title with him to the IWA (any lineage and history of the title before this date is unknown). The title was in use until March 4, 2000, when the IWA Mid-South Heavyweight Champion 2 Tuff Tony defeated both Mad Man Pondo and the Hardcore Champion Delilah Starr in a three-way title unification Fans Bring the Weapons match.

== Title history ==
Wrestler:	Times:	Date:	Place:	Notes:
Mad Man Pondo	1	April 15, 1999	Salem, Indiana	Defeated Pete Madden, earlier title lineage (if any) unknown
2 Tuff Tony	1	April 29, 1999	Salem, Indiana	
Mad Man Pondo	2	May 14, 1999	Tell City, Indiana	
2 Tuff Tony	2	May 15, 1999	Bloomington, Indiana	
Delilah Starr	1	February 9, 2000	Charlestown, Indiana	
2 Tuff Tony	3	March 4, 2000	Charlestown, Indiana	Defeated Delilah Starr and Mad Man Pondo in a Fans Bring the Weapons match to unify the Hardcore and Heavyweight Championships

== See also ==
- Independent Wrestling Association Mid-South
