= Bloodymania III =

2009 Juggalo Championship Wrestling event

- Promotion: Juggalo Championship Wrestling
- Date: August 9, 2009
- City: Cave-In-Rock, Illinois
- Venue: Hogrock Campground

Bloodymania chronology
← Previous; Bloodymania II	Next → Bloodymania IV

Bloodymania III was a professional wrestling event produced by Juggalo Championship Wrestling (JCW), which took place at midnight on August 9, 2009 at Hog Rock in Cave-In-Rock, Illinois. Professional wrestling is a type of sports entertainment in which theatrical events are combined with a competitive sport. The buildup to the matches and the scenarios that took place before, during, and after the event, were planned by JCW's script writers. The event starred wrestlers from Juggalo Championship Wrestling, as well as guest wrestlers from the independent circuit. Unlike the first two events, Bloodymania III did not feature a buildup from a season of JCW's SlamTV! internet wrestling show. Instead, half of the feuds were rooted in previous years, while others were built up through live events or were not built up at all.

Eight matches were held on the event's card. The main event match was a 10-man Tag Team match that featured Juggalo World Order (Corporal Robinson, Scott Hall, Shaggy 2 Dope, Violent J, and Sid Vicious) defeat the team of "Holy" Trent Acid and the Alter Boys (Tim, Tom, Terry, and Todd). Featured matches on the undercard included a "Loser leaves JCW" match with special guest referee Terry Funk where Viscera defeated 2 Tuff Tony, Abdullah the Butcher's Retirement match which saw Abdullah and The Rude Boy fight to a no contest, a Raven's Rules match in which Sabu defeated Raven, and a Tag Team match for the JCW Tag Team Championship which saw The Weedman and Billy Bong defeat the champions The Thomaselli Brothers (Brandon and Vito Thomaselli) to become new JCW Tag Team Champions.

== Background ==
Bloodymania III featured professional wrestling matches that involved different wrestlers from pre-existing scripted feuds, plots, and storylines that were played out on SlamTV!, Juggalo Championship Wrestling's (JCW) internet program. Wrestlers were portrayed as either a villain or a hero as they followed a series of events that built tension, and culminated into a wrestling match or series of matches. The event featured wrestlers from JCW's SlamTV!.

The predominant rivalry for the show was a confrontation between the Juggalo World Order (Corporal Robinson, Scott Hall, Shaggy 2 Dope, Violent J, and Sid Vicious) and the team of the late "Holy" Trent Acid and the Alter Boys (Tim, Tom, Terry, and Todd). During the first season of SlamTV!, Trent Acid cut a series of promos against the Juggalo fanbase, the company, and Insane Clown Posse (real-life owners of JCW). While continuing to badmouth the company in the following weeks, Acid had confrontations with several heroes of the company and friends of Insane Clown Posse (Shaggy 2 Dope and Violent J). At West Side Wars, Acid defeated JCW Heavyweight Champion Corporal Robinson to become the new heavyweight champion. However, he later lost the title to Robinson at East Side Wars. At Bloodymania, Insane Clown Posse and Sabu defeated Trent Acid and The Young Alter Boys.

The Rude Boy and Abdullah the Butcher had been involved in a staged rivalry since the inception of Juggalo Championship Wrestling in 1999. At the company's first event, the two fought in a bloody match that ended when Abdullah delivered an elbow drop to the Rude Boy for the victory. The following year, both men wrestled another bloody brawl in a steel cage match which saw Abdullah pin the Rude Boy with an elbow drop. Following the match, Abdullah hung the Rude Boy from the steel cage with a rope. In their third meeting, Abdullah seemed to have ensured a victory after beating the Rude Boy down for most of the match. However, the Rude Boy came back with several stabs to Abdullah's head and groin with scissors. The two battled back and forth before the match was stopped and ruled a no contest.

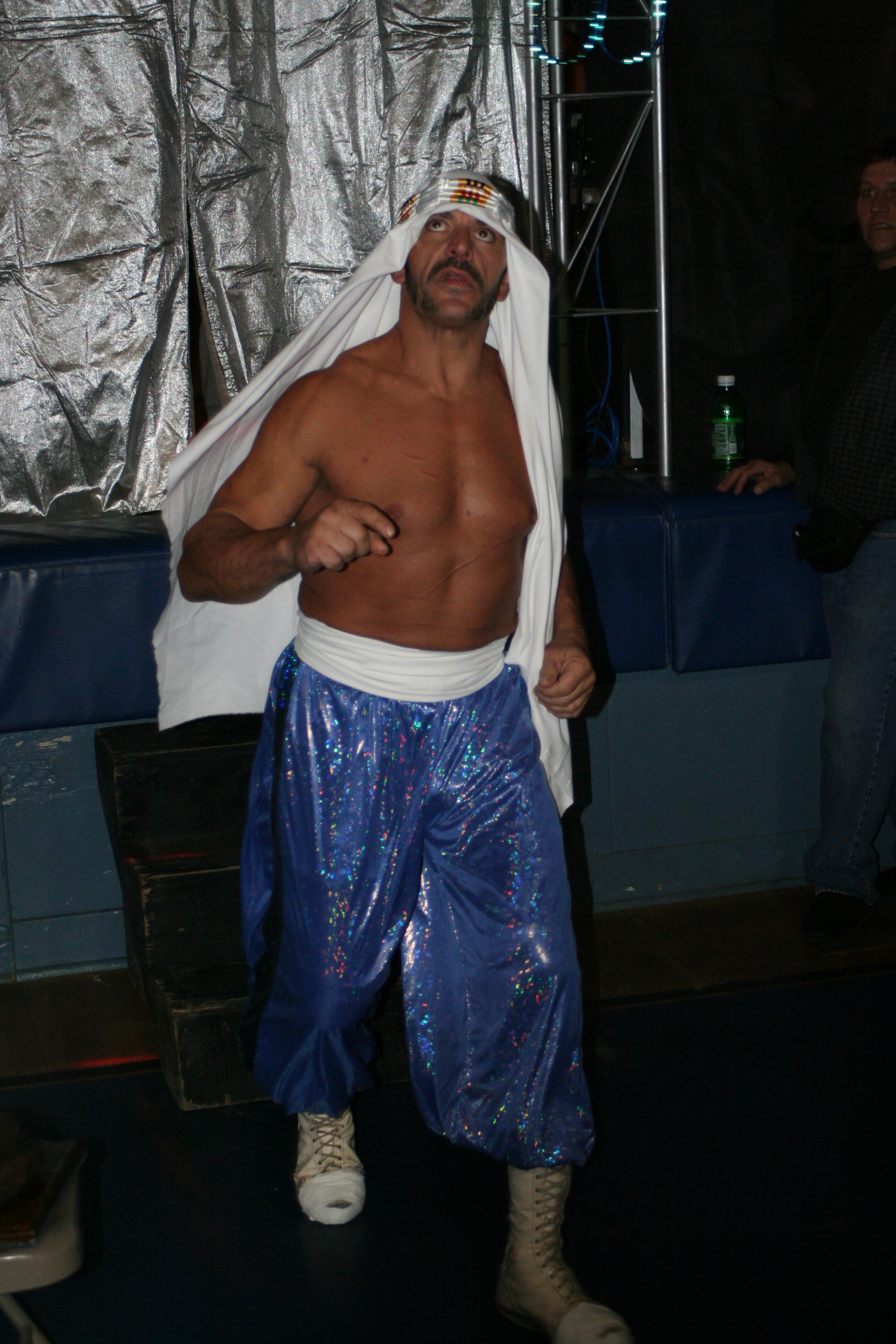
Sabu walking to the ring.

During the second season of SlamTV!, Raven had stolen JCW Heavyweight Champion Corporal Robinson's championship belt. In the third episode, Raven's lackey Sexy Slim Goody knocked Robinson out, per storyline, and Raven began to shave Robinson's afro. Sabu appeared from out of the crowd and scared Raven off. Raven and Goody teamed up against Robinson and Sabu in the following episode, but Raven fled from the match. At Bloodymania II, Raven lost to Robinson in a "Loser leaves JCW" Ladder match. However, it was announced that Raven would return to the company to face his old nemesis Sabu at Bloodymania III in a Raven's Rules match, a match in which there are no disqualifications. Several different managers were announced for the wrestlers, including Sabu being managed by either Evil Dead or Tommy Rich and Raven being managed by Sexy Slim Goody, but the final match saw Raven being managed by Tommy Rich and Sabu coming out alone.

== Event ==
Kevin Nash legitimately no-showed the event and was replaced by Sid Vicious in his match. Nash's current employer, Total Nonstop Action Wrestling, would not allow him to compete in the event. Vampiro was originally scheduled to wrestle, but was unable to compete due to a recent back injury. "Rowdy" Roddy Piper was unable to appear due to a serious illness and was replaced with Terry Funk.

=== Preliminary matches ===
The first preliminary match saw Mad Man Pondo defeat Heidenreich. In the next match, the team of The Weedman and Billy Bong defeated The Thomaselli Brothers (Brandon and Vito Thomaselli) to become new JCW Tag Team Champions. Dan Severn was revealed as special guest referee in the following match where Ken Shamrock defeated Jimmy Jacobs, who was accompanied by Scott D'Amore.

Raven was managed by Tommy Rich in his match against Sabu. At one point in the match, Raven was leaning in the corner when Sabu began to run toward him. Raven pulled the referee in front of him while Sabu jumped forward and landed a body splash, knocking down the referee. When Sabu locked Raven into a Camel Clutch, Rich ran into the ring and, after acting as if he was going to attack Sabu, turned on Raven and punched him in the face. Later in the match, Sabu set Raven on top of a table, climbed to the top rope, and performed a leg drop; however, the table did not break. After Raven recovered, he set Sabu up onto the table and climbed to the top rope. Raven dove toward Sabu with his elbow cocked. Sabu moved out of the way, forcing Raven through the table. Sabu then pinned Raven for the victory.

In the next match, Abdullah The Butcher and The Rude Boy fought to a No Contest in Abdullah's Retirement match. In the sixth match, Butterbean defeated Bull Pain in a Tough Man Match, a match where Butterbean won by knocking Bull Pain down for a ten count. In the final preliminary match of the night, 2 Tuff Tony fought Viscera in a "Loser leaves JCW" match with special guest referee Terry Funk. Viscera pinned 2 Tuff Tony after Balls Mahoney attacked Tony, banning Tony from performing in Juggalo Championship Wrestling from then after.

=== Main event matches ===
In the main event of the night, Juggalo World Order (Corporal Robinson, Scott Hall, Shaggy 2 Dope, Violent J, and Sid Vicious) defeated "Holy" Trent Acid and the Alter Boys (Tim, Tom, Terry, and Todd) after Diamond Dallas Page appeared wearing a jWo jersey and attacked Acid.

== Aftermath ==
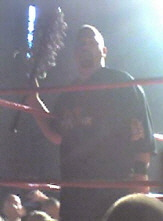
2 Tuff Tony holding a Barbed wire baseball bat.

Two months after being banned from the company, 2 Tuff Tony was reinstated under the condition that he start at the bottom, receive no title matches for several months, and cannot compete at any Bloodymania events. That October at Hallowicked After-Party, he debuted under the name 2 Strong John while wearing a mask and wrestled against Balls Mahoney. At Oddball Bonanza on March 20, 2010, he returned to his normal 2 Tuff Tony persona. On August 15, at Flashlight Wrestling: Hanging with Heros, Tony will face Mahoney with special guest referee Al Snow.

On October 20, 2009, Brandon Thomaselli changed his wrestling name to Pauly Thomaselli. At Hallowicked After-Party, the Thomaselli Brothers defeated The Weedman and Billy Bong to become two time JCW Tag Team Champions. The duo was later renamed The Haters. On June 18, 2010, Trent Acid died.

== Results ==
No.	Results	Stipulations	Times
1	Mad Man Pondo defeated Heidenreich	Singles match	19:38
2	The Weedman and Billy Bong defeated The Thomaselli Brothers (Brandon and Vito Thomaselli) (c)	Tag team match for the JCW Tag Team Championship	5:11
3	Ken Shamrock defeated Jimmy Jacobs (with Scott D’Amore)	Singles match with special guest referee Dan Severn	14:11
4	Sabu defeated Raven (with Tommy Rich)	Raven's Rules match	10:10
5	Abdullah The Butcher vs. The Rude Boy ended in a No Contest	Abdullah's Retirement match	17:16
6	Butterbean defeated Bull Pain	Tough Man Match	18:44
7	Viscera defeated 2 Tuff Tony	"Loser leaves JCW" with special guest referee Terry Funk	11:33
8	Juggalo World Order (Corporal Robinson, Scott Hall, Shaggy 2 Dope, Violent J, and Sid Vicious^{1}) defeated "Holy" Trent Acid and the Alter Boys (Tim, Tom, Terry, and Todd)	Ten-man tag team match	26:17
(c) / – the champion(s) heading into the match

1. Sid Vicious replaced Kevin Nash, who no-showed the event.
