= Bloodymania (2007) =

2007 Juggalo Championship Wrestling event

- Promotion: Juggalo Championship Wrestling
- Date: August 12, 2007
- City: Cave-In-Rock, Illinois
- Venue: Hogrock Campground
- Attendance: approx. 5,800

Juggalo Championship Wrestling event chronology
← Previous; Tempest Release Party Tour	Next → Evansville Invasion

Bloodymania chronology
← Previous; First	Next → Bloodymania II

Bloodymania was a professional wrestling event produced by Juggalo Championship Wrestling (JCW), which took place at midnight on August 12, 2007 at Hogrock Campground in Cave-In-Rock, Illinois. Professional wrestling is a type of sports entertainment in which theatrical events are combined with a competitive sport. The buildup to the matches and the scenarios that took place before, during, and after the event, were planned by JCW's script writers. The event starred wrestlers from JCW's SlamTV! internet wrestling show, as well as guest wrestlers from the independent circuit, Ring of Honor (ROH), IWA Mid-South, and All Japan Pro Wrestling (AJPW). The event was the first produced under the Bloodymania name.

Eight matches were held on the event's card, which featured a supercard, a scheduling of more than one main event. The first of these matches was an 8 Team Tag-Team Elimination match for the JCW Tag Team Championship, which was won by Mad Man Pondo and Necro Butcher. The second main event match was a Hardcore Match for the JCW Heavyweight Championship that featured the champion, Corporal Robinson, defeating Scott Hall to retain the title. The third was a Six Man Tag Team match which saw the team of Insane Clown Posse (Violent J and Shaggy 2 Dope) and Sabu defeat Trent Acid and The Young Alter Boys. Featured matches on the undercard included a Louisville Slugger Match between 2 Tuff Tony and Bull Pain. A match between CJ O'Doyle and Kamala was also scheduled, but never occurred.

The event had an attendance of 5,800, and was released on DVD on October 30, 2007. The video, SlamTV! Part 2 (featuring episodes 10-15 including East Side Wars and Bloodymania), also featured the second half of the first season of SlamTV!.

== Background ==
Bloodymania featured professional wrestling matches that involved different wrestlers from pre-existing scripted feuds, plots, and storylines that were played out on SlamTV!, Juggalo Championship Wrestling's (JCW) internet program. Wrestlers were portrayed as either a villain or a hero as they followed a series of events that built tension, and culminated into a wrestling match or series of matches. The event featured wrestlers from JCW's SlamTV!.

The predominant rivalry for the show was a confrontation between the team of Insane Clown Posse (Violent J and Shaggy 2 Dope) and Trent Acid, rooted on the first episode of SlamTV!. Trent Acid, the self-proclaimed "Savior of JCW", debuted in the promotion by cutting a promo against the Juggalo fanbase, the company, and Insane Clown Posse (real-life owners of JCW). While continuing to badmouth the company in the following weeks, Acid had confrontations with several heroes of the company and friends of Insane Clown Posse. On the final episode of the season, Shaggy 2 Dope announced that he would return to wrestling after being out for 15 months due to a legitimate neck injury which required surgery. Shaggy stated that he, Violent J, and friend Sabu would team up to take on Trent Acid and The Young Alter Boys (Alter Boy 1 and Alter Boy 4) in a Six Man Tag Team match at Bloodymania.

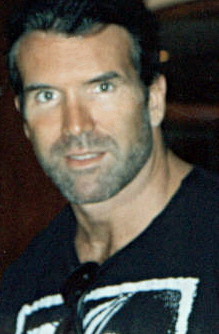
Scott Hall walking to the ring.

Corporal Robinson came into SlamTV! as JCW Heavyweight Champion, and began the season searching for a worthy contender for his championship. In the fourth episode, Trent Acid won a 10 Man Battle Royal to become the number one contender for Robinson's championship. At West Side Wars, Acid pinned Robinson after using the championship belt as a weapon, and became the new JCW Heavyweight Champion. Corporal Robinson received a rematch at East Side Wars in a Steel Cage Match, and regained the championship after performing a Diving leg drop through a table off the top of the cage. On the final episode of the season, it was announced that Robinson would face off against WWC Universal Heavyweight Champion Scott Hall in a hardcore match at Bloodymania.

On the first episode of SlamTV!, Insane Clown Posse (owners of JCW, and then-Tag Team champions) announced that they had stripped themselves of the JCW Tag Team Championship due to the titles not being defended in over a year. The vacating of the titles caused several tag teams to emerge. Mad Man Pondo and Necro Butcher dominated competition all season, establishing themselves as top contenders for the vacant tag team titles. Newcomers Zach Gowen and Human Tornado formed the tag team the Pimp & Gimp Connection and made an immediate impact, earning themselves a spot in the title match. Later, it was announced that the championship would be contested in an eight team tag-team elimination match featuring tag teams of the past and present. Other teams announced for the match included The Bad Breed (Axl and Ian Rotten), The Original Dream Team (Brutus Beefcake and Greg Valentine), The Headshrinkers (Samu and Alofa), Team All Japan (Brute Issei and Akira Raijin), The Basham Brothers (Doug Basham and The Damaja), and Tito and Jorge Santana.

Nosawa is nicknamed the "Japanese Juggalo Sensation."

Nosawa was a main veteran hero with considerable success in JCW. However, he started off SlamTV! with a string of losses, losing all of his first five matches. After receiving a letter from his storyline mentor The Great Muta, stating that Muta was coming to check up on his pupil, Nosawa gained confidence and began a winning streak. At "East Side Wars", Muta teamed with Nosawa to help him defeat the team of Mad Man Pondo and Necro Butcher. Nosawa continued his winning streak into episode 14, where he was assaulted after his match by Justin Credible. On the following episode, Nosawa interfered in Credible's match by spitting Asian mist into his eyes. A match was then set for Nosawa and The Great Muta to face Justin Credible and his mystery partner at Bloodymania.

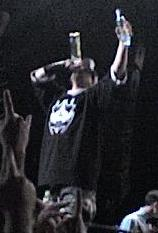
2 Tuff Tony drinking his signature Bacardi.

2 Tuff Tony had been involved in a scripted rivalry with Tracy Smothers when, as part of the storyline, Smothers was arrested and forced off the rest of the tour. The following weeks saw Tony taking on various opponents. At "East Side Wars" he was attacked after his match by Bull Pain, who hit him multiple times with a metal baseball bat. After the assault, Pain placed Tony on a table and proceeded to leap off stage, driving Tony through the table. While Tony was out injured as part of the storyline, Pain continued to beat opponents mercilessly using the metal baseball bat he called Brother Pain. On the final episode of the season, it was announced that 2 Tuff Tony would take on Bull Pain at Bloodymania in a Louisville Slugger match, where it is legal to use baseball bats as weapons.

== Event ==
=== Preliminary matches ===
The first match that occurred was a standard match between Último Dragón and Jimmy Jacobs, who was accompanied to the ring by Scott D'Amore. At one point, D'Amore interfered in the match and Jacobs attempted to suplex Último. Dragón reversed the move and hit a spinning back kick to Jacobs' gut. He then pinned Jacobs after performing his finisher Asai DDT, a move in which he applied a three-quarter facelock on Jacobs, performed a backflip, then landed in a kneeling position, driving Jacobs' head back-first down to the mat. The next match was a Triple Threat featuring Pogo the Clown, Jake Roberts, and Abdullah the Butcher. After knocking Abdullah unconscious outside of the ring, Pogo reversed Roberts' finisher DDT by ramming him into the corner. Pogo then landed an Elbow Drop and pinned Roberts for the victory.

2 Tuff Tony and Bull Pain then fought in a Louisville Slugger match. When Bull Pain climbed to the top rope, Tony punched him and wrapped his legs around Pain's head then performed a backflip, forcing Pain into a somersault. During a brawl outside of the ring, Tony threw Bull Pain through a table that was held up by members of the audience. After laying Pain onto another set up table, Tony climbed to the top rope and dove toward him, spinning 360° before landing stomach first across Pain, breaking him through the table. Tony gained the pinfall after he hit The Meteorite, a move in which Tony poured alcohol on his right glove, lit it on fire with a lighter, and punched Pain in the face.

In the following tag team match, Justin Credible and 2 Cold Scorpio took on Nosawa and The Great Muta. When Nosawa attempted to deliver a running knee to Scorpio's head, Scorpio blocked the move and hit Nosawa with a spinning kick to the face. After knocking Muta off of the apron, Scorpio kicked Nosawa in face, then Credible lifted Nosawa upside down and knelt down to drop his head to the mat with That's Incredible!. Scorpio hit a diving moonsault for the pinfall. After the match, Muta spit Asian mist in Nosawa's face and delivered his finisher Shining Wizard. In the final preliminary match, Tracy Smothers challenged any wrestler in the company. Ron Killings answered the challenge, running to the ring and hitting Smothers with a corkscrew flying forearm smash. Killings then finished Smothers with a corkscrew scissors kick for the win.

=== Main event matches ===
The first main event of the night was an 8 Team Tag-Team Elimination match for the JCW Tag Team Championship. Early on, Necro Butcher pinned Greg Valentine with a Sunset flip, eliminating The Original Dream Team. Following a series of tags, Samu and Alofa hit Axl Rotten with a Double falling headbutt for the pin. Quickly after, Tito Santana pinned Samu with a Schoolboy. Later, Damaja hit Zach Gowen with Brain Damage, then Doug Basham landed a Diving headbutt and pinned Gowen, eliminating Pimp & Gimp Connection. After another series of tags, Brute Issei eliminated the team of Tito and Jorge Santana following an STO on Jorge. Issei then agreed to a partnership with The Basham Brothers, but Doug quickly turned on him and landed the Last Impression to eliminate Team All Japan. In the final minutes, Doug attempted a Sunset flip on Mad Man Pondo, but Pondo counted and hit him with the Stop Sign Smash for the victory.

The second main event featured JCW Heavyweight Champion Corporal Robinson defending the title against Scott Hall. Hall took early control of the match with pokes to Robinson's eyes and slaps to his head. The match continued in Hall's favor for several minutes until Robinson rolled out of the ring and performed a rope-aided jawbreaker. As Hall was down, Robinson brought a tray full of thumbtacks into the ring. Hall attacked Robinson from behind, then placed him on the top turnbuckle and performed a super back suplex. He then attempted to hit his signature Razor's Edge by placing Robinson's head between his thighs, but Robinson countered with a forearm to the groin. After another attack to the groin and an eye poke, Robinson locked in a Cobra clutch and hooked his foot behind Hall's leg before throwing himself backwards, forcing Hall backwards into the tray of thumbtacks for the win.

The final main event was a Six Man Tag Team match between Insane Clown Posse and Sabu and the team of Trent Acid and The Young Alter Boys, who were accompanied by Annie Social the Nun. Shaggy 2 Dope wrestled for the first time in 15 months, delivering multiple stiff punches to Alter Boy 4 and performing several moves. When Sabu was tagged in against Trent Acid, he bounced off of the ropes and wrapped his leg around Acid's head. He set up a chair and attempted to jump off of it onto the ropes, but Acid tripped Sabu with his foot, causing Sabu to hit the chair head first. Later in the match, Violent J was kicked in the face by Acid. Both Alter Boys proceeded to attack Violent J with punches and clotheslines. Sabu entered the ring and threw a steel chair into Acid and both Alter Boys' faces. He then began smoking a legitimate blunt called the "Magic Blunt." After Violent J smoked the blunt, he became revitalized and clotheslined Acid and both Alter Boys. Sabu slammed Acid down to the mat, while Violent J climbed to the top rope and hit a diving moonsault. Shaggy 2 Dope then delivered a diving leg drop from the top rope before Sabu delivered another diving leg drop with a steel chair and pinned Acid for the victory.

== Aftermath ==
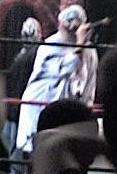
Boondox rapping in the ring.

Along with Violent J, Corporal Robinson and Scott Hall formed the Juggalo World Order at Evansville Invasion. In the proceeding months, Shaggy 2 Dope, Nosawa, 2 Tuff Tony, Kevin Nash, Sid Vicious, and Diamond Dallas Page were all inducted as members. At Bloodymania III, the group continued the rivalry between Insane Clown Posse and Trent Acid, and defeated him and The Alter Boys in a 10-man Tag Team match. Mad Man Pondo and Necro Butcher held the JCW Tag Team Championship for half a year, but Butcher left the company for Ring of Honor, forcing the company to book a title change. Breyer Wellington replaced Necro Butcher, and he and Mad Man Pondo lost the titles to Violent J and 2 Tuff Tony at Evansville Invasion. The titles were later vacated, and the company held the "SlamTV! Tag Team Title Tournament" during the second season of SlamTV! to find the top two contending teams. At Bloodymania II, the Bloody Brothers (Ian and Lane Bloody) defeated Human Tornado and The Weedman to become JCW Tag Team Champions.

The rivalry between 2 Tuff Tony and Bull Pain halted, and Tony continued his staged rivalry with Tracy Smothers. The two battled throughout the second season of SlamTV!, and met in a tag team match at Bloodymania II where Tony and Boondox defeated Smothers and Bull Pain. Nosawa's rivalry with Justin Credible also ended, as Nosawa soon began working full-time for All Japan Pro Wrestling. Scott D'Amore continued to bring in new wrestlers in a storyline attempt to reform the company. During the second season of SlamTV!, he managed Kowabata and Conrad Kennedy, and at Bloodymania III he managed Jacobs again in a loss to Ken Shamrock.

== Results ==
Other on-screen personnel
Role:	Name:
Commentators	Violent J (as Diamond Donovan Douglas)
Commentators	Shaggy 2 Dope (as Harvey "Gweedo" Guestella)

No.	Results	Stipulations	Times
1	Último Dragón defeated Jimmy Jacobs (with Scott D'Amore)	Singles match	7:27
2	Pogo the Clown defeated Jake Roberts and Abdullah the Butcher	Triple threat match	1:06
3	2 Tuff Tony defeated Bull Pain	Louisville Slugger match	12:43
4	Justin Credible and 2 Cold Scorpio defeated Nosawa and The Great Muta	Tag team match	7:57
5	Ron Killings defeated Tracy Smothers	Singles match	1:02
6	Mad Man Pondo and Necro Butcher defeated Pimp & Gimp Connection (Zach Gowen and Human Tornado), The Bad Breed (Axl and Ian Rotten), The Original Dream Team (Brutus Beefcake and Greg Valentine), The Headshrinkers (Samu and Alofa), Team All Japan (Brute Issei and Akira Raijin), The Basham Brothers (Doug Basham and The Damaja), and Tito and Jorge Santana	Eight-team tag team elimination match for the vacant JCW Tag Team Championship	21:48
7	Corporal Robinson (c) defeated Scott Hall	Hardcore match for the JCW Heavyweight Championship	10:09
8	Insane Clown Posse (Violent J and Shaggy 2 Dope) and Sabu defeated Trent Acid and The Young Altar Boys (Young Altar Boy #1 and Young Altar Boy #4) (with Annie Social the Nun)	Six-man tag team match	11:33
(c) / – the champion(s) heading into the match

8 Team Tag-Team Elimination match

Elimination	Wrestler	Team	Eliminated by	Elimination move	Time
1	Greg Valentine	The Original Dream Team	Necro Butcher	Pinfall after a Sunset flip	2:09
2	Axl Rotten	Bad Breed	Samu and Alofa	Pinfall after a Double falling headbutt	6:18
3	Samu	The Headshrinkers	Tito Santana	Pinfall after a Schoolboy	8:04
4	Zach Gowen	Pimp & Gimp Connection	Doug Basham	Pinfall after a Diving headbutt	11:17
5	Jorge Santana	Tito and Jorge Santana	Brute Issei	Pinfall after an STO	12:27
6	Brute Issei	Team All Japan	Doug Basham	Pinfall after the Last Impression	18:45
7	Doug Basham	The Basham Brothers	Mad Man Pondo	Pinfall after the Stop Sign Smash	21:48
Winners:	Mad Man Pondo and Necro Butcher				
