= Juggalo World Order =

- The logo of the Juggalo World Order

Stable
- Members: Violent J 2 Tuff Tony; Willie Mack; EC3; Jeeves; Painful Paul; Sally Boy
- Name: Juggalo World Order
- Billed from: Detroit, Michigan
- Former members: Corporal Robinson; Sid Vicious; Diamond Dallas Page; Scott Hall; Kerry Morton; Kevin Nash; Nosawa; Vampiro; Ruffo the Clown; Sean Waltman; Shaggy 2 Dope; Yabo the Clown
- Debut: October 6, 2007

The Juggalo World Order (commonly known as the jWo or JWO, the official typeset in the logo) is a professional wrestling stable performing for Juggalo Championship Wrestling (JCW), where 2 Tuff Tony and Willie Mack are former JCW World Tag Team Champions in their first recognized reign as a team and individually. The name of the stable is inspired by the New World Order (NWO).

== History ==
=== Background ===
Villainous wrestler Tracy Smothers debuted in the first season of Juggalo Championship Wrestling's internet wrestling show SlamTV! by cutting a series of promos in which he insulted the company, the owners (Insane Clown Posse), and the Juggalo fanbase. It became a common gesture for him to hide behind the curtain and flip off the crowd prior to entering the ring. He flaunted his PWU Hardcore Championship, which he proclaimed the only championship that he respected, while verbally abusing the fans on the mic. On occasion, Smothers would even get in physical altercations with fans.

Tracy ran rampant on JCW, having matches which mostly ended with him choking opponents out. Smothers mercilessly beat opponents by any means necessary, including fan favorites Nosawa and Zach Gowen, the latter being a one-legged wrestler whom Smothers knocked out with his PWU Hardcore Championship and proceeded to choke out before beating up both the referee and security. In the sixth episode, during 2 Tuff Tony's match, Smothers attacked Tony and caused him to be carried out on a stretcher. Just days before Tony's return on the eighth episode, Tracy Smothers was arrested (kayfabe) and dropped from the rest of the tour, leaving Tony and the JCW roster with no way to seek revenge.

JCW Heavyweight Champion, and fan favorite, Corporal Robinson was scheduled to face Tracy Smothers at Evansville Invasion, but he first had to defend his title against tweener Scott Hall at Bloodymania. Hall and Robinson wrestled with a mutual respect for each other. During the match, Hall acted in his signature cocky manner. He delivered pokes to the eyes, slaps to the head, and several homosexual mannerisms, all with a smile on his face. Though the tactics normally result in boos from the crowd, after Robinson won the match, the fans cheered for both him and Hall.

=== Formation ===
The Juggalo World Order at Hallowicked 2007. (in order of left to right) Violent J, Scott Hall, Shaggy 2 Dope, Corporal Robinson, and Nosawa.

On October 6, 2007, an unaired event entitled Evansville Invasion took place in Evansville, Indiana. In the main event, Corporal Robinson took on Tracy Smothers, before being attacked by both him and Sid Vicious. Violent J and Scott Hall came down to the ring to defend Robinson. After scaring both Smothers and Vicious away, the trio ripped off their initial jerseys to reveal shirts which read "JWO."

On October 31, at the Hallowicked After Party in Detroit, Michigan, Shaggy 2 Dope was introduced as a member of the group. Later that night, the jWo (Scott Hall and Corporal Robinson) defeated "Richie Boy" Breyer Wellington, Joe Doering, and Conrad Kennedy III in a handicapped match with special guest referee Nosawa. Following the match, Nosawa ripped off his referee shirt to reveal that he was the newest member of the jWo.

On December 21, Juggalo Championship Wrestling held an event called Big Ballas' X-Mas Party. The main event featured The jWo (Violent J, Nosawa, and Scott Hall) vs. The Thomaselli Brothers. This match marked Scott Hall's first wrestling appearance since no-showing the TNA PPV Turning Point and several WWC shows.

=== Adding members ===
Kevin Nash and Scott Hall appeared as a team at Bloodymania II, both wearing jWo jerseys. Prior to their match, Nash proclaimed that he was a member of the Juggalo World Order. That night, the duo defeated the Thomaselli Brothers.

On October 31, 2008, at the Hallowicked After Party in Detroit, the Juggalo World Order (Scott Hall, Shaggy 2 Dope, Violent J, and Corporal Robinson) interfered in the opening match, beating up both wrestlers as well as the referee. Violent J got on the microphone and called 2 Tuff Tony down to the ring. He then asked 2 Tuff Tony to join the jWo, before Tony responded by explaining that he was a one-man team. Mid sentence, Tony stopped and exclaimed, "Fuck That! I wanna roll with the jWo!" Violent J then gave 2 Tuff Tony a Hallowicked version of the jWo jersey, before announcing him as an official member of the Juggalo World Order.

At Bloodymania III, the Juggalo World Order (Corporal Robinson, Scott Hall, Kevin Nash, Shaggy 2 Dope, and Violent J) was scheduled to face "Holy" Trent Acid and the Alter Boys (Tim, Tom, Terry, and Todd) in the main event. However, Kevin Nash legitimately no-showed the event. After Hall explained to the crowd that he and Nash had split, Sid Vicious was introduced as his replacement and as the newest member of the jWo. During the end of their match, Diamond Dallas Page ran into the ring wearing a jWo jersey and hit Acid with the Diamond Cutter, allowing Violent J to get the pin.

On May 26, 2012 at JCW's Hatchet Attacks 2012 iPPV, the JWO made their return to JCW, represented by Kevin Nash and Sean Waltman. The duo would go on to defeat Mosh and Thrasher of the Headbangers.

=== Invasions ===
On the November 4 edition of the radio show "The Main Event", Scott Hall dared hosts Violent J, 2 Tuff Tony, and Corporal Robinson to "take [the Juggalo World Order] on the road" by "invading" Total Nonstop Action Wrestling, World Wrestling Entertainment, and Ultimate Fighting Championship.

On November 9, Scott Hall, Shaggy 2 Dope, Violent J, 2 Tuff Tony, and Corporal Robinson "invaded" TNA's PPV Turning Point by purchasing front row tickets to the event. They proceeded to promote their faction by flashing their jWo jerseys, which each member had on. As the crowd grew rowdy from the appearance, TNA management became worried that the group may interfere in a match. Backstage, many wrestlers were prepared for a fight with the group. Samoa Joe personally feared that, due to his negative comments toward Scott Hall, the jWo would interfere in his match that night with Kevin Nash. During his match, Sheik Abdul Bashir, friend of both 2 Tuff Tony and Corporal Robinson, spit outside of the ring onto Tony, resulting in Tony splashing beer in the ring. Afterwards, Bashir went ringside and slapped and shoved Robinson. TNA, not knowing the three were friends, saw this as a potentially volatile situation and decided to remove the Juggalo World Order from the building.

Two days later, on the November 11 edition "The Main Event", Scott Hall expressed interest in a Ring of Honor invasion, in addition to the previously mentioned UFC invasion. The Juggalo World Order also showed interest in "invading" WWE at its 2009 Royal Rumble PPV (which happened in their hometown Detroit, Michigan), but were unable due to filming commitments for Big Money Rustlas in Los Angeles.

== Members ==
- Violent J
- 2 Tuff Tony
- Willie Mack
- EC3
- Jeeves
- Painful Paul
- Sally Boy

=== Former members ===
- Corporal Robinson
- Sid Vicious
- Diamond Dallas Page
- Scott Hall
- Kerry Morton
- Kevin Nash
- Sean Waltman
- Vampiro
- Nosawa
- Shaggy 2 Dope
- Yabo the Clown
- Ruffo the Clown

== Championships and accomplishments ==
- Juggalo Championship Wrestling
  - JCW Heavyweight Championship (8 times) – Corporal Robinson (2) and 2 Tuff Tony (6)
  - JCW World Tag Team Championship (1 time) – 2 Tuff Tony and Willie Mack
