= Bloodymania II =

2008 Juggalo Championship Wrestling event

- Promotion: Juggalo Championship Wrestling
- Date: August 10, 2008
- City: Cave-In-Rock, Illinois
- Venue: Hogrock Campground

Bloodymania chronology
← Previous; Bloodymania	Next → Bloodymania III

Bloodymania II was a professional wrestling event produced by Juggalo Championship Wrestling (JCW), which took place at midnight on August 10, 2008, at Hogrock Campground in Cave-In-Rock, Illinois. Professional wrestling is a type of sports entertainment in which theatrical events are combined with a competitive sport. The buildup to the matches and the scenarios that took place before, during, and after the event, were planned by JCW's script writers. The event starred wrestlers from JCW's SlamTV! internet wrestling show, as well as guest wrestlers from the independent circuit.

Six matches were held on the event's card. The main event match was a "Loser leaves JCW" Ladder match for the JCW Heavyweight Championship that featured the champion, Corporal Robinson, defeating Raven to retain the title. Featured matches on the undercard included a tag team bout for the JCW Tag Team Championship in which The Bloody Brothers (Ian and Lane) defeated Human Tornado and The Weedman, and another tag team match that saw 2 Tuff Tony and Boondox defeat Tracy Smothers and Bull Pain.

The event has not been released on video due to "unforeseen legal and contract problems."

== Background ==
Bloodymania II featured professional wrestling matches that involved different wrestlers from pre-existing scripted feuds, plots, and storylines that were played out on SlamTV!, Juggalo Championship Wrestling's (JCW) internet program. Wrestlers were portrayed as either a villain or a hero as they followed a series of events that built tension, and culminated into a wrestling match or series of matches. The event featured wrestlers from JCW's SlamTV!.

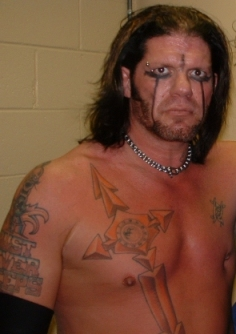
Raven wearing his face paint

The predominant rivalry for the show was a confrontation between the JCW Heavyweight Champion Corporal Robinson and Raven. In the second episode, Robinson defended his title against Sexy Slim Goody. During the match, Raven interfered and hit Robinson with an Evenflow DDT, then stole the JCW Heavyweight Championship belt. The following week, Sexy Slim Goody knocked Robinson out, per storyline, and Raven began to shave Robinson's afro. Sabu appeared from out of the crowd and scared Raven off. Raven and Goody teamed up against Robinson and Sabu in the following episode, but Raven fled from the match with the stolen championship belt. It was later announced that Robinson and Raven would meet in a "Loser leaves JCW" Ladder match, where the title is hung above the ring, and the winner is the contestant who climbs a ladder and retrieves it. The loser would then be banned from competing in JCW.

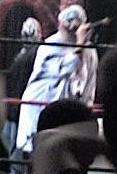
Boondox rapping in the ring

During the first season of SlamTV!, Tracy Smothers attacked hero 2 Tuff Tony and caused him to be carried out on a stretcher as part of the storyline. Just days before Tony's return, Smothers was arrested and dropped from the rest of the tour, in accordance with the scripted events, leaving Tony with no way to seek revenge. In the first episode of season two, both men faced off in a match which saw Tracy win after a fast count by the referee, who, as part of the storyline, was later revealed as Tracy's illegitimate daughter, Isabella. Two weeks later, Tracy caught Isabella listening to Boondox, the rapper who sings 2 Tuff Tony's entrance music. The following week, 2 Tuff Tony attacked Tracy after his match. Tracy later caught Isabella engaging in sexual actions with Boondox, through storyline, and assaulted him. The next week it was announced that Tracy and Isabella Smothers would face Boondox and 2 Tuff Tony at Bloodymania II.

It was announced in the first episode of the season that, due to Necro Butcher signing with Ring of Honor, he and Mad Man Pondo had been stripped of the JCW Tag Team Championship. Eight tag teams were introduced to participate in the "SlamTV! Tag Team Title Tournament." The final two teams would face each other at Bloodymania II. The Weedman and Billy Bong defeated The Bumpin Uglies, The Bloody Brothers (Ian and Lane Bloody) defeated The Ring Rydas, The Bashums defeated Leatherface and Jason, and Zach Gowen and Conrad "Lights Out" Kennedy defeated The Thomaselli Brothers (Vito and Brandon Thomaselli) all to advance to the semi-finals. The Weedman and Billy Bong defeated The Bashums, and The Bloody Brothers defeated Zach Gowen and Conrad Kennedy to advance to the finals.

== Event ==
Bloodymania II featured several legitimate no-shows including Brian Knobs, Jerry Sags, Chris Masters, Trevor Murdoch, Zach Gowen, and Goldust. Isabella Smothers was unable to compete due to a knee injury; she was replaced with Bull Pain in her match.

=== Preliminary matches ===
The first preliminary match saw Gangrel defeated by Sexy Slim Goody. In the next match, Mad Man Pondo and Abdullah The Butcher fought to a no contest. The Weedman was intended to team with Billy Bong in the following match against The Bloody Brothers (Ian and Lane). However, because Zach Gowen legitimately no-showed the event, Bong did not receive a ride to the event. Instead, Bong was replaced with Human Tornado. The Bloody Brothers defeated The Weedman and Human Tornado to become new JCW Tag Team Champions. Piper's Pit took place in the middle of the ring with host "Rowdy" Roddy Piper. Scott D'Amore was the guest, and he insulted Piper, the crowd, and the promotion. After being shoved multiple times, Piper locked D'Amore into a sleeper hold.

In the fourth match, 2 Tuff Tony and Boondox fought against Tracy Smothers and Bull Pain, who was replacing an injured Isabella Smothers. Tony and Boondox won the match after they both hit The Meteorite, a move in which they poured alcohol on their right gloves, lit them on fire with a lighter, and punched Smothers and Pain in the face. Before the final preliminary match, Scott Hall and Kevin Nash came out and announced that Nash was the newest member of the Juggalo World Order. The duo then defeated the Thomaselli Brothers (Sal and Vito Thomaselli) after Hall placed Sal between his legs, lifted him into a cross position, then threw him onto the mat back first and Nash placed Vito between his legs, lifted him into the air, then dropped him onto the mat back first.

=== Main event matches ===
The main event of the night was a "Loser leaves JCW" Ladder match for the JCW Heavyweight Championship between champion Corporal Robinson and Raven, who was accompanied by Sexy Slim Goody. At one point, Goody attempted to attack Robinson, but instead accidentally speared Raven. Robinson then locked in a Cobra clutch and hooked his foot behind Goody's leg before throwing himself backwards, forcing Goody backwards into the mat. Robinson then performed the same move to Raven, climbed the latter, and won the match.

== Aftermath ==
On October 20, 2008, Lane Bloody retired from professional wrestling. Ian Bloody continued to hold the JCW Tag Team Champions until Hallowicked After-Party 2008 when they were defended without him. The Thomaselli Brothers (Vito and Brandon Thomaselli) defeated The Bump-N-Uglies to become the new JCW Tag Team Champions. Though banned after losing to Robinson, Raven returned to JCW at Bloodymania III in a loss to Sabu. Scott D'Amore continued to bring in new wrestlers in a storyline attempt to reform the company. He managed Jimmy Jacobs at Bloodymania III in a loss to Ken Shamrock. Abdullah the Butcher went on to wrestle in a Retirement match against Rude Boy which ended in a no contest at Bloodymania III. Also at Bloodymania III, Mad Man Pondo defeated Heidenreich.

== Results ==
No.	Results	Stipulations
1	Gangrel defeated by Sexy Slim Goody	Singles match
2	Abdullah The Butcher vs. Mad Man Pondo ended in a no-contest	Singles match
3	The Bloody Brothers (Ian and Lane) defeated Human Tornado and The Weedman	Tag team match for the vacant JCW Tag Team Championship
4	2 Tuff Tony and Boondox defeated Bull Pain^{1} and Tracy Smothers	Tag team match
5	The Juggalo World Order (Scott Hall and Kevin Nash) defeated The Thomaselli Brothers (Sal and Vito Thomaselli)	Tag team match
6	Corporal Robinson (c) defeated Raven	"Loser leaves JCW" Ladder match for the JCW Heavyweight Championship
(c) / – the champion(s) heading into the match

1. Bull Pain replaced the injured Isabella Smothers.
