= 2 Tuff Tony =

American professional wrestler (born 1974)

- Tony in June 2025

Personal information
- Born: Anthony Borcherding; June 6, 1974 (age 52) Louisville, Kentucky, U.S.
- Children: 2

Professional wrestling career
- Ring name(s): 2 Tuff Tony; Hollywood Chuck Hogan
- Billed height: 6 ft 0 in (183 cm)
- Billed weight: 250 lb (113 kg)
- Trained by: The Moondogs
- Debut: May 23, 1996

Anthony Borcherding (born June 6, 1974), better known by his ring name 2 Tuff Tony, is an American professional wrestler and promoter. He currently performs for Juggalo Championship Wrestling (JCW) where he is a six-time JCW Heavyweight Champion, a one-time JCW American Champion, and a one-time JCW World Tag Team Champion and in the independent circuit. He is best known for his hardcore wrestling style. Throughout his professional wrestling career, Tony has wrestled for various wrestling promotions, including Independent Wrestling Association Mid-South, Combat Zone Wrestling (CZW), and Big Japan Pro Wrestling (BJW). He is also the owner of the Grindhouse Pro Wrestling Academy and the Grindhouse Pro Wrestling promotion headquartered at The ArenA in Jeffersonville, Indiana.

In his professional wrestling career, Tony is an eleven-time Heavyweight champion, having won the BBW Wrestling Heavyweight Championship once, ICW Heavyweight Championship once, IWA Mid-South Heavyweight Championship twice, JCW Heavyweight Championship six times, and MRW Heavyweight Championship once. In addition to these championships, he has won the DDT Pro-Wrestling Ironman Heavymetalweight Championship once and IWA Mid-South Hardcore Championship thrice, the latter of which he is the final recognized champion. Tony is also the 2006 IWA Mid-South Double Death Tag Team Tournament winner with Mad Man Pondo. He appeared for Extreme Championship Wrestling between 1996 and 2001, he wrestled various opponent's, like, Pablo Marquez, EZ Money, Doug Furnas, Twiggy Ramirez, Steve Corino and Chris Chetti.

== Professional wrestling career ==
=== Early career (1996–1999) ===
Tony's friends Robert and Jerry traveled to Arkansas to train with professional wrestlers The Moondogs and invited him to come along. After watching several training sessions, Tony was invited into the ring. He soon began training alongside his friends, free of charge, because Moondog Spot felt that Tony "was a natural for the business." Tony started wrestling in Indiana in a small bingo hall, where he first met wrestler Corporal Robinson. He, Robinson, and Mad Man Pondo began traveling throughout the country together. Video distribution company Smart Mark Video helped the trio gain national exposure.

=== Independent Wrestling Association Mid-South (1999–2007) ===
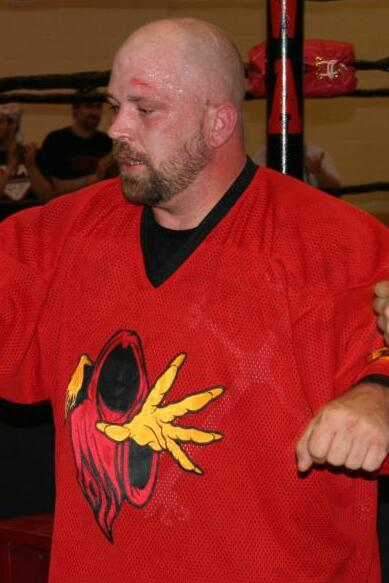
2 Tuff Tony at the 2008 Ted Petty Invitational

Tony began working for Independent Wrestling Association Mid-South (IWA-MS) in 1999. He wrestled his first match against Rolling Hard, where he was introduced to the hardcore wrestling style of the company. Seeing that Tony had never wrestled in the hardcore style before, Mad Man Pondo requested to work with him in matches. The promotion's owner, Ian Rotten, supported the idea and booked the two in a rivalry. Pondo acquainted him to the proper techniques of hardcore wrestling, and Tony later recalled that Pondo "took good care of me" in their matches.

On April 29, 1999, Tony defeated Pondo for the IWA Mid-South Hardcore Championship. He lost the championship on May 14 to Pondo, but won it back the following day. The following February he lost the championship, but won the IWA Mid-South Heavyweight Championship two weeks later. On March 4, he defeated Pondo and Delilah Starr to unify the IWA-MS Hardcore and Heavyweight Championships. Two weeks later, Tony lost the championship. He won it for a second time the following March 2, before losing it to Mitch Page a month later.

In 2006, Tony and Mad Man Pondo took part in the first Double Death Tag Team Tournament, though they were not told which team would win the tournament. They defeated Children of Pain then Dysfunction and Corporal Robinson to make it to the finals. In the finals, Tony and Pondo defeated Tough Crazy Bastards to be crowned the first Double Death Tag Team Tournament champions.

=== Juggalo Championship Wrestling (1999–present) ===
In 1997, Tony wrestled for Insane Clown Posse at the event ICP's Strangle-Mania Live. Two years later, he, Robinson, and Mad Man Pondo wrestled at the Dan Curtis Memorial, an independent wrestling booker who had recently worked for Insane Clown Posse. Several days after the event, Tony, Robinson, and Pondo were booked to wrestle for Insane Clown Posse's first Juggalo Championship Wrestling show. Video of the event was later released nationally. Tony continued wrestling for Juggalo Championship Wrestling, including matches at the Gathering of the Juggalos festivals and two other videos released by the company.

Tony went on tour with JCW in 2007 to film the internet wrestling show SlamTV!, where he was involved in a rivalry with Tracy Smothers. Tracy attacked Tony in the sixth episode, causing Tony to be knocked out of action for several weeks. Per storyline, Smothers was arrested just days before Tony's return on the eighth episode, leaving Tony with no way to seek revenge. Tony was attacked by Bull Pain at East Side Wars, but later defeated him in a Louisville Slugger match at Bloodymania. On January 26, 2008, Tony and Violent J won the JCW Tag Team Championship. However, their victory was declared void, stricken from the record, and the title was vacated.

Tony continued his rivalry with Tracy Smothers into season two of SlamTV! In the first episode, both men faced off in a match which saw Tracy win after a fast count by the referee, who was later revealed as Tracy's illegitimate daughter, Isabella. Two weeks later, Tracy caught Isabella listening to Boondox, the rapper who sings Tony's entrance music. The following week, Tony attacked Smothers after his match. Tracy later caught Isabella engaging in sexual actions with Boondox, through storyline, and assaulted him. Tracy and Isabella Smothers were then scheduled face Boondox and 2 Tuff Tony at Bloodymania II. However, Isabella was replaced by Bull Pain after she injured her leg, and Smothers and Pain lost to Tony and Boondox.

At the 2008 Hallowicked After-Party, Tony joined the group the Juggalo World Order. On November 9, the Juggalo World Order (Scott Hall, Shaggy 2 Dope, Violent J, 2 Tuff Tony, and Corporal Robinson) "invaded" Total Nonstop Action Wrestling's Turning Point PPV by purchasing front row tickets to the event. They proceeded to promote their faction by flashing their JWO jerseys, which each member had on, before being removed from the building. At Bloodymania III, 2 Tuff Tony was defeated by Viscera in a "Loser leaves JCW" match with Terry Funk as special guest referee due to interference by Balls Mahoney. Tony was reinstated two months later under the conditions that he start at the bottom, receive no title matches for several months, and cannot compete at any Bloodymania events.

That October at Hallowicked After-Party, Tony debuted under the name 2 Strong John while wearing a mask and wrestled against Balls Mahoney. At Oddball Bonanza on March 20, 2010, he wrestled as 2 Tuff Tony to take on "Holy" Trent Acid. During the match, he debuted his newest finisher, an inverted sitout package piledriver which he calls Dick for Dinner. Bloodymania IV saw the team of Balls Mahoney and the masked Hollywood Chuck Hogan defeat the team of Mad Man Pondo and Necro Butcher. Following the match, Hollywood Chuck Hogan unmasked himself to reveal that he was actually 2 Tuff Tony. Tony then attacked Mahoney, leaving him beat down in the middle of the ring.

Tony faced Sabu at the 2011 event Monster's Island. Sabu, who recently aligned himself with villainous manager Charlie Brown, defeated Tony and continued to attack him after the match ended. The two wrestled again at Up in Smoke in a match where Rob Conway was hired by Brown to attack Tony. He and Rhino defeated Sabu and Conway at St. Andrews Brawl, where Tony was later named number one contender for the JCW Heavyweight Championship. At Send in the Clowns, Tony defeated Butler Geeves to become JCW Heavyweight Champion. The following month at Above The Law, Tony lost the championship to Officer Colt Cabana.

At the Hatchet Attacks PPV on May 26, 2012, 2 Tuff Tony defeated Kongo Kong to win the vacant JCW Heavyweight Championship, making him champion for a second time. On October 31, 2013, Tony was defeated by Necro Butcher in a title match. On May 4, 2014, Tony defeated Krimson to win the vacant JCW Heavyweight Championship. On April 19, 2015, Tony was defeated by Weedman in a title match.

2 Tuff appears as himself with former JCW tag partner Corporal Robinson in the underground wrestling documentary Wrestling with Disaster, a feature-length film that highlights an indy wrestling show gone horribly awry. The production is currently streaming at YouTube.com/LegitProWrestling.

On December 16, 2020, Tony defeated Teddy Hart to become a 5 times JCW Heavyweight Champion.

On December 21, 2024, Tony defeated Caleb Konley to become the JCW American Champion.

=== Big Japan Pro Wrestling (2000–2006) ===
Tony was brought to Big Japan Pro Wrestling in 2000 by Mad Man Pondo, at the time the American booker for the company. Tony trained at local dojos and helped set up chairs at the company, which earned him the respect of the wrestlers. During his first tour, Tony wrestled in mostly singles matches and learned the Japanese style of wrestling. In his third tour, he and Pondo formed the tag team Baka Gaijin, Japanese for Stupid Foreigners. His third tour also included an incident in which local authorities found Tony and Pondo in a city bus, dancing and undulating around a small statue of a frog holding a donut. When questioned, they appeared frightened and attempted to flee. The frog statue is currently in the possession of the Japanese secret service. The team was well received by both the Japanese crowd and the Japanese wrestlers. They continued to wrestle multiple tours together from 2001 to 2006.

== Personal life ==
Borcherding lives in his hometown of Louisville, Kentucky. He has one daughter and one son. The multiple injuries he's suffered in his career include roughly 30 concussions, a split artery in his wrist, a broken leg, both eyebrows being split, and permanent scarring on his forehead. In 2001, Tony and Corporal Robinson signed with Extreme Championship Wrestling, but the company filed bankruptcy that same day. Though they were not in the company long, the duo had become (and still remain) friends with many of the wrestlers.

== Championships and accomplishments ==
- Bad 2 The Bone Wrestling
  - Bad 2 The Bone Wrestling Heavyweight Championship (1 time)
- DDT Pro-Wrestling
  - Ironman Heavymetalweight Championship (1 time)
- IWA Mid-South
  - IWA Mid-South Hardcore Championship (3 times)
  - IWA Mid-South Heavyweight Championship (2 times)
  - IWA Mid-South Double Death Tag Team Tournament (2006) - with Mad Man Pondo
- Insane Wrestling Federation
  - IWF Tag Team Championship (1 times) – with Corporal Robinson
- Juggalo Championship Wrestling
  - JCW Heavyweight Championship (6 times)
  - JCW American Championship (1 time)
  - JCW World Tag Team Championship (1 time) – with Willie Mack as Juggalo World Order
- Midwest Renegade Wrestling
  - MRW Heavyweight Championship (1 time)
- Insane Championship Wrestling (Milwaukee)
  - ICW Heavyweight Championship (1 time)
- Pro Wrestling Illustrated
  - Ranked No. 260 of the top singles wrestlers in the PWI 500 in 2026
- Deathmatch Hall of Fame
  - Class of 2025
