= Thomaselli Brothers =

Professional wrestling stable

Stable
- Members: Pauly Thomaselli; Sal Thomaselli; Vito Thomaselli
- Name(s): The Iron Saints; The Thomaselli Brothers; The Haters
- Billed heights: 5 ft 10 in (1.78 m) - Pauly Thomaselli; 5 ft 9 in (1.75 m) - Sal Thomaselli; 5 ft 10 in (1.78 m) - Vito Thomaselli
- Combined billed weight: 580 lb (260 kg; 41 st)
- Hometown: McHenry, Illinois, U.S.
- Billed from: Chicago, Illinois
- Debut: 2005

The Thomaselli Brothers were a professional wrestling stable that consisted of real life brothers Pauly Thomaselli (Brandon Thomas), Vito Thomaselli (Kent Thomas), and storyline brother Sal Thomaselli (Sal Takavoli). Kent Thomas and Sal Takavoli are now retired. They formerly worked for the American promotion Juggalo Championship Wrestling, as well as occasionally for other various independent promotions.

Before forming the group, all members competed as singles competitors. Sal and Vito first began teaming together in 2005 as The Iron Saints. The duo won the IWA Mid-South Tag Team Championship three times. Brandon permanently joined his brothers in 2007, creating the stable the Thomaselli Brothers. As the Thomaselli Brothers, later renamed the Haters, Pauly and Vito are three time JCW Tag Team Champions.

== Vito Thomaselli (Single career) ==
Vito started his pro wrestling career at the young age of 18.

== Iron Saints are Formed ==
After moving out to California and becoming the head trainer alongside Ric Thompson, Vito's first student was Sal Tavakoli (Thomaselli). Sal and Vito first began teaming together in 2003 as The Iron Saints. The duo won the IWA Mid-South Tag Team Championship three times.

=== IWA Mid-South (2005–2008) ===
Following several years of singles competition, Sal and Vito began teaming together in Independent Wrestling Association Mid-South in 2005 as The Iron Saints. On June 11, the team won the IWA Mid-South Tag Team Championship in a Tag Team Battle Royal Tables Elimination match. One month later, the duo lost the championship to The Bad Breed. On September 10, The Iron Saints won a 4-Team Tournament to regain the championship. The duo defended their championship for six months before losing them to Ian Rotten and Mad Man Pondo on March 18, 2006.

Vito and Sal began teaming with their brother Brandon, bringing him in as an occasional member of The Iron Saints. Brandon, however, focused on a career as a single competitor. On May 26, 2007, The Iron Saints won their third IWA Mid-South Tag Team Championship by winning the 2007 Candido Cup. The duo held the championship for 280 days, becoming the longest reigning tag team champions in IWA Mid-South history.

=== Independent circuit (2007) ===
At Pro Wrestling Unplugged's Pride, Pain, & Punishment event on May 19, 2007, Brandon, Sal, and Vito formed the stable the Thomaselli Brothers. That July, The Iron Saints debuted in Elite Pro Wrestling and won the EPW Tag Team Championship. Vito betrayed and attacked Sal later that September, leading to the two brothers feuding with each other for several weeks. On November 3, The Iron Saints lost the EPW Tag Team Championship to Team W.A.R.

=== Juggalo Championship Wrestling (2007–present) ===
All three Thomaselli brothers debuted in Juggalo Championship Wrestling on December 21, 2007 at that year's Big Ballas' X-Mas Party. In early 2008, Brandon and Vito became involved in a brief feud with the heroic tag team The Ring Rydas. Later that year, Brandon and Vito took part in the "Slam TV Tour 2008." The brothers participated in the "JCW Tag Team Tournament" for the company's vacant JCW Tag Team Championship, but were eliminated in the first round. At Bloodymania II, The Outsiders (Scott Hall and Kevin Nash) defeated the Thomaselli Brothers (Sal and Vito).

That December at Big Ballas X-Mas Party '08, the Thomaselli Brothers (Brandon and Vito) disguised themselves as The Ring Rydas and defeated The Bump-N-Uglies to win the JCW Tag Team Championship. At Bloodymania III, Brandon and Vito lost the championship to The Weedman and Billy Bong. On October 20, 2009, Brandon Thomaselli changed his wrestling name to Pauly Thomaselli. At that year's Hallowicked After-Party, the Thomaselli Brothers (Pauly and Vito) defeated The Weedman and Billy Bong to become two time JCW Tag Team Champions.

Throughout May and June 2010, the Thomaselli Brothers went on tour with JCW on Insane Clown Posse's "Happy Daze Tour." The duo successfully defended their championship on numerous occasion. On June 3, as part of a storyline, the Thomaselli Brothers were renamed The Haters by Juggalo Championship Wrestling owners Insane Clown Posse due to their villainous actions. The Haters were also given masks and costumes that they are forced to wear during all of their matches. At Bloodymania IV, the Haters lost the JCW Tag Team Championship to The Kings of Wrestling in a four way Tag Team match that also featured the Briscoe Brothers and Ring Rydas.

At Flashlight Hysteria, the Haters won their third JCW Tag Team Championship in an 8 tag team battle royal. The team lost the championship to Mad Man Pondo and Necro Butcher in a hardcore Barbed Wire, Thumbtacks, and Ladders match at the following event, Hardcore Hell.

In the spring of 2011 they unsuccessfully pursued JCW Tag Team Championship losing to Mad Man Pondo and Necro Butcher in their rematch at iPPV Hatchet Attacks and later to Ring Rydas (who became champions earlier by defeating Pondo and Necro) at iPPV St. Andrews Brawl.

== Championships and accomplishments ==
- ElitePro Wrestling
  - EPW Tag Team Championship (1 time) – Sal and Vito
- Independent Wrestling Association Deep South
  - IWA Deep South Tag Team Championship (1 time) – Sal and Vito
- Independent Wrestling Association Mid-South
  - IWA Mid-South Tag Team Championship (3 times) – Sal and Vito
- Juggalo Championship Wrestling
  - JCW Tag Team Championship (3 times) – Pauly and Vito
- Pro Wrestling Iron
  - PWI Tag Team Championship (2 times) – Sal and Vito
