= Corporal Robinson =

American professional wrestler

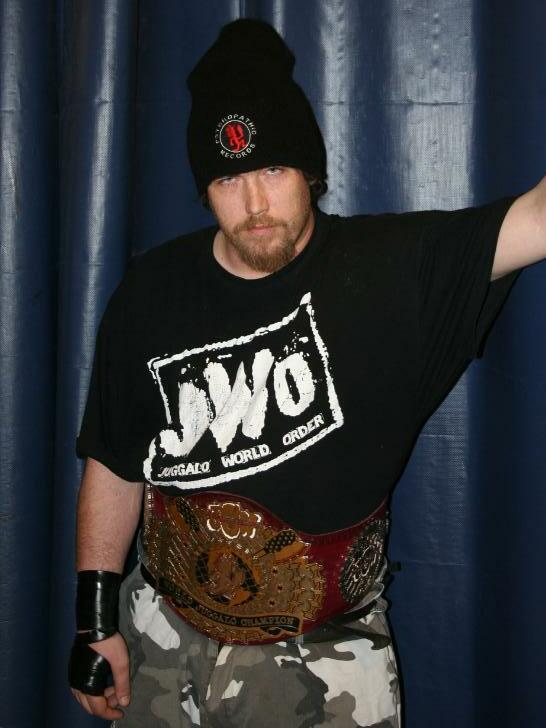
- Robinson in 2008

Personal information
- Born: Stephen Robinson; November 27, 1975 (age 50) Louisville, Kentucky, U.S.

Professional wrestling career
- Ring name: Corporal Robinson
- Billed height: 6 ft 1 in (1.85 m)
- Billed weight: 225 lb (102 kg)
- Billed from: Milwaukee, Wisconsin
- Trained by: Tracy Smothers; Ian Rotten; Jamie Dundee; Kelly Wolfe
- Debut: 1996

Stephen Robinson, known by the ring name Corporal Robinson, (born November 27, 1975), is an American professional wrestler best known for his hardcore wrestling style, Robinson has wrestled for various wrestling promotions, including Juggalo Championship Wrestling, Combat Zone Wrestling, UPW Pro Wrestling, and Independent Wrestling Association Mid-South. He is a former four-time JCW Heavyweight Champion.

In his professional wrestling career, Robinson is an eight time Heavyweight champion having won the CCW Heavyweight Championship once, EPW Heavyweight Championship once, IWA Mid-South Heavyweight Championship once, JCW Heavyweight Championship four times, and MAW Heavyweight Championship once. In addition to these championships, he has won the IWA Mid-South Deathmatch Championship twice, MAW Tag Team Championship once with Hardcore Craig, and PWU Hardcore Championship twice. He held the NWA-CCW tag team title along with his brother, Joey "Kidd" Owens as the team of Pain Inc. Robinson is also the 2004 and 2007 IWA Mid-South King of the Deathmatch Tournament winner.

== Career ==
=== Before wrestling ===
Robinson was attending college on a baseball scholarship, when he was approached by a Marine Corps recruiter and he signed up with an open contract to 2nd Battalion Hotel Company at Parris Island. Robinson was one of 287 recruits to graduate (from an intake of 299) and was designated 0311, serving time in Bosnia.

=== Early career ===
Robinson grew up watching the "pure wrestling" style of the United States Wrestling Association. After leaving the Marine Corps, he began wrestling in the local wrestling scene. At one event, Tracy Smothers was in attendance and saw Robinson wrestle. Following the match, Smothers told him about a wrestling school he, Jamie Dundee, and Kelly Wolfe were a part of and invited Robinson to train there. Under their training, Robinson learned the "pure wrestling" style which he had grown up watching. He soon started his professional career working for Kentuckiana Championship Wrestling. There, Robinson created his gimmick of an ex-Marine, which he legitimately was, and came to the ring waving an American flag and saluting the crowd. During this time, Extreme Championship Wrestling had begun to receive national exposure. After watching an episode of ECW, Robinson fell in love with the Hardcore wrestling style. Ian Rotten soon approached him about joining his promotion IWA Mid-South, which adapted the same hardcore style of wrestling as ECW.

=== IWA Mid-South ===
When Robinson first arrived in IWA-MS, he was still known as a "pure wrestler". However, Robinson experienced his first taste of the hardcore style in February 1998 at "No Blood No Guts No Glory '98". He was originally scheduled to face Shark Boy, while Mad Man Pondo was set to conclude a violent feud with wrestler Trailer Park Trash. The Pondo-Trash match was booked for Pondo to win, however, Trailer Park Trash refused to take part, so Ian Rotten switched the opponents and Robinson took part in his first hardcore match.

Robinson decided to start wrestling deathmatches to show people that wrestling was not fake. He said that "people were saying [that] wrestling's fake, wrestling's fake, this and that. But by the time you got done watching one of my matches, you didn't walk out of that building saying that was fake. [You'd say] those two guys just killed each other." Robinson went on to compete in a wide range of deathmatches in IWA, including 6 King of the Deathmatch tournaments. He also claimed the IWA-MS Heavyweight Championship on 2 occasions, as well as being a 2 time IWA-MS Deathmatch Champion. Robinson is only the second wrestler (behind Ian Rotten) to win the King of the Deathmatch tournament multiple times. Through his work in IWA-MS, Robinson gained national exposure and fully developed his Corporal Robinson character.

=== Insane Wrestling Federation ===
Robinson also wrestled in Insane Wrestling Federation, capturing the IWF Tag Team Title during his stint. The referee for the promotion, A. T. Huck, was also referee and friend of Insane Clown Posse and their promotion Juggalo Championship Wrestling. During Robinson's feud with Sabu, who was also a friend of the duo, Insane Clown Posse attended several shows. The group hung out backstage with their friends, and also began talking to and smoking with Robinson, eventually befriending him.

=== Juggalo Championship Wrestling (1999–2012) ===
In 1997, Robinson wrestled for Insane Clown Posse at the event ICP's Strangle-Mania Live. Two years later, he, 2 Tuff Tony, and Mad Man Pondo wrestled at the Dan Curtis Memorial, an independent wrestling booker who had recently worked for Insane Clown Posse. Several days after the event, Tony, Robinson, and Pondo were booked to wrestle for Insane Clown Posse's first Juggalo Championshit Wrestling show. Video of the event was later released nationally. Robinson continued wrestling for Juggalo Championship Wrestling, including matches at the Gathering of the Juggalos festivals.

On October 31, 2006, Robinson defeated Mad Man Pondo to become the JCW Heavyweight Champion. The following year, Robinson went on tour with JCW to film the internet wrestling show SlamTV!, where he defended his championship against multiple opponents until he began feuding with "Holy" Trent Acid. On March 6, 2007, Corporal Robinson lost the JCW Heavyweight Championship to Trent Acid at West Side Wars. On March 14, at East Side Wars, Robinson defeated Acid in a steel cage match to regain the JCW Heavyweight Championship. At Bloodymania, Robinson successfully defended his championship against WWC Universal Champion Scott Hall, becoming the Lineal World Champion of Professional Wrestling.

On October 6, 2007, Corporal Robinson, Scott Hall, and Violent J formed the Juggalo World Order (JWO) at Evansville Invasion. Shaggy 2 Dope, Nosawa, Kevin Nash, 2 Tuff Tony, and Sid Vicious later joined the group. On November 9, the Juggalo World Order (Scott Hall, Shaggy 2 Dope, Violent J, 2 Tuff Tony, and Corporal Robinson) "invaded" Total Nonstop Action Wrestling's Turning Point PPV by purchasing front row tickets to the event. They proceeded to promote their faction by flashing their JWO jerseys, which each member had on, before being removed from the building.

In 2008, Robinson went on tour with JCW for Season 2 of SlamTV!. In the second episode, he put his JCW Heavyweight Championship on the line against Sexy Slim Goody. When Robinson attempted to hit the Boot Camp, the lights shut off in the arena. When they turned back on, Raven appeared in the ring and hit Robinson with his Evenflow DDT, before stealing the JCW Heavyweight Championship belt. In the third episode, Sexy Slim Goody (kayfabe) knocked Robinson out with a steel chair shot, and Raven began to shave Robinson's afro. Sabu appeared from out of the crowd and scared Raven off, leaving Robinson with a half shaved afro. The tag team of Raven and Sexy Slim Goody had a match against Corporal Robinson and Sabu in the following episode. Raven to fled from the match with the stolen championship belt before Corporal Robinson pinned Sexy Slim Goody. At Bloodymania II, Corporal Robinson defeated Raven in a "Loser leaves JCW" Ladder match to retain his championship.

On May 22, 2010, while touring with JCW on Insane Clown Posse's "Happy Daze Tour," Robinson lost the JCW Heavyweight Championship to Mad Man Pondo. In a Four Corners of Pain rematch nine days later, Robinson defeated Pondo to regain the championship, becoming a record setting three time JCW Heavyweight Champion. At Bloodymania IV, Robinson, with Terry Funk, defeated Mike Knox, with Scott D'Amore, and Raven, with Todd Bridges.

At 2011's Flashlight Hysteria, Robinson was eliminated from an 8 team battle royal when Breyer Wellington interfered in the match. The two were placed in a series of matches for the next several weeks. Per storyline, however, Wellington hired replacements in losing attempts to bring him the JCW Heavyweight Championship. The two finally wrestled each other in a six-man tag team match where Robinson, Tony, and Rhino defeated Wellington and The Haters. A singles match for the championship was made for the next event, but it was changed into a triple threat with Butler Geves at Robinson's request. Kongo Kong interfered in the match and chokeslammed Robinson through a table, allowing Geves to pick up the pinfall and win the championship. On July 28, Robinson defeated Officer Colt Cabana to gain his fourth JCW Heavyweight Championship. On December 31, 2011, Robinson vacated the JCW title and officially retired from professional wrestling due to injuries. Yet, he still remained Lineal World Champion of Professional Wrestling until he would eventually come out of retirement and defend the title.

Corporal Robinson appears as himself with JCW tag partner 2 Tuff Tony in the underground wrestling documentary Wrestling with Disaster, a feature-length film that highlights an indy wrestling show gone horribly awry. The production is currently streaming on YouTube.

Though retired, Robinson made various appearances for numerous independent wrestling promotions performing in exhibitions, tag-team matches, and non-sanctioned death matches on the outlaw circuit.

On August 20, 2021, at JCW BloodyMania at The Gathering of the Juggalos at Legend Valley in Thornville, Ohio, Corporal Robinson appeared as a surprise entrant in the juggalo battle royale.

On October 16, 2021, at a Pro Wrestling King event at the Bourbon Park Pavilion in Bourbon, Indiana, Corporal Robinson officially came out of retirement to give former Insane Clown Posse producer One Man Kru a shot at the Lineal World Championship of Professional Wrestling in a hardcore match. Robinson lost the match and the championship after One Man Kru hit Robinson with his own finishing move, the bootcamp, off the ring apron and through a table to score the pinfall. The match was taped for a documentary style web-series called Wrestle Gaiden.

Corporal Robinson performing the Boot Camp from the second rope on Mad Man Pondo

== Championships and accomplishments ==
- Coliseum Championship Wrestling
  - CCW Heavyweight Championship (1 time)
- Elite Pro Wrestling
  - EPW Heavyweight Championship (1 time, current)
- Independent Wrestling Association Mid-South
  - IWA Mid-South Heavyweight Championship (2 times)
  - IWA Mid-South Deathmatch Championship (2 times)
  - King of the Deathmatch (2004, 2007)
- Insane Championship Wrestling
  - ICW Tag Team Championship (1 time) - with Blazing Benjamin
- Insane Wrestling Federation
  - IWF Tag Team Championship (2 times) - with 2 Tuff Tony & The DBA
- Juggalo Championship Wrestling
  - JCW Heavyweight Championship (4 times)
- Mid-America Wrestling
  - MAW Heavyweight Championship (2 times)
  - MAW Tag Team Championship (1 time) – with Hardcore Craig
  - MAW Hardcore Cup (1999)
- Pro Wrestling Unplugged
  - PWU Hardcore Championship (2 times)
- Underground Empire Wrestling
  - Sovereign Of Slaughter Tournament (2015)

== Personal life ==
Robinson has served as bodyguard and as concert security for Insane Clown Posse and Twiztid. He is good friends with many of the artists and employees on the Psychopathic Records label. Robinson co-hosted two internet radio shows on WFuckOff Radio, Shoot the Shit with DJ Fillin and Eric Davie, and The Main Event with Violent J and 2 Tuff Tony.
