= Mad Man Pondo =

American professional wrestler

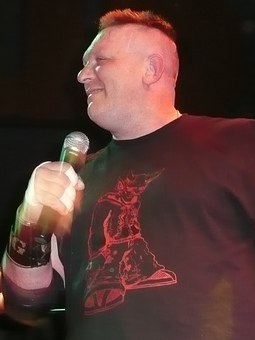
- Mad Man Pondo in October 2008

Personal information
- Born: Kevin Canady; June 24, 1969 (age 57) Flora, Illinois, U.S.

Professional wrestling career
- Ring name(s): Mad Man Pondo; The Original Foolish Foreigner
- Billed height: 5 ft 10 in (1.78 m)
- Billed weight: 220 lb (100 kg)
- Billed from: The Realm of Pain; Flora, Illinois
- Trained by: Bud Chaplin
- Debut: June 24, 1989

Kevin Canady (born June 24, 1969), better known by his ring name Mad Man Pondo, is an American professional wrestler. Best known for his hardcore wrestling style, Canady has wrestled for various wrestling promotions, including Independent Wrestling Association Mid-South, Combat Zone Wrestling, Big Japan Pro Wrestling, and Juggalo Championship Wrestling. He was also the owner of IWA East Coast, and is also employed by Juggalo Championship Wrestling. He was initially released from JCW in August after an incident involving himself and Mickie Knuckles caused significant injury to a fellow opponent by way of negligence, however, he has returned to JCW one month later. Since 2026, Pondo has served as a special guest referee for JCW.

In his professional wrestling career, Canady is a five-time Heavyweight champion having won the IWA Mid-South Heavyweight Championship once, JCW Heavyweight Championship three times, the XCW Pro Wrestling Heavyweight Championship once, and MPW Heavyweight Championship once. In addition to these championships, he has won the CZW Iron Man Championship once, IWA Mid-South Hardcore Championship twice, IWA Mid-South Tag Team Championship once with Ian Rotten, and JCW Tag Team Championship twice with Necro Butcher. Canady is also the 2003 IWA Mid-South King of the Deathmatch Tournament winner and 2006 IWA Mid-South Double Death Tag Team Tournament winner with 2 Tuff Tony.

== Professional wrestling career ==
=== Early career ===
Canady began his professional wrestling career on June 24, 1989 on his 20th birthday. Initially performing as a traditional professional wrestler, Canady realized that he would not become a nationally recognized talent. He noticed that his friends were in awe while watching wrestling tapes of death matches, and soon adopted the same hardcore style himself. He created his ring name Mad Man Pondo as a play on Abdullah the Butcher's nickname the "Mad Man from Sudan" and the character Pondo Sinatra from The Party Animal. He and fellow wrestlers Corporal Robinson and 2 Tuff Tony began traveling throughout the country together early in their careers. Video distribution company Smart Mark Video helped the trio gain national exposure.

=== IWA Mid-South (1997-2008) ===
Canady began working for Independent Wrestling Association Mid-South (IWA-MS) in 1997. In 1999, he volunteered to get into a rivalry with 2 Tuff Tony to help introduce him to the hardcore wrestling style of the company. Pondo acquainted him to the proper techniques of hardcore wrestling, and Tony later recalled that Pondo "took good care of me" in their matches. On April 15, Canady became the first IWA Mid-South Hardcore Champion. He lost the title to Tony two weeks later before winning it back the following month. Canady lost the championship to Tony the next day, but won the IWA Mid-South Heavyweight Championship that September.

In 2003, he participated in the King of the Deathmatch Tournament. Canady defeated Nate Webb, Axl Rotten, then Nick Gage to make it to the finals. In the final match, he defeated J.C. Bailey to be crowned the 2003 King of the Deathmatch. On March 18, 2006, Canady and Ian Rotten defeated Iron Saints to become the IWA Mid-South Tag Team Championship. The duo lost the championship five months later. That November, Canady and 2 Tuff Tony took part in the first Double Death Tag Team Tournament, though they weren't told which team would win the tournament. They defeated Children of Pain then Dysfunction and Corporal Robinson to make it to the finals. In the finals, he and Tony defeated Tough Crazy Bastards to be crowned the first Double Death Tag Team Tournament champions.

He later went on and lost in the second round of the 2008 King of the Deathmatch Tournament.

=== Juggalo Championship Wrestling (1999–present) ===
In 1997, Canady wrestled for Insane Clown Posse at the event ICP's Strangle-Mania Live. Two years later, he, 2 Tuff Tony, and Corporal Robinson wrestled at the Dan Curtis Memorial, an independent wrestling booker who had recently worked for Insane Clown Posse. Several days after the event, Tony, Robinson, and Canady were booked to wrestle for Insane Clown Posse's first Juggalo Championship Wrestling show. Canady teamed with Pete Madden to defeat Ian Rotten and Corporal Robinson in an Exploding Barbwire match.

The following year, Canady participated in the "Strangle-Mania Live Tour". His Hardcore match with Fat Fuck Barrel Boy was put on JCW, Vol. 2. Canady began appearing every year at the annual Gathering of the Juggalos and quickly became a staple in the company. In 2003, he and Necro Butcher fought in a deathmatch which was released on JCW, Vol. 3. Soon after, the two men began teaming together. At the 2005 Gathering of the Juggalos, Canady defeated champion Terry Funk to become JCW Heavyweight Champion. He held the title for over a year before losing it to Corporal Robinson at the Hallowicked After Party 2006.

The following year, Canady went on tour with JCW to film the internet wrestling show SlamTV!. On the first episode, Insane Clown Posse announced that the JCW Tag Team Championship had been vacated, which caused several tag teams to emerge. Canady aligned himself with Necro Butcher, and the team dominated competition for several weeks. However, animosity grew between the two as miscommunication cost both members multiple matches. The following weeks saw the duo break out into fist fights, which led to a series of matches between them. The team reunited at "East Side Wars", though, and eventually established themselves as top contenders for the vacant tag team title. At Bloodymania, the duo won an 8 Team Tag-Team Elimination match to become the new JCW Tag Team Champions. The reign was short lived, however, as Necro Butcher signed a contract with Ring of Honor, forcing Canady to team with several partners. At a live event in Cleveland, Ohio on January 26, 2008, Canady and his partner Breyer Wellington lost the title to 2 Tuff Tony and Violent J.

Canady also wrestled at both Bloodymania II and Bloodymania III in singles matches. At Big Ballas X-Mas Party 2009, Canady and Necro teamed up again to face the Thomaselli Brothers. On May 22, 2010, while touring with JCW on Insane Clown Posse's "Happy Daze Tour," Pondo defeated Corporal Robinson to become a two-time JCW Heavyweight Champion. In a rematch nine days later, Pondo lost the championship to Robinson in a Four Corners of Pain match. At Bloodymania IV, Canady and Necro Butcher lost to the team of Balls Mahoney and Hollywood Chuck Hogan.

On March 9, 2011, at Hardcore Hell, the team of Pondo and Necro Butcher defeated The Haters in a hardcore Barbed Wire, Thumbtacks, and Ladders match for their second JCW Tag Team Championship. The duo lost their championship to Ring Rydas the following month.

On June 19, 2025, Canady would defeat Kerry Morton to win the JCW Heavyweight Championship during a taping of Lunacy at the Epic Events Center in Green Bay, Wisconsin. He would later lose it to Matt Tremont at GCW x JCW Showcase Showdown: The Violence is Right in a death match on July 17, 2025 at the Majestic Theatre in Detroit, Michigan.

=== Combat Zone Wrestling (2000–2008) ===
At Bloodbath 2000, Canady and Ian Rotten wrestled to a draw in his debut match in Combat Zone Wrestling. He continued wrestling for the company, while also participating in their talent exchange with the Japanese company Big Japan Pro Wrestling. Canady won the CZW Iron Man Championship on June 9, but lost it the following September. During his time with the company, Canady was made an honorary member of the stable the H8 Club.

=== Big Japan Pro Wrestling (2000–2008) ===
Canady begin wrestling in Big Japan Pro Wrestling in 2000 as a part of the talent exchange between the company and Combat Zone Wrestling. He wrestled singles matches under the name Original Foolish Foreigner before changing his name back to Mad Man Pondo. The talent exchange between the companies stopped in 2001 when Combat Zone Wrestling demanded more money. Big Japan Pro Wrestling refused, so CZW pulled all of their talent from Japan. Canady, however, refused to leave because the fans and the company treated him well.

He was later named the American booker for Big Japan Pro Wrestling and brought in talent from the states, including 2 Tuff Tony. He and Tony soon formed the tag team Baka Gaijin, Japanese for Stupid Foreigners. The team was well received by both the Japanese crowd and the Japanese wrestlers. They continued to wrestle multiple tours together from 2001 to 2006, while Canady continued singles tours until 2008.

=== Other Promotions ===
==== Horror Slam Wrestling ====
On February 16, 2018 Madman Pondo teamed with Leatherface & Freddie Kreuger to defeat Breyer Wellington, Giuseppe Colonna, & Isiah Broner in his first appearance at Horror Slam Wrestling in Riverview, Michigan.

On October 19, 2018 Adam Rose defeated Madman Pondo.

On December 14, 2018 Madman Pondo & Chuck Stein defeated Jeff King & Peter B. Beautiful in a Deathmatch.

On July 19, 2019 Madman Pondo & Chuck Stein fought to a No Contest in a Deathmatch.

On August 9, 2019 Madman Pondo defeated Chuck Stein to win the Horror Slam Deathmatch Title in Riverview, Michigan.

On September 20, 2019 Chuck Stein defeated Madman Pondo to win back the Horror Slam Deathmatch Title in Lincoln Park, Michigan.

On October 18, 2019 Kongo Kong (with Heidi Katrina) defeated Madman Pondo (with Sabrina Hexx) by DQ.

On November 22, 2019 Madman Pondo defeated Percy Drews.

==== RPW (Ruthless Pro Wrestling) ====
On October 10, 2020 Madman Pondo defeated Poindexter in Erie, Michigan.

On 2 October 2021 at Inked in Blood, Pondo defeated Hoodfoot in a Dog Collar Four Corner Fuckery Match. On 29 January 2022 at Cold Blooded, Rickey Shane Page defeated Pondo in a death match. On 26 February, at Code Orange, Pondo compete in a four way death match which was won by Mickie Knuckles, also involve Neil Diamond Cutter and Otid Cogar.

==== Game Changer Wrestling ====
On January 30, 2021 Madman Pondo defeated Jeff Cannonball at Game Changer Wrestling "UV:60" as part of GCW's Fight Forever 24-hour live stream of wrestling.

==== Total Kaos Wrestling ====
On March 20, 2021, Madman Pondo participated in TKW (Total Kaos Wrestling) "Kaos Kup" Deathmatch Tournament in Taylor, Michigan. Madman Pondo defeated Peter B. Beautiful to win the AIWF World Deathmatch Title in the tournament, but lost the title to Sean Lawhorn in a subsequent match.

== Other media ==
Canady hosted his own Public-access television show in the late nineties. The program, which featured nude women, cursing, and wrestling, attracted the attention of television personality Jerry Springer. First being brought in to portray several different guests on Springer's The Jerry Springer Show, Canaday was later hired to find actors to appear as guests on the show. In 2005, he appeared in director Tim Sullivan's horror movie 2001 Maniacs as the town's blacksmith. As Mad Man Pondo, Canady is a playable character in the video games Backyard Wrestling: Don't Try This at Home, Backyard Wrestling 2: There Goes the Neighborhood, and Fire Pro Wrestling Returns.

In 2018, Mad Man Pondo released his autobiography Memoirs of a Mad Man, published by Eat Sleep Wrestle, LLC.

== Championships and accomplishments ==
- Allied Independent Wrestling Federations
  - AIWF World Deathmatch Championship (1 time)
- Independent Wrestling Association East-Coast
  - IWA East-Coast Tag Team Championship (1 time) – with Necro Butcher
- All Star Wrestling
  - ASW Tag Team Championship (1 time) – with The Juggulator
- Ballistic Championship Wrestling
  - Brink of Death Deathmatch Tournament (2007)
- Atomic Legacy Wrestling
  - ALW Hardcore Championship (1 time)
- Big Japan Pro Wrestling
  - BJW Deathmatch Heavyweight Championship (1 time)
  - BJW Tag Team Championship (2 times) – with Dale Patricks
- Combat Zone Wrestling
  - CZW Iron Man Championship (1 time)
- Destination 1 Wrestling
  - D1W Heavyweight Championship (3 times)
- Dramatic Dream Team
  - Ironman Heavymetalweight Championship (1 time)
- Eastern Wrestling Alliance
  - EWA National Championship (1 time)
- Horror Slam Wrestling
  - Horror Slam Deathmatch Championship (1 time)
- Independent Championship Wrestling
  - ICW Heavyweight Championship (1 time)
- Fighting Ultimate Crazy King
  - Fighting Ultimate Crazy King’s Championship (2 times)
  - Unbelievable Tag Tournament (2005, 2007) – with Necro Butcher (2)
  - Unbelievable Tag Tournament 2 (2006) – with Mr Insanity
  - Unbelievable Tag Tournament IV (2008) – with Takaku Fuke
- Independent Wrestling Association Mid-South
  - IWA Mid-South Hardcore Championship (2 times)
  - IWA Mid-South Heavyweight Championship (1 time)
  - IWA Mid-South Tag Team Championship (1 time) – with Ian Rotten
  - IWA Mid-South King of the Deathmatch Tournament winner (2003)
  - IWA Mid-South Double Death Tag Team Tournament winner (2006) – with 2 Tuff Tony
- Insane Wrestling Federation
  - IWF Cruiserweight Championship (1 time)
- Juggalo Championship Wrestling
  - JCW Heavyweight Championship (3 times)
  - JCW Legends Championship (1 time)
  - JCW Tag Team Championship (3 times) - with Necro Butcher (2) and Crazy Mary Dobson (1)
- Lunatic Wrestling Federation
  - LWF Hardcore Championship (1 time)
- MAD Pro Wrestling
  - MPW Heavyweight Championship (1 time)
- Michigan Championship Wrestling
  - MCW Hardcore Championship (1 time)
- Mid-American Wrestling
  - MAW Hardcore Cup (2000)
- NWA West Virginia/Ohio
  - NWA West Virginia/Ohio Hardcore Championship (1 time)
- Ohio Valley Wrestling
  - OVW Southern Tag Team Championship (1 time) – with Dapper Dan Van Zandt
- Pro Wrestling IRON
  - IRON Television Championship (1 time)
- Real Deal Pro Wrestling
  - RDPW Street Fight Championship (1 time)
- Resistance Pro Wrestling
  - RPW Tag Team Championship (2 times) - with Jay Bradley (1) and Shane Mercer (1)
- Sex and Violence Wrestling
  - Sick F*ck Championship (1 time)
- Stricktly Nsane Pro Wrestling
  - SNPW Heavyweight Championship (1 time)
  - SNPW Tag Team Championship (1 time) - with Cash Borden
- Tri-State Wrestling
  - Tri-State Tag Team Championship (1 time) – with Tommy Lee Sledge
- Westside Xtreme Wrestling
  - wXw Hardcore Championship (1 time)
- World Entertainment Wrestling
  - WEW Six-Man Tag Team Championship (1 time) – with 2 Tuff Tony and Kintaro Kanemura
- Xtreme Championship Wrestling
  - XCW Heavyweight Championship (1 time)
- XCW Wrestling Mid-West
  - XCW Mid-West Heavyweight Championship (1 time, inaugural)
  - XCW Mid-West Heavyweight Championship Tournament (2010)
