= Life's Not Fair =

Life's Not Fair or Life Isn't Fair may refer to:

== Music ==
- "Life Isn't Fair", a song from the 2007 Wisdom in Chains album Class War
- "Life's Not Fair", an instrumental track from the soundtrack to The Lion King (2019)
- "Life's Not Fair", a song on the 2019 deluxe edition of the A-ha album Minor Earth Major Sky
- "Life Isn't Fair", a song from the 2006 Paula Kelley album Some Sucker's Life, Part 1: Demos and Lost Recordings
- "Life's Not Fair It's Fabulous", a musical number from the Burlesque stage production

== Television ==
- "Life Isn't Fair", an episode from season 3 of Any Day Now
- "Life Isn't Fair", an episode from season 22 of Little People, Big World
- "Life's Not Fair, Get Used to It", an episode from season 1 of How to Sell Drugs Online (Fast)

== Other ==
- Life's Not Fair, a 2019 event in the IWA Mid-South Junior Heavyweight Championship
- Life's Not Fair, But God Is Good, a book by Robert Schuller
- Life's Not Fair, So What, a one man show written by John R. Powers

== See also ==
- "Life Ain't Fair and the World Is Mean", a song from the 2013 Sturgill Simpson album High Top Mountain
- "It's Not Fair", 2002 R&B song by Glenn Lewis
- Fairness (disambiguation)
- Meaning of life
- Nihilism
