= IWA Mid-South Junior Heavyweight Championship =

Independent wrestling championship

Details
- Promotion: IWA Mid-South
- Date established: July 1, 2018
- Current champion: Jake Crist
- Date won: October 28, 2021
Statistics
- First champion: Logan James
- Most reigns: Logan James (5 reigns)
- Longest reign: Brayden Lee (217 days)
- Shortest reign: Adam Slade (1 day)
- Oldest champion: Aaron Williams (37 years, 178 days)
- Heaviest champion: Aaron Williams (202 lb)

The IWA Mid-South Junior Heavyweight Championship is a championship created and promoted by the American promotion IWA Mid-South. It can be won and defended only by wrestlers with a maximum weight of 205 lb (93 kg). The title was created in June 2018 with the inaugural champion being Logan James who defeated Jake Lander in a tournament final. There have been a total of 27 reigns and two vacancies shared between 11 different champions. The current champion is Jake Crist who is in his third reign.

== Title history ==
Key
No.	Overall reign number
Reign	Reign number for the specific champion
Days	Number of days held
<1	Reign lasted less than a day
+	Current reign is changing daily

No.	Champion	Championship change			Reign statistics		Notes	Ref.
No.	Champion	Date	Event	Location	Reign	Days	Notes	Ref.
1	Logan James	July 1, 2018	We're Still Breathing	Memphis, Indiana	1	60	Defeated Jake Lander in the tournament final to become the inaugural champion.	
2	Adam Slade	August 30, 2018	Brewing Up Some Violence	Milwaukee, Wisconsin	1	1		
3	Logan James	August 31, 2018	A Labor Of Love	Memphis, Indiana	2	21		
4	Pat Monix	September 21, 2018	Ted Petty Invitational 2018	Indianapolis, Indiana	1	1-34	This was a Ted Petty Invitational Tournament first round match. The exact length of this reign is uncertain. Cagmatch.de shows Monix's only known defence taking place on September 22.	
5	Logan James	September 22 or October 25, 2018 - November 22, 2018	N/A	Indiana	3	34-62	It is currently unknown on what date did James win the title. Cagematch.de shows his first known defence as taking place on October 25.	
6	Aaron Williams	November 22, 2018	Wrestlefeast	Jeffersonville, Indiana	1	126		
7	Sage Phillips	March 28, 2019	Legendary	Jeffersonville, Indiana	1	21		
8	Aaron Williams	April 18, 2019	We Are IWA	Jeffersonville, Indiana	2	21-28	The exact length of this reign is uncertain. Williams last known defence was shown to have taken place on May 9.	
9	Project Monix	May 9 or 16 - May 28, 2019	N/A	Indiana	2	12-19	The exact length of this reign is uncertain. Monix's first known defence was shown to have taken place on May 16. Monix changed his name from Pat to Project.	
10	Aaron Williams	May 16 or 28 - June 20, 2019	N/A	Indiana	3	23-35	The exact length of this reign is uncertain. Williams' first known defence was shown to have taken place on May 28.	
11	Kevin Giza	June 20, 2019	This Is Us	Jeffersonville, Indiana	1	42		
12	Lukas Jacobs	August 1, 2019	Summer Stiff Fest	Jeffersonville, Indiana	1	14		
13	Kevin Giza	August 15, 2019	Life's Not Fair	Jeffersonville, Indiana	2	56	This was a Two out of three falls match in which Giza won score (2-1).	
14	Jake Crist	October 10, 2019	23rd Anniversary Show	Jeffersonville, Indiana	1	49		
15	Kevin Giza	November 28, 2019	Wrestlefeast	Jeffersonville, Indiana	3	30	This was a three-way match also involving Blake Christian where Giza's IWA Mid-South Heavyweight Championship was also on the line.	
—	Vacated	December 28, 2019	—	—	—	—		
16	Project Monix	January 2, 2020	Out With The Old, In With The New 2020	Jeffersonville, Indiana	3	35	This was a intergender six way elimination match also involving Davey Bang, Lola Perez, Lukas Jacobs, Mr. Wrestling #69 and Trent Taylor for the vacant championship.	
17	Brayden Lee	February 6, 2020	Heartbreak	Jeffersonville, Indiana	1	28	This was a four-way gauntlet match also involving Jonathan Wolf and Kevin Giza.	
18	Lukas Jacobs	March 5, 2020	Let The Madness Begin	Jeffersonville, Indiana	2	7		
19	Brayden Lee	March 12, 2020	The Eyes Of March	Jeffersonville, Indiana	2	217		
20	Logan James	October 15, 2020	This Is Our House	Jeffersonville, Indiana	4	28		
21	Jake Crist	November 12, 2020	Fan Appreciation Night	Jeffersonville, Indiana	2	7	This was a 30-minute iron man match in which Crist's IWA Mid-South Heavyweight Championship was also on the line.	
22	Logan James	November 19, 2020	Just Another Manic Thursday	Jeffersonville, Indiana	5	44		
—	Vacated	January 2, 2021	—	—	—	—		
23	Blake 182	January 2, 2021	Out With The Old, In With The New	Jeffersonville, Indiana	1	61	Defeated Anakin Murphy, Joe Demaro, Kevin Giza, NERD #5, Nick King and Sage Philips in a seven-way match to win the vacant title.	
24	Kevin Giza	March 4, 2021	School's In	Jeffersonville, Indiana	4	2		
25	Aaron Williams	March 6, 2021	The 1000th Show	Jeffersonville, Indiana	4	67		
—	Vacated	May 12, 2021	—	—	—	—	Vacated under unknown circumstances. A tournament to crown a new champion was announced by IWA.	
26	Matt Diesel	September 16, 2021	Junior Heavyweight Title Tournament	Jeffersonville, Indiana	1	42	Defeated Corey Storm in a tournament final to win the vacant title.	
27	Jake Crist	October 28, 2021	Our Last Spooktacular	Jeffersonville, Indiana	3	1,599+	This was a Winner takes all match where Crist's IWA Mid-South Heavyweight Championship was also on the line.	
—	Deactivated	June 14, 2022	—	—	—	—	Crist vacated the title after he failed to receive payment. The promotion ceased operations as a result.	

== Combined reigns ==
As of March 15, 2026.

†	Indicates the current champion
¤	The exact length of at least one title reign is uncertain, so the shortest length is considered.

Rank	Wrestler	No. of reigns	Combined days
1	Brayden Lee	2	245
2	Aaron Williams	4	¤237-256
3	Jake Crist †	3	1,655+
4	Logan James	5	¤187-215
5	Kevin Giza	4	130
6	Blake 182	1	61
7	Pat/Project Monix	3	¤48-88
8	Matt Diesel	1	42
9	Lukas Jacobs	2	21
9	Sage Phillips	1	21
11	Adam Slade	1	1

== See also ==
- Independent Wrestling Association Mid-South
- History of professional wrestling in the United States
