= Ted Petty Invitational =

Annual independent wrestling tournament by IWA Mid-South

- Promotions: Independent Wrestling Association Mid-South
- First event: Sweet Science Sixteen: 2000; Ted Petty Invitational: 2002
- Event gimmick: Annual single elimination tournament

The Ted Petty Invitational tournament (the TPI) is an independent wrestling tournament in North America, run and promoted by Independent Wrestling Association Mid-South. Created as the Sweet Science Sixteen in 2000 by Ian Rotten, the tournament was originally supposed to showcase the top technical independent wrestlers. After the death of Ted Petty in September 2002, Rotten changed the name to honor his friend. The tournament was expanded to 24 participants, with a three-way final, in 2003. Over the years, the tournament has attracted numerous famous independent wrestlers from Ken Anderson to A.J. Styles to James Gibson.

== The Tournament Setup ==
In the first three years of the Sweet Science Sixteen/TPI, there were only sixteen participants. With eight opening round matches, four quarterfinal matches, two semifinal matches, and a final, the tournament shows were reasonable in length. The expansion to twenty-four in 2003 caused the addition of another eight person bracket. It also created three semifinals matches and a three way final. The final is now an elimination match.

== Tournament winners ==
- 2000: Chris Hero
- 2001: Ace Steel
- 2002: B. J. Whitmer
- 2003: Danny Daniels
- 2004: A.J. Styles
- 2005: Matt Sydal
- 2006: Low Ki
- 2007: Mike Quackenbush
- 2008: Drake Younger
- 2015: Kongo Kong
- 2016: Chris Hero
- 2017: Aaron Williams
- 2018: Aaron Williams
- 2019: Larry D
- 2020: Tyler Matrix
- 2021: Jake Crist

== Results ==
=== 2000 Sweet Science Sixteen ===
The first annual Sweet Science Sixteen was held on September 8 and 9, 2000 outside the House of Hardcore in Charlestown, Indiana.

First round
American Kickboxer
Breyer Wellington
Chris Hero
Colt Cabana
Orion
Hy-Zaya
Shark Boy
Ace Steel
B. J. Whitmer
Chip Fairway
Gavin Starr
Harry Palmer
CM Punk
Chuck E. Smooth
Suicide Kid
Super Hentai

Quarter-finals
American Kickboxer
Chris Hero
Hy-Zaya
Ace Steel
Chip Fairway
Harry Palmer
CM Punk
Suicide Kid

Semi-finals
Chris Hero
Ace Steel
Harry Palmer
Suicide Kid

Final
Chris Hero
Harry Palmer

=== 2001 Sweet Science Sixteen ===
The second annual Sweet Science Sixteen was held on September 7 and 8, 2001 at the House of Hardcore in Charlestown, Indiana.

First round
Trent Baker
Nova
Dino Bambino
CM Punk
Tarek the Great
Colt Cabana
Mitch Ryder
Mark Wolf
Adam Pearce
Chris Hero
Mike Quackenbush
B. J. Whitmer
Danny Dominion
American Kickboxer
Ace Steel
Suicide Kid

Quarter-finals
Nova
Dino Bambino
Tarek The Great
Mark Wolf
Adam Pearce
B. J. Whitmer
Danny Dominion
Ace Steel

Semi-finals
Nova
Tarek The Great
Adam Pearce
Ace Steel

Final
Nova
Ace Steel

=== 2002 Ted Petty Invitational ===
The first-annual Ted Petty Invitational took place on November 1 and 2, 2002 at the IWA Arena in Clarksville, Indiana.

First round
Matt Murphy
B. J. Whitmer
Ace Steel
Super Dragon
Nick Mondo
Nate Webb
Ken Anderson
Colt Cabana
Chris Hero
Matt Stryker
Jimmy Rave
Tarek the Great
Christopher Daniels
A.J. Styles
MDogg20
CM Punk

Quarter-finals
B. J. Whitmer
Ace Steel
Nick Mondo
Colt Cabana
Chris Hero
Jimmy Rave
Christopher Daniels
CM Punk

Semi-finals
B. J. Whitmer
Colt Cabana
Chris Hero
CM Punk

Final
B. J. Whitmer
CM Punk

* Whitmer won the IWA Mid-South Heavyweight Championship by defeating Punk in the finals.

- Non-tournament matches:

- Night One

- Necro Butcher defeated Corporal Robinson in a Fans Bring the Weapons Drunken Deathmatch

- Night Two

- A.J. Styles defeated MDogg20, Matt Stryker and Super Dragon in a Four Corners match
- Hailey Hatred defeated Lacey and Rain in a three-way match
- Ian Rotten defeated Josh Prohibition
- Bull Pain defeated Necro Butcher, Corporal Robinson, Rollin' Hard, 2 Tuff Tony and Nate Webb in a Gauntlet match

=== 2003 Ted Petty Invitational ===
The 2003 tournament was the first to expand to twenty-four participants. Since it was no longer known as the Sweet Science Sixteen, Rotten didn't limit the number to just sixteen wrestlers. The weekend is still regarded as the hook for drawing in new fans for IWA-MS.

The 2003 Ted Petty Invitational tournament was held on November 7–8, 2003 from the Salem High School in Salem, Indiana. Among the participants were Styles, former ECW World Champion Jerry Lynn, Michael Shane, the cousin of Shawn Michaels, and future WWE Smackdown star Ken Anderson. Among the highlights are: Ian Rotten's Cinderella run to the semifinals; Alex Shelley's breakthrough in IWA-MS; and Danny Daniels trying to save his IWA-MS World title throughout the entire tournament.

1st Round; TPI
A.J. Styles
Todd Sexton
Jerry Lynn
Michael Shane
Colt Cabana
Jimmy Rave
Danny Daniels
Ken Anderson

Quarterfinals; TPI
A.J. Styles
Jerry Lynn
Jimmy Rave
Danny Daniels

Semifinals; TPI
AJ Styles
Danny Daniels
Finals; TPI

1st Round; TPI
Ian Rotten
Mickie Knuckles
Jimmy Jacobs
Sal Rinauro
Jonny Storm
M-Dogg 20
Alex Shelley
Chris Sabin

Quarterfinals; TPI
Ian Rotten
Jimmy Jacobs
Jonny Storm
Alex Shelley

Semifinals; TPI
Ian Rotten
Alex Shelley
Finals; TPI

1st Round; TPI
Chris Hero
Arik Cannon
Nate Webb
Sonjay Dutt
Brad Bradley
Nigel McGuinness
B-Boy
J.C. Bailey

Quarterfinals; TPI
Chris Hero
Sonjay Dutt
B-Boy
Nigel McGuinness

Semifinals; TPI
Chris Hero
B-Boy
Finals; TPI

Finals: Danny Daniels defeated Chris Hero and Alex Shelley to retain the IWA-MS World title and win the 2003 TPI.

- Non Tournament Matches:
- Night Two:
- Mickie Knuckles defeated Rain
- Brad Bradley & Ryan Boz defeated J.C. Bailey & Nate Webb
- Colt Cabana defeated Arik Cannon, Ken Anderson, M-Dogg 20, Chris Sabin and Michael Shane in an elimination match

=== 2004 Ted Petty Invitational ===
The 2004 Ted Petty Invitational tournament was held on September 17–18, 2004 from the Lincoln Center in Highland, Indiana. Among the participants were Styles, Bryan Danielson, Samoa Joe, Chris Hero, Mike Quackenbush, CM Punk, Claudio Castagnoli, A J Styles, Nigel McGuiness and Matt Sydal. On Night One, Danielson beat Alex Shelley in a technical classic; Joe survived a stiff match with Roderick Strong. Hero's losing streak in Highland continued with a loss to Quackenbush. Sydal managed to beat Sal Rinauro. In a tournament match that was also for the company's heavyweight championship, Petey Williams beat 2002 T.P.I. winner B. J. Whitmer to retain the belt.

1st Round; TPI
Samoa Joe	14:17
Roderick Strong
Nigel McGuinness	13:28
Claudio Castagnoli
Chris Sabin
Rainman	10:16
Danny Daniels	10:55
Todd Sexton

Quarterfinals; TPI
Samoa Joe	13:27
Nigel McGuinness
Rainman	9:58
Danny Daniels

Semifinals; TPI
Samoa Joe	:55
Rainman
Finals; TPI

1st Round; TPI
A.J. Styles	12:41
Jimmy Rave
Matt Sydal	9:36
Sal Rinauro
Super Dragon
Arik Cannon	13:44
Petey Williams	13:00
B. J. Whitmer

Quarterfinals; TPI
A.J. Styles	12:36
Matt Sydal
Arik Cannon	12:19
Petey Williams

Semifinals; TPI
A.J. Styles	6:02
Arik Cannon
Finals; TPI

1st Round; TPI
Chris Hero
Mike Quackenbush	16:34
Nate Webb	8:43
Hallowicked
CM Punk	16:45
Austin Aries
Bryan Danielson	14:41
Alex Shelley

Quarterfinals; TPI
Nate Webb
Mike Quackenbush	7:26
Bryan Danielson	16:03
CM Punk

Semifinals; TPI
Mike Quackenbush	11:28
Bryan Danielson
Finals; TPI

Finals: A.J. Styles d. Samoa Joe and Bryan Danielson to win the 2004 TPI

- Non Tournament Matches:
- Night One:

- Mercedes Martinez defeated Lacey to win the IWA-MS/NWA Midwest Women's title
- Jimmy Jacobs defeated Delirious in a Ladder Match to win the IWA Mid-South Light Heavyweight title

- Night Two

- C. J. McManus defeated Billy McNeil and Thunderbolt
- Jimmy Jacobs defeated Sal Rinauro to retain the IWA Mid-South Light Heavyweight Title
- Ian Rotten and Steve Stone wrestled to a no contest
- Larry Sweeney, Hallowicked & Jigsaw defeated Gran Akuma, Icarus & Trik Davis
- MsChif defeated Rain, Mickie Knuckles, Daizee Haze, Lacey and Mercedes Martinez in a Non-Title 6-Woman Elimination Match
- The Wild Cards (Eddie Kingston & Blackjack Marciano) defeated Iceberg & Tank and Brad Bradley & Ryan Boz to win the IWA-MS Tag Team titles
- B. J. Whitmer defeated Chris Sabin, Jimmy Rave, Austin Aries, Alex Shelley, Todd Sexton and Claudio Castagnoli in an elimination match

=== 2005 Ted Petty Invitational ===
The 2005 Ted Petty Invitational took place on September 23–24, 2005 at the National Guard Armory in Hammond, Indiana. Although the tournament suffered through numerous drop outs and injuries, it is still highly regarded by independent wrestling fans. Among the drop outs included: defending champion Styles (due to strep throat) and Homicide (alleged legal issues).

A year after losing in the quarterfinals, Sydal came through with the biggest break of his career. He beat El Generico in the first round in a crowd-pleasing match. He also eliminated Tyler Black (quarterfinals), Chris Sabin (semifinals), before overcoming the odds and beating Kevin Steen and Cannon to win the tournament.

Other great matches from that weekend include a title match between Jacobs and Knuckles that saw everyone from Ian Rotten to The Iron Saints get involved. Shelley and Quackenbush put on a technical classic. Chris Hero and Arik Cannon had a violent encounter with audibly loud headbutts that culminated in Hero turning heel and injuring Cannon's arm. American Dragon's match with Claudio Castagnoli headlined the first night.

1st Round; TPI
Kevin Steen	6:45
Nate Webb
Brad Bradley	5:05
Tank
Mike Quackenbush	17:32
Alex Shelley
Skayde	10:17
Puma

Quarterfinals; TPI
Kevin Steen	7:27
Brad Bradley
Mike Quackenbush	12:24
Skayde

Semifinals; TPI
Kevin Steen	10:05
Mike Quackenbush
Finals; TPI

1st Round; TPI
Arik Cannon	12:17
Joey Ryan
Brandon Thomaselli
Delirious	15:03
Chris Hero	14:50
Rainman
Claudio Castagnoli
Bryan Danielson	21:56

Quarterfinals; TPI
Arik Cannon	22:45
Delirious
Chris Hero	21:47
Bryan Danielson

Semifinals; TPI
Arik Cannon	21:10
Chris Hero
Finals; TPI

1st Round; TPI
James Gibson
Josh Abercrombie	15:48
Chris Sabin	10:20
Marek Brave
El Generico
Matt Sydal	14:45
Tyler Black	10:17
Sal Thomaselli

Quarterfinals; TPI
Josh Abercrombie
Chris Sabin	12:29
Matt Sydal	12:56
Tyler Black

Semifinals; TPI
Chris Sabin
Matt Sydal	13:30
Finals; TPI

Finals: Matt Sydal defeated Arik Cannon and Kevin Steen to win the 2005 TPI

Non Tournament Matches:

- Night One

- Jimmy Jacobs defeated Colt Cabana to retain the IWA-MS World title

- Night Two

- Marek Brave defeated Trik Davis
- Jimmy Jacobs defeated Mickie Knuckles to retain the IWA-MS World title
- The Iron Saints (Sal & Vito Thomaselli) defeated Rainman & Tank to retain the IWA-MS Tag Team titles
- Super Dragon, Alex Shelley, Joey Ryan & Claudio Castagnoli defeated El Generico, Puma, Brandon Thomaselli & Nate Webb in an elimination match

=== 2006 Ted Petty Invitational ===
The 2006 TPI was held on September 29 & 30, 2006 in Midlothian, IL. It was another loved tournament featuring matches and performances from the likes of Low Ki, Strong, Quackenbush, and many more. In addition, it saw the returns of Jimmy Jacobs and Necro Butcher to IWA-MS after a leave of absence as well as Chuck Taylor winning the IWA-MS World title from Toby Klein.

The 2006 TPI saw the return of M-Dogg 20, a former IWA-MS World Champion, to the company and he managed to get to round 2. Pro Wrestling Guerrilla was represented by six regulars (Chris Bosh, Scott Lost, Scorpio Sky, Kevin Steen, El Generico and Davey Richards) but finished the tournament with a combined 3–6 record.

1st Round; TPI
Low Ki	17:37
Gran Akuma
Davey Richards	12:08
Jigsaw
M-Dogg 20	9:55
Ricochet
El Generico	15:03
Chris Bosh

Quarterfinals; TPI
Low Ki	16:41
Davey Richards
M-Dogg 20
El Generico	13:27

Semifinals; TPI
Low-Ki	8:02
El Generico
Finals; TPI

1st Round; TPI
Arik Cannon	13:07
B-Boy
Scorpio Sky
Hallowicked	9:33
Mike Quackenbush	13:36
Colt Cabana
Claudio Castagnoli	8:56
Kevin Steen

Quarterfinals; TPI
Arik Cannon	11:18
Hallowicked
Mike Quackenbush
Claudio Castagnoli	9:42

Semifinals; TPI
Arik Cannon	14:39
Claudio Castagnoli
Finals; TPI

1st Round; TPI
Roderick Strong	8:03
Brandon Thomaselli
Delirious	10:41
Scott Lost
Trik Davis	9:20
Erick Stevens
Chris Hero	12:30
Ricky Reyes

Quarterfinals; TPI
Roderick Strong	14:46
Delirious
Trik Davis
Chris Hero	16:30

Semifinals; TPI
Roderick Strong	10:39
Chris Hero
Finals; TPI

Finals: Low-Ki defeated Arik Cannon and Roderick Strong to win the 2006 TPI

Non Tournament Matches:

- Night Two

- The Iron Saints (Sal & Vito Thomaselli) and American Kickboxer & Tarek the Great wrestled to a no contest
- BLK OUT (Eddie Kingston & Joker) & Ricochet defeated The Iron Saints (Sal, Vito & Brandon Thomaselli)
- The North Star Express (Darin Corbin & Ryan Cruz) won a 6 team Battle Royal, last eliminating B-Boy & Ricky Reyes
- Josh Abercrombie defeated Tyler Black in a Loser Leaves Town Match to retain the IWA-MS Light-Heavyweight title
- Chuck Taylor defeated Toby Klein to win the IWA-MS World title

=== 2007 Ted Petty Invitational ===
The 2007 TPI took place on September 28 and 29 in Midlothian. Samoa Joe, Alex Shelley, Low-Ki, Matt Sydal, El Generico, B-Boy, and Tony Kozina were previously scheduled but were later removed from the tournament. Matt Sydal reported to OVW and was not be able to participate, El Generico was out due to hamstring injury, B-Boy was planning on retiring and wanted to heal up before his retirement tour, Jimmy Rave signed with TNA and Tony Kozina removed himself.

1st Round; TPI
Chris Hero
2 Cold Scorpio
Chuck Taylor
Jimmy Jacobs
Eddie Kingston
Human Tornado
Drake Younger
Nate Webb

Quarterfinals; TPI
2 Cold Scorpio
Chuck Taylor
Human Tornado
Nate Webb

Semifinals; TPI
Chuck Taylor
Human Tornado
Finals; TPI

1st Round; TPI
Claudio Castagnoli
Nigel McGuiness
Davey Richards
B. J. Whitmer
Brent Albright
Tank
C. J. Otis
Joker

Quarterfinals; TPI
Claudio Castagnoli
Davey Richards
Brent Albright
Joker

Semifinals; TPI
Claudio Castagnoli
Brent Albright
Finals; TPI

1st Round; TPI
Mike Quackenbush
Billy Roc
Brandon Thomaselli
Joey Ryan
Josh Abercrombie
Ricochet
Devon Moore
Dysfunction

Quarterfinals; TPI
Mike Quackenbush
Joey Ryan
Josh Abercrombie
Devon Moore

Semifinals; TPI
Mike Quackenbush
Josh Abercrombie
Finals; TPI

Finals: Mike Quackenbush defeated Claudio Castagnoli and Chuck Taylor to win the 2007 TPI, retain the IWA Mid-South Light Heavyweight Championship and win the IWA Mid-South Heavyweight Championship.

Non Tournament Matches:

- Night Two -

- Eddie Kingston defeated Chris Hero in a Last Man Standing match
- The Irons Saints defeated Nigel McGuinness and B. J. Whitmer via DQ to retain the IWA-MS Tag Team Titles

=== 2008 Ted Petty Invitational ===
The 2008 TPI took place on September 26 and 27 at the Hartman Recreation Center in Joliet, Illinois. Non-tournament matches included a Steel Cage I Quit Match for the Light Heavyweight Championship between Jayson Quick and Jason Hades, a Falls Count Anywhere match between Chris Hero and Trik Davis, and a Loser Leaves IWA Mid-South for a Year Match between Dingo def. Jayson Strife.

The 2008 poster was designed by Mark Young of Wardust Design.

Roster changes

- On July 15, 2008, IWA Mid South announced that previously announced entrant Delirious had been taken out of the tournament to work in England along with Roderick Strong. Later, El Generico was also announced to be working the show in England.
- On August 8, Arik Cannon was announced as being unavailable to compete in both nights, and was therefore replaced by AAA wrestler Cassandro.
- On August 12, it was announced that B. J. Whitmer was undergoing surgery on his hand, and would be replaced by Ares.
- At the We Are Family 2 show on August 17, it was announced that Jayson Quick and Jason Hades were both pulled from the TPI and will instead meet in a Steel Cage I Quit Match for the IWA Mid-South Light Heavyweight Championship, with the added stipulation that the loser must drop Ja(y)son from their name.
- Before Night One started, it was announced that defending champion Mike Quackenbush would not be taking part in the tournament due to a family emergency.
- During the introductions on Night One, Dingo was attacked by Jayson Strife, later demanding he was removed from the tournament. As such, a Match was booked between Dingo and Strife for the IWA-MS Heavyweight Championship later that night, with the added stipulation that the loser must leave IWA Mid-South for a year
- Quackenbush and Dingo were replaced by Necro Butcher and Eddie Kingston

1st Round; TPI
Claudio Castagnoli
Jimmy Jacobs
Dave Taylor
Tracy Smothers
Sara Del Rey
Trik Davis
Cassandro
Chuck Taylor

Quarterfinals; TPI
Claudio Castagnoli
Dave Taylor
Sara Del Rey
Cassandro

Semifinals; TPI
Claudio Castagnoli
Sara Del Rey
Finals; TPI

1st Round; TPI
Sami Callihan
Chris Hero
Eddie Kingston
Necro Butcher
Ace Steel
Ares
2 Cold Scorpio
Bobby Fish

Quarterfinals; TPI
Sami Callihan
Eddie Kingston
Ace Steel
2 Cold Scorpio

Semifinals; TPI
Sami Callihan
2 Cold Scorpio
Finals; TPI

1st Round; TPI
Egotistico Fantastico
Prince Mustafa Ali
Josh Raymond
Tyler Black
Michael Elgin
Ricochet
Drake Younger
2 Tuff Tony

Quarterfinals; TPI
Egotistico Fantastico
Josh Raymond
Michael Elgin
Drake Younger

Semifinals; TPI
Egotistico Fantastico
Drake Younger
Finals; TPI

Finals: Drake Younger defeated Claudio Castagnoli and Sami Callihan to win the 2008 TPI.

Non Tournament Matches:

Night 1 - Loser Leaves IWA Mid-South for a Year Match: IWA-MS Heavyweight Championship: Dingo defeated Jayson Strife

- Night 2

- Tag Team Challenge Match: The Age of the Fall (Jimmy Jacobs and Tyler Black) defeated Da Soul Touchaz (Acid Jazz and Marshe Rockett)
- "I Quit" Steel Cage Match for the IWA-MS Light Heavyweight Championship AND rights to the name Ja(y)son: Jason Hades defeated Jayson Quick
- Six Man Tag Match: Dingo, Ricochet, and Bobby Fish defeated Prince Mustafa Ali, 2 Tuff Tony, and Ares
- Falls Count Anywhere Match: Trik Davis defeated Chris Hero

=== 2015 Ted Petty Invitational ===
After shows were announced and cancelled in 2009, 2010, 2013 and 2014, the Ted Petty Invitational returned on December 11, 2015, at the Colgate Gymnasium in Clarksville, Indiana. The tournament was won by Kongo Kong, who also won the IWA Mid-South Heavyweight Championship in his semifinal match against former champion Reed Bentley, who had earlier defended his title against Russ Jones.

Quarterfinals
Matt Cage
Jordynne Grace, Slade Sludge
Shane Mercer
Sugar Dunkerton

Semifinals
Shane Mercer
Matt Cage

Quarterfinals
Hy-Zaya
Jonathan Gresham
Chris Hero
Timothy Thatcher

Semifinals
Hy-Zaya
Chris Hero

Quarterfinals
Reed Bentley (C)
Russ Jones
Kongo Kong
Masada

Semifinals
Kongo Kong
Reed Bentley (C)

Non-tournament match: Joseph Schwartz & The Zodiak defeated The Hooligans (Devin Cutter & Mason Cutter) in a Falls Count Anywhere Tag Match.

Finals: Kongo Kong defeated Shane Mercer and Chris Hero to win the 2015 Ted Petty Invitational and retain the IWA Mid-South Heavyweight Championship.

=== 2016 Ted Petty Invitational ===
The 2016 Ted Petty Invitational was held on November 5 at The Arena in Jeffersonville, Indiana. It featured 16 wrestlers, with eight one on one matches in the first round, two four-way elimination matches in the second round and a one on one final.

First round
Zodiak
John Wayne Murdoch
Cole Radrick
Sami Callihan
Rickey Shane Page
Reed Bentley
Jake Parnell
Johnathan Wolf
Tripp Cassidy
Shane Mercer
Joey Janela
Jake Crist
Trik Davis
Ace Perry
Corey Storm
Chris Hero

Quarter-finals
John Wayne Murdoch
Cole Radrick; Jake Christ; Shane Mercer
Trik Davis; Rickey Shane Page; Corey Storm
Chris Hero

Semi-finals

Final
John Wayne Murdoch
Chris Hero

== 2017 Ted Petty Invitational ==
The 2017 Ted Petty Invitation was held on September 14-15 2017 at the IWA Arena in Memphis, Indiana.

ROUND 1
Zodiak defeated Calvin Tankman
Su Yung defeated Ludark Shaitan
Shane Strickland defeated Ace Perry
Mance Warner defeated Space Monkey
Larry D defeated Kongo Kong
Jonathan Gresham defeated Anthony Henry
Jake Crist defeated Dave Crist
Homicide defeated Gary Jay
Eddie Kingston defeated Nate Webb
Devon Moore defeated Johnathan Wolf
David Starr defeated Shane Mercer
Aaron Williams defeated Arik Cannon(IWA Mid-South Heavyweight Title Match)

QUARTER-FINAL
Su Yung defeated Homicide
Larry D defeated Mance Warner
Jonathan Gresham defeated Devon Moore
Jake Crist defeated Shane Strickland
Eddie Kingston defeated Zodiak
Aaron Williams defeated David Starr (IWA Mid-South Heavyweight Title Match)

SEMI-FINAL
Jonathan Gresham defeated Larry D
Jake Crist defeated Su Yung
Aaron Williams defeated Eddie Kingston (IWA Mid-South Heavyweight Title Match)

Non Tournament Matches: Night 2: Nate Webb defeated Space Monkey; Gary Jay & Ludark Shaitan defeated Anthony Henry & Shane Sabre; Eight Man Tag Team Match: Ace Perry, Cole Radrick, Dave Crist & Kongo Kong defeated Arik Cannon, Calvin Tankman, Johnathan Wolf & Shane Mercer (w/Jason Saint); IWA Mid-South Heavyweight Title Match: Aaron Williams (c) defeated Devon Moore (after the Final)

FINALS
Aaron Williams defeated Jonathan Gresham and Jake Crist (IWA Mid-South Heavyweight Title Match)

2017 Ted Petty Invitational Winner "The Baddest Man Alive" Aaron Williams

== 2018 Ted Petty Invitational ==
The 2018 Ted Petty Invitation was held on September 21-22 2018 at the German Park Turner Building in Indianapolis, Indiana. ROUND 1
Tyler Bateman defeated Tripp Cassidy
Kongo Kong defeated Calvin Tankman
Eddie Kingston defeated Anthony Henry
IWA Mid-South Jr. Heavyweight Title: Pat Monix defeated Logan James(c)
Aaron Williams defeated Jake Crist
Larry D defeated Jake Lander
Devon Moore defeated Myron Reed
Jonathan Wolf defeated Joe Alonzo
Mance Warner defeated Gary Jay
Shane Strickland defeated Jimmy Jacobs
Chase Owens defeated Jake Omen
IWA Mid-South Heavyweight Title: Michael Elgin(c) defeated Shane Mercer

QUARTER-FINAL
IWA Mid-South Jr. Heavyweight Title: Pat Monix(c) defeated Devon Moore
Larry D defeated Kongo Kong
Aaron Williams defeated Tyler Bateman
Mance Warner defeated Jonathan Wolf
Shane Strickland defeated Eddie Kingston
IWA Mid-South Heavyweight Title: Michael Elgin(c) defeated Chase Owens

SEMI-FINAL
Larry D defeated Pat Monix
Aaron Williams defeated Mance Warner
IWA Mid-South Heavyweight Title: Michael Elgin(c) defeated Shane Strickland

Non Tournament Matches; Night 2:IWA Mid-South Tag Team Title Four Way Match: The Top Guys (Adam Slade & Kevin Giza) (w/Billy The P & Lukas Jacobs) defeated The Gym Nasty Boyz (Timmy Lou Retton & White Mike) (c) and Jimmy Jacobs & Joe Alonzo and Logan James & Myron Reed; Eight Man Tag Team Match: Calvin Tankman, Jake Lander, Jake Omen & Matt Kenway defeated Gary Jay, Joey Owens, Shane Mercer & Tripp Cassidy

FINALS
Aaron Williams defeated Michael Elgin & Larry D(IWA Mid-South Heavyweight Title Match)

2018 Ted Petty Invitational Winner "The Baddest Man Alive" Aaron Williams

== 2019 Ted Petty Invitational ==
The 2019 Ted Petty Invitation was held on September 12-13 2019 at the Arena in Jeffersonville, Indiana.

Night 1 (September 12)
No.	Results	Stipulations
1	Blake Christian defeated Brayden Lee	Ted Petty Invitational Tournament First-round match
2	Matthew Justice defeated Corey Roberts	Ted Petty Invitational Tournament First-round match
3	Jason Kincaid defeated Sage Philips	Ted Petty Invitational Tournament First-round match
4	Adam Slade defeated H. C. Loc	Ted Petty Invitational Tournament First-round match
5	Joe Travis defeated Tyler Matrix	Ted Petty Invitational Tournament First-round match
6	Fred Yehi defeated Shane Mercer	Ted Petty Invitational Tournament First-round match
7	Larry D defeated Monsta Mack	Ted Petty Invitational Tournament First-round match
8	Aaron Williams defeated Alice Crowley	Ted Petty Invitational Tournament First-round match
9	Anthony Henry defeated Calvin Tankman	Ted Petty Invitational Tournament First-round match
10	Joey Ryan defeated Project Monix	Ted Petty Invitational Tournament First-round match
11	Kongo Kong (c) defeated Matt Gilbert	Ted Petty Invitational Tournament First-round match for the IWA Mid-South Heavyweight Championship
12	Logan James defeated Kevin Giza	Ted Petty Invitational Tournament First-round match
(c) / – the champion(s) heading into the match

Night 1 (September 12)
No.	Results	Stipulations
1	Blake Christian defeated Joe Travis and Logan James	Three-way quarter-final match
2	Larry D defeated Adam Slade and Joey Ryan	Three-way quarter-final match
3	Jason Kincaid defeated Anthony Henry and Fred Yehi	Three-way quarter-final match
4	Aaron Williams defeated Kongo Kong (c) and Matthew Justice (w/Bobby Beverly)	Three-way quarter-final match for the IWA Mid-South Heavyweight Championship
5	Larry D defeated Blake Christian	Semi-final match
6	Aaron Williams (c) defeated Jason Kincaid	Semi-final match for the IWA Mid-South Heavyweight Championship
7	Larry D defeated Aaron Williams (c)	Final match for the IWA Mid-South Heavyweight Championship
(c) / – the champion(s) heading into the match

== 2020 Ted Petty Invitational ==
The 2020 Ted Petty Invitation was rescheduled from last year (Note: The tournament was postponed for 2021 due to the ongoing COVID-19 pandemic at the time.) at The ArenA in Jeffersonville, Indiana and took place between April 23 and April 24, 2021.

Night 1 (April 23)
No.	Results	Stipulations
1	Kevin Giza defeated Mance Warner	Ted Petty Invitational Tournament First-round match
2	Zodiak defeated Kellin Craven	Ted Petty Invitational Tournament First-round match
3	Alice Crowley defeated Jessie Belle Smothers	Ted Petty Invitational Tournament First-round match
4	Billy Tipton defeated Hunter Drake	Ted Petty Invitational Tournament First-round match
5	Corey Storm defeated Pompano Joe	Ted Petty Invitational Tournament First-round match
6	Vincent Nothing defeated 1 Called Manders	Ted Petty Invitational Tournament First-round match
7	Nick King defeated Jack Griffin	Ted Petty Invitational Tournament First-round match
8	Tyler Matrix defeated Blake Steel	Ted Petty Invitational Tournament First-round match
9	Logan James defeated Prima Donny	Ted Petty Invitational Tournament First-round match
10	Gnarls Garvin defeated Kevin Lee Davidson	Ted Petty Invitational Tournament First-round match
11	John Wayne Murdoch defeated Kongo Kong	Ted Petty Invitational Tournament First-round match
12	Jake Crist defeated Aaron Williams	Ted Petty Invitational Tournament First-round match

Night 2 (April 24)
No.	Results	Stipulations
1	Tyler Matrix defeated Kevin Giza	Quarter-final match
2	Gnarls Garvin defeated Zodiak	Quarter-final match
3	Alice Crowley defeated Billy Tipton	Quarter-final match
4	Jake Crist defeated Vincent Nothing	Quarter-final match
5	John Wayne Murdoch defeated Nick King	Quarter-final match
6	Logan James defeated Corey Storm	Quarter-final match
7	John Wayne Murdoch defeated Alice Crowley	Semi-final match
8	Jake Crist defeated Gnarls Garvin	Semi-final match
9	Tyler Matrix defeated Logan James	Semi-final match
10	Tyler Matrix defeated Jake Crist and John Wayne Murdoch	Three-way final match for the IWA Mid-South Heavyweight Championship
