= Jimmy Jacobs =

American professional wrestler (born 1984)

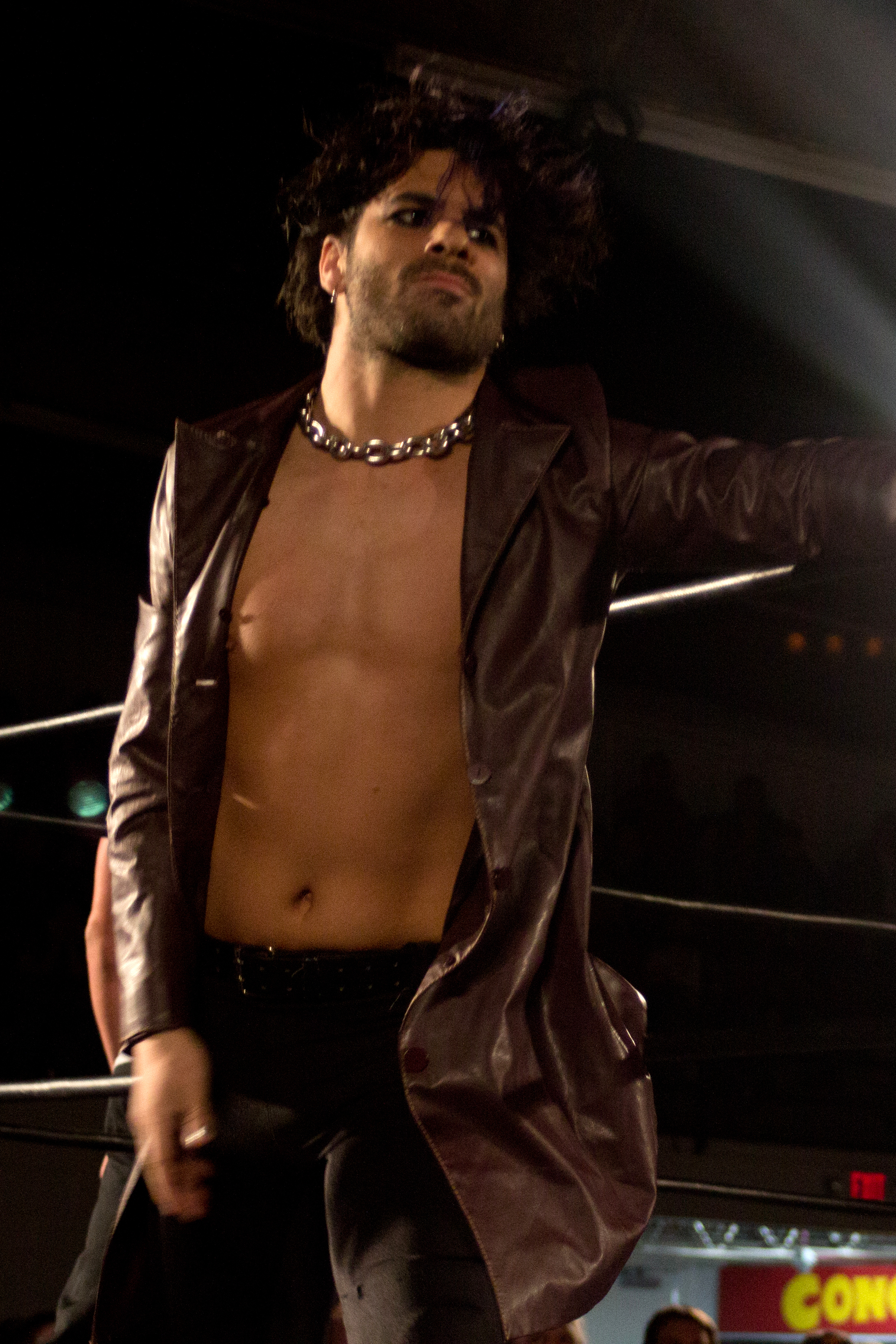
- Jacobs in 2017

Personal information
- Born: Christopher Scoville; February 17, 1984 (age 42) Grand Rapids, Michigan, U.S.

Professional wrestling career
- Ring name: Jimmy Jacobs
- Billed height: 5 ft 7 in (170 cm)
- Trained by: Joe Ortega; Frankie the Face; Truth Martini
- Debut: May 1, 1999

Christopher Scoville (born February 17, 1984), better known by his ring name Jimmy Jacobs, is an American professional wrestler. He is best known for his 12-year career in Ring of Honor (ROH), where he is a five-time ROH World Tag Team Champion. He has also worked for WWE, Impact Wrestling, and All Elite Wrestling (AEW) as a writer and producer.

== Professional wrestling career ==
=== Early career (1999–2002) ===
Scoville first became involved in the wrestling industry in June 1998 as a general assistant for Pro Wrestling Worldwide (PWW), a professional wrestling promotion based in Grand Rapids, Michigan, where his brother, Nick, was working. Scoville spent nine months performing various tasks, including providing color commentary and acting as the company webmaster. After PWW folded, Scoville began working for the Lakeshore Wrestling Organization (LsWO), and was made a referee on March 6, 1999, substituting for a referee who was on [vacation. He began training as a wrestler under veteran Joe "El Tejano" Ortega, a former student of Jose Lothario and the founder of the LsWO, in Holland, Michigan in March 1999, and wrestled his debut match on May 1, 1999, at the age of fifteen as "Jimmy Jacobs", losing to Michael Stryker. Scoville completed his training in August 1999 and went on to wrestle for various independent promotions in the Michigan area on the weekends, while attending high school and working as a furniture mover during the week. After graduating, he attended college for three years before deciding to focus on his wrestling career as a full-time job in May 2005.

=== Independent Wrestling Association Mid-South (2002–2009) ===
From 2002 to 2005, Jacobs worked for Independent Wrestling Association Mid-South (IWA Mid-South). On September 17, 2004, Jacobs defeated Delirious in a ladder match to win the vacant IWA Mid-South Light Heavyweight Championship. On December 12, Delirious defeated Jacobs in a rematch to win the title. On April 1, 2005, Jacobs defeated Danny Daniels to win the IWA Mid-South Heavyweight Championship. At an AAW show on November 26, 2005, Jacobs threw the IWA Mid-South Heavyweight Championship in a garbage can, citing he needed to get paid after the shows he had been scheduled to wrestle on for IWA Mid-South that weekend had been cancelled. On January 21, 2006, he lost the IWA Mid-South World Championship to Arik Cannon and left the promotion. He returned in a surprise appearance on September 30, 2006, and has since made more surprise appearances and had a few matches, however in an "unofficial" capacity. On January 5, 2007, Jacobs wrestled his first match back as he faced his former friend Josh Abercrombie. Jacobs would end up losing that match due to outside interference. On April 12, 2008, Jacobs defeated long-time nemesis B. J. Whitmer in a no-rope, barbed wire match to end their feud. On March 7, 2009, Jacobs defeated Quick Carter Gray to win the IWA Mid-South Light Heavyweight Championship for the second time. On June 5, 2009, Jason Hades defeated Jacobs for the title.

=== Ring of Honor (2003–2015) ===
==== Early appearances and Lacey's Angels (2003–2007) ====
Jacobs joined Ring of Honor (ROH) in 2003 along with rival Alex Shelley with whom he'd feud against or occasionally team with early on in ROH. After Dan Maff left the company, Jacobs formed a tag team with Maff's former partner, B. J. Whitmer. On April 2, 2005, Jacobs and Whitmer defeated Samoa Joe and Jay Lethal for the vacant ROH Tag Team Championship. They lost the title to the Carnage Crew on July 9, 2005, but regained them on July 23. They went on to lose the title again, this time to the team of Sal Rinauro and Tony Mamaluke, on October 1, 2005.

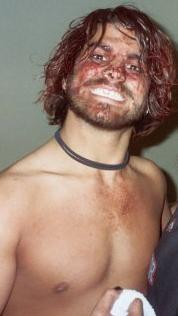
Jacobs shortly after his steel cage match against B. J. Whitmer

Jacobs and Whitmer continued to team as part of Lacey's Angels managed by Lacey. The team broke apart as Jacobs was more concerned with winning Lacey's affections than winning matches. Jacobs would go on to make music videos for ROH professing his love for Lacey. After Jacobs and Whitmer split, the two began feuding in brutal matches. In one match at the Dragon Gate Challenge on March 30, 2006, Whitmer slipped on the top turnbuckle while attempting a super powerbomb that dropped Jacobs head and neck first on the ropes and edge of the ring. The two continued to wrestle several minutes longer. At In Your Face on June 17, 2006, Whitmer super powerbombed Jacobs into the crowd. Jacobs went on to injure Whitmer at Gut Check on August 26, 2006.

It was later revealed in a storyline that Lacey was sleeping with Colt Cabana. Lacey arranged for the two to be a tag team. Cabana left the team because he was annoyed at Lacey, and tried to explain to Jacobs that she was using him. Jacobs seemingly accepted Cabana's explanation, before assaulting him. Whitmer made his way back from injury and continued his issue with Jacobs. When Brent Albright joined Lacey's Angels, their matches soon became tag team matches, where Whitmer and Cabana would face Jacobs and Albright. It later progressed when Daizee Haze joined forces with Whitmer, and Lacey, in turn as the leader of the group, hired an "assassin", Mercedes Martinez. At The Chicago Spectacular: Night 2, Lacey was injured after Whitmer accidentally struck her in the face with a spike when Jacobs moved out of the way. Jacobs would go on to make his third music video (in which he has been described as being "demented") expressing his feelings on her disfigurement.

On March 31, 2007, in his native town of Detroit, Jacobs battled Whitmer in what Pro Wrestling Torch called an instant classic. The two concluded their year-long feud in a steel cage match. Jacobs won the match, but afterwards, it was announced that Jacobs had lost a tooth and torn his anterior cruciate ligament (an injury he previously sustained), and Whitmer had suffered a neck injury. While Jacobs was injured, ROH decided to continue the Lacey-Jacobs storyline with four small vignettes shown on YouTube, detailing a trip that Lacey spent in Chicago with Jacobs; afterward, he accompanied Lacey to the ring for her matches, in which they appeared to have swapped personalities.

In August 2007, Jacobs returned to ROH winning three straight matches by defeating Rhett Titus on August 24, Mitch Franklin on August 25 and Chris Hero on September 14.

==== The Age of the Fall (2007–2009) ====
For months leading into the ROH return to Chicago there were cryptic messages on a blog of a stable entering ROH that was code-named "Project 161". After making a successful return to ROH, Jacobs, the returning Necro Butcher and the debuting Tyler Black attacked the Briscoe Brothers, immediately following their ladder match with Kevin Steen and El Generico, which confirmed that Jacobs was behind Project 161. Jay Briscoe was hung upside from the rigging that was used to hoist the titles from the ladder match and, as Briscoe's blood dripped onto Jacobs, he announced the beginning of the Age of the Fall. The angle was so controversial that ROH decided to remove the footage from the pay-per-view that was being taped at the event. The footage was heavily requested by ROH fans, however, so it was shown on the ROH Videowire for the week of September 15, and a "blood edit" of their debut is featured on the DVD of the event, Man Up. Later on in the event, Black and Jack Evans faced off in a dark match until both Jacobs and Necro Butcher got involved. The Irish Airborne entered the ring to save Evans, which led to a six-man tag team match between The Age of the Fall and the team of Evans and the Irish Airborne. The match ended a no contest as Necro Butcher attacked the referee.

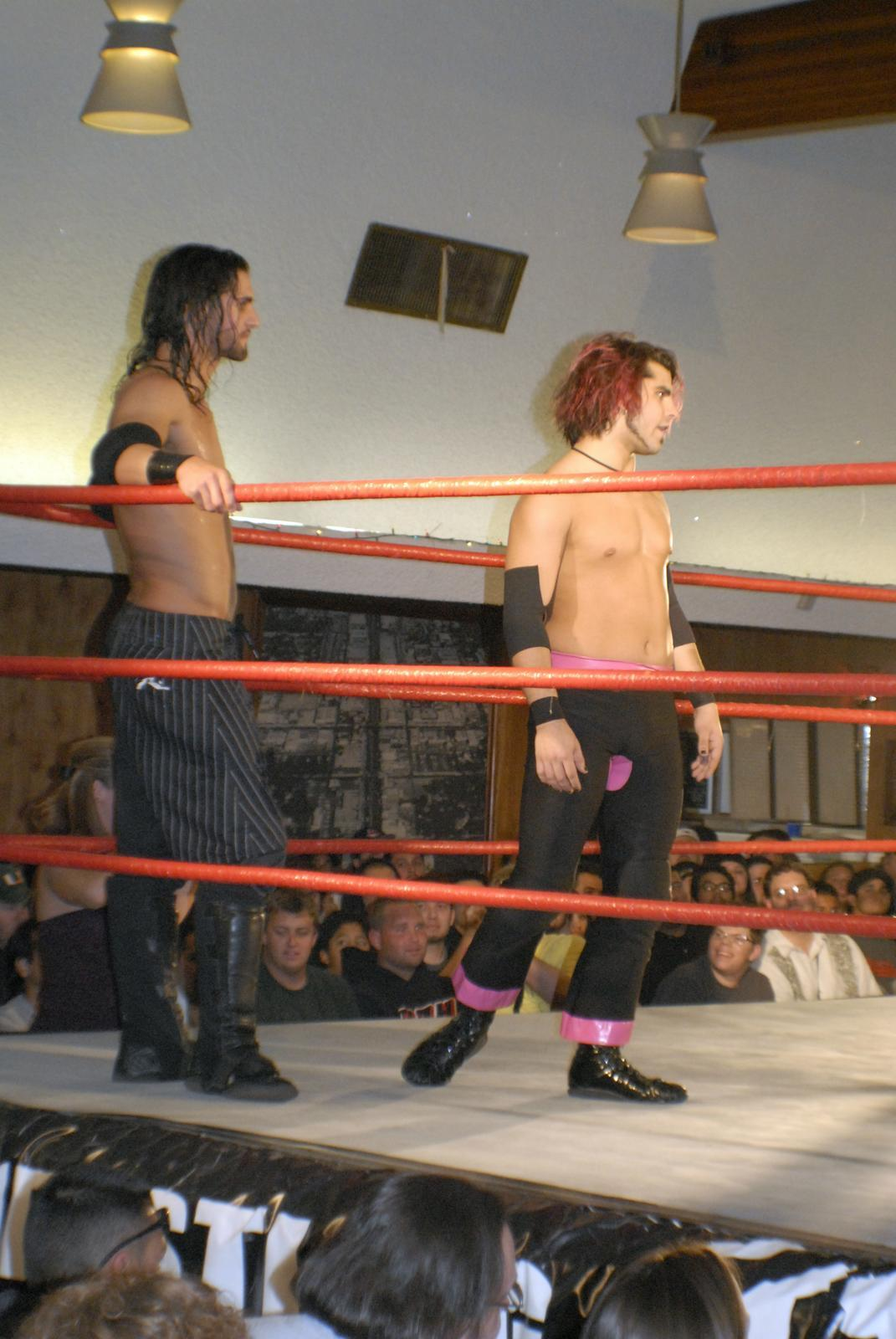
Jacobs (right) and Tyler Black in the ring together at a Pro Wrestling Guerrilla event

The day after their debut, their website revealed that all the blog entries had been written by Black. In an interview with a German website, Jacobs revealed there would be more people involved. This was incorporated into British promotion 3CW in early November when Jacobs was revealed as the newest member of a similar faction in the promotion known as The Lost, managed by Sean David. Jacobs faced Sterling James Keenan on November 11 in a "Street Fight" in Middlesbrough, England.

A woman named Allison Wonderland would also become a follower of Jacobs on November 30, debuting in Dayton during a 4-Way Tag Team Scramble match. At Unscripted III, Jacobs defeated former ROH World Champion Bryan Danielson with his new finisher, the End Time. At Final Battle 2007, Jacobs and Black defeated the Briscoe Brothers to win the ROH World Tag Team Championship. On January 25, 2008, Jacobs teamed with the returning Joey Matthews, the newest member of The Age of the Fall, in a losing effort against Roderick Strong and Rocky Romero of the No Remorse Corps. The following night, Jacobs and Black lost the ROH World Tag Team Championship to the No Remorse Corps' Davey Richards and Romero in an Ultimate Endurance match, also involving Brent Albright and B. J. Whitmer of The Hangmen 3, and Austin Aries and Bryan Danielson. On February 22, 2008, Jacobs introduced Zach Gowen as the newest member of the group. Following the announcement the two of them were defeated by the Vulture Squad of Jigsaw and Ruckus.

The group at this time had an open invitation for Austin Aries to join them, writing blogs and posting YouTube videos about and directed at him. Tammy Lynn Sytch had made a counter offer to Aries of her services (including offering money and sex) against him joining the group. On March 30, 2008, Aries left the ring with Lacey, who was going to 'convince' him, and it was implied that the two had sex. At this show, Rain accompanied the group to the ring, as she has done in Full Impact Pro, because the show was in Florida. On April 19, Aries not only turned down the invitation into the group, Lacey left the group instead, siding with Aries romantically. Jacobs, heartbroken by Lacey leaving him, broke down in the ring to the chants of "Cry, Jimmy, Cry!" from fans and being covered with streamers. Later in the show Jacobs showed signs of a mental breakdown as he hit himself in the head with his trademark spike, to the concern of his fellow group members. The main event was changed as Jacobs pulled out. The Vulture Squad (Ruckus, Jigsaw and Jack Evans) were then beaten by the combination of Matthews, Black and Gowen (who replaced Jacobs). Post match, Jacobs called out Aries and the two brawled, before Aries was attacked Black, Matthews and Gowen. Jacobs went to attack Aries with his spike, but stopped when Lacey begged him not to. On October 25, Jacobs and Aries then had an Anything Goes match where Jacobs won, but lost a Dog Collar match to Aries on November 8, after losing a large amount of blood. In a match set to end the feud, Jacobs lost to Aries in an "I Quit" match at Rising Above. During the match, Lacey returned and almost threw in the towel for Aries, but Aries begged her not to. Lacey then prevented Black from throwing in the towel for Jacobs, forcing Jacobs to say "I Quit".

As a result of the loss to Aries, Jacobs attacked Black at Final Battle 2008 in December. Jacobs and Black continued to feud for several months, and on June 27, Black defeated Jacobs in a steel cage match. Afterwards, over a dozen men dressed in black clothing and black masks climbed into the cage and attacked Black, while Jacobs proclaimed that the Age of the Fall was not over. The following night, after Kenta had defeated Black, Jacobs and his followers attacked Black again and tried to hang him upside down above the ring, but were stopped by Kevin Steen, El Generico and Delirious. They hung Jacobs upside down above the ring, with Black declaring that the Age of the Fall was finished.

During mid-July 2009, it was revealed that Jacobs had left ROH. A video package was shown on Ring of Honor Wrestling, where Jacobs announced that he was leaving, and he later confirmed his departure in an interview on July 14.

==== S.C.U.M. and The Decade (2011–2015) ====
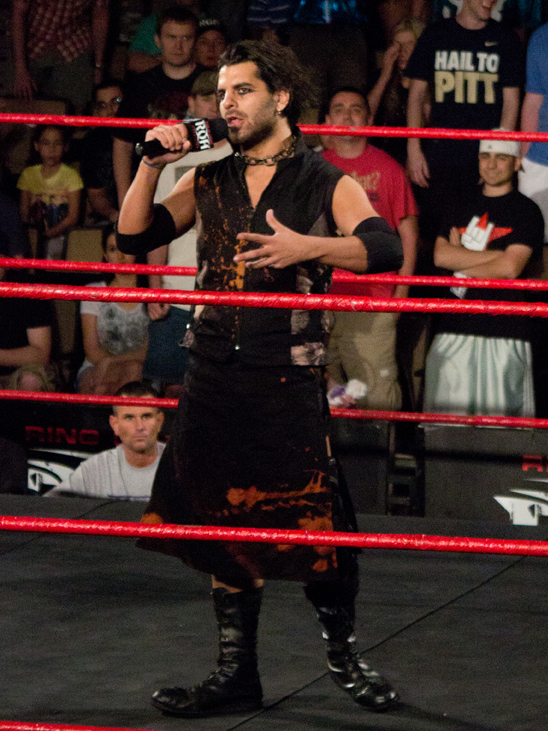
Jacobs at Showdown in the Sun, explaining why he attacked El Generico

Jacobs returned to ROH on May 21, 2011, when he was revealed as Steve Corino's sponsor. At the August 13 tapings of Ring of Honor Wrestling, Jacobs wrestled his first match for ROH in over two years, losing to Mike Bennett. After several months of trying to "purge" himself of evil, Jacobs hinted a heel turn at the 10th Anniversary Show in a No Disqualification match against Kevin Steen, but lost after freezing in shock when he hit Steen with his trademark spike. Later that month, at Showdown in the Sun, Jacobs fully turned heel by helping Steen beat El Generico in a Last Man Standing match on March 30, and beat Generico himself the next night in an impromptu match. On May 12, Jacobs and Steen were joined by Corino to form the S.C.U.M. (Suffering, Chaos, Ugliness, and Mayhem) stable. On September 15 at Death Before Dishonor X: State of Emergency, Jacobs and Corino defeated Charlie Haas and Rhett Titus in the finals of a tournament to win the vacant ROH World Tag Team Championship. They lost the title to the Briscoe Brothers (Jay Briscoe and Mark Briscoe) on December 16 at Final Battle 2012: Doomsday in a three-way match, which also included the team of Caprice Coleman and Cedric Alexander. On June 23, 2013, S.C.U.M. was forced to disband, after being defeated by Team ROH in a Steel Cage Warfare match.

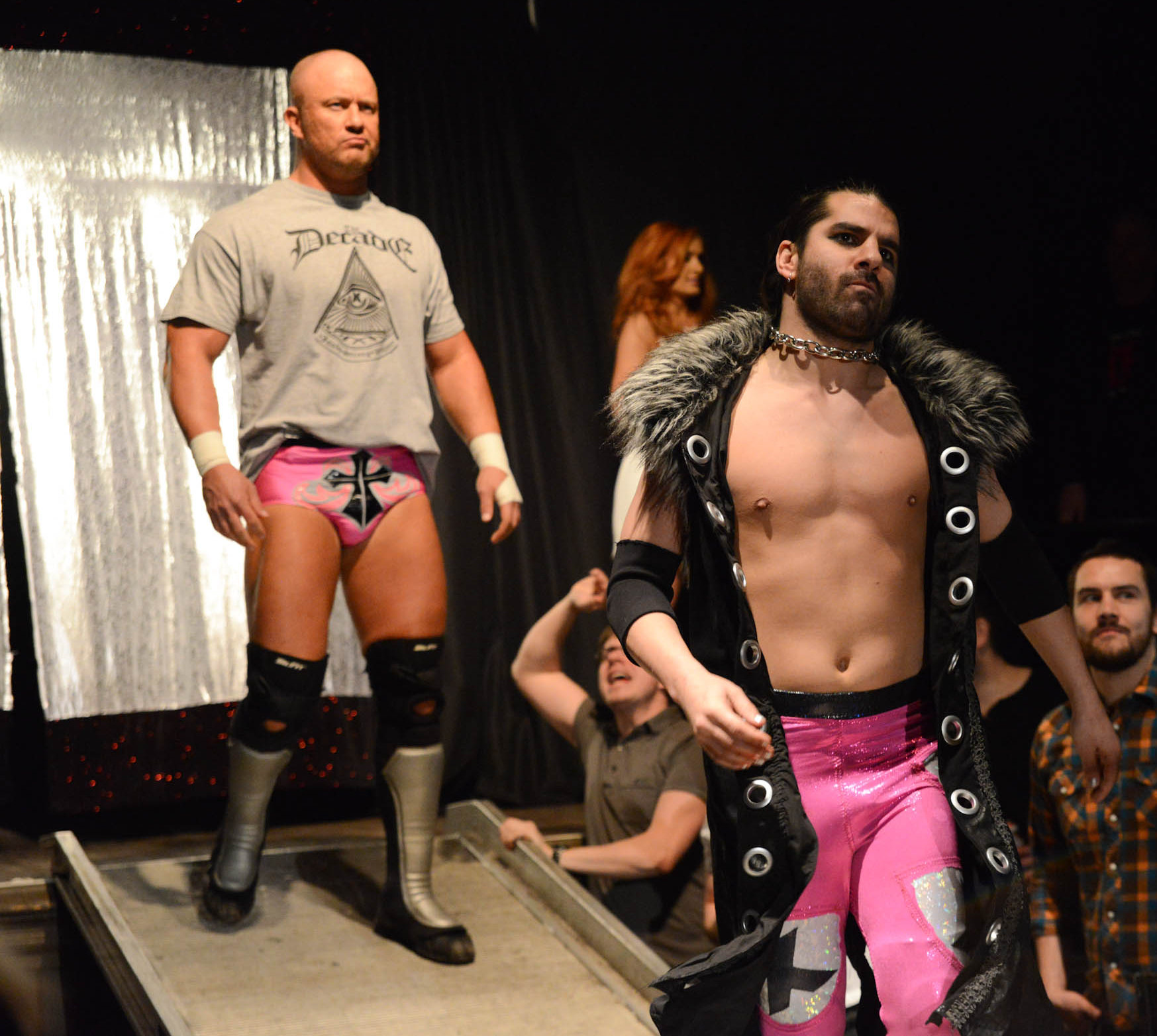
Jacobs (right) with B. J. Whitmer as part of The Decade in March 2014

In September 2013, Jacobs returned to ROH at the request of the retiring B. J. Whitmer, who interceded with Matchmaker Nigel McGuinness on Jacobs' behalf. As part of the storyline, Jacobs was given a five-match series, with the stipulation that if he won at least three of the matches, he would receive a match for the ROH World Championship. Jacobs would go on to win three out of the five matches, and therefore received his title match against ROH World Champion, Adam Cole; however, he was unsuccessful. On December 14, 2013, at Final Battle 2013, Jacobs turned heel again, alongside Whitmer and Roderick Strong; the trio attacked Eddie Edwards, explaining they were sick of people being celebrated for leaving the company, while the constant wrestlers in ROH went unappreciated. The newly formed group went under the name of "The Decade".

Tension arose between Jacobs and Whitmer after Whitmer successfully recruited Colby Corino, the 18-year-old son of Whitmer's rival Steve Corino. On March 28, 2015, Jacobs lost to Whitmer at Supercard of Honor IX, and was attacked by Whitmer and The Decade following the match. Jacobs was saved by Lacey, making her first appearance for the company since 2008, and the two embraced as the "Ballad of Lacey" played. Jacobs also gave a farewell speech.

=== Other promotions (2003–2015) ===
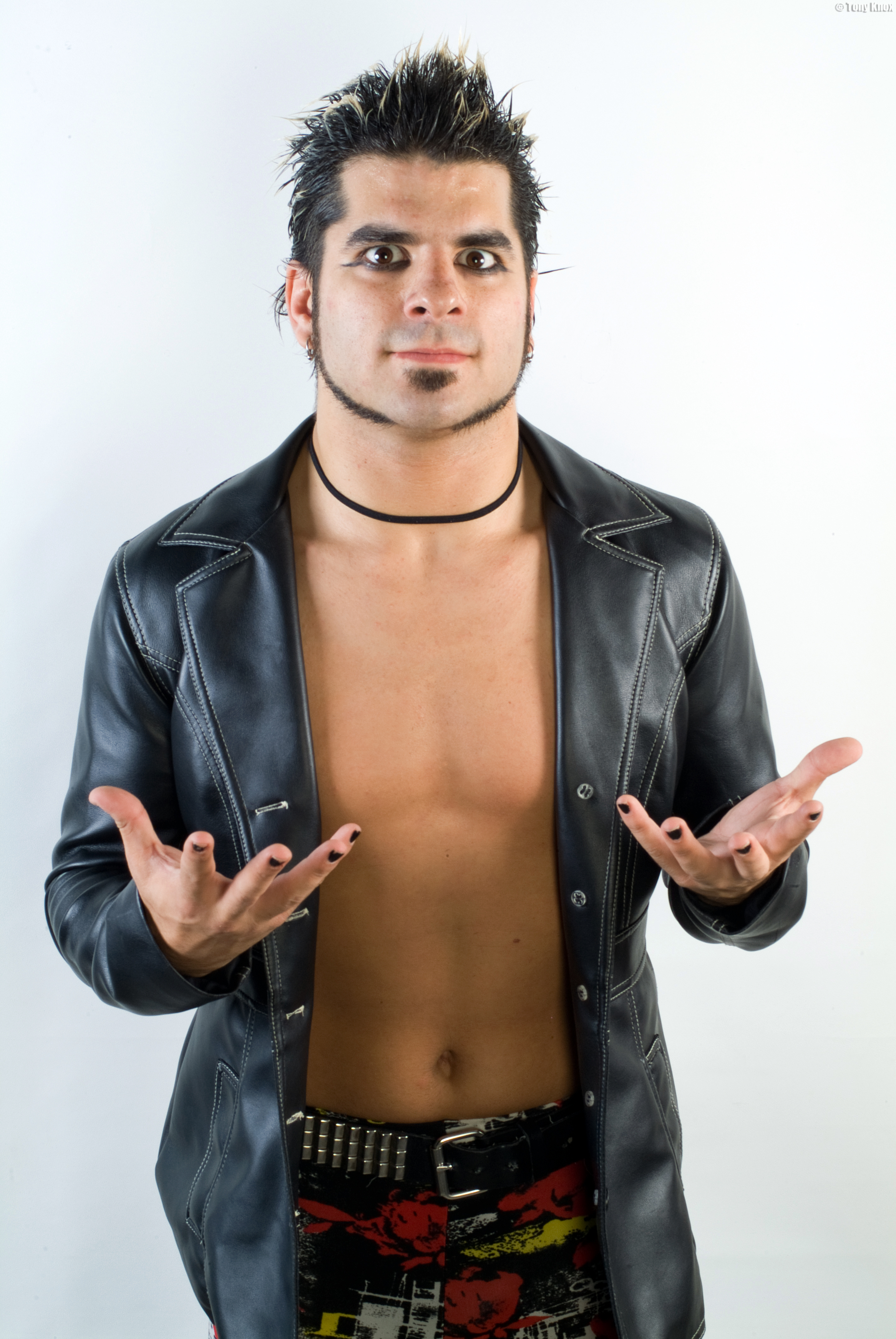
Jacobs in 2009

Throughout 2003 and 2004, Jacobs worked for Combat Zone Wrestling, where he was managed by then-girlfriend Becky Bayless. Jacobs made his first appearance for World Wrestling Entertainment (WWE) on May 10, 2005, when he won a match against Eddie Guerrero via disqualification on SmackDown!. Later in the year, he unsuccessfully challenged Nunzio for the Cruiserweight Championship on Velocity.

Jacobs was part of the first season of Wrestling Society X, a promotion that aired on MTV. He competed as part of an emo tag team with Tyler Black, known as D.I.F.H. (Do It For Her). They mainly competed on the WSX web show WSXtra, where they earned a place in the tag title tournament, which didn't take place as the company folded before it was set to happen in season 2.

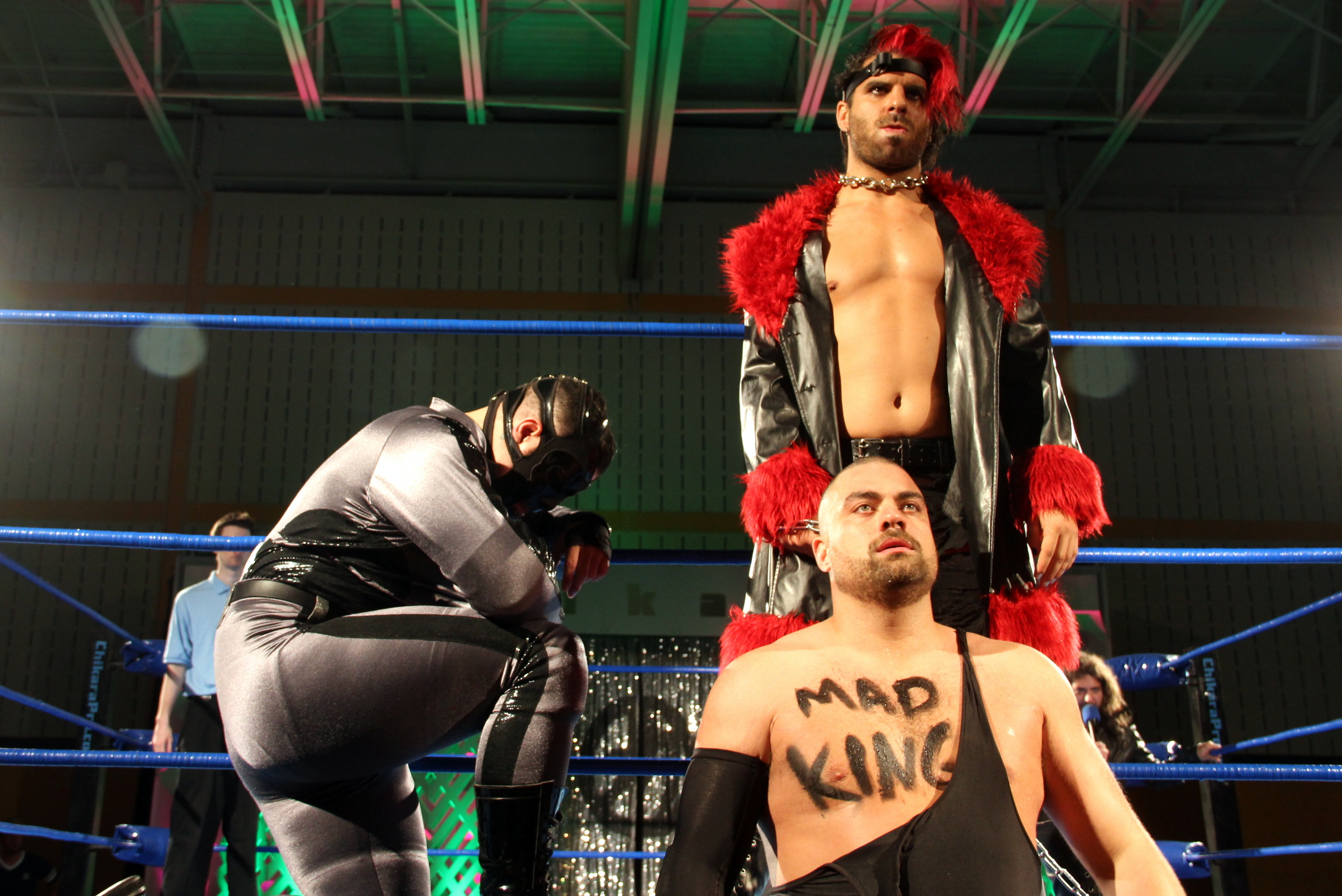
Jacobs (right) with Volgar (left) and Eddie Kingston (bottom) as part of The Flood in Chikara in September 2014

Jacobs made his debut for Insanity Pro Wrestling in Indianapolis, Indiana on August 1, 2009, at Reign Of The Insane Stage 1 in a losing effort to local wrestler Aaron Williams. However, Jacobs would return to the company on March 6, 2010, at A New Age Of Punishment helping Aaron Williams defeat J. C. Bailey. Later that night he would win his first victory in the company, defeating local wrestler Billy Roc. After the match Bailey attacked both Jacobs and Williams however both gained the upper hand on Bailey. IPW Commissioner Brandon Prophet set up a match between Jacobs and Bailey on April 3, 2010, at Uprising however Bailey no showed the event and Jacobs faced Kyle Threat instead gaining his second win in the company. On June 5, 2010, at Desperate Measures Jacobs would go on to defeat Drake Younger. Later in the show after a title match between Aaron Williams and Jon Moxley, Jacobs would attack Moxley causing the locker room to separate both men. After the Show, Jacobs confronted Moxley saying that when he sees Moxley, he sees himself in a mirror. On August 21, 2010, at IPW 9th Anniversary Reign Of The Insane, Jacobs challenged Moxley for the IPW World Heavyweight Championship in a losing effort. On October 2, 2010, Jacobs would go on to defeat Scotty Vortekz at Shocktoberfest to face Jesse Emerson for the number one contendership of the IPW World Heavyweight Championship on November 11, 2010, at the 10TH Annual Super Junior Heavyweight Tournament in a losing effort. On January 1, 2011, at Showdown In Naptown, Jacobs defeated Jon Moxley to win the IPW World Heavyweight Championship in a dog collar match due to referee stoppage. Jacobs would go on to successfully defend the title against Jesse Emerson the next month at Untitled. After the match, The Messiahs of a New Age attacked Jacobs until The Irish Airborne hit the ring to make the save. The next month at Uprising, Jacobs would defeat Dave Crist for the IPW World Title by DQ when the Messiahs interfered in the match. On June 18, 2011, Jacobs vacated the IPW World Title due to a neck injury.

On December 15, 2009, the promotion Evolve posted a video on their YouTube page called "Unknown", hyping someone named "Abstract Wrestler". Over the next two weeks, more videos were posted, until a final video was posted on December 26, revealing that the wrestler was Jacobs. The video confirmed that Jacobs would appear on Evolve's first show on January 16, 2010, at Evolve 1: Ibushi vs Richards. At the event Jacobs defeated Kenn Doane. Jacobs would go on to defeat Johnny Gargano on March 13, 2010, at Evolve 2: Hero vs Hidaka and Brad Allen at Evolve 3: Rise and fall. He suffered his first loss on July 23, 2010, at Evolve 4: Danielson vs Fish, losing to Chuck Taylor.

In February 2012, Jacobs debuted in Pro Wrestling Ohio (since renamed Prime Wrestling), revealing his identity as the mystery man in the ski mask who had attacked and reinjured Johnny Gargano during the prior year. Since joining the Cleveland based promotion, Jacobs won the Prime Wrestling Heavyweight Championship from Matt Cross, only to lose it shortly after to a returning Gargano.

Jacobs debuted in Juggalo Championship Wrestling (JCW) on Insane Clown Posse's 2007 "The Tempest Release Party" tour. Tagging with Josh Abercrombie, he lost to Mad Man Pondo and Necro Butcher. Jacobs competed at Bloodymania that August in a losing effort against Último Dragón. He lost to 2 Tuff Tony at that year's Hallowicked After Party, but defeated Zach Gowen at Big Ballas X-Mas Party. At 2009's Bloodymania III, he lost a match against Ken Shamrock. Jacobs became a full-time member of the roster in 2011. At Flashlight Hysteria, he defeated Sal the Man of a Thousand Gimmicks. Sal later challenged Jacobs to a "Best of Three" match series, with the loser leaving Juggalo Championship Wrestling. Jacobs won the first two matches of the series, successfully forcing Sal out of the company.

Jacobs has also made appearances with Portland-area promotion West Coast Wrestling Connection. He unsuccessfully challenged WCWC Legacy Champion Big Duke for his title in a match aired on WCWC's TV program on KPDX on August 2, 2014.

In mid-2014, Jacobs started working for Chikara as a part of the heel stable "The Flood".

=== WWE (2015–2017) ===
In March 2015, it was reported that Jacobs was joining WWE's creative team as a writer, and he had his first day of work on April 1. On October 11, 2017, it was reported that Jacobs had been let go by WWE for posting a photo on Instagram with members of Bullet Club, during their "invasion" of Raw.

=== Return to the independent circuit (2017–present) ===
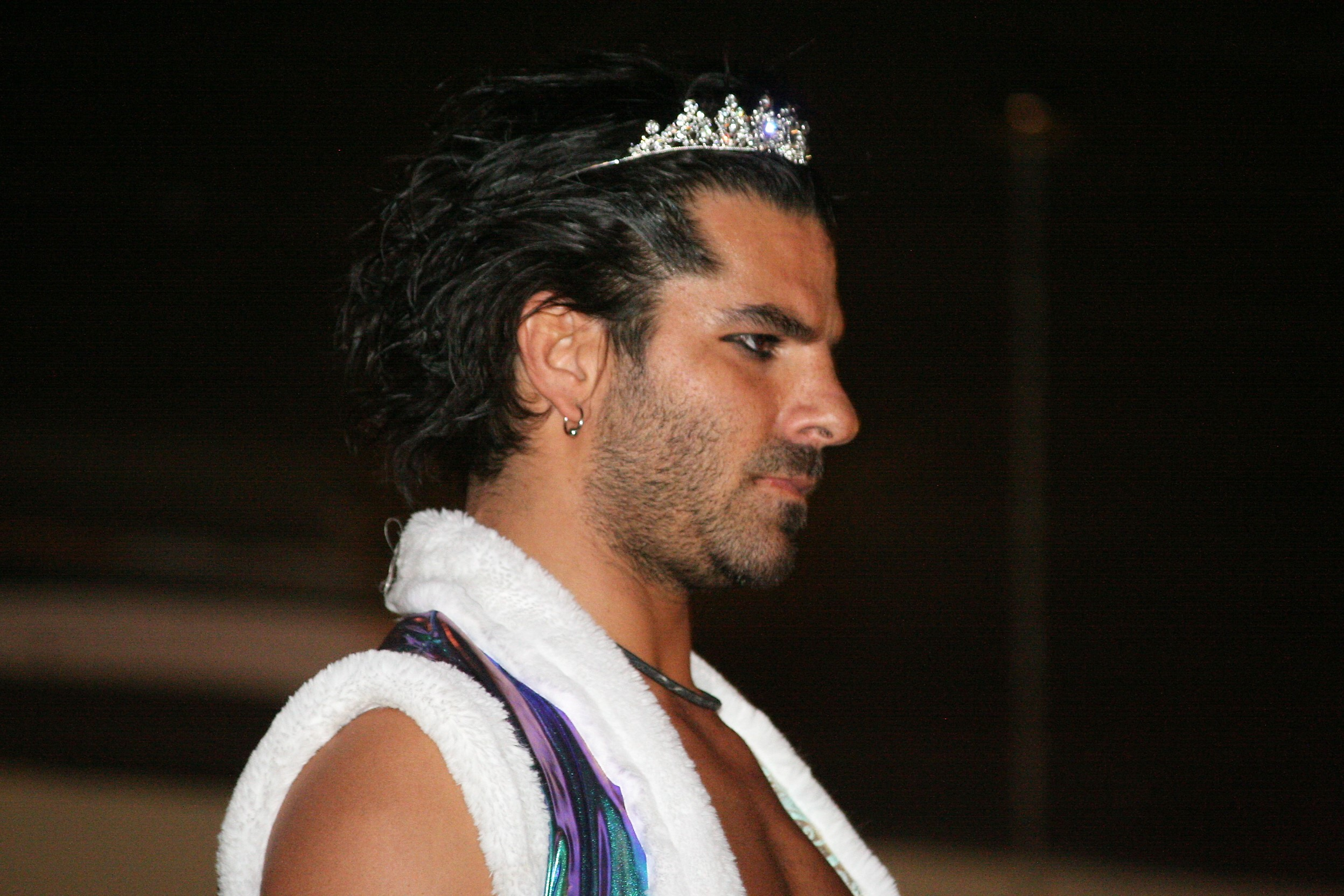
Jacobs under the "Zombie Princess" gimmick in 2017

On October 15, 2017, Jacobs made an appearance in ROH at Global Wars: Chicago. Playing off his firing from WWE, he appeared in the crowd at the end of the show and took another selfie with members of Bullet Club.

On October 28, 2017, Jacobs made his independent circuit return by debuting for WrestleCircus at CircusMania by interrupting Sami Callihan's promo. On November 3, 2017, Jacobs returned to AAW: Professional Wrestling Redefined challenging Rey Fénix to a title match.

It was announced via Twitter that Jacobs would return to Combat Zone Wrestling's Night of Infamy show on November 11, 2017. Jacobs defeated Jimmy Havoc in a match on December 9 at CZW Cage of Death 19.

On March 11, 2018, Jacobs returned to XICW and defeated "GQ" Gavin Quinn to become XICW Midwest Champion

On September 1, 2018, Jacobs participated in the Over Budget Battle Royal at All In.

On September 23, 2021, Jacobs made his debut for GCW's Emo Fight event by singing "The Ballad of Lacey", before being interrupted by Atticus Cogar, leading to the two having a match in the main event where Jacobs won. Afterwards, Lacey appeared and reunited with Jacobs.

=== Impact Wrestling (2017–2023) ===
On November 5, 2017, Jacobs made his Impact Wrestling debut at Bound for Glory. Then, he joined the promotion as an on-air character and backstage producer. He became the manager of Kongo Kong. Later, he would settle in to a role as a member of the creative team.

=== All Elite Wrestling (2023–2024) ===
Jacobs left Impact Wrestling in June 2023 and joined All Elite Wrestling (AEW) as a member of the creative team and producer. In October 2024, it was reported that Jacobs had left AEW.

=== Return to ROH (2024) ===
Jacobs made his return to ROH (now the sister promotion of AEW), for the first time since 2015, in 2023, in a losing effort to Shane Taylor. on the May 23, 2024 edition of Ring of Honor Wrestling, he faced Satnam Singh in a losing effort.

== Championships and accomplishments ==
- Absolute Intense Wrestling
  - AIW Tag Team Championship (1 time) – with B. J. Whitmer
- All American Wrestling
  - AAW Heavyweight Championship (1 time)
  - AAW Heritage Championship (2 times)
  - AAW Tag Team Championship (2 times) – with Tyler Black (1) and Arik Cannon (1)
  - First AAW Triple Crown Championship
  - Allegiance Tag Title Tournament (2013) – with Silas Young
- Extreme Wrestling Federation
  - EWF New Era Championship (1 time)
- Anarchy Championship Wrestling
  - ACW Heavyweight Championship (1 time)
  - Texas Lone Star Classic (2008)
- Border City Wrestling
  - BCW Can-Am Tag Team Championship (1 time) – with Phil Atlas
- Championship Wrestling of Michigan
  - CWM Tag Team Championship (1 time) – with Jimmy Shalwin
- Canadian Wrestling's Elite
  - CWE Championship (1 time)
  - Canadian Unified Junior Heavyweight Championship (1 time)
- Great Canadian Wrestling
  - GCW Ontario Independent Championship (1 time)
  - GCW Ontario Independent Championship Tournament (2006)
- Great Lakes All-Pro Wrestling
  - GLAPW Cruiserweight Championship (1 time)
- Great Lakes Wrestling
  - GLW Cruiserweight Championship (1 time)
- Independent Wrestling Association Mid-South
  - IWA Mid-South Heavyweight Championship (2 times)
  - IWA Mid-South Light Heavyweight Championship (2 times)
- Independent Wrestling Federation of Michigan
  - IWF Michigan Cruiserweight Championship (1 time)
- Independent Wrestling Revolution
  - IWR King of Indies Championship (1 time)
  - IWR Tag Team Championship (1 time) – with Amazing N8
- Indie Wrestling Hall of Fame
  - Class of 2023
- Insanity Pro Wrestling
  - IPW World Heavyweight Championship (1 time)
- Lakeshore Wrestling Organization
  - LSWO Tag Team Championship (2 times) – with Jimmy Shalwin (1) and Gavin Starr (1)
- Midwest Pro Wrestling
  - MPW Universal Championship (1 time)
- Mr. Chainsaw Productions Wrestling
  - MCPW World Heavyweight Championship (1 time)
- National Wrestling Alliance
  - NWA Indiana Heavyweight Championship (1 time)
  - NWA Iowa Heavyweight Championship (1 time)
- Powerhouse Championship Wrestling
  - PCW Light Heavyweight Championship (1 time)
- Pro Wrestling Epic
  - PWE Championship (1 time)
- Price of Glory Wrestling
  - POG Grand Championship (1 time)
  - POG Ultimate Championship (1 time)
- Prime Wrestling
  - Prime Heavyweight Championship (1 time)
- Pro Wrestling Federation
  - PWF Tag Team Championship (1 time) – with The Blitzkrieg Kid
- Insane Championship Wrestling
  - ICW Heavyweight Championship (1 time)
- Pro Wrestling Guerrilla
  - PWG World Tag Team Championship (1 time) – with Tyler Black
- Pro Wrestling Illustrated
  - Ranked No. 50 of the top 500 singles wrestlers in the PWI 500 in 2009
- Ring of Honor
  - ROH World Tag Team Championship (5 times) – with B. J. Whitmer (2), Tyler Black (2), and Steve Corino (1)
  - ROH World Tag Team Championship Tournament (2008) – with Tyler Black
  - ROH World Tag Team Championship Tournament (2012) – with Steve Corino
- Superior Championship Wrestling
  - SCW Bella Strap Championship (1 time)
- Thunder Zone Wrestling
  - TZW Cruiserweight Championship (1 time)
- Revolution Championship Wrestling
  - RCW No Limits Championship (1 time)
- Westside Xtreme Wrestling
  - wXw World Heavyweight Championship (2 times)
- Insane Hardcore Wrestling Entertainment
  - IHWE Heavyweight Championship (1 time)
- Xtreme Intense Championship Wrestling
  - XICW Midwest Heavyweight Championship (4 time)
  - XICW Xtreme Intense Championship (3 times)
  - XICW Light Heavyweight Championship (5 times)
  - XICW Tag Team Championship (1 time) – with Gavin Starr
  - Yukon Braxton Memorial Cup II (2006)
  - Malcolm Monroe Sr. Memorial Cup (2005)
- Northern Impact Wrestling
  - NIW Universal Championship (1 time)
