= Larry D =

American professional wrestler

Personal information
- Born: Lawrence Jones; January 25, 1984 (age 42) Georgetown, Kentucky, U.S.
- Spouse: Paige Jones

Professional wrestling career
- Ring name(s): Legendary Larry D Lawrence D Larry D
- Billed height: 6 ft 0 in (1.83 m)
- Billed weight: 332 lb (151 kg)
- Billed from: Georgetown, Kentucky; Lover's Borough, Kentucky
- Debut: March 21, 2002

Lawrence Jones (born January 25, 1984) is an American professional wrestler and promoter, currently working for independent circuit. He is best known for his time with Impact Wrestling, where he performed under the ring name Larry D. He is also the owner of promotions Generation Next Pro Wrestling (GNPW).

== Professional wrestling career ==
=== Impact Wrestling (2019–2022) ===
On October 19, 2019, Larry D lost to Acey Romero in the main event of Impact Wrestling's All Glory special. On February 22, 2020, at Sacrifice, Romero teamed up with Larry D to defeat oVe (Dave Crist and Madman Fulton).

Larry D solidified his partnership with Romero on the March 31 episode of Impact!, forming a tag team called "XXXL". On the April 14 episode of Impact!, they made their debut in a four-way tag team match against The Rascalz (Dez and Wentz), Reno Scum (Adam Thornstowe and Luster the Legend) and TJP and Fallah Bahh, the latter winning after TJP pinned Thornstowe. The following week on Night 1 of Rebellion, they fought in a three-way tag team match against The Rascalz and TJP and Fallah Bahh, the former winning after Dez pinned Larry D. On the May 5 episode of Impact!, the team picked up their first televised win by defeating oVe. The following months saw XXXL lose matches against the likes of TJP and Fallah Bahh, Reno Scum and The Deaners (Cody and Cousin Jake), the latter of which they beat up after losing to them in their second encounter.

On the July 28 episode of Impact!, Larry D joined with Romero and a bunch of wrestlers in the reality show Wrestle House. On the August 11 episode of Impact!, he was put under a love spell by Rosemary that irked Romero, leading to a match that Larry D won after delivering a knockout punch. During both nights of Emergence, Larry D became infatuated with Rosemary and went on a date, causing John E. Bravo to become jealous and challenge him to a match, which Larry D won. On the September 1 episode of Impact!, XXXL continued their feud with The Deaners by brawling all around the house, ending with Susie confronting Cousin Jake for breaking the truce between the two teams and "winning" the match. Larry D and the rest of the Wrestle House cast returned to the Impact Zone during Knockouts Champion Deonna Purrazzo's Black Tie Affair. On the September 15 episode of Impact!, XXXL continued their Wrestle House rivalry with The Deaners, defeating them in a tag team match. At Victory Road, they faced The Rascalz in a losing effort after Dez landed the Final Flash on Larry D, and failed to beat them again on the October 6 episode of Impact!.

At Bound for Glory, Larry D competed in the Call Your Shot Gauntlet match, where the winner could choose any championship match of their choice, but was eliminated by James Storm. On the October 27 episode of Impact!, XXXL fought against The Rascalz again, this time defeating them. After the match, they entered into a rivalry with the Motor City Machine Guns. In early November, Larry D was one of 10 suspects being investigated for the shooting of John E. Bravo, passing a lie detector test. On the November 24 episode of Impact!, his alter-ego "Lawrence D" confessed to being the one who shot Bravo for taking Rosemary away from him. After XXXL lost to the Motor City Machine Guns on the December 1 episode of Impact!, Larry D was confronted by Bravo for shooting him, with Tommy Dreamer wanting an explanation for his actions but gets attacked. The following week, he was challenged by Dreamer to a match at Final Resolution, where if Larry D won, he's a free man. But if Dreamer won, he has to go to jail for shooting Bravo. At Final Resolution, Larry D lost to Dreamer in an Old School Rules match, resulting in him being handcuffed and taken to jail.

Larry D returned on the January 26, 2021, episode of Impact! and confronted Rosemary for framing him for shooting Bravo, leading to a match between him and Decay member Crazzy Steve that he won the following week. At No Surrender, XXXL teamed with Tenille Dashwood in a six-person tag team match against Decay (Steve, Rosemary and Black Taurus), with Larry D taking the pinfall loss for his team. They would lose a non-title bout against Impact World Tag Team Champions The Good Brothers (Doc Gallows and Karl Anderson) on the February 23 episode of Impact!, and an eight-man tag team match with Reno Scum against The Good Brothers and New Japan Pro-Wrestling's FinJuice (David Finlay and Juice Robinson) the following week. On the March 31 episode of Impact!, Larry D lost to Sami Callihan after a piledriver to the ropes. On May 15, at Under Siege, XXXL competed in a four-way tag team match to determine the number one contender for the Impact World Tag Team Championship, which was won by Ace Austin and Madman Fulton. On October 12, XXXL disbanded after Romero was released by Impact Wrestling.

On the November 25 episode of Impact!, Larry D returned as part of the reality show Wrestle House 2, reverting to his "Lawrence D" alter-ego and was used to make Johnny Swinger jealous by going after one of his Swingerellas. Later in the episode, he lost to Swinger in a match. He made his in-ring return on the December 9 episode of Impact!, where he lost to Rohit Raju by disqualification when Josh Alexander interrupted the match by attacking Raju. On February 1, 2022, Larry D requested his release from Impact Wrestling. Three days later, Impact granted his release and Larry D departed from the company. On the March 10 episode of Impact!, Larry D made a surprise return to the company and confronted Bhupinder Singh, leading to a match the following week where he lost to Singh.

== Championships and accomplishments ==
- IWA Mid-South
  - IWA Mid-South Heavyweight Championship (3 times)
  - Ted Petty Invitational (2019)
- New South Wrestling
  - New South Heavyweight Championship (1 time)
- Northern Wrestling Federation
  - NWF Classic Championship (1 time)
  - NWF Tri-State Championship (1 time)
- Ohio Championship Wrestling
  - OCW Heavyweight Championship (1 time)
- Rockstar Pro Wrestling
  - Rockstar Pro Intergalactic Championship (1 time)
  - Rockstar Pro Trios Captain Championship (1 time)
  - Tournament Of Fight (2018)
- The Wrestling Revolver
  - Revolver Championship (1 time)
- United Wrestling Federation
  - UWF Heavyweight Championship (1 time)
- Prime Time Wrestling
  - PTW Heavyweight Championship (1 time)
  - PTW Tag Team Championship (1 time)
