= IWA Mid-South Heavyweight Championship =

Professional wrestling championship

IWA World Championship

Details
- Promotion: Independent Wrestling Association Mid-South
- Date established: April 3, 1997
- Date retired: June 14, 2022

Other name
- IWA Mid-South Heavyweight Championship (1997–2018)
Statistics
- First champion: Tower of Doom
- Final champion: Jake Crist
- Most reigns: Aaron Williams and Ian Rotten (8 reigns)
- Longest reign: Dingo (518 days)
- Shortest reign: John Wayne Murdoch and Aaron Williams (<1 day)
- Oldest champion: Tracy Smothers (54 years, 34 days)
- Heaviest champion: Tower Of Doom (418 lb)

The IWA World Championship is the major title in the IWA Mid-South based in Louisville, Kentucky. The title debuted at the "Crowning of a Champion" event on April 3, 1997, when Tower of Doom won a twelve-man tournament. There have been a total of 125 reigns among 59 champions and 19 vacancies. Tower of Doom was the inaugural champion, having defeated Ox Harley and Bull Pain in a tournament final three-way match on April 4, 1997, at Crowning of Champion. On June 14, 2022, Jake Crist vacated the title after failing to receive payment. As a result, the company ceased operations and the title was deactivated.

== Title history ==
Key
No.	Overall reign number
Reign	Reign number for the specific champion
Days	Number of days held
<1	Reign lasted less than a day

No.	Champion	Championship change			Reign statistics		Notes	Ref.
No.	Champion	Date	Event	Location	Reign	Days	Notes	Ref.
1	Tower Of Doom	April 3, 1997	IWA Crowing Of A Champion	Louisville, KY	1	21	Defeated Ox Harley and Bull Pain in a tournament final three-way match to become inaugural champion.	
2	Doug Gilbert	April 24, 1997	IWA Mid-South Tapings	Louisville, KY	1	86		
—	Vacated	July 19, 1997	IWA Extreme Heaven 1997	Louisville, KY	—	—		
3	Ian Rotten	July 19, 1997	IWA Extreme Heaven 1997	Louisville, KY	1	12	Defeated Bull Pain in a No Ropes Barbed Wire match to win the vacated title.	
4	Bull Pain	July 31, 1997	IWA Mid-South Tapings	Louisville, KY	1	42		
5	Tracy Smothers	September 11, 1997	IWA Mid-South Tapings	Louisville, KY	1	7		
6	Salvatore Sincere	September 18, 1997	IWA Mid-South Tapings	Louisville, KY	1	47		
7	Bull Pain	November 4, 1997	IWA Mid-South 1st Anniversary Show	Louisville, KY	2	3	This was a three-way match, also involving Tracy Smothers.	
8	Buddy Landel	November 7, 1997	IWA Mid-South Tapings	Lexington, KY	1	1		
9	Bull Pain	November 8, 1997	IWA Mid-South Tapings	Bardstown, KY	3	3		
—	Vacated	November 11, 1997	IWA Mid-South Tapings	Louisville, KY	—	—	Title was vacated following a match between Bull Pain and Paul Diamond which ended in a double pinfall.	
10	Bull Pain	December 9, 1997	IWA Mid-South Tapings	Bardstown, KY	4	66	Defeated Paul Diamond in a rematch for the vacant title.	
11	Axl Rotten	February 13, 1998	IWA Mid-South Tapings	Lexington, KY	1	70		
—	Vacated	April 24, 1998	IWA Heavyweight Title Tournament	Louisville, KY	—	—		
12	Ox Harley	April 24, 1998	IWA Heavyweight Title Tournament	Louisville, KY	1	34	Defeated Harry Palmer in a tournament final to win the vacated title.	
13	The Midnight Rider	May 28, 1998	IWA Mid-South Tapings	Louisville, KY	2	45	Tower Of Doom replaced Ox Harley in this title defence, occasion granted by the authority. The Midnight Rider was a certain gimmick of Ian Rotten.	
14	Billy Joe Eaton	July 12, 1998	House show	Kalamazoo, MI	1	18		
15	Ian Rotten	July 30, 1998	IWA Extreme Heaven 1998	Louisville, KY	3	7		
16	Harry Palmer	August 6, 1998	IWA Mid-South Tapings	Louisville, KY	1	99		
17	Corporal Robinson	November 13, 1998	IWA Mid-South Tapings	West Point, KY	1	21		
18	Ian Rotten	December 4, 1998	IWA Mid-South Tapings	Salem, IN	4	33		
19	Corporal Robinson	January 6, 1999	IWA Mid-South Tapings	Charlestown, IN	2	1		
20	Ian Rotten	January 7, 1999	IWA Mid-South Tapings	Louisville, KY	5	7	This was a title for title match, also contested for Rotten's MAW Heavyweight Championship.	
21	Suicide Kid	January 14, 1999	IWA Mid-South Tapings	Louisville, KY	1	7		
22	Chip Fairway	January 21, 1999	IWA Mid-South Tapings	Louisville, KY	1	7		
23	Suicide Kid	January 28, 1999	IWA Mid-South Tapings	Louisville, KY	2	5		
—	Vacated	February 2, 1999	IWA Mid-South Tapings	Louisville, KY	—	—	Title held up by Ian Rotten following a Two Out Of Three Falls match between Suicide Kid and Chip Fairway due to several interferences.	
24	Chip Fairway	February 3, 1999	IWA Mid-South Tapings	Charlestown, IN	2	85	Defeated Suicide Kid in a ladder match to win the vacated title.	
25	Ian Rotten	April 29, 1999	IWA Showdown in Salem	Salem, IN	6	100	Defeated Dean Baldwin who replaced Chip Fairway in the title defence.	
26	Rollin' Hard	August 7, 1999	IWA Hardcore Throwdown	Oolitic, IN	1	53		
27	Mad Man Pondo	September 29, 1999	House show	Louisville, KY	1	147		
28	2 Tuff Tony	February 23, 2000	IWA Mid-South Tapings	Charlestown, IN	1	31	This was a Fans bring the weapons match. On March 4, 2 Tuff Tony defeated reigning Hardcore Champion Delilah Starr and Mad Man Pondo in a two-on-one handicap match to unify the IWA Mid-South Hardcore Championship and IWA Mid-South Heavyweight Championship.	
29	Blaze	March 25, 2000	IWA The Out Back Brawl	Charlestown, IN	1	7	This was a Falls Count Anywhere match.	
30	Axl Rotten	April 1, 2000	IWA No Jokes, Just Pain	Charlestown, IN	2	0–70	This was a Lumberjack Strap match. The length of this reign is uncertain.	
—	Vacated	April – June 2000	—	—	—	—	The title was vacated somewhere between April and June due to unknown circumstances.	
31	Rollin' Hard	June 6, 2000	House show	Charlestown, IN	2	18	Defeated Ian Rotten in a tournament final for the vacated title.	
32	Ian Rotten	June 24, 2000	IWA No Blood No Guts No Glory 2	Charlestown, IN	7	7	This was a Four corners of pain salt match.	
33	Rollin' Hard	July 1, 2000	IWA Heroes, Hurt & Hot Wax	Charlestown, IN	3	30	This was a Four corners of pain match.	
34	Mitch Page	July 31, 2000	House show	Charlestown, IN	1	5	Awarded the title by Ian Rotten due to Rollin' Hard's inability to defend the title due to injury.	
35	Bull Pain	August 5, 2000	IWA From Hardcore Hell And Back 2000	Charlestown, IN	5	35		
—	Vacated	September 9, 2000	House show	Charlestown, IN	—	—	Bull Pain was stripped off the title due to failing to show up to a title defence.	
36	Harry Palmer	September 22, 2000	IWA Heavyweight Title Tournament	Charlestown, IN	2	1	Defeated Cash Flo in a tournament final to win the vacated title.	
—	Vacated	September 23, 2000	House show	Charlestown, IN	—	—		
37	Harry Palmer	September 27, 2000	IWA Mid-South Tapings	Charlestown, IN	3	16	Cash Flo and Rollin' Hard in a Belt On A Pole three-way match to win the vacated title.	
38	Suicide Kid	October 13, 2000	IWA Mid-South 4th Anniversary Show	Charlestown, IN	3	8		
—	Vacated	October 21, 2000	King Of The Death Matches 2000	Charlestown, IN	—	—	Title was held up after a controversial ending of a match against Todd Morton.	
39	Todd Morton	October 25, 2000	IWA Mid-South Tapings	Charlestown, IN	1	42	Defeated Suicide Kid in a ladder match to win the vacated title.	
40	Ian Rotten	December 6, 2000	IWA Mid-South Tapings	Charlestown, IN	8	24		
41	Cash Flo	December 30, 2000	IWA For The Love Of Money	Charlestown, IN	1	63		
42	Blaze	February 7, 2001	House show	Charlestown, IN	2	24		
43	2 Tuff Tony	March 3, 2001	IWA Nightmare on Highway 62	Charlestown, IN	2	35		
44	Mitch Page	April 7, 2001	IWA April Bloodshowers 2001	Charlestown, IN	2	42	This was a three-way match, also involving Rollin' Hard.	
45	Trent Baker	May 19, 2001	IWA Mid-South Tapings	Charlestown, IN	1	56		
46	Hido	July 14, 2001	IWA Mid-South Tapings	Charlestown, IN	1	60	This was a three-way match, also involving Chip Fairway.	
—	Vacated	July 18, 2001	IWA Mid-South Tapings	Charlestown, IN	—	—	Title was vacated after Hido's loss to Necro Butcher in a Loser leaves town match.	
47	Suicide Kid	July 21, 2001	IWA Heavyweight Title Tournament	Charlestown, IN	4	14	Defeated Mitch Page in a Fans Bring The Weapons Falls Count Anywhere matchtournament final to win the vacated title.	
48	Trent Baker	August 4, 2001	House show	Charlestown, IN	2	77		
49	Chris Hero	October 20, 2001	IWA Mid-South 5th Anniversary Show	Charlestown, IN	1	46		
50	CM Punk	December 5, 2001	IWA Mid-South Tapings	Indianapolis, IN	1	86		
51	Eddie Guerrero	March 1, 2002	IWA Spring Heat	Indianapolis, IN	1	1	This was a three-way match, also involving Rey Mysterio.	
52	CM Punk	March 2, 2002	IWA Morris Mayhem	Morris, IL	2	48		
53	Colt Cabana	April 19, 2002	IWA Mid-South Tapings	Dayton, OH	1	84	This was a three-way match, also involving Eddie Guerrero.	
54	Chris Hero	July 12, 2002	IWA King Of The Death Matches 2002	Clarksville, IN	2	85		
55	M-Dogg 20	October 5, 2002	IWA Mid-South 6th Anniversary Show	Clarksville, IN	1	21		
56	CM Punk	October 26, 2002	IWA Mid-South Tapings	Clarksville, IN	3	7	This was a four-way gauntlet match, also involving Bull Pain, Danny Daniels, Ian Rotten and Necro Butcher.	
57	B. J. Whitmer	November 2, 2002	IWA Ted Petty Invitational 2002	Clarksville, IN	1	42	This was the final of the Ted Petty invitational tournament.	
58	CM Punk	December 14, 2002	IWA Mid-South Tapings	Clarksville, IN	4	55		
59	Chris Hero	February 7, 2003	"When Hero Met Punk"	Clarksville, IN	3	120	This was a Two Out Of Three Falls match.	
60	Mark Wolf	June 7, 2003	IWA When Good Friends Go Bad	Clarksville, IN	1	35		
—	Vacated	July 12, 2003	IWA Mid-South Tapings	Charlestown, IN	—	—	Title was vacated due to Wolf suffering multiple legitimate injuries.	
61	Chris Hero	June 12, 2003	IWA Mid-South Tapings	Clarksville, IN	4	21	Defeated Danny Daniels in a Two Out Of Three Falls match to win the vacated title.	
62	Danny Daniels	August 2, 2003	IWA King Of The Death Matches 2003	Clarksville, IN	1	167	This was a Texas deathmatch.	
63	Jerry Lynn	January 16, 2004	IWA A Matter Of Pride	Oolitic, IN	1	84		
64	B. J. Whitmer	April 9, 2004	IWA April Bloodshowers 2004	Oolitic, IN	2	50	This was a 30-minute Iron Man match.	
65	Petey Williams	May 29, 2004	IWA A Shot Of Southern Comfort	Highland, IN	1	112		
66	Arik Cannon	September 18, 2004	IWA Ted Petty Invitational 2004	Highland, IN	1	145		
—	Vacated	October 21, 2004	IWA Autumn Armageddon	Evansville, IN	—	—	Title vacated after Cannon suffered a broken collarbone injury.	
67	A.J. Styles	October 21, 2004	IWA Autumn Armageddon	Evansville, IN	1	2	Defeated Petey Williams, Christopher Daniels and Chris Sabin in a four-way match to win the vacated title.	
68	CM Punk	October 23, 2004	IWA Mid-South 8th Anniversary Show: Dreams Do Come True	Highland, IN	5	104		
69	Danny Daniels	February 4, 2005	IWA Indiana State Title Tournament	Valparaiso, IN	2	56		
70	Jimmy Jacobs	April 1, 2005	IWA April Bloodshowers 2005	Herrin, IL	1	295		
71	Arik Cannon	January 21, 2006	IWA No Retreat... No Surrender	Midlothian, IL	2	91	This was a Falls Count Anywhere match.	
72	Darin Corbin	April 22, 2006	IWA Any Given Saturday	Midlothian, IL	1	42		
73	Trik Davis	June 3, 2006	IWA King Of The Death Matches 2006	Plainfield, IN	1	14	This was a three-way elimination match, also involving Arik Cannon.	
74	Toby Klein	June 17, 2006	IWA School's Out	Streamwood, IL	1	105	Toby Klein won a Call your shot battle royal by lastly eliminating Chris Hero the previous night and cashed in his opportunity on Trik Davis.	
75	Chuck Taylor	September 30, 2006	IWA Ted Petty Invitational 2006	Midlothian, IL	1	364		
76	Mike Quackenbush	September 29, 2007	IWA Ted Petty Invitational 2007	Midlothian, IL	1	69	This was a three-way match in the finals of the Ted Petty Invitational, also involving Claudio Castagnoli, where Quackenbush's IWA Mid-South Light Heavyweight Championship was also on the line.	
77	Eddie Kingston	December 17, 2007	IWA A Rotten Farewell	Plainfield, IL	1	127	This was a Four Corners Elimination match, also involving Chris Hero and Chuck Taylor, where Taylor also won Quackenbush's IWA Mid-South Light Heavyweight Championship.	
—	Vacated	April 12, 2008	IWA April Blood Showers 2008	Joliet, IL	—	—	IWA Mid-South promoter Ian Rotten declared the title vacant due to Eddie Kingston missing two consecutive events due to flight problems.	
78	Chuck Taylor	May 3, 2008	IWA A Night Of Champions	Joliet, IL	2	48	Defeated Claudio Castagnoli in an eight-man one-night tournament final to win the vacated title.	
79	Dingo	June 20, 2008	IWA King Of The Death Matches 2008	Sellersburg, IN	1	518		
—	Vacated	November 20, 2009	IWA Chapter 2: In The Beginning	Addison, IL	—	—	Dingo vacated the title after sustaining a broken neck a month prior. The title have been inactive for almost five years since then.	
80	Kongo Kong	June 29, 2014	IWA Suicidal Tendencies 2014	Clarksville, IN	1	336	Defeated Hy-Zaya in a tournament final to win the vacated title.	
81	Hy-Zaya	May 31, 2015	IWA Bad Intentions 2015	New Albany, IN	1	103		
82	Shane Mercer	September 11, 2015	IWA Home Sweet Home	Clarksville, IN	1	28		
83	John Wayne Murdoch	October 9, 2015	IWA Mid-South 19th Anniversary Show	Clarksville, IN	1	<1		
84	Reed Bentley	October 9, 2015	IWA Home Sweet Home	Clarksville, IN	1	49		
85	John Wayne Murdoch	November 27, 2015	IWA Young Guns Shoot Out	Clarksville, IN	2	7	This was a Texas deathmatch.	
86	Reed Bentley	December 4, 2015	IWA Unfinished Business	Clarksville, IN	2	7		
87	Kongo Kong	December 11, 2015	IWA Ted Petty Invitational 2015	Clarksville, IN	2	142		
88	Reed Bentley	May 1, 2016	IWA Derby Madness 2016	New Albany, IN	3	67		
89	John Wayne Murdoch	July 7, 2016	IWA The Star Spangled Spectacular	Clarksville, IN	3	<1		
90	JJ Garrett	July 7, 2016	IWA The Star Spangled Spectacular	Clarksville, IN	1	91		
91	Tracy Smothers	October 6, 2016	IWA Mid-South 20th Anniversary Show	Clarksville, IN	2	77	Owner and operator of rival promotion D1W (Destination One Wrestling) interfered and cost Garrett the Championship and proclaimed it as the D1W Championship, although it was never officially sanctioned as it.	
92	Mitch Page	December 22, 2016	IWA Winter Tryout Show	Jeffersonville, IN	3	<1		
—	Vacated	December 22, 2016	IWA Winter Tryout Show	Jeffersonville, IN	—	—	Title was vacated due to Mitch Page retiring from wrestling.	
93	John Wayne Murdoch	January 5, 2017	IWA Out With The Old, In With The New 2017	Jeffersonville, IN	4	51	Defeated Aaron Williams in a tournament final to win the vacated title.	
94	Dave Crist	February 25, 2017	IWA Ruler Of Men	Memphis, IN	1	73		
—	Vacated	May 9, 2017	—	—	—	—	Title was vacated due to Dave Crist suffering an injury.	
95	Aaron Williams	May 25, 2017	IWA The Champ Is Here	Jeffersonville, IN	1	<1	Defeated Larry D in a tournament final to win the vacated title.	
96	Larry D	May 25, 2017	IWA The Champ Is Here	Jeffersonville, IN	1	7	Williams successfully cashed in his Opportunity In A Box contract.	
97	Michael Elgin	June 1, 2017	IWA Ian Rotten Birthday Bash	Jeffersonville, IN	1	92		
—	Vacated	September 1, 2017	—	—	—	—	Title was vacated due to unknown circumstances.	
98	Aaron Williams	September 9, 2017	IWA Crowning A Champion 2017	Jeffersonville, IN	2	75	Defeated Dingo in a tournament final to win the vacated title.	
99	Jimmy Jacobs	November 23, 2017	IWA Bloodfeast 2017	Memphis, IN	2	44		
—	Vacated	January 4, 2018	—	—	—	—	Title was vacated due to Jacobs suffering an injury.	
100	Mance Warner	January 11, 2018	IWA No Easy Road To The Crown	Memphis, IN	1	7	Defeated Ace Perry in a tournament final to win the vacated title.	
101	Jake Crist	January 18, 2018	IWA 800th Show	Memphis, IN	1	1		
102	Aaron Williams	January 19, 2018	IWA A Hard Day's Night	Memphis, IN	3	13		
103	Mance Warner	February 1, 2018	We Are IWA	Memphis, IN	2	70	This was a three-way elimination match, also involving Jake Crist.	
104	Calvin Tankman	April 12, 2018	House show	Memphis, IN	1	21		
105	John Wayne Murdoch	May 3, 2018	IWA Mid-South Spring Heat 2018	Memphis, IN	5	16		
106	Nick Gage	May 19, 2018	House show	Memphis, IN	1	104		
—	Vacated	August 31, 2018	IWA A Labor Of Love	Memphis, IN	—	—	Title was vacated due to unknown circumstances.	
107	Michael Elgin	August 31, 2018	IWA A Labor Of Love	Memphis, IN	2	22		
108	Aaron Williams	September 22, 2018	IWA Ted Petty Invitational 2018	Indianapolis, IN	4	40		
109	Logan James	November 1, 2018	IWA November Pain	Jeffersonville, IN	1	21		
110	Aaron Williams	November 22, 2018	IWA Wrestlefeast 2018	Indianapolis, IN	5	103		
111	Larry D	March 5, 2019	IWA 900th Show	Jeffersonville, IN	1	107		
112	Kongo Kong	June 20, 2019	IWA This is Us	Jeffersonville, IN	3	85		
113	Aaron Williams	September 13, 2019	IWA Ted Petty Invitational 2019	Jeffersonville, IN	6	<1	This was a three-way match also involving Matthew Justice.	
114	Larry D	September 13, 2019	IWA Ted Petty Invitational 2019	Jeffersonville, IN	3	65	This was the final of the Ted Petty Invitational Tournament.	
115	Kevin Giza	November 17, 2019	IWA She's Still Amazing	Jeffersonville, IN	1	67		
116	Aaron Williams	January 23, 2020	IWA No Retreat No Surrender 2020	Jeffersonville, IN	7	42		
117	Ace Perry	March 5, 2020	IWA Let The Madness Begin	Jeffersonville, IN	1	148		
118	Jake Crist	July 31, 2020	IWA King of Death Matches 2020	Jeffersonville, IN	2	251	This was a three-way match also involving Kevin Giza.	
119	John Wayne Murdoch	April 8, 2021	IWTV Family Reunion 2021 Part 1	Tampa, FL	6	7		
—	Vacated	April 15, 2021	IWA Spring Fever 2021	Jeffersonville, IN	—	—	Title was vacated after Murdoch won the IWA Mid-South Tag Team Championship with Jake Crist.	
120	Tyler Matrix	April 24, 2021	IWA Ted Petty Invitational Tournament 2021	Jeffersonville, IN	1	61	This was a three-way tournament final match also involving Jake Crist and John Wayne Murdoch for the vacant title.	
121	Logan James	June 24, 2021	You're It!	Jeffersonville, IN	2	35	This was a Ladder match.	
122	Tyler Matrix	July 29, 2021	Prelude To Death	Jeffersonville, IN	2	31		
123	Aaron Williams	August 29, 2021	Mid-South Put Up Or Shut Up	Indianapolis, IN	8	13		
124	Tyler Matrix	September 11, 2021	Ted Petty Invitational 2021	Jeffersonville, IN	3	<1	This was a Ted Petty Invitational semi-final match.	
125	Jake Crist	September 11, 2021	Ted Petty Invitational 2021	Jeffersonville, IN	3	276	This was a Ted Petty Invitational final match.	
—	Deactivated	June 14, 2022	—	—	—	—	Crist vacated the title after he failed to receive payment. The promotion ceased operations as a result.	

== Combined reigns ==
As of March 15, 2026.

†	Indicates the current champion
¤	The exact length of at least one title reign is uncertain.

Rank	Wrestler	No. of reigns	Combined days
1	Kongo Kong	3	563
2	Dingo	1	518
3	Chuck Taylor	2	412
4	Jimmy Jacobs	2	339
5	CM Punk	5	300
6	Aaron Williams	8	293
7	Jake Crist	3	284
8	Chris Hero	4	272
9	Ian Rotten	8	235
10	Danny Daniels	2	223
11	Larry D	3	169
12	Bull Pain	5	149
13	Ace Perry	1	148
14	Mad Man Pondo	1	147
15	Trent Baker	2	133
16	Eddie Kingston	1	127
17	Arik Cannon	2	124
18	Reed Bentley	3	123
19	Harry Palmer	3	116
20	Michael Elgin	2	114
20	Mance Warner	2	114
22	Petey Williams	1	112
23	Toby Klein	1	105
24	Nick Gage	1	104
25	Hy-Zaya	1	103
26	Rollin' Hard	3	97
27	B. J. Whitmer	2	92
27	Chip Fairway	2	92
27	Tyler Matrix	3	92
30	JJ Garrett	1	91
31	Doug Gilbert	1	86
32	Colt Cabana	1	84
32	Jerry Lynn	1	84
32	Tracy Smothers	2	84
35	John Wayne Murdoch	6	81
36	Dave Crist	1	73
37	Axl Rotten	2	¤70–140
38	Mike Quackenbush	1	69
39	Kevin Giza	1	67
40	2 Tuff Tony	2	66
41	Logan James	2	56
42	Mitch Page	3	47
42	Salvatore Sincere	1	47
44	Darin Corbin	1	42
44	Todd Morton	1	42
46	Cash Flo	1	39
47	Mark Wolf	1	35
48	Ox Harley	1	34
48	Suicide Kid	4	34
50	Shane Mercer	1	28
51	Corporal Robinson	2	22
52	Calvin Tankman	1	21
52	M-Dogg 20	1	21
52	Tower of Doom	1	21
55	Billy Joe Eaton	1	18
56	Trik Davis	1	14
57	Hido	1	4
58	A.J. Styles	1	2
59	Buddy Landel	1	1
59	Eddie Guerrero	1	1

== See also ==
- Independent Wrestling Association Mid-South
- History of professional wrestling in the United States
