= Bellevue, Illinois =

Bellevue
- Village
- Location of Bellevue in Peoria County, Illinois.
- Coordinates: 40°41′16″N 89°40′23″W
- Country: United States
- State: Illinois
- County: Peoria
- Incorporated: March 2, 1941

Government
  - Mayor: Ross Pesch

Area
  - Total: 2.22 sq mi (5.76 km^{2})
  - Land: 2.22 sq mi (5.76 km^{2})
  - Water: 0 sq mi (0.00 km^{2})
- Elevation: 558 ft (170 m)

Population (2020)
  - Total: 1,878
  - Estimate (2024): 1,903
  - Density: 844.6/sq mi (326.11/km^{2})
- Time zone: UTC-6 (CST)
  - Summer (DST): UTC-5 (CDT)
- ZIP code: 61604
- Area code: 309
- FIPS code: 17-04871
- GNIS feature ID: 2398079
- Website: villageofbellevueil.com

Bellevue is a village in Peoria County, Illinois, United States. The population was 1,878 at the 2020 census. Bellevue is a suburb of Peoria and is part of the Peoria, Illinois Metropolitan Statistical Area.

== History ==
Bellevue was developed as a subdivision named Bellevue Acres from farmland in 1936 by the South Side Realty Company of Peoria. It was incorporated as a village on March 2, 1941.

== Geography ==
According to the 2010 census, Bellevue has a total area of 2.08 square miles (5.39 km^{2}), all land.

== Demographics ==
Historical population
Census	Pop.	Note	%±
1950	1,529		—
1960	1,561		2.1%
1970	1,189		−23.8%
1980	2,045		72.0%
1990	1,491		−27.1%
2000	1,887		26.6%
2010	1,978		4.8%
2020	1,878		−5.1%
U.S. Decennial Census

=== 2020 census ===
As of the 2020 census, Bellevue had a population of 1,878. The median age was 41.1 years. 22.4% of residents were under the age of 18 and 17.8% of residents were 65 years of age or older. For every 100 females there were 95.0 males, and for every 100 females age 18 and over there were 91.2 males age 18 and over.

100.0% of residents lived in urban areas, while 0.0% lived in rural areas.

There were 771 households in Bellevue, of which 27.5% had children under the age of 18 living in them. Of all households, 43.1% were married-couple households, 19.3% were households with a male householder and no spouse or partner present, and 28.7% were households with a female householder and no spouse or partner present. About 26.2% of all households were made up of individuals and 9.6% had someone living alone who was 65 years of age or older.

There were 881 housing units, of which 12.5% were vacant. The homeowner vacancy rate was 1.9% and the rental vacancy rate was 15.6%.

Racial composition as of the 2020 census
Race	Number	Percent
White	1,633	87.0%
Black or African American	83	4.4%
American Indian and Alaska Native	8	0.4%
Asian	6	0.3%
Native Hawaiian and Other Pacific Islander	0	0.0%
Some other race	18	1.0%
Two or more races	130	6.9%
Hispanic or Latino (of any race)	86	4.6%

=== 2000 census ===
As of the census of 2000, there were 1,887 people, 741 households, and 512 families residing in the village. The population density was 1,124.3 inhabitants per square mile (434.1/km^{2}). There were 872 housing units at an average density of 519.6 per square mile (200.6/km^{2}). The racial makeup of the village was 95.65% White, 1.01% African American, 0.26% Native American, 0.69% Asian, 0.05% Pacific Islander, 0.48% from other races, and 1.85% from two or more races. Hispanic or Latino of any race were 1.59% of the population.

There were 741 households, out of which 36.3% had children under the age of 18 living with them, 47.8% were married couples living together, 16.2% had a female householder with no husband present, and 30.9% were non-families. 25.9% of all households were made up of individuals, and 9.7% had someone living alone who was 65 years of age or older. The average household size was 2.55 and the average family size was 3.06.

In the village, the population was spread out, with 29.4% under the age of 18, 7.9% from 18 to 24, 31.2% from 25 to 44, 20.2% from 45 to 64, and 11.3% who were 65 years of age or older. The median age was 33 years. For every 100 females, there were 95.1 males. For every 100 females age 18 and over, there were 91.5 males.

The median income for a household in the village was $31,098, and the median income for a family was $35,972. Males had a median income of $31,875 versus $20,396 for females. The per capita income for the village was $14,228. About 9.0% of families and 10.9% of the population were below the poverty line, including 13.8% of those under age 18 and 6.9% of those age 65 or over.

== Transportation ==
CityLink provides bus service on Routes 7, 13 and 15 connecting Bellevue to downtown Peoria, Peoria International Airport and other destinations.

== Education ==
It is divided between various elementary school districts: Norwood Elementary School District 63, Pleasant Hill School District 69, Monroe School District 70, and Pleasant Valley School District 62. It is all in the same high school district: Limestone Community High School District 310.
