= Kongo Kong =

American professional wrestler (born 1979)

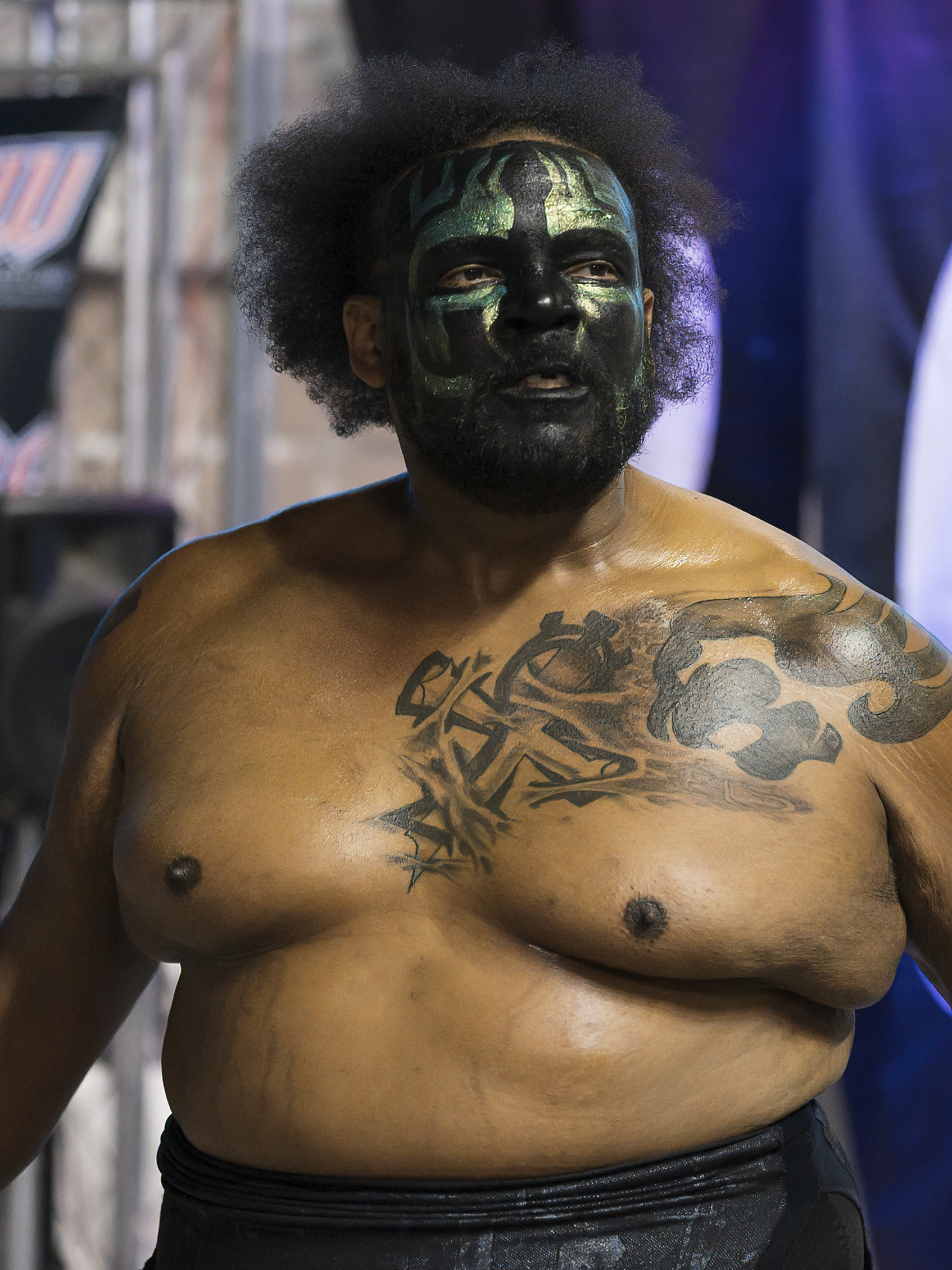
- Kong in September 2019

Personal information
- Born: Steven Wilson; August 10, 1979 (age 47) Grand Rapids, Michigan

Professional wrestling career
- Ring name(s): Kongo Kong; Osyris
- Billed height: 6 ft 7 in (201 cm)
- Billed weight: 376 lb (171 kg)
- Billed from: Hell, Michigan; Parts unknown Deepest, darkest jungle
- Trained by: Joe Ortega
- Debut: October 1998

Steven Wilson (born August 10, 1979) is an American professional wrestler best known under the ring name Kongo Kong. He is performing on the independent circuit – predominantly for Juggalo Championship Wrestling (JCW), where is a former one-time JCW Battle Royal Champion. He is best known for his time with IWA Mid-South, Global Force Wrestling (GFW) and Total Nonstop Action Wrestling (TNA).

== Early career ==
Wilson went to Saginaw Valley State University in Michigan, where he played football. While there, Wilson saw an advertisement for a wrestling school where he trained under Joe Ortega.

== Professional wrestling career ==
=== Independent circuit (1998–present) ===
Wilson made his professional wrestling debut in October 1998, where he competed under the ring name, Osyris, a character that Wilson modeled after Big Van Vader and Hulk Hogan. Wilson would go on to continue using this name through most of his independent run. In 2010, Wilson made his Juggalo Championship Wrestling debut now donning face-paint under the new name, Kongo Kong, a non-talking monster heel. The Kongo Kong gimmick was created by JCW co-founder, Violent J.

=== Global Force Wrestling (2015–2017) ===
Kong made his Global Force Wrestling (GFW) debut on June 13, 2015, as part of the GFW Grand Slam Tour, losing to Moose. On July 10, 2015, Kong faced Nick Aldis as part of the GFW Grand Slam Tour in Erie, Pennsylvania, making this their first of three matches during the tour which saw him losing on all three occasions. The following night, Kong defeated Aldis in a rematch. On July 24, 2015, Kong entered into a tournament to crown the inaugural GFW Global Champion, losing to Nick Aldis in the quarterfinals of the tournament. On October 23, 2015, Kongo defeated Brian Myers and Kevin Kross in a three-way number-one contenders match for the GFW Global Championship. On July 1, 2016, during a GFW Live event in Marion, Illinois, Kong defeated Danny Duggan, Joey Avalon, and Mike Outlaw in a four-way match.

=== Impact Wrestling (2017–2019) ===
On the April 13, 2017 edition of Impact Wrestling, he debuted attacking Braxton Sutter as Sienna's surprise. The following week, on April 20, Kong made his in-ring debut, defeating Chris Silvio. On April 27, he defeated Matt Sigmon. On the May 25, 2017, episode of Impact Wrestling Kong teamed with KM defeating Braxton Sutter and Mahabali Shera after both teams began a feud with each other. On the June 15, 2017, episode of Impact Wrestling that occurred in Mumbai, India, Kong competed in a Gauntlet match for the inaugural Sony SIX Invitational Trophy, which was won by Mahabali Shera. On July 2, 2017, during the Pre Show of Slammiversary XV, Kong teamed with KM and Laurel Van Ness losing to Mahabali Shera, Braxton Sutter, and Allie in a Six-person tag team match. On the August 24 episode of TNA Impact!, Kong Competed in a 20-man gauntlet match, for a shot to win the vacant Impact World Championship, which was won by Eli Drake. In 2018, Kong feuded with Brian Cage. On June 7, 2019, it was reported that Kong had parted ways with Impact Wrestling since the promotion didn't have plans for him.

== Personal life ==
In March 2019, Wilson started and now runs his own Pro Wrestling School in Bluffton, Indiana called Prof. Kongo Kong's Pro Wrestling Academy with Mark Vanderkolk also known as Mark Vandy.

In February 2026, Wilson stated that half of his right foot was removed due to a talus injury.

== Championships and accomplishments ==
- American Pro Wrestling Alliance
  - APWA Global Championship (2 times)
- Border City Wrestling
  - BCW Can-Am Heavyweight Championship (1 time)
- Battle On The Border
  - BOTB Hardcore Championship (1 time, current)
  - BOTB Heavyweight Championship (1 time)
  - BOTB Tag Team Championship (1 time) – with Madman Fulton
- Border Town Pro Wrestling
  - BTPW Championship (1 time, final)
- Crossfire Wrestling
  - CW Heavyweight Championship (1 time)
  - CW Tag Team Championship (1 time) – with Bin Hamin
- Elite Pro Wrestling
  - Elite Pro Heavyweight Championship (1 time)
- Extreme Wrestling Federation
  - EWF Heavyweight Championship (2 times)
  - EWF Midwestern Championship (1 time)
  - EWF Tag Team Championship (1 time) – with Hurricane
- Heroes And Legends Wrestling
  - HLW Heavyweight Championship (1 time)
- Independent Wrestling Association Mid-South
  - IWA Mid-South Heavyweight Championship (3 times)
  - Ted Petty Invitational (2015)
- Insanity Pro Wrestling
  - IPW World Championship (1 time)
- International Bigtime Wrestling
  - IBW Heavyweight Championship (1 time)
- Juggalo Championship Wrestling
  - JCW Heavyweight Championship (1 time)
  - JCW Battle Royal Championship (1 time)
- Lakeshore Wrestling Organization
  - LsWO Heavyweight Championship (1 time)
- Lethal Lucha Wrestling
  - Lethal Lucha Championship (1 time, current)
- Mid-Ohio Wrestling
  - Mid-Ohio Heavyweight Championship (1 time)
- Price of Glory Wrestling
  - POGW Tag Team Championship (1 time) – with Idol Heinze
- Pure Pro Wrestling
  - AIWF/PPW Michigan State Heavyweight Championship (1 time)
- Pro Wrestling All-Stars Of Detroit
  - PWASD Heavyweight Championship (1 time)
- Pro Wrestling Illustrated
  - Ranked No. 134 of the top 500 singles wrestlers in the PWI 500 in 2018
- Pro Wrestling Zero1
  - ZERO1 USA Northern States Championship (1 time)
- Resolute Wrestling
  - RWW Twitch Championship (1 time)
- SOAR Championship Wrestling
  - SOAR Championship (1 time)
- Strong Style Wrestling
  - SSW Heavyweight Championship (1 time)
- Xtreme Intense Championship Wrestling
  - XICW Proving Grounds Championship (1 time, inaugural)
  - XICW United States Championship (1 time)
  - XICW Xtreme Intense Championship (1 time)
