= Fairness =

Fairness or being fair can refer to:

- Justice; in particular:
  - Objectivity (philosophy), independence from any person's mind
  - Impartiality, property of decisions based on objective criteria
  - Procedural justice, rules or procedures used to allocate goods, benefits, and other outcomes fairly
  - Interactional justice, fair treatment of persons in social situations
- Fairness, a character in the musical comedy A Theory of Justice: The Musical
- Fairness measure, metrics to quantify the fair distribution of resources
- Fairness doctrine, principle for equitable presentation of controversies in American broadcasting
- Fairness, a property of unbounded nondeterminism in algorithms
- Fairness (machine learning), a desirable property of machine learning algorithms
- Fair division in game theory
- Fair value in economics
- Fairness of human skin tone
- Physical attractiveness, the original meaning of the word
- Fair ball in baseball
- Sportsmanship
