= IWA Mid-South Light Heavyweight Championship =

Professional wrestling championship

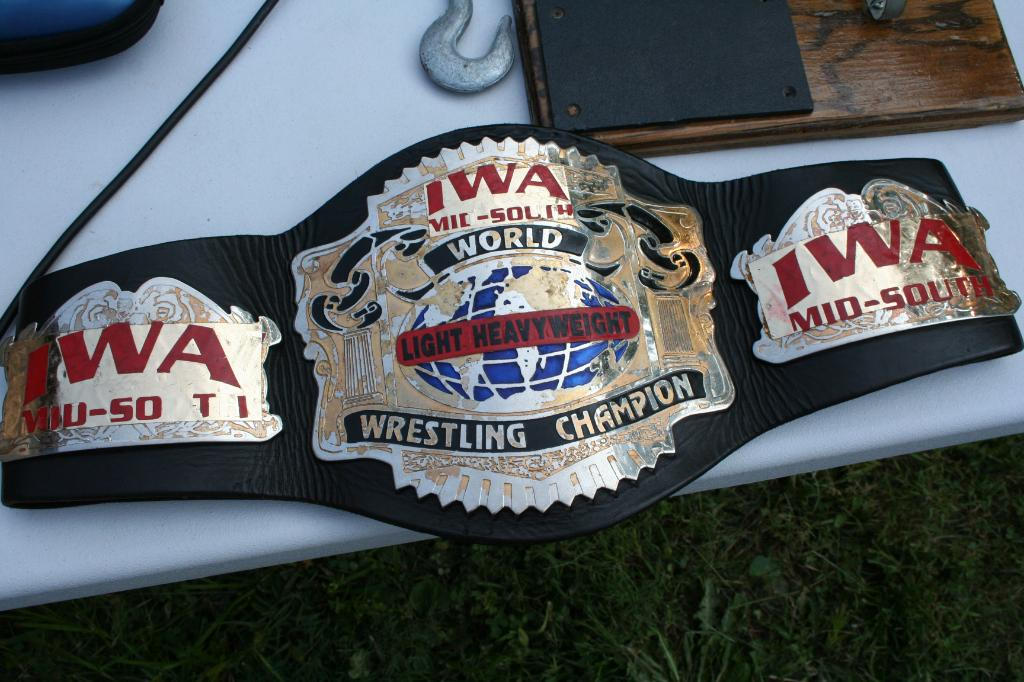
- The championship belt

Details
- Promotion: Independent Wrestling Association Mid-South
- Date established: January 6, 1996
- Date retired: 2013

Other names
- IWA Mid-South Lightweight Championship (January 06, 1996 - June 14, 1996); IWA Mid-South Light Heavyweight Championship (June 14, 1996 - present)
Statistics
- First champion: American Kickboxer
- Final champion: Devon Moore
- Most reigns: Tarek the Great (11 times)
- Longest reign: Josh Abercrombie (448 days)
- Shortest reign: American Kickboxer, Tarek the Great, Wild Child, Tyrin, Suicide Kid, J Prodigy (BDL), Mike Sensation, Hy-Zya, Richard X, Jason Hades, Dingo (<1 days)

The IWA Mid-South Light Heavyweight Championship is one of the major titles in the Independent Wrestling Association Mid-South. The title debuted as the Lightweight Title in 1996, evolving to the current weight class in 1998.

== Title history ==
Wrestler:	Times:	Date:	Length:	Place:	Notes:
American Kickboxer	1	January 6, 1996	284	New Albany, Indiana	Defeated El Perro to become the first Lightweight champion.
El Perro (Tarek The Great)	1	October 17, 1996	14	Louisville, Kentucky	
American Kickboxer	2	October 31, 1996	<1-28	Louisville, Kentucky	Won a mask vs. mask match against Perro, who unmasked as Tarek the Great.
Tarek the Great	2	1996	<1-28	Louisville, Kentucky	
Wild Child	1	November 28, 1996	7	Louisville, Kentucky	
Tarek the Great	3	December 5, 1996	<1-77	Louisville, Kentucky	
American Kickboxer	3	Date Unknown	<1-77	Louisville, Kentucky	
Tarek the Great	4	February 20, 1997	7	Louisville, Kentucky	
American Kickboxer	4	February 27, 1997	6	Louisville, Kentucky	
Tarek the Great	5	March 5, 1997	1	Campbellsville, Kentucky	
American Kickboxer	5	March 6, 1997	6	Louisville, Kentucky	
Tarek the Great	6	March 12, 1997	1	Louisville, Kentucky	
American Kickboxer	6	March 13, 1997	14	Louisville, Kentucky	Stripped on March 27, 1997.
Danny Dee	1	March 27, 1997	13	Louisville, Kentucky	Defeated Tarek the Great; stripped on April 10, 1997.
Wild Child	2	April 10, 1997	<1	Louisville, Kentucky	Wins a 4-way match.
Bull Pain	1	April 10, 1997	35	Louisville, Kentucky	Stripped on May 15, 1997, when Pain exceeded the weight limit.
American Kickboxer	7	May 15, 1997	21	Louisville, Kentucky	Defeated J. C. Ice.
Tarek the Great	7	June 5, 1997	7	Louisville, Kentucky	
Tyrin	1	June 12, 1997	14	Louisville, Kentucky	
J. C. Ice	1	June 26, 1997	7	Louisville, Kentucky	
Tyrin	2	July 3, 1997	16	Louisville, Kentucky	
American Kickboxer	8	July 19, 1997	13	Louisville, Kentucky	
Tarek the Great	8	August 1, 1997	34	Louisville, Kentucky	Stripped on September 4, 1997.
Reckless Youth	1	September 4, 1997	65	Louisville, Kentucky	Defeated The American Kickboxer; stripped on November 8, 1997.
American Kickboxer	9	November 8, 1997	19	Lexington, Kentucky	Won a 3-way match.
Twiggy Ramirez	1	November 27, 1997	119	Louisville, Kentucky	Stripped on March 26, 1998.
Tarek the Great	9	March 26, 1998	7	Louisville, Kentucky	Defeated The American Kickboxer and The Suicide Kid in a 3-way match; stripped on April 2, 1998.
The Suicide Kid	1	April 2, 1998	1	Louisville, Kentucky	Defeated The American Kickboxer.
Tarek the Great	10	April 3, 1998	27	Scottsburg, Indiana	
Tyrin	3	April 30, 1998	<1	Louisville, Kentucky	
Harry Palmer	1	April 30, 1998	42	Louisville, Kentucky	
Mike Sensation	1	June 11, 1998	14	Louisville, Kentucky	
Became "Light Heavyweight Championship."
Cash Flo	1	June 25, 1998	35	Louisville, Kentucky	
Adam Pearce	1	July 30, 1998	161	Louisville, Kentucky	Stripped on January 7, 1999, due to non-defense.
BDL	1	January 7, 1999	26	Louisville, Kentucky	Defeated Twiggy Ramirez and The Suicide Kid in a 3-way match.
Harry Palmer	1	February 2, 1999	85	Louisville, Kentucky	
Suicide Kid	2	April 29, 1999	<1-281	Salem, Indiana	
J Prodigy (BDL)	2	Date Unknown	<1-281	Louisville, Kentucky	
Harry Palmer	3	February 4, 2000	12	Charlestown, Indiana	
Held up on February 16, 2000; no champion was crowned in a rematch on February 23, 2000.
Mike Sensation	2	March 4, 2000	<1	Charlestown, Indiana	Awarded.
Hy-Zya	1	March 4, 2000	<1	Charlestown, Indiana	
American Kickboxer	10	March 4, 2000	28	Charlestown, Indiana	
Hy-Zya	2	April 1, 2000	<1-21	Charlestown, Indiana	
Vacant.
Suicide Kid	3	April 22, 2000	84	Charlestown, Indiana	Defeated Prophet Daniel Quinn in a 3-man tournament final.
Paul E. Smooth	1	July 15, 2000	21	Charlestown, Indiana	
Prophet Daniel Quinn	1	August 5, 2000	25	Charlestown, Indiana	
Hy-Zya	3	August 30, 2000	24	Charlestown, Indiana	
Richard X	1	September 23, 2000	7	Charlestown, Indiana	
Hy-Zya	4	September 30, 2000	13	Charlestown, Indiana	
Richard X	2	October 13, 2000	<1-60	Charlestown, Indiana	
Vacant.
Hy-Zya	5	December 16, 2000	4	Charlestown, Indiana	Defeated Todd Morton.
Mark Wolf	1	December 20, 2000	9	Charlestown, Indiana	
Paul E. Smooth	2	December 29, 2000	1	Charlestown, Indiana	
Mark Wolf	2	December 30, 2000	11	Charlestown, Indiana	
Paul E. Smooth	3	January 10, 2001	87	Charlestown, Indiana	
Hy-Zya	6	April 7, 2001	29	Charlestown, Indiana	
Mark Wolf	3	May 6, 2001	34	Charlestown, Indiana	Defeated Hy-Zaya and Richard X in a 3-way match.
CM Punk	1	June 9, 2001	35	Charlestown, Indiana	
Tarek the Great	11	July 14, 2001	77	Charlestown, Indiana	
Mark Wolf	4	September 29, 2001	7	Charlestown, Indiana	Defeated Tarek and Hy-Zya in a 3-way match.
Tarek the Great	12	October 6, 2001	28	Charlestown, Indiana	
CM Punk	2	November 3, 2001	59	Charlestown, Indiana	Stripped for no-defense.
Kurt Krueger	1	February 1, 2002	7	Charlestown, Indiana	Defeated Cuefa in tournament final.
Ace Steel	1	February 8, 2002	28	Indianapolis, Indiana	
Vic Capri	1	March 8, 2002	57	Charlestown, Indiana	
Ace Steel	2	May 3, 2002	30-60	Clarksville, Indiana	Stripped in June 2002 for not defending it within 30 days.
Vacant.
Kurt Krueger	2	August 3, 2002	63	Clarksville, Indiana	Defeated Tarek the Great in an 8-man tournament final.
Nate Webb	1	October 5, 2002	42	Clarksville, Indiana	
Danny Daniels	1	November 16, 2002	42	Clarksville, Indiana	
Shark Boy	1	December 28, 2002	73	Clarksville, Indiana	
Nate Webb	2	March 11, 2003	18	Clarksville, Indiana	
J. C. Bailey	1	March 29, 2003	55	Clarksville, Indiana	
Michael Todd Stratton (Todd Morton)	1	May 24, 2003	7	Clarksville, Indiana	
J. C. Bailey	2	May 31, 2003	70	Clarksville, Indiana	
Sonjay Dutt	1	August 9, 2003	104	Philadelphia, Pennsylvania	
J. C. Bailey	3	November 21, 2003	57	Highland, Indiana	Defeated Sonjay Dutt and Nate Webb in 3-way match.
Matt Sydal	1	January 17, 2004	160	Highland, Indiana	
Delirious	1	June 26, 2004	56	Oolitic, Indiana	
Held up on August 21, 2004 in Highland, Indiana when a match against Jimmy Jacobs ended with a double pin.
Jimmy Jacobs	1	September 17, 2004	86	Highland, Indiana	Defeated Delirious in a ladder match
Delirious	2	December 12, 2004	180	Highland, Indiana	
Josh Abercrombie	1	June 11, 2005	126	Philadelphia, Pennsylvania	
Tyler Black	1	October 15, 2005	98	Midlothian, Illinois	Defeated Abercrombie in a best of 7 series.
Josh Abercrombie	2	January 21, 2006	447	Midlothian, Illinois	
Brandon Thomaselli	1	April 14, 2007	139	Shelbyville, Indiana	
Chuck Taylor	1	August 31, 2007	1	Midlothian, Illinois	
Mike Quackenbush	1	September 1, 2007	97	Pelham, Alabama	
Chuck Taylor	2	December 7, 2007	126	Plainfield, Illinois	Defeated Quackenbush in a match also involving Chris Hero and Eddie Kingston.
Jason Hades	1	April 12, 2008	<1-280	Joliet, Illinois	
Dingo	1	n\a	<1-280	Joliet, Illinois	
Quick Carter Gray	1	January 17, 2009	49	Joliet, Illinois	
Jimmy Jacobs	2	March 7, 2009	89	Joliet, Illinois	
Jason Hades	2	June 5, 2009	259	Joliet, Illinois	
Ryan Phoenix	1	February 19, 2010	126	Bellevue, Illinois	
Jaysin Strife	1	June 26, 2010	275	Bellevue, Illinois	This was a No DQ match. Matt Cage, Hunter Matthews and Markus Crane beat down Phoenix en route to Strife gaining the victory.
Title retired on March 28, 2011, when IWA Mid-South ceases its operations.
BJ Whitmer	1	September 16, 2011	28	Bellevue, Illinois	Defeated Bucky Collins for the vacant title when Jaysin Strife could not appear to defend it when IWA-MS reopened under new ownership.
Bucky Collins	1	October 14, 2011	140	Bellevue, Illinois	
Oliver Cain	1	March 2, 2012	105	Bellevue, Illinois	Triple threat with Bucky Collins and CZW World Champ Scotty Vortex, whose title was also on the line where the belt changed hands if the title-holder was pinned.
Bucky Collins	2	June 16, 2012	77	Bellevue, Illinois	2/3 Fall Match won 2–1 over Cain
Devon Moore	1	September 1, 2012	–	Bellevue, Illinois	Won in a Chicago Street Fight
Retired in 2013
