= Logan James =

American wrestler (born 1998)

Personal information
- Born: February 26, 1998 (age 28) Hillview, Kentucky, U.S.

Professional wrestling career
- Ring name(s): L.J. Logan James
- Trained by: Matt Cappotelli; Rip Rogers
- Debut: 2016

Logan James is an American professional wrestler, He is best known for his work in the independent circuit.

He is also known for his time in IWA Mid-South, where he is former IWA Mid-South Junior Heavyweight Champion, IWA Mid-South Heavyweight Champion and IWA Mid-South Tag Team Champion with fellow stable members Tyler Matrix and Adam Slade.

== Professional wrestling career ==
=== Independent circuit (2016–2023) ===
Logan James debuted as a professional wrestler in Ohio Valley Wrestling's Saturday Night Special Christmas Chaos on December 3, 2016, under the name L.J. where he teamed up with Callie and Carlos Gabriel in a losing effort to Adam Slade, Robbie Walker and Madi Maxx in a six-person intergender tag team match. He is known for his tenure with Ohio Valley Wrestling where he is a former OVW Television Champion for which he feuded with Randall Floyd. James was previous competes for IWA Mid-South, where he is a former IWA Mid-South Junior Heavyweight Champion, IWA Mid-South Heavyweight Champion and IWA Mid-South Tag Team Champion with fellow stable members Tyler Matrix and Adam Slade. On September 22, 2018, he took part of the IWA Ted Petty Invitational Tournament defending his junior heavyweight title against Pat Monix. He lost the first round match as well as the championship. He worked with wrestling personalities such as Brian Pillman Jr., Davey Boy Smith Jr. and Fred Yehi. At the 2018 IWA Somebody's Gonns Hurt Somebody on June 15, James lost a match against Impact Wrestling star Trey Miguel. Along with Tyler Matrix, James defended their IWA Mid-South Tag Team Championship successfully against The Mason Dixon Line (Devan Dixon and Silas Mason) at IWA Mid-South In Like A Lion 2021 from March 13.

== Championships and accomplishments ==
- New South Pro Wrestling
  - New South Tag Team Championship (1 time) – with Tyler Matrix
- IWA Mid-South
  - IWA Mid-South Heavyweight Championship(1 time)
  - IWA Mid-South Junior Heavyweight Championship (5 times, inaugural)
  - IWA Mid-South Tag Team Championship (3 times) - with Tyler Matrix and Adam Slade
  - IWA Mid-South Junior Heavyweight Title Tournament (2018)
- Ohio Valley Wrestling
  - OVW Television Championship (3 times)
- Optimum Pro Wrestling Kentuckiana
  - OPW Championship (1 time)
  - Leon Noel Memorial Tournament (2019)
