= Fight Club: The Art of War Games (2025) =

2025 Game Changer Wrestling livestreaming event

- Promotional poster featuring Matt Tremont, Effy Drew Parker, Bam Sullivan, Mr. Danger, Mad Man Pondo, 2 Tuff Tony, CoKane, Shane Mercer, Willie Mack and Violent J
- Promotion: Game Changer Wrestling
- Date: October 11, 2025
- City: Atlantic City, New Jersey
- Venue: Showboat Resort Atlantic City

Pay-per-view chronology
← Previous; The Last Frontier	Next → Fight Club; Night 2

Fight Club chronology
← Previous; 2024	Next → 2026

GCW Fight Club: Night 1 – The Art of War Games was a professional wrestling pay-per-view event produced by Game Changer Wrestling. The event took place on October 11, 2025 at Showboat Resort Atlantic City in Atlantic City, New Jersey and was streamed live on Triller TV. The event also featured wrestlers from Juggalo Championship Wrestling (JCW).

== Production ==
=== Background ===
On September 14, 2024, at Game Changer Wrestling's Bad One pay-per-view in Detroit, Violent J of Insane Clown Posse made an appearance during a six-man tag team consisting of 2 Tuff Tony, Breyer Wellington, and Mad Man Pondo, who Violent J had accompanied, against Thrunt (1 Called Manders, Dark Sheik, and Effy) in a six man tag team match. Despite losing the match, Violent J issued a challenge to GCW to a "2 day war" at the Gathering of the Juggalos the following year. On November 15, 2024, Mance Warner defended the GCW World Championship against 2 Tuff Tony during the Chaos in Kentucky pay-per-view in Louisville, Kentucky. After several exhibition matches between the two sides, Violent J would accompany 2 Tuff Tony and the Backseat Boyz (Tommy Grayson and JP Grayson) to The People vs. GCW kickoff show at the Hammerstein Ballroom in New York City on January 21, 2025 in a pre-show rumble. 2 Tuff Tony would be the fourth wrestler to be eliminated on the rumble by former JCW Heavyweight Champion, Shane Mercer.

A JCW exhibition six wrestler tag team match between the Backseat Boyz (Tommy Grayson and JP Grayson) and The Wraith against Dani Mo and the Brothers of Funstruction (Yabo The Clown and Ruffo The Clown) took place on GCW's Amerikaz Most Wanted pay-per-view on March 30, 2025 in Sauget, Illinois which featured Violent J on commentary along with JCW's ring announcer, The Ringmaster. Violent J would also accompany 2 Tuff Tony and Mickie Knuckles who would fight against The Rejects (John Wayne Murdoch and Reed Bentley) in the main event of the show. After Amerikaz Most Wanted had ended, a riot had broken out on stage during a Violent J post-show concert where the GCW and JCW wrestlers brawled on stage during the concert and backstage.

On April 20, 2025, during the Joey Janela's Spring Break: Clusterf**k Forever pay-per-view, Mickie Knuckles, 2 Tuff Tony, the Brothers of Funstruction (Yabo The Clown and Ruffo The Clown), the Backseat Boyz (Tommy Grayson and JP Grayson), and Dani Mo entered into the Clusterf**k Battle Royal representing JCW in which they had taken control of the ring for a brief period before Matt Tremont, Bam Sullivan, Big Joe, Lou Nixon, Dr. Redacted, and John Wayne Murdoch entered as Team GCW and would brawl backstage during the match.

On the May 1, 2025 episode of JCW Lunacy, Effy would make his debut in JCW. Several more GCW wrestlers would make appearances on various Lunacy episodes in which Joey Janela, Matt Tremont, Jimmy Lloyd, and Sonny Kiss would regularly be featured in various matches representing GCW in the build up to the 2 Day War.

During GCW's Cage of Survival 4 pay-per-view on June 8, 2025 at Showboat Atlantic City in Atlantic City, New Jersey, an eight man tag team match would take place between Team JCW (2 Tuff Tony, Mickie Knuckles, Ruffo The Clown, and Yabo The Clown) against Team GCW (Effy, Jimmy Lloyd, John Wayne Murdoch, and Matt Tremont). However, the match would be thrown out and escalate into a riot which made its way outside the Showboat.

On July 4, 2025 during GCW's Backyard Wrestling 7, Tommy Grayson of the Backseat Boyz suffered an ankle injury during a match against YDNP (Alec Price and Jordan Oliver), forcing him to be sidelined from wrestling in the months leading up to the Gathering. He would be replaced on the card for JCW's Powder Keg pay-per-view with Shane Mercer and Matt Cross on the 2 Day War.

On July 17, 2025, JCW and GCW held a pay-per-view event titled GCW x JCW Showcase Showdown: The Violence is Right in which the main event would be Mad Man Pondo defending the JCW Heavyweight Championship against Matt Tremont in a death match. During the match, GCW owner Brett Lauderdale would intervene and result in Tremont winning the title for the first time.

On August 2, 2025 during JCW's Powder Keg pay-per-view in Rutherford, New Jersey, John Wayne Murdoch was set on fire during a match in which he teamed with 1 Called Manders and Matt Tremont against the team of JCW Hall of Famers represented by 2 Tuff Tony, Mad Man Pondo, and Mickie Knuckles. At the end of the match, Murdoch would be set on fire after being suplexed through a burning table by Pondo. The match would be declared a no contest as a result. The stunt had forced him to be rushed to the hospital after the show. On the following live episode of JCW Lunacy on August 12, 2025 at the Gathering of the Juggalos, Violent J would announce that Mickie Knuckles and Mad Man Pondo would be suspended after the stunt and that Pondo would be pulled from his rematch with Matt Tremont for the JCW Heavyweight Championship. He was replaced by 2 Tuff Tony who defeated Tremont to win the JCW Heavyweight Championship for the sixth time in a barbed wire death match.

During the first night of GCW's Homecoming pay-per-view on August 23, 2025, Violent J, Caleb Konley, and 2 Tuff Tony invaded the ring during an in-ring promo by GCW owner Brett Lauderdale who challenged Violent J to a WarGames match at Fight Club.

Following their victory over the Brothers of Funstruction (Yabo The Clown and Ruffo The Clown) for the JCW Tag Team Championship during the 2 Day War, YDNP (Jordan Oliver and Alec Price defended the title in a Riddlebox match against the duo during the promotion's Evil Deeds pay-per-view at the Harpos Concert Theatre in Detroit in which they put the GCW World Tag Team Championship on the line as well. However, YDNP lost both of the belts to the Brothers of Funstruction.

=== Storylines ===
Fight Club: The Art of War Games featured professional wrestling matches that involves different wrestlers from pre-existing scripted feuds and storylines. Wrestlers portrayed villains, heroes, or less distinguishable characters in scripted events that built tension and culminated in a wrestling match or series of matches. Storylines were produced on Juggalo Championship Wrestling's various events and on their weekly internet show JCW Lunacy and on various Game Changer Wrestling pay-per-view events.

== Results ==
No.	Results	Stipulations	Times
1	Terry Yaki defeated Tony Deppen by pinfall	Singles match	11:44
2	KJ Orso defeated Man Like DeReiss by pinfall	Singles match	10:29
3	Joey Janela defeated Austin Luke, Logan Cavazos, Lucky 13, Ryan Clancy, and Will Kroos	Six-way scramble match	11:03
4	1 Called Manders defeated Beastman by pinfall	Hardcore match	7:40
5	Otis Cogar defeated Emersyn Jayne by pinfall	Nick Gage Invitational 10 qualifier death match	11:39
6	Team GCW (Bam Sullivan, Drew Parker, Effy, Matt Tremont, and Mr. Danger) defeated Team JCW (2 Tuff Tony, Cocaine, Mad Man Pondo, Shane Mercer, and Willie Mack) (with Violent J)	WarGames match	29:32
