= Cage of Survival 4 =

2025 Game Changer Wrestling pay-per-view event

- Promotion: Game Changer Wrestling
- Date: June 8, 2025
- City: Atlantic City, New Jersey
- Venue: Showboat Resort Atlantic City

Game Changer Wrestling pay-per-view event chronology
← Previous; Tournament of Survival X	Next → Bangin' In Little Rock

Cage of Survival 4 was a professional wrestling pay-per-view event produced by Game Changer Wrestling. The event took place on June 8, 2025 at Showboat Resort Atlantic City in Atlantic City, New Jersey and was streamed live on Triller TV. The event also featured wrestlers from Juggalo Championship Wrestling (JCW).

== Production ==
=== Background ===
On September 14, 2024, at Game Changer Wrestling's Bad One pay-per-view in Detroit, Violent J of Insane Clown Posse made an appearance during a six-man tag team consisting of 2 Tuff Tony, Breyer Wellington, and Mad Man Pondo, who Violent J had accompanied, against Thrunt (1 Called Manders, Dark Sheik, and Effy) in a six man tag team match. Despite losing the match, Violent J issued a challenge to GCW to a "2 day war" at the Gathering of the Juggalos the following year. On November 15, 2024, Mance Warner defended the GCW World Championship against 2 Tuff Tony during the Chaos in Kentucky pay-per-view in Louisville, Kentucky. After several exhibition matches between the two sides, Violent J would accompany 2 Tuff Tony and the Backseat Boyz (Tommy Grayson and JP Grayson) to The People vs. GCW kickoff show at the Hammerstein Ballroom in New York City on January 21, 2025 in a pre-show rumble. 2 Tuff Tony would be the fourth wrestler to be eliminated on the rumble by former JCW Heavyweight Champion, Shane Mercer.

A JCW exhibition six wrestler tag team match between the Backseat Boyz (Tommy Grayson and JP Grayson) and The Wraith against Dani Mo and the Brothers of Funstruction (Yabo The Clown and Ruffo The Clown) took place on GCW's Amerikaz Most Wanted pay-per-view on March 30, 2025 in Sauget, Illinois which featured Violent J on commentary along with JCW's ring announcer, The Ringmaster. Violent J would also accompany 2 Tuff Tony and Mickie Knuckles who would fight against The Rejects (John Wayne Murdoch and Reed Bentley) in the main event of the show. After Amerikaz Most Wanted had ended, a riot had broken out on stage during a Violent J post-show concert where the GCW and JCW wrestlers brawled on stage during the concert and backstage.

On April 20, 2025, during the Joey Janela's Spring Break: Clusterf**k Forever pay-per-view, Mickie Knuckles, 2 Tuff Tony, the Brothers of Funstruction (Yabo The Clown and Ruffo The Clown), the Backseat Boyz (Tommy Grayson and JP Grayson), and Dani Mo entered into the Clusterf**k Battle Royal representing JCW in which they had taken control of the ring for a brief period before Matt Tremont, Bam Sullivan, Big Joe, Lou Nixon, Dr. Redacted, and John Wayne Murdoch entered as Team GCW and would brawl backstage during the match.

On the May 1, 2025 episode of JCW Lunacy, Effy made his debut in JCW. Several more GCW wrestlers made appearances on various Lunacy episodes in which Joey Janela, Matt Tremont, Jimmy Lloyd, and Sonny Kiss would regularly be featured in various matches representing GCW in the build up to the 2 Day War.

== Results ==
No.	Results	Stipulations	Times
1	Slade defeated Bear Bronson by pinfall	Singles match	14:41
2	Charles Mason defeated Jamie Lynn Senegal by pinfall	Singles match	4:22
3	YDNP (Alec Price, Charlie Tiger, and Jordan Oliver) defeated Jay Lucas, Jeffrey John, and Terry Yaki by pinfall	Six-man tag team match	6:14
4	Masha Slamovich (c) defeated KJ Orso by pinfall	Singles match for the JCW World Championship	13:03
5	Daiju Wakamatsu and Dr. Redacted defeated Lil Sicko and Mr. Dange by pinfall	Tag team match	13:01
6	Atticus Cogar (with Christian Napier and Otis Cogar) defeated Joey Janela by pinfall	Dog collar match	22:43
7	Team GCW (Effy, Jimmy Lloyd, John Wayne Murdoch, and Matt Tremont) (with 1 Called Manders, Alec Price, Dr. Redacted, Jordan Oliver, and Masha Slamovich) vs. Team JCW (2 Tuff Tony, Mickie Knuckles, Ruffo The Clown and Yabo The Clown) (with Alice Crowley, Dani Mo, JP Grayson, Shane Mercer, Tommy Grayson, Violent J, and Willie Mack) ended in a no contest	Eight-man tag team match	24:37
8	Miedo Extremo defeated Ciclope by pinfall	Cage of Survival match	18:38
(c) / – the champion(s) heading into the match
