= GCW x JCW Showcase Showdown: The Violence is Right =

2025 Juggalo Championship Wrestling and Game Changer Wrestling event

- Promotional poster featuring Mad Man Pondo and Matt Tremont
- Promotion(s): Juggalo Championship Wrestling; Game Changer Wrestling
- Date: July 17, 2025
- City: Detroit, Michigan
- Venue: Majestic Theatre

Event chronology
← Previous; JCW: JCW vs. Imperial Pro Wrestling Invasion; GCW: Boss of all Bosses	Next → JCW: Powder Keg; GCW: Bash at the Ballpark

GCW x JCW Showcase Showdown: The Violence is Right was a professional wrestling pay-per-view (PPV) and livestreaming event co-produced by Juggalo Championship Wrestling and Game Changer Wrestling. The show took place on July 17, 2025 at the Majestic Theatre in Detroit, Michigan and was aired live on Triller TV, YouTube, and Twitch.

== Production ==
Other on-screen personnel
Role:	Name:
Disc Jockey	DJ Clay
Commentators	Joe Dombrowski
Commentators	Mark Roberts
Commentators	Zac Amico
Commentators	Brett Lauderdale
Commentators	Alec Price
Commentators	Jordan Oliver
Ring announcers	Johnny Delicious
Ring announcers	The Ringmaster

=== Background ===
On September 14, 2024, at Game Changer Wrestling's Bad One pay-per-view in Detroit, Violent J of Insane Clown Posse would accompany a six-man tag team consisting of 2 Tuff Tony, Breyer Wellington, and Mad Man Pondo against Thrunt (1 Called Manders, Dark Sheik, and Effy) in a six man tag team match. Despite losing the match, Violent J would issue a challenge to GCW to a "2 day war" at the Gathering of the Juggalos the following year. After a series exhibition matches between the two sides, Violent J would accompany 2 Tuff Tony, and the Backseat Boyz (Tommy Grayson and JP Grayson) to The People vs. GCW kickoff show at the Hammerstein Ballroom in New York City on January 21, 2025 in a pre-show rumble. 2 Tuff Tony would be the fourth wrestler to be eliminated on the rumble by former JCW Heavyweight Champion, Shane Mercer.

A JCW exhibition six man tag team match between the Backseat Boyz (Tommy Grayson and JP Grayson) and The Wraith against Dani Mo and the Brothers of Funstruction (Yabo The Clown and Ruffo The Clown) took place at GCW's Amerikaz Most Wanted pay-per-view on March 30, 2025 in Sauget, Illinois which featured Violent J on commentary along with JCW's ring announcer, The Ringmaster. Violent J would also accompany 2 Tuff Tony and Mickie Knuckles who fought against The Rejects (John Wayne Murdoch and Reed Bentley) in the main event of the show.

On April 20, 2025, during Joey Janela's Spring Break: Clusterf**k Forever pay-per-view, Mickie Knuckles, 2 Tuff Tony, the Brothers of Funstruction (Yabo The Clown and Ruffo The Clown), |The Backseat Boyz
(JP Grayson and Tommy Grayson, and Dani Mo entered into the Clusterf**k Battle Royal representing JCW in which they had taken control of the ring for a brief period before Matt Tremont, Bam Sullivan, Big Joe, Lou Nixon, Dr. Redacted, and John Wayne Murdoch would enter as Team GCW and would brawl backstage during the match.

On the May 1, 2025 episode of JCW Lunacy, Effy would make his debut in JCW. Several more GCW wrestlers would make appearances on various Lunacy episodes in which Joey Janela, Matt Tremont, Jimmy Lloyd, and Sonny Kiss would regularly be featured in various matches representing GCW in the build up to the 2 Day War. On the July 14, 2025 episode of JCW Lunacy, Mad Man Pondo would make his return to JCW after he had been absent from the promotion since Bloodymania 17. He would team up with Mickie Knuckles and Willie Mack in a Team JCW vs. Team GCW six man tag team match in which Team JCW would end up getting the victory. On the July 17, 2025 episode of JCW Lunacy, which would lead directly into the Showcase Showdown, Mad Man Pondo would win the JCW Heavyweight Championship by defeating Kerry Morton. He would defend the title at the Showcase Showdown against Matt Tremont.

=== Storylines ===
GCW x JCW Showcase Showdown: The Violence is Right featured nine professional wrestling matches, with different wrestlers involved in pre-existing scripted feuds, plots and storylines. Wrestlers portrayed either heels or faces as they engaged in a series of tension-building events, which culminated in a wrestling match. Storylines were produced on Juggalo Championship Wrestling's various events and on their weekly internet show JCW Lunacy and on various Game Changer Wrestling pay-per-view events.

== Results ==
No.	Results	Stipulations	Times
1	Effy and Joey Janela defeated VNDL48 (Christian Napier and Otis Cogar) by pinfall	Tag team match	9:53
2	Alice Crowley (c) defeated Christina Marie, Haley J, and Rachel Armstrong by pinfall	Four way match for the JCW Women's Championship	4:16
3	Atticus Cogar defeated Man Like DeReiss by pinfall	Singles match	9:11
4	Caleb Konley (with Jeeves) (c) defeated Cocaine by pinfall	Singles match for the JCW American Championship	12:03
5	YDNP (Jordan Oliver and Alec Price) (c) defeated PME (Marino T and Philly C) by pinfall	Tag team match for the GCW Tag Team Championship	7:51
6	The Brothers of Funstruction (Ruffo The Clown and Yabo The Clown) (c) defeated The Outbreak (Abel Booker and Jacksyn Crowley) (with Barnabas The Bizarre by pinfall	Tag team match for the JCW Tag Team Championship	7:59
7	Dr. Redacted defeated Bam Sullivan by pinfall	Death match	10:28
8	2 Tuff Tony, Mickie Knuckles, and Willie Mack defeated Anthony Greene, Colby Corino, and JP Grayson (with Shane Mercer) by pinfall	Six man tag team match	7:09
9	Matt Tremont defeated Mad Man Pondo (c) by pinfall	Death match for the JCW Heavyweight Championship	15:02
(c) / – the champion(s) heading into the match
