= JCW Free-For-All =

2024 Juggalo Championship Wrestling event

Free-For-All
- Promotional poster
- Promotion: Juggalo Championship Wrestling
- Date: August 13, 2024
- City: Hebron, Ohio
- Venue: Mill Dam Corner Grille

Juggalo Championship Wrestling event chronology
← Previous; Three Town Beatdown	Next → Gathering of the Juggalos

Free-For-All was a professional wrestling event produced by Juggalo Championship Wrestling. The event took place on August 13, 2024 at the Mill Dam Corner Grille in Hebron, Ohio during the Gathering of the Juggalos music festival.

== Production ==
=== Background ===
On March 17, 2024, JCW announced the first tapings for their new show titled JCW Lunacy would take place on May 3, 2024 at the Newport Music Hall in Columbus, Ohio. Titled The Juggalos Strike Back, the show would feature various talent from the independent circuit, JCW's regular roster, All Elite Wrestling (AEW) talent, and talent from the National Wrestling Alliance (NWA). In addition to the premiere taping, JCW announced on May 20, 2024 that they would hold an additional taping at the Harpos Concert Theatre in Detroit, Michigan and would feature Matt Cardona and the debut of the Nu Backseat Boyz consisting of Tommy Grayson and JP Grayson with their manager Johnny Kashmere. On June 10, 2024, Juggalo Championship Wrestling announced that they would launch JCW Lunacy as a bi-weekly show and would feature talent from the National Wrestling Alliance (NWA), Major League Wrestling (MLW), Total Nonstop Action Wrestling (TNA), All Elite Wrestling (AEW), Lucha Libre AAA Worldwide (AAA), Big Japan Pro Wrestling (BJW), and the independent circuit alongside JCW's regular talent. However, the show's format would abruptly switch to a weekly format beginning on September 4, 2024. During the Juggalos Strike Back event, the Southern Six consisting of Kerry Morton and James Storm won the JCW Tag Team Championship after defeating the Brothers of Funstruction consisting of Yabo The Clown and Ruffo The Clown. On June 22, 2024 during the second round of tapings for JCW Lunacy, JP and Tommy Grayson made their Juggalo Championship Wrestling debut as the Backseat Boyz at a taping for JCW Lunacy at the Harpos Concert Theatre in Detroit, Michigan when they won the JCW Tag Team Championship after defeating the Southern Six (Kerry Morton and James Storm).

=== Storylines ===
Free-For-All featured professional wrestling matches that involves different wrestlers from pre-existing scripted feuds and storylines. Wrestlers portrayed villains, heroes, or less distinguishable characters in scripted events that built tension and culminated in a wrestling match or series of matches. Storylines were produced on Juggalo Championship Wrestling's various events and on their weekly show, JCW Lunacy.

== Results ==
No.	Results	Stipulations
1	Alex Taylor (c) defeated Crazzy Steve by pinfall	Singles match for the NWA World Junior Heavyweight Championship
2	Matt Cross defeated Kerry Morton by pinfall	Singles match
3	Painful Paul defeated The Midwest Misfits (Chris Malvado and Dick Ramirez) by pinfall	Two-on-one handicap match
4	??? and DJ defeated ??? and Tarzan Duran by pinfall	Tag team match
5	The Backseat Boyz (Johnny Kashmere, JP Grayson, and Tommy Grayson) (c) defeated GG Jacobs, Jason Hendrix, and Manbun Jesus by pinfall	Six-man tag team match for the JCW Tag Team Championship
6	Silas Mason defeated Alex Taylor, Chris Malvado, Crazzy Steve, Dick Ramirez, GG Jacobs, Jason Hendrix, Johnny Kashmere, JP Grayson, Kerry Morton, Manbun Jesus, Matt Cross, Painful Paul, Tarzan Duran, and Tommy Grayson	Battle royal
7	Willie Mack (c) defeated Silas Mason (with Danny Dealz) by pinfall	Singles match for the JCW Heavyweight Championship
(c) / – the champion(s) heading into the match
