= JCW Three Town Beatdown =

2024 Juggalo Championship Wrestling event

Three Town Beatdown
- Promotional poster
- Promotion: Juggalo Championship Wrestling
- Date: July 25–27, 2024
- City: Night 1: Fort Wayne, Indiana; Night 2: Newport, Kentucky; Night 3: Pontiac, Michigan
- Venue: Night 1: Piere's Entertainment Center; Night 2: MegaCorp Pavilion; Night 3: The Crofoot

Juggalo Championship Wrestling event chronology
← Previous; Juggalos Strike Back	Next → Free-For-All

Three Town Beatdown was a professional wrestling tour produced by Juggalo Championship Wrestling (JCW). The tour took place on July 25, 2024, at Piere's Entertainment Center in Fort Wayne, Indiana, July 26, 2024, at the MegaCorp Pavilion in Newport, Kentucky, and July 27, 2024, at The Crofoot in Pontiac, Michigan.

== Production ==
=== Background ===
On March 17, 2024, JCW announced the first tapings for their new show titled JCW Lunacy would take place on May 3, 2024, at the Newport Music Hall in Columbus, Ohio. Titled The Juggalos Strike Back, the show would feature various talent from the independent circuit, JCW's regular roster, All Elite Wrestling (AEW) talent, and talent from the National Wrestling Alliance (NWA). In addition to the premiere taping, JCW announced on May 20, 2024, that they would hold an additional taping at the Harpos Concert Theatre in Detroit, Michigan and would feature Matt Cardona and the debut of the Nu Backseat Boyz consisting of Tommy Grayson and JP Grayson with their manager Johnny Kashmere. On June 10, 2024, Juggalo Championship Wrestling announced that they would launch JCW Lunacy as a bi-weekly show and would feature talent from the National Wrestling Alliance (NWA), Major League Wrestling (MLW), Total Nonstop Action Wrestling (TNA), All Elite Wrestling (AEW), Lucha Libre AAA Worldwide (AAA), Big Japan Pro Wrestling (BJW), and the independent circuit alongside JCW's regular talent. However, the show's format would abruptly switch to a weekly format beginning on September 4, 2024. During the Juggalos Strike Back event, the Southern Six consisting of Kerry Morton and James Storm won the JCW Tag Team Championship after defeating the Brothers of Funstruction consisting of Yabo The Clown and Ruffo The Clown. On June 22, 2024, during the second round of tapings for JCW Lunacy, JP and Tommy Grayson made their Juggalo Championship Wrestling debut as the Backseat Boyz at a taping for JCW Lunacy at the Harpos Concert Theatre in Detroit, Michigan when they won the JCW Tag Team Championship after defeating the Southern Six (Kerry Morton and James Storm). On July 11, 2024, Psychopathic Records announced that JCW would be going on a three-night tour titled the "Three Town Beatdown.

=== Storylines ===
Three Town Beatdown featured professional wrestling matches that involves different wrestlers from pre-existing scripted feuds and storylines. Wrestlers portrayed villains, heroes, or less distinguishable characters in scripted events that built tension and culminated in a wrestling match or series of matches. Storylines were produced on Juggalo Championship Wrestling's various events and on their weekly show, JCW Lunacy.

== Results ==
Night 1 - July 25, 2024
No.	Results	Stipulations
1	Matt Cross defeated Ace Austin, Caleb Konley, and Jake Crist by pinfall	Four way match
2	Kongo Kong defeated Hurtful Kurt by pinfall	Singles match
3	The Backseat Boyz (Johnny Kashmere, JP Grayson, and Tommy Grayson) (c) defeated Breyer Wellington, Jeeves, and Quinn The Kreatchr by pinfall	Six-man tag team match for the JCW Tag Team Championship
4	Simon Gotch defeated Deputy Dickhead and Officer Colt Cabana by pinfall	Three-way match
5	Mosh Pit Mike won a battle royal	Battle royal
6	Willie Mack (c) defeated Sami Callihan by pinfall	Singles match for the JCW Heavyweight Championship
(c) / – the champion(s) heading into the match

Night 2 - July 26, 2024
No.	Results	Stipulations
1	Lord Crewe defeated Carson Drake by pinfall	Singles match
2	Mosh Pit Mike defeated Kongo Kong by pinfall	Singles match
3	Quinn The Kreatchr and Sami Callihan defeated Jake Crist and Yabo The Clown by pinfall	Tag team match
4	Hurtful Kurt defeated Simon Gotch by pinfall	Singles match
5	Matt Cross defeated Jeremiah Plunkett by pinfall	Singles match
6	Freya The Slaya defeated Jeremiah Plunkett by pinfall	Singles match
7	Ace Austin and The Backseat Boyz (Johnny Kashmere, JP Grayson, and Tommy Grayson) defeated Officer Colt Cabana and The Southern Six (Alex Taylor, Kerry Morton, and Silas Mason)	Eight-man tag team match
8	Mosh Pit Mike won a battle royal	Battle royal
9	Willie Mack (c) defeated Breyer Wellington	Singles match for the JCW Heavyweight Championship
(c) / – the champion(s) heading into the match

Night 3 - July 27, 2024
No.	Results	Stipulations
1	Mosh Pit Mike defeated Quinn The Kreatchr by pinfall	Singles match
2	Kongo Kong defeated Breyer Wellington and Jeeves by pinfall	Three-way match
3	Officer Colt Cabana defeated Matt Cross by pinfall	Singles match
4	The Southern Six (Alex Taylor, Kerry Morton, and Silas Mason) defeated ???, ???, and Simon Gotch by pinfall	Six-man tag team match
5	Yabo The Clown won a battle royal	Battle royal
6	The Backseat Boyz (JP Grayson and Tommy Grayson) (with Johnny Kashmere) (c) defeated Ace Austin and Jake Crist by pinfall	Tag team match for the JCW Tag Team Championship
7	Willie Mack (c) defeated Hurtful Kurt by pinfall	Singles match for the JCW Heavyweight Championship
(c) / – the champion(s) heading into the match
