= Quinn Whittock =

American professional wrestler

Personal information
- Born: Gary, Indiana, U.S.

Professional wrestling career
- Ring names: CoKane; Pink Kane; Yellow Kane; Cocaine; Tecquin Whittock; Warboy Whittock; Kreatchr; Quinn The Kreatchr; Vlad Bladder
- Billed weight: 180 lb (82 kg)
- Debut: December 17, 2016

Quinn Whittock, also known by his ring names CoKane, Cocaine, Yellow Kane, Pink Kane, and Quinn The Kreatchr is an American professional wrestler. He currently performs on the independent circuit, predominantly for Juggalo Championship Wrestling (JCW) where he was the former one-time JCW World Heavyweight Champion. He also has worked with Game Changer Wrestling (GCW).

== Professional wrestling career ==
=== Independent circuit (2016–present) ===
On December 17, 2016, Quinn Whittock made his professional wrestling debut as Tequin Whittock during Pro Wrestling Blitz's King of Blitz event at the Blitz Arena in Joliet, Illinois when he challenged Aiden O'Shea for the Blitz Heavyweight Championship. During the same event, Whittock was featured in a battle royal with Chris Logan, Aiden O'Shea, Joe Alonzo, Joey Dalton, Ruff Crossing, and Chris Castro.

In 2021, Whittock won the WPW Tag Team Championship with Joey Dalton under the tag team name of Deathwish, however, the team lost the title during Wisconsin Pro Wrestling's Reload event on May 13, 2022. On December 3, 2022, Whittock won the RPW Championship in a four-way match against champion Christian Rose, Eli Isom, and Marshe Rockett during Rocket Pro Wrestling's (RPW), Christmas Chaos event.

During early 2025, Whittock began performing in the independent circuit under the CoKane name starting with Loko Wrestling's No Ring, No Masters 3 at the White Swan in Houston, Texas on January 25, 2025. On March 21, 2025, CoKane fought Hoodfoot in his Horror Slam Wrestling debut at the Elk's Lodge in Livonia, Michigan during the Modern Day Nightmares event.

On May 29, 2025, CoKane made his OnlyWrestlers debut during the promotion's Chi-Town Beat Down pay-per-view at the Admiral Theatre in Chicago, Illinois in which he competed in a three-way match for the JCW Heavyweight Championship against champion Kerry Morton and Facade.

=== Juggalo Championship Wrestling (2024–present) ===
On July 25, 2024, Quinn Whittock made his Juggalo Championship Wrestling (JCW) debut under the ring name of Quinn The Kreatchr in which he teamed up with Breyer Wellington and Jeeves in a six-man tag team match for the JCW Tag Team Championship against the Backseat Boyz consisting of Johnny Kashmere, JP Grayson, and Tommy Grayson during the first night of the Three Town Beatdown tour at Pierre's Entertainment Center in Fort Wayne, Indiana. On July 26, 2024, Whittock teamed up with Sami Callihan against Jake Crist and Yabo The Clown in a tag team match at the Megacorp Pavilion in Newport, Kentucky on the second night of the Three Town Beatdown tour. On July 27, 2024, Whittock wrestled in his first JCW singles match against Mosh Pit Mike. During the Train of Terror Tour, Whittock debuted the Pink Kane character before switching to Yellow Kane and eventually to CoKane during the Devil's Night pay-per-view at the Majestic Theatre in Detroit.

On December 19, 2024, CoKane wrestled in a three-way match for the JCW American Championship against champion Caleb Konley and Tarzan Duran. However, his ring name would be changed to Cocaine during the Big Ballas Holiday Party on December 21, 2025.

On April 27, 2025, during the fourth night of the Hella Pain & Diamond Rain Tour, Cocaine teamed up with Steven Flowe to form the Flowe Caine tag team in a tag team match against the Backseat Boyz. On July 17, 2025, Cocaine challenged Caleb Konley for the JCW American Championship during the GCW x JCW Showcase Showdown: The Violence is Right pay-per-view at the Majestic Theatre in Detroit, Michigan.

On August 1, 2025, Cocaine and Steven Flowe as Flowe Caine teamed up with Magistrate Mike in a six-man tag team match against Alice Crowley, JP Grayson, and Shane Mercer during the Powder Keg pay-per-view at the Williams Center in Rutherford, New Jersey. During the 2 Day War pay-per-view on August 14–15, 2025 at Legend Valley in Thornville, Ohio, Cocaine and Steven Flowe as Flowe Caine teamed up with Luigi Primo to fight against VNDL48 consisting of Atticus Cogar, Christian Napier, and Otis Cogar in a six-man tag team match. He also competed in a twenty-man battle riot match which also featured Super Humman, The Wraith, Alec Price, Jordan Oliver, Kongo Kong, George South, Sonny Kiss, Joey Janela, and Shane Mercer.

On February 28, 2026, during the Juggalo Weekend event at Factory Town in Hialeah, Florida, CoKane cashed in his #1 contendership briefcase for the JCW World Heavyweight Championship and defeated Mr. Anderson to win the title for the first time.

=== Game Changer Wrestling (2025–present) ===
On July 4, 2025, CoKane made his Game Changer Wrestling (GCW) debut during the promotion's Backyard Wrestling 7 pay-per-view in West Creek, New Jersey in which he fought against Sleepy Ed. Following the Showcase Showdown and 2 Day War pay-per-views, Cocaine joined Team JCW which consisted of 2 Tuff Tony, Mad Man Pondo, Shane Mercer, and Willie Mack against Team GCW which consisted of Bam Sullivan, Drew Parker, Effy, Matt Tremont, and Mr. Danger in a War games match at the Fight Club: Art of War Games pay-per-view on October 11, 2025.

=== International promotions (2025–present) ===
On July 26, 2025, Whittock made his international debut as Cocaine during TNT Extreme Wrestling's Summer Explosion pay-per-view when he fought against Leonardo Darwin in a no disqualification match at the Fusion Nightclub in Liverpool, England. On May 29, 2026, Whittock made his Canadian wrestling debut as CoKane during a Greektown Pro Wrestling pay-per-view at the Ted Reeve Arena in Toronto, Ontario, Canada in which he teamed up with Alice Crowley in a tag team match against The Production consisting of Derek Dillinger and Katie Arquette.

== Championships and accomplishments ==
- Wisconsin Pro Wrestling
  - WPW Tag Team Championship (1 time) – with Joey Dalton as Deathwish
- Rocket Pro Wrestling
  - RPW Championship (1 time)
- Frontline Pro
  - Frontline Pro Heavyweight Championship (1 time)
- Juggalo Championship Wrestling
  - JCW World Heavyweight Championship (1 time)
- Pro Wrestling Illustrated
  - Ranked No. 319 of the top 500 singles wrestlers in the PWI 500 in 2026
