= JCW Powder Keg =

2025 Juggalo Championship Wrestling event

Powder Keg
- Promotional poster featuring several JCW wrestlers and Violent J
- Promotion: Juggalo Championship Wrestling
- Date: August 1, 2025
- City: Rutherford, New Jersey
- Venue: Williams Center

Juggalo Championship Wrestling event chronology
← Previous; Showcase Showdown: The Violence is Right	Next → Gathering of the Juggalos

JCW Powder Keg was a professional wrestling pay-per-view event produced by Juggalo Championship Wrestling (JCW). The show took place on August 1, 2025 at the Williams Center in Rutherford, New Jersey and was aired live on Triller TV in conjunction with Game Changer Wrestling's (GCW) SummerSmash Weekend during SummerSlam 2025 weekend.

== Production ==
Other on-screen personnel
Role:	Name:
Commentators	Mark Roberts
Commentators	Zac Amico
Commentators	Veda Scott
Ring announcer	The Ringmaster

=== Background ===
On September 14, 2024, at Game Changer Wrestling's Bad One pay-per-view in Detroit, Violent J of Insane Clown Posse would accompany a six-man tag team consisting of 2 Tuff Tony, Breyer Wellington, and Mad Man Pondo against Thrunt (1 Called Manders, Dark Sheik, and Effy) in a six man tag team match. Despite losing the match, Violent J would issue a challenge to GCW to a "2 day war" at the Gathering of the Juggalos the following year. After several exhibition matches between the two sides, Violent J would accompany 2 Tuff Tony, and the Backseat Boyz (Tommy Grayson and JP Grayson) to The People vs. GCW kickoff show at the Hammerstein Ballroom in New York City on January 21, 2025 in a pre-show rumble. 2 Tuff Tony would be the fourth wrestler to be eliminated on the rumble by former JCW Heavyweight Champion, Shane Mercer.

A JCW exhibition six man tag team match between the Backseat Boyz (Tommy Grayson and JP Grayson) and The Wraith against Dani Mo and the Brothers of Funstruction (Yabo The Clown and Ruffo The Clown) took place at GCW's Amerikaz Most Wanted pay-per-view on March 30, 2025 in Sauget, Illinois which featured Violent J on commentary along with JCW's ring announcer, The Ringmaster. Violent J would also accompany 2 Tuff Tony and Mickie Knuckles who fought against The Rejects (John Wayne Murdoch and Reed Bentley) in the main event of the show.

On April 20, 2025, during Joey Janela's Spring Break: Clusterf**k Forever pay-per-view, Mickie Knuckles, 2 Tuff Tony, the Brothers of Funstruction (Yabo The Clown and Ruffo The Clown), the Backseat Boyz (Tommy Grayson and JP Grayson), and Dani Mo entered into the Clusterf**k Battle Royal representing JCW in which they had taken control of the ring for a brief period before Matt Tremont, Bam Sullivan, Big Joe, Lou Nixon, Dr. Redacted, and John Wayne Murdoch would enter as Team GCW and would brawl backstage during the match.

On the May 1, 2025 episode of JCW Lunacy, Effy would make his debut in JCW. Several more GCW wrestlers would make appearances on various Lunacy episodes in which Joey Janela, Matt Tremont, Jimmy Lloyd, and Sonny Kiss would regularly be featured in various matches representing GCW in the build up to the 2 Day War.

During GCW's Cage of Survival 4 pay-per-view on June 8, 2025 at Showboat Atlantic City in Atlantic City, New Jersey, an eight man tag team match would take place between Team JCW (2 Tuff Tony, Mickie Knuckles, Ruffo The Clown, and Yabo The Clown) against Team GCW (Effy, Jimmy Lloyd, John Wayne Murdoch, and Matt Tremont). However, the match would be thrown out and escalate into a riot which made its way outside the Showboat.

On July 4, 2025 during GCW's Backyard Wrestling 7, Tommy Grayson of the Backseat Boyz would suffer an ankle injury during a match against YDNP (Alec Price and Jordan Oliver), forcing him to be pulled from wrestling in the months leading up to the Gathering. He would be replaced on the card for Powder Keg with Shane Mercer.

On July 17, 2025, JCW and GCW would hold a pay-per-view event titled GCW x JCW Showcase Showdown: The Violence is Right in which the main event would be Mad Man Pondo defending the JCW Heavyweight Championship against Matt Tremont in a death match. During the match, GCW owner Brett Lauderdale would intervene and result in Tremont winning the title for the first time.

=== Storylines ===
JCW Powder Keg featured professional wrestling matches that involves different wrestlers from pre-existing scripted feuds and storylines. Wrestlers portrayed villains, heroes, or less distinguishable characters in scripted events that built tension and culminated in a wrestling match or series of matches. Storylines were produced on Juggalo Championship Wrestling's various events and on their weekly internet show JCW Lunacy and on various Game Changer Wrestling pay-per-view events.

=== Aftermath ===
During the show, John Wayne Murdoch was set on fire during a match where he teamed with 1 Called Manders and Matt Tremont against the team of JCW Hall of Famers represented by 2 Tuff Tony, Mad Man Pondo, and Mickie Knuckles. At the end of the match, Murdoch would be set on fire after being suplexed through a burning table by Pondo. The match would be declared a no contest as a result. The stunt had forced him to be rushed to the hospital after the show. On the following live episode of JCW Lunacy on August 12, 2025 at the Gathering of the Juggalos, Violent J would announce that Mickie Knuckles and Mad Man Pondo have been suspended after the stunt and that Pondo would be pulled from his rematch with Matt Tremont for the JCW Heavyweight Championship. He would be replaced by 2 Tuff Tony who would challenge Tremont for the JCW Heavyweight Championship. Murdoch would not return to pro wrestling until August 23, 2025 at GCW's Homecoming Weekend pay-per-view.

== Results ==
Other on-screen personnel
Role:	Name:
Disk Jockey	DJ Clay
Commentators	Mark Roberts
Commentators	Zac Amico
Commentators	Veda Scott
Ring announcers	The Ringmaster

No.	Results	Stipulations	Times
1	St. Claire Monster Corporation (Kongo Kong and Mr. Happy) (with Jasmin St. Claire) defeated Buddy Tomas, Corazón, and Johnny Vega by pinfall	Three on two handicap match	2:02
2	Haley J (c) defeated Christina Marie by pinfall	Singles match to determine the #1 contender for the JCW Women's Championship	4:02
3	Mecha Wolf defeated Matt Cross by pinfall	Singles match	7:48
4	Alice Crowley, JP Grayson, and Shane Mercer defeated Flowe Caine (Cocaine and Steven Flowe) and Magistrate Mike by pinfall	Six man tag team match	7:55
5	Caleb Konley (with Jeeves) (c) vs. Willie Mack ended in a no contest	Singles match for the JCW American Championship	11:18
6	YDNP (Alec Price and Jordan Oliver) (c) defeated The Outbreak (Abel Booker and Jacksyn Crowley) (with Barnabas The Bizarre) by pinfall	Tag team match for the GCW Tag Team Championship	8:22
7	Drake Younger defeated Joey Janela by pinfall	Death match	20:02
8	Team GCW (1 Called Manders, John Wayne Murdoch, and Matt Tremont) vs. Team JCW Hall Of Famers (2 Tuff Tony, Mad Man Pondo, and Mickie Knuckles) ended in a no contest	Six man tag team death match	6:55
(c) / – the champion(s) heading into the match
