= JCW vs. GCW: The 2 Day War =

2025 Juggalo Championship Wrestling and Game Changer Wrestling event

- Promotional poster for night 2 featuring 2 Tuff Tony and Matt Tremont
- Promotion(s): Juggalo Championship Wrestling; Game Changer Wrestling
- Date: August 14–15, 2025
- City: Thornville, Ohio
- Venue: Legend Valley

Juggalo Championship Wrestling event chronology
← Previous; Gathering of the Juggalos	Next → Ultra Live Monster 5: Juggalo Island Show

Game Changer Wrestling event chronology
← Previous; High Noon	Next → Homecoming Weekend

JCW vs. GCW: The 2 Day War, also referred to as Bloodymania 18, was a professional wrestling pay-per-view and livestreaming event co-produced by Juggalo Championship Wrestling (JCW) and Game Changer Wrestling (GCW). The show took place on August 14, 2025 and August 15, 2025 at Legend Valley in Thornville, Ohio during the 2025 Gathering of the Juggalos. The show was aired live on Triller TV, YouTube, and Twitch.

Other on-screen personnel
Role:	Name:
Disc Jockey	DJ Clay
Commentators	Joe Dombrowski (JCW)
Commentators	Mark Roberts (JCW)
Commentators	Zac Amico (JCW)
Commentators	Brett Lauderdale (GCW)
Ring announcers	The Ringmaster (JCW)
Ring announcers	Emil Jay (GCW)
Ring announcers	Justin Roberts (JCW Tag Team Championship and GCW World Tag Team Championship match)
Ring announcers	Mr. Kennedy (JCW American Championship match)

== Production ==
=== Background ===
Since 2000, Juggalo Championship Wrestling has promoted professional wrestling matches at the annual Gathering of the Juggalos music festival organized by Psychopathic Records and the Insane Clown Posse. Pro wrestling matches at the Gathering would often feature several of JCW's regularly appearing wrestlers along with several special appearances from wrestlers like Sabu, Dusty Rhodes, Lenny Lane, Zach Gowen, Necro Butcher, and many more during its early years. On July 14, 2001, Sabu would win the JCW Heavyweight Championship in a battle royal at the Seagate Convention Centre in Toledo, Ohio. One day later, he would lose it to Vampiro who had been stripped of the title after he had stopped defending it. The 2001 Gathering also featured former World Wrestling Entertainment (WWE; at the time, the World Wrestling Federation (WWF)) and World Championship Wrestling (WCW) champion Greg Valentine fighting against The Rude Boy in a dog collar match.

From July 22-24, 2005, JCW would hold three JCW vs. TNA shows during the Gathering at Nelson Ledges Quarry Park in Garrettsville, Ohio which saw several JCW wrestlers be pitted up against TNA wrestlers. Notable wrestlers who competed were Ron Killings, D-Ray 3000, Rhino, The Blue Meanie, America's Most Wanted (James Storm and Chris Harris), Abyss, Jeff Jarrett, Team Canada (A1 and Petey Williams), and Terry Funk. Terry Funk would win the vacant JCW Heavyweight Championship during a battle royal at the event on July 23, 2005; however, he would end up losing the belt to Mad Man Pondo the following day.

On August 12, 2007, JCW would hold the inaugural Bloodymania show which was built up on JCW's internet wrestling show SlamTV! at the Hog Rock Campgrounds in Cave-In-Rock, Illinois. This show would feature several notable wrestlers like Ultimo Dragon, Scott D'Amore, Abdullah The Butcher, Jake Roberts, Tracy Smothers, Brutus Beefcake, Akira Raijin, and Scott Hall. The show would later be released on DVD on October 30, 2007 as part of SlamTV! Part 2 (featuring episodes 10-15 including East Side Wars and Bloodymania); it featured the second half of the first season of SlamTV!.

On August 14, 2011, Bloodymania 5 would become the first Bloodymania to be aired live on internet pay-per-view at the Hog Rock Campground in Cave-In-Rock, Illinois. The show was headlined by Vampiro defending the JCW Heavyweight Championship against Mad Man Pondo.

=== Storylines ===
JCW vs. GCW: The 2 Day War featured professional wrestling matches that involves different wrestlers from pre-existing scripted feuds and storylines. Wrestlers portrayed villains, heroes, or less distinguishable characters in scripted events that built tension and culminated in a wrestling match or series of matches. Storylines were produced on Juggalo Championship Wrestling's various events and on their weekly internet show JCW Lunacy and on various Game Changer Wrestling pay-per-view events.

On September 14, 2024, at Game Changer Wrestling's Bad One pay-per-view in Detroit, Violent J of Insane Clown Posse would accompany a six-man tag team consisting of 2 Tuff Tony, Breyer Wellington, and Mad Man Pondo against Thrunt (1 Called Manders, Dark Sheik, and Effy) in a six man tag team match. Despite losing the match, Violent J would issue a challenge to GCW to a "2 day war" at the Gathering of the Juggalos the following year. After several exhibition matches between the two sides, Violent J would accompany 2 Tuff Tony and the Backseat Boyz (Tommy Grayson and JP Grayson) to The People vs. GCW kickoff show at the Hammerstein Ballroom in New York City on January 21, 2025 in a pre-show rumble. 2 Tuff Tony would be the fourth wrestler to be eliminated on the rumble by former JCW Heavyweight Champion, Shane Mercer.

A JCW exhibition six wrestler tag team match between the Backseat Boyz (Tommy Grayson and JP Grayson) and The Wraith against Dani Mo and the Brothers of Funstruction (Yabo The Clown and Ruffo The Clown) took place on GCW's Amerikaz Most Wanted pay-per-view on March 30, 2025 in Sauget, Illinois which featured Violent J on commentary along with JCW's ring announcer, The Ringmaster. Violent J would also accompany 2 Tuff Tony and Mickie Knuckles who would fight against The Rejects (John Wayne Murdoch and Reed Bentley) in the main event of the show. After Amerikaz Most Wanted had ended, a riot had broken out on stage during a Violent J post-show concert where the GCW and JCW wrestlers brawled on stage during the concert and backstage.

On April 20, 2025, during the Joey Janela's Spring Break: Clusterf**k Forever pay-per-view, Mickie Knuckles, 2 Tuff Tony, the Brothers of Funstruction (Yabo The Clown and Ruffo The Clown), the Backseat Boyz (Tommy Grayson and JP Grayson), and Dani Mo entered into the Clusterf**k Battle Royal representing JCW in which they had taken control of the ring for a brief period before Matt Tremont, Bam Sullivan, Big Joe, Lou Nixon, Dr. Redacted, and John Wayne Murdoch entered as Team GCW and would brawl backstage during the match.

On the May 1, 2025 episode of JCW Lunacy, Effy would make his debut in JCW in which he would defeat Disco Ray. Several more GCW wrestlers would make appearances on various Lunacy episodes in which Joey Janela, Matt Tremont, Jimmy Lloyd, and Sonny Kiss would regularly be featured in various matches representing GCW.

During GCW's Cage of Survival 4 pay-per-view on June 8, 2025 at Showboat Atlantic City in Atlantic City, New Jersey, an eight man tag team match would be scheduled between Team JCW (2 Tuff Tony, Mickie Knuckles, Ruffo The Clown, and Yabo The Clown) against Team GCW (Effy, Jimmy Lloyd, John Wayne Murdoch, and Matt Tremont) in which the match would be thrown out and escalate into a riot which spread from the venue to the streets outside the Showboat.

On July 4, 2025 during GCW's Backyard Wrestling 7, Tommy Grayson of the Backseat Boyz suffered an ankle injury during a match against YDNP (Alec Price and Jordan Oliver), forcing him to be sidelined from wrestling in the months leading up to the Gathering. He would be replaced on the card for JCW's Powder Keg pay-per-view with Shane Mercer and Matt Cross on the 2 Day War.

On July 17, 2025, JCW and GCW held a pay-per-view event titled GCW x JCW Showcase Showdown: The Violence is Right in which the main event would be Mad Man Pondo defending the JCW Heavyweight Championship against Matt Tremont in a death match. During the match, GCW owner Brett Lauderdale would intervene and result in Tremont winning the title for the first time.

On August 2, 2025 during JCW's Powder Keg pay-per-view in Rutherford, New Jersey, John Wayne Murdoch was set on fire during a match in which he teamed with 1 Called Manders and Matt Tremont against the team of JCW Hall of Famers represented by 2 Tuff Tony, Mad Man Pondo, and Mickie Knuckles. At the end of the match, Murdoch would be set on fire after being suplexed through a burning table by Pondo. The match would be declared a no contest as a result. The stunt had forced him to be rushed to the hospital after the show. On the following live episode of JCW Lunacy on August 12, 2025 at the Gathering of the Juggalos, Violent J would announce that Mickie Knuckles and Mad Man Pondo would be suspended after the stunt and that Pondo would be pulled from his rematch with Matt Tremont for the JCW Heavyweight Championship. He would be replaced by 2 Tuff Tony who would challenge Tremont for the JCW Heavyweight Championship.

== Results ==
Night 1 - August 14, 2025
No.	Results	Stipulations	Times
1^{D}	Matt Odam won by eliminating N/A	Battle royal	—
2	Drew Parker defeated Drake Younger by pinfall	Shock and Awe death match	12:09
3	VNDL48 (Atticus Cogar, Christian Napier, and Otis Cogar) defeated Flowe Caine (Cocaine and Steven Flowe) and Luigi Primo by pinfall	Six man tag team war	13:54
4	Shane Mercer defeated Bam Sullivan by pinfall	Questionable allegiance match	8:59
5	Mosh Pit Mike defeated Tarzan Duran by pinfall	Death match	7:57
6	GCW Legends (2 Cold Scorpio, Masha Slamovich, and The Great Sasuke) defeated Team JCW (Alice Crowley, JP Grayson, and Matt Cross) (with Tommy Grayson) by pinfall	Six man tag team match	10:11
7	2 Tuff Tony defeated Joey Janela by pinfall	Street war grudge match	6:27
8	YDNP (Jordan Oliver and Alec Price) (c) GCW defeated The Brothers of Funstruction (Yabo The Clown and Ruffo The Clown) (c) JCW by pinfall	Tag team match for the JCW Tag Team Championship and GCW Tag Team Championship	4:14
(c) / – the champion(s) heading into the match; D / – this was a dark match

Night 2 - August 15, 2025
No.	Results	Stipulations	Times
1	Atticus Cogar defeated Nic Nemeth by pinfall	Singles match	9:01
2	Alice Crowley (c) defeated Brooke Havok, Haley J, and Priscilla Kelly by pinfall	Four way match for the JCW Women's Championship	3:41
3	Caleb Konley (with Jeeves) (c) defeated The Great Sasuke by pinfall	Singles match for the JCW American Championship	8:13
4	The Outbreak (Abel Booker and Jacksyn Crowley) (with Barnabas The Bizarre) defeated Nate Webb and PCO by pinfall	Tag team match	5:48
5	Effy (c) defeated Willie Mack by pinfall	Singles match for the GCW World Championship	4:56
6	Joey Janela defeated Alec Price, Bam Sullivan, Christian Napier, Cocaine, Drew Parker, George South, Jeffrey John, Jordan Oliver, JP Grayson, Kongo Kong, Luigi Primo, Mosh Pit Mike, Mr. Happy, Otis Cogar, Shane Mercer, Sonny Kiss, Super Humman, Tarzan Duran, and The Wraith by eliminating Super Humman	20 man battle riot	14:01
7	2 Tuff Tony defeated Matt Tremont (c) by pinfall	Barbed wire death match for the JCW Heavyweight Championship	21:16
(c) / – the champion(s) heading into the match
