= Juggalos Strike Back =

2024 Juggalo Championship Wrestling event

- Promotional poster
- Promotion: Juggalo Championship Wrestling
- Date: May 3, 2024 (aired August 28, 2024, September 4, 2024, September 11, 2024, and September 18, 2024)
- City: Columbus, Ohio
- Venue: Newport Music Hall

Juggalo Championship Wrestling event chronology
← Previous; Juggalo Weekend	Next → Three Town Beatdown

Juggalos Strike Back was a professional wrestling event produced by Juggalo Championship Wrestling (JCW). The event took place on May 3, 2024 at the Newport Music Hall in Columbus, Ohio. The event also served as tapings for the first four episodes of JCW Lunacy which aired on August 28, 2024, September 4, 2024, September 11, 2024, and September 18, 2024 on YouTube. This show also featured wrestlers from the National Wrestling Alliance (NWA) including the Southern Six and NWA commentator Joe Galli. Ouija Macc, owner of Chapter 17 Records, would also hold a post-show concert after the event.

== Production ==
=== Background ===
On February 23, 2024, during the 2024 Juggalo Weekend at the Boeing Center at Tech Port in San Antonio, Texas, Willie Mack won the JCW Heavyweight Championship during a battle royal.

On March 15, 2024, JCW announced the first tapings for their new show titled JCW Lunacy would take place on May 3, 2024 at the Newport Music Hall in Columbus, Ohio. Titled The Juggalos Strike Back, the show would feature various talent from the independent circuit, JCW's regular roster, All Elite Wrestling (AEW) talent, and talent from the National Wrestling Alliance (NWA). On March 21, 2024, it was announced that Ouija Macc would be having a concert at the event. On March 25, 2024, it was also announced that the first match for the event would be Matt Cross vs. Facade.

=== Storylines ===
Juggalos Strike Back featured professional wrestling matches that involves different wrestlers from pre-existing scripted feuds and storylines. Wrestlers portrayed villains, heroes, or less distinguishable characters in scripted events that built tension and culminated in a wrestling match or series of matches. Storylines were produced on Juggalo Championship Wrestling's various events and on their weekly show, JCW Lunacy.

=== Aftermath ===
In addition to the premiere taping, JCW announced on May 20, 2024 that they would hold an additional taping at the Harpos Concert Theatre in Detroit, Michigan and would feature Matt Cardona and the debut of the Nu Backseat Boyz consisting of Tommy Grayson and JP Grayson with their manager Johnny Kashmere. On June 10, 2024, Juggalo Championship Wrestling announced that they would launch JCW Lunacy as a bi-weekly show and would feature talent from the National Wrestling Alliance (NWA), Major League Wrestling (MLW), Total Nonstop Action Wrestling (TNA), All Elite Wrestling (AEW), Lucha Libre AAA Worldwide (AAA), Big Japan Pro Wrestling (BJW), and the independent circuit alongside JCW's regular talent. However, the show's format would abruptly switch to a weekly format beginning on September 4, 2024. On August 28, 2024, the first episode of JCW Lunacy premiered on the Psychopathic Records YouTube channel.

== Results ==
Other on-screen personnel
Role:	Name:
Commentators	Joe Galli
Commentators	Manny Fresh
Interviewer	Joe Galli

No.	Results	Stipulations	Times
1	Dani Mo defeated Alice Crowley by pinfall	Singles match	5:32
2	The Brothers of Funstruction (Ruffo The Clown and Yabo The Clown) (c) defeated Caleb Konley and Facade by pinfall	Tag team match for the JCW Tag Team Championship	6:02
3	The Southern Six (Alex Taylor, Kerry Morton, and Silas Mason) defeated Matt Cross, Santana Jackson, and Willie Mack by pinfall	Six-man tag team match	6:22
4	Caleb Konley defeated Facade by pinfall	Singles match	7:41
5	Redwood Giants (Hurtful Kurt and Painful Paul) (with Eric Smalls) defeated Breyer Wellington and James Ellsworth by pinfall	Tag team match	5:23
6	Kongo Kong defeated Tyler Fox by pinfall	Battle royal	0:18
7	Willie Mack (c) defeated Matt Cross by pinfall	Singles match for the JCW Heavyweight Championship	7:03
8	The Ultimate Ellsworth defeated Breyer Wellington (with Jeeves) by pinfall	Singles match	0:18
9	Alice Crowley defeated Dani Mo by pinfall	Singles match	1:58
10	Kongo Kong (with Eric Smalls) defeated Jeffrey John by pinfall	Singles match	1:41
11	James Storm and The Brothers of Funstruction (Ruffo The Clown and Yabo The Clown) vs. The Southern Six (Alex Taylor, Kerry Morton, and Silas Mason) ended in a no contest	Six-man tag team match	—
12	Kongo Kong (with Eric Smalls) defeated Santana Jackson by pinfall	Singles match	0:58
13	Willie Mack (c) defeated Matt Cross by pinfall	Singles match for the JCW Heavyweight Championship	8:01
14	The Southern Six (James Storm and Kerry Morton) (with Alex Taylor and Silas Mason) defeated The Brothers of Funstruction (Ruffo The Clown and Yabo The Clown) (c) by pinfall	Tag team match for the JCW Tag Team Championship	4:03
(c) / – the champion(s) heading into the match
