= GCW Amerikaz Most Wanted (2025) =

2025 Game Changer Wrestling pay-per-view event

Amerikaz Most Wanted
- Promotion: Game Changer Wrestling
- Date: March 30, 2025
- City: Sauget, Illinois
- Venue: Pop's Nightclub

Game Changer Wrestling event chronology
← Previous; No Compadre	Next → The Philly Special

Amerikaz Most Wanted was a professional wrestling pay-per-view event produced by Game Changer Wrestling. The show took place on March 30, 2025 at Pop's Nightclub in Sauget, Illinois and was streamed live on Triller TV. The show also featured wrestlers from Juggalo Championship Wrestling (JCW) and featured a post-show concert by Juggalo Championship wrestling owner, Violent J of the horrorcore hip-hop duo, the Insane Clown Posse.

== Production ==
Other on-screen personnel
Role:	Name:
Commentators	Emil Jay
Commentators	Nick Maniwa
Commentators	Violent J
Ring announcers
Ring announcers	Emil Jay
Ring announcers	The Ringmaster

=== Background ===
On September 14, 2024, at Game Changer Wrestling's Bad One pay-per-view in Detroit, Violent J of Insane Clown Posse made an appearance during a six-man tag team consisting of 2 Tuff Tony, Breyer Wellington, and Mad Man Pondo, who Violent J had accompanied, against Thrunt (1 Called Manders, Dark Sheik, and Effy) in a six man tag team match. Despite losing the match, Violent J issued a challenge to GCW to a "2 day war" at the Gathering of the Juggalos the following year. On November 15, 2024, Mance Warner defended the GCW World Championship against 2 Tuff Tony during the Chaos in Kentucky pay-per-view in Louisville, Kentucky. After several exhibition matches between the two sides, Violent J accompanied 2 Tuff Tony and the Backseat Boyz (2023) (Tommy Grayson and JP Grayson) to The People vs. GCW kickoff show at the Hammerstein Ballroom in New York City on January 21, 2025 in a pre-show rumble. 2 Tuff Tony was 25th wrestler to be eliminated on the rumble when he got thrown over the top rope former JCW Heavyweight Champion, Shane Mercer.

=== Storylines ===
Amerikaz Most Wanted featured professional wrestling matches that involves different wrestlers from pre-existing scripted feuds and storylines. Wrestlers portrayed villains, heroes, or less distinguishable characters in scripted events that built tension and culminated in a wrestling match or series of matches. Storylines were produced on Game Changer Wrestling's various pay-per-view events.

== Results ==
No.	Results	Stipulations	Times
1	Alec Price, Bang And Matthews (August Matthews and Davey Bang), and Brooke Havok defeated Dan The Dad, Kody Lane, and The New Guys (Jake Bosche and Scott Stanley)	Eight wrestler tag team match	10:41
2	Megan Bayne defeated Zayda Steel	Singles match	9:22
3	Dani Mo and the Brothers of Funstruction (Ruffo The Clown and Yabo The Clown) defeated The Backseat Boyz (JP Grayson and Tommy Grayson) and The Wraith	Six wrestler tag team match	7:39
4	Mance Warner defeated Gary Jay	Singles match	15:41
5	Masha Slamovich (c) defeated Blake Christian, Caleb Konley, and Jimmy Lloyd	Four way match for the JCW World Championship	10:32
6	Otis Cogar defeated Sam Stackhouse	Death match	9:20
7	Effy (c) defeated Dr. Redacted	Death match for the GCW World Championship	16:19
8	Matt Tremont (c) defeated The Bev	Death match for the GCW Ultraviolent Championship	7:53
9	2 Tuff Tony and Mickie Knuckles (with Violent J) defeated The Rejects (John Wayne Murdoch and Reed Bentley)	Tag team death match	14:58
(c) / – the champion(s) heading into the match
