= Effy =

Effy may refer to:

- Effy Stonem, a fictional character in the television series Skins
- Effy (Skins series 1), an episode of Skins
- Effy (wrestler), American professional wrestler
- Effy Irvine, the first woman in Scotland to run a parish
