= Brothers of Funstruction =

- Yabo the Clown (left) and Ruffo the Clown (right) as the JCW Tag Team Champions

Statistics
- Members: Yabo The Clown; Ruffo The Clown
- Debut: 2015

The Brothers of Funstruction are a professional wrestling tag team that consists of Yabo The Clown and Ruffo The Clown who are known for their work in Juggalo Championship Wrestling (JCW) where they were two-time JCW Tag Team Champions, the National Wrestling Alliance (NWA), and Game Changer Wrestling (GCW) where they were the GCW Tag Team Champions. They have also worked with Lucha Libre AAA Worldwide (AAA), The Crash Lucha Libre, WrestleCade, and in the independent circuit.

== Professional wrestling career ==
=== Independent circuit (2015–present) ===
The team dates back to 2006 when Yabo The Clown and Ruffo The Clown were going by the ring names of Thunderfoot and Ruff Crossing. On September 8, 2007, the duo challenged The Mob (Tommy Capone and Trevor Blanchard) for the POWW Tag Team Championship during POWW The Road to WrestleRage Tour 2007. The duo won the match by disqualification however.

On August 21, 2015, the duo made their Freelance Wrestling debut as Yabo The Clown and Ruffo The Clown at their Thrash Gordon event in Chicago, Illinois when they challenged the team of The N Words (Acid Jaz and Bryce Benjamin) for the Freelance Tag Team Championship. On December 4, 2015 during Freelance's Raw Power event, the duo debuted the Brothers of Funstruction name when they teamed up with The N Words (Acid Jaz and Bryce Benjamin) to fight against Team Ramshackle (Christian Rose, Craig Mitchell, Mallaki Matthews, and The Masked Character) in an eight-man tag team match.

=== Juggalo Championship Wrestling (2021–present) ===
On April 10, 2021, the Brothers of Funstruction made their Juggalo Championship Wrestling (JCW) debut when they fought Moshpit Mike and Chuey Martinez in a steel cage match at JCW's Fenced in Fury at the Folsom Felony Funhouse in Farmington Hills, Michigan.

On the September 18, 2024 episode of JCW Lunacy, the Brothers of Funstruction lost the JCW Tag Team Championship to the Southern Six (James Storm and Kerry Morton). However, the duo won the title back in a tournament for the tag team titles on the April 10, 2024 episode of Lunacy in which they faced the Backseat Boyz (Tommy Grayson and JP Grayson) in a finals match.

On August 14, 2025 during the JCW vs. GCW: The 2 Day War pay-per-view, the duo lost the tag team titles to YDNP (Jordan Oliver and Alec Price) in a match in which the GCW Tag Team Championship was also on the line.

=== National Wrestling Alliance (2023) ===
On June 3, 2023 during the Crockett Cup, JCW Tag Team Champions, the Brothers of Funstruction, were featured as participants on the tournament. They advanced to the second and quarter-final rounds after defeating The Fixers (Jay Bradley and Wrecking Ball Legursky) and A Cut Above (Rhett Titus and Thom Latimer) on the first night of the tournament, however, they were defeated by Los Jinetes del Aire (Myzteziz Jr. and Octagon Jr.). The Brothers of Funstruction made their NWA Powerrr debut on the July 11, 2023 episode and fought against La Rebellion (Bestia 666 and Mecha Wolf).

On August 26, 2023, during the NWA 75 pay-per-view, Violent J became the manager of the Brothers of Funstruction in the NWA and accompanied the team to the ring against Magnum Muscle (Mims and Dak Draper). The team also fought against La Rebellion accompanied by Vampiro the following night. On October 28, 2023, during the Samhain pay-per-view, Violent J teamed up with the Brothers of Funstruction against La Rebellion (Bestia 666 and Mecha Wolf) and Vampiro in a six-man tag team Riddlebox match.

=== Game Changer Wrestling (2025–present) ===
On March 30, 2025, the Brothers of Funstruction made their Game Changer Wrestling (GCW) debut during the Amerikaz Most Wanted pay-per-view at Pop's Nightclub in Sauget, Illinois during an exhibition six-wrestler tag team match when they teamed up with Dani Mo against the Backseat Boyz (Tommy Grayson and JP Grayson) and The Wraith. On June 8, 2025 during the Cage of Survival 4 pay-per-view at Showboat Atlantic City in Atlantic City, New Jersey, the Brothers of Funstruction were scheduled to compete in an eight wrestler tag team match in which they teamed up with 2 Tuff Tony and Mickie Knuckles against Effy, Jimmy Lloyd, John Wayne Murdoch, and Matt Tremont in a Team JCW vs. Team GCW match. However, wrestlers representing JCW including Willie Mack, the Backseat Boyz, Alice Crowley, Dani Mo, and Shane Mercer along with JCW owner Violent J interrupted the match and resulted in it being declared a no contest. Despite the match being thrown out, the two teams continued to brawl into the streets surrounding the venue.

On September 12, 2025 at the Evil Deeds pay-per-view at the Harpos Concert Theatre in Detroit, Michigan, the duo won back the JCW Tag Team Championship from YDNP (Jordan Oliver and Alec Price) in addition to winning the GCW Tag Team Championship for the first time in a Riddlebox match.

== Championships and accomplishments ==
- ACW Wisconsin
  - ACW Tag Team Championship
- Freelance Wrestling
  - FU Tag Team Championship (2 times)
- Juggalo Championship Wrestling
  - JCW Tag Team Championship (4 times)
- Brew City Wrestling
  - BCW Tag Team Championship (1 time)
- Chicago Style Wrestling
  - CSW Tag Team Championship (1 time)
- Game Changer Wrestling
  - GCW Tag Team Championship (1 time)
