= The Williams Center (theater) =

Theater and movie theater in New Jersey, U.S.

Coordinates: 40.8271°N 74.1030°W

Williams Center
- William Carlos Williams Center for the Performing Arts, The Willy
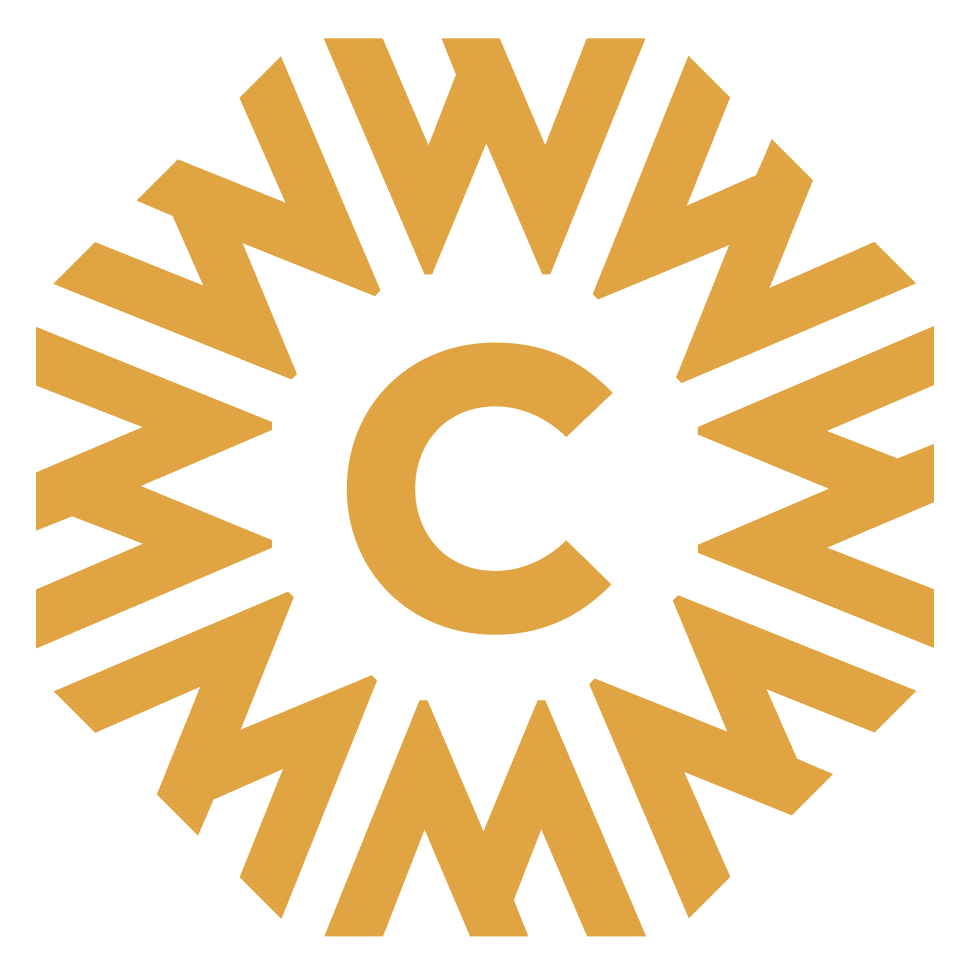

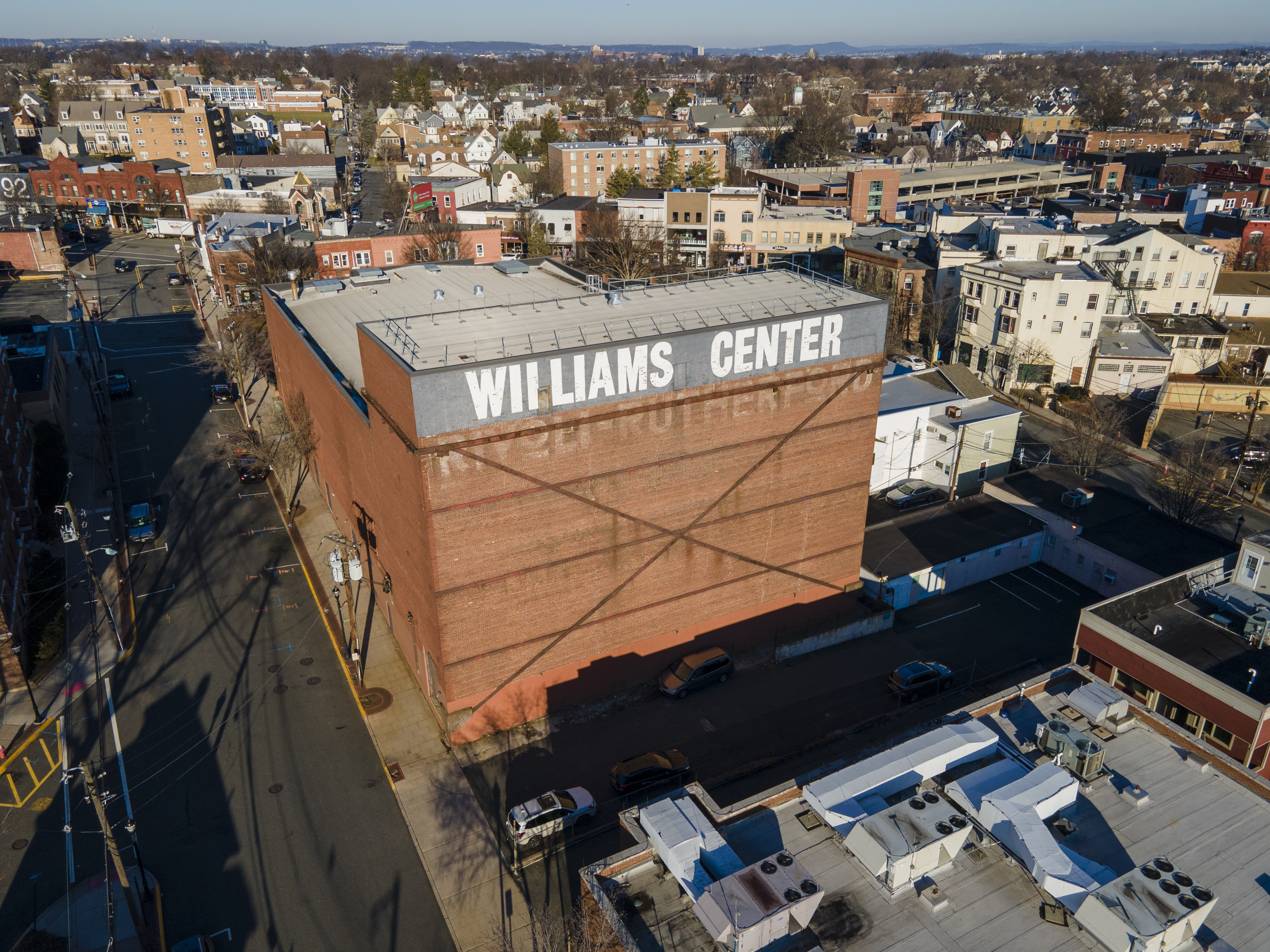
- Interactive map of Williams Center
- Former names: Rivoli Theatre, William Carlos Williams Center for the Performing Arts
- Location: 1 Williams Plaza, Rutherford, New Jersey 07070
- Owner: Native Development LLC
- Type: Theater [(performing arts)]

Construction
- Built: 1920s
- Renovated: 1982, 2006, 2008

Website
- www.williamscenter.co

The Williams Center is an arts center and cinema complex located in downtown Rutherford, New Jersey. The center was named after the Pulitzer Prize winning poet and physician William Carlos Williams, who had been born and raised in the borough. The building it occupies was originally built in the 1920s as a Vaudeville theater known as the Rivoli. The Rivoli soon started showing silent movies, and eventually "talkies". The theater enjoyed success, until fire destroyed part of the building in 1977. In 1978, a group of philanthropists started the Williams Center Project, which reopened the Center in 1982. The center currently has two live theaters, three cinemas, and an open-air meeting gallery. As of 2021, the town of Rutherford bought the center from Bergen County, before selling it to local real estate developer Native Development; those sales, along with outcry from concerned local residents, were said to have saved the property from further redevelopment.

== Current uses ==
On July 29, 2016, the three cinemas, and downstairs floor, both reopened for first run movies, after successful fundraising efforts to switch from 35mm projectors to digital. This includes refurbished concession stands, lobby spaces, and a party room, which has now been turned into an arcade. The building is currently undergoing a large-scale renovation while hosting weekly art and music events.

== History ==
The Rivoli Theater debuted in Rutherford in April 1922 with a capacity for 2,200 audience members. Built by architect Abram Preiskel and developer Harry Hecht above the Glen Waters pond, the building featured a marble facade, ornate proscenium, and a centerpiece chandelier, made of 62,000 Czechoslovak crystals. The theater played host to silent films and was a popular stop in the vaudeville circuit. Acts such as Abbott and Costello and the Glenn Miller Orchestra performed under The Rivoli's signature chandelier, and silent movies starring Buster Keaton and Douglas Fairbanks, Jr., delighted audiences. The Theater continued operation, with brief interruptions, until January 1977, when a devastating fire destroyed nearly one third of the building. The theater's future was in doubt, until a group of philanthropists led by Fairleigh Dickinson (namesake of the nearby university campus), Peter and Sally Sammartino, Oscar Schwidetsky, Barry Dancy, and Herb Cutter, saved the theater, and started the nonprofit Williams Center Project. The theater's name was changed to the William Carlos Williams Center for the Performing Arts, after the famed poet, doctor, and Rutherford native, and the newly renovated venue opened its doors to the public in 1982.

In 1987, the building was deeded to Bergen County, and a lease agreement was reached with the nonprofit group to continue operating the center. The center continued to serve the community, hosting live theater, music shows, movies, and art shows, and functioned as a hub for the broader community, as many Rutherfordians remember graduating from Rutherford High School on its main stage.
