= The Backseat Boyz (2023) =

Professional wrestling tag team

Backseat Boyz

Statistics
- Members: JP Grayson; Tommy Grayson
- Name(s): Amazing Graysons; NÜ Backseatz; The Backseat Boyz; NÜ Graysons
- Hometown: Rockland County, New York
- Billed from: Psychopathic Records (JCW)
- Debut: 2015 (as the Amazing Graysons); 2023 (as the Nu Backseatz/Backset Boyz)
- Trained by: Gino Caruso (East Coast Pro Wrestling); Kodiak Bear (East Coast Pro Wrestling); Dan Maff (Create A Pro Wrestling); Mario Bokara (Create A Pro Wrestling); Pat Buck (Create A Pro Wrestling); Mike Santana

The Backseat Boyz are a professional wrestling tag team that consists of brothers JP Grayson and Tommy Grayson. They perform on the independent circuit and also serve as part-owners of Super Powers of Wrestling (SPO) and its sister Pro Wrestling Unplugged (PWU).

== Professional wrestling career ==
=== Independent circuit (2015–present) ===
On January 25, 2023, it was announced that the Graysons would be bestowed the Backseat Boyz tag team name by former Backseat Boyz member Johnny Kashmere. JP and Tommy Grayson debuted the gimmick on March 18, 2023 at ESW's Tough Luck A passing-of-the-torch ceremony was held during Wrestling Is Now’s Big Fight on March 31, 2023 which featured Johnny Kashmere.

On the February 1, 2025 episode of Memphis Wrestling, the Backseat Boyz defended the JCW Tag Team Championship against Big Nasty Phil and Main Event Bradley.

=== Game Changer Wrestling (2019–present) ===
On July 14, 2019, JP and Tommy Grayson made their Game Changer Wrestling debuts during 5150 – A Tribute To Homicide in a battle royal.

On January 21, 2025 at The People vs. GCW in New York City, JP Grayson entered a pre-show rumble alongside his tag team partner Tommy Grayson and JCW American Champion 2 Tuff Tony who were both accompanied by Juggalo Championship Wrestling owner Violent J. During Amerikaz Most Wanted, JP Grayson and Tommy Grayson teamed up with The Wraith to take on Dani Mo and the Brothers of Funstruction (Yabo The Clown and Ruffo The Clown) in a JCW exhibition six man tag team match.

on March 30, 2025, a JCW exhibition six man tag team match between the Backseat Boyz and The Wraith against Dani Mo and the Brothers of Funstruction (Yabo The Clown and Ruffo The Clown) took place on GCW's Amerikaz Most Wanted in Sauget, Illinois which featured Violent J on commentary.

On April 20, 2025, during the Joey Janela's Spring Break: Clusterf**k Forever, the Backseat Boyz teamed up with Mickie Knuckles, 2 Tuff Tony, the Brothers of Funstruction (Yabo The Clown and Ruffo The Clown), , and Dani Mo to enter into the Clusterf**k Battle Royal representing JCW in which they had taken control of the ring for a brief period before Matt Tremont, Bam Sullivan, Big Joe, Lou Nixon, Dr. Redacted, and John Wayne Murdoch entered as Team GCW. The two teams proceeded to brawl backstage during the match.

On July 4, 2025 during GCW's Backyard Wrestling 7, Tommy Grayson suffered an ankle injury during a match against YDNP (Alec Price and Jordan Oliver), forcing him to be sidelined from wrestling until March 6, 2026. He was replaced on the cards for upcoming shows including GCW x JCW Showcase Showdown: The Violence is Right, JCW Powder Keg, and JCW vs. GCW: The 2 Day War.

=== All Elite Wrestling (2021) ===
On June 4, 2021, JP and Tommy Grayson made their All Elite Wrestling debut during a taping for the June 8, 2021 episode of AEW Dark at Daily's Place in Jacksonville, Florida where they fought the Chaos Project (Luther and Serpentico). This was their only AEW match and have not competed in the promotion since.

=== Combat Zone Wrestling (2021–2024) ===
On December 19, 2021, JP Grayson and Tommy Grayson made their Combat Zone Wrestling debut at The Fight Within in a tag team match against Prolific (Isaiah Wolf and Marcus Marquee).

During CZW's 25th anniversary show on February 4, 2024, the Backseat Boyz challenged Milk Chocolate (Brandon Watts and Randy Summers) for the CZW Tag Team Championship.

=== Juggalo Championship Wrestling (2024–present) ===
On June 22, 2024, JP and Tommy Grayson made their Juggalo Championship Wrestling debut as the Backseat Boyz at a taping for JCW Lunacy at the Harpos Concert Theatre in Detroit, Michigan when they won the JCW Tag Team Championship after defeating the Southern Six (Kerry Morton and James Storm). This match aired on the September 25, 2024 episode of JCW Lunacy. On the October 9, 2024 episode of JCW Lunacy, JP and Tommy Grayson teamed up with their manager and original Backseat Boyz member Johnny Kashmere in a six man tag team match against Kongo Kong and the Redwood Giants (Hurtful Kurt and Painful Paul).

On the October 29, 2024 special Train of Terror Tour edition of JCW Lunacy, the Backseat Boyz lost the JCW Tag Team Championship to Bang And Matthews (August Matthews and Davey Bang). The duo regained the belts the following night during the Devil's Night pay-per-view at the Majestic Theatre in Detroit, Michigan.

Due to Tommy Grayson suffering an ankle injury at Game Changer Wrestling's Backyard Wrestling 7, JP Grayson teamed up in several six man tag team matches with Colby Corino, Alice Crowley, Anthony Greene, and Shane Mercer. JP Grayson also took part in a 20 man battle riot during JCW vs. GCW: The 2 Day War on August 15, 2025 at Legend Valley in Thornville, Ohio.

On April 18, 2026, the Backseat Boyz made their return to JCW during the Strangle-Mania: Viva Las Violence pay-per-view at Horseshoe Las Vegas in Paradise, Nevada in a three way "freak show" tag team match against The Outbreak (Jacksyn Crowley and Abel Booker) and the Brothers of Funstruction (Yabo The Clown and Ruffo The Clown).

== Championships and accomplishments ==
- Battlefield Pro Wrestling
  - BPW Tag Team Championship (1 time, current)
- East Coast Pro Wrestling
  - ECPW Tag Team Championship (1 time)
- For Us Wrestling
  - FUW Trios Championship (1 time, current) – with Johnny Kashmere
- Juggalo Championship Wrestling
  - JCW Tag Team Championship (2 times)
- Pro Wrestling Magic
  - PWM Tag Team Championship (1 time)
- Pro Wrestling Unplugged
  - PWU Tag Team Championship (1 time, current)
- SuperKrazee Pro Wrestling
  - SKPW Tag Team Championship (1 time)
- Super Powers of Wrestling
  - SPO Tag Team Championship (2 times)
- WrestlePro
  - WrestlePro Tag Team Championship (1 time)
  - WrestlePro Alaska Tag Team Championship (1 time)
- Wrestling Is Now
  - WIN Tag Team Championship (2 times)
- Xcite Wrestling
  - Xcite Tag Team Championship (1 time)
