= Tommy Grayson =

American professional wrestler

- Grayson in July 2026 with the SPO Championship

Personal information
- Born: February 16, 1994 (age 32) Stony Point, New York, U.S.

Professional wrestling career
- Ring names: Tommy Grayson; Tommy Daily; Darryl Grayson
- Trained by: Gino Caruso (East Coast Pro Wrestling); Kodiak Bear (East Coast Pro Wrestling); Dan Maff (Create A Pro Wrestling); Mario Bokara (Create A Pro Wrestling); Pat Buck (Create A Pro Wrestling); Danny Cage Mike Santana
- Debut: 2014

Spencer Andrew DuBoff, better known by his ring name, Tommy Grayson, is an American professional wrestler, actor, and promoter. He is best known for his work in WrestlePro where he was the WrestlePro Tag Team Champion and the WrestlePro Alaska Tag Team Champion with JP Grayson as the Amazing Graysons, Juggalo Championship Wrestling where he was a three-time JCW Tag Team Champion with JP Grayson, Game Changer Wrestling (GCW), Pro Wrestling Unplugged (PWU) and their sister promotion Super Powers of Wrestling (SPO) where he is a former SPO Champion as well as currently 1/2 of the PWU Tag Team Champions with JP Grayson as the Backseat Boyz. He has also worked with All Elite Wrestling (AEW), Combat Zone Wrestling (CZW), House of Glory (HOG), Memphis Wrestling, and the United Wrestling Network (UWN).

== Professional wrestling career ==
=== Independent circuit (2014–present) ===
After feuding with each other for several weeks at that point, Tommy Grayson and his brother JP Grayson fought each other in a chairs are legal match on the April 14, 2022 edition of Beyond Wrestling's Wrestling Open. On January 25, 2023, it was announced that the Graysons would be bestowed the Backseat Boyz tag team name by former Backseat Boyz member Johnny Kashmere. JP and Tommy Grayson debuted the gimmick on March 18, 2023, at ESW's Tough Luck A passing-of-the-torch ceremony was held during Wrestling Is Now's Big Fight on March 31, 2023, which featured Johnny Kashmere.

=== Game Changer Wrestling (2019–present) ===
On July 14, 2019, JP and Tommy Grayson made their Game Changer Wrestling debuts during 5150 – A Tribute To Homicide in a battle royal. They were both simultaneously eliminated by Bull James[5]

On January 21, 2025, at The People vs. GCW in New York City, Tommy Grayson entered a pre-show rumble alongside his tag team partner JP Grayson and JCW American Champion 2 Tuff Tony who were both accompanied by Juggalo Championship Wrestling owner Violent J. During Amerikaz Most Wanted, JP Grayson and Tommy Grayson teamed up with The Wraith to take on Dani Mo and the Brothers of Funstruction (Yabo The Clown and Ruffo The Clown) in a JCW exhibition six man tag team match.

On March 30, 2025, a JCW exhibition six man tag team match between the Backseat Boyz and The Wraith against Dani Mo and the Brothers of Funstruction (Yabo The Clown and Ruffo The Clown) took place on GCW's Amerikaz Most Wanted in Sauget, Illinois which featured Violent J on commentary.

On April 20, 2025, during the Joey Janela's Spring Break: Clusterf**k Forever, JP and Tommy Grayson teamed up with Mickie Knuckles, 2 Tuff Tony, the Brothers of Funstruction (Yabo The Clown and Ruffo The Clown), and Dani Mo to enter into the Clusterf**k Battle Royal representing JCW in which they had taken control of the ring for a brief period before Matt Tremont, Bam Sullivan, Big Joe, Lou Nixon, Dr. Redacted, and John Wayne Murdoch entered as Team GCW. The two teams proceeded to brawl backstage during the match.

On July 4, 2025, during GCW's Backyard Wrestling 7, Grayson suffered an ankle injury during a match against YDNP (Alec Price and Jordan Oliver), forcing him to be sidelined from wrestling until March 6, 2026. He was replaced on the cards for upcoming shows including GCW x JCW Showcase Showdown: The Violence is Right, JCW Powder Keg, and JCW vs. GCW: The 2 Day War.

=== All Elite Wrestling (2021) ===
On June 4, 2021, JP and Tommy Grayson made their All Elite Wrestling debut during a taping for the June 8, 2021 episode of AEW Dark at Daily's Place in Jacksonville, Florida where they fought the Chaos Project (Luther and Serpentico). This was their only AEW match and have not competed in the promotion since.

=== Combat Zone Wrestling (2021–2024) ===
On December 19, 2021, JP Grayson and Tommy Grayson made their Combat Zone Wrestling debut at The Fight Within in a tag team match against Prolific (Isaiah Wolf and Marcus Marquee).

During CZW's 25th anniversary show on February 4, 2024, the Backseat Boyz challenged Milk Chocolate (Brandon Watts and Randy Summers) for the CZW Tag Team Championship.

=== Juggalo Championship Wrestling (2024–present) ===
On June 22, 2024, JP and Tommy Grayson made their Juggalo Championship Wrestling debut as the Backseat Boyz at a taping for JCW Lunacy at the Harpos Concert Theatre in Detroit, Michigan when they won the JCW Tag Team Championship after defeating the Southern Six (Kerry Morton and James Storm). This match aired on the September 25, 2024 episode of JCW Lunacy. On the October 9, 2024 episode of JCW Lunacy, JP and Tommy Grayson teamed up with their manager and original Backseat Boyz member Johnny Kashmere in a six man tag team match against Kongo Kong and the Redwood Giants (Hurtful Kurt and Painful Paul).

On the October 29, 2024 special Train of Terror Tour edition of JCW Lunacy, the Backseat Boyz lost the JCW Tag Team Championship to Bang And Matthews (August Matthews and Davey Bang). The duo regained the belts the following night during the Devil's Night pay-per-view at the Majestic Theatre in Detroit, Michigan.

Due to Tommy Grayson suffering an ankle injury at Game Changer Wrestling's Backyard Wrestling 7, JP Grayson teamed up in several six man tag team matches with Colby Corino, Alice Crowley, Anthony Greene, and Shane Mercer. JP Grayson also took part in a 20 man battle riot during JCW vs. GCW: The 2 Day War on August 15, 2025 at Legend Valley in Thornville, Ohio.

On April 18, 2026, the Backseat Boyz made their return to JCW during the Strangle-Mania: Viva Las Violence pay-per-view at Horseshoe Las Vegas in Paradise, Nevada in a three way "freak show" tag team match against The Outbreak (Jacksyn Crowley and Abel Booker) and the Brothers of Funstruction (Yabo The Clown and Ruffo The Clown).

== Championships and accomplishments ==
- Battlefield Pro Wrestling
  - BPW Tag Team Championship (1 time) Current – with JP Grayson as the Backseat Boyz
- Pro Wrestling Magic
  - PWM Tag Team Championship (1 time) – with JP Grayson as the Amazing Graysons
- East Coast Pro Wrestling
  - ECPW Tag Team Championship (1 time) – with JP Grayson as the Amazing Graysons
- WrestlePro
  - WrestlePro Tag Team Championship (1 time) – with JP Grayson as the Amazing Graysons
  - WrestlePro Alaska Tag Team Championship (1 time) – with JP Grayson as the Amazing Graysons
- Xcite Wrestling
  - Xcite Tag Team Championship (1 time) – with JP Grayson as the NÜ BackSeatz
- Wrestling Is Now
  - WIN Tag Team Championship (2 times) – with JP Grayson as the NÜ BackSeatz
- SuperKrazee Pro Wrestling
  - SKPW Tag Team Championship (1 time) – with JP Grayson as the Backseat Boyz
- Super Powers of Wrestling / Pro Wrestling Unplugged
  - SPO Tag Team Championship (2 times) – with JP Grayson as the Backseat Boyz
  - PWU Tag Team Championship (1 time) – with JP Grayson as the Backseat Boyz
  - SPO World Championship (1 time)
- Juggalo Championship Wrestling
  - JCW Tag Team Championship (3 times) – with JP Grayson as the Backseat Boyz
- For Us Wrestling
  - FUW Trios Championship (1 time) – with JP Grayson and Johnny Kashmere as the Backseat Boyz
