= JCW World Tag Team Championship =

Professional wrestling tag team championship

Details
- Promotion: Juggalo Championship Wrestling
- Date established: December 19, 1999
- Current champions: Luciano Family (Vincenzo and Sally Boy)
- Date won: October 31, 2026 (aired November 12, 2026)

Other names
- JCW Tag Team Championship (1999–2025); JCW World Tag Team Championship (2025–present)
Statistics
- Most reigns: The Ring Rydas (Ring Ryda Blue and Ring Ryda Red) (5 reigns)
- Longest reign: Insane Clown Posse (Shaggy 2 Dope and Violent J) (2051 days)
- Shortest reign: (1 day): The Rainbow Coalition (Bob and Neil); Bang & Matthews (Davey Bang & August Matthews); Luciano Family Enterprises (Mickie Knuckles and PCO)
- Youngest champion: Crazy Mary Dobson (21 years, 164 days)
- Lightest champion: Mad Man Pondo and Crazy Mary Dobson (359 lb (163 kg) combined)

The JCW Tag Team Championship is a professional wrestling tag team championship created and promoted by Juggalo Championship Wrestling. The current champions are the Luciano Family (Vincenzo and Sally Boy), who are in their first recognized reign as a team and individually. They won the titles by defeating champions Choppa City (Atiba and Bruce Wayans), Juggalo World Order (2 Tuff Tony and Willie Mike), and The Boneheads (Rah and Ugh) in a four-way elimination match at Hallowicked 2026 on October 31, 2026 in Detroit, Michigan.

== Title history ==
Key
No.	Overall reign number
Reign	Reign number for the specific champion
Days	Number of days held
†	Championship change is unrecognized by the promotion

No.	Champion	Championship change			Reign statistics		Notes	Ref.
No.	Champion	Date	Event	Location	Reign	Days	Notes	Ref.
1	Insane Clown Posse (Shaggy 2 Dope and Violent J)	December 19, 1999	JCW Volume 1	Detroit, MI	1	573	Defeated The Doinks (Tarek the Great and Truth Martini) to become the inaugural champions.	
2	The Rainbow Coalition (Bob and Neil)	July 14, 2001	Gathering of the Juggalos	Toledo, OH	1	1		
3	Insane Clown Posse (Shaggy 2 Dope and Violent J)	July 15, 2001	Gathering of the Juggalos	Toledo, OH	2	2,051		
—	Vacated	February 25, 2007	—	—	—	—	The title was vacated when previous champions Insane Clown Posse (Shaggy 2 Dope and Violent J) had stopped defending the titles.	
4	Mad Man Pondo and Necro Butcher	August 11, 2007	Bloodymania	Cave-In-Rock, IL	1	168	Defeated The Bad Breed (Axl and Ian Rotten), The Basham Brothers (Danny and Doug), The Dream Team (Brutus Beefcake and Greg Valentine), The Headshrinkers (Alofa and Samu), The Pimp 'n' Gimp Connection (Zach Gowen and Human Tornado), Jorge and Tito Santana, and Team All Japan (Brute Issei and Akira Raijin) in an elimination match to win the vacant titles.	
†	2 Tuff Tony and Violent J	January 26, 2008	JCW	Cleveland, OH	1 (1, 3)		Breyer Wellington defended the titles on Necro Butcher's behalf. Their reign was voided and stricken from the record. Thus, the titles were vacated.	
5	The Bloody Brothers (Ian and Lane Bloody)	August 10, 2008	Bloodymania II	Cave-In-Rock, IL	1	132	Defeated Human Tornado and The Weedman to win the vacant titles.	
—	Vacated	December 20, 2008	—	—	—	—		
6	The Thomaselli Brothers (Pauly and Vito Thomaselli)	December 20, 2008	Big Ballas X-Mas Party '08	Pontiac, MI	1	232	Defeated The Bump-N-Uglies to win the vacant titles. The Thomaselli Brothers disguised themselves as The Ring Rydas.	
7	The Weedman and Billy Bong	August 9, 2009	Bloodymania III	Cave-In-Rock, IL	1	83		
8	The Thomaselli Brothers (Pauly and Vito Thomaselli)	October 31, 2009	Hallowicked After Party '09	Detroit, MI	2	288		
9	The Kings of Wrestling (Chris Hero and Claudio Castagnoli)	August 15, 2010	Bloodymania IV	Cave-In-Rock, IL	1	176	This four-way tag team match also featured The Ring Rydas (Ring Ryda Red and Ring Ryda Blue) and The Briscoe Brothers (Mark Briscoe and Jay Briscoe).	
—	Vacated	February 7, 2011	—	—	—	—	The titles were vacated after previous champions The Kings of Wrestling (Chris Hero and Claudio Castagnoli) failed to defend the titles within 90 days.	
10	The Haters (Pauly and Vito Thomaselli)	February 23, 2011	Flashlight Hysteria	Southgate, MI	3	14	Won an eight-team battle royal to win the vacant titles.	
11	Mad Man Pondo and Necro Butcher	March 9, 2011	Hardcore Hell	Southgate, MI	2	42	This was a Hardcore Barbed Wire, Thumbtacks, and Ladders match.	
12	The Ring Rydas (Ring Ryda Red and Ring Ryda Blue)	April 20, 2011	Up in Smoke	Southgate, MI	1	99		
13	Raven and Sexy Slim Goody	August 14, 2011	Bloodymania 5	Cave-In-Rock, IL	1	139	This was a four-way tag team match.	
14	The Ring Rydas (Ring Ryda Red and Ring Ryda Blue)	December 31, 2011	New Year's Eve Ninja Party!	Worcester, MA	2	862		
15	The Hooligans (Devin and Mason Cutter)	May 11, 2014	Road To The Gathering Tour; Day 7	Joliet, IL	1	76		
16	The Ring Rydas (Ring Ryda Red and Ring Ryda Blue)	July 26, 2014	Bloodymania 8	Thornville, OH	3	147	This was a Tables, Ladders, and Chairs match.	
17	The Hooligans (Devin and Mason Cutter)	December 20, 2014	Big Ballas	Detroit, MI	2	63		
18	Mad Man Pondo and Crazy Mary Dobson	February 21, 2015	Take Me Home Charity Show	Detroit, MI	1 (3,1)	155		
19	The Ring Rydas (Ring Ryda Red and Ring Ryda Blue)	July 26, 2015	Bloodymania 9	Thornville, OH	4	138		
20	Super Strong Tiger and The Spider Monkey	December 11, 2015	The Incredible Rassle Rap Charity Festival Tour; Day 2	Sauget, IL	1	224		
21	The Ring Rydas (Ring Ryda Red and Ring Ryda Blue)	July 22, 2016	BloodyMania 10	Thornville, OH	5		This fatal four-way Tables, Ladders, and Chairs match also featured The Viking War Party and The Hooligans.	
—	Vacated	N/A	—	—	—	—	The title was vacated because previous champions The Ring Rydas (Ring Ryda Red and Ring Ryda Blue) stopped defending the titles.	
22	Mosh Pit Mike and Chuey Martinez	July 20, 2018	Bloodymania 12	Thornville, OH	1	1,326	Defeated The Hooligans to win the vacant titles.	
23	The Brothers of Funstruction (Yabo the Clown and Ruffo the Clown)	March 7, 2022	Panic in Pontiac	Pontiac, MI	1	788		
24	The Southern 6 (Kerry Morton and James Storm)	May 3, 2024	Lunacy: The Juggalos Strike Back	Columbus, OH	1	51	Aired on tape delay on September 18, 2024.	
25	The Backseat Boyz (JP Grayson and Tommy Grayson)	June 23, 2024	Lunacy	Detroit, MI	1	128	Aired on tape delay on September 25, 2024.	
26	Bang & Matthews (Davey Bang and August Matthews)	October 29, 2024	Lunacy: Train of Terror Tour	Joliet, IL	1	1		
27	The Backseat Boyz (JP Grayson and Tommy Grayson)	October 30, 2024	Devil's Night	Detroit, MI	2	108		
28	Colby Corino and Shane Mercer	February 15, 2025	Lunacy: Juggalo Weekend	Worcester, MA	1	19	Aired on tape delay on March 20, 2025.	
—	Vacated	March 6, 2025	—	—	—	—	Corino and Mercer were stripped of the titles due to a lack of title defenses.	
29	The Brothers of Funstruction (Yabo the Clown and Ruffo the Clown)	March 8, 2025	Lunacy	Albuquerque, NM	2	159	Defeated The Backseat Boyz (JP Grayson and Tommy Grayson) in a tournament final to win the vacant titles. Aired on tape delay on April 10.	
30	YDNP (Alec Price and Jordan Oliver)	August 14, 2025	JCW vs. GCW: The 2 Day War; Night 1	Thornville, OH	1	29	This was a Winners Take All match where YDNP's GCW World Tag Team Championship was also on the line.	
31	The Brothers of Funstruction (Yabo the Clown and Ruffo the Clown)	September 12, 2025	GCW Evil Deeds	Detroit, MI	3	49	This was a Game Changer Wrestling event. This was a Riddlebox Winners Take All match, where the GCW World Tag Team Championship was also on the line.	
32	The Outbreak (Abel Booker and Jacksyn Crowley)	October 31, 2025	Lunacy: Hallowicked	Detroit, MI	1	22		
33	The Brothers of Funstruction (Yabo the Clown and Ruffo the Clown)	November 22, 2025	Lunacy	Detroit, MI	4	90	Aired on tape delay on January 8, 2026.	
†	Juggalo World Order (2 Tuff Tony and Willie Mack)	February 20, 2026	Lunacy	Saginaw, MI	1		Juggalo World Order won due to outside interference by Big Vito. Then, they refused to accept their title win and returned the titles to The Brothers of Funstruction (Yabo the Clown and Ruffo the Clown). Aired on tape delay on February 26, 2026.	
34	Luciano Family Enterprises (Mickie Knuckles and PCO)	February 20, 2026	Lunacy	Saginaw, MI	1	1	Aired on tape delay on March 5.	
35	Juggalo World Order (2 Tuff Tony and Willie Mack)	February 21, 2026	Lunacy	Detroit, MI	2	118	Aired on tape delay on March 12.	
36	Choppa City (Atiba and Bruce Wayans)	June 19, 2026	Lunacy: Gorilla Monsoon June	Detroit, MI	1	134	Aired on tape delay on July 2.	
37	Luciano Family (Vincenzo and Sally Boy)	October 31, 2026	Lunacy: Hallowicked 2026	Detroit, MI	1	22+	Aired on tape delay on November 12.	

== Combined reigns ==
As of November 22, 2026.

†	Indicates the current champion

=== By team ===
Rank	Team	No. of reigns	Combined days
1.	Insane Clown Posse (Shaggy 2 Dope and Violent J)	2	2624
2.	The Ring Rydas (Ring Ryda Blue and Red)	5	≥1457
3.	Mosh Pit Mike and Chuey Martinez	1	1326
4.	The Brothers of Funstruction (Yabo The Clown and Ruffo The Clown)	4	1088
5.	The Thomaselli Brothers / The Haters (Pauly and Vito Thomaselli)	3	534
6.	The Backseat Boyz (JP Grayson and Tommy Grayson)	2	237
7.	Mad Man Pondo and Necro Butcher	2	210
8.	The Hooligans (Devin and Mason Cutter)	2	203
9.	The Kings of Wrestling (Chris Hero and Claudio Castagnoli)	1	176
10.	Mad Man Pondo and Crazy Mary Dobson	1	155
11.	Raven and Sexy Slim Goody	1	139
12.	Choppa City (Atiba and Bruce Wayans)	1	134
13.	The Bloody Brothers (Ian and Lane Bloody)	1	132
14.	Juggalo World Order (2 Tuff Tony and Willie Mack)	1	118
15.	The Weedman and Billy Bong	1	83
16.	The Southern 6 (Kerry Morton and James Storm)	1	51
17.	YDNP (Alec Price and Jordan Oliver)	1	29
18.	The Outbreak (Abel Booker and Jacksyn Crowley)	1	22
19.	Luciano Family † (Vincenzo and Sally Boy)	1	22+
20.	Colby Corino and Shane Mercer	1	19
21.	Bang & Matthews (Davey Bang & August Matthews)	1	1
21.	The Rainbow Coalition (Bob and Neil)	1	1
21.	Luciano Family Enterprises (Mickie Knuckles and PCO)	1	1

=== By wrestler ===
Rank	Wrestler	No. of reigns	Combined days
1.	Shaggy 2 Dope	2	2624
1.	Violent J	2	2624
3.	Ring Ryda Blue	5	≥1457
3.	Ring Ryda Red	5	≥1457
5.	Mosh Pit Mike	1	1326
5.	Chuey Martinez	1	1326
7.	Yabo The Clown	4	1088
7.	Ruffo The Clown	4	1088
9.	Pauly Tomaselli	1	534
9.	Vito Tomaselli	1	534
10.	Mad Man Pondo	3	365
12.	JP Grayson	2	237
12.	Tommy Grayson	2	237
14.	Super Strong Tiger	1	224
14.	The Spider Monkey	1	224
15.	Necro Butcher	2	210
17.	Chris Hero	1	176
17.	Claudio Castagnoli	1	176
18.	Crazy Mary Dobson	1	155
20.	Raven	1	139
20.	Sexy Slim Goody	1	139
22.	Atiba	1	134
22.	Bruce Wayans	1	134
24.	Ian Bloody	1	132
24.	Lane Bloody	1	132
26.	2 Tuff Tony	1	118
26.	Willie Mack	1	118
28.	The Weedman	2	83
28.	Billy Bong	2	83
30.	Devin Cutter	2	76
30.	Mason Cutter	2	76
32.	Kerry Morton	1	51
32.	James Storm	1	51
34.	Alec Price	1	29
34.	Jordan Oliver	1	29
36.	Jacksyn Crowley	1	22
36.	Abel Booker	1	22
38.	Vincenzo †	1	22+
38.	Sally Boy †	1	22+
40.	Colby Corino	1	19
40.	Shane Mercer	1	19
42.	August Matthews	1	1
42.	Davey Bang	1	1
42.	Bob	1	1
42.	Neil	1	1
42.	Mickie Knuckles	1	1
42.	PCO	1	1

== See also ==
- JCW World Heavyweight Championship
