= JP Grayson =

American professional wrestler

- Grayson in July 2026 with the PWU Tag Team Championship

Personal information
- Born: September 7, 1996 (age 30) Rockland County, New York, U.S.

Professional wrestling career
- Ring names: JP Grayson; Justin Parker; JP Daily; Devin Justin
- Trained by: Gino Caruso (East Coast Pro Wrestling); Kodiak Bear (East Coast Pro Wrestling); Dan Maff (Create A Pro Wrestling); Mario Bokara (Create A Pro Wrestling); Pat Buck (Create A Pro Wrestling); Danny Cage
- Debut: 2014

Justin Parker DuBoff, better known by his ring names JP Grayson, Justin Parker, JP Daily and Devin Justin is an American professional wrestler and promoter.

He is best known for his work in Combat Zone Wrestling (CZW), WrestlePro he was the WrestlePro Tag Team Champion and the WrestlePro Alaska Tag Team Champion with Tommy Grayson as the Amazing Graysons, Juggalo Championship Wrestling where he was a two-time JCW Tag Team Champion with Tommy Grayson, Game Changer Wrestling (GCW), and Super Powers of Wrestling (SPO) and its sister Pro Wrestling Unplugged (PWU) where he is 1/2 of the PWU World Tag Team Champions with Tommy Grayson as Backseat Boyz, a former SPO Tag Team Champion with Tommy Grayson, PWU Legacy Champion, and a former PWU World Champion along with serving as a part-owner of both promotions. He has also worked with All Elite Wrestling (AEW), Ring of Honor (ROH), World Wrestling Entertainment (WWE), House of Glory (HOG), Memphis Wrestling, and the United Wrestling Network (UWN).

== Professional wrestling career ==
=== Independent circuit (2014–present) ===
On January 25, 2023, it was announced that the Graysons would be bestowed the Backseat Boyz tag team name by former Backseat Boyz member Johnny Kashmere. JP and Tommy Grayson debuted the gimmick on March 18, 2023, at ESW's Tough Luck A passing-of-the-torch ceremony was held during Wrestling Is Now's Big Fight on March 31, 2023, which featured Johnny Kashmere.

=== Game Changer Wrestling (2019–present) ===
On July 14, 2019, JP and Tommy Grayson made their Game Changer Wrestling debuts during 5150 – A Tribute To Homicide in a battle royal. They were both simultaneously eliminated by Bull James[5]

On January 21, 2025, at The People vs. GCW in New York City, the JP Grayson entered a pre-show rumble alongside his tag team partner Tommy Grayson and JCW American Champion 2 Tuff Tony who were both accompanied by Juggalo Championship Wrestling owner Violent J. During Amerikaz Most Wanted, JP Grayson and Tommy Grayson teamed up with The Wraith to take on Dani Mo and the Brothers of Funstruction (Yabo The Clown and Ruffo The Clown) in a JCW exhibition six man tag team match.

on March 30, 2025, a JCW exhibition six man tag team match between the Backseat Boyz and The Wraith against Dani Mo and the Brothers of Funstruction (Yabo The Clown and Ruffo The Clown) took place on GCW's Amerikaz Most Wanted in Sauget, Illinois which featured Violent J on commentary.

On April 20, 2025, during the Joey Janela's Spring Break: Clusterf**k Forever, JP and Tommy Grayson teamed up with Mickie Knuckles, 2 Tuff Tony, the Brothers of Funstruction (Yabo The Clown and Ruffo The Clown), and Dani Mo to enter into the Clusterf**k Battle Royal representing JCW in which they had taken control of the ring for a brief period before Matt Tremont, Bam Sullivan, Big Joe, Lou Nixon, Dr. Redacted, and John Wayne Murdoch entered as Team GCW. The two teams proceeded to brawl backstage during the match.

On July 4, 2025, during GCW's Backyard Wrestling 7, JP Grayson's partner, Tommy Grayson, suffered an ankle injury during a match against YDNP (Alec Price and Jordan Oliver), forcing him to be sidelined from wrestling until March 6, 2026. He was replaced on the cards for upcoming shows including GCW x JCW Showcase Showdown: The Violence is Right, JCW Powder Keg, and JCW vs. GCW: The 2 Day War.

=== World Wrestling Entertainment / WWE (2019) ===
JP Grayson made his WWE debut on the July 8, 2019 episode of Monday Night Raw at the Prudential Center in Newark, New Jersey where he teamed up with Colin Justin to take on the Viking Raiders (Ivar and Erik). The following night, Grayson competed in his second and final WWE match on 205 Live against Jack Gallagher.

=== All Elite Wrestling and Ring of Honor (2021, 2025) ===
On June 4, 2021, JP and Tommy Grayson made their All Elite Wrestling (AEW) debut during a taping for the June 8, 2021 episode of AEW Dark at Daily's Place in Jacksonville, Florida where they fought the Chaos Project (Luther and Serpentico). On November 15, 2025, JP Grayson made his Ring of Honor (ROH) debut when he competed in a singles match against Satnam Singh during a taping for the November 20, 2025 episode of Ring of Honor Wrestling.

=== Combat Zone Wrestling (2021–2024) ===
On December 19, 2021, JP Grayson and Tommy Grayson made their Combat Zone Wrestling debut at The Fight Within in a tag team match against Prolific (Isaiah Wolf and Marcus Marquee).

During CZW's 25th anniversary show on February 4, 2024, the Backseat Boyz challenged Milk Chocolate (Brandon Watts and Randy Summers) for the CZW Tag Team Championship.

=== Juggalo Championship Wrestling (2024–present) ===
On June 22, 2024, JP and Tommy Grayson made their Juggalo Championship Wrestling debut as the Backseat Boyz at a taping for JCW Lunacy at the Harpos Concert Theatre in Detroit, Michigan when they won the JCW Tag Team Championship after defeating the Southern Six (Kerry Morton and James Storm). This match aired on the September 25, 2024 episode of JCW Lunacy. On the October 9, 2024 episode of JCW Lunacy, JP and Tommy Grayson teamed up with their manager and original Backseat Boyz member Johnny Kashmere in a six-man tag team match against Kongo Kong and the Redwood Giants (Hurtful Kurt and Painful Paul).

Due to Tommy Grayson suffering an ankle injury at Game Changer Wrestling's Backyard Wrestling 7, JP Grayson teamed up in several six man tag team matches with Colby Corino, Alice Crowley, Anthony Greene, and Shane Mercer. JP Grayson also took part in a 20-man battle riot during JCW vs. GCW: The 2 Day War on August 15, 2025, at Legend Valley in Thornville, Ohio.

On April 18, 2026, the Backseat Boyz made their return to JCW during the Strangle-Mania: Viva Las Violence pay-per-view at Horseshoe Las Vegas in Paradise, Nevada in a three way "freak show" tag team match against The Outbreak (Jacksyn Crowley and Abel Booker) and the Brothers of Funstruction (Yabo The Clown and Ruffo The Clown).

== Championships and accomplishments ==
- Battlefield Pro Wrestling
  - BPW Tag Team Championship (1 time) Current – with Tommy Grayson as the Backseat Boyz
- Pro Wrestling Magic
  - PWM Tag Team Championship (1 time) – with Tommy Grayson as the Amazing Graysons
- East Coast Pro Wrestling
  - ECPW Tag Team Championship (1 time) – with Tommy Grayson as the Amazing Graysons
- WrestlePro
  - WrestlePro Tag Team Championship (1 time) – with Tommy Grayson as the Amazing Graysons
  - WrestlePro Alaska Tag Team Championship (1 time) – with Tommy Grayson as the Amazing Graysons
- Xcite Wrestling
  - Xcite Tag Team Championship (1 time) – with Tommy Grayson as the NÜ BackSeatz
- Wrestling Is Now
  - WIN Tag Team Championship (2 times) – with Tommy Grayson as the NÜ BackSeatz
- SuperKrazee Pro Wrestling
  - SKPW Tag Team Championship (1 time) – with Tommy Grayson as the Backseat Boyz
- Super Powers of Wrestling / Pro Wrestling Unplugged
  - SPO Tag Team Championship (2 times) (1 time) – with Tommy Grayson as the Backseat Boyz
  - PWU Tag Team Championship (1 time) Current – with Tommy Grayson as the Backseat Boyz
  - PWU World Championship (1 time)
  - PWU Legacy Championship (1 time)
- Juggalo Championship Wrestling
  - JCW Tag Team Championship (3 times) – with Tommy Grayson as the Backseat Boyz
- For Us Wrestling
  - FUW Trios Championship (1 time) – with Tommy Grayson and Johnny Kashmere as the Backseat Boyz
