= Jimmy Lloyd (wrestler) =

American professional wrestler

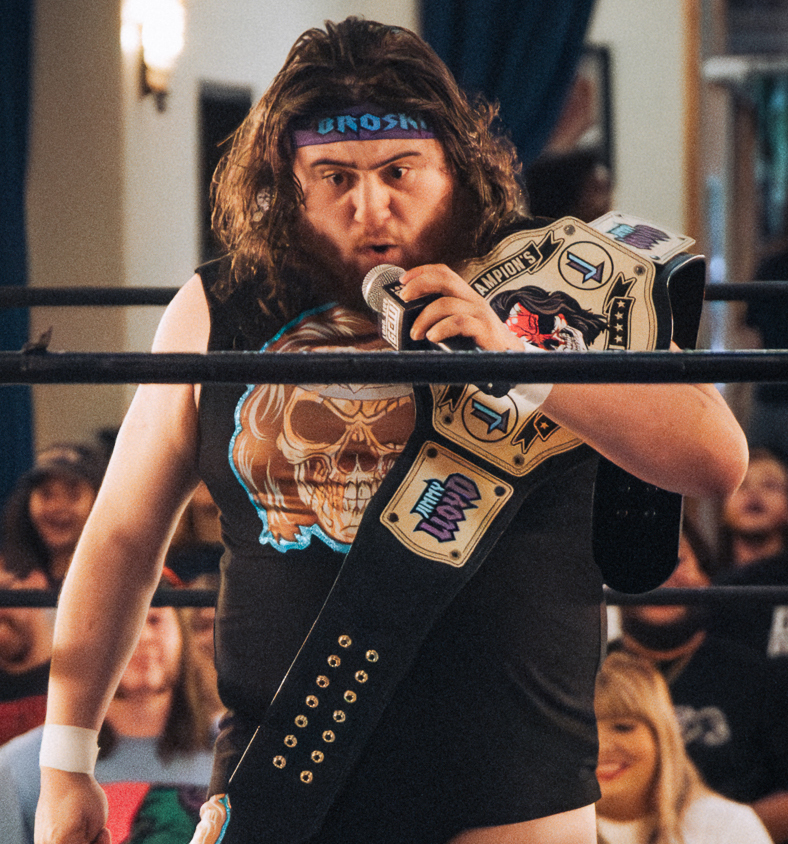
- Lloyd in June 2024

Personal information
- Born: James Marchese; February 17, 1998 (age 28) Philadelphia, Pennsylvania, United States

Professional wrestling career
- Ring name: Broski Jimmy "Broski" Jimmy Lloyd Jimmy Lloyd Lloyd Jameson Emanon
- Billed height: 5 ft 10 in (178 cm)
- Billed weight: 220 lb (100 kg)
- Trained by: Jim Molineaux; Drew Gulak; Homicide
- Debut: 2014

James Marchese (born February 17, 1998), better known by his ring name Jimmy Lloyd, is an American professional wrestler. He is currently performing as a freelancer – predominantly for Game Changer Wrestling (GCW). He is best known for his appearances in Combat Zone Wrestling (CZW) and Major League Wrestling (MLW).

== Professional wrestling career ==
=== American independent circuit (2014–present) ===
==== Early career and Combat Zone Wrestling (2014–2020) ====
Marchese made his professional wrestling debut at OTW Sole Survivor, an event promoted by Old Time Wrestling on May 14, 2014, where he alongside Steve Sanders where they won the OTW Tag Team champions as they defeated Mean Streak (Eddie Hawkins and Justin Pusser).

Marchese shared a five-year tenure with Combat Zone Wrestling. He made his debut in the promotion at MBA/CZW Memory Remains on October 25, 2015, where he fell short to Steve Sanders in singles competition.

During his time with the promotion, Marchese competed in various signature events. At CZW Cage of Death, he made his debut at the edition number 18 from December 10, 2016, where he competed in a Six-man Scramble match won by Dave Crist and also involving A. R. Fox, Tony Deppen, Zachary Wentz, Tim Donst and Alexander James. At Cage of Death 19 on December 9, 2017, he fell short to Matt Tremont in single competition. At Cage of Death XX on December 9, 2018, at the ECW Arena, he teamed up with Maria Manic, Dan O'Hare and Mitch Vallen in a losing effort against The Office (Kasey Catal, Conor Claxton, Brandon Kirk and Kit Osbourne) as a result of an Intergender Hardcore Match. He also competed at the last event of its kind, the Cage of Death XXI from December 14, 2019, where he defeated Brandon Kirk in a Cage Of Death Match in the main event.

As for the CZW Tournament of Death, he debuted at Tournament of Death 17 of June 9, 2018, edition which he won by defeating Casanova Valentine, Shlak, Stockade and G-Raver in a Blocks, Bats and Bundles Elimination Death Match in the first rounds, Mance Warner in the semifinals and Rickey Shane Page in the finals.

=== Game Changer Wrestling (2016–present) ===
Marchese is best known for his tenure with Game Changer Wrestling. He made his debut in the promotion at GCW Bloodlust on September on September 18, 2016, where he fell short to Nate Hatred in singles competition.

Marchese competed in various of the promotion's signature events. He started with the Joey Janela's Spring Break series of events in which he made his debut at the first-ever edition from March 30, 2017, where he competed in a later became traditional Clusterfuck Battle Royal, bout won by himself which also involved Arik Cannon, Bryan Idol, Crazy Boy, Dink, Facade, Flip Gordon, Glacier, Jervis Cottonbelly, John Silver, The Invisible Man and Veda Scott. He marked his latest appearance in the traditional bout at Joey Janela's Spring Break: Clusterfuck Forever on April 7, 2024, match won by Microman and also involving various other notable opponents, both male and female such as Mike Bailey, Alex Zayne, Aja Kong, Mercedes Martinez, Justin Credible, Tommy Dreamer, Dark Sheik, Parrow and many others.

As for the Jersey J-Cup, he has only competed outside of the tournament in filler bouts. He made his first appearance at the 2023 edition where he teamed up with "Different Youth" tag team partner Marcus Mathers in a losing effort against The S.A.T. (Joel Maximo and Jose Maximo), and Alec Price and Dante Leon and Brat Pack (Billie Starkz and Starboy Charlie) as a result of a four-way tag team match. At the 2024 edition, he teamed up with Charles Mason, Griffin McCoy, Jack Cartwheel, Kerry Morton and Tony Deppen in a losing effort against Mr. Danger, Man Like DeReiss, Allie Katch, Cole Radrick and Los Macizos (Ciclope and Miedo Extremo) as a result of a Twelve-person mixed tag team match.

At The Wrld on GCW on January 23, 2022, Marchese competed in a Grab the Brass Ring Ladder match for a match of the winner's choosing at any time, bout won by AJ Gray and also involving PCO, Alex Colon, G-Raver, Tony Deppen and Jordan Oliver. At GCW Fight Club, he competed on both nights of the event from October 8 and 9. On the first night, he competed in a Six-man Scramble match won by Lio Rush and also involving Blake Christian, Gringo Loco, Shane Mercer, and B-Boy. On the second night, he teamed up with his "Wasted Youth" stablemates Dyln McKay and Marcus Mathers in a losing effort against Second Gear Crew (1 Called Manders, Mance Warner, and Matthew Justice).

During his time in the promotion, Marchese chased for various championships. He won his first title, the GCW Tag Team Championship by teaming up with G-Raver at Zona 23 vs. GCW on July 18, 2021, to defeat Los Macizos (Ciclope and Miedo Extremo). At Cage of Survival 3 on June 2, 2024, he competed in a Gauntlet of Survival match which originally involved John Wayne Murdoch, Kasey Catal, 1 Called Manders, Microman, Shane Mercer, Jordan Oliver, and Charles Mason. Lloyd was later added to the bout by GCW General Manager Matt Cardona and won the title by defeating Nick Gage who was also added at a later point. Marchese then lost the title minutes later to Joey Janela who last eliminated him to win the match and become sole champion. At GCW Til Infinity 2022 on December 31, he competed for a title sanctioned by NWA, the NWA World Junior Heavyweight Championship for which he unsuccessfully challenged Kerry Morton.

=== Major League Wrestling (2023–2024) ===
In Major League Wrestling, Marchese made his debut at Battle Riot V on April 8, 2023 (aired April 25), where he competed in the traditional 40-man Battle Riot match for a future MLW World Heavyweight Championship match, bout won by Alex Kane by last eliminating Davey Boy Smith Jr. Marchese was himself eliminated by Raven. He continued making sporadic appearances in the promotion. At MLW Fusion #184 on September 3, 2023, he unsuccessfully challenged Akira for the MLW World Middleweight Championship. At One Shot on December 7, 2023, he unsuccessfully challenged Rickey Shane Page for the MLW National Openweight Championship. On the second night of the War Chamber 2024, Marchese teamed up with "Death Fighters" stablemates Akira, Raven and Jake Crist to defeat The Calling (Rickey Shane Page, Sami Callihan, Cannonball, and Dr. Cornwallis) in the traditional War Chamber match.

== Championships and accomplishments ==
- Combat Zone Wrestling
  - CZW Tournament of Death 17 (2018)
- Game Changer Wrestling
  - GCW Tag Team Championship (1 time) - with G-Raver
  - Clusterfuck Battle Royal (2017, inaugural)
- DDT Pro-Wrestling
  - Ironman Heavymetalweight Championship (1 time)
- Hardcore Hustle Organization
  - H2O Hybrid Championship (1 time)
- Horror Slam Wrestling
  - Murder City Death Match Cup (2022, inaugural)
- Pilger Ruh Pro Wrestling
  - Fightertainment Spectacle Tournament (2023)
  - Tournament Of Breath (2024)
- Pro Wrestling Illustrated
  - Ranked No. 258 of the top 500 singles wrestlers in the PWI 500 of 2021
