= John Wayne Murdoch =

American professional wrestler (born 1988)

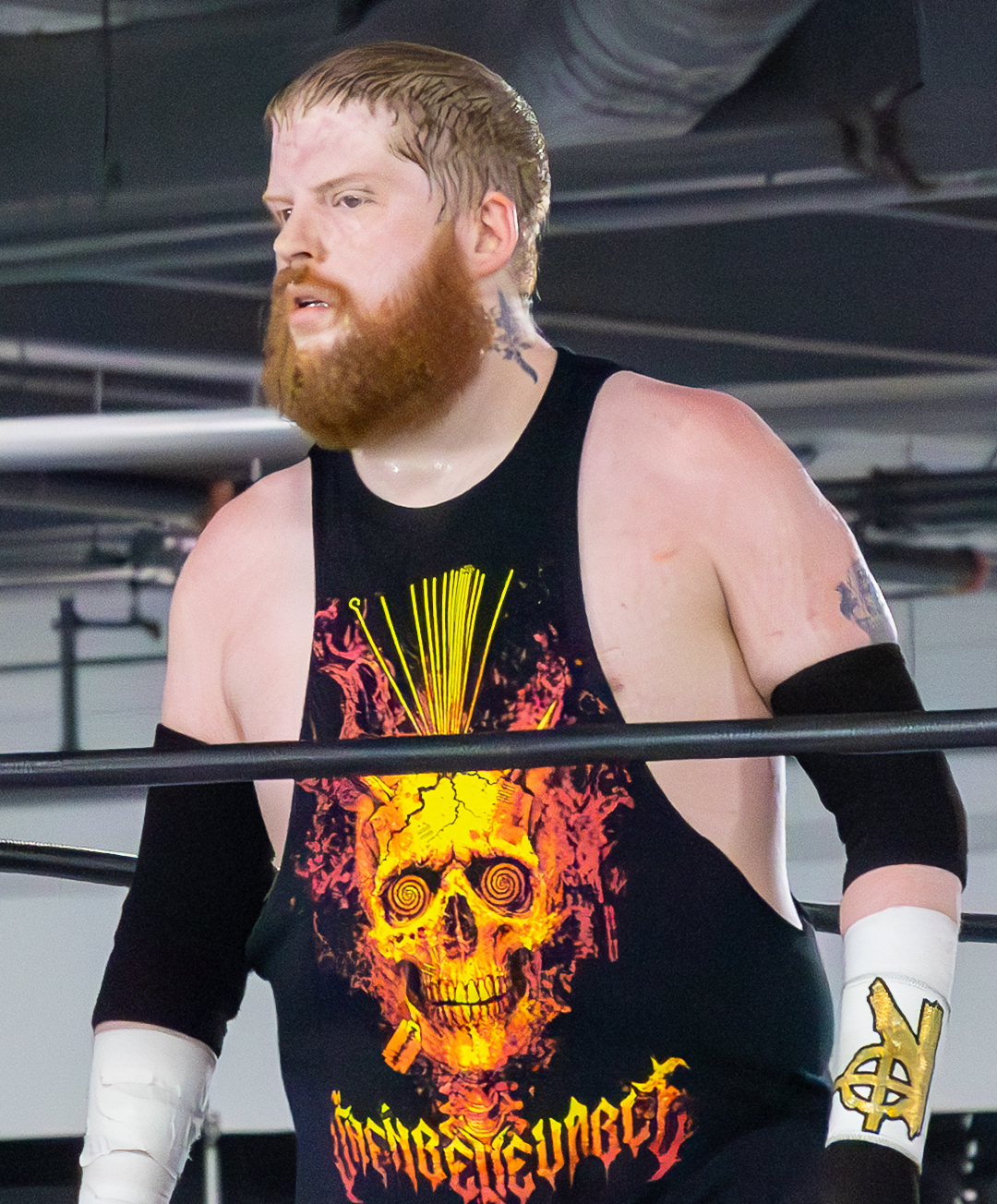
- Murdoch in June 2025

Personal information
- Born: August 20, 1988 (age 38) Murfreesboro, Tennessee

Professional wrestling career
- Ring name(s): Damien; Damien Payne; John Wayne Murdoch
- Billed height: 1.78 m (5 ft 10 in)
- Billed weight: 220 lb (100 kg)
- Trained by: Tony Falk
- Debut: 2003

John Wayne Murdoch (born August 20, 1988) is an American professional wrestler. He currently performs on the independent circuit, predominantly for ICW No Holds Barred, where he is a former two-time ICW American Deathmatch Champion.

== Professional wrestling career ==
=== Independent circuit (2003–present) ===
Murdoch wrestled most of his career in hardcore matches, sticking to the gimmick of an extreme wrestler. He competed in the CZW Tournament of Death 18 of Combat Zone Wrestling, where he got defeated by Jimmy Lloyd in a Shattered Dreams Panes Of Glass Death Match on June 22, 2019. He also competed in the CZW Tournament of Death 16, where he fell short to Jimmy Havoc and Rickey Shane Page in a Pain in the Glass Match of a first-round on June 10, 2017. At CZW Down With The Sickness 2016 on September 10, Murdoch competed in an eight-man tag team match where he teamed up with Dale Patricks, Reed Bentley and Josh Crane as Team IWA Mid-South, falling short to The Nation Of Intoxication (Conor Claxton, Danny Havoc, Devon Moore and Lucky 13). Murdoch also competed for Full Impact Pro (FIP), making two appearances at FIP Fallout 2015 Tag Team Tournament, one of them on October 23, where he teamed up with Reed Bentley and Trik Davis to defeat Team Outlaw Wrestling (Bull Bronson, Devin Cutter and Mason Cutter) in a six-man tag team match of a first-round, and on October 24, teaming up with the same partners, falling short to The Viking War Party (Frank Wyatt, The American Viking and The Little Viking) in a second-round match. At Blackcraft No Apologies, an event promoted by Blackcraft Wrestling on April 5, 2019, Mudroch participated in a 28-man battle royal where he competed against other superstars such as the winner Zicky Dice, Mance Warner, Swoggle and former ECW wrestler Justin Credible.

On August 1, 2025, Murdoch competed in a six man tag team death match on Juggalo Championship Wrestling's (JCW) Powder Keg pay-per-view where he would team up with 1 Called Manders and Matt Tremont against the JCW hall of famers 2 Tuff Tony, Mad Man Pondo, and Mickie Knuckles. At the end of the match, Murdoch had been set on fire after being suplexed through a burning table by Pondo. However, the stunt had resulted in Murdoch being rushed to the hospital after the show. He would make his return to pro wrestling 3 weeks later at GCW's Homecoming Weekend 2025 on August 23, 2025.

=== IWA Mid-South (2008–2021) ===
Murdoch is known for his long-time tenure with IWA Mid-South, where he won the IWA Mid-South Heavyweight Championship for the first time at the promotion's 19th Anniversary Show from October 9, 2015, by defeating Shane Mercer. At IWA Mid-South A Labor Of Love on August 31, 2018, Murdoch fell short to Aaron Williams and Michael Elgin in a three-way match for the IWA Mid-South Heavyweight Championship. He competed at IWTV Family Reunion 2021 Part 1 event from April 8, 2021, where he defeated Jake Crist to win the IWA Mid-South Heavyweight Championship for the sixth time. However, he later vacated the title on April 15, at IWA Mid-South Spring Fever 2021, after he won the IWA Mid-South Tag Team Championship by teaming up with Jake Crist, with whom he was in a feud and defeating The PD Express (Logan James and Tyler Matrix).

== Championships and accomplishments ==
- Evolution Pro Wrestling
  - EPW Openweight Championship (1 time)
  - Death Match Tournament (2014)
- Game Changer Wrestling
  - GCW Ultraviolent Championship (1 time)
  - GCW Tag Team Championship (2 times) - with Reed Bentley (1) and Alex Colon (1)
  - GCW Nick Gage Invitational 7 Tournament (2022)
  - GCW Tournament Of Survival 9 (2024)
- Horror Slam Wrestling
  - Horror Slam Deathmatch Championship (1 time)
  - Horror Slam Heavyweight Championship (1 time)
- ICW No Holds Barred
  - ICW American Deathmatch Championship (2 time)
- IWA Mid-South
  - IWA Mid-South Heavyweight Championship (6 times)
  - IWA Mid-South Tag Team Championship (2 times) - with Reed Bentley (1) and Jake Crist (1)
  - King Of The Death Matches Tournament (2016)
  - Vic Philpott Memorial Hybrid Cup (2021)
- Coliseum Championship Wrestling
  - King Of The Coliseum Tournament (2015)
- Naptown All Pro
  - Midwest Territory Championship (1 time)
- National Wrestling Alliance
  - NWA Mid-America Tag Team Championship (2 times) - with Dante
- Paradigm Pro Wrestling
  - PPW Tag Team Championship (2 times) - with Reed Bentley
- Primos Pro Wrestling
  - Slave to the Deathmatch 12 (2021)
- Pro Wrestling Illustrated
  - Ranked No. 160 of the top 500 singles wrestlers in the PWI 500 in 2023
- Pro Wrestling Trainwreck
  - Southern Sickness Cup (2021)
- United States Wrestling Organization
  - USWO Heavyweight Championship (2 times)
  - USWO Light Heavyweight Championship (1 time)
  - USWO Music City Championship (3 times)
  - USWO Tag Team Championship (6 times) - with LT Falk (1), The New York Gangster (1) and Josh Crow (4)
- Unsanctioned Pro
  - Unsanctioned Pro Hardcore Championship (1 time)
  - Unsanctioned Pro Tag Team Championship (1 time) - with Reed Bentley
- Xtreme Championship Federation
  - XCF Destroyer Championship (1 time, current)
  - XCF Tag Team Championship (1 time, current, inaugural) – with Reed Bentley
  - XCF Tag Team Title Tournament (2024) – with Reed Bentley
- Vicious Outcast Wrestling
  - VOW Anarchy Championship (1 time)
- Other Accomplishments
  - Underground Uprising Tournament (2015)
