= Sauget, Illinois =

Sauget
- Village
- Location of Sauget in Clair County, Illinois.
- Coordinates: 38°34′12″N 90°08′25″W
- Country: United States
- State: Illinois
- County: St. Clair

Area
  - Total: 4.94 sq mi (12.79 km^{2})
  - Land: 4.58 sq mi (11.87 km^{2})
  - Water: 0.36 sq mi (0.92 km^{2})
- Elevation: 410 ft (120 m)

Population (2020)
  - Total: 141
  - Density: 30.8/sq mi (11.88/km^{2})
- Time zone: UTC-6 (CST)
  - Summer (DST): UTC-5 (CDT)
- ZIP codes: 62201 / 62206
- Area code: 618
- FIPS code: 17-67756
- GNIS feature ID: 2399187

Sauget (/sɔːˈʒeɪ/ saw-ZHAY) is a village in St. Clair County, Illinois, United States. It is part of Greater St. Louis. The population was 141 at the 2020 census, down from 159 in 2010.

== History ==
Sauget was incorporated as "Monsanto" in 1926. It was formed to provide a lighter regulatory environment and low taxes for Monsanto chemical plants at a time when local jurisdictions had most of the responsibility for environmental rules. It was renamed in honor of Leo Sauget, its first Village President.

The village was incorporated in part in response to the failure of government in adjacent East St. Louis, Illinois to deliver essential services, and in part to take advantage of federal grant funding programs available only to governmental units, as opposed to private industry.

The village of Sauget operates the American Bottoms Treatment Plant, a large sewage treatment plant that serves much of the Illinois side of the St. Louis metropolitan area. In addition, the village operates a municipal physical/chemical treatment plant that receives industrial wastewater from its factories. This has been cited as one of only three municipal treatment plants of this type in the United States.

The Monsanto plant in Sauget was the nation's largest producer of PCBs before a 1977 ban, and the EPA has designated the plant site along Dead Creek as a Superfund site.

Sauget has its own 16-member fire department and 16-member police department; this is despite having a population below 250 people. There is roughly one officer and firefighter for every 15 residents in Sauget. Sauget supplies municipal water and wastewater services.

Sauget is also home to minor league baseball: the Gateway Grizzlies of the Frontier League, which are controlled by the Sauget family.

Located in Sauget is the National Building Arts Center, a historic preservationist and salvage organization which holds one of the largest collections of significant architectural and industrial elements in the US.

== Geography ==
According to the 2010 census, Sauget has a total area of 4.594 square miles (11.90 km^{2}), of which 4.23 square miles (10.96 km^{2}) (or 92.08%) is land and 0.364 square miles (0.94 km^{2}) (or 7.92%) is water.

Sauget is located in the American Bottom, the floodplain of the Mississippi River opposite St. Louis, Missouri.

== Demographics ==
Historical population
Census	Pop.	Note	%±
1930	304		—
1940	359		18.1%
1950	357		−0.6%
1960	324		−9.2%
1970	220		−32.1%
1980	205		−6.8%
1990	197		−3.9%
2000	249		26.4%
2010	159		−36.1%
2020	141		−11.3%

As of the census of 2000, there were 249 people, 101 households, and 61 families residing in the village. The population density was 60.3 inhabitants per square mile (23.3/km^{2}). There were 115 housing units at an average density of 27.8 per square mile (10.7/km^{2}). The racial makeup of the village was 70.28% White, 27.71% African American, 1.20% Asian, 0.40% from other races, and 0.40% from two or more races. Hispanic or Latino of any race were 0.80% of the population.

There were 101 households, out of which 27.7% had children under the age of 18 living with them, 36.6% were married couples living together, 21.8% had a female householder with no husband present, and 39.6% were non-families. 30.7% of all households were made up of individuals, and 10.9% had someone living alone who was 65 years of age or older. The average household size was 2.47 and the average family size was 3.05.

In the village, the population was spread out, with 23.7% under the age of 18, 10.0% from 18 to 24, 32.5% from 25 to 44, 22.9% from 45 to 64, and 10.8% who were 65 years of age or older. The median age was 36 years. For every 100 females, there were 81.8 males. For every 100 females age 18 and over, there were 84.5 males.

The median income for a household in the village was $35,833, and the median income for a family was $41,875. Males had a median income of $40,833 versus $25,714 for females. The per capita income for the village was $19,330. About 20.0% of families and 17.3% of the population were below the poverty line, including 28.6% of those under the age of eighteen and 11.1% of those 65 or over.

== Education ==
Sauget is in the Cahokia Community Unit School District 187.
