= Mickie Knuckles =

American professional wrestler (born 1984)

- Knuckles in June 2025

Personal information
- Born: Mickie Lee Knuckles; May 16, 1984 (age 42) Clarksville, Indiana, U.S.

Professional wrestling career
- Ring name(s): Mickie Knuckles; Isabella Smothers; Izza Belle Smothers; Moose; Moose Knuckles
- Billed height: 5 ft 4 in (1.63 m)
- Billed weight: 185 lb (84 kg)
- Billed from: Clarksville, Indiana; The Right Side of Whiskey Row
- Trained by: Chris Hero
- Debut: August 2, 2003

Mickie Lee Knuckles (born May 16, 1984) is an American professional wrestler. She currently performs on the independent circuit, particularly for Juggalo Championship Wrestling (JCW), ICW No Holds Barred, and Asylum Wrestling Revolution (AWR). She is best known for her tenures with Independent Wrestling Association Mid-South, Chikara and Combat Zone Wrestling (CZW). She was also as well as a brief stint with Total Nonstop Action Wrestling (TNA) under the ring name Moose. Knuckles is also notable for her hard-hitting style and intergender deathmatches.She has the record of competing in the most deathmatch tournaments as a Woman with 60.

== Early life ==
Mickie Knuckles was born in the small southern city Clarksville, Indiana, on May 16, 1984. Knuckles graduated from Charlestown Senior High School.

== Professional wrestling career ==
Knuckles has been a fan of professional wrestling since she was five years old, and she started training to become a professional wrestler under Chris Hero, Mark Wolf and Bull Pain. During this time, she also worked as a referee and part of the security for Independent Wrestling Association Mid-South shows. Knuckles became the final graduating student of the IWA-MS Wrestling School, and would go on to wrestle various opponents including Amazing Kong and Too Cold Scorpio.

=== Independent Wrestling Association Mid-South (2003–2009) ===
Knuckles debuted on August 2, 2003, in a non-tournament match at the 2003 King of the Death Match against Hailey Hatred. During the match, Hatred powerbombed Knuckles across two bridged steel chairs. Knuckles' neck hit the back of the chairs, causing the match to be stopped. Undeterred, in November 2003, Knuckles was booked into the Ted Petty Invitational (TPI) tournament, becoming the first woman to be booked in either the IWA Mid-South Sweet Science Sixteen Tournament.

Knuckles continued to have inter-gender matches against wrestlers such as Cash Flo and Nate Webb, before Dave Prazak began to bring in more women to IWA Mid-South and their women's division was formed. In May 2004, a tournament was held to crown the first NWA Midwest/IWA Mid-South Women's Championship, during which Mickie advanced to the semi-finals before being defeated by Mercedes Martinez. One of her fellow entrants in the tournament, Traci Brooks, stated that she had "never seen a girl train as hard" as Mickie. Mickie won the NWA Midwest/IWA Mid-South Women's Championship on June 11, 2005, defeating MsChif and Allison Danger in a three-way match. However, six days later NWA Midwest promoter Ed Chuman declared that the title match had been unsanctioned and returned NWA Midwest title to MsChif. Ian Rotten, however, still recognized Mickie as the IWA Mid-South Women's Champion, leading to the titles splitting into two separate entities.

As such, Knuckles became the IWA Mid-South Women's Champion, keeping the title for five months before losing it to her first ever opponent Hailey Hatred, on November 18, 2005. Knuckles would win the title back at an IWA East Coast event in February 2006, and held on to it until July 2007 before losing it to Chuck Taylor. Mickie earned an IWA Mid-South Heavyweight Championship match against Chuck and he stated that if he had to put up his title against a female, than the female should also put her title on the line. Mickie agreed and was defeated by Chuck who then became the men's and women's champion. Less than a month later, Mickie won back her title by defeating Taylor in a "Falls Count Anywhere" match to regain the Women's Championship for a third time. She would go on to hold the title until May 2, 2008, where she lost to by Daizee Haze in a triple threat match also involving Sara Del Rey.

Before receiving a rematch for the IWA Women's Championship, Knuckles broke her right femur on July 6, 2008, after performing a diving crossbody off a platform onto Del Rey.

==== King of the Death Match Tournament ====
After losing on the first night in a Fans Bring the Weapons Match in the 2006 tournament, Knuckles once again was booked in the King of the Death Match Tournament in 2007, becoming the only woman to ever be booked for the show on multiple occasions.

On Night One, Knuckles defeated Tank in a Barbed Wire Ropes and Barbed Wire Baseball Bat Deathmatch. However, she was defeated on Night Two in the quarter finals by Brain Damage in another Fans Bring the Weapons Match.

==== Queen of the Death Match Tournament ====
At the inaugural Queen of the Death Match tournament in November 2006, an announcement was made to open the show that LuFisto would not be performing due to breaking her hand punching Necro Butcher during the finals of the Stranglehold KOTDM tournament show. In the first round, Knuckles defeated Ann Thraxx in an Unlucky 13 Staple Gun Death Match, and went on to defeat Rachel Putski in the semi-final in a Taipei Death Match. This put Mickie through to the final where she defeated Mayumi Ozaki in a No Rope Barbed Wire, Fans Bring The Weapons Steel Cage Death Match to become the first ever IWA Mid-South Queen of the Death Match. However, following the match, LuFisto and Vanessa Kraven entered the cage and beat Mickie down, leading to Mickie swearing revenge against LuFisto.

The second Queen of the Death Match tournament show was held in October, 2007 and this time LuFisto was able to make her booking. Mickie was beaten in a first round Barbed Wire Ropes and Barbed Wire Baseball Bat Deathmatch after being pinned by Storm. However, she was victorious in the Semi Final Losers Bracket, defeating B.B. Walls in a Barbed Wire Ropes and Deathmatch Bats match; following that with a victory over Roxie Cotton in a Barbed Wire Ropes and Taipei Death Match in the loser's bracket final. This set up the final fight of LuFisto vs Mickie Knuckles in a No Rope Barbed Wire and Electrified Light Tubes Death Match in which LuFisto defeated Mickie.

=== Chikara and Chickfight (2005, 2006) ===
In February 2005, Knuckles made her Chikara debut as Eddie Kingston's tag team partner for that year's Tag World Grand Prix. Later that year, she was booked in the Young Lions Cup tournament, becoming the first female wrestler to compete for the title. Knuckles made her final appearance with Chikara on June 25, 2006, where she lost to Daizee Haze.

In October 2005, Knuckles was booked in the Chickfight 3 tournament show in Hayward, California. After defeating Tiffany in the first round and Hailey Hatred in the second, Mickie lost out in the finals to returning champion Mariko Yoshida.

=== Total Nonstop Action Wrestling (2008) ===
In mid-2008, Knuckles made her debut with Total Nonstop Action Wrestling. She appeared on the June 5 edition of Impact!, coming to The Beautiful People's aid by attacking Gail Kim, ODB, and Roxxi. It was later announced that she would be in a tag match with The Beautiful People against the team of Kim, Roxxi, and ODB at Slammiversary. At the show, she made her in-ring debut under the name Moose, but lost the match when ODB pinned her.

After Slammiversary, Mickie signed an official contract with TNA and made her Impact! in-ring debut on the June 26 edition with a victory over ODB in a Bimbo Brawl. The following week, she defeated Roxxi in another Bimbo Brawl.

Later that week at an IWA-MS show, Knuckles broke her leg during a match against Sara Del Rey. In order to take time off to recover, TNA had reported they had a spot left open for Knuckles. However, after an unsuccessful first surgery, another surgery was needed and TNA decided to release her from her contract instead.

=== Juggalo Championship Wrestling (2008–2012) ===
Knuckles debuted in Juggalo Championship Wrestling as a referee in season two of the internet wrestling show SlamTV!. Tracy Smothers, who was facing his rival 2 Tuff Tony, won the match after a fast count by Knuckles, who was later revealed as Tracy's illegitimate daughter, Isabella Smothers. Two weeks later, Tracy caught Isabella listening to Boondox, the rapper who sings 2 Tuff Tony's entrance music. The following week, Tracy caught Isabella engaging in sexual actions with Boondox and assaulted him. Tracy and Isabella were later scheduled to face Boondox and 2 Tuff Tony at Bloodymania II. After Isabella broke her leg wrestling for IWA-MS, she was replaced in the match by Bull Pain.

Isabella defeated Hailey Hatred in a Ladies 10,000 Thumbtack Deathmatch at Juggalo Championship Wrestling's event Oddball Wrestling 2009. At Bloodymania IV, Isabella lost to "The World's Tallest Juggalette" Isis in the first women's match in Bloodymania history. By the end of 2010, she was put into a storyline in which she was seemingly dating Bull Pain. Smothers and Pain were then involved in a brief rivalry with the Weedman.

=== Ohio Valley Wrestling (2011) ===
Knuckles made her Ohio Valley Wrestling debut on episode 610, under the name Izza Belle Smothers. She teamed with her (storyline) sister Jessie Belle Smothers in a losing effort to The Blossoms. On episode 612, Smothers Twisted Daughters teamed with Shiloh Jonze in a six-person mixed tag team match in a losing effort to The Blossoms and Johnny Spade. Smothers was part of an eight-woman gauntlet match for the at OVW's Saturday Night Special on April 15, but was unsuccessful in winning the title. On July 7, Smothers Twisted Daughters defeated Taryn Shay and Lady JoJo when Izza Belle pinned JoJo, giving her an opportunity to challenge for the title. On August 6, at the Saturday Night Special, Smothers defeated JoJo to win the Women's Championship. On August 24, Smothers lost the title back to JoJo. On October 11, Knuckles was unsuccessful in reclaiming the Women's Championship during a three-way match against Lady JoJo and Taeler Hendrix. On December 10, Knuckles and Jessie Belle Smothers' OVW profiles were removed from the website, signalling their departure from the company.

=== Return to TNA (2016) ===
After giving birth to her son and marrying her husband, fellow wrestler Justin Turner (also known as Jacob Black), Knuckles made her return to wrestling in May 2016. Shortly after making her return she made a debut at TNA for a dark match against Laurel Van Ness.

=== Independent circuit, Return to IWA-MS, Hiatus, Return and Aunt Mickie (2012–2015, 2017–present) ===
In 2012, Knuckles wrestled only four times as she was due to give birth. Knuckles made her full-time return to wrestling on February 10, 2013, where she teamed with Ryan Dookie to win an eight-team Gauntlet Match to win the Pro Wrestling Freedom Tag Team Championship. Following this, Knuckles returned to Independent Wrestling Association Mid-South for the first time in four years, where she defeated Heidi Lovelace, Jordynne Grace, Randi West and Thunderkitty in a five-way match on December 6. After a few more matches with IWA-MS, Knuckles wrestled her final match for the promotion on April 13, 2014, where she defeated Randi West in a Strap Match. Knuckles found championship success soon thereafter, as she won Resistance Pro Wrestling's Women's Championship on April 25 and, while teaming with Matt Tremont, won Women Superstars Uncensored's King and Queen of the Ring tournament on May 10.

After defeating Nick Esteban in an intergender Falls Count Anywhere Match on March 28, 2015, Knuckles announced she would be quitting wrestling for a little while and a few weeks later on April 7 revealed that she was once again pregnant. Knuckles made her return to wrestling in May 2016.

2021 would be a calendar year for Knuckles as she had notable matches with the likes of AKIRA, Kennedi Copeland, Charlie Kruel and Randi West. She also competed at TKW Madness (featuring the Kaos Kup Deathmatch Tournament) on March 20, 2021, ICW Hardcore Death Match Challenge 2021 on May 29, 2021, AWR Asylum Deathmatch Tournament 2021 on July 11, 2021, CCW Goddess Of Gore 2 on October 3, 2021, AWR Goddess Of Death on October 16, 2021, and H2O Tremont's Deathmatch Tournament on October 30, 2021. Knuckles would stay active in the early 2020s competing in various Deathmatches for many promotions in the United States, including being a finalist in Tournament of Death 19 and Tournament Of Death 20, competing in Insane 8 2022 and 2023, and winning Slave To The Deathmatch 14 in September 2023. Knuckles had a very notable match with Lufisto at ICW No Holds Barred Volume 44 in March 2023. Knuckles was also successful in winning Tremont's Deathmatch Tournament 4 in October 2023.

In 2024, Knuckles won a her first major deathmatch tournament claiming Combat Zone Wrestling's Tournament of Death 21 crown after losing in the finals the previous two years. She returned to defend the championship the following year at Tournament of Death 22, losing a Three-way 300 Light Tubes Tokyo Tower Deathmatch to Shlak.

In August 2026, Knuckles was hospitalized after suffering severe burns when she was thrown into a box that was lit on fire during a show for P.O.R. Wrestling.

=== H2O Tremont's Death Match Tournament (2021, 2023) ===
In 2021, Knuckles participated in this hardcore tournament, known for its extreme matches. She competed again in this tournament on October 29, 2023, highlighting her ongoing involvement in hardcore wrestling.

=== BJW Big Japan Pro Wrestling (2024–present) ===
In December 2024, Knuckles competed in the Land of the Rising Sun for BJW at the BJW King Of Deathmatch World GP Tournament. She was defeated in the Second round by Daiju Wakamatsu in a Fluorescent Lighttubes Twin Tower Death Match. Having Made a strong impression on the Japanese crowd, She wrestled a few more matches on the Tour and is slated to return to Japan in 2025.

=== Juggalo Championship Wrestling (2024–2025) ===
In October 2024, Knuckles returned to Juggalo Championship Wrestling, tagging with Super Beast and losing to Dani Mo and Facade. Knuckles continued to wrestle on the Tour of Terror, primarily in singles matches, throughout late 2024 and early 2025.

=== Ladies Knight Out 16 (2026) ===
In April 2026, she participated in Ladies Knight Out 16 with PWO, Tara Zep, Lindsey Snow, Su Yung, Haley J and Gypsy Mac.

== Championships and accomplishments ==
- Absolute Intense Wrestling
  - AIW Women's Championship (1 time)
- Allied Independent Wrestling Federations
  - AIWF Women's Championship (1 time)
- Brew City Wrestling
  - BCW Women's Championship (1 time)
- Cape Championship Wrestling
  - Women's Tournament (2017)
- Coliseum Championship Wrestling
  - CCW Wrestling Evansville Hardcore Championship (1 time)
- Combat Zone Wrestling
  - Tournament of Death 21 (2024)
- Divine Pro Wrestling
  - DPW Championship (1 time, current)
- Fusion Ichiban Pro Wrestling
  - FIPW Kawai Women's Championship (1 time)
- Girl Fight
  - Girl Fight Championship (1 time, current)
  - Girl Fight Tournament (2020)
- Independent Wrestling Association Deep South
  - IWA Deep South Tag Team Championship (1 time) – with Ian Rotten
- Independent Wrestling Association Mid-South
  - IWA Mid-South Tag Team Championship (1 time)^{1} – with Josh Abercrombie and Devon Moore
  - IWA Mid-South Women's Championship (3 times)
  - Queen of the Deathmatch Tournament (2006)
- Juggalo Championship Wrestling
  - JCW World Tag Team Championship (1 time) – with PCO as Luciano Family Enterprises
- NWA Midwest
  - NWA Midwest Women's Championship (2 times)
- NWA Underground
  - NWA Underground Women's Championship (1 time)
- Ohio Valley Wrestling
  - OVW Women's Championship (3 times)
- POR
  - POR World Championship (1 time)
  - POR The Hardcore Grand Prix V
- Pro Wrestling Freedom
  - PWF Tag Team Championship (1 time) – with Ryan Dookie
- Pro Wrestling Illustrated
  - Ranked No. 25 of the top 50 female wrestlers in the PWI Female 50 in 2008
  - Ranked No. 390 of the top 500 singles wrestlers in the PWI 500 in 2021
- Resistance Pro Wrestling
  - RPW Women's Championship (1 time)
- Universal Independent Wrestling
  - UIW Women's Championship (1 time)
- Women Superstars Uncensored
  - WSU King and Queen of the Ring (2014) – with Matt Tremont
- Women's Wrestling Hall of Fame
  - Class of 2026
- X Brand Wrestling
  - Wicked 13 (2025)
- Xtreme Pro Wrestling
  - XPW Women's Championship (1 time, current)
- Other Accomplishments
  - Florida Deathmatch Carnival (2025)

^{1}The IWA Mid-South Tag Team Championship was held jointly between Knuckles, Abercrombie and Moore under the Freebird Rule.
