= JCW Carnival of Chaos =

2026 Juggalo Championship Wrestling event

Carnival of Chaos
- Promotional poster
- Promotion: Juggalo Championship Wrestling
- Date: September 24, 2026
- City: Jeffersonville, Indiana
- Venue: The ArenA

Juggalo Championship Wrestling event chronology
← Previous; 99 Rewind	Next → Hallowicked

Other on-screen personnel
Role:	Name:
Commentators	Joe Dombrowski
Commentators	Mark Roberts
Ring announcer	Kid Cadet
Interviewer	Mac Davis

Carnival of Chaos was a professional wrestling livestreaming event produced by Juggalo Championship Wrestling (JCW). It took place on September 24, 2026, at The ArenA in Jeffersonville, Indiana and streamed live on YouTube as the 100th episode of JCW Lunacy.

== Production ==
=== Background ===
On May 3, 2024, JCW taped its first four episodes of JCW Lunacy at the Newport Music Hall in Columbus, Ohio. Titled The Juggalos Strike Back, the show featured various talent from the independent circuit, JCW's regular roster, All Elite Wrestling (AEW) talent, and talent from the National Wrestling Alliance (NWA). In addition to the premiere taping, JCW taped an additional four episodes at the Harpos Concert Theatre in Detroit, Michigan on June 22, 2024, which featured the debuts of Matt Cardona and the Nu Backseat Boyz consisting of Tommy and JP Grayson with their manager Johnny Kashmere On August 28, 2024, JCW aired the first episode of Lunacy on YouTube which featured a promo from Violent J of the Insane Clown Posse and also featured Joe Galli and Manny Fresh on commentary. From October 23, 2024, to October 29, 2024, JCW streamed seven live Lunacy episodes as part of their build up to the Devil's Night Creature Double Feature pay-per-view on the Train of Terror Tour.

On August 12, 2025, JCW streamed its first live Gathering of the Juggalos episode at Legend Valley in Thornville, Ohio as part of the build up to the JCW vs. GCW: The 2 Day War pay-per-view which featured talent representing JCW and Game Changer Wrestling (GCW).

On September 18, 2025, JCW held a taping for the 2 Tuff Country special which later aired on October 30, 2026, as an episode of Lunacy at The ArenA in Jeffersonville, Indiana, marking the first time the promotion had held an event in the Louisville, Kentucky metropolitan area.

On the November 6, 2025 episode of Lunacy which was taped on October 20, 2025, Big Vito would make his JCW debut when he was revealed as the enforcer of a "mystery investor". Vito continued to make appearances and butt heads with Violent J until the debut of the "mystery investor". On October 26, 2025, Vince Russo, a high-profile pro wrestling writer and booker, was announced as an on-screen investor in JCW and would take up the role of the lead writer for the promotion.

On the August 20, 2026 episode of Lunacy, Mad Man Pondo made his JCW return after an eight-month absence following a match with Mosh Pit Mike and served as a special guest referee for several matches on various events including Bloodymania 19 and several Lunacy tapings. On September 3, 2026, JCW announced the 99 Rewind event which would take place on September 17, 2026, at in New Baltimore, Michigan. In addition to this announcement, JCW announced that they would be releasing a comic book during the event along with a new Violent J solo single titled The Lunacy Lunatic during the event with only 1,000 copies of the single being handed out to attendees. On the September 10, 2026 episode of Lunacy, JCW announced that Violent J, Mark Roberts, and Joe Dombrowski would be the hosts for the event.

On September 10, 2026, JCW announced that they would be returning to Jeffersonville for a special livestreamed 100th episode of Lunacy titled Carnival of Chaos along with the full card of the event featuring a Team JCW vs. Team GCW match, Donovan Dijak fighting against Mr. Happy, and all of JCW's championships being defended.

=== Storylines ===
Carnival of Chaos featured professional wrestling matches that involves different wrestlers from pre-existing scripted feuds and storylines. Wrestlers portrayed villains, heroes, or less distinguishable characters in scripted events that built tension and culminated in a wrestling match or series of matches. Storylines were produced on Juggalo Championship Wrestling's various events and on their weekly internet show JCW Lunacy.

== Matches ==
No.	Results	Stipulations	Times
1	Choppa City (Atiba and Bruce Wayans) (c) defeated The Headbangers (Mosh and Thrasher) by pinfall	Tag team match for the JCW World Tag Team Championship	5:24
2	Mr. Happy defeated Donovan Dijak (with Jasmin St. Claire) by disqualification	Singles match	6:38
3	Father Bronson (c) defeated Kerry Morton defeated by disqualification	Singles 5 minute challenge match for the JCW American Championship	5:01
4	Juggalo World Order (2 Tuff Tony, Willie Mack, and Painful Paul) (with Violent J) defeated Team GCW (Slade, Otis Cogar, and Nick Gage) (with Brett Lauderdale) by pinfall	Six-man tag team match Mad Man Pondo served as the special guest referee.	12:10
5	Big Vito vs. Sally Boy ended in a no contest	Singles match	—
6	Bulk Rogan defeated Colby Corino, Mecha Wolf, Ninja Mack, Simon Gotch, Rae Larson, Shannon Moore, JP Grayson, Tommy Grayson, Facade, Haley J, J-Rod, Mickie Knuckles, Tarzan Duran, Breyer Wellington, Sonny Kiss, Amazing Maria, Rob Conway, Sophia Rose, and Bigfoot Hunter Mike by last eliminating Breyer Wellington	20 man Country Time Rumble match for the vacant JCW Battle Royal Championship	—
7	Dani Mo (c) vs. Alice Crowley ended in a no contest	Singles match for the JCW Women's Championship	—
8	Josh Bishop (with Joel Gertner) (c) defeated Krule and CoKane by pinfall	Three-way match for the JCW "Linear" World Heavyweight Championship	—
9	Caleb Konley (c) defeated Shane Mercer by pinfall	Singles match for the JCW World Heavyweight Championship	16:51
(c) / – the champion(s) heading into the match
