= JCW Panic Zone =

2026 Juggalo Championship Wrestling event

Panic Zone
- Promotion: Juggalo Championship Wrestling
- Date: March 22, 2026
- City: Lansing, Michigan
- Venue: Grewal Hall at 224

Juggalo Championship Wrestling event chronology
← Previous; March Massacre Tour	Next → Strangle-Mania: Viva Las Violence

Panic Zone, also referred to as The Panic Zone and JCW Lunacy: The Panic Zone, was a professional wrestling livestreaming event produced by Juggalo Championship Wrestling (JCW) which took place on March 22, 2026 at Grewal Hall at 224 in Lansing, Michigan and was streamed live on YouTube, Twitch, and Facebook.

== Production ==
=== Background ===
Other on-screen personnel
Role:	Name:
Disc jockey	DJ Clay
Commentators	Joe Dombrowski
Commentators	Mark Roberts
Ring announcer	Kid Cadet
Interviewer	Mac Davis

On the November 6, 2025 episode of Lunacy which was taped on October 20, 2025, Big Vito would make his JCW debut when he was revealed as the enforcer of a "mystery investor". Vito would continue to make appearances and butt heads with Violent J until the debut of the "mystery investor". On October 26, 2025, Vince Russo, a high-profile pro wrestling writer and booker, was announced as an on-screen investor in JCW and would take up the role of the lead writer for the promotion.

During the Hallowicked taping on October 31, 2025 in Detroit, Matt Cardona would defeat 2 Tuff Tony to win the JCW Heavyweight Championship. One day after the episode aired, it was announced that Matt Cardona had signed a contract with WWE and made his return on Friday Night SmackDown on January 2, 2026 and would vacate all of the championships he had held before signing including the JCW Heavyweight Championship.

On January 17, 2026 during the Carnival of Chaos Tour in Denver, Colorado, Facade won the JCW American Championship for the first time after defeating Ninja Mack. On January 18, 2026 in Albuquerque, New Mexico, Mr. Anderson won the JCW World Heavyweight Championship which was vacated when Matt Cardona had signed with WWE by defeating James Storm. On February 28, 2026 during the second night of Juggalo Weekend in Hialeah, Florida, CoKane won the JCW World Heavyweight Championship for the first time after he defeated Mr. Anderson.

=== Storylines ===
Panic Zone featured professional wrestling matches that involves different wrestlers from pre-existing scripted feuds and storylines. Wrestlers portrayed villains, heroes, or less distinguishable characters in scripted events that built tension and culminated in a wrestling match or series of matches. Storylines were produced on Juggalo Championship Wrestling's various events and on their weekly internet show JCW Lunacy.

== Results ==
No.	Results	Stipulations	Times
1	CoKane (with Steven Flowe) defeated Disco Ray (with The Ring Rat) by pinfall	Singles match	5:53
2	Amazing Maria and Haley J defeated Gisele Shaw and J-Rod by pinfall	Tag team match	8:15
3	Facade and The Brothers of Funstruction (Yabo The Clown and Ruffo The Clown) defeated St. Claire Monster Corporation (Beastman, Kongo Kong, and Mr. Happy) (with Jasmin St. Claire) by pinfall	Six-man tag team match	9:00
4	Alice Crowley defeated Dani Mo by pinfall	Singles match	6:06
5	Luciano Family Enterprises (Mickie Knuckles and PCO) (with Big Vito) defeated The Outbreak (Abel Booker and Jacksyn Crowley) by pinfall	Tag team match	3:37
6	Caleb Konley defeated Luigi Primo by pinfall	Singles match	6:30
7	Nic Nemeth defeated Kerry Morton and Shane Mercer by pinfall	No disqualification two-on-one handicap match	12:10
