= JCW The Assault =

2026 professional wrestling event in Ohio

The Assault
- Promotion: Juggalo Championship Wrestling
- Date: May 21, 2026
- City: Columbus, Ohio
- Venue: King of Clubs

Juggalo Championship Wrestling event chronology
← Previous; Strangle-Mania: Viva Las Violence	Next → Mayday! On the Front Lines

The Assault, also referred to as JCW Lunacy: The Assault was a professional wrestling special event produced by Juggalo Championship Wrestling (JCW). The event took place on May 21, 2026 at the King of Clubs in Columbus, Ohio and was streamed live on YouTube and Facebook as a special episode of JCW Lunacy.

== Production ==
=== Background ===
Other on-screen personnel
Role:	Name:
Disc jockey	DJ Clay
Commentators	Joe Dombrowski
Commentators	Mark Roberts
Commentators	Dani Mo
Commentators	Vince Russo
Ring announcer	Kid Cadet
Interviewer	Mac Davis

On January 17, 2026 during the Carnival of Chaos Tour, Facade won the JCW American Championship after defeating Caleb Konley.

On April 17, 2026 during the Strangle-Mania: Viva Las Violence pay-per-view in Paradise, Nevada, J-Rod won the JCW Women's Championship after defeating Alice Crowley in a special tag team match in which the two wrestlers teamed up with Nyla Rose and Dani Mo respectively.

On the May 1, 2026 episode of JCW Lunacy, EC3 and The Green Phantom had made their in-ring debuts in the promotion with EC3 fighting Kerry Morton and the Green Phantom fighting Facade.

On May 4, 2026, JCW announced that they would be holding a live special episode of Lunacy titled The Assault at the King of Clubs in Columbus, Ohio one day before the first night of Mayday! On the Front Lines.

=== Storylines ===
The Assault featured professional wrestling matches that involves different wrestlers from pre-existing scripted feuds and storylines. Wrestlers portrayed villains, heroes, or less distinguishable characters in scripted events that built tension and culminated in a wrestling match or series of matches. Storylines were produced on Juggalo Championship Wrestling's various events and on their weekly internet show, JCW Lunacy.

== Results ==
No.	Results	Stipulations	Times
1	J-Rod (c) defeated Alice Crowley by disqualification	Singles match for the JCW Women's Championship	4:03
2	Facade (c) vs. Father Bronson ended in a no contest	Singles match for the JCW American Championship	8:18
3	Future Endeavors (Matt Cross and Shane Mercer) defeated Choppa City (Atiba and Bruce Wayans) by pinfall	Tag team match	5:07
4	Caleb Konley defeated The Soultaker by pinfall	Singles four weeks of hell match	6:17
5	Gisele Shaw defeated Freya The Slaya (w/Breyer Wellington) by pinfall	Singles best out of three match series	7:01
(c) / – the champion(s) heading into the match
