= Carnival of Chaos Tour =

2026 American concert and professional wrestling tour

- Promotional poster
- Promotion: Juggalo Championship Wrestling
- Date: January 17–18, 2026 (aired January 29, 2026, February 6, 2026, February 12, 2026, and February 19, 2026)
- City: Night 1: Denver Colorado; Night 2: Albuquerque, New Mexico
- Venue: Night 1: Summit Music Hall; Night 2: Sunshine Theater

Juggalo Championship Wrestling event chronology
← Previous; Big Ballas Holiday Party	Next → Juggalo Weekend

The Carnival of Chaos Tour was a concert and professional wrestling tour produced by Juggalo Championship Wrestling (JCW) and Psychopathic Records. The tour took place on January 17, 2026 at the Summit Music Hall in Denver, Colorado and January 18, 2026 at the Sunshine Theater in Albuquerque, New Mexico with professional wrestling matches airing on tape delay on January 29, February 5, February 12, and February 19, 2026 as episodes of JCW Lunacy. The tour also featured live music performances from Green Jelly, Ouija Macc, Wakko The Kidd, and Sammy Sosa.

== Production ==
=== Background ===
Other on-screen personnel
Role:	Name:
Commentators	Joe Dombrowski
Commentators	Veda Scott
Commentators	Kerry Morton
Ring announcer	Mark Roberts
Interviewer	Mac Davis

On the November 6, 2025 episode of Lunacy which was taped on October 20, 2025, Big Vito would make his JCW debut when he was revealed as the enforcer of a "mystery investor". Vito would continue to make appearances and butt heads with Violent J until the debut of the "mystery investor". On October 26, 2025, Vince Russo, a high-profile pro wrestling writer and booker, was announced as an on-screen investor in JCW and would take up the role of the lead writer for the promotion.

During the Hallowicked taping on October 31, 2025 in Detroit, Matt Cardona would defeat 2 Tuff Tony to win the JCW Heavyweight Championship. One day after the episode aired, it was announced that Matt Cardona had signed a contract with WWE and made his return on Friday Night SmackDown on January 2, 2026 and would vacate all of the championships he had held before signing including the JCW Heavyweight Championship.

=== Storylines ===
The Carnival of Chaos Tour featured professional wrestling matches that involves different wrestlers from pre-existing scripted feuds and storylines. Wrestlers portrayed villains, heroes, or less distinguishable characters in scripted events that built tension and culminated in a wrestling match or series of matches. Storylines were produced on Juggalo Championship Wrestling's various events and on their weekly streaming show JCW Lunacy.

== Results ==
Night 1 - January 17, 2026
No.	Results	Stipulations	Times
1	Facade [2] defeated Ninja Mack (c) [1] by pinfall	Best of three match series for the JCW American Championship	4:57
2	PCO defeated Sewacide by pinfall	Singles match	1:54
3	Mr. Anderson defeated Hunter Grey by pinfall	Singles match	4:19
4	Haley J (c) vs. Alice Crowley vs. Dani Mo vs. Mickie Knuckles ended in a no contest	Four-way gauntlet match for the JCW Women's Championship	4:19
5	CoKane defeated Caleb Konley and Kerry Morton by pinfall	Three-way JCW World Heavyweight Championship #1 contendership match	4:19
6	CoKane vs. Kerry Morton ended in a no contest	JCW World Heavyweight Championship #1 contendership match	6:24
7	Caleb Konley defeated Hunter Grey	Singles match	3:58
8	Choppa City (Atiba and Bruce Wayans) defeated The Outbreak (Abel Booker and Jacksyn Crowley) (with Barnabas The Bizarre) by disqualification	Tag team match	1:25
9	Dani Mo defeated J-Rod	Backlot street fight	2:23
10	Luciano Family Enterprises (Mickie Knuckles and PCO) defeated The Brothers of Funstruction (Ruffo The Clown and Yabo The Clown)	Funhouse match	5:13
(c) / – the champion(s) heading into the match

Night 2 - January 18, 2026
No.	Matches*	Stipulations	Times
1	Facade (c) defeated Kerry Morton by disqualification	Singles match for the JCW American Championship	4:04
2	PCO defeated Mike Dairyaire by pinfall	Singles match	2:47
3	The Brothers of Funstruction (Ruffo The Clown and Yabo The Clown) (c) vs. The Outbreak (Abel Booker and Jacksyn Crowley) (with Barnabas The Bizarre) ended in a no contest	Tag team match for the JCW World Tag Team Championship	4:19
4	Mr. Anderson defeated James Storm by pinfall	Singles match for the vacant JCW World Heavyweight Championship	9:40
5	Mike Urlacher defeated Ninja Mack by pinfall	Singles match	4:19
6	CoKane vs. Kerry Morton ended in a no contest	JCW World Heavyweight Championship #1 contendership match	3:15
7	J-Rod defeated Amazing Maria	Singles match	2:51
8	Caleb Konley vs. CoKane ended in a no contest	JCW World Heavyweight Championship #1 contendership match	4:48
9	The Brothers of Funstruction (Ruffo The Clown & Yabo The Clown) (c) defeated The Outbreak (Abel Booker and Jacksyn Crowley) (with Barnabas The Bizarre)	Steel cage match for the JCW World Tag Team Championship	6:35
10	Luciano Family Enterprises (Mickie Knuckles and PCO) (with Big Vito) defeat St. Claire Monster Corporation (Kongo Kong and Mr. Happy) (with Jasmin St. Claire)	Tag team match	3:55
(c) / – the champion(s) heading into the match; *Card subject to change

== Music performers ==
- Ouija Macc
- Wakko The Kidd
- Green Jelly
- Sammy Sosa
