= List of Juggalo Championship Wrestling personnel =

This is a list of current employees of the professional wrestling promotion Juggalo Championship Wrestling (JCW), formerly called Juggalo Championshit Wrestling or Juggalo Championshxt Wrestling. On December 19, 1999, JCW was launched and released several DVDs in the following years.

The talents consisted of a mix of rappers, independent wrestlers, and well known names from promotions such as World Wrestling Federation (now World Wrestling Entertainment), Extreme Championship Wrestling, and World Championship Wrestling, with many of them performing under pseudonyms or parody alternate-names. JCW began broadcasting the internet wrestling show SlamTV! on April 7, 2007. The show instituted a change in JCW's roster, with the promotion focusing on independent and hardcore wrestlers, while also bringing in established names on a consistent basis.

In 2024, JCW launched Lunacy which began airing on YouTube on August 28, 2024.

== Roster ==
=== Men's division ===
Ring name	Real name	Notes	Ref
2 Tuff Tony	Anthony Borcherding		
Abel Booker			
Atiba		Current JCW World Tag Team Champion	
Bigfoot			
Big Vito	Vito Lograsso		
Bootleg Dave			
Bruce Wayans	Asa Poole	Current JCW World Tag Team Champion	
Bulk Rogan		Current JCW Battle Royal Champion	
Caleb Konley	Mason Caleb Burnett		
CoKane	Quinn Whittock		
EC3			
Facade	Michael Cichowicz		
Father Bronson	Satchel Babineau	Current JCW American Champion	
HoKane	Erica Leigh		
Jacksyn Crowley	Jonathan Porterfield		
Jeeves	Jeremy Toma-Cooper		
Josh Bishop	Joshua Bishop		
JP Grayson	Justin Parker DuBoff		
Krule	Matthew Waters		
Mad Man Pondo	Kevin Canady		
Matt Cross	Matthew Capiccioni		
Mosh Pit Mike			
Nic Nemeth	Nicholas Theodore Nemeth	Current JCW World Heavyweight Champion	
Orange Phantom	Joseph Fitzmorris		
Sally Boy			
Shane Mercer	Timothy Shane Goode		
Steven Flowe	Stephen Schmidt		
Tarzan Duran/Ugh	Randall Michael Christie		
Tommy Grayson	Spencer Andrew DuBoff		
Vincenzo	Vincent Massaro		
Willie Mack	Willie McClinton Jr.		

=== Women's division ===
Ring name	Real name	Notes	Ref
Alice Crowley	Alice Fisher		
Dani Mo	Danielle Morrison	Current JCW Women's Champion	
Haley J			
J-Rod	Jessica Roden		
Ring Rat	Paige Collett		
Mickie Knuckles			

=== Stables and tag teams ===
Name	Members	Notes	Notes
Backseat Boyz	JP Grayson; Tommy Grayson		
Choppa City	Atiba; Bruce Wayans	Current JCW World Tag Team Champions	
Juggalo World Order	2 Tuff Tony; EC3; Jeeves; Painful Paul; Sally Boy; Violent J Willie Mack		
Luciano Family	Big Vito; Vincenzo; Krule; Painful Paul		
The Outbreak	Abel Booker; Jacksyn Crowley		

=== Other on-air personnel ===
Ring name	Real name	On-screen role	Notes	Ref
Joe Dombrowski	Joseph Dombrowski	Commentator		
Veda Scott		Commentator		
Kid Cadet		Ring announcer		
Barnabas The Bizarre	David Barnabas Spector	Manager		
Joel Gertner		Manager		
Mark Roberts		Commentator; Ring announcer		
Violent J	Joseph Bruce	Commissioner		
