= Hella Pain & Diamond Rain Tour =

2025 American concert and professional wrestling tour

- Promotional poster featuring various JCW wrestlers, Violent J, and Ouija Macc
- Promotion: Juggalo Championship Wrestling
- Date: April 24–27, 2025 (aired May 1, 2025, May 8, 2025, May 13, 2025, May 22, 2025, May 29, 2025, June 5, 2025, and June 12, 2025)
- City: Night 1: Belvidere, Illinois; Night 2: Joliet, Illinois; Night 3: Cleveland, Ohio; Night 4: Columbus, Ohio
- Venue: Night 1: Apollo Theatre; Night 2: The Forge; Night 3: TempleLive at Cleveland Masonic; Night 4: Columbus Athenaeum

Juggalo Championship Wrestling event chronology
← Previous; JCW vs. ALW Wicked Game	Next → JCW vs. Imperial Pro Invasion

The Hella Pain & Diamond Rain Tour was a professional wrestling and concert tour produced by Juggalo Championship Wrestling (JCW) and its parent company Psychopathic Records. The tour took place on April 24, 2025 at the Apollo Theatre in Belvidere, Illinois, April 25, 2025 at The Forge in Joliet, Illinois, April 26, 2025 at TempleLive at Cleveland Masonic in Cleveland, Ohio, and April 27, 2025 at the Columbus Athenaeum in Columbus, Ohio. The tour also featured music performances from Violent J of the Insane Clown Posse and Ouija Macc. All four nights of the tour also acted as tapings for JCW's weekly streaming show, JCW Lunacy, on YouTube and Facebook.

== Production ==
=== Background ===
On March 17, 2024, JCW held the first tapings for their new show titled JCW Lunacy would take place on May 3, 2024 at the Newport Music Hall in Columbus, Ohio. Titled The Juggalos Strike Back, the show would feature various talent from the independent circuit, JCW's regular roster, All Elite Wrestling (AEW) talent, and talent from the National Wrestling Alliance (NWA). In addition to the premiere taping, JCW held a second taping on June 22, 2024 at the Harpos Concert Theatre in Detroit, Michigan which featured the debuts Matt Cardona and the Nu Backseat Boyz consisting of Tommy Grayson and JP Grayson with their manager Johnny Kashmere. On June 10, 2024, Juggalo Championship Wrestling announced that they would launch JCW Lunacy as a bi-weekly show and would feature talent from the National Wrestling Alliance (NWA), Major League Wrestling (MLW), Total Nonstop Action Wrestling (TNA), All Elite Wrestling (AEW), Lucha Libre AAA Worldwide (AAA), Big Japan Pro Wrestling (BJW), and the independent circuit alongside JCW's regular talent. However, the show's format would abruptly switch to a weekly format beginning on September 4, 2024. The first tapings featured Manny Fresh and NWA play-by-play commentator Joe Galli on commentary and premiered on August 28, 2024. In October 2024, JCW was part of an eight-day tour called the Train of Terror Tour in which each night featured a live broadcast of JCW Lunacy as part of the build up to the Devil's Night pay-per-view.

On February 26, 2025, Psychopathic Records announced the Hella Pain & Diamond Rain Tour which also featured Violent J and Ouija Macc as music performers for each night.

=== Storylines ===
The Hella Pain & Diamond Rain Tour featured professional wrestling matches that involves different wrestlers from pre-existing scripted feuds and storylines. Wrestlers portrayed villains, heroes, or less distinguishable characters in scripted events that built tension and culminated in a wrestling match or series of matches. Storylines were produced on Juggalo Championship Wrestling's various events and on their weekly streaming show JCW Lunacy.

=== Results ===
Other on-screen personnel
Role:	Name:
Commentators	Joe Dombrowski
Commentators	Mark Roberts
Commentators	Zac Amico
Ring announcer	The Ringmaster

Night 1 - April 24, 2025 (aired May 1 and May 8, 2025)
No.	Results	Stipulations	Times
1	Effy defeated Disco Ray by pinfall	Singles match	—
2	Shane Mercer defeated Jake Crist by pinfall	Singles match	—
3	The Brothers of Funstruction (Ruffo The Clown and Yabo The Clown) (c) defeated The Backseat Boyz (JP Grayson and Tommy Grayson) by pinfall	Tag team match for the JCW Tag Team Championship	—
4	Kerry Morton defeated Father Mike and Sonny Kiss by pinfall	Three-way match	—
5	Alice Crowley and Caleb Konley defeated The Neon Blondes (Dani Mo and Facade) by pinfall	Tag team match	—
6	The Wraith defeated Kid Lat by pinfall	Singles match	—
7	The Outbreak (Abel Booker and Jacksyn Crowley) (with Barnabas The Bizarre) defeated Breyer Wellington and Jeeves by pinfall	Tag team match	—
8	Willie Mack (c) defeated Officer Colt Cabana by pinfall	Singles match for the JCW Heavyweight Championship	8:16:
9	St. Claire Monster Corporation (Kongo Kong and Mr. Happy) (with Jasmin St. Claire) defeated Cocaine, Miles Clark, and Steven Flowe by pinfall	Three on two handicap match	—
10	Colby Corino defeated Mickie Knuckles by pinfall	Singles match	12:32
(c) / – the champion(s) heading into the match

Night 2 - April 25, 2025 (aired May 13 and May 22, 2025)
No.	Results	Stipulations
1	Kerry Morton defeated Colby Corino, Jake Crist, and Janitor Mike by pinfall	Four-way JCW Heavyweight Championship #1 contendership match
2	The Outbreak (Abel Booker and Jacksyn Crowley) (with Barnabas The Bizarre) defeated Miles Clark and Steven Flowe by pinfall	Tag team match
3	Sonny Kiss and The Neon Blondes (Dani Mo and Facade) defeated Alice Crowley and The Backseat Boyz (JP Grayson and Tommy Grayson) by pinfall	Six wrestler tag team match
4	Caleb Konley (c) defeated The Wraith by pinfall	Singles match for the JCW American Championship
5	Officer Colt Cabana defeated Mickie Knuckles by pinfall	Singles match
6	Colby Corino defeated Mickie Knuckles by pinfall	Singles match
7	Effy defeated Cocaine by pinfall	Singles match
8	Shane Mercer defeated Breyer Wellington and Jeeves by pinfall	Two-on-one handicap match
9	St. Claire Monster Corporation (Kongo Kong, Mr. Happy, and Painful Paul) (with Jasmin St. Claire) defeated 2 Tuff Tony and The Brothers of Funstruction (Ruffo The Clown and Yabo The Clown) by pinfall	Six-man tag team match
10	Caleb Konley (c) defeated Kid Lat by pinfall	Singles match for the JCW American Championship
11	Kerry Morton defeated Willie Mack (c) by pinfall	Singles match for the JCW Heavyweight Championship
(c) / – the champion(s) heading into the match

Night 3 - April 26, 2025 (aired May 29 and June 6, 2025)
No.	Results	Stipulations
1	The Outbreak (Abel Booker and Jacksyn Crowley) (with Barnabas The Bizarre) defeated The Golden Boys (Jimmy James and RJ Jonesie) by pinfall	Tag team match
2	Alice Crowley defeated Dani Mo (c) and Sonny Kiss by pinfall	Three-way match for the JCW Women's Championship
3	Shane Mercer defeated Miles Clark by pinfall	Singles match
4	2 Tuff Tony defeated Painful Paul by disqualification	Singles match
5	Alice Crowley and Caleb Konley defeated The Neon Blondes (Dani Mo and Facade)	Tag team match
6	Colby Corino defeated Mickie Knuckles by pinfall	Steel cage match
7	Effy defeated Jake Crist by pinfall	Singles match
8	Cocaine and Steven Flowe defeated Breyer Wellington and Jeeves by pinfall	Tag team match
9	The Wraith defeated Kongo Kong (with Jasmin St. Claire) and Saturday Mike Fever by pinfalll	Three-way match
10	The Brothers of Funstruction (Ruffo The Clown and Yabo The Clown) and Willie Mack defeated Caleb Konley and The Backseat Boyz (JP Grayson and Tommy Grayson) by pinfall	Six-man tag team match
11	Kerry Morton (c) defeated Facade by pinfall	Singles match for the JCW Heavyweight Championship
(c) / – the champion(s) heading into the match

Night 4 - April 27, 2025 (aired June 12, 2025)
No.	Results	Stipulations
1	The Backseat Boyz (JP Grayson and Tommy Grayson) defeated Flowe Caine (Cocaine and Steven Flowe) by pinfall	Tag team match
2	Effy (c) defeated The Wraith by disqualification	Singles match for the GCW World Championship
3	Caleb Konley (c) defeated Colby Corino by pinfall	Singles match for the JCW American Championship
4	The Brothers of Funstruction (Ruffo The Clown and Yabo The Clown) (c) defeated Breyer Wellington and Jeeves	Tag team match for the JCW Tag Team Championship
5	Kerry Morton (c) defeated Willie Mack by pinfall	Singles match for the JCW Heavyweight Championship
6	Painful Paul (with Jasmin St. Claire) defeated Hamboner Mike by pinfall	Singles match
7	Mickie Knuckles defeated Miles Clark by pinfall	Singles match
8	Kongo Kong (with Jasmin St. Claire) defeated Sonny Kiss by pinfall	Singles match
9	Alice Crowley (c) defeated Joseline Navarro by pinfall	Singles match for the JCW Women's Championship
10	2 Tuff Tony (with Violent J) defeated Shane Mercer	Singles match
(c) / – the champion(s) heading into the match

== Music performers ==
- Violent J
- Ouija Macc
