= Strangle-Mania: Viva Las Violence =

2026 Juggalo Championship Wrestling event

- Promotional poster
- Promotion: Juggalo Championship Wrestling
- Date: April 17, 2026
- City: Paradise, Nevada
- Venue: Horseshoe Las Vegas
- Attendance: 1,130

Juggalo Championship Wrestling event chronology
← Previous; Panic Zone	Next → The Assault

Strangle-Mania: Viva Las Violence was a professional wrestling pay-per-view (PPV) event produced by Juggalo Championship Wrestling (JCW). The event took place on April 17, 2026 at Horseshoe Las Vegas in Paradise, Nevada and streamed live on Triller TV in conjunction with Game Changer Wrestling's (GCW) Collective during WrestleMania 42 weekend. It is also the third event to use the Strangle-Mania name.

== Production ==
=== Background ===
On March 12, 1996, the Insane Clown Posse released a VHS tape titled ICP's Strangle-Mania, a compilation tape which featured matches from the Outrageously Violent Wrestling From Japan video collection overdubbed with commentary from the ICP themselves with Violent J (Joe Bruce) being called Diamond Donovan "3D" Douglas and Shaggy 2 Dope (Joe Utsler) being called Handsome Harley "Gweedo" Guestella. The success of the video led Bruce and Utsler to co-produce their own wrestling show with the Northern States Wrestling Alliance (NSWA) and booker Dan Curtis titled Strangle-Mania Live which was held at St. Andrews Hall in Detroit, Michigan. The show sold out and featured numerous independent wrestlers such as Mad Man Pondo and Ian Rotten with the Insane Clown Posse themselves main eventing the show against the Chickenboys in a steel cage match. The Insane Clown Posse teamed up with Dan Curtis again to produce a show titled Hellfire Wrestling at the Majestic Theatre in Detroit which featured a 20 man battle royal for the Hellfire Championship as the main event. This was initially going to lead to an eighty-city Hellfire Wrestling tour, but two days after the show, Curtis had passed away in his apartment after a sudden diabetic problem. The Hellfire Wrestling tour was cancelled in the wake of Curtis' passing. A second VHS video tape titled ICP's Strangle-Mania Volume 2 was released on August 4, 1999 which featured several bonus matches and also featured Twiztid's Jamie Madrox as "Lucious" Johnny Stark on commentary.

On December 19, 1999, the Insane Clown Posse teamed up with bookers Brian Gorie and Dave Prazak to hold the first "Juggalo Championshxt Wrestling" show which was taped and released as JCW Volume 1 on May 9, 2000 with commentary provided by the Insane Clown Posse as 3D and Gweedo and Madrox as Johnny Stark. The show was main evented by the Insane Clown Posse fighting team of two Doink the Clowns (played by Tarek The Great and Truth Martini) to become the inaugural JCW Tag Team Champions. When the video was released, it lasted 38 weeks on the Billboard Sports and Recreation Top Sellers list with it charting as high as number 2 at one time. However, Prazak left the promotion due to financial issues, leaving Gordie to book a 15-day Strangle-Mania Live tour from April to May 2000 with dates spanning from Detroit, Michigan to Denver, Colorado. JCW Volume 2 was taped in Milwaukee, Wisconsin on April 19, 2000 and in Cleveland, Ohio on May 4, 2000.

On August 31, 2018, Insane Clown Posse was featured as guests at the inaugural Starrcast convention in Schaumburg, Illinois. At the convention, the duo hosted a panel titled Strangle-Mania with the Insane Clown Posse in which they provided live commentary on the making of the tape and the matches to the live audience. The panel was streamed live on FITE TV.

On January 5, 2026, Game Changer Wrestling announced that JCW would be part of their annual WrestleMania weekend Collective event at Horseshoe Las Vegas in Paradise, Nevada. The event's name would later be revealed on Insane Clown Posse's social media pages as Strangle-Mania: Viva Las Violence and would feature the final match for Vampiro who first held the JCW Heavyweight Championship in 2000.

=== Storylines ===
Strangle-Mania: Viva Las Violence featured professional wrestling matches that involves different wrestlers from pre-existing scripted feuds and storylines. Wrestlers portrayed villains, heroes, or less distinguishable characters in scripted events that built tension and culminated in a wrestling match or series of matches. Storylines were produced on Juggalo Championship Wrestling's various events and on their weekly internet show, JCW Lunacy.

== Results ==
Other on-screen personnel
Role:	Name:
Commentators	Joe Dombrowski
Commentators	Mark Roberts
Commentators	Zac Amico
Commentators	Vince Russo (JCW World Heavyweight Championship match)
Ring announcers	Justin Roberts (JCW World Heavyweight Championship match and main event)
Ring announcers	Kid Cadet
Interviewer	Mac Davis

No.	Results	Stipulations	Times
1	George South and Rock 'n' Roll Express (Ricky Morton and Robert Gibson) defeated St. Claire Monster Corporation (Kongo Kong, Mr. Happy, and Beastman) (with Jasmin St. Claire) by pinfall	Six man tag team match Since St. Claire Monster Corporation lost, they had to disband.	4:22
2	Kerry Morton defeated Mickie Knuckles by pinfall	Kamikaze Chaos match Claude served as the special guest referee.	8:58
3	The Outbreak (Jacksyn Crowley and Abel Booker) (with Barnabas the Bizarre) defeated The Brothers of Funstruction (Yabo the Clown and Ruffo the Clown) and the BackSeat Boyz (Tommy Grayson and JP Grayson) by pinfall	Freak show three way tag team match	7:46
4	Facade (c) defeated Ninja Mack, Mosh Pit Mike (Mikey Avalon), Disco Ray (with the Ring Rat), and Mecha Wolf by pinfall	Five way scramble for the JCW American Championship	10:21
5	J-Rod and Nyla Rose defeated Alice Crowley (c) and Dani Mo by pinfall	Tag team match for the JCW Women's Championship; Whoever secured the winning pinfall became the JCW Women’s Champion; since J-Rod secured the winning pin over Mo, she became the JCW Women’s Champion. Katie Forbes served as the special guest referee.	8:06
6	2 Tuff Tony, Willie Mack, and Rob Van Dam (with Bill Alfonso) defeated Kenta and The Good Brothers (Doc Gallows and Karl Anderson) by pinfall	Six man tag team match	8:56
7	CoKane (c) defeated Matt Riddle and Caleb Konley (with Vince Russo) and Nic Nemeth	Four-way elimination match for the JCW World Heavyweight Championship; EC3 served as the special guest referee	11:23
8	Vampiro (with Insane Clown Posse) defeated PCO and Big Vito by pinfall	Three way match This was Vampiro's retirement match.	10:42
(c) / – the champion(s) heading into the match
