= 2 Tuff Country =

2025 Juggalo Championship Wrestling event

- Promotional poster featuring 2 Tuff Tony, Matt Cardona, Caleb Konley, Kerry Morton, Vampiro, Ricky Morton, Alice Crowley, Willie Mack, Haley J, and Violent J
- Promotion: Juggalo Championship Wrestling
- Date: September 18, 2025 (aired October 30, 2025)
- City: Jeffersonville, Indiana
- Venue: The ArenA

Juggalo Championship Wrestling event chronology
← Previous; Houston Heat	Next → Hallowicked

2 Tuff Country was a professional wrestling special event produced by Juggalo Championship Wrestling. The show was taped on September 18, 2025, at The ArenA in Jeffersonville, Indiana, and aired on October 30, 2025, as a special episode of JCW Lunacy on YouTube and Facebook.

== Production ==
=== Background ===
After a four-week hiatus following the 2 Day War pay-per-view ending with 2 Tuff Tony winning the JCW Heavyweight Championship against Matt Tremont, JCW returned with a live episode of Lunacy at the Bomb Factory in Dallas, Texas. During the episode, Vampiro made his return to JCW as a commentator alongside Veda Scott who provided commentary for the Powder Keg pay-per-view. In addition to the new additions to the commentary team, Suicide made his debut in the promotion after being revealed by Luigi Primo to be his tag team partner. However, technical difficulties had caused the episode to be re-taped in San Antonio, Texas. The episode also saw the JCW debut of Ninja Mack who fought Caleb Konley in a non-title match. On the 49th episode of Lunacy during the main event, 2 Tuff Tony defended the JCW Heavyweight Championship against Kerry Morton who had been absent since the 2 Day War pay-per-view. However, Haley J and her tag team partner Luscious Lawrence attacked Tony and resulted in the match being declared a no contest.

During the Houston Heat event which took place on September 15, 2025, Painful Paul defeated Moshtronaut Mike, however, he was attacked by the St. Claire Monster Corporaton consisting of Kongo Kong, Mr. Happy, and their manager Jasmin St. Claire. This would be the final JCW match for Painful Paul. On the October 24, 2025 episode of JCW Lunacy which was taped on September 17, 2025, at the Minglewood Hall in Memphis, Tennessee, talent from Memphis Wrestling made their JCW debuts including the Disorderlies, Big John Dalton, Tim Bosby, Xya Wolf, Ray Sanders, Nyxx, and the Shocker. The main event would consist of 2 Tuff Tony defending the JCW Heavyweight Championship against former WWE ID wrestler Aaron Roberts. At the end of the match, Vampiro set up an ambush where he debuted the "Trifecta of Terror" which consisted of Mickie Knuckles and Mad Man Pondo who had been previously released from JCW amid the aftermath of Powder Keg.

=== Storylines ===
2 Tuff Country featured professional wrestling matches that involves different wrestlers from pre-existing scripted feuds and storylines. Wrestlers portrayed villains, heroes, or less distinguishable characters in scripted events that built tension and culminated in a wrestling match or series of matches. Storylines were produced on Juggalo Championship Wrestling's various events and on their weekly internet show JCW Lunacy.

=== Aftermath ===
During the main event match between 2 Tuff Tony and Matt Cardona, Vampiro and the Trifecta of Terror consisting of Mickie Knuckles and Mad Man Pondo had arrived at ringside to cheer on Cardona after being warned by Violent J that they would be arrested for trespassing. On the November 6, 2025 episode of Lunacy, Big Vito made his debut as an enforcer for the mystery investor who would later be revealed to be Vince Russo.

== Results ==
Other on-screen personnel
Role:	Name:
Commentators	Joe Dombrowski
Commentators	Mark Roberts
Commentators	Veda Scott
Ring announcers	The Ringmaster

No.	Results	Stipulations	Times
1	Bustah And The Brain (Alec Price and Jordan Oliver) defeated Flowe Caine (Cocaine and Steven Flowe) by pinfall	Tag team match	8:11
2	Caleb Konley (with Jeeves) (c) defeated Ninja Mack by pinfall	Singles match for the JCW American Championship	7:43
3	Willie Mack defeated Shane Mercer by pinfall	Singles match	8:21
4	Haley J (with Amazing Maria) defeated Alice Crowley (c) by pinfall	Singles match for the JCW Women's Championship	6:58
5	The Outbreak (Abel Booker and Jacksyn Crowley) (with Barnabas The Bizarre) defeated Detective Mike and Suicide by pinfall	Tag team match	7:41
6	Kerry Morton defeated Ricky Morton (c), Bizircus, Black Dahlia and Cocaine, Eli Cruze and Ethan Heyre, Jeeves, Kash Jackson and Kevo Thrives, Marcellus Mack, Midnight, Ninja Mack, OG Ugly, Ram Jam, Robert Katchem, Shane Mercer, and Steven Flowe by eliminating Ricky Morton	2 Tuff Country Rumble match for the JCW Battle Royal Championship	21:57
7	2 Tuff Tony (c) defeated Matt Cardona by pinfall	Singles match for the JCW Heavyweight Championship	11:04
(c) / – the champion(s) heading into the match
