= The ArenA =

Professional wrestling arena in Jeffersonville, Indiana

- Jeffersonville Arena; Grindhouse Arena
- Interactive map of The ArenA
- Former names: Davis Arena
- Location: 1416 Spring St, Jeffersonville, Indiana 47130; United States
- Coordinates: 38.28492°N 85.74837°W
- Owner: Anthony Borcherding; Rudy Switchblade
- Capacity: 125–150

Construction
- Opened: 1996

Tenants
- Ohio Valley Wrestling (1996–2002, 2020); Grindhouse Pro Wrestling (2017–present)

Website
- https://www.wergrindhouse.com/

The ArenA, formerly known as the Davis Arena and is also known as the Jeffersonville Arena and the Grindhouse Arena, is an arena located in Jeffersonville, Indiana and is primarily used for professional wrestling. The arena originally opened in 1996 and was formerly home to Ohio Valley Wrestling and the accompanying OVW Academy.

== History ==
On January 16, 1998, OVW would hold the first taping of its weekly television series, emanating from the venue. Louisville Gardens ring announcer Dean Hill served as play by play commentator alongside Faye Davis as the Ring Announcer. The show featured an introduction to the company by owner Danny Davis, with the main event consisting of a tag team match featuring Nick Dinsmore and Rob Conway taking on Juan Hurtado and The Assassin #2.

In 1999, World Wrestling Federation (WWF, later World Wrestling Entertainment (WWE)) creative team member and former owner of Smoky Mountain Wrestling, Jim Cornette would purchase a stake in OVW and would take over as booker and show writer while also appearing as an on-air official. Notable wrestlers who were trained at the arena were John Cena, Randy Orton, Brock Lesnar, Dave Bautista, and Shelton Benjamin. The Heartland Wrestling Association (HWA) would also hold television tapings at the venue on September 2, 2001, and December 9, 2001, in addition to the regular tapings and house shows OVW held at the venue.

On August 21, 2002, OVW would hold its final show at the original Davis Arena with Damaja vs. René Duprée being the final main event match OVW would hold at the venue.

Professional wrestling would return to the venue in 2015 when Girl Fight Wrestling (GFW) and Stricktly Nsane Pro Wrestling (SNPW) would hold the first event at the venue since 2002.

On May 1, 2016, IWA Mid-South would begin using the arena as a frequent venue for its shows starting with Derby Madness 2016. The promotion would hold its final show at the arena on October 28, 2021, titled Our Last Spooktacular.

In 2017, former Juggalo Championship Wrestling (JCW) Heavyweight Champion, Anthony Borcherding, better known by his ring name 2 Tuff Tony and had occasionally wrestled in OVW, would purchase the arena alongside former OVW owner Rudy Switchblade and OVW alumni Raul LaMotta. In addition to the purchase, the group would establish Grindhouse Pro Wrestling (GPW) and the Grindhouse Pro Wrestling Academy.

On July 28, 2020, due to the COVID-19 pandemic, OVW would make its return to the arena for its first event and television broadcast since March 3, 2020. The promotion would continue to hold various television broadcasts and tapings from the venue until September 1, 2020. The final OVW event from the venue would take place on September 8, 2020. The arena would also be featured on the Netflix docuseries Wrestlers which followed Al Snow and the OVW promotion's various wrestlers.

On December 4, 2022, Game Changer Wrestling (GCW) would hold its One Afternoon Only pay-per-view at the venue which would feature Tony Deppen fighting Billie Starkz in the main event.

On September 18, 2025, Juggalo Championship Wrestling (JCW) would hold a taping for its weekly show JCW Lunacy at the arena for a special event titled 2 Tuff Country. The event would feature two title changes including Kerry Morton winning the JCW Battle Royal Championship in a "2 Tuff Country Rumble" and Haley J defeating Alice Crowley to win the JCW Women's Championship.
