= Paragon Pro Wrestling =

American defunct professional wrestling promotion

- Logo
- Founded: 2014
- Defunct: 2016
- Style: Professional wrestling
- Headquarters: Las Vegas, Nevada, United States
- Founder(s): Jeff Akin; Todd Keneley
- Owner(s): Jeff Akin; Todd Keneley
- Sister: West Coast Wrestling Connection

Paragon Pro TV
- Genre: Professional wrestling Sports entertainment
- Presented by: Jeff Akin; Todd Keneley
- Starring: PPW roster
- Country of origin: United States
- Original language: English

Production
- Camera setup: Multicamera setup
- Running time: 30 minutes
- Production company: Paragon Pro Wrestling

Original release
- Network: Pop TV
- Release: July 4 – November 24, 2015
- Network: Syndication; Youtoo America; Fight Network
- Release: November 19, 2015 – October 2016
- Network: MSG Network
- Release: January 16, 2016 – October 2016
- Network: FITE TV
- Release: April 1, 2016 – October 2016

Paragon Pro Wrestling (PPW) was an American independent professional wrestling promotion based in Las Vegas, Nevada and owned by West Coast Wrestling Connection commentator Jeff Akin and former Total Nonstop Action Wrestling (TNA) commentator Todd Keneley.

== History ==
On December 9, 2014, PPW held their first show in Las Vegas with the main event being Caleb Konley taking on Mikey O'Shea in a match to crown the inaugural PPW Heavyweight Champion. In April 2015, PPW announced a national television deal with Pop TV in which the promotion would purchase infomercial time for the network. On July 4, 2015, PPW premiered their Paragon Pro TV show at 6 a.m. and would continue to air new episodes every Saturday morning. On September 25, 2015, PPW announced that Paragon Pro TV would be moved to the 8 a.m. time slot beginning November 7, 2015.

On November 19, 2015, just hours after Total Nonstop Action Wrestling announced they had signed a television deal with Pop TV to air Impact, PPW announced that Paragon Pro TV would be leaving the network and that they would be signing syndication deals with Tuff TV, Dish Network, the Fight Network, YouToo America, and local Detroit television station WADL-TV with the final Paragon Pro TV episode on Pop TV airing November 21, 2015. In January 2016, PPW had begun airing on the MSG Network.

On April 1, 2016, PPW announced that they had signed a streaming deal with FITE TV to air Paragon Pro TV in which the program would begin airing on the service beginning on August 17, 2016.

== Championships ==
Championship	Final champion(s)	Date won	Days held	Location
PPW Heavyweight Championship	Alex Chamberlain	October 6, 2015	N/A	Las Vegas, Nevada
PPW American Championship	Darin Corbin	June 9, 2015	N/A	Las Vegas, Nevada
PPW Tag Team Championship	Jessy Sorensen and Wes Brisco	May 31, 2015	N/A	Las Vegas, Nevada
