= National Wrestling Alliance Chicago =

American professional wrestling promotion

- Acronym: NWA Chicago
- Founded: 2024
- Style: Professional wrestling
- Headquarters: Chicago, Illinois
- Founder(s): Bryan Idol; Billy Corgan
- Owner(s): Bryan Idol; Billy Corgan
- Website: https://www.nationalwrestlingalliance.com/nwa-chicago

National Wrestling Alliance Chicago (NWA Chicago) is an American professional wrestling promotion owned by Bryan Idol and Billy Corgan. It is a member of the National Wrestling Alliance territory system.

== History ==
On October 9, 2023, the NWA announced the re-establishment of the territory system beginning with Exodus Pro joining as the first member of the territory system with the first promotion joining the territory system being the Cleveland, Ohio-based promotion Exodus Pro Wrestling, run by EC3. On February 15, 2024, the NWA announced the establishment of a Chicago territory named NWA Chicago.

On February 20, 2024, NWA Chicago announced that their first event titled The Arrival would be taking place on March 8, 2024 at Madame ZuZu's Emporium in Highland Park, Illinois. EC3 was scheduled to be wrestling during NWA Chicago's first event but an illness had forced him to be pulled from the event. Bryan Idol also defended the WWC Television Championship during the event against Anthony Catena along with Kenzie Paige defending the NWA World Women's Championship against Lili La Pescadita.

On October 18, 2024 during the Super Smashing Halloween event at Studio One Events in Highland Park, Illinois, Big Mama won the vacant NWA World Women's Television Championship in a four-way match against Haley J, Natalia Markova, and Tiffany Nieves. On May 9, 2026, former GCW World Champion Effy challenged Silas Mason for the NWA Worlds Heavyweight Championship at NWA Chicago's Reign of Thrill event at Studio One Events in Highland Park, Illinois.

== Championships ==
Championship	Current champion(s)	Date won	Days held	Event	Location	Notes
NWA Chicago Heavyweight Championship	Marshe Rockett	May 9, 2026	174+	Reign of Thrill	Highland Park, Illinois	
NWA Chicago Tag Team Championship	The Hard Way (Dalton McKenzie and Jack Vaughn)	December 5, 2025	329+	Crash Course	Highland Park, Illinois	
