= Haley J =

American professional wrestler (born 1999)

Personal information
- Born: Haley James; September 28, 1999 (age 27) Somerset, Kentucky, U.S.

Professional wrestling career
- Ring names: Haley J; "Hollyhood" Haley J; Hollyhood Haley; Holly Swag
- Billed height: 5 ft 6 in (168 cm)
- Billed weight: 124 lb (56 kg)
- Billed from: Jackson, Tennessee
- Trained by: JC Rotten; Maria James; Ronnie Roberts; 2 Tuff Tony (Grindhouse Pro Wrestling Academy)
- Debut: January 25, 2020

Haley James, (born September 28, 1999) better known by her ring names HollyHood Haley J, Haley J, and Holly Swag is an American professional wrestler who is best known for her work in the independent circuit, particularly with Juggalo Championship Wrestling (JCW) where she previously held the JCW Women's Championship, Reality of Wrestling (ROW) where she previously held the ROW Women's Championship, Ohio Valley Wrestling (OVW) where she was a three-time OVW Women's Champion, IWA Mid-South where she was a two-time IWA Mid-South Women's Champion, and Women of Wrestling (WOW) where she was a two-time WOW World Tag Team Champion with Big Red Betty as the Mother Truckers and with Penelope Pink as the Fabulous 4.

She has also wrestled in All Elite Wrestling (AEW), the National Wrestling Alliance (NWA), Memphis Wrestling, Revolution Pro Wrestling (RevPro), and Game Changer Wrestling (GCW) along with competing in the slap fighting promotion Power Slap owned by Ultimate Fighting Championship chief executive officer Dana White.

== Professional wrestling career ==
=== IWA Mid-South (2020–2021) ===
On January 25, 2020, Haley J made her professional wrestling debut during IWA Mid-South's inaugural BattleBroads event at The ArenA in Jeffersonville, Indiana where she fought Thunderkitty in an old-school IWA Rules match. On February 8, 2020, during the February Fury event, Haley J challenged IWA Mid-South Women's Champion Alice Crowley in a three-way match for the title against Crowley and Hawlee Cromwell. During the Let The Madness Begin event, Haley J won the IWA Mid-South Women's Championship by defeating Alice Crowley in a tables match. On October 24, 2020, during IWA Mid-South's 24th anniversary show, Haley J won the IWA Mid-South Women's Championship for the second time after defeating Thunderkitty.

=== Independent circuit (2020–present) ===
On July 11, 2020, Haley J made her independent professional wrestling debut when she entered into the Loyal Rumble at Paradigm Pro Wrestling and Midwest Territory's Pawcade at the Washington County Fairgrounds in Salem, Indiana.

On November 30, 2025, Haley J defended the ROW Women's Championship during the Ladies Night Out 15 event during WrestleCade at the Benton Convention Center in Winston-Salem, North Carolina.

=== Ohio Valley Wrestling (2020–present) ===
On August 4, 2020, Haley J made her Ohio Valley Wrestling (OVW) debut in a dark match against Billie Starkz at The ArenA in Jeffersonville, Indiana. Two weeks later, she competed in a six-way scramble match for the vacant OVW Women's Championship against Kayla Kassidy, Becky Idol, Billie Starkz, and Alice Crowley. On the February 9, 2021 edition of OVW TV, Haley J won the OVW Women's Championship after defeating Mazzerati. On May 25, 2023, during the All Systems Go special, Haley J won the OVW Women's Championship for the second time when she defeated Shalonce Royal.

=== All Elite Wrestling (2022–2023) ===
Haley J made her All Elite Wrestling (AEW) debut on February 16, 2022, during the taping for the February 21, 2022 episode of AEW Dark: Elevation at the Nashville Municipal Auditorium in Nashville, Tennessee when she fought Ruby Soho. She made her return to AEW on October 18, 2022, at the Heritage Bank Center in Cincinnati, Ohio during the taping for the October 24, 2022 episode of Dark: Elevation when she fought against Serena Deeb. On March 18, 2023, Haley J fought against Ruby Soho during AEW's first House Rules show at the Hobart Arena in Troy, Ohio. On October 21, 2023, Haley J fought against Skye Blue during a live episode of Collision at the FedExForum in Memphis, Tennessee. On November 1, 2023, Haley J wrestled in a dark match against Taya Valkyrie before a live broadcast of Dynamite at the KFC Yum! Center in Louisville, Kentucky. However, this would be Haley J's final AEW match.

=== International promotions (2023–present) ===
On December 3, 2023, Haley J made her international wrestling debut when she teamed up with Amazing Maria in a tag team match against Alexia Nicole and Jody Threat during OVW x Destiny at the Don Kolov Arena in Mississauga, Ontario, Canada. From January 19–22, 2024, Haley J competed in Primos Wrestling Winnipeg's Once Upon A Time in Hollyhood Tour in which she wrestled against Kat Von Heez on three of the nights and on the final night, she teamed up with Marty Scurll in a tag team match against Von Heez and Bobby Sharp.

On February 29, 2024, Haley J made her United Kingdom debut when she fought against Kira Chimera for the vacant IWN Women's Championship during the International Wrestling Network's (IWN) Parade of Champions event at Unit Nine in Milton Keynes, Buckinghamshire, England. On March 1, 2024, Haley J defended the title against Zizi during IWN's All Roads South event at Blackbox Hastings in Hastings, East Sussex, England. On June 29, 2024, Haley J made her RevPro debut when she fought Nightshade during the Raw Deal event at the Gordon Craig Theatre in Stevenage, England. The following night during the Live in Sheffield event at Network in Sheffield, England, Haley J fought against Alex Windsor.

=== Women of Wrestling (2023–present) ===
Haley J made her Women of Wrestling (WOW) debut during the January 21, 2023 episode of WOW Superheroes as Holly Swag, in which she teamed up with Jessie Jones and her mother Big Rig Betty. Betty and Swag also debuted the Mother Truckers tag team in a six-woman tag team match against GI Jane, Ice Cold, and The Disciplinarian. On the March 9, 2024 episode of WOW Superheroes, the Mother Truckers won the WOW World Tag Team Championship for the first time when they defeated Miami's Sweet Heat (Laurie Carlson and Lindsey Carlson). However, on the August 31, 2024 episode of WOW Superheroes, the Mother Truckers lost the titles back to Miami's Sweet Heat.

On the February 1, 2025 episode of WOW Superheroes, Holly Swag joined the Fabulous 4 (Lana Star, Penelope Pink, and Miami's Sweet Heat) and teamed with Pink against The Dojo Defenders (Kara Kai and Tara Strike). Swag and Pink later won the WOW World Tag Team Championship on the April 5, 2025 episode of WOW Superheroes in a fatal four-way match which also featured the champions Big Rigs And Bourbon (Big Rig Betty and Jessie Jones), Princess Aussie and Tormenta, and Miami's Sweet Heat. On the October 4, 2025 episode, Holly Swag and Penelope Pink lost the titles in a steel cage match against Miami's Sweet Heat after Pink turned on Swag.

=== Reality of Wrestling (2024–present) ===
On August 10, 2024, Haley J made her Reality of Wrestling (ROW) debut at the Summer of Champions X event in Texas City, Texas in which she fought against Alejandra Quintanilla. J also competed in the 2024 Sherri Martel Classic tournament on September 29, 2024, in which she defeated Mia Friday to advance to the first round. However, she lost to Gigi Rey and Carlee Bright in a three way semi-final match. On August 9, 2025, during the Summer of Champions 11 event, Haley J won the ROW Women's Championship when she defeated the champion Kiah Dream, Jada Stone, and Promise Braxton in a four-way match.

=== National Wrestling Alliance (2024–present) ===
On August 31, 2024, Haley J made her National Wrestling Alliance (NWA) debut in an NWA World Women's Championship #1 contendership 2024 Mildred Burke invitational gauntlet match during the NWA 76 signature live event at the 2300 Arena in Philadelphia, Pennsylvania. On the November 5, 2024 episode of NWA Powerrr, Haley J teamed up with Tiffany Nieves in a tag team match against Kenzie and Kylie Paige of Pretty Empowered. On October 18, 2024, Haley J competed in a four-way match for the NWA World Women's Television Championship at NWA Chicago's Super Smashing Halloween event at Studio One Events in Highland Park, Illinois. On October 26, 2024, Haley J won a three way way NWA World Women's Championship #1 contendership elimination match in Tampa, Florida against Kylie Paige and Natalia Markova during the Samhain 2 event. On December 14, 2024, during the Looks That Kill event at the Dothan Civic Center in Dothan, Alabama, Haley J challenged Kenzie Paige for the NWA World Women's Championship.

On January 24, 2025, Haley J made her NWA Kross Fire Wrestling debut when she fought Kylie Paige in a street fight during the 20 Years of Kick Ass event at the Sevierville Civic Center in Sevierville, Tennessee. On October 18, 2025, during the NWA Samhain: Part 3 event at the Center Stage Theater in Atlanta, Georgia, Haley J fought against Sirena Veil. On April 4, 2026, during the Crockett Cup, Haley J competed in the Mildred Burke invitational gauntlet against Tiffany Nieves, Kenzie Paige, Kylie Paige, Shay KarMichael, Gretta, and Morgan Mercy.

=== Juggalo Championship Wrestling (2025–present) ===
On May 20, 2025, Haley J made her Juggalo Championship Wrestling (JCW) debut when she challenged Alice Crowley for the JCW Women's Championship during a taping for the June 19, 2025 episode of JCW Lunacy at the Spartanburg Memorial Auditorium in Spartanburg, South Carolina. Haley J continued to wrestle during various tapings in May 2025 including a JCW Women's Championship match against Crowley in which Haley lost by disqualification at the Fillmore in Charlotte, North Carolina on May 21, 2025, during a taping for the June 26, 2025 episode of JCW Lunacy, May 23, 2025 in a six-wrestler tag team match in which she teamed with the Brothers of Funstruction (Yabo The Clown and Ruffo The Clown) against Alice Crowley and the Backseat Boyz (Tommy Grayson and JP Grayson), a three-way match for the JCW Women's Championship in which she was accompanied by 2 Tuff Tony to fight against Christina Marie and Alice Crowley during a taping for the July 10, 2025 episode of JCW Lunacy at the Sharkey's Event Center in Liverpool, New York on May 25, 2025, and another JCW Women's Championship match in which she challenge Alice Crowley during a taping for the July 31, 2025 episode of Lunacy at the Rave/Eagles Club in Milwaukee, Wisconsin on June 21, 2025. On July 17, 2025, during the GCW x JCW Showcase Showdown: The Violence is Right pay-per-view at the Majestic Theatre in Detroit, Michigan,

Haley J competed in a four-way match for the JCW Women's Championship against the champion Alice Crowley, Christina Marie, and Rachel Armstrong. On August 1, 2025, during the Powder Keg pay-per-view at the Williams Center in Rutherford, New Jersey, Haley J competed in a JCW Women's Championship #1 contendership match against Christina Marie. During the JCW vs. GCW: The 2 Day War pay-per-view, Haley J competed in another four-way match for the JCW Women's Championship against the champion Alice Crowley, Brooke Havok, and Priscilla Kelly. On the 49th episode of Lunacy during the main event, 2 Tuff Tony defended the JCW Heavyweight Championship against Kerry Morton. However, Haley J and her tag team partner Luscious Lawrence attacked Tony and resulted in the match being declared a no contest. On September 18, 2025, Haley J won the JCW Women's Championship after defeating Alice Crowley during the 2 Tuff Country event at The ArenA in Jeffersonville, Indiana.

== Championships and accomplishments ==
- IWA Mid-South
  - IWA Mid-South Women's Championship (2 times)
- Ohio Valley Wrestling
  - OVW Women's Championship (3 times)
- Nickel City Wrestling
  - NCW Women's Championship (1 time)
- Atomic Legacy Wrestling
  - ALW Women's Championship (1 time)
- International Wrestling Network
  - IWN Women's Championship (1 time)
- Women of Wrestling
  - WOW World Tag Team Championship (2 times as Holly Swag with Big Red Betty as the Mother Truckers and with Pink Penelope as the Fab 4)
- Reality of Wrestling
  - ROW Women's Championship (1 time)
- Juggalo Championship Wrestling
  - JCW Women's Championship (1 time)
