= IWA Mid-South Women's Championship =

Professional wrestling women's championship

- The original NWA Midwest Women's Championship belt (2004–2011)

Details
- Promotion: IWA Mid-South
- Date established: May 30, 2004
- Current champion: Thunderkitty
- Date won: July 15, 2021

Other names
- NWA Midwest/IWA Mid-South Women's Championship (2004 - 2005); IWA Mid-South Women's Championship (2005 - present)
Statistics
- First champion: Lacey
- Most reigns: Mickie Knuckles (3 reigns)
- Longest reign: Mickie Knuckles (528 days)
- Shortest reign: Lukas Jacobs (12 days)
- Oldest champion: Jessie Belle Smothers (35 years, 311 days)
- Youngest champion: Alice Crowley
- Heaviest champion: Chuck Taylor (209 lb)

The IWA Mid-South Women's Championship is a women's professional wrestling title owned and promoted by the Independent Wrestling Association Mid-South professional wrestling promotion. The title was created on May 30, 2004, in a one night tournament titled "Volcano Girls" at the National Guard Armory in Hammond, Indiana co-promoted by IWA Mid-South Wrestling and NWA Midwest Wrestling. Until June 17, 2005, it was a joint championship with the NWA Midwest Women's Championship and was known as the NWA Midwest/IWA Mid-South Women's Championship. The championship is usually won and defended by women, although two men have once won the title such as Chuck Taylor and Lukas Jacobs. There have been a total of 24 reigns held between 17 distinctive champions and one vacancy. The current champion is Thunderkitty who is in her second reign.

== Title history ==
On May 30, 2004, Lacey defeated Daizee Haze and Mercedes Martinez in a three-way elimination match in tournament final to become the inaugural champion.

Key
No.	Overall reign number
Reign	Reign number for the specific champion
Days	Number of days held
+	Current reign is changing daily

No.	Champion	Championship change			Reign statistics		Notes	Ref.
No.	Champion	Date	Event	Location	Reign	Days	Notes	Ref.
NWA Midwest/IWA Mid-South Women's Championship
1	Lacey	May 30, 2004	Volcano Girls	Hammond, IN	1	110	Lacey defeated Daizee Haze and Mercedes Martinez in a three-way elimination match in tournament final to become the inaugural champion.	
2	Mercedes Martinez	September 17, 2004	2004 Ted Petty Invitational	Highland, IN	1	120		
3	Ariel	January 5, 2005	New England Championship Wrestling live event	Framingham, MA	1	28	This was a three-way match, also involving Hayley Skye.	
4	Daizee Haze	February 12, 2005	House show	Highland, IN	1	84	This was a six-way elimination match, also involving Cheerleader Melissa, Mickie Knuckles, MsChif and Sara Del Rey.	
5	MsChif	May 7, 2005	House show	Streamwood, IL	1	35	This live event was promoted by Ed Chuman.	
IWA Mid-South Women's Championship
6	Mickie Knuckles	June 11, 2005	House show	Philadelphia, PA	1	160	This was a three-way match, also involving Allison Danger. On June 17, 2005, in Midlothian, Illinois, Ed Chuman, NWA Midwest promoter, declares that a supposed title change on June 11 (an IWA Mid-South event in Philadelphia, Pennsylvania, where Mickie Knuckles defeated Danger and MsChif in a three-way match to become champion in IWA's eyes) is invalid due to the match not being sanctioned by the NWA. The two titles then split into separate entities as IWA Mid-South promoter Ian Rotten recognized Knuckles as champion with her win over MsChif. Knuckles is thus the first strictly IWA Mid-South Women's Champion, and is where that portion of the title lineage begins.	
7	Hailey Hatred	November 18, 2005	IWA Mid-South King of the Death Matches 2005	Plainfield, IN	1	82		
8	Mickie Knuckles	February 8, 2006	IWA East Coast a Need to Bleed 2006	South Charleston, WV	2	528		
9	Chuck Taylor	July 21, 2007	IWA Mid-South Bad Blood Rising	Joliet, IL	1	14	Taylor's IWA Mid-South Heavyweight Championship was also on the line. He became the first male wrestler to hold the title.	
10	Mickie Knuckles	August 4, 2007	IWA Mid-South Extreme Heaven 2007	Plainfield, IN	3	272	This was a no-countout falls count anywhere match.	
11	Daizee Haze	May 2, 2008	IWA Mid-South Fan Appreciation Night	Indianapolis, IN	2	218	This was a three-way match, also involving Sara Del Rey.	
—	Vacated	December 6, 2008	Candido Cup 2008	Joliet, IL	—	—	Ian Rotten announced that all titles are being done away with in IWA except for the IWA World Heavyweight and Light Heavyweight Titles.	
12	Shotzi Blackheart	April 19, 2018	IWA Mid-South Miss Independent	Memphis, IN	1	182	Blackheart defeated Kikyo in the tournament final to win the reactivated championship.	
13	Amazing Maria	October 18, 2018	IWA Mid-South 22nd Anniversary Show	Jeffersonville, IN	1	65	This was a falls count anywhere match.	
14	Lukas Jacobs	December 22, 2018	IWA Mid-South Big Ass Christmas Bash 2018	Jeffersonville, IN	1	12	Jacobs became the second male wrestler to hold the championship.	
15	Max the Impaler	January 3, 2019	IWA Mid-South RassleKingdom	Jeffersonville, IN	1	43		
16	Amazing Maria	February 15, 2019	IWA Mid-South Heartbreak 2019	Jeffersonville, IN	2	15	This was a three-way match, also involving Thunderkitty.	
17	Nevaeh	March 2, 2019	IWA Mid-South in Like a Lion 2019	Jeffersonville, IN	1	82		
18	Max the Impaler	May 23, 2019	IWA Mid-South Payback, Pain and Agony 2019	Jeffersonville, IN	2	49		
19	Alice Crowley	July 11, 2019	IWA Mid-South Welcome to the Danger Zone	Jeffersonville, IN	1	238		
20	Haley J	March 5, 2020	IWA Mid-South Let The Madness Begin	Jeffersonville, IN	1	233	This was a tables match.	
21	Thunderkitty	October 24, 2020	IWA Mid-South 24th Anniversary Show: We Are IWA	Indianapolis, IN	1	103		
22	Haley J	February 4, 2021	IWA Mid-South Opportunity Knocks	Indianapolis, IN	2	94	This was a four-way match also involving Amazing Maria and Malia Hosaka.	
23	Jessie Belle Smothers	May 9, 2021	This One's For Donna	Jeffersonville, IN	1	67	This was a four-way match also involving Alice Crowley and Thunderkitty.	
24	Thunderkitty	July 15, 2021	House show	Jeffersonville, IN	2	334		
—	Deactivated	June 14, 2022	—	—	—	—	The promotion ceased operations.	

== Combined reigns ==
As of August 30, 2026.

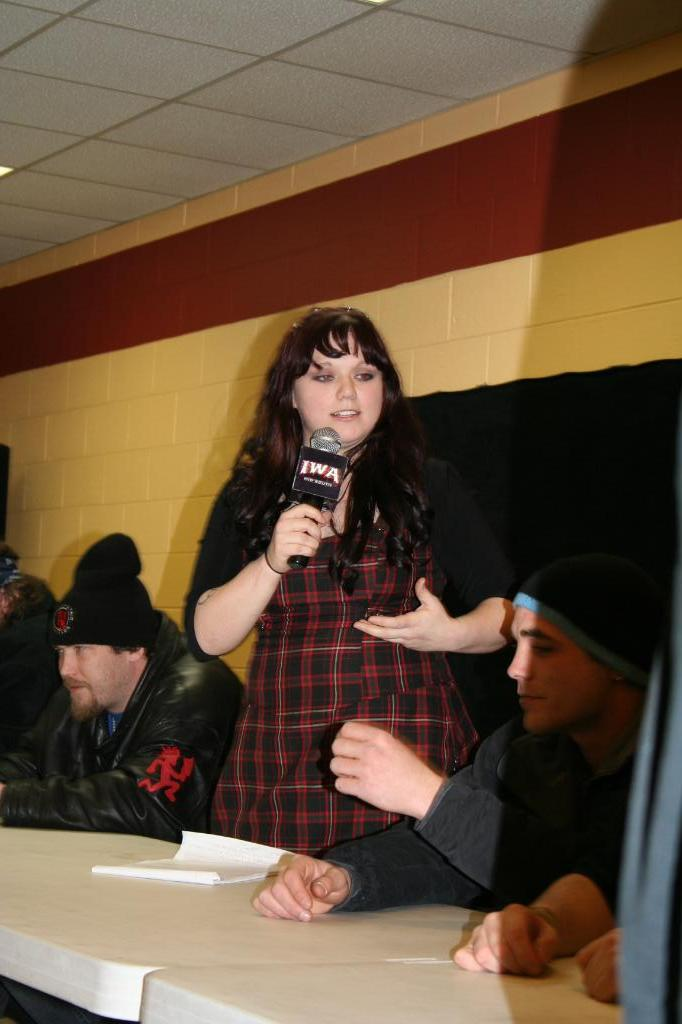
Record making three-time champion Mickie Knuckles; she has the longest singular reign for the title at 528 days, and she also has the longest combined reign at 960 days

†	Indicates the current champion

Rank	Wrestler	No. of reigns	Combined days
1	Mickie Knuckles	3	960
3	Thunderkitty	2	334
2	Haley J	2	327
4	Daizee Haze	2	302
5	Alice Crowley	1	238
6	Shotzi Blackheart	1	182
7	Mercedes Martinez	1	120
8	Lacey	1	110
9	Nevaeh	1	109
10	Hailey Hatred	1	82
11	Amazing Maria	2	80
12	MsChif	1	35
13	Ariel	1	28
14	Max the Impaler	2	92
15	Jessie Belle Smothers	1	67
16	Chuck Taylor	1	14
17	Lukas Jacobs	1	12

== See also ==
- Independent Wrestling Association Mid-South
