= Dani Mo =

American professional wrestler

- Mo in June 2025

Personal information
- Born: September 24, 1998 (age 28) Bethel Park, Pennsylvania, U.S.

Professional wrestling career
- Ring names: Dani; Dani Mo
- Billed height: 5 ft 6 in (168 cm)
- Billed weight: 134 lb (61 kg)
- Debut: May 27, 2017

Danielle Morrison better known by her ring name Dani Mo (born September 24, 1998) is an American professional wrestler. She is best known for her work in the independent circuit. Particularly with Ohio Valley Wrestling (OVW) where she was the OVW Women's Champion and Juggalo Championship Wrestling (JCW) where she is the current JCW Women's Champion. She has also worked with All Elite Wrestling (AEW) and their sister promotion Ring of Honor (ROH), Game Changer Wrestling (GCW), Revolution Pro Wrestling (RevPro), Coastal Championship Wrestling (CCW), Pro-Wrestling: EVE (EVE), and World Wrestling Entertainment (WWE).

== Professional wrestling career ==
=== Independent circuit (2017–present) ===
On May 27, 2017, Dani Mo made her professional wrestling debut at Pro Wrestling Empire's (PWE) Collateral Damage event at the Zembo Shrine in Harrisburg, Pennsylvania when she fought against Facade. After the event, Mo would take a two-year hiatus from in-ring appearances until October 25, 2019, when she made her Atomic Championship Wrestling (ACW) debut at the promotion's Monster Mash Ball at the Reverb in Reading, Pennsylvania in which she wrestled in a three-way match for the Rogue Women Warriors Championship against champion Layna Lennox and Lady Frost.

On January 11, 2024, Mo defended the JCW Women's Championship against Ricki Morris at Divine Pro Wrestling's (DPW) Endless Waltz event in Wyandotte, Michigan. During the first OnlyWrestlers event on March 20, 2025, at the Vermont Hollywood in Los Angeles, California, Mo defended the JCW Women's Championship against Mighty Mayra and Tessa Blanchard in a three-way match.

=== Ohio Valley Wrestling (2021–2022) ===
During the May 6, 2021 edition of OVW TV, Dani Mo made her Ohio Valley Wrestling (OVW) debut when she competed in a three-way OVW Women's Championship #1 contendership match against Arie Alexander and Dream Girl Ellie. On June 26, 2021, during the Chained Carnage pay-per-view, Mo won the OVW Women's Championship after defeating Haley J. However, on the following OVW TV episode on July 1, 2021, Mo lost the title to Haley J.

=== WWE (2021) ===
On the August 29, 2022 episode of Monday Night Raw, Dani Mo made her WWE debut at the PPG Paints Arena in Pittsburgh, Pennsylvania in which she teamed up with Katie Arquette and Kayla Sparks in a six-woman tag team match against Bianca Belair, Alexa Bliss, and Asuka. This however would be her only WWE match.

=== All Elite Wrestling and Ring of Honor (2021–2024) ===
On October 6, 2021, Dani Mo made her All Elite Wrestling (AEW) debut during a taping for the October 11, 2021 episode of Dark Elevation at the Liacouras Center in Philadelphia, Pennsylvania in which she fought Tay Conti. On December 22, 2021, during the taping for the December 27, 2021 episode of Dark: Elevation at the Greensboro Coliseum in Greensboro, North Carolina, Mo fought against Thunder Rosa.

=== Game Changer Wrestling (2021–2025) ===
On January 30, 2021, Dani Mo made her Game Changer Wrestling debut during the Fight Forever: After Hours event at the Voltage Lounge in Philadelphia, Pennsylvania in which she fought Facade. On March 30, 2025, during the Amerikaz Most Wanted pay-per-view, Mo teamed up with the Brothers of Funstruction (Yabo The Clown and Ruffo The Clown) in a six-wrestler Juggalo Championship Wrestling exhibition match against the Backseat Boyz (JP Grayson and Tommy Grayson) and The Wraith.

On April 20, 2025, during the Joey Janela's Spring Break: Clusterf**k Forever pay-per-view, Mo, Mickie Knuckles, 2 Tuff Tony, the Brothers of Funstruction (Yabo The Clown and Ruffo The Clown), and the Backseat Boyz (Tommy Grayson and JP Grayson) entered into the Clusterf**k Battle Royal representing JCW in which they had taken control of the ring for a brief period before Matt Tremont, Bam Sullivan, Big Joe, Lou Nixon, Dr. Redacted, and John Wayne Murdoch entered as Team GCW and would brawl backstage during the match.

=== International promotions (2023–present) ===
On July 22, 2023, Dani Mo made her international debut when she competed in Smash Wrestling's CANUSA Classic at the Western Fair District in London, Ontario, Canada in which she fought against Seleziya Sparx. On November 19, 2023, Mo teamed up Facade as the Neon Blondes in a tag team match against Nikita and Shane Sabre during Smash Wrestling's High Voltage event.

On November 7, 2025, Mo made her United Kingdom wrestling debut when she fought against Safire Reed in a SHE-1 2026 qualifying match during Pro-Wrestling: EVE's Elite Encounters event. On November 11, 2025, Mo made her RevPro debut when she fought against Riho, Alexxis Falcon, and Kanji in a four-way match.

=== Juggalo Championship Wrestling (2024–present) ===
On May 3, 2024, Dani Mo made her Juggalo Championship Wrestling debut during the Juggalos Strike Back event at the Newport Music Hall in Columbus, Ohio which was the first set of tapings for the first four episodes of JCW Lunacy in which she first fought Alice Crowley on the first and third episodes which aired on August 28, 2024, and September 11, 2024, respectively. On the first night of the Train of Terror Tour on October 23, 2024, at Brooklyn Bowl in Nashville, Tennessee, Mo teamed up with Facade in a tag team match against Mickie Knuckles and Super Beast.

On October 30, 2024, during the Devil's Night pay-per-view at the Majestic Theatre in Detroit, Mo became the inaugural JCW Women's Champion when she won a battle royal which featured Heather Blue, Leela Hall, Mickie Knuckles, Pepper Pryde, Randi West, and Rikki Morris. On December 21, 2024, during the Big Ballas Holiday Party, Mo competed teamed up with Facade as the Neon Blondes in a four-way match for the JCW Tag Team Championship against the defending champions The Backseat Boyz (JP Grayson and Tommy Grayson), the Brothers of Funstruction (Yabo The Clown and Ruffo The Clown), and Breyer Wellington and Jeeves.

On April 26, 2025, during the Hella Pain & Diamond Rain Tour, Mo lost the JCW Women's Championship to Alice Crowley in a three-way match which also featured Sonny Kiss.

On April 17, 2026, Mo teamed up with Alice Crowley in a tag team match for the JCW Women's Championship during the Strangle-Mania: Viva Las Violence pay-per-view at Horseshoe Las Vegas in Paradise, Nevada. However, Crowley lost the championship to J-Rod.

On May 24, 2026, during the final night of the Mayday on the Front Lines tour in Lansing, Michigan, Mo won the JCW Women's Championship for the second time after defeating J-Rod in a ladder match

== Championships and accomplishments ==
- Ohio Valley Wrestling
  - OVW Women's Championship (1 time)
- Pennsylvania Premiere Wrestling
  - PPW Women's Championship (3 times)
- New South Wrestling (1 time)
  - New South Women's Championship
- Old School Championship Wrestling
  - OSCW Women's Championship (1 time)
- Immortal Championship Wrestling
  - ICW Women's Championship (1 time)
- Juggalo Championship Wrestling
  - JCW Women's Championship (2 times, current)
- Battleground Championship Wrestling
  - BCW Women's Championship (1 time)
- Remix Pro Wrestling
  - Remix Pro Fury Championship (1 time, current)
- UPW Pro Wrestling
  - UPW Women's Championship (1 time, current)
- Voltage Wrestling
  - Joule Grand Championship (1 time, current)
