= J-Rod (wrestler) =

American professional wrestler

Jessica Roden
Personal information
- Born: Jessica Roden; October 11, 1992 (age 34) Ohio, U.S.
- Relatives: Lisa Roden (mother); Mark Roden (father); Lars Sullivan (cousin)

Professional wrestling career
- Ring names: J-Rod; Jessica Roden; Nikki Nashville
- Billed height: 5 ft 10 in (178 cm)
- Billed weight: 161 lb (73 kg)
- Trained by: Black Pearl (KnokX Pro Wrestling Academy); Rikishi
- Debut: July 16, 2022

Jessica Roden (born October 11, 1992), known by her ring name J-Rod (shortened from her real name), is an American professional wrestler. She performs on the independent circuit – predominantly for Ohio Valley Wrestling (OVW), and Juggalo Championship Wrestling (JCW). She has also competed in the 2026 reboot of American Gladiators under the name "Supernova".

== Early life ==
Jessica Roden was born on October 11, 1992, to Lisa and Mark Roden. Her mother Lisa is from Dublin, Ireland and her father Mark is an ex-professional wrestler and uncle of WWE superstar Lars Sullivan.

== Professional wrestling career ==
=== All Elite Wrestling / Ring of Honor (2022–2024) ===
On July 16, 2022, J-Rod made her wrestling debut during a taping of AEW Dark at Universal Studios Florida in a non-title match against Mercedes Martinez. Her debut match aired as the July 19, 2022 episode of AEW Dark. On March 3, 2023, J-Rod competed in her first tag team match during a taping for the March 6, 2023 episode of AEW Dark: Elevation at the Cow Palace in Daly City, California, when she teamed up with Sandra Moone against Marina Shafir and Nyla Rose.

On February 7, 2024, J-Rod made her Ring of Honor debut competed in a tournament to determine the #1 contender for the ROH Women's World Television Championship at the Footprint Center in Phoenix, Arizona. Her opponent was Queen Aminata however she would not advance the second round.

=== Independent circuit (2022–present) ===
On December 3, 2022, J-Rod made her independent wrestling debut during Future Stars of Wrestling's (FSW) Futureshock in Las Vegas, Nevada, when she competed in a triple threat match against Taniya and Alice Blair. J-Rod also made an appearance during a taping for the United Wrestling Network's (UWN) Championship Wrestling program in Irvine, California, when she fought Candy Girl.

On October 7, 2023, J-Rod made her New Japan Pro-Wrestling (NJPW) debut during the second NJPW Academy Showcase when she teamed up with Viva Van to take on Johnnie Robbie and Trish Adora.

=== Tokyo Joshi Pro Wrestling (2025–present) ===
On November 1, 2025, J-Rod made her Japan wrestling debut when she fought against Kira Summer during Tokyo Joshi Pro Wrestling's Autumn Victory In Shinjuku Vol. 2 in Tokyo. On November 9, 2025, J-Rod challenged Miu Watanabe for the TJPW Princess of Princess Championship in the main event of All Rise '25 at Korakuen Hall.

On April 11, 2026, J-Rod made her Canadian wrestling debut when she teamed up with Miu Watanabe in a tag team match against Wakana Uehara and Yuki Arai during Vancouver Premiere at the Hastings Racecourse & Casino in Vancouver, British Columbia, Canada. The following night, she teamed up with Sakura Hattori to take on Suzume and Yuki Arai.

On April 16, 2026, during the Palms Slam Fest in Las Vegas, J-Rod fought Yuki Arai for the TJPW Princess of Princess Championship in her WrestleMania weekend debut.

=== Juggalo Championship Wrestling (2026–present) ===
On January 18, 2026, J-Rod made her debut on a taping for the February 5, 2026 episode of JCW Lunacy in Denver, Colorado, when she attacked JCW Women's Champion Haley J backstage. Haley J called J-Rod out and the two proceeded to brawl in the ring.

On the February 13, 2026 episode of JCW Lunacy, J-Rod fought Haley J's mother, Amazing Maria. After defeating Maria, J-Rod requested on-screen women's division showrunner Alice Crowley to book a match between her and Dani Mo. Mo and J-Rod fought each other the following week's episode in a backlot brawl.

On April 18, 2026, during the Strangle-Mania: Viva Las Violence pay-per-view at Horseshoe Las Vegas in Paradise, Nevada, J-Rod teamed up with Nyla Rose against JCW Women's Champion Alice Crowley and Dani Mo in a tag team match for the JCW Women's Championship in which the first to successfully pin would win the title. J-Rod secured the winning pin over Mo, becoming the new JCW Women's Champion.

== Championships and accomplishments ==
- Arizona Wrestling Federation
  - AWF Women's Championship (1 time)
- Ohio Valley Wrestling
  - OVW Women's Championship (3 times, current)
- Venue Wrestling Entertainment
  - VWE Women's Championship (1 time)
- Juggalo Championship Wrestling
  - JCW Women's Championship (1 time)
