= Alice Crowley =

American wrestler (born 2001)

- Crowley in June 2025

Personal information
- Born: November 20, 2002 (age 24) Indianapolis, Indiana, U.S.

Professional wrestling career
- Ring names: Alice Crowley; Alice Oyl; Big Al
- Billed from: Indianapolis, Indiana
- Trained by: Randi West
- Debut: October 6, 2018

Alice Fisher, better known by her ring name Alice Crowley, is an American professional wrestler. She is best known for her work on the independent circuit. Particularly with Ohio Valley Wrestling (OVW), IWA Mid-South where she previously held the IWA Mid-South Women's Championship, Xtreme Pro Wrestling (XPW), Xtreme Championship Federation, and Juggalo Championship Wrestling (JCW) where she previously held the JCW Women's Championship. She has also wrestled in Maple Leaf Pro Wrestling (MLP), All Elite Wrestling (AEW), Tokyo Joshi Pro-Wrestling (TJPW), and Ring of Honor along with competing in the slap fighting promotion Power Slap owned by Ultimate Fighting Championship chief executive officer Dana White.

== Professional wrestling career ==
=== Independent circuit (2018–present) ===
On November 22, 2018, Crowley made her pro wrestling debut during Girl Fight Wrestling's Midnight Girl Fight 2: Howdy Pilgrim at The ArenA in Jeffersonville, Indiana where she fought her trainer Randi West. On August 25, 2019, Crowley won her first championship when she and Billie Starkz defeated the Bad Dude Gang (Duke and Gnarls Garvin) to win the Grindhouse Pro Tag Team Championship.

=== IWA Mid-South (2019–2022) ===
On June 20, 2019, Alice Crowley made her IWA Mid-South debut during the This is Us show where she defeated Thunderkitty. In her fourth match, Crowley won the IWA Mid-South Women's Championship by defeating Max the Impaler.

=== Ohio Valley Wrestling (2020–2024) ===
On August 18, 2020, during an OVW TV taping, Alice Crowley made her Ohio Valley Wrestling debut where she fought Kayla Kassidy, Becky Idol, Billie Starkz, and Haley J for the vacant OVW Women's Championship in a scramble match.

=== All Elite Wrestling and Ring of Honor (2021–present) ===
On November 24, 2021, Crowley made her AEW debut when she teamed up with Missa Kate in a tag team match against TayJay (Anna Jay and Tay Conti) at a taping for Dark: Elevation held at the Wintrust Arena in Chicago, Illinois. She also teamed up with Freya States against the Baddies (Kiera Hogan and Leila Grey) on August 3, 2022, during the taping for the August 8, 2022 episode of Dark: Elevation. On August 31, 2022, she wrestled in her first AEW singles match when she fought Julia Hart.

On August 19, 2023, Crowley, made her Ring of Honor debut when she fought Emi Sakura during a Ring of Honor Wrestling taping. On March 27, 2026, Crowley challenged Red Velvet for the ROH World Television Championship at the Global Wars Canada cross-promotional pay-per-view with Maple Leaf Pro Wrestling at St. Clair College in Windsor, Ontario, Canada.

=== Juggalo Championship Wrestling (2024–present) ===
On May 3, 2024, Crowley made her Juggalo Championship Wrestling debut during the premiere taping of their weekly show JCW Lunacy in which she fought Dani Mo on the first and third episodes of the show. On November 30, 2024, Crowley challenged Dani Mo for the JCW Women's Championship during the Spanks Givin pay-per-view in Wyandotte, Michigan.

On April 26, 2025, during the Hella Pain & Diamond Rain Tour, Crowley won the JCW Women's Championship in a three-way match against Dani Mo and Sonny Kiss at the Cleveland Masonic Temple in Cleveland, Ohio. On July 17, 2025, during GCW x JCW Showcase Showdown: The Violence is Right, Crowley defended the title in a four-way match against Haley J, Christina Marie, and Rachel Armstrong.

On September 18, 2025, during the 2 Tuff Country special at The ArenA in Jeffersonville, Indiana, Crowley lost the JCW Women's Championship to Haley J. On March 20, 2026, during the March Massacre Tour, Crowley won back the title at the Harpos Concert Theatre in Detroit, Michigan. On April 17, 2026, at the Strangle-Mania: Viva Las Violence pay-per-view in Paradise, Nevada, Crowley lost the title to J-Rod in a tag team match with Dani Mo where she fought J-Rod and Nyla Rose in which whoever secured the winning pinfall would win the title.

=== International promotions (2025–present) ===
On March 8, 2025, Alice Crowley made her international wrestling debut when she teamed up with Zach Thompson to take on Kris Chambers and Taylor Rising in a mixed tag team match during Top Tier Wrestling's Bring The Bull at the Hamilton Convention Centre in Hamilton, Ontario, Canada.

On October 12, 2025, Crowley made her Japan debut when she teamed up with MLW World Women's Featherweight Champion Shoko Nakajima against TJPW International Princess Champion Arisu Endo and Haru Kazashiro during Autumn Victory In Shinjuku Vol. 1 at Shinjuku FACE in Tokyo, Japan. Before the match, Crowley signed a match contract with Endo to challenge her for the TJPW International Princess Championship on October 18, 2025, during Additional Attack '25 at Korakuen Hall.

In addition to her Maple Leaf Pro Wrestling debut at Global Wars Canada, Crowley teamed up with Mystery Wrestling owner Evil Uno in a tag team match against Kris Chambers and Taylor Rising during the Uprising pay-per-view on March 28, 2026.

=== National Wrestling Alliance (2026–present) ===
Crowley made her NWA debut at Hard Times 6 on June 6, 2026, teaming up with Sirena Veil to challenge Pretty Empowered (Kenzie Paige and Kylie Paige) for the NWA World Women's Tag Team Championship.

== Championships and accomplishments ==
- Divine Pro Wrestling
  - DPW Championship (1 time)
- Grindhouse Pro Wrestling
  - Grindhouse Pro Tag Team Championship (1 time) with Billie Starkz
- Mega Championship Wrestling
  - MEGA Baddies Championship (1 time)
- Summit Pro
  - Summit Pro Championship (1 time)
- IWA Mid-South
  - IWA Mid-South Women's Championship (2 times)
  - IWA Mid-South Tag Team Championship (1 time) – with Becky Idol
- Juggalo Championship Wrestling
  - JCW Women's Championship (2 times)
- Pro Wrestling Epic
  - PWE Women's Champion (1 time)
- KAOS Wrestling Organization
  - KAOS Women's Champion (1 time)
