= JCW Women's Championship =

Women's professional wrestling championship

Details
- Promotion: Juggalo Championship Wrestling
- Date established: October 30, 2024
- Current champion: Dani Mo
- Date won: May 24, 2026
Statistics
- First champion: Dani Mo
- Most reigns: 2 reigns: Alice Crowley; Dani Mo
- Longest reign: Haley J (183 days)
- Shortest reign: Alice Crowley (2nd reign, 28 days)
- Oldest champion: J-Rod (33 years, 189 days)
- Youngest champion: Alice Crowley (22 years, 157 days)
- Heaviest champion: J-Rod (161 lb (73 kg))
- Lightest champion: Haley J (124 lb (56 kg))

The JCW Women's Championship is a women's professional wrestling championship in Juggalo Championship Wrestling (JCW). The current champion is Dani Mo, who is in her second reign. She won the title by defeating J-Rod in a ladder match on the June 18, 2026, episode of Lunacy. The event was taped on May 24.

== Reigns ==
As of November 20, 2026, there have been six reigns among four champions. Dani Mo was the inaugural champion. Mo and Alice Crowley are tied for the most reigns at two. Haley J has the longest reign at 183 days, but Mo's first reign is officially recognized as the longest reign at 211 days. Crowley's second reign is the shortest at 28 days (officially recognized as nine days). J-Rod is the oldest champion, who won the title at 33 years and 188 days old, while Crowley is the youngest champion, who won the title at 22 years and 157 days old.

Dani Mo is the current champion in her second reign. She won the title by defeating J-Rod in a ladder match on the June 18, 2026, episode of Lunacy in Lansing, Michigan. The event was taped on May 24.

Key
No.	Overall reign number
Reign	Reign number for the specific champion
Days	Number of days held
Days recog.	Number of days held recognized by the promotion

No.	Champion	Championship change			Reign statistics			Notes	Ref.
No.	Champion	Date	Event	Location	Reign	Days	Days recog.	Notes	Ref.
1	Dani Mo	October 30, 2024	Devil's Night	Detroit, MI	1	178	211	Mo defeated Heather Blue, Leela Hall, Mickie Knuckles, Pepper Pryde, Randi West, and Rikki Morris in a battle royal to become the inaugural champion.	
2	Alice Crowley	April 26, 2025	Lunacy	Cleveland, OH	1	146	154	This three-way match also featured Sonny Kiss. Aired on tape delay on May 29.	
3	Haley J	September 19, 2025	Lunacy: 2 Tuff Country	Jeffersonville, IN	1	183	161	Aired on tape delay on October 30.	
4	Alice Crowley	March 21, 2026	Lunacy	Detroit, MI	2	28	9	Aired on tape delay on April 9.	
5	J-Rod	April 18, 2026	Strangle-Mania: Viva Las Violence	Paradise, NV	1	36	61	J-Rod and Nyla Rose defeated previous champion Alice Crowley and Dani Mo in a tag team match, where Crowley defended the title. J-Rod won the title by scoring the pinfall.	
6	Dani Mo	May 24, 2026	Lunacy Mayday! On the Front Lines	Lansing, MI	2	180+	155+	This was a ladder match. Aired on tape delay on June 18.	

== Combined reigns ==
As of November 20, 2026.

†	Indicates the current champion

Rank	Wrestler	No. of reigns	Combined days	
Rank	Wrestler	No. of reigns	Actual	Recognized by JCW
1	Dani Mo †	2	358+	366+
2	Haley J	1	183	161
3	Alice Crowley	2	174	163
4	J-Rod	1	36	61
