= JCW Lunacy =

American professional wrestling television program

- Logo
- Genre: Professional wrestling
- Created by: Juggalo Championship Wrestling; Insane Clown Posse
- Presented by: Joe Dombrowski (play-by-play commentator); Mark Roberts (color commentator); Veda Scott (color commentator)
- Starring: JCW roster
- Opening theme: "Fight Club" feat. Necro and Esham by Violent J
- Country of origin: United States
- Original language: English
- No. of episodes: 108

Production
- Producer: Violent J
- Camera setup: Multicamera setup
- Running time: 60–120 minutes
- Production companies: Psychopathic Sports; Legacey Media Group

Original release
- Network: YouTube; Facebook
- Release: August 28, 2024 – present

JCW Lunacy is a professional wrestling streaming television program produced by Juggalo Championship Wrestling, an independent professional wrestling promotion owned by the Insane Clown Posse. The show first premiered on August 28, 2024 on the Psychopathic Records YouTube channel.

== History ==
On March 17, 2024, JCW announced the first tapings for their new show titled JCW Lunacy would take place on May 3, 2024 at the Newport Music Hall in Columbus, Ohio. Titled The Juggalos Strike Back, the show would feature various talent from the independent circuit, JCW's regular roster, All Elite Wrestling (AEW) talent, and talent from the National Wrestling Alliance (NWA). In addition to the premiere taping, JCW announced on May 20, 2024 that they would hold an additional taping at the Harpos Concert Theatre in Detroit, Michigan and would feature Matt Cardona and the debut of the Nu Backseat Boyz consisting of Tommy and JP Grayson with their manager Johnny Kashmere. On June 10, 2024, Juggalo Championship Wrestling announced that they would launch JCW Lunacy as a bi-weekly show and would feature talent from the National Wrestling Alliance (NWA), Major League Wrestling (MLW), Total Nonstop Action Wrestling (TNA), All Elite Wrestling (AEW), Lucha Libre AAA Worldwide (AAA), Big Japan Pro Wrestling (BJW), and the independent circuit alongside JCW's regular talent. However, the show's format would abruptly switch to a weekly format beginning on September 4, 2024.

The first tapings featured Manny Fresh and NWA play-by-play commentator Joe Galli on commentary and premiered on August 28, 2024. On the September 18, 2024 episode of JCW Lunacy, the Southern Six consisting of Kerry Morton and James Storm won the JCW Tag Team Championship after defeating the Brothers of Funstruction consisting of Yabo The Clown and Ruffo The Clown. On September 16, 2024, JCW announced their first pay-per-view event since 2024 titled the Devil's Night Creature Double Feature which would take place at the Majestic Theatre in Detroit, Michigan and would feature the Insane Clown Posse as the "Bitchin' Wild Bucks". On September 18, 2024, JCW announced that they would be part of the Train of Terror Tour which would consist of the Insane Clown Posse themselves, Wakko The Kidd, Monster Wolf, Ouija Macc, and Shaggy The Airhead and would lead up to the Insane Clown Posse's annual Halloween night event, Hallowicked at the Detroit Masonic Temple in Detroit, Michigan. On the October 16, 2024 episode of JCW Lunacy, the promotion would showcase two matches from the 2024 Gathering of the Juggalos at Legend Valley in Thornville, Ohio. The first one being a battle royal with the winner being crowned the inaugural JCW American Championship which Caleb Konley had won and the main event of Bloodymania 17 which consisted of Willie Mack defending the JCW Heavyweight Championship against Matt Cross. The first night of the Train of Terror tour which was streamed live on October 23, 2024 would see the debut of Pink Kane, a Kane parody played by Quinn Whittock who would later swap to Yellow Kane before becoming CoKane on the Devil's Night pay-per-view.

On the May 1, 2025 episode of JCW Lunacy which was taped during the Hella Pain & Diamond Rain Tour, Game Changer Wrestling World Champion Effy would make his debut for the promotion after Violent J challenged GCW to a "2 day war" at the 2025 Gathering of the Juggalos during GCW's Bad One pay-per-view on September 14, 2024. Several more GCW wrestlers would make appearances on Lunacy including Joey Janela, GCW Ultraviolent Champion Matt Tremont, Jimmy Lloyd, and Sonny Kiss. On the July 17, 2025 episode of JCW Lunacy, which would lead directly into Showcase Showdown: The Violence is Right, Mad Man Pondo would win the JCW Heavyweight Championship by defeating Kerry Morton.

On August 2, 2025 during JCW's Powder Keg pay-per-view in Rutherford, New Jersey, John Wayne Murdoch was set on fire during a match where he teamed with 1 Called Manders and Matt Tremont against the team of JCW Hall of Famers represented by 2 Tuff Tony, Mad Man Pondo, and Mickie Knuckles. At the end of the match, Murdoch would be set on fire after being suplexed through a burning table by Pondo. The match would be declared a no contest as a result. The stunt had forced him to be rushed to the hospital after the show. On the following live episode of JCW Lunacy on August 12, 2025 at the Gathering of the Juggalos, Violent J would announce that Mickie Knuckles and Mad Man Pondo would be suspended after the stunt and that Pondo would be pulled from his rematch with Matt Tremont for the JCW Heavyweight Championship. He would be replaced by 2 Tuff Tony who would challenge Tremont for the JCW Heavyweight Championship.

On September 11, 2025, Caleb Konley debuted Suicide character who had first made its wrestling debut in Total Nonstop Action Wrestling on a live episode of Lunacy from Dallas, Texas where he teamed up with Luigi Primo and Cocaine to take on the St. Claire Monster Corporation (Painful Paul, Kongo Kong, and Mr. Happy). The episode would also see the debut of Vampiro on JCW Lunacy as he would be a frequently featured member of the JCW roster and would also serve as a commentator. However, the broadcast suffered from several technical issues and was reshot in San Antonio, Texas.

On the October 24, 2025 episode of JCW Lunacy which was taped on September 17, 2025 at the Minglewood Hall in Memphis, Tennessee, talent from Memphis Wrestling would make their JCW debuts including the Disorderlies, Big John Dalton, Tim Bosby, Xya Wolf, Ray Sanders, Nyxx, and the Shocker. The main event would consist of 2 Tuff Tony defending the JCW Heavyweight Championship against former WWE ID wrestler Aaron Roberts. At the end of the match, Vampiro set up an ambush where he debuted the "Trifecta of Terror" which consisted of Mickie Knuckles and Mad Man Pondo who had been previously released from JCW amid the aftermath of Powder Keg.

During the 2 Tuff Country special, Matt Cardona challenged 2 Tuff Tony for the JCW Heavyweight Championship. In addition to the main event, the special also featured Haley J winning the JCW Women's Championship after defeating Alice Crowley and also featured Kerry Morton winning the JCW Battle Royal Championship in the 2 Tuff Country Rumble after throwing his father Ricky Morton over the top rope.

On the November 6, 2025 episode of Lunacy which was taped on October 20, 2025, Big Vito would make his JCW debut when he was revealed as the enforcer of a "mystery investor". Vito continued to make appearances and butt heads with Violent J until the debut of the "mystery investor". On October 26, 2025, Vince Russo, a high-profile pro wrestling writer and booker, was announced as an on-screen investor in JCW and would take up the role of the lead writer for the promotion.

During the Hallowicked taping on October 31, 2025 in Detroit, Matt Cardona defeated 2 Tuff Tony to win the JCW Heavyweight Championship. One day after the episode aired, it was announced that Matt Cardona had signed a contract with WWE and made his return on Friday Night SmackDown on January 2, 2026 and would vacate all of the championships he had held before signing including the JCW Heavyweight Championship.

== On-air personalities ==
=== Authority figures ===
Authority figures	Position	Dates	Notes
Violent J	Owner/Commissioner	August 28, 2024 - present	On-screen 100% owner since September 24, 2026
Vince Russo	Writer	November 27, 2025 - September 24, 2026	On-screen 50% owner until September 24, 2026
