= Sonny Kiss =

American professional wrestler (born 1993)

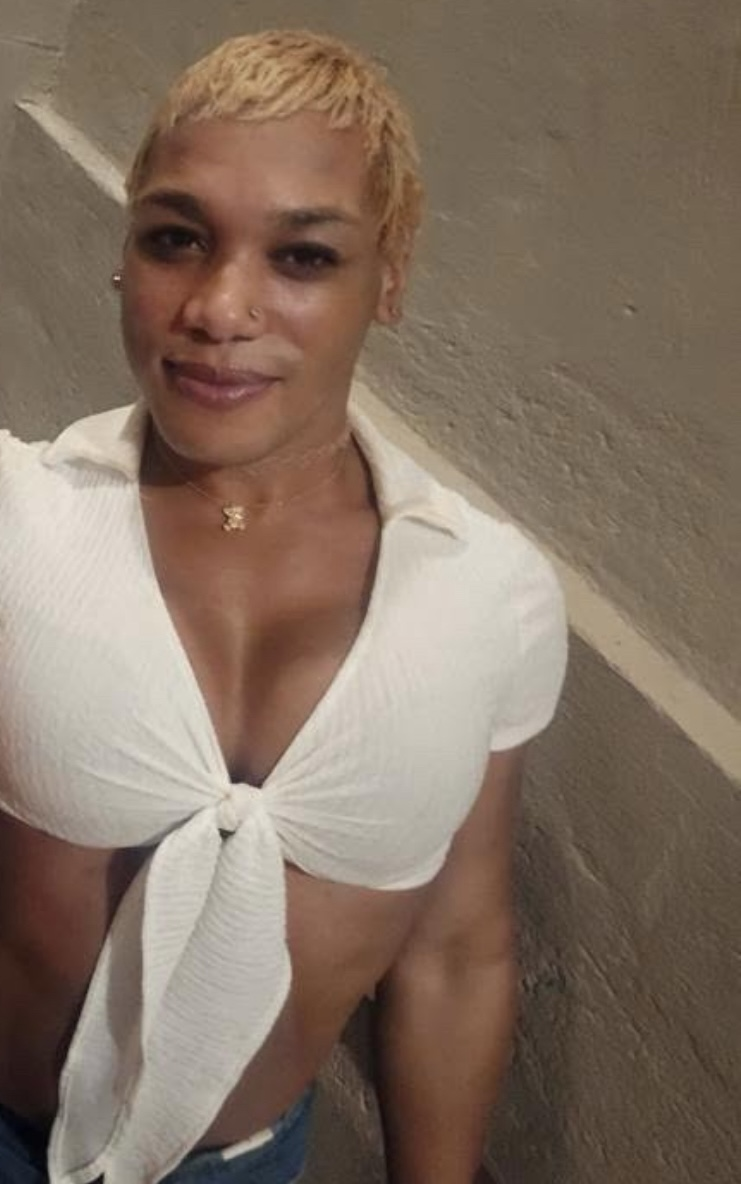
- Kiss in Feb 2025

Personal information
- Born: December 11, 1993 (age 32) Jersey City, New Jersey, U.S.
- Education: Bryan University (AA, BSc
- Relatives: Rodney Tate (uncle); Emmitt Smith (cousin)

Professional wrestling career
- Ring name(s): Sonny Kiss; XO Lishus
- Billed height: 5 ft 8 in (173 cm)
- Billed weight: 190 lb (86 kg)
- Billed from: Jersey City, New Jersey
- Trained by: Dustin Rhodes; Gino Caruso
- Debut: November 4, 2011 (valet) September 1, 2013 (wrestler)

Sunny Aziza Tate (born December 11, 1993), known professionally as Sonny Kiss, is an American professional wrestler, dancer, and professional wrestling manager. She currently performs on the independent circuit – predominantly with Game Changer Wrestling (GCW), Greektown Pro Wrestling, TNT Extreme Wrestling (TNT) and Juggalo Championship Wrestling (JCW). She was also previously signed with All Elite Wrestling (AEW) and has also worked with Impact Wrestling.

Sunny began her career in 2011 as a manager and became a pro wrestler two years later. Her first national exposure took place in 2018, when she began to work with Lucha Underground under the ring name XO Lishus.

== Early life ==
Sonny Kiss was born in Jersey City, New Jersey on December 11, 1993 and primarily resided in Downtown Jersey City's Liberty Harbor and Liberty State Park sections. Kiss attended a performing arts high school where she studied musical theatre as well as modern, ballet, jazz, contemporary, and hip hop dance. In 2011, Kiss attended the New Jersey Performing Arts Center (NJPAC)'s Summer Youth Performance Workshop (SYPW) modern dance program, which she successfully auditioned for. Later that year, Sonny won first place in dance at the Hudson County Teen Arts Festival. In 2014, she attended an audition for the NY Jets Flight Crew. Prior to becoming a professional wrestler, Kiss worked as a background dancer and choreographer for indie artists during her teen years.

== Professional wrestling career ==
=== Independent circuit; Lucha Underground (2011–2019) ===
Sonny Kiss initially debuted as a manager/valet in November 2011 at the age of 17. In September 2013, Kiss made her in-ring debut at East Coast Pro Wrestling in New Jersey. Sonny later appeared on several wrestling promotions on the independent circuit such as Full Impact Pro and Evolve.

On June 27, 2018, Kiss made her debut on Lucha Underground as XO Lishus by defeating Jack Evans. On August 8, 2018, she teamed up with Ivelisse in a losing effort to Joey Ryan and Jack Evans. Sonny later won the rematch against Jack Evans in a No Mas Match on August 29 of that year. On September 29, Kiss had her first title match teaming up with Ivelisse and Joey Ryan for the Trios Title, losing to the Reptile Tribe (Luchasaurus, Daga and Kobra Moon). The trio went on to lose to the Rabbit Tribe (Paul London, El Bunny and The White Rabbit) two weeks later. Kiss and Ivelisse competed for the Trios Title at Ultima Lucha Cuatro with Sammy Guevara as their third partner. The trio lost to the Reptile Tribe on October 10, 2018.

=== All Elite Wrestling (2019–2023) ===
It was announced in February 2019 that Sonny Kiss had signed with All Elite Wrestling (AEW). At AEW's inaugural pay-per-view event Double or Nothing on May 25, Kiss competed in the 21-man Casino Battle Royale, but was eliminated by Tommy Dreamer. At Fight for the Fallen on July 13, Kiss defeated Peter Avalon, earning her first win in AEW.

Kiss then went on a six match losing streak between November 2019 and March 2020 on AEW Dark, both in single and tag team matches. On 24 March 2020, Kiss formed a tag team with Joey Janela when they beat Corey Hollis and Mike Reed. After a two-month absence, the pair returned to the ring on the May 26 edition of AEW Dark, when they defeated Brady Pierce and John Skyler. On the May 27, 2020 episode of Dynamite, Kiss participated in a battle royal match to determine the number one contender for the TNT Championship but was eliminated by Wardlow. The pairing of Sonny Kiss and Janela led to a vignette on AEW Dynamite, in which the pair beat up of wrestlers at the gas station. Kiss and Janela made their tag team debut on the June 24 edition of AEW Dynamite against The Dark Order's Brodie Lee and Colt Cabana, which they lost after Cabana pinned Janela.

At Fight for the Fallen on July 15, Kiss challenged Cody for the AEW TNT Championship, but lost. At the All Out event on September 5, Kiss participated in the Casino Battle Royale, where she eliminated Jake Hager (following their encounter three days before to the event) before she was eliminated by Brian Cage. This led to Kiss and Janela facing Chris Jericho and Hager on the September 9 edition of AEW Dynamite in a No Disqualification Tag Team match, which they lost after Hager pinned Kiss, following a distraction from Jericho. On the 21 October edition of AEW Dynamite, Kiss was named as a replacement for Janela, who had withdrawn from a tournament to determine the number one contender for the AEW World Championship, but was eliminated in the first round by Kenny Omega. Throughout 2020 and 2021, Kiss often managed Joey Janela on AEW Dynamite against opponents Lance Archer, “Hangman” Adam Page, Chris Jericho, and Kenny Omega, to which Janela was unsuccessful.

In the beginning of 2021, there was growing dissension between Kiss and Janela when they embarked on losing streaks on AEW Dark matches, leading Janela to abandon Kiss. This led to the pair appearing in the Waiting Room with Britt Baker to settle the issues and they made amends. However, in the 9 August 2021 edition of AEW Dark: Elevation, Janela attacked Kiss prior to their tag team match, disbanding the team. Kiss then made her return on the 7 September 2021 edition of AEW Dark, where she attacked Janela following her match. Throughout the rest of 2021, both Kiss and Janela faced each other, where they each won once in two of their matches on AEW Dark: Elevation and AEW Dark to end their feud.

On 12 August 2022 of AEW Rampage, Kiss made her return to television for the first time in almost two years, losing in a squash match against Parker Boudreaux. On the same night following a match against Orange Cassidy and Ariya Daivari, Kiss rushed to the ring to save Orange Cassidy, only to give him a low blow and aligned with Ari Daivari, Slim J and Parker Boudreaux as part of a stable named The Trustbusters. In September 2023, Kiss' profile was removed from AEW's official website with Tony Khan confirming that Kiss' contract was not renewed.

=== Impact Wrestling (2023) ===
Kiss debuted in Impact Wrestling on October 21, 2023 at Bound for Glory as a participant in the 20-person Intergender Call Your Shot Gauntlet match. Kiss eliminated Gisele Shaw but then was eliminated by Brian Myers and Matt Cardona. On the November 16 episode of Impact!, Kiss challenged the Knockouts World Champion Trinity in a non-title match, but was unsuccessful.

== Personal life ==
Kiss is genderfluid, and despite generally wrestling against men, she uses both she/her and he/him pronouns.

In 2013, Kiss became a certified personal trainer and yoga instructor.

In November 2020, Kiss earned a Bachelor of Science in Exercise physiology.

On the podcast AEW Unrestricted, Kiss described herself as a "nostalgia junkie" and is a fan of various pop culture fads from the 1990s and early 2000s relating to fashion, gaming, television, and coming of age films. Kiss is a fan of rap metal band Limp Bizkit and has a relationship with the members of the band.

Kiss cites Chyna, D-Generation X, Rob Van Dam, Rey Mysterio, Trish Stratus, Lita, The Hardy Boyz, Jazz, Sharmell, Molly Holly, Miss Elizabeth, Victoria, Alicia Fox, and Gail Kim along with mentors Dustin Rhodes, Chris Jericho, and Billy Gunn as major influences. Kiss has stated in several interviews that Jacqueline was one of her biggest inspirations and that she grew up emulating her.

On January 3, 2025, Kiss became engaged to wrestler Billy Dixon, and the two subsequently married on March 8, 2025.

== Music career ==
In February 2022, Sonny Kiss recorded a song titled "Whatcha Lookin' At", which features American rapper Brinson, for the AEW: Who We Are soundtrack. The song was also featured in the AEW Fight Forever video game.

== Championships and accomplishments ==
- American Championship Wrestling
  - ACE Fight or Flight Championship (1 time)
- Capitol Wrestling
  - Catalyst Wrestling Championship (1 time)
- East Coast Professional Wrestling
  - East Coast Light Heavyweight Championship (1 time)
- Enjoy Wrestling
  - Enjoy Wrestling Championship (1 time)
- Juggalo Championship Wrestling
  - JCW Battle Royal Championship (1 time, inaugural)
- Pro Wrestling Illustrated
  - Ranked No. 164 of the top 500 singles wrestlers in the PWI 500 in 2020
- Tier 1 Wrestling
  - Tier 1 Championship (1 time)
- Warriors of Wrestling
  - WOW Heavyweight Championship (1 time)
  - WOW No Limits Championship (1 time)
  - King of New York (2018)
  - Woman of the Year (2022 and 2023)
- Women's Wrestling Hall of Fame
  - WWHOF Award (1 time)
    - Pride Award (2024)
