= JCW World Heavyweight Championship =

Men's professional wrestling world championship

Details
- Promotion: Juggalo Championship Wrestling
- Date established: December 19, 1999
- Current champion: Caleb Konley
- Date won: November 13, 2026

Other names
- JCW Heavyweight Championship (1999–2025); JCW Lunacy World Championship (2026–present); JCW World Heavyweight Championship (2026–present)
Statistics
- First champion: Evil Dead
- Most reigns: 2 Tuff Tony (6 reigns)
- Longest reign: Corporal Robinson (1,165 days)
- Shortest reign: <1 day: Shaggy 2 Dope; 2 Tuff Tony
- Oldest champion: Terry Funk (61 years, 24 days)
- Youngest champion: Kerry Morton (24 years, 21 days)
- Heaviest champion: Willie Mack (280 lb (130 kg))
- Lightest champion: Nosawa (190 lb (86 kg))

The JCW World Heavyweight Championship is a professional wrestling world heavyweight championship in Juggalo Championship Wrestling (JCW). The current champion is Caleb Konley, who is in his second reign. It was established in 1999 at JCW's first show, the taping for the DVD JCW Volume 1, with Evil Dead winning a 20-man battle royal. There have been a total of 30 recognized champions who have had a combined 44 official reigns.

== Lunacy vs. Linear World Heavyweight Championship ==
On the June 12, 2026 episode of JCW Lunacy, Josh Bishop made his return to JCW after being stripped of the belt in 2023 due to being unable to defend it. Commentators had acknowledged that he had brought a previous belt design for the championship and that it was not officially recognized despite his manager Joel Gertner claiming that he was the "real" champion. Konley and Bishop have since feuded over who was the real champion on several occasions with Konley's being referred to as the current JCW World Heavyweight Championship and Bishop's being referred to as the "linear" or sometimes disputed JCW World Heavyweight Championship.

== Reigns ==
Key
No.	Overall reign number
Reign	Reign number for the specific champion
Days	Number of days held

No.	Champion	Championship change			Reign statistics		Notes	Ref.
No.	Champion	Date	Event	Location	Reign	Days	Notes	Ref.
1	Evil Dead	December 19, 1999	JCW Volume 1	Detroit, MI	1	185	Dead won a 20-man battle royal to become the inaugural champion.	
2	Vampiro	June 21, 2000	House show	Detroit, MI	1	388		
—	Vacated	July 14, 2001	—	—	—	—	The title was vacated because previous champion Vampiro stopped defending it.	
3	Sabu	July 14, 2001	Gathering of the Juggalos	Toledo, OH	1	1	Sabu won a battle royal to win the vacant title.	
4	Vampiro	July 15, 2001	Gathering of the Juggalos	Toledo, OH	2	197		
5	Breyer Wellington	January 28, 2002	House show	Detroit, MI	1	173		
—	Vacated	July 20, 2002	—	—	—	—	The title was vacated after previous champion Breyer Wellington's title defense against Chris Candido ended in a no contest.	
6	Shaggy 2 Dope	July 21, 2002	Gathering of the Juggalos	Peoria, IL	1	<1	Shaggy 2 Dope won a battle royal to win the vacant title.	
7	Breyer Wellington	July 21, 2002	Gathering of the Juggalos	Peoria, IL	2	238		
8	Nosawa	March 16, 2003	JCW Volume 3	Columbus, OH	1	490		
9	Kid Kash	July 18, 2004	Gathering of the Juggalos	Garrettsville, OH	1	369		
10	2 Tuff Tony	July 22, 2005	JCW vs. TNA	Garrettsville, OH	1	<1	This was co-produced by Total Nonstop Action Wrestling. This three-way match also featured Lenny Lane.	
—	Vacated	July 22, 2005	—	—	—	—		
11	Terry Funk	July 23, 2005	JCW vs. TNA	Garrettsville, OH	1	1	This was a battle royal.	
12	Mad Man Pondo	July 24, 2005	JCW vs. TNA	Garrettsville, OH	1	464		
13	Corporal Robinson	October 31, 2006	Hallowicked After-Party '06	Detroit, MI	1	126		
14	Trent Acid	March 6, 2007	West Side Wars	Long Beach, CA	1	8	This was a Juggalo Championship Wrestling event. Aired on June 20, 2007.	
15	Corporal Robinson	March 14, 2007	East Side Wars	Philadelphia, PA	2	1,165	This was a Juggalo Championship Wrestling event. This was a Steel Cage match. Aired on July 28, 2007.	
16	Mad Man Pondo	May 22, 2010	Happy Daze Tour	Worcester, MA	2	9	Aired on May 25, 2010.	
17	Corporal Robinson	May 31, 2010	Happy Daze Tour	Denver, CO	3	324	This was a Four Corners of Pain match	
18	Butler Geeves	April 20, 2011	Up in Smoke	Southgate, MI	1	71	This triple threat match also featured Breyer Wellington.	
19	2 Tuff Tony	June 30, 2011	Send in the Clowns	Pontiac, MI	2	20		
20	Officer Colt Cabana	July 20, 2011	Above the Law	Pontiac, MI	1	8		
21	Corporal Robinson	July 28, 2011	Fuck the Police	Pontiac, MI	4	142		
—	Vacated	December 17, 2011	—	—	—	—	Previous champion Corporal Robinson retired.	
22	2 Tuff Tony	May 26, 2012	Hatchet Attacks	Farmington, NM	3	523	Defeated Kongo Kong to win the vacant title.	
23	Necro Butcher	October 31, 2013	Hallowicked After-Party '13	Detroit, MI	1	61		
24	The Rude Boy	December 31, 2013	Biggest Ballas Ever!	Pontiac, MI	1	124		
—	Vacated	May 4, 2014	—	—	—	—	Previous champion Rude Boy suffered an injured.	
25	2 Tuff Tony	May 4, 2014	Road to the Gathering Tour; Day 3	Toledo, OH	4	350	Tony won in a battle royal to win the vacant title, last eliminating Krimson.	
26	The Weedman	April 19, 2015	Smokin vs. Drinkin	Pontiac, MI	1	235		
27	Kongo Kong	December 10, 2015	The Incredible Rassle Rap Charity Festival Tour; Day 1	Valparaiso, IN	1	953		
28	Shane Mercer	July 20, 2018	Bloodymania 12	Thornville, OH	1	378		
29	Teddy Hart	August 2, 2019	Gathering of the Juggalos; Day 2	Springville, IN	1	502		
30	2 Tuff Tony	December 16, 2020	Bringing Down the House	Milford, MI	5	247		
31	Vampiro	August 20, 2021	Bloodymania 15	Thornville, OH	3	687		
—	Vacated	July 8, 2023	—	—	—	—	Previous champion Vampiro retired as a wrestler for JCW.	
32	Josh Bishop	July 8, 2023	Bloodymania 16: Voltage 2 High!	Thornville, OH	1	230	Defeated Joey Janela, Matthew Justice, and Tom Lawlor in a four-way Electrified Cage match. Previous champion Vampiro awared the title to Bishop.	
—	Vacated	February 23, 2024	—	—	—	—		
33	Willie Mack	February 23, 2024	Juggalo Weekend	San Antonio, TX	1	175	Mack won in a battle royal to win the vacant title, last eliminating Silas Mason.	
34	Matt Cross	August 16, 2024	Bloodymania 17	Thornville, OH	1	75		
35	Willie Mack	October 30, 2024	Devil's Night Creature Double Feature	Detroit, MI	2	177	This three-way match also featured Mecha Wolf	
36	Kerry Morton	April 25, 2025	Lunacy: Hella Pain & Diamond Rain Tour	Joliet, IL	1	55	Aired on tape delay on May 22, 2025.	
37	Mad Man Pondo	June 19, 2025	Lunacy	Green Bay, WI	3	28	Aired on tape delay on July 17, 2025.	
38	Matt Tremont	July 17, 2025	Showcase Showdown: The Violence is Right	Detroit, MI	1	29	This was co-produced by Game Changer Wrestling. This was a Deathmatch.	
39	2 Tuff Tony	August 15, 2025	The 2 Day War; Night 2	Thornville, OH	6	77	This was co-produced by Game Changer Wrestling. This was a Deathmatch.	
40	Matt Cardona	October 31, 2025	Lunacy: Hallowicked	Detroit, MI	1	78	Cardona competed under the masked persona of "The Mysterious Carnival of Carnage"; he unmasked during the match. Aired on tape delay on January 1, 2026.	
—	Vacated	January 17, 2026	—	—	—	—	Previous champion Matt Cardona signed with WWE.	
41	Mr. Anderson	January 18, 2026	Lunacy: Carnival of Chaos Tour	Albuquerque, NM	1	41	Defeated James Storm to win the vacant title. Aired on tape delay on February 5, 2026.	
42	CoKane	February 28, 2026	Juggalo Weekend	Hialeah, FL	1	85		
43	Caleb Konley	May 24, 2026	Lunacy: Mayday! On the Front Lines	Lansing, MI	1	160	Aired on tape delay on June 18, 2026.	
44	Nic Nemeth	October 31, 2026	Lunacy: Hallowicked 2026	Detroit, MI	1	13	Aired on tape delay on November 12, 2026.	
45	Caleb Konley	November 13, 2026	Lunacy: Skankfest	New Orleans, LA	2	8+	Aired on tape delay on November 19, 2026.	

== Combined reigns ==
As of November 21, 2026.

2 Tuff Tony has the most reigns at six.

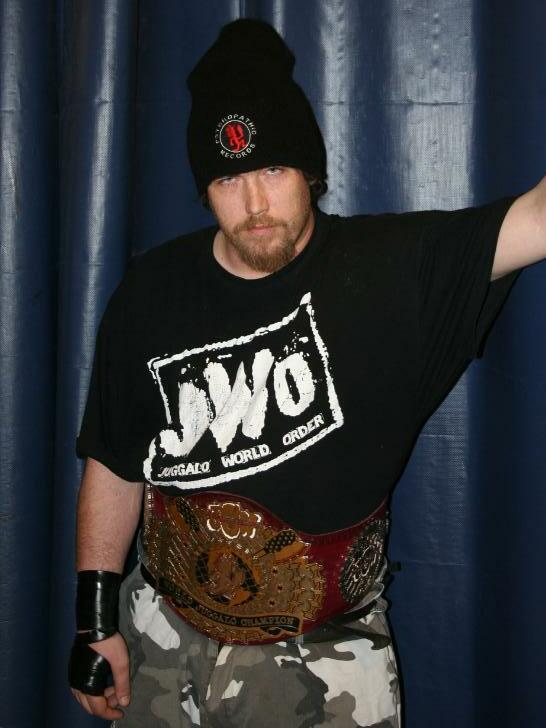
Corporal Robinson has the most combined days at 1,757 days. Robinson's second reign is the longest individual reign at 1,165 days.

†	Indicates the current champion

Rank	Wrestler	No. of reigns	Combined days
1	Corporal Robinson	4	1,757
2	Vampiro	3	1,272
3	2 Tuff Tony	6	1,217
4	Kongo Kong	1	953
5	Mad Man Pondo	3	501
6	Nosawa	1	490
7	Teddy Hart	1	502
8	Breyer Wellington	2	411
9	Shane Mercer	1	378
10	Kid Kash	1	369
11	Willie Mack	2	352
12	The Weedman	1	235
13	Josh Bishop	1	230
14	Evil Dead	1	185
15	Caleb Konley †	2	168+
16	The Rude Boy	1	124
17	CoKane	1	85
18	Matt Cardona	1	78
19	Matt Cross	1	75
20	Butler Geeves	1	71
21	Necro Butcher	1	61
22	Kerry Morton	1	55
23	Mr. Anderson	1	41
24	Matt Tremont	1	29
25	Nic Nemeth †	1	13
26	Officer Colt Cabana	1	8
26	Trent Acid	1	8
28	Sabu	1	1
28	Terry Funk	1	1
30	Shaggy 2 Dope	1	<1

== See also ==
- JCW World Tag Team Championship
