= JCW American Championship =

Men's professional wrestling championship

- The JCW American Championship belt

Details
- Promotion: Juggalo Championship Wrestling
- Date established: August 15, 2024
- Current champion: Facade
- Date won: October 11, 2026
Statistics
- First champion: Caleb Konley
- Most reigns: Caleb Konley (2 reigns)
- Longest reign: Caleb Konley (2nd reign, 237 days)
- Shortest reign: 2 Tuff Tony (75 days)
- Oldest champion: 2 Tuff Tony (46 years, 198 days)
- Youngest champion: Ninja Mack (35 years, 304 days)
- Heaviest champion: 2 Tuff Tony (240 lb (110 kg))
- Lightest champion: Facade (187 lb (85 kg))

The JCW American Championship is a professional wrestling championship in Juggalo Championship Wrestling (JCW). The current champion is Facade, who is in his second reign.

== Reigns ==
As of November 8, 2026, there have been six reigns among five champions. Caleb Konley was the inaugural champion. Konley has the most reigns at two, and his second reign is the longest in the title's history at 237 days (officially recognized as 266 days). 2 Tuff Tony has the shortest reign at 75 days, but Ninja Mack has the officially recognized shortest reign at 42 days. Tony is also the oldest champion, who won the title at 46 years and 198 days old, while Mack is the youngest champion, who won the title at 35 years and 304 days old.

Facade is the current champion in his first reign. He won the title by defeating Father Bronson during Shocktober Slam in Belleville, Michigan on October 11, 2026.

Key
No.	Overall reign number
Reign	Reign number for the specific champion
Days	Number of days held
Days recog.	Number of days held recognized by the promotion

No.	Champion	Championship change			Reign statistics			Notes	Ref.
No.	Champion	Date	Event	Location	Reign	Days	Days recog.	Notes	Ref.
1	Caleb Konley	August 15, 2024	Gathering of the Juggalos	Thornville, OH	1	128	167	Konley won a 17-man battle royal to become the inaugural champion.	
2	2 Tuff Tony	December 21, 2024	Lunacy: Big Ballas Holiday Party	Columbus, OH	1	75	57	Aired on tape delay on January 29, 2025.	
3	Caleb Konley	March 6, 2025	Lunacy	Las Vegas, NV	2	237	266	Aired on tape delay on March 27, 2025.	
4	Ninja Mack	October 29, 2025	Lunacy	Columbia, MS	1	80	42	Aired on tape delay on December 18, 2025.	
5	Facade	January 17, 2026	Lunacy	Denver, CO	1	153	147	Aired on tape delay on January 29, 2026.	
6	Father Bronson	June 19, 2026	Lunacy	Detroit, MI	1	114	133	Aired on tape delay on June 25, 2026.	
7	Facade	October 11, 2026	Lunacy Shocktober Slam	Belleville, MI	2	28+	3+	Aired on tape delay on November 5, 2026.	

== Combined reigns ==
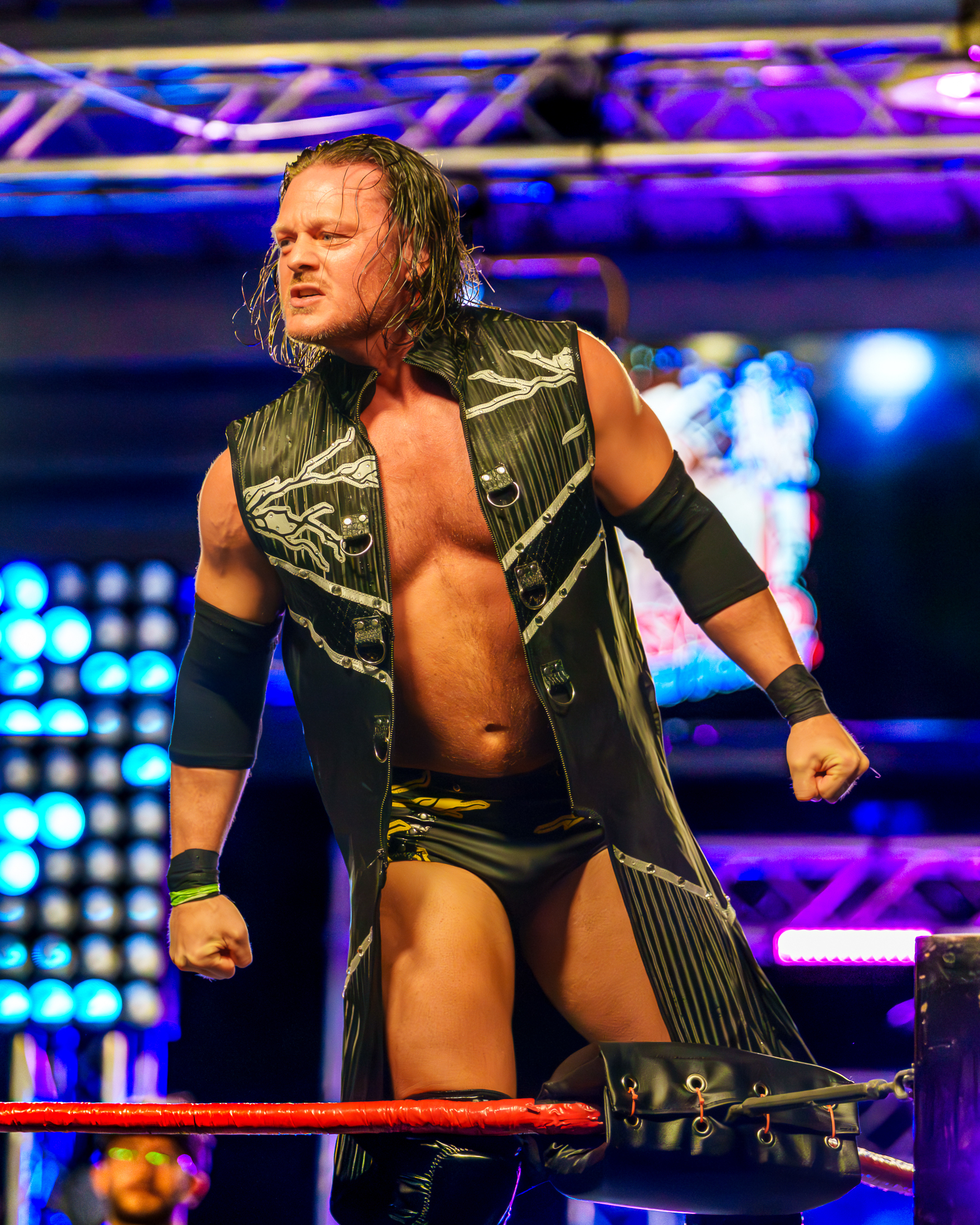
Record two-time champion Caleb Konley has the most combined days at 365 (recognized as 433).

As of November 8, 2026.

†	Indicates the current champion

Rank	Wrestler	No. of reigns	Combined days	
Rank	Wrestler	No. of reigns	Actual	Recognized by JCW
1	Caleb Konley	2	365	433
2	Facade †	2	181+	150+
3	Father Bronson	1	114	108
4	Ninja Mack	1	80	42
5	2 Tuff Tony	1	75	57
