= Joe Dombrowski (professional wrestling) =

Professional wrestler, commentator, and ring announcer (born 1985)

- Born: November 30, 1985 (age 40); Bellevue, Pennsylvania, U.S.
- Employers: International Wrestling Cartel (2003–2009); One Pro Wrestling (2005–2006; 2023); Pro Wrestling Ohio (2007–2011); Ring of Honor (2010–2019); Combat Zone Wrestling (2010–2017); Deadlock Pro-Wrestling (2022); Dragon Gate USA (2025–present); Major League Wrestling (2021–present); Juggalo Championship Wrestling (2024–present)

Joseph Dombrowski is a professional wrestling commentator, ring announcer, and former professional wrestler. He is currently signed to Major League Wrestling (MLW) where he serves as a play-by-play commentator for their various events. He also worked as a play-by-play commentator for several promotions including Juggalo Championship Wrestling (JCW), and Dragon Gate USA, Ring of Honor, Progress Wrestling, Deadlock Pro-Wrestling (DPW), One Pro Wrestling (1PW), Lucha Libre AAA Worldwide (AAA), International Wrestling Cartel (IWC), and Combat Zone Wrestling (CZW).

== Career ==
On January 25, 2003, Dombrowski made his professional wrestling commentary debut when he began providing commentary for International Wrestling Cartel (IWC) matches starting with a live event in Bellevue, Pennsylvania. By February 2003, Dombrowski had begun writing results articles and feature columns for the IWC's website.

In 2005, Dombrowski began working in a front-office position for the United Kingdom-based independent promotion One Pro Wrestling (1PW) and had also begun serving as a commentator for the promotion's various events and its weekly television show.

In October 2007, Dombrowski joined the creative department for Pro Wrestling Ohio (PWO), later known as PRIME Wrestling, and eventually became the lead booker for the promotion while also serving as a play-by-play commentator for the promotion's weekly television show and various events that were taped for DVD or were streamed live on internet pay-per-view services. On February 13, 2009, Dombrowski was hired by Ring of Honor to serve as a play-by-play commentator for the promotion's DVD event tapings and occasional pay-per-view events beginning with the promotion's 8th anniversary show.

On October 12, 2021, Major League Wrestling (MLW) announced that Dombrowski had signed with the promotion as a play-by-play commentator beginning with the fourth episode of MLW Fusion: Alpha.

On September 27, 2023, Dombrowski made a series of posts on X, accusing 1PW owner Steven Gauntley of deceptive business practises and fraud, claiming Gauntley had misrepresented 1PW's value, by claiming things he or the company didn't even own.
