= Kaleb Konley =

American professional wrestler (born 1986)

Caleb Konley
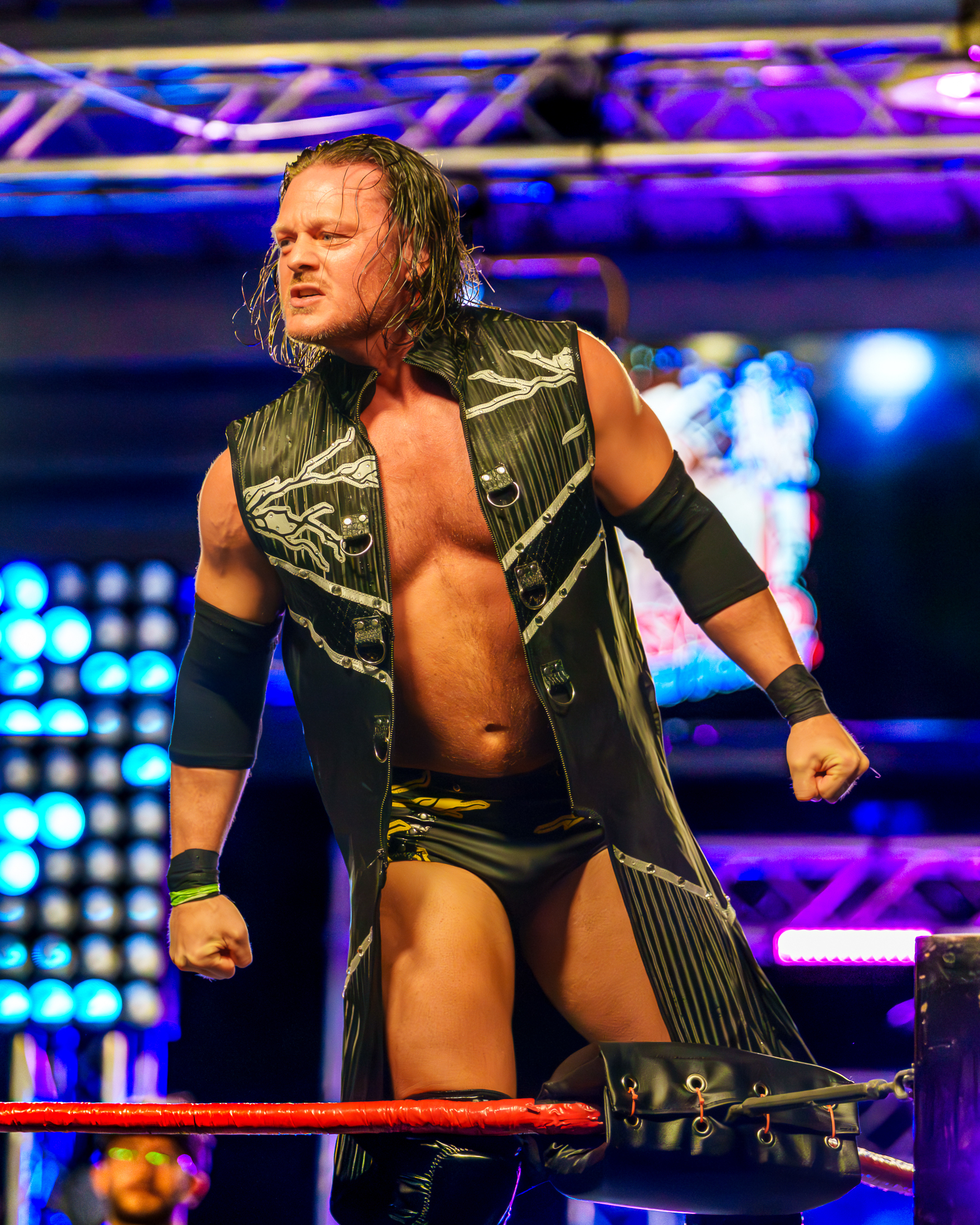
- Konley in 2026

Personal information
- Born: Mason Caleb Burnett; August 30, 1986 (age 40) Atlanta, Georgia U.S.

Professional wrestling career
- Ring name(s): Black Pegasus; Caleb Konley; Kaleb with a K Kaleb Konley; Diamond Connery; Diamond Konley; Suicide; Sewacide
- Billed height: 5 ft 11 in (1.80 m)
- Billed weight: 207 lb (94 kg)
- Billed from: Charlotte, North Carolina
- Trained by: George South; Ikuto Hidaka; Rob Adonis; Murder-1
- Debut: September 17, 2005

Mason Caleb Burnett (born August 30, 1986), better known by his ring name Caleb Konley, is an American professional wrestler. He performs on the independent circuit – primarily with Juggalo Championship Wrestling (JCW), where he is the former one-time JCW World Heavyweight Champion. He is best known for his time with Paragon Pro Wrestling (PPW), where he was the promotion's inaugural and one-time PPW Heavyweight Champion, and Impact Wrestling, where he performed as the masked Suicide, Caleb Konley, and Kaleb with a K. He has also worked with All Elite Wrestling (AEW), WrestleCade, America's Most Liked Wrestling (AML), Game Changer Wrestling, and the National Wrestling Alliance (NWA).

== Early life ==
Mason Caleb Burnett was born on August 30, 1986 in Atlanta, Georgia.

== Professional wrestling career ==
=== Independent circuit (2005–present) ===
On September 17, 2005 for Pro Wrestling Evolution, Konley made his debut under the ring name Black Pegasus.

In the fall of 2019 he began appearing on the National Wrestling Alliance's NWA Power YouTube series under the name Caleb Konley. On the March 3 edition of Power, Konley and his tag team partner C. W. Anderson defeated the Dawson's to win contracts with the NWA.

=== Total Nonstop Action Wrestling / Impact Wrestling (2016–2022) ===
In April 2016, Konley made his Total Nonstop Action Wrestling (TNA) debut at Impact tapings, facing both Eddie Edwards and DJZ in losing efforts for Xplosion. On April 29, TNA officially announced Konley's signing to the company. Konley would make his last appearance as a contracted wrestler at One Night Only: X-Travaganza, where Konley once again faced off against Edwards in a losing effort. In March 2017, Burnett began working under a mask as the newest incarnation of the Suicide character.

On August 17, 2017, at Destination X: Impact, Konley would interfere on behalf of Trevor Lee in the X Division Championship match against Sonjay Dutt, forming an alliance and turning heel in the process. In the coming weeks, Konley would go on to change his attire to simple black trunks, mirroring Trevor Lee's look. On the October 5 episode of Impact!, Konley, Lee and Andrew Everett would face Sonjay Dutt, Petey Williams, and Matt Sydal in a losing effort in a six-man tag team match. On January 1, 2019, Trevor Lee left Impact Wrestling, disbanding the team. On January 26, 2019, his profile was moved to the alumni section. On March 1, 2019, Konley announced on his Twitter that he had officially become a free agent.

On the September 8, 2020, episode of Impact, Konley made his return to Impact under the name Kaleb with a K debuting a new gimmick of Tenille Dashwood's personal photographer. On April 14, 2022, Konley announced his departure from Impact Wrestling.

== Personal life ==
Burnett was formerly in a relationship with fellow professional wrestlers Shannon Spruill (best known as Daffney) and Kris Statlander. Burnett and Spurill's relationship was explored in a 2025 episode of Dark Side of the Ring.

Burnett is a resident of Charlotte, North Carolina, having moved there in 2007. Burnett has two dogs named Harlot and Saul. Additionally, Burnett also shared a bearded dragon named Boots with Stadtlander.

== Championships and accomplishments ==
- Appalachian Championship Wrestling
  - ACW Super H Championship (1 time)
  - ACW Bluegrass Con Championship (1 time)
- America's Most Liked Wrestling
  - AML Championship (1 time)
  - AML Prestige Championship (1 time)
- Bayou Independent Wrestling
  - BIW Southern Championship (1 time)
- Carolina Wrestling Association / Pro Wrestling International / Premiere Wrestling Xperience
  - PWI Ultra J Championship (2 times)
  - PWX Heavyweight Championship (2 times)
  - PWX Tag Team Championships (1 time) – with Zane Riley
- Deep South Wrestling
  - DSW Tag Team Championship (1 time, final) – with Sal Rinauro
- Dragon Gate USA
  - Open the United Gate Championship (1 time) – with Anthony Nese and Trent Barreta
  - Six-Man Tag Team Tournament (2014) – with Anthony Nese and Trent Barreta
- Exodus Wrestling Alliance
  - EWA Junior Heavyweight Championship (1 time)
- Fantasy Super Cosplay Wrestling
  - FSCW Multiverse Championship (1 time)
- Full Force Wrestling
  - FFW 24/7 Hardcore Championship (1 time)
- Full Impact Pro
  - FIP World Heavyweight Championship (1 time)
  - FIP Tag Team Championship (1 time) – with Scott Reed
  - Florida Rumble (2014) – with Rich Swann
- Generation Next Pro Wrestling
  - GNPW Championship (1 time)
- Juggalo Championship Wrestling
  - JCW American Championship (2 times, inaugural)
  - JCW World Heavyweight Championship (1 time, current)
- Next Generation Wrestling
  - NGW Eastern States Championship (1 time)
- Old School Championship Wrestling
  - OSCW Tag Team Championship (1 time) – with Zane Riley
- Paragon Pro Wrestling
  - PPW Heavyweight Championship (1 time)
  - PPW Tag Team Championship (1 time) – with Drew Donovan
- Pro Wrestling Illustrated
  - Ranked No. 259 of the best 500 singles wrestlers in the PWI 500 in 2016
- The Wrestling Revolver
  - Open Invite Scramble Championship (1 time)
- Revolution Wrestling Authority
  - RWA World Heavyweight Championship (1 time)
- West Coast Wrestling Connection
  - WCWC Pacific Northwest Championship (1 time)
  - WCWC Legacy Championship (1 time)
  - WCWC Tag Team Championship (1 time) – with Mikey O'Shea
- WrestleForce
  - WrestleForce Championship (1 time)
