= Kerry Morton =

American professional wrestler

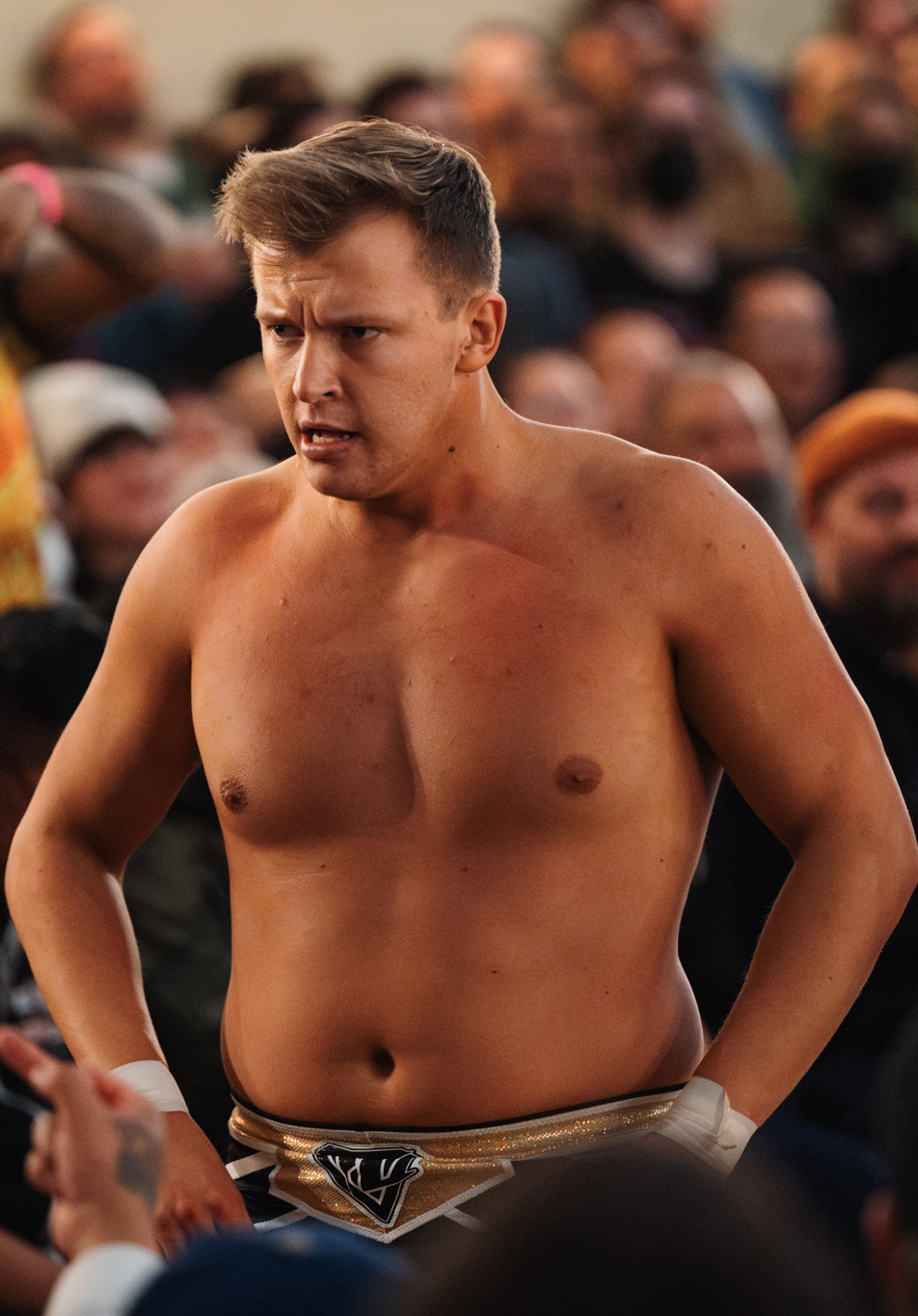
- Morton in 2024

Personal information
- Born: April 4, 2001 (age 25) Bristol, Tennessee, U.S.
- Parent(s): Paul Morton (grandfather); Ricky Morton (father); Todd Morton (cousin)

Professional wrestling career
- Ring name: Kerry Morton
- Billed height: 5 ft 11 in (180 cm)
- Billed weight: 191 lb (87 kg)
- Trained by: Bobby Eaton; Chase Owens; Ricky Morton; Robert Gibson; Tom Prichard
- Debut: August 6, 2016

Kerry Morton (born April 4, 2001) is an American professional wrestler. He is signed to the National Wrestling Alliance (NWA), where he is a former one-time NWA World Junior Heavyweight Champion. He also performs on the independent circuit – predominantly for Juggalo Championship Wrestling (JCW), where he is regarded as Mr JCW.

Kerry is a second-generation professional wrestler, being the son of Ricky Morton. Kerry's grandfather, Paul, was also a professional wrestling referee.

== Early life ==
Morton attended King University where he started cheerleading for the university's Tornado sports teams.

== Professional wrestling career ==
=== National Wrestling Alliance (2021–present) ===
Morton made his debut in the National Wrestling Alliance (NWA) on December 4, 2021, at the Hard Times 2 pre-show in a NWA World Junior Heavyweight Championship Qualifying Gauntlet match, which was won by Homicide. on the January 22, 2022 episode of NWA USA, which taped on December 3, 2021, where he defeated Jamie Stanley during the quarterfinals of the World Junior Heavyweight Championship tournament. He was later eliminated by Colby Corino. On November 12, at Hard Times 3, Morton defeated Homicide to win the World Junior Heavyweight Championship. On December 14, Morton confirmed that he has signed with NWA. On February 11, 2023, at Nuff Said, Morton successfully defended the title against Alex Taylor. On April 7 at NWA 312, Morton successfully defended the title against Joe Alonzo. On May 17, Morton successfully defended the title against Evan Golden. Morton lost title at NWA 75 on August 26, 2023 to Colby Corino. Morton made his Boca Raton Championship Wrestling debut at the March Madhouse event where he wrestled against Curt Stallion.

In the 2024 Crockett Cup, Morton and partner "Thrillbilly" Silas Mason won a first round match against The Slimeballz. Following an injury, Mason was replaced by their Southern Six stablemate Alex Taylor. Morton and Taylor subsequently defeated the teams of The Country Gentlemen, Knox and Murdoch, and The Immortals (J. R. Kratos and Odinson) to win the Crockett Cup tournament.

=== Juggalo Championship Wrestling (2024–present) ===
On February 23, 2024, Morton made his Juggalo Championship Wrestling (JCW) debut during the Juggalo Weekend festival in San Antonio, Texas. His first match with the promotion was a battle royal for the vacant JCW Heavyweight Championship. On the premiere episode of JCW Lunacy, Morton along with his teammates Alex Taylor and Silas Mason as the Southern 6 would face off in the Main event versus JCW Champion Willie Mack and his partners Matt Cross and Santana Jackson in a Six-man tag match. The Southern 6 would emerge victorious when Mason pinned Santana Jackson following his finisher The Thrill Ride. While celebrating in the ring former Southern 6 member James Storm would make an appearance stating that Violent J had called him that morning stating he had a problem and that Kerry Morton was that problem. Storm insulted Morton and the 6 and then hit the ring to attack them but Mason and Taylor quickly left the ring leaving Morton to take a beating from Storm. Morton was pulled from the ring before Storm landed a Superkick and Storm would go on to insult Morton even more before the show closed out.

On the May 22, 2025 episode of JCW Lunacy, Morton defeated Willie Mack to become the new JCW Heavyweight Champion.

== Championships and accomplishments ==
- Appalachian Mountain Wrestling
  - AMW Tag Team Championship (2 times) – with Ricky Morton
- Joe Cazana Promotions
  - JCP Tag Team Championship (1 time) – with Ricky Morton
- Kross Fire Wrestling
  - KFW Championship (1 time)
- Innovate Pro Wrestling
  - IPW United States Tag Team Championship (1 time) – with JC Addams
- Wildfire Championship Wrestling
  - Wildfire Junior Heavyweight Championship (1 time)
  - Wildfire Tag Team Championship (1 time) – with Ricky Morton
- Juggalo Championship Wrestling
  - JCW Heavyweight Championship (1 time)
  - JCW Tag Team Championship (1 time) – with James Storm
  - JCW Battle Royal Championship (1 time)
- North Carolina Wrestling Association
  - 13th Annual Ivan Koloff Tag Team Tournament (2025) – with Ricky Morton
- National Wrestling Alliance
  - NWA World Junior Heavyweight Championship (1 time)
  - Crockett Cup (2024) - with Alex Taylor
  - NWA United States Tag Team Championship (1 time) – with Alex Taylor
  - NWA Champions Series Tournament (2023) – with Ricky Morton, Chris Adonis, Taya Valkyrie, Madi Wrenkowski, Jennacide, Mims, Dak Draper and Alex Taylor Willoughby
- Pro Wrestling Illustrated
  - Ranked No. 132 of the top 500 singles wrestlers in the PWI 500 in 2023
- Xtreme World Wrestling
  - XWW Heavyweight Championship (1 time)
- World Class Professional Big Time Wrestling
  - Jim Hines Memorial Battle Royal (2024)
- Appalachian Championship Wrestling
  - ACW Tag Team Championship (2 time) – with Ricky Morton
- Midwest Wrestling Coalition
  - MWC Heavyweight Championship (1 time)
- 3XWrestling
  - 3XW Tag Team Championship (1 time) – with Ricky Morton
- T-Mart Promotions
  - T-Mart Heavyweight Championship (1 time)
  - T-Mart Championship (1 time, inaugural)
  - T-Mart Title Rumble (2023)
- Pure Pro Wrestling
  - PPW Tag Team Championship (1 time) – with Ricky Morton
