= Gathering of the Juggalos 2024 =

2024 music festival organized by Psychopathic Records

- Promotional poster
- Date: August 14–17, 2024
- Venue: Legend Valley
- Locations: Thornville, Ohio, United States
- Previous event: 2023
- Next event: 2025
- Organizer: Psychopathic Records
- Website: juggalogathering.com

The 2024 Gathering of the Juggalos (also known as The Gathering or GOTJ) was a music festival organized by Psychopathic Records, a record label owned by the Detroit-based horrorcore hip-hop duo, the Insane Clown Posse. The festival took place from August 14 to August 17, 2024 at Legend Valley in Thornville, Ohio.

== Background ==
The Gathering of the Juggalos was created in 1999 when Rob Bruce, also known by his stagename "Jumpsteady", organized an event for all Juggalos, a concept long talked about by Insane Clown Posse. The first Gathering took place in Novi, Michigan at the Novi Expo Center on July 21–22, 2000, with roughly 2,000 fans in attendance. The festival featured concert performances, autograph sessions, seminars, wrestling hosted by Juggalo Championshxt Wrestling (JCW), tattooing, a haunted house, video games, contests, an ICP memorabilia museum and more. The second Gathering took place from July 13–15, 2001 at the Seagate Convention Centre in Toledo, Ohio. The event was controversially ended when the Toledo Police Department cut the Insane Clown Posse's concert at the festival short on July 15, 2001 which resulted in a riot.

During the 2002 Gathering of the Juggalos, a riot had broken out between 1,000 attendees and police that was caused by officers arresting a woman in the exhibit hall for baring her breasts. Tear gas, rubber bullets, and pepper spray were released into the crowd, however, representatitives from Psychopathic Records were able to negotiate with the police and the festival continued 30 minutes after the riot started.

During the 2004 Gathering, the hip-hop group Bone Thugs-n-Harmony held a surprise reunion concert on the opening night.

Cave-In-Rock, Illinois also hosted the eighth Gathering of the Juggalos at Hogrock Campgrounds on August 9–12, 2007, with over 8,000 fans attending the four-day event. Like the previous year, over 100 bands were featured. Performances on the main and second stages included Ying Yang Twins, Necro, Haystak, Zug Izland, Prozak, Mushroomhead, and Insane Poetry. Comedians included Joey Gay. Bloodymania, the culmination of Juggalo Championship Wrestling's web show, SlamTV!, debuted at the event. Anybody Killa was also announced to have signed back with Psychopathic Records.

Cave-In-Rock also hosted the ninth Gathering of the Juggalos on August 7–10, 2008, which included guest performances by Afroman, Andrew W.K., Ice-T, and Bizarre. Both Bloodymania II and the debut of Oddball Wrestling was presented by Juggalo Championship Wrestling. The Gathering was filmed by Psychopathic Video for the documentary A Family Underground, which was released on May 12, 2009.

The tenth Gathering of the Juggalos August 6–9, 2009, had the largest attendance in Gathering history with over 20,000 people. Over 120 musical artists performed at the event, including Ice Cube, Gwar, Coolio, and Scarface. During their set, Insane Clown Posse debuted the songs "Juggalo Island" and "Bang! Pow! Boom!" from their then-upcoming album Bang! Pow! Boom! Juggalo Championship Wrestling hosted Bloodymania III, Oddball Wrestling, and Flashlight Wrestling. Stand-up comedians included Jimmie Walker and Pauly Shore. The trailer for Big Money Rustlas also premiered during the event, where it was screened twice.

In honor of the Western comedy film Big Money Rustlas being released at the following event, the eleventh Gathering of the Juggalos, August 12-15, 2010, featured a "Best in the West" West Coast hip hop theme. Guest performances include Naughty by Nature, Spice 1, Method Man & Redman, Above the Law, and Warren G. A "Ladies' Night", hosted by Sugar Slam, featured performances by Kisa, Lil V, Ill E. Gal, and Tila Tequila. Shaggy 2 Dope hosted "Shaggy's Old School Super Jam", featuring DJing by 2 Dope and performances by Tone Lōc and Rob Base. Comedy was provided by Tom Green, Gallagher, and Ron Jeremy. During the festival, performers Method Man and Tila Tequila suffered facial lacerations as a result of objects that were hurled at them from the crowd. Both performers remained on stage, but, Tila Tequila suffered the worst reaction from the crowd with reports that indicated that several attendees in the crowd had threw various objects (including feces), in her direction. Method man suffered a cut on his face, but continued the set and eventually won over the crowd. Five wrestling shows were booked for the event; Bloodymania IV, two Flashlight Wrestling events, a Half Pint Brawlers event, and Oddball Wrestling.

The twelfth annual Gathering of the Juggalos August 11–14, 2011, debuted the use of a celebrity host for each night's main stage with Dustin Diamond, Jumpsteady, Charlie Sheen, and Flavor Flav. Guest acts included artists Busta Rhymes, Mystikal, Juvenile, Lil Jon, George Clinton and Parliament-Funkadelic, Saliva, Ice Cube, Xzibit, and Paris. All of the main stage performances, as well as the wrestling events Bloodymania 5 and Legends & Icons, were broadcast live on internet pay-per-view. It was also announced that Vanilla Ice had signed with Psychopathic Records.

The thirteenth annual gathering took place from August 8–12, 2012, in Cave-In-Rock and featured Insane Clown Posse, Twiztid, Psychopathic Rydas, Dark Lotus, Blaze Ya Dead Homie, ABK, comedian Ralphie May, DJ Clay, Mike E. Clark, and Cold 187 AKA Big Hutch. Some other guest artists and groups included Tech N9ne, The Pharcyde, Soulfly, Fear Factory, Cheech & Chong, Danny Brown, Slaine, ¡Mayday! & the Geto Boys. A volume of photographs by Daniel Cronin from the event has been published, showing predominantly the people attending the event, not the performers.

The fourteenth annual gathering took place from August 7–11, 2013, in Cave-In-Rock. This was also the final time that the Gathering would be held in Cave-In-Rock. During the festival, it was reported that a 24-year-old man was found dead in a tent at the festival. Also during the event, authorities had made 6 arrests including two suspected drug busts and reported that there were 10 overdoses at the event.

In February 2014, it was announced that the Gathering would be moving from its home at Cave-in-Rock to a family Campground in Kaiser, Missouri. However, several local citizens vigorously protested the Gathering being held in this location and the event had to be moved once more. It was reported by Insane Clown Posse themselves that locals had started a petition to keep the Gathering out of their area and flooded the owners of the campground with angry phone calls. Finally, a self-professed Juggalo referred to as Steve (who had previously been to the Gathering himself) contacted Psychopathic Records and offered the 120-acre Legend Valley as a place to host the event. Legend Valley (located in Thornville, Ohio) was officially chosen as the Gathering's venue for 2014. In a statement by Psychopathic Records in the February 28, 2014 edition of the Hatchet Herald, it was said that "Mere hours after the news begin spreading that Kaiser, Missouri would not welcome the Juggalo Family, we began receiving phone calls and emails from interested land owners and promoters who wanted to help ensure that the Gathering of the Juggalos found a home. One of the calls we got was from a down-ass ninja named Steve who owns the Legend Valley. [...] Steve has actually been to the Gathering of the Juggalos before and is not buying into the media's portrayal of what the Gathering is because he has been there. He has expressed to us that he is super down to host the Gathering this year and has always found Juggalos to be cool ass people. He also believes in our fight alongside the ACLU to have Juggalos removed from the FBI gang list, which is still on the list as a "loosely organized hybrid gang" because their sorry ass case was thrown out of court in 2014. In other words, he has our backs and is the perfect ninja we needed to ensure an awesome, trouble-free Gathering this year."

Legend Valley in Thornville, Ohio hosted the fifteenth annual Gathering of the Juggalos, which took place between July 23, 2014, and July 26, 2014. Advertised as "Shangri-La on Earth", this Gathering has over 70 artists scheduled to perform, including the entire Psychopathic Records roster and several notable guests such as Twiztid, Blaze Ya Dead Homie, Cypress Hill, Cannibal Corpse, Kottonmouth Kings, Tech N9ne, Da Mafia 6ix, and other artists. Also scheduled to perform are several comedians, including (most notably) Gilbert Gottfried. Three special parties are planned for the gathering: Kuma's Psychopathic All-Star Party, DJ Clay's Horney Nuts and Big Butts Party, and the Frothy Murder Mix Foam Party. Alongside all these events will be dance competitions, several contests, and Juggalo Championship Wrestling events (including JCW's Road to Bloodymania and Bloodymania 8), plus carnival rides, the annual ICP seminar, auctions, and more. In addition, it was announced via the Insane Clown Posse's Twitter account that there was to be a new Dark Lotus album slated for the 2014 Gathering.

It was announced at the Insane Clown Posse seminar at Legend Valley that the Gathering of the Juggalos would be held in Colorado in 2017. However, on April 11, 2017. Faygoluvers.net announced that would the 2017 edition of the Gathering was going to be held in Oklahoma City, Oklahoma at the Lost Lakes Amphitheater from July 26–29, 2017.

In 2018, the Gathering returned to Legend Valley on July 18–21. Nicknamed "Whoopstock", the festival featured several notable musicians alongside Psychopathic Records' roster including Jelly Roll, Yelawolf, Hopsin, and Gwar. During the festival, several tribute bands themed after the Grateful Dead, Jimi Hendrix, Santana, and Janis Joplin also performed.

On January 18, 2024, Psychopathic Records announced that the 2024 Gathering of the Juggalos would take place from August 14, 2024 to August 17, 2024 at Legend Valley in Thornville, Ohio. On June 10, 2024, it was reported by Futurism that the ticketing service for the Gathering had been the victim of a cyberattack in which attendees had been sent emails regarding the hack saying "It is with great regret to let you know that the Gathering order you placed is not valid and we had to cancel it (the QR codes will no longer work),". The email also included steps for attendees to claim their payment as a fraudulent charge and request a refund from the payment processor.

== Performer lineup ==
The lineup for the 2024 Gathering of the Juggalos included several notable names including Psychopathic Records artists Ouija Macc, Mike E. Clark, and Esham, Chapter 17 Records artist Darby O'Trill, Flint, Michigan-based hip-hop grip The Dayton Family, Canadian rapper Merkules, Detroit rapper Mastamind, Three 6 Mafia member DJ Paul, and Los Angeles-based industrial metal band Static-X. The event was headlined by Insane Clown Posse who performed two special sets titled the House of Horrors and The Red Show. The festival also featured stand-up comedy from Big Jay Oakerson and Zac Amico.

=== Macabre Stage ===
Wednesday (August 14)	Thursday (August 15)	Saturday (August 16)	Sunday (August 17)
HB The Grizzly; SFFTG; Yung Mo$h; Shaggy The Airhead; Hatchetman Project; Scum & Insane Poetry; Esham	Darby O'Trill; Mastamind; The Dayton Family; Merkules; Insane Clown Posse's House of Horrors	$alamanderx; Twisted Insane; Ganksta N-I-P; Rakim; Kim Dracula; Ouija Macc	Grimm; Bleed The Wicked Menace; Vended; DJ Paul; Static-X; Insane Clown Posse's Red Show

=== Omen Stage ===
Wednesday (August 14)	Thursday (August 15)	Saturday (August 16)	Sunday (August 17)
Rook Mewsick; Bazooka Sharkz; Jordon Stepp; Dying Oath; Roxx TV; Bible Belt Massacre; S.O.N.; Smallz One; V Sinizter; The Hooliganz; Cartoon Bondurant	Posezur; Trauma 2 $ick; Percy Bones; Saint Diablo; O.I.C.; Scream At The Sky; Ummo; Monster Wolf; Galactic Empire; King Gordy	Kreature Lagoth; Looney's Tunez; Showmegod; King Wicked; Corvin's Breed; Mikey Rotten; A Killer's Confession; Kung Fu Vampire; Scythe Gang 666; Wakko The Kidd	Wildcard; The Unforgiven; Xeightysixedx; The Lap; Ummo

=== Ship of Fools Stage ===
Wednesday (August 14)	Thursday (August 15)	Saturday (August 16)	Sunday (August 17)
Dr. Gigglez; The Brimstone Lab; Psyko Circus; Jay Villain; Big Sherm; Rysk; Drawol; Kng Dzl; Molly Gruesome	NGS; Matt Foy; Flapjack Wilson; Apollo Exodus; Klockwerk E	Whack; Blake Lo; J Biz R; Enokh Xmortiz; Fro50187; Worldwide Chaos; Dirtboys; Bambam The Voodoo Chi7d; Bars	Hearse Boi; Nuclear Dysfunction; Ruthless Rob; Ninja God

=== The Slaughterhouse ===
Wednesday (August 14)	Thursday (August 15)	Saturday (August 16)	Sunday (August 17)
World's Most Dangerous Stunt Show; Chapter 17's Wicked Wicked Phonktion	Zac Amico; Wakko The Kidd's Wicked Shit Air Headz Extravaganza	Big Jay Oakerson; Clownvis Post-Apocalyptic Nuclear Meltdown Zombie Party	Mike E. Clark's Horrorcore Tomb of Horrors Party

== Professional wrestling production ==
Gathering of the Juggalos
- Promotion: Juggalo Championship Wrestling
- Date: August 15, 2024
- City: Garrettsville, Ohio
- Venue: Legend Valley

Juggalo Championship Wrestling event chronology
← Previous; Free-For-All	Next → Bloodymania 17

Gathering of the Juggalos chronology
← Previous; 2023	Next → 2025

=== Background ===
ince 2000, Juggalo Championship Wrestling has promoted professional wrestling matches at the annual Gathering of the Juggalos music festival organized by Psychopathic Records and the Insane Clown Posse. Pro wrestling matches at the Gathering would often feature several of JCW's regularly appearing wrestlers along with several special appearances from wrestlers like Sabu, Dusty Rhodes, Lenny Lane, Zach Gowen, Necro Butcher, and many more during its early years. On July 14, 2001, Sabu would win the JCW Heavyweight Championship in a battle royal at the Seagate Convention Centre in Toledo, Ohio. One day later, he would lose it to Vampiro who had been stripped of the title after he had stopped defending it. The 2001 Gathering also featured former World Wrestling Entertainment (WWE, At the time the World Wrestling Federation (WWF)) and World Championship Wrestling (WCW) champion Greg Valentine fighting against The Rude Boy in a dog collar match.

From July 22-24, 2005, JCW held three JCW vs. TNA shows during the Gathering at Nelson Ledges Quarry Park in Garrettsville, Ohio which saw several JCW wrestlers be pitted up against TNA wrestlers. Notable wrestlers who competed were Ron Killings, D-Ray 3000, Rhino, The Blue Meanie, America's Most Wanted (James Storm and Chris Harris), Abyss, Jeff Jarrett, Team Canada (A1 and Petey Williams), and Terry Funk. Terry Funk won the vacant JCW Heavyweight Championship during a battle royal at the event on July 23, 2005, however he ended up losing the belt to Mad Man Pondo the following day.

On August 12, 2007, JCW held the inaugural Bloodymania show which was built up on JCW's internet wrestling show SlamTV! at the Hog Rock Campgrounds in Cave-In-Rock, Illinois. This show would feature several notable wrestlers like Ultimo Dragon, Scott D'Amore, Abdullah The Butcher, Jake Roberts, Tracy Smothers, Brutus Beefcake, Akira Raijin, and Scott Hall. The show would later be released on DVD on October 30, 2007 as part of SlamTV! Part 2 (featuring episodes 10-15 including East Side Wars and Bloodymania) which featured the second half of the first season of SlamTV!.

On March 17, 2024, JCW announced the first tapings for their new show titled JCW Lunacy would take place on May 3, 2024 at the Newport Music Hall in Columbus, Ohio. Titled The Juggalos Strike Back, the show would feature various talent from the independent circuit, JCW's regular roster, All Elite Wrestling (AEW) talent, and talent from the National Wrestling Alliance (NWA). In addition to the premiere taping, JCW announced on May 20, 2024 that they would hold an additional taping at the Harpos Concert Theatre in Detroit, Michigan and would feature Matt Cardona and the debut of the Nu Backseat Boyz consisting of Tommy Grayson and JP Grayson with their manager Johnny Kashmere. On June 10, 2024, Juggalo Championship Wrestling announced that they would launch JCW Lunacy as a bi-weekly show and would feature talent from the National Wrestling Alliance (NWA), Major League Wrestling (MLW), Total Nonstop Action Wrestling (TNA), All Elite Wrestling (AEW), Lucha Libre AAA Worldwide (AAA), Big Japan Pro Wrestling (BJW), and the independent circuit alongside JCW's regular talent. However, the show's format would abruptly switch to a weekly format beginning on September 4, 2024.

=== Storylines ===
JCW's Gathering of the Juggalos events featured professional wrestling matches that involves different wrestlers from pre-existing scripted feuds and storylines. Wrestlers portrayed villains, heroes, or less distinguishable characters in scripted events that built tension and culminated in a wrestling match or series of matches. Storylines were produced on Juggalo Championship Wrestling's various events and on their weekly show, JCW Lunacy.

== Results ==
No.	Results	Stipulations
1	Matt Cross defeated N/A by pinfall	Singles match
2	Deputy Dickhead and Officer Colt Cabana defeated N/A and N/A by pinfall	Tag team match
3	Kongo Kong and Painful Paul defeated Mad Man Pondo and Nick Gage	Tag team match
4	Willie Mack (c) defeated Mecha Wolf by pinfall	Singles match for the JCW Heavyweight Championship
5	Caleb Konley defeated 2 Tuff Tony, Alex Taylor, Breyer Wellington, Chris Malvado, Deputy Dickhead, Dick Ramirez, Jeeves, JP Grayson, Kerry Morton, Kongo Kong, Matt Cross, MLB, Painful Paul, Super Beast, The Green Phantom, and Tommy Grayson	Battle royal for the vacant JCW American Championship
(c) / – the champion(s) heading into the match
