= Bloodymania 19 =

2026 Juggalo Championship Wrestling event

- Promotional poster
- Promotion: Juggalo Championship Wrestling
- Date: August 21, 2026
- City: Macks Creek, Missouri
- Venue: Mother Nature's Riverfront Retreat

Juggalo Championship Wrestling event chronology
← Previous; Gathering of the Juggalos	Next → 99 Rewind

Bloodymania chronology
← Previous; 18	Next → —

Bloodymania 19 was a professional wrestling livestreaming event produced by Juggalo Championship Wrestling (JCW). The event took place on August 21, 2026 at Mother Nature's Riverfront Retreat in Macks Creek, Missouri during the Gathering of the Juggalos and was streamed on YouTube.

== Production ==
Other on-screen personnel
Role:	Name:
Disc Jockey	DJ Clay
Commentators	Joe Dombrowski
Commentators	Mark Roberts
Commentators	Zac Amico
Commentators	Violent J (Main event)
Commentators	Shaggy 2 Dope (Main event)
Ring announcer	Kid Cadet
Interviewer	Mac Davis

=== Background ===
Since 2000, Juggalo Championship Wrestling has promoted professional wrestling matches at the annual Gathering of the Juggalos music festival organized by Psychopathic Records and the Insane Clown Posse. Pro wrestling matches at the Gathering often featured several of JCW's regularly appearing wrestlers along with several special appearances from wrestlers like Sabu, Dusty Rhodes, Lenny Lane, Zach Gowen, Necro Butcher, and many more during its early years. On July 14, 2001, Sabu won the JCW Heavyweight Championship in a battle royal at the Seagate Convention Centre in Toledo, Ohio. One day later, he lost it to Vampiro who had been stripped of the title after he had stopped defending it. The 2001 Gathering also featured former World Wrestling Entertainment (WWE; at the time, the World Wrestling Federation (WWF)) and World Championship Wrestling (WCW) champion Greg Valentine fighting against The Rude Boy in a dog collar match.

From July 22–24, 2005, JCW held three JCW vs. TNA shows during the Gathering at Nelson Ledges Quarry Park in Garrettsville, Ohio which saw several JCW wrestlers be pitted up against TNA wrestlers. Notable wrestlers who competed were Ron Killings, D-Ray 3000, Rhino, The Blue Meanie, America's Most Wanted (James Storm and Chris Harris), Abyss, Jeff Jarrett, Team Canada (A1 and Petey Williams), and Terry Funk. Terry Funk won the vacant JCW Heavyweight Championship during a battle royal at the event on July 23, 2005, however he ended up losing the belt to Mad Man Pondo the following day.

On August 12, 2007, JCW held the inaugural Bloodymania show which was built up on JCW's internet wrestling show SlamTV! at the Hog Rock Campgrounds in Cave-In-Rock, Illinois. This show featured several notable wrestlers like Ultimo Dragon, Scott D'Amore, Abdullah The Butcher, Jake Roberts, Tracy Smothers, Brutus Beefcake, Akira Raijin, and Scott Hall. The show was later be released on DVD on October 30, 2007 as part of SlamTV! Part 2 (featuring episodes 10-15 including East Side Wars and Bloodymania) which featured the second half of the first season of SlamTV!.

On August 14, 2011, Bloodymania 5 became the first Bloodymania to be aired live on internet pay-per-view at the Hog Rock Campground in Cave-In-Rock, Illinois. The show was headlined by Vampiro defending the JCW Heavyweight Championship against Mad Man Pondo.

On August 16, 2024, one match from Bloodymania 17 was taped and aired on the eighth episode of JCW Lunacy which aired on October 16, 2024.

From August 14, 2025 to August 15, 2025, JCW and Game Changer Wrestling (GCW) held the 2 Day War pay-per-view at Legend Valley in Thornville, Ohio as a culmination of a year-long feud which started in September 2025 and was headlined by the Brothers of Funstruction (Yabo The Clown and Ruffo The Clown) defending the JCW Tag Team Championship against YDNP (Jordan Oliver and Alec Price) who defended the GCW Tag Team Championship on night 1 and Matt Tremont defending the JCW Heavyweight Championship against 2 Tuff Tony on night 2.

On June 9, 2026, Psychopathic Records announced that Bloodymania 19 would take place at the 2026 Gathering of the Juggalos on August 21, 2026. On August 17, 2026, JCW announced that Gail Kim would make her JCW debut as a special guest referee for the JCW Women's Championship match at Bloodymania 19.

=== Storylines ===
Bloodymania 19 featured professional wrestling matches that involves different wrestlers from pre-existing scripted feuds and storylines. Wrestlers portrayed villains, heroes, or less distinguishable characters in scripted events that built tension and culminated in a wrestling match or series of matches. Storylines were produced on Juggalo Championship Wrestling's various events and on their weekly show, JCW Lunacy.

== Results ==
No.	Results	Stipulations	Times
1	Twisted Snow (James Storm and CoKane) defeated Steven Flowe and Shane Mercer (with The Ring Rat) by pinfall	Tag team grudge match	10:57
2	Alice Crowley defeated J-Rod and Haley J by pinfall	Three-way dance to determine the #1 contender to the JCW Women's Championship; Nyla Rose served as the special outside enforcer.	4:29
3	Choppa City (Atiba and Bruce Wayans) (c) defeated The Outbreak (Jacksyn Crowley and Abel Booker) by pinfall	Tag team match for the JCW World Tag Team Championship	7:33
4	Josh Bishop (with Joel Gertner) defeated Father Bronson and Facade by pinfall	Three-way dance	9:22
5	Dani Mo (c) defeated HoKane (with Barnabas the Bizarre) by pinfall	Singles match for the JCW Women's Championship; Gail Kim served as the special guest referee.	10:55
6	Caleb Konley (c) defeated Mr. Happy by pinfall	Singles match for the JCW World Heavyweight Championship	8:29
7	Juggalo World Order (2 Tuff Tony, Willie Mack, Jeeves, Ruffo The Clown, and EC3) (with Insane Clown Posse) defeated Team Luciano (Vincenzo, Sally Boy, Painful Paul, Krule, and Donovan Dijak) (with Big Vito and Jasmin St. Claire) by pinfall	GoreGames elimination match Mad Man Pondo served as the special guest referee.	12:42
(c) / – the champion(s) heading into the match
