= Gathering of the Juggalos 2025 =

2025 music festival organized by Psychopathic Records

- Promotional poster
- Date: August 13–16, 2025
- Venue: Legend Valley
- Locations: Thornville, Ohio, United States
- Previous event: 2024
- Next event: 2026
- Organizer: Psychopathic Records
- Website: juggalogathering.com

The 2025 Gathering of the Juggalos (also known as The Gathering or GOTJ and was nicknamed the Gathering of Legends) was a music festival organized by Psychopathic Records, a record label owned by the Detroit-based horrorcore hip-hop duo, the Insane Clown Posse. The festival took place from August 13 to August 16, 2025 at Legend Valley in Thornville, Ohio. The festival was also the site of the JCW vs. GCW: The 2 Day War pay-per-view which took place on August 14–15, 2025.

== Background ==
The Gathering of the Juggalos was created in 1999 when Rob Bruce, also known by his stagename "Jumpsteady", organized an event for all Juggalos, a concept long talked about by Insane Clown Posse. The first Gathering took place in Novi, Michigan at the Novi Expo Center on July 21–22, 2000, with roughly 2,000 fans in attendance. The festival featured concert performances, autograph sessions, seminars, wrestling hosted by Juggalo Championshxt Wrestling (JCW), tattooing, a haunted house, video games, contests, an ICP memorabilia museum and more. The second Gathering took place from July 13–15, 2001 at the Seagate Convention Centre in Toledo, Ohio. The event was controversially ended when the Toledo Police Department cut the Insane Clown Posse's concert at the festival short on July 15, 2001 which resulted in a riot.

During the 2002 Gathering of the Juggalos, a riot had broken out between 1,000 attendees and police that was caused by officers arresting a woman in the exhibit hall for baring her breasts. Tear gas, rubber bullets, and pepper spray were released into the crowd, however, representatitives from Psychopathic Records were able to negotiate with the police and the festival continued 30 minutes after the riot started.

During the 2004 Gathering, the hip-hop group Bone Thugs-n-Harmony held a surprise reunion concert on the opening night.

Cave-In-Rock, Illinois also hosted the eighth Gathering of the Juggalos at Hogrock Campgrounds on August 9–12, 2007, with over 8,000 fans attending the four-day event. Like the previous year, over 100 bands were featured. Performances on the main and second stages included Ying Yang Twins, Necro, Haystak, Zug Izland, Prozak, Mushroomhead, and Insane Poetry. Comedians included Joey Gay. Bloodymania, the culmination of Juggalo Championship Wrestling's web show, SlamTV!, debuted at the event. Anybody Killa was also announced to have signed back with Psychopathic Records.

Cave-In-Rock also hosted the ninth Gathering of the Juggalos on August 7–10, 2008, which included guest performances by Afroman, Andrew W.K., Ice-T, and Bizarre. Both Bloodymania II and the debut of Oddball Wrestling was presented by Juggalo Championship Wrestling. The Gathering was filmed by Psychopathic Video for the documentary A Family Underground, which was released on May 12, 2009.

The tenth Gathering of the Juggalos August 6–9, 2009, had the largest attendance in Gathering history with over 20,000 people. Over 120 musical artists performed at the event, including Ice Cube, Gwar, Coolio, and Scarface. During their set, Insane Clown Posse debuted the songs "Juggalo Island" and "Bang! Pow! Boom!" from their then-upcoming album Bang! Pow! Boom! Juggalo Championship Wrestling hosted Bloodymania III, Oddball Wrestling, and Flashlight Wrestling. Stand-up comedians included Jimmie Walker and Pauly Shore. The trailer for Big Money Rustlas also premiered during the event, where it was screened twice.

In honor of the Western comedy film Big Money Rustlas being released at the following event, the eleventh Gathering of the Juggalos, August 12-15, 2010, featured a "Best in the West" West Coast hip hop theme. Guest performances include Naughty by Nature, Spice 1, Method Man & Redman, Above the Law, and Warren G. A "Ladies' Night", hosted by Sugar Slam, featured performances by Kisa, Lil V, Ill E. Gal, and Tila Tequila. Shaggy 2 Dope hosted "Shaggy's Old School Super Jam", featuring DJing by 2 Dope and performances by Tone Lōc and Rob Base. Comedy was provided by Tom Green, Gallagher, and Ron Jeremy. During the festival, performers Method Man and Tila Tequila suffered facial lacerations as a result of objects that were hurled at them from the crowd. Both performers remained on stage, but, Tila Tequila suffered the worst reaction from the crowd with reports that indicated that several attendees in the crowd had threw various objects (including feces), in her direction. Method man suffered a cut on his face, but continued the set and eventually won over the crowd. Five wrestling shows were booked for the event; Bloodymania IV, two Flashlight Wrestling events, a Half Pint Brawlers event, and Oddball Wrestling.

The twelfth annual Gathering of the Juggalos August 11–14, 2011, debuted the use of a celebrity host for each night's main stage with Dustin Diamond, Jumpsteady, Charlie Sheen, and Flavor Flav. Guest acts included artists Busta Rhymes, Mystikal, Juvenile, Lil Jon, George Clinton and Parliament-Funkadelic, Saliva, Ice Cube, Xzibit, and Paris. All of the main stage performances, as well as the wrestling events Bloodymania 5 and Legends & Icons, were broadcast live on internet pay-per-view. It was also announced that Vanilla Ice had signed with Psychopathic Records.

The thirteenth annual gathering took place from August 8–12, 2012, in Cave-In-Rock and featured Insane Clown Posse, Twiztid, Psychopathic Rydas, Dark Lotus, Blaze Ya Dead Homie, ABK, comedian Ralphie May, DJ Clay, Mike E. Clark, and Cold 187 AKA Big Hutch. Some other guest artists and groups included Tech N9ne, The Pharcyde, Soulfly, Fear Factory, Cheech & Chong, Danny Brown, Slaine, ¡Mayday! & the Geto Boys. A volume of photographs by Daniel Cronin from the event has been published, showing predominantly the people attending the event, not the performers.

The fourteenth annual gathering took place from August 7–11, 2013, in Cave-In-Rock. This was also the final time that the Gathering would be held in Cave-In-Rock. During the festival, it was reported that a 24-year-old man was found dead in a tent at the festival. Also during the event, authorities had made 6 arrests including two suspected drug busts and reported that there were 10 overdoses at the event.

In February 2014, it was announced that the Gathering would be moving from its home at Cave-in-Rock to a family Campground in Kaiser, Missouri. However, several local citizens vigorously protested the Gathering being held in this location and the event had to be moved once more. It was reported by Insane Clown Posse themselves that locals had started a petition to keep the Gathering out of their area and flooded the owners of the campground with angry phone calls. Finally, a self-professed Juggalo referred to as Steve (who had previously been to the Gathering himself) contacted Psychopathic Records and offered the 120-acre Legend Valley as a place to host the event. Legend Valley (located in Thornville, Ohio) was officially chosen as the Gathering's venue for 2014. In a statement by Psychopathic Records in the February 28, 2014 edition of the Hatchet Herald, it was said that "Mere hours after the news begin spreading that Kaiser, Missouri would not welcome the Juggalo Family, we began receiving phone calls and emails from interested land owners and promoters who wanted to help ensure that the Gathering of the Juggalos found a home. One of the calls we got was from a down-ass ninja named Steve who owns the Legend Valley. [...] Steve has actually been to the Gathering of the Juggalos before and is not buying into the media's portrayal of what the Gathering is because he has been there. He has expressed to us that he is super down to host the Gathering this year and has always found Juggalos to be cool ass people. He also believes in our fight alongside the ACLU to have Juggalos removed from the FBI gang list, which is still on the list as a "loosely organized hybrid gang" because their sorry ass case was thrown out of court in 2014. In other words, he has our backs and is the perfect ninja we needed to ensure an awesome, trouble-free Gathering this year."

Legend Valley in Thornville, Ohio hosted the fifteenth annual Gathering of the Juggalos, which took place between July 23, 2014, and July 26, 2014. Advertised as "Shangri-La on Earth", this Gathering has over 70 artists scheduled to perform, including the entire Psychopathic Records roster and several notable guests such as Twiztid, Blaze Ya Dead Homie, Cypress Hill, Cannibal Corpse, Kottonmouth Kings, Tech N9ne, Da Mafia 6ix, and other artists. Also scheduled to perform are several comedians, including (most notably) Gilbert Gottfried. Three special parties are planned for the gathering: Kuma's Psychopathic All-Star Party, DJ Clay's Horney Nuts and Big Butts Party, and the Frothy Murder Mix Foam Party. Alongside all these events will be dance competitions, several contests, and Juggalo Championship Wrestling events (including JCW's Road to Bloodymania and Bloodymania 8), plus carnival rides, the annual ICP seminar, auctions, and more. In addition, it was announced via the Insane Clown Posse's Twitter account that there was to be a new Dark Lotus album slated for the 2014 Gathering.

It was announced at the Insane Clown Posse seminar at Legend Valley that the Gathering of the Juggalos would be held in Colorado in 2017. However, on April 11, 2017. Faygoluvers.net announced that would the 2017 edition of the Gathering was going to be held in Oklahoma City, Oklahoma at the Lost Lakes Amphitheater from July 26–29, 2017.

In 2018, the Gathering returned to Legend Valley on July 18–21. nicknamed "Whoopstock", the festival featured several notable musicians alongside Psychopathic Records' roster including Jelly Roll, Yelawolf, Hopsin, and Gwar. During the festival, several tribute bands themed after the Grateful Dead, Jimi Hendrix, Santana, and Janis Joplin also performed.

== Performer lineup ==
The lineup for the 2025 Gathering of the Juggalos included several notable names including Psychopathic Records artists DJ Clay, Ouija Macc and Wakko The Kidd, hip-hop group ¡Mayday!, rap-metal band Motown Rage, Chapter 17 Records musicians Shaggy The Airhead, Darby O'Trill, and HEXXX, BET Award-winning rapper Waka Flocka Flame, The Three 6 Mafia, and MTVU Music Award-winning rapper Tech N9ne. The event was headlined by Insane Clown Posse who performed two sets. A normal set and a Shangri-La Tour throwback set. The festival also featured stand-up comedy from Big Jay Oakerson, Zac Amico, Tim Butterfly, Luis J. Gomez, Ali Musa, Ro The Realest, and Clownvis.

=== Legendary Stage ===
Wednesday (August 13)	Thursday (August 14)	Saturday (August 15)	Sunday (August 16)
Tierre Diaz; Motown Rage; Odd Squad Family; Onyx; R.A. the Rugged Man; ¡MAYDAY!	Normundy; King Iso; ¡MAYDAY!; Waka Flocka Flame; Insane Clown Posse	Fight from Within; Wakko The Kidd; Ill Bill; Tech N9ne; Ouija Macc	Stacc Styles; Smile on the Sinner; Immortal Technique; Bone Thugs-n-Harmony; Three 6 Mafia; Insane Clown Posse's Shangri-La Tour throwback show

=== Iconic Stage ===
Wednesday (August 13)	Thursday (August 14)	Saturday (August 15)	Sunday (August 16)
Worldwide Panic; Mad Maxxx; Wild Bill; Wiked Wood; Bond Breakr; Sinizter; Bodies Below Sea Level; Hatchet Mountain Rising; The Convalescence; Thicc Criss; Mary Tyler Whores; Midnightinyami; Green Jelly	Sewerside; Vlad’s Skeletal Circus; Skitzo; K7 Army; Siamese Goat God; Redburn; Mushroomhead; Freewill; Kottonmouth Kings; Darby O’Trill	Squid Pisser; Gloom; Mantra of Morta; Resistor; Foty Oz; Saving Vice; ShaggyTheAirhead; Champtown and the Big and Stout Band; Myzery	Charlie Classic; Al Mal; Actus Reus; Donnie Menace; Set for the Fall

=== Detonation Stage ===
Wednesday (August 13)	Thursday (August 14)	Saturday (August 15)	Sunday (August 16)
Antzy & Damone; Jason Mask Da Booth; Hellz Bellz; Black Magic The Infidel; Evol Stephen; Nino Light & J Payne; Probemattik; Fury; Razortung; Sam Astaroth; Nada; Acetone Boogie; BPTF; Shade	That Boi Jonesy; Tony Bone; Gavin Gunn; Double Homicide; Knowledge Da Mic; Ginjabred; Bluntfield; Will E. Haze; Falling Under; McNaster; Sorry 4 Yellin; Abe Linke'd' N; Keagan Grimm; Zigzay	Celtixx; GG Esko; Trikkd Out; Swanger; Get Moneyyy; Big Brutal; Freeky Da Pimp; Skeezus; Dread; Lie in Wait; Zombie Cult; Brotherhoodx	T3mpo Tai; JDirty; Underworld Assassins; Koat Records; Tha Dumpster Babies; Bloodshot Mafia

=== Epic Tent ===
Thursday (August 14)	Saturday (August 15)	Sunday (August 16)
Killer Comedy Hour feat. Ali Musa, Ro The Realest, and Clownvis	Night of Comedy feat. Big Jay Oakerson, Zac Amico, Tim Butterfly, and Luis J. Gomez; Clownmageddon hosted by Clownvis feat. DJ Bobby Blaze	Iced Out, Lights Out Gathering of the Juggalos after-party feat. Shaggy The Airhead and Deveredaux

== JCW Lunacy: Gathering of the Juggalos ==
JCW Lunacy: Gathering of the Juggalos
- Promotional poster featuring members of the Juggalo Championship Wrestling roster and Violent J
- Promotion: Juggalo Championship Wrestling
- Date: August 12, 2025
- City: Thornville, Ohio
- Venue: Legend Valley

Juggalo Championship Wrestling event chronology
← Previous; Powder Keg	Next → JCW vs. GCW: The 2 Day War

Gathering of the Juggalos chronology
← Previous; 2024	Next → 2026

JCW Lunacy: Gathering of the Juggalos was a professional wrestling livestreaming event produced by Juggalo Championship Wrestling (JCW). The event took place on August 12, 2025 at Legend Valley in Thornville, Ohio and was streamed live on YouTube, Twitch, Facebook, and Triller TV.

=== Production ===
Other on-screen personnel
Role:	Name:
Disc Jockey	DJ Clay
Commentators	Joe Dombrowski
Commentators	Mark Roberts
Commentators	Zac Amico
Commentators	Violent J
Ring announcers	The Ringmaster

==== Background ====
Since 2000, Juggalo Championship Wrestling has promoted professional wrestling matches at the annual Gathering of the Juggalos music festival organized by Psychopathic Records and the Insane Clown Posse. Pro wrestling matches at the Gathering often featured several of JCW's regularly appearing wrestlers along with several special appearances from wrestlers like Sabu, Dusty Rhodes, Lenny Lane, Zach Gowen, Necro Butcher, and many more during its early years. On July 14, 2001, Sabu won the JCW Heavyweight Championship in a battle royal at the Seagate Convention Centre in Toledo, Ohio. One day later, he lost it to Vampiro who had been stripped of the title after he had stopped defending it. The 2001 Gathering also featured former World Wrestling Entertainment (WWE, At the time the World Wrestling Federation (WWF)) and World Championship Wrestling (WCW) champion Greg Valentine fighting against The Rude Boy in a dog collar match.

From July 22-24, 2005, JCW held three JCW vs. TNA shows during the Gathering at Nelson Ledges Quarry Park in Garrettsville, Ohio which saw several JCW wrestlers be pitted up against TNA wrestlers. Notable wrestlers who competed were Ron Killings, D-Ray 3000, Rhino, The Blue Meanie, America's Most Wanted (James Storm and Chris Harris), Abyss, Jeff Jarrett, Team Canada (A1 and Petey Williams), and Terry Funk. Terry Funk won the vacant JCW Heavyweight Championship during a battle royal at the event on July 23, 2005, however he ended up losing the belt to Mad Man Pondo the following day.

==== Storylines ====
JCW's Gathering of the Juggalos events featured professional wrestling matches that involves different wrestlers from pre-existing scripted feuds and storylines. Wrestlers portrayed villains, heroes, or less distinguishable characters in scripted events that built tension and culminated in a wrestling match or series of matches. Storylines were produced on Juggalo Championship Wrestling's various events and on their weekly show, JCW Lunacy.

On September 14, 2024, at Game Changer Wrestling's Bad One pay-per-view in Detroit, Violent J of Insane Clown Posse accompanied a six-man tag team consisting of 2 Tuff Tony, Breyer Wellington, and Mad Man Pondo against Thrunt (1 Called Manders, Dark Sheik, and Effy) in a six man tag team match. Despite losing the match, Violent J issued a challenge to GCW to a "2 day war" at the Gathering of the Juggalos the following year. After several exhibition matches between the two sides, Violent J accompanied 2 Tuff Tony and the Backseat Boyz (Tommy Grayson and JP Grayson) to The People vs. GCW kickoff show at the Hammerstein Ballroom in New York City on January 21, 2025 in a pre-show rumble. 2 Tuff Tony was the fourth wrestler to be eliminated on the rumble after he was eliminated by former JCW Heavyweight Champion, Shane Mercer.

A JCW exhibition six man tag team match between the Backseat Boyz (Tommy Grayson and JP Grayson) and The Wraith against Dani Mo and the Brothers of Funstruction (Yabo The Clown and Ruffo The Clown) took place on GCW's Amerikaz Most Wanted pay-per-view on March 30, 2025 in Sauget, Illinois which featured Violent J on commentary along with JCW's ring announcer, The Ringmaster. Violent J accompanied 2 Tuff Tony and Mickie Knuckles who fought against The Rejects (John Wayne Murdoch and Reed Bentley) in the main event of the show. After Amerikaz Most Wanted had ended, a riot had broken out on stage during a Violent J post-show concert where the GCW and JCW wrestlers brawled on stage during the concert and backstage.

On April 20, 2025, during the Joey Janela's Spring Break: Clusterf**k Forever pay-per-view, Mickie Knuckles, 2 Tuff Tony, the Brothers of Funstruction (Yabo The Clown and Ruffo The Clown), the Backseat Boyz (Tommy Grayson and JP Grayson), and Dani Mo entered into the Clusterf**k Battle Royal representing JCW in which they had taken control of the ring for a brief period before Matt Tremont, Bam Sullivan, Big Joe, Lou Nixon, Dr. Redacted, and John Wayne Murdoch entered as Team GCW and brawked backstage during the match.

On the May 1, 2025 episode of JCW Lunacy, Effy made his debut in JCW in which he defeated Disco Ray. Several more GCW wrestlers made appearances on various Lunacy episodes in which Joey Janela, Matt Tremont, Jimmy Lloyd, and Sonny Kiss were regularly featured in various matches representing GCW.

During GCW's Cage of Survival 4 pay-per-view on June 8, 2025 at Showboat Atlantic City in Atlantic City, New Jersey, an eight man tag team match was scheduled between Team JCW (2 Tuff Tony, Mickie Knuckles, Ruffo The Clown, and Yabo The Clown) against Team GCW (Effy, Jimmy Lloyd, John Wayne Murdoch, and Matt Tremont) in which the match was thrown out and escalate into a riot which spread from the venue to the streets outside the Showboat.

On July 4, 2025 during GCW's Backyard Wrestling 7, Tommy Grayson of the Backseat Boyz suffered an ankle injury during a match against YDNP (Alec Price and Jordan Oliver), forcing him to be sidelined from wrestling in the months leading up to the Gathering. He was replaced on the card for JCW's Powder Keg pay-per-view with Shane Mercer and Matt Cross on the 2 Day War.

On July 17, 2025, JCW and GCW held a pay-per-view event titled GCW x JCW Showcase Showdown: The Violence is Right in which the main event was Mad Man Pondo defending the JCW Heavyweight Championship against Matt Tremont in a death match. During the match, GCW owner Brett Lauderdale intervened and resulted in Tremont winning the title for the first time.

On August 2, 2025 during JCW's Powder Keg pay-per-view in Rutherford, New Jersey, John Wayne Murdoch was set on fire during a match where he teamed with 1 Called Manders and Matt Tremont against the team of JCW Hall of Famers represented by 2 Tuff Tony, Mad Man Pondo, and Mickie Knuckles. At the end of the match, Murdoch was set on fire after being suplexed through a burning table by Pondo. The match was declared a no contest as a result. The stunt had forced him to be rushed to the hospital after the show.

=== Results ===
No.	Results	Stipulations	Times
1	Matt Cross defeated The Wraith by pinfall	Singles match	3:33
2	St. Claire Monster Corporation (Kongo Kong and Mr. Happy) (with Jasmin St. Claire) defeated Flowe Caine (Cocaine and Steven Flowe) by pinfall	Tag team match	6:50
3	Caleb Konley (with Jeeves) (c) defeated Breyer Wellington	Singles match for the JCW American Championship	4:56
4	The Outbreak (Abel Booker and Jacksyn Crowley) (with Barnabas The Bizarre) defeated Camp Counselor Mike Voorhees and Miles Clark	Tag team match	5:26
5	Shane Mercer defeated Luigi Primo	Singles match	4:09
6	Alice Crowley and JP Grayson (with Tommy Grayson) defeated 2 Tuff Tony and Haley J	Tag team match	10:06
7	Willie Mack defeated Marcus Mathers	Singles match	7:35
(c) / – the champion(s) heading into the match

== Aftermath ==
On April 3, 2026, Insane Clown Posse announced on their social media accounts that the Gathering was leaving Legend Valley for Mother Nature’s Riverfront Retreat in Macks Creek, Missouri.
