= JCW 99 Rewind =

2026 Juggalo Championship Wrestling event

99 Rewind
- Promotional poster
- Promotion: Juggalo Championship Wrestling
- Date: September 17, 2026
- City: New Baltimore, Michigan
- Venue: Diesel Concert Lounge

Juggalo Championship Wrestling event chronology
| ← Previous; Bloodymania 19 | Next → Carnival of Chaos |

Other on-screen personnel
| Role: | Name: |
|---|---|
| Commentators | Joe Dombrowski |
| Commentators | Mark Roberts |
| Ring announcer | Kid Cadet |

99 Rewind, also referred to as JCW Lunacy: 99 Rewind, was a professional wrestling livestreaming event produced by Juggalo Championship Wrestling (JCW). It took place on September 17, 2026 at the Diesel Concert Lounge in New Baltimore, Michigan and was streamed live on YouTube.

== Production ==
=== Background ===
On May 3, 2024, JCW taped its first four episodes of JCW Lunacy at the Newport Music Hall in Columbus, Ohio. Titled The Juggalos Strike Back, the show featured various talent from the independent circuit, JCW's regular roster, All Elite Wrestling (AEW) talent, and talent from the National Wrestling Alliance (NWA). In addition to the premiere taping, JCW taped an additional four episodes at the Harpos Concert Theatre in Detroit, Michigan on June 22, 2024 which featured the debuts of Matt Cardona and the Nu Backseat Boyz consisting of Tommy and JP Grayson with their manager Johnny Kashmere On August 28, 2024, JCW aired the first episode of Lunacy on YouTube which featured a promo from Violent J of the Insane Clown Posse and also featured Joe Galli and Manny Fresh on commentary. From October 23, 2024 to October 29, 2024, JCW streamed seven live Lunacy episodes as part of their build up to the Devil's Night Creature Double Feature pay-per-view on the Train of Terror Tour.

On August 12, 2025, JCW streamed its first live Gathering of the Juggalos episode at Legend Valley in Thornville, Ohio as part of the build up to the JCW vs. GCW: The 2 Day War pay-per-view which featured talent representing JCW and Game Changer Wrestling (GCW).

On the November 6, 2025 episode of Lunacy which was taped on October 20, 2025, Big Vito would make his JCW debut when he was revealed as the enforcer of a "mystery investor". Vito continued to make appearances and butt heads with Violent J until the debut of the "mystery investor". On October 26, 2025, Vince Russo, a high-profile pro wrestling writer and booker, was announced as an on-screen investor in JCW and would take up the role of the lead writer for the promotion.

On the August 20, 2026 episode of Lunacy, Mad Man Pondo made his JCW return after an eight month absence following a match with Mosh Pit Mike and served as a special guest referee for several matches on various events including Bloodymania 19 and several Lunacy tapings. On September 3, 2026, JCW announced the 99 Rewind event which would take place on September 17, 2026 at in New Baltimore, Michigan. In addition to this announcement, JCW announced that they would be releasing a comic book during the event along with a new Violent J solo single titled The Lunacy Lunatic during the event with only 1,000 copies of the single being handed out to attendees. On the September 10, 2026 episode of Lunacy, JCW announced that Violent J, Mark Roberts, and Joe Dombrowski would be the hosts for the event.

=== Storylines ===
99 Rewind featured professional wrestling matches that involves different wrestlers from pre-existing scripted feuds and storylines. Wrestlers portrayed villains, heroes, or less distinguishable characters in scripted events that built tension and culminated in a wrestling match or series of matches. Storylines were produced on Juggalo Championship Wrestling's various events and on their weekly internet show JCW Lunacy.

== Results ==
| No. | Results | Stipulations | Times |
|---|---|---|---|
| 1 | Steven Flowe (with The Ring Rat) defeated Breyer Wellington and Jeeves by pinfall | Triple threat match | 3:38 |
| 2 | Alice Crowley defeated Rae Larson by pinfall | Singles match | 4:21 |
| 3 | 2 Tuff Tony and CoKane defeated The Backseat Boyz (Tommy Grayson and JP Grayson) by pinfall | Tag team match Mad Man Pondo served as the special guest referee. | 10:15 |
