= Bloodymania 8 =

- Promotional poster
- Promotion: Juggalo Championship Wrestling
- Date: July 26, 2014
- City: Thornville, Ohio
- Venue: Legend Valley

Bloodymania chronology
← Previous; Bloodymania 7	Next → Bloodymania 9

Bloodymania 8 was a professional wrestling event produced by Juggalo Championship Wrestling (JCW). The event took place on July 26, 2014 at Legend Valley in Thornville, Ohio during the Gathering of the Juggalos.

== Production ==
=== Background ===
Other on-screen personnel
Role:	Name:
Disc Jockey	DJ Clay
Commentators	Kevin Gill
Commentators	Shaggy 2 Dope

Since 2000, Juggalo Championship Wrestling has promoted professional wrestling matches at the annual Gathering of the Juggalos music festival organized by Psychopathic Records and the Insane Clown Posse. Pro wrestling matches at the Gathering would often feature several of JCW's regularly appearing wrestlers along with several special appearances from wrestlers like Sabu, Dusty Rhodes, Lenny Lane, Zach Gowen, Necro Butcher, and many more during its early years. On July 14, 2001, Sabu would win the JCW Heavyweight Championship in a battle royal at the Seagate Convention Centre in Toledo, Ohio. One day later, he would lose it to Vampiro who had been stripped of the title after he had stopped defending it. The 2001 Gathering also featured former World Wrestling Entertainment (WWE; at the time, the World Wrestling Federation (WWF)) and World Championship Wrestling (WCW) champion Greg Valentine fighting against The Rude Boy in a dog collar match.

From July 22-24, 2005, JCW held three JCW vs. TNA shows during the Gathering at Nelson Ledges Quarry Park in Garrettsville, Ohio which saw several JCW wrestlers be pitted up against TNA wrestlers. Notable wrestlers who competed were Ron Killings, D-Ray 3000, Rhino, The Blue Meanie, America's Most Wanted (James Storm and Chris Harris), Abyss, Jeff Jarrett, Team Canada (A1 and Petey Williams), and Terry Funk. Terry Funk won the vacant JCW Heavyweight Championship during a battle royal at the event on July 23, 2005; however, Funk ended up losing the belt to Mad Man Pondo the following day.

On August 12, 2007, JCW held the inaugural Bloodymania show which was built up on JCW's internet wrestling show SlamTV! at the Hog Rock Campgrounds in Cave-In-Rock, Illinois. This show featured several notable wrestlers like Ultimo Dragon, Scott D'Amore, Abdullah The Butcher, Jake Roberts, Tracy Smothers, Brutus Beefcake, Akira Raijin, and Scott Hall. The show was later released on DVD on October 30, 2007 as part of SlamTV! Part 2 (featuring episodes 10-15 including East Side Wars and Bloodymania); it featured the second half of the first season of SlamTV!.

In April 2011, JCW and Highspots released footage from Bloodymania IV on DVD along with two Flashlight Wrestling shows and Oddball Wrestling which took place at the 2010 Gathering of the Juggalos.

On August 14, 2011, Bloodymania 5 became the first Bloodymania to be aired live on internet pay-per-view at the Hog Rock Campground in Cave-In-Rock, Illinois. The show was headlined by Vampiro defending the JCW Heavyweight Championship against Mad Man Pondo.

=== Storylines ===
Bloodymania 8 featured professional wrestling matches that involves different wrestlers from pre-existing scripted feuds and storylines. Wrestlers portrayed villains, heroes, or less distinguishable characters in scripted events that built tension and culminated in a wrestling match or series of matches. Storylines were produced on Juggalo Championship Wrestling's various events.

== Results ==
No.	Results	Stipulations
1	Kongo Kong defeated Necro Butcher by pinfall	Steel cage match
2	Hy-Zaya, Shockwave The Robot, The Weedman, and Zach Gowen defeated The Haters (Pauly Thomaselli and Vito Thomaselli), Breyer Wellington, and Jimmy Jacobs by pinfall	Eight-man tag team match
3	The Ring Rydas (Ring Ryda Blue and Ring Ryda Red) defeated The Hooligans (Devin Cutter and Mason Cutter) (c) by pinfall	Tag team match for the JCW Tag Team Championship
4	Mosh Pit Mike defeated Austin Bradley, Eric Darkstorm, Jesse Amato, Jewells Malone, John Wayne Murdoch, Josh Crow, Markus Crane, Ron Mathis, Ruff Crossing, Smokey C, Strict-9, and Terex	Unlucky 13 juggalos bring the weapons Royal Rumble match
5	The Boogeyman defeated Officer Colt Cabana	Singles match
6	Mad Man Pondo and Mary Dobson defeated Heidi Lovelace and Shane Mercer by pinfall	Tag team match
7	2 Tuff Tony (c) defeated Tommy Dreamer by pinfall	Singles match for the JCW Heavyweight Championship
(c) / – the champion(s) heading into the match
