= Bloodymania 10 =

2016 Juggalo Championship Wrestling event

- Promotional poster
- Promotion: Juggalo Championship Wrestling
- Date: July 22, 2016
- City: Thornville, Ohio
- Venue: Legend Valley

Bloodymania chronology
← Previous; Bloodymania 9	Next → Bloodymania 11

Bloodymania 10 was a professional wrestling event produced by Juggalo Championship Wrestling (JCW). The event took place on July 22, 2016 at Legend Valley in Thornville, Ohio during the Gathering of the Juggalos.

== Production ==
=== Background ===
Since 2000, Juggalo Championship Wrestling has promoted professional wrestling matches at the annual Gathering of the Juggalos music festival organized by Psychopathic Records and the Insane Clown Posse. Pro wrestling matches at the Gathering would often feature several of JCW's regularly appearing wrestlers along with several special appearances from wrestlers like Sabu, Dusty Rhodes, Lenny Lane, Zach Gowen, Necro Butcher, and many more during its early years. On July 14, 2001, Sabu would win the JCW Heavyweight Championship in a battle royal at the Seagate Convention Centre in Toledo, Ohio. One day later, he would lose it to Vampiro; Vampiro had been stripped of the title after he had stopped defending it. The 2001 Gathering also featured former World Wrestling Entertainment (WWE; at the time, the World Wrestling Federation (WWF)) and World Championship Wrestling (WCW) champion Greg Valentine fighting against The Rude Boy in a dog collar match.

From July 22-24, 2005, JCW held three JCW vs. TNA shows during the Gathering at Nelson Ledges Quarry Park in Garrettsville, Ohio which saw several JCW wrestlers be pitted up against TNA wrestlers. Notable wrestlers who competed were Ron Killings, D-Ray 3000, Rhino, The Blue Meanie, America's Most Wanted (James Storm and Chris Harris), Abyss, Jeff Jarrett, Team Canada (A1 and Petey Williams), and Terry Funk. Terry Funk won the vacant JCW Heavyweight Championship during a battle royal at the event on July 23, 2005, however ended up losing the belt to Mad Man Pondo the following day.

On August 12, 2007, JCW held the inaugural Bloodymania show which was built up on JCW's internet wrestling show SlamTV! at the Hog Rock Campgrounds in Cave-In-Rock, Illinois. This show featured several notable wrestlers like Ultimo Dragon, Scott D'Amore, Abdullah The Butcher, Jake Roberts, Tracy Smothers, Brutus Beefcake, Akira Raijin, and Scott Hall. The show was later released on DVD on October 30, 2007 as part of SlamTV! Part 2 (featuring episodes 10-15 including East Side Wars and Bloodymania) which featured the second half of the first season of SlamTV!.

In April 2011, JCW and Highspots released footage from Bloodymania IV on DVD along with two Flashlight Wrestling shows and Oddball Wrestling.

On August 14, 2011, Bloodymania 5 became the first Bloodymania to be aired live on internet pay-per-view at the Hog Rock Campground in Cave-In-Rock, Illinois. The show was headlined by Vampiro defending the JCW Heavyweight Championship against Mad Man Pondo.

On December 11, 2015 during the Incredible Rassle Rap Charity Tour, the Ring Rydas were defeated by Spider Monkey and Super Strong Tiger; the latter became the JCW Tag Team Champions.

=== Storylines ===
JCW's Gathering of the Juggalos events featured professional wrestling matches that involves different wrestlers from pre-existing scripted feuds and storylines. Wrestlers portrayed villains, heroes, or less distinguishable characters in scripted events that built tension and culminated in a wrestling match or series of matches. Storylines were produced on Juggalo Championship Wrestling's various events.

== Results ==
No.	Results	Stipulations
1	The War Child defeated Hy-Zaya, Matt Cross, and Shane Mercer by pinfall	Four-way match
2	Crazy Mary Dobson defeated Samantha Heights by pinfall	Singles match
3	Chuey Martinez defeated Mad Man Pondo and Mosh Pit Mike by pinfall	Three-way hardcore match
4	Swoggle defeated Officer Colt Cabana by pinfall	Singles match
5	2 Tuff Tony and Tommy Dreamer defeated Ruff Crossing and Shigehiro Irie by pinfall	Tag team match
6	The Ring Rydas (Ring Ryda Blue and Ring Ryda Red) defeated Spider Monkey and Super Strong Tiger (c), The Hooligans (Devin Cutter and Mason Cutter), and The Viking War Party (The American Viking and The Little Viking) by pinfall	Four-way tables, ladders, and chairs match for the JCW Tag Team Championship
7	2 Tuff Tony, Rude Boy, and Violent J defeated The Rednecks (N/A, N/A, and N/A) by pinfall	Six-man tag team match
8	Kongo Kong (c) defeated Jeff Hardy and Willie Mack by pinfall	Three-way match for the JCW Heavyweight Championship
(c) / – the champion(s) heading into the match
