= Bloodymania 17 =

2024 Juggalo Championship Wrestling event

- Promotional poster
- Promotion: Juggalo Championship Wrestling
- Date: August 16, 2024
- City: Thornville, Ohio
- Venue: Legend Valley

Juggalo Championship Wrestling event chronology
← Previous; Gathering of the Juggalos	Next → Train of Terror Tour

Bloodymania chronology
← Previous; 16	Next → 18

Bloodymania 17 was a professional wrestling event produced by Juggalo Championship Wrestling (JCW). The event took place on August 16, 2024 at Legend Valley in Thornville, Ohio during the Gathering of the Juggalos. One match from the event was aired on the eighth episode of JCW Lunacy on YouTube.

== Production ==
=== Background ===
Since 2000, Juggalo Championship Wrestling has promoted professional wrestling matches at the annual Gathering of the Juggalos music festival organized by Psychopathic Records and the Insane Clown Posse. Pro wrestling matches at the Gathering would often feature several of JCW's regularly appearing wrestlers along with several special appearances from wrestlers like Sabu, Dusty Rhodes, Lenny Lane, Zach Gowen, Necro Butcher, and many more during its early years. On July 14, 2001, Sabu would win the JCW Heavyweight Championship in a battle royal at the Seagate Convention Centre in Toledo, Ohio. One day later, he would lose it to Vampiro who had been stripped of the title after he had stopped defending it. The 2001 Gathering also featured former World Wrestling Entertainment (WWE; at the time, the World Wrestling Federation (WWF)) and World Championship Wrestling (WCW) champion Greg Valentine fighting against The Rude Boy in a dog collar match.

From July 22-24, 2005, JCW held three JCW vs. TNA shows during the Gathering at Nelson Ledges Quarry Park in Garrettsville, Ohio which saw several JCW wrestlers be pitted up against TNA wrestlers. Notable wrestlers who competed were Ron Killings, D-Ray 3000, Rhino, The Blue Meanie, America's Most Wanted (James Storm and Chris Harris), Abyss, Jeff Jarrett, Team Canada (A1 and Petey Williams), and Terry Funk. Terry Funk won the vacant JCW Heavyweight Championship during a battle royal at the event on July 23, 2005, however ended up losing the belt to Mad Man Pondo the following day.

On August 12, 2007, JCW held the inaugural Bloodymania show which was built up on JCW's internet wrestling show SlamTV! at the Hog Rock Campgrounds in Cave-In-Rock, Illinois. This show featured several notable wrestlers like Ultimo Dragon, Scott D'Amore, Abdullah The Butcher, Jake Roberts, Tracy Smothers, Brutus Beefcake, Akira Raijin, and Scott Hall. The show was later released on DVD on October 30, 2007 as part of SlamTV! Part 2 (featuring episodes 10-15 including East Side Wars and Bloodymania); it featured the second half of the first season of SlamTV!.

On August 14, 2011, Bloodymania 5 became the first Bloodymania to be aired live on internet pay-per-view at the Hog Rock Campground in Cave-In-Rock, Illinois. The show was headlined by Vampiro defending the JCW Heavyweight Championship against Mad Man Pondo.

On August 14, 2011, Bloodymania 5 became the first Bloodymania to be aired live on internet pay-per-view at the Hog Rock Campground in Cave-In-Rock, Illinois. The show was headlined by Vampiro defending the JCW Heavyweight Championship against Mad Man Pondo.

On March 17, 2024, JCW announced the first tapings for their new show titled JCW Lunacy would take place on May 3, 2024 at the Newport Music Hall in Columbus, Ohio. Titled The Juggalos Strike Back, the show featured various talent from the independent circuit, JCW's regular roster, All Elite Wrestling (AEW) talent, and talent from the National Wrestling Alliance (NWA). In addition to the premiere taping, JCW announced on May 20, 2024 that they would hold an additional taping at the Harpos Concert Theatre in Detroit, Michigan and would feature Matt Cardona and the debut of the Nu Backseat Boyz consisting of Tommy Grayson and JP Grayson with their manager Johnny Kashmere. On June 10, 2024, Juggalo Championship Wrestling announced that they would launch JCW Lunacy as a bi-weekly show and would feature talent from the National Wrestling Alliance (NWA), Major League Wrestling (MLW), Total Nonstop Action Wrestling (TNA), All Elite Wrestling (AEW), Lucha Libre AAA Worldwide (AAA), Big Japan Pro Wrestling (BJW), and the independent circuit alongside JCW's regular talent. However, the show's format would abruptly switch to a weekly format beginning on September 4, 2024. On July 10, 2024, Psychopathic Records announced that Bloodymania 17 would be taking place during the Gathering of the Juggalos on August 16, 2024.

=== Storylines ===
Bloodymania 17 featured professional wrestling matches that involves different wrestlers from pre-existing scripted feuds and storylines. Wrestlers portrayed villains, heroes, or less distinguishable characters in scripted events that built tension and culminated in a wrestling match or series of matches. Storylines were produced on Juggalo Championship Wrestling's various events and on their weekly show, JCW Lunacy.

== Results ==
No.	Results	Stipulations
1	Slinky won a battle royal	Battle royal
2	Caleb Konley (c) defeated Simon Gotch by pinfall	Singles match for the JCW American Championship
3	George South and The Green Phantom defeated Breyer Wellington and Jeeves by pinfall	Tag team match
4	Painful Paul defeated Kongo Kong by pinfall	Singles match
5	Jenny Savage defeated Kallen Babyy by pinfall	Singles match
6	2 Tuff Tony, Crazzy Steve, and the Brothers of Funstruction (Ruffo The Clown and Yabo The Clown) defeated The Southern Six (Alex Taylor, James Storm, Kerry Morton, and Silas Mason) by pinfall	Eight-man tag team street fight
7	The Backseat Boyz (JP Grayson and Tommy Grayson) (with Johnny Kashmere) (c) defeated Deputy Dickhead and Officer Colt Cabana by pinfall	Tag team match for the JCW Tag Team Championship
8	Mosh Pit Mike defeated Super Beast and Tarzan Duran by pinfall	Three-way match
9	Matt Cross defeated Willie Mack (c) by pinfall	Singles match for the JCW Heavyweight Championship
10	Mad Man Pondo defeated JJ Allin and Nick Gage by pinfall	Three-way death match
(c) / – the champion(s) heading into the match
