= Bloodymania =

Juggalo Championship Wrestling event series

- Created by: Juggalo Championship Wrestling
- Promotions: Juggalo Championship Wrestling (2007-2018, 2021-present); Game Changer Wrestling (2025)
- First event: 2007

Bloodymania is a professional wrestling event, produced annually in August by Juggalo Championship Wrestling (JCW). All events are held at midnight during the four-day musical event Gathering of the Juggalos. The company regards it as the flagship event of JCW, as it is the biggest event that they hold in the year. The event was first produced in 2007; as of 2013, six more editions have since been held consecutively.

JCW's internet wrestling show SlamTV! is tailored to reach its climax at Bloodymania, which features matches for the company's championship titles, as well as specialty and gimmick matches. Since its inception in 2007 until 2013, events have been held at Hogrock Campgrounds in Cave-In-Rock, Illinois and from 2014 to 2025, events were held at Legend Valley in Thornville, Ohio.

Bloodymania events, like other professional wrestling shows, feature matches that are prearranged by the promotion's writing staff. These matches are non-competitive performances that combine elements of catch wrestling, mock combat, and theatre. Leading up to the event, wrestlers are portrayed as either villains or heroes in the scripted events that build tension and culminate in a wrestling match at the event.

== History ==
Bloodymania was the first major event held by Juggalo Championship Wrestling after its name change, from Juggalo Championshit Wrestling, on July 16, 2007. Each event consists of a main event and an undercard that feature championship matches and other various matches. The first event was held on August 12, 2007. There have been a total of seven events under the chronology to take place as of October 2026. The 2007 edition was the first, and currently only, event to be released on DVD. Bloodymania III received promotion by Pro Wrestling Torch writer Derek Burgan, with several interviews from key figures within the promotion and wrestlers on the card. In addition to the company's roster, Bloodymania events have featured such wrestlers as Roddy Piper, Último Dragón, Abdullah The Butcher, Dan Severn and Ken Shamrock.

== Events ==
Event	Date	City	Venue	Main Event
Bloodymania	August 12, 2007	Cave-In-Rock, Illinois	Hogrock Campgrounds	Insane Clown Posse and Sabu vs. Trent Acid and the Young Alter Boys; Corporal Robinson (c) vs. Scott Hall for the JCW Heavyweight Championship
Bloodymania II	August 10, 2008	Cave-In-Rock, Illinois	Hogrock Campgrounds	Corporal Robinson (c) vs. Raven in a "Loser leaves JCW" Ladder match for the JCW Heavyweight Championship
Bloodymania III	August 9, 2009	Cave-In-Rock, Illinois	Hogrock Campgrounds	Juggalo World Order (Corporal Robinson, Scott Hall, Shaggy 2 Dope, Violent J, and Sid Vicious) vs. Trent Acid and the Alter Boys
Bloodymania IV	August 15, 2010	Cave-In-Rock, Illinois	Hogrock Campgrounds	Mike Knox vs. Corporal Robinson (c) vs. Raven in a Triple Threat match for the JCW Heavyweight Championship
Bloodymania 5	August 14, 2011	Cave-In-Rock, Illinois	Hogrock Campgrounds	Corporal Robinson (c) vs. Vampiro for the JCW Heavyweight Championship
Bloodymania 6	August 12, 2012	Cave-In-Rock, Illinois	Hogrock Campgrounds	2 Tuff Tony (c) vs. Kongo Kong for the JCW Heavyweight Championship
Bloodymania 7	August 11, 2013	Cave-In-Rock, Illinois	Hogrock Campgrounds	2 Tuff Tony and Vampiro vs. Kongo Kong and The Boogeyman
Bloodymania 8	July 26, 2014	Thornville, Ohio	Legend Valley	2 Tuff Tony (c) vs. Tommy Dreamer for the JCW Heavyweight Championship
Bloodymania 9	July 26, 2015	Thornville, Ohio	Legend Valley	The Weedman (c) vs. 2 Tuff Tony vs. Matt Hardy in a three-way match for the JCW Heavyweight Championship
Bloodymania 10	July 22, 2016	Thornville, Ohio	Legend Valley	Kongo Kong (c) vs. Jeff Hardy vs. Willie Mack in a triple threat match for the JCW Heavyweight Championship
Bloodymania 11	July 28, 2017	Oklahoma City, Oklahoma	Lost Lakes Amphitheater	Kongo Kong (c) vs. Hy Zaya vs. Shane Mercer in a three-way match for the JCW Heavyweight Championship
Bloodymania 12	July 20, 2018	Thornville, Ohio	Legend Valley	Kongo Kong (c) vs. Shane Mercer in an anything goes match for the JCW Heavyweight Championship
Bloodymania 14	August 6, 2021	Thornville, Ohio	Legend Valley	2 Tuff Tony (c) vs. Vampiro for the JCW Heavyweight Championship
Bloodymania 15	August 6, 2022	Thornville, Ohio	Legend Valley	Vampiro vs. Delirious vs. Joshua Bishop in a three way electrified cage match
Bloodymania 16	August 8, 2023	Thornville, Ohio	Legend Valley	Joshua Bishop vs. Joey Janela vs. Matthew Justice vs. Tom Lawlor in a four-way match for the vacant JCW Heavyweight Championship
Bloodymania 17	August 16, 2024	Thornville, Ohio	Legend Valley	Mad Man Pondo vs. JJ Allin vs. Nick Gage in a three-way match
Bloodymania 18 (Note: Also referred to as JCW vs. GCW: The 2 Day War)	August 14, 2025	Thornville, Ohio	Legend Valley	Brothers of Funstruction (Ruffo The Clown and Yabo The Clown) (JCW) vs. YDNP (Alec Price and Jordan Oliver) (GCW) for the JCW Tag Team Championship and GCW Tag Team Championship
Bloodymania 18	August 15, 2025	Thornville, Ohio	Legend Valley	Matt Tremont (c) vs. 2 Tuff Tony in a barbed wire death match for the JCW Heavyweight Championship
Bloodymania 19	August 20, 2026	Macks Creek, Missouri	Mother Nature's Riverfront Retreat	Juggalo World Order (2 Tuff Tony, Willie Mack, Ruffo The Clown, EC3, and Jeeves) vs. Luciano Family (Sally Boy, and Vincenzo), Painful Paul, Krule, and Donovan Dijak in a GoreGames elimination match
(c) - refers to the champion prior to the match
