= JCW Battle Royal Championship =

Professional wrestling championship

Details
- Promotion: Juggalo Championship Wrestling
- Date established: February 14, 2025
- Current champion: Bulk Rogan
- Date won: September 24, 2025

Other names
- JCW Battle Trophy (2025); JCW Battle Royal Championship (2025–present)
Statistics
- First champion: Sonny Kiss
- Longest reign: Kerry Morton (336 days)
- Shortest reign: 1 day: Sonny Kiss; Luigi Primo
- Oldest champion: Ricky Morton (68 years, 168 days)
- Youngest champion: Kerry Morton (24 years, 167 days)
- Heaviest champion: Kongo Kong (375 lb (170 kg))
- Lightest champion: Luigi Primo (176 lb (80 kg))

The JCW Battle Royal Championship is a professional wrestling championship in Juggalo Championship Wrestling. It was established on February 14, 2025. The current champion is Bulk Rogan, who is in his first reign. He won the vacant title in a 20-person Country Time Rumble match at Lunacy: Carnival of Chaos on September 24, 2026.

== Reigns ==
As of October 31, 2026, there have been six reigns among six champions. Sonny Kiss was the inaugural champion. Kerry Morton has the longest reign at 336 days (officially recognized as 294 days). Kiss and Luigi Primo are tied for the shortest reign as both held the title for only one day, but Kiss's reign is officially recognized as the shortest at seven days. Ricky Morton is the oldest champion, who won the title at 68 years and 168 days old, while Kerry Morton is the youngest champion, who won the title at 24 years and 167 days old.

Bulk Rogan is the current champion in his first reign. He won the vacant title in a 20-person Country Time Rumble match at Lunacy: Carnival of Chaos on September 24, 2026, in Jeffersonville, Indiana.

Key
No.	Overall reign number
Reign	Reign number for the specific champion
Days	Number of days held
Days recog.	Number of days held recognized by the promotion

No.	Champion	Championship change			Reign statistics			Notes	Ref.
No.	Champion	Date	Event	Location	Reign	Days	Days recog.	Notes	Ref.
1	Sonny Kiss	February 14, 2025	Lunacy: Juggalo Weekend; Night 1	Worcester, MA	1	1	7	Won a 12-person battle royal by last eliminating Steven Flowe to become the inaugural winner of the JCW Battle Royal Trophy. Aired on tape delay on March 13, 2025.	
2	Mecha Wolf	February 15, 2025	Lunacy: Juggalo Weekend; Night 2	Worcester, MA	1	20	14	This was a 12-person battle royal. Aired on tape delay on March 20, 2025.	
—	Vacated	March 7, 2025	—	—	—	—	—	The title was vacated unannounced.	
3	Luigi Primo	March 7, 2025	Lunacy	Tucson, AZ	1	1	14	Primo won a 21-person battle royal to win the vacant title. Aired on tape delay on April 3, 2025.	
4	Ricky Morton	March 8, 2025	Lunacy	Albuquerque, NM	1	194	196	This was a 13-person battle royal. The trophy was replaced by the JCW Battle Royal Championship with a standard championship belt. Aired on tape delay on April 17, 2025.	
5	Kerry Morton	September 18, 2025	Lunacy: 2 Tuff Country	Jeffersonville, IN	1	336	294	This was an 18-person Country Battle Royale. Aired on tape delay on October 30, 2025.	
6	Kongo Kong	August 20, 2026	Lunacy: Gathering of the Juggalos	Macks Creek, MO	1	35	35	This was a 20-person battle royal.	
—	Vacated	September 24, 2026	—	—	—	—	—	The title was vacated unannounced.	
7	Bulk Rogan	September 24, 2026	Lunacy: Carnival of Chaos	Jeffersonville, IN	1	37+	37+	Rogan won a 20-person Country Time Rumble match to win the vacant title	

== See also ==
- JCW Heavyweight Championship
- JCW Tag Team Championship
