= Macks Creek (Little Niangua River tributary) =

Stream in the U.S. state of Missouri

Macks Creek is a stream in Dallas and Camden counties in the U.S. state of Missouri. It is a tributary of the Little Niangua River.

The stream headwaters arise in northern Dallas County at 37°53′39″N 92°58′51″W at an elevation of 1,090 feet (330 m). The stream flows north into Camden County through Black Hollow and turns west after crossing under U.S. Route 54 at the community of Macks Creek. The stream flows northwest and north to its confluence with the Little Niangua River at 38°00′57″N 93°00′48″W at an elevation of 725 feet (221 m).

The stream and community most likely was named after the local Mack or Hack family of early settlers in the area.
