= Clownvis Presley =

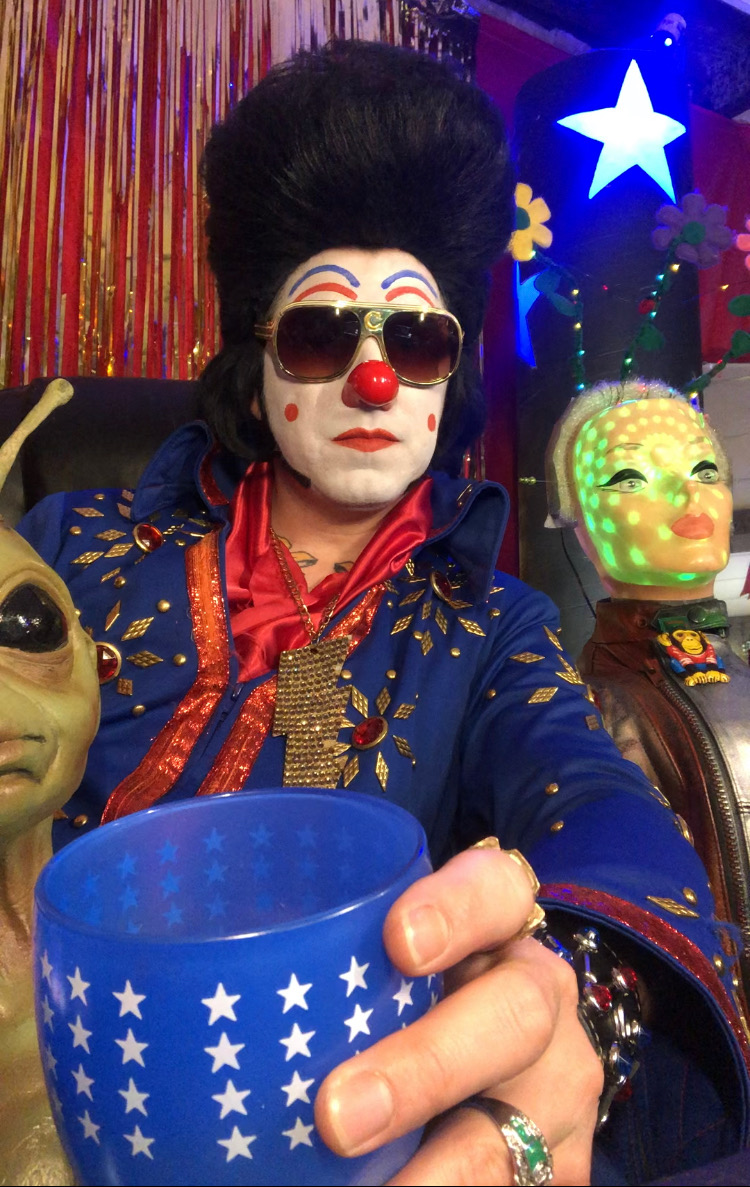
- Clownvis in his studio, May 2020

In-universe information
- Occupation: Standup comedian; musician
- Genres: Alternative comedy; popular music; magic; Elvis impersonator
- Website: www.clownvismafia.com

Clownvis Presley is a fictional character who combines musical parody and comedy, created and portrayed by Michael Leahy, and partly based on Elvis Presley.

== Early career ==
Leahy is the grandson of Earl Weaver. Donning a customized and bedazzled jumpsuit, oversized pompadour wig, full face makeup, and a bulbous red nose, Leahy began performing as Clownvis Presley for parties and special events in 2006. Hiring himself out as “a Craigslist Clown”, many of Clownvis’ earliest gigs came from postings in the online classified ads. He moved to Hollywood in 2010. After gaining attention from television appearances, he performed frequently at comedy clubs in Los Angeles and hosted “Clownvis and Friends” at the Hollywood Improv monthly from 2011–2013. LA Weekly called his act "better than the real Elvis".

Clownvis appeared on comedy bills with Tim Heidecker.

== Television, radio, and video appearances ==
Leahy appeared out of character on Judge Karen's Court, a BET television program, in 2010 as a plaintiff in a payment dispute over fees owed for Clownvis performances at several children's birthday parties. The defendant, agent Jason Thomas, refused to pay because of accusations of Clownvis being intoxicated during the parties. Judge Karen awarded Leahy $900.

On June 30, 2010, Clownvis appeared as a contestant on NBC's America's Got Talent in episode 10 of season 5, entitled "Final Auditions".

Clownvis was invited back on the season 5 finale episode which aired on September 15, 2010, singing "I Gotta Feeling" with nine other America's Got Talent Audition All-Stars. Rock group The Goo Goo Dolls sported Clownvis T-shirts on this episode.

== Clownvis to the Rescue ==
On March 16, 2020 at 9pm CDT, Clownvis began hosting a nightly Facebook livestream called Clownvis to the Rescue after his tour schedule was cancelled due to the global COVID-19 pandemic. The Riverfront Times says of the show, "He’s a hybrid comedian / entertainer / singer and watching him is like witnessing an OG Branson act on mushrooms." The characters on this show include an alien producer named Squeeb, a robotic dog named Robodawg, and a female robot named Brainina-95. The variety show is a mixture of comedy, music, and improv. Many of the shows have running themes from episode to episode, such as a battle with the Magician's Guild for giving away trade secrets, scuffles with banjo players for hogging the internet bandwidth, the studio being infiltrated by ill-intentioned “Blogans”, a mysterious relationship with the internet overlords, Spectrum, and the consumption of a variety of beverages with their own themed music, such as “Jamaican Red Wine”. One episode featured guest Violent J of Insane Clown Posse for a phone interview.

== Touring ==
Clownvis has toured with acts Insane Clown Posse, Neil Hamburger, Mac Sabbath, Unknown Hinson, The Blasters, and Supersuckers, amongst others. The first clown-themed tour he embarked on was the Clown Power tour with Mac Sabbath, in which he performed from Aug 28- Sep 14, 2016 throughout the midwest and eastern US.

Following The Gathering, Clownvis emceed ICP’s Hallowicked tour that fall. Clownvis also emcee’d and hosted the American Music 40th Anniversary Tour featuring The Blasters, Supersuckers, and Wayne Hancock from June 28-July 13, 2019. He was invited back to The Gathering in 2019 in Springfield, IN from July 31-August 3.

== Discography ==
- "Don't Be A Bitch (or You Won't Get Stuff for Christmas) b/w "Baby I'm Coming for You on Christmas” (Failure Records and Tapes, 2018)
