= Steven Flowe =

American professional wrestler

Personal information
- Born: Stephen Schmidt; August 27, 1990 (age 36) Midlothian, Illinois, U.S.

Professional wrestling career
- Ring names: Steven Flowe; Joey Dalton
- Debut: 2016

Stephen Schmidt, better known by his ring names Steven Flowe and Joey Dalton, (born August 27, 1990) is an American professional wrestler, He currently performs on the independent circuit – particularly with Juggalo Championship Wrestling (JCW), OnlyWrestlers, and the National Wrestling Alliance (NWA).

== Professional wrestling career ==
=== Independent circuit (2016–present) ===
On December 17, 2016, Joey Dalton made his professional wrestling debut during Pro Wrestling Blitz's King of Blitz event at the Blitz Arena in Joliet, Illinois when he competed in a battle royal with Chris Logan, Aiden O'Shea, Joe Alonzo, Ruff Crossing, and Chris Castro. In 2021, Dalton won the WPW Tag Team Championship with Joey Dalton under the tag team name of Deathwish, however, the team lost the title during Wisconsin Pro Wrestling's Reload event on May 13, 2022. In 2024, Dalton began performing in the SuperWrestlers promotion under the ring name Steven Flowe beginning with the promotion's Rising event in Chicago, Illinois. In December 2024, Flowe had gone viral after a series of clips were posted on social media after outlets like Vice and Loudwire had published articles talking about him. On May 2, 2025, Flowe made his National Wrestling Alliance (NWA) debut at NWA Chicago's Fred Kohler Invitational in which he fought against Eric Schultz.

On December 11, 2025, Flowe and Cocaine challenged the Brothers of Funstruction along with The Mutants (Lizard Man and Rafael Quintero) to a three-way match for the JCW Tag Team Championship at OnlyWrestlers' Frozen Fury event in Chicago, Illinois.

=== Juggalo Championship Wrestling (2025–present) ===
On February 14, 2025, Steven Flowe made his Juggalo Championship Wrestling (JCW) debut during the first night of the Juggalo Weekend event which aired on tape delay on February 27, 2025, as an episode of JCW Lunacy in which he fought against Mosh Pit Mike, Colby Corino, and Kongo Kong in a four-way match. On the same night, Flowe competed in a battle royal which featured Breyer Wellington and Sonny Kiss. On April 27, 2025, during the fourth night of the Hella Pain & Diamond Rain Tour, Flowe teamed up with Cocaine to form the Flowe Caine tag team in a tag team match against the Backseat Boyz. On August 1, 2025, Flowe and Cocaine teamed up with Magistrate Mike in a six-man tag team match against Alice Crowley, JP Grayson, and Shane Mercer during the Powder Keg pay-per-view at the Williams Center in Rutherford, New Jersey. On August 12, 2025, during the Gathering of the Juggalos, Steven Flowe and Cocaine fought against the St. Claire Monster Corporation consisting of Kongo Kong and Mr. Happy. During the 2 Day War pay-per-view on August 14–15, 2025 at Legend Valley in Thornville, Ohio, Flowe and Cocaine teamed up with Luigi Primo to fight against VNDL48 consisting of Atticus Cogar, Christian Napier, and Otis Cogar in a six-man tag team match. On September 18, 2025, during the 2 Tuff Country event, Flowe competed in a 2 Tuff Country Rumble match for the JCW Battle Royal Championship which was being defended by Ricky Morton and featured Kerry Morton, Ninja Mack, and Shane Mercer.

== Championships and accomplishments ==
- Wisconsin Pro Wrestling
  - WPW Tag Team Championship (with Quinn Whittock as Deathwish)
