= Kaiser, Missouri =

Unincorporated community in Missouri, U.S.

Coordinates: 38°08′01″N 92°35′24″W

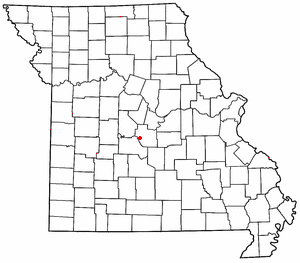

Kaiser is an unincorporated community in Miller County in the U.S. state of Missouri. It is located on a county road just south of Route 42/134. The zip code is 65047.

A post office called Kaiser has been in operation since 1904. The community was named after the local Kaiser family. With America's entry into World War I and the anti-German hysteria that followed, some residents proposed changing the name of the community to Success. However, after some debate, the plan failed.
