= Joey Gay =

American actor and comedian

Joey Gay is an American actor and comedian who competed in Last Comic Standing 4. He has had numerous appearances in Law & Order, and appeared on Live at Gotham.

Gay purchased Pips Comedy Club, regarded as one of the oldest comedy clubs in the United States, in 2004.
