= A Family Underground =

- Directed by: Paul Andresen
- Written by: Paul Andresen
- Produced by: Chris Kraft
- Cinematography: Paul Andresen
- Edited by: Pascal Leister
- Production company: Short Dog
- Distributed by: Psychopathic Video; RED Distribution
- Release date: May 12, 2009
- Running time: 90 minutes
- Country: United States
- Language: English

A Family Underground is a 2009 American documentary film written and directed by Paul Andresen. Filmed at the 2008 Gathering of the Juggalos, the film focus on the event and the Juggalo fan base. Gathering of the Juggalos is a music festival hosted by Psychopathic Records every summer. Their fan base, known as Juggalos, have become an underground musical subculture.

The film features concert performances and interviews about the event and fanbase by the entire Psychopathic Records roster and other artists which performed at the festival. Released direct-to-video in 2009, it is the second documentary produced by Psychopathic Records, after Shockumentary, released in 1998.

== Plot ==
The film loosely follows an English couple that travels to Cave-In-Rock, Illinois, United States to attend the ninth annual Gathering of the Juggalos. The 2008 event is the first Gathering that the couple has attended. While the couple explores the festival grounds, clips from the multiple events occurring are captured, including professional wrestling from Juggalo Championship Wrestling. Interviews about the fan base are conducted with artists Anybody Killa, Ice-T, Afroman, Boondox, Blaze Ya Dead Homie, Three 6 Mafia, Twiztid, and Insane Clown Posse. Concert footage of the interviewed artists as well as the supergroups Psychopathic Rydas and Dark Lotus is included. The film concludes with the English couple getting unofficially married by Insane Clown Posse member Violent J.

== Production ==
Psychopathic Records' first documentary, Shockumentary, focused solely on hip hop duo Insane Clown Posse. The focus of A Family Underground is directed toward "the true story of ICP", their Juggalo fan base. The documentary is intended be an in-depth look at the Juggalo musical subculture, and "tries to [visually] explain what Juggalos are." The film was shot at the 2008 Gathering of the Juggalos, with film crews exploring the festival grounds and capturing activities at the event. Live concert footage was also filmed, which included angles showing the Juggalo crowd.

== Release ==
A Family Underground was released on DVD on May 12, 2009. In 2010, the documentary was reissued as part of the "Nuclear Edition" of Insane Clown Posse's album Bang! Pow! Boom!.

== Reception ==
In June 2009, A Family Underground peaked at No. 10 on the Top Music Video Sales. Rapper Aesop Rock called it one of his favorite films of the year.
