= Macks Creek, Missouri =

- Census-designated place
- Macks Creek in October 2026

- Location of Macks Creek, Missouri

- Location within Missouri Location within the United States
- Coordinates: 37°57′56″N 92°58′18″W
- Country: United States
- State: Missouri
- County: Camden
- Township: Russell
- Incorporation: 1923
- Disincorporation: September 27, 2012

Area
  - Total: 1.93 sq mi (5.01 km^{2})
  - Land: 1.93 sq mi (5.00 km^{2})
  - Water: 0.0039 sq mi (0.01 km^{2})
- Elevation: 876 ft (267 m)

Population (2020)
  - Total: 365
  - Density: 189.1/sq mi (73.01/km^{2})
- Time zone: UTC-6 (Central (CST))
  - Summer (DST): UTC-5 (CDT)
- ZIP code: 65786
- Area code: 573
- FIPS code: 29-45218
- GNIS feature ID =: 2395798

Macks Creek is an unincorporated community and census-designated place in southwest Camden County, Missouri, United States. The population was 244 at the 2010 census.

== History ==
A post office called Macks Creek has been in operation since 1872. The community takes its name from a nearby creek of the same name, which most likely was named after the local Mack or Hack family.

In 1997, a state audit of Macks Creek's treasury uncovered major financial woes. Shortly afterward, virtually every town official resigned from office and the city itself declared bankruptcy.

On August 7, 2012, voters approved dissolving the town with 69% in favor of the motion (above the required amount of 60%). The disincorporation turned out to be a slow and challenging process.

=== Speed trap designation ===
For years, Macks Creek had one of the most infamous speed traps in the nation, with a strictly enforced 45 mph (72 km/h) speed limit along US 54, which had a 55 mph (89 km/h) speed limit on either side of town. In 1995, this practice ended when the state of Missouri passed a law prohibiting cities and towns from collecting more than 45% of their total revenue from speeding tickets. Macks Creek reportedly had been collecting approximately 85% of its revenue from speeding tickets. The police department later resigned as well as the mayor. In May 2022, Reason magazine reported that, "If a small town has a law named after it, it's probably not for a good reason. Such was the case with Macks Creek, an obnoxious speed trap that inspired the Missouri legislature to pass the Macks Creek Law in 1995. This bill capped the percentage of annual revenue that towns could generate from ticket fines at 45 percent."

== Geography ==
Macks Creek is located on Macks Creek and U.S. Route 54, twelve miles (19 km) west of Camdenton and twelve miles (19 km) east of Preston.

According to the United States Census Bureau, the city has a total area of 1.18 square miles (3.06 km^{2}), of which 1.17 square miles (3.03 km^{2}) is land and 0.01 square miles (0.03 km^{2}) is water.

== Demographics ==
Historical population
Census	Pop.	Note	%±
2020	365		—
U.S. Decennial Census

=== 2010 census ===
As of the census of 2010, there were 244 people, 102 households, and 63 families living in the city. The population density was 208.5 inhabitants per square mile (80.5/km^{2}). There were 132 housing units at an average density of 112.8 per square mile (43.6/km^{2}). The racial makeup of the city was 97.1% White, 0.4% from other races, and 2.5% from two or more races. Hispanic or Latino of any race were 2.5% of the population.

There were 102 households, of which 30.4% had children under the age of 18 living with them, 40.2% were married couples living together, 13.7% had a female householder with no husband present, 7.8% had a male householder with no wife present, and 38.2% were non-families. 32.4% of all households were made up of individuals, and 14.7% had someone living alone who was 65 years of age or older. The average household size was 2.39 and the average family size was 3.03.

The median age in the city was 37.5 years. 24.6% of residents were under the age of 18; 8.5% were between the ages of 18 and 24; 22.9% were from 25 to 44; 27.8% were from 45 to 64; and 16% were 65 years of age or older. The gender makeup of the city was 46.7% male and 53.3% female.

=== 2000 census ===
As of the census of 2000, there were 267 people, 109 households, and 68 families living in the city. The population density was 285.2 inhabitants per square mile (110.1/km^{2}). There were 129 housing units at an average density of 137.9 per square mile (53.2/km^{2}). The racial makeup of the city was 97.38% White, and 2.62% from two or more races. Hispanic or Latino of any race were 0.37% of the population.

There were 109 households, out of which 36.7% had children under the age of 18 living with them, 52.3% were married couples living together, 9.2% had a female householder with no husband present, and 36.7% were non-families. 33.9% of all households were made up of individuals, and 22.0% had someone living alone who was 65 years of age or older. The average household size was 2.45 and the average family size was 3.17.

In the city the population was spread out, with 31.8% under the age of 18, 7.9% from 18 to 24, 29.2% from 25 to 44, 16.9% from 45 to 64, and 14.2% who were 65 years of age or older. The median age was 31 years. For every 100 females there were 84.1 males. For every 100 females age 18 and over, there were 75.0 males.

The median income for a household in the city was $21,875, and the median income for a family was $24,643. Males had a median income of $25,893 versus $13,125 for females. The per capita income for the city was $9,053. About 13.6% of families and 22.3% of the population were below the poverty line, including 20.2% of those under the age of eighteen and 24.1% of those 65 or over.

== Education ==
Macks Creek R-V School District operates one elementary school and Macks Creek High School.

Macks Creek has a public library, a branch of the Camden County Library District.
