= SlamTV! =

- Also known as: Slam TV
- Created by: Insane Clown Posse; Juggalo Championship Wrestling
- Starring: JCW roster
- Opening theme: "Tear It Down" by Motown Rage
- Composers: Insane Clown Posse; Motown Rage
- Country of origin: United States
- Original language: English
- No. of seasons: 2
- No. of episodes: 21

Production
- Executive producer: Insane Clown Posse
- Editors: Akuma; Robert Gammons; Mike Fortunato
- Camera setup: Multi-camera setup
- Running time: approx. 40 minutes to 60 minutes

Original release
- Release: April 7, 2007 – 2008

SlamTV! was an internet wrestling show, broadcast by the Insane Clown Posse's wrestling promotion Juggalo Championship Wrestling. It features color commentary by "Handsome Harley 'Gweedo' Guestella" (Shaggy 2 Dope) and "Diamond Donovan '3D' Douglas" (Violent J), with "Luscious" Johnny Stark (Twiztid's Jamie Madrox) filling in whenever needed. Its initial run was 20 episodes, taped on a nationwide tour entitled "The Tempest Release Party". Until its creation, aside from three initial DVDs, the only way to view JCW was in person or home videos.

== Seasons ==
=== Season 1 ===
Vampiro was originally scheduled to be part of the tour, but was pulled out at the last minute due to SlamTV! being scheduled for a national release on DVD, which would have violated his WSX contract. Season 1 was filmed from February 25-March 20, 2007. A pair of "Free Pay-Per-Views" were held; the first, named West Side Wars, was held in Long Beach, California, and was broadcast on June 20, 2007, and the second, called East Side Wars, was held in Philadelphia and broadcast on July 28. It also hosted its premier wrestling event at ICP's annual "Gathering of the Juggalos" festival entitled Bloodymania.

Tracy Smothers debuted in JCW by cutting a series of promos in which he insulted the company, the owners (Insane Clown Posse), and the fans. Tracy ran wild on JCW, having matches which mostly ended with Tracy choking opponents out. In the sixth episode, during 2 Tuff Tony's match, Tracy attacked Tony and caused him to be (kayfabe) carried out on a stretcher. With Tony out of action, Tracy continued to terrorize the JCW roster. Just days before Tony's return on episode 8, Tracy Smothers was (kayfabe) arrested and dropped from the rest of the tour, leaving Tony with no way to seek revenge.

In the early episodes of SlamTV!, Zach Gowen expressed his (kayfabe) dislike of JCW. As he continued to wrestle, Gowen began to appreciate the fans as they appreciated him. By the twelfth episode, two fan favorites Zach Gowen and Human Tornado teamed up to form the "Pimp and Gimp Connection". The two new faces of JCW made a successful team, which earned them a spot in the 8 Team Tag-Team Elimination match for the JCW Tag Team Championship at Bloodymania.

Long-time JCW wrestlers Mad Man Pondo and Necro Butcher teamed up, and after several matches, the tag team proved a success. Animosity grew between the two, though, as miscommunication cost both members multiple matches. In a match which pitted Necro Butcher against Nosawa, Mad Man Pondo interfered to perform his finisher, but pushed Nosawa aside and intentionally hit Necro with the Stop Sign Smash. The following two weeks saw the duo break out into (kayfabe) fist fights, which led to a series of matches between the two. The team reunited however at East Side Wars, and in the following weeks the duo earned themselves a spot in the 8 Team Tag-Team Elimination Match for the JCW Tag Team Championship at Bloodymania.

Nicknamed "The Japanese Juggalo Sensation", Nosawa has always been a fan favorite. He started out his SlamTV! career with a five episode losing streak. Nosawa received a letter from his mentor The Great Muta in the sixth episode, which stated that Muta was coming to JCW to check up on his pupil. Wanting to impress his mentor, Nosawa stepped up his game, and began a winning streak. At East Side Wars, Muta arrived in JCW to team with his student and defeated the newly reunited Mad Man Pondo and Necro Butcher. The next week, Muta left. During his match that week, Nosawa was attacked by Justin Credible. A match was set for Bloodymania; Justin Credible and 2 Cold Scorpio against Nosawa and The Great Muta.

Debuting in the first episode, "Holy" Trent Acid soon emerged as a major heel. Winning by any means necessary, Acid quickly moved up in the ranks. By the fourth episode, he won a 10 Man Battle Royal to become the number one contender for the JCW Heavyweight Championship. On the seventh episode, Acid faced off against the champion, Corporal Robinson, with the title on the line. During the match, Acid (kayfabe) temporarily blinded Robinson with holy water, causing the referee to end the match. At West Side Wars, Trent Acid got a rematch, and after using the belt as a weapon, Acid became the new JCW Heavyweight Champion. At East Side Wars, Corporal Robinson received his rematch against Trent Acid in a Steel Cage Match. Robinson pinned Acid after a Diving leg drop through a table off the top of the cage to regain the JCW Heavyweight Championship.

SlamTV! Part 1 (featuring episodes 1–9 including West Side Wars) became available on DVD on September 18, 2007, and SlamTV! Part 2 (featuring episodes 10–15 including East Side Wars and Bloodymania) became available on October 30.

==== Post-season ====
On October 6, 2007, an unaired event entitled Evansville Invasion took place in Evansville, Indiana. The event marked the debut of the Juggalo World Order (JWO), consisting of Scott Hall, Violent J, and Corporal Robinson. On October 31, at Hallowicked After Party Detroit, an episode of SlamTV! was recorded. It was released in the post-season on November 17. At the beginning of the show, Shaggy 2 Dope was introduced as a member of the JWO. After the main event of the night, special guest referee Nosawa ripped off his referee shirt to reveal that he was the newest member of the JWO.

On December 21, Juggalo Championship Wrestling held an event called Big Ballas' X-Mas Party. The main event featured The JWO (Violent J, Nosawa, and Scott Hall) vs. The Thomaselli Brothers. This match marked Scott Hall's first wrestling appearance since no-showing the TNA PPV Turning Point and several WWC shows.

=== Season 2 ===
Season 2 was filmed on the "Slam TV Tour 2008" from April 23-April 27. During the tour, on April 25, Human Tornado tore his ACL and dislocated his kneecap. While Tornado was entering the ring by jumping over the rope, he landed incorrectly causing the injury. On May 17, 2008, Psychopathic Records hosted the event Hatchet Attacks. Along with performances by the entire label, JCW wrestling was also included.

The first episode of Season 2 aired on June 16, 2008. It was announced that due to Necro Butcher signing with Ring of Honor, making him unable to compete in JCW, he and Mad Man Pondo had been stripped of the JCW Tag Team Championship. Eight teams were introduced to participate in the "SlamTV! Tag Team Title Tournament." The final two teams would face each other at Bloodymania II. The Weedman and Billy Bong defeated The Bumpin Uglies, The Bloody Brothers (Ian and Lane Bloody) defeated The Ring Rydas, The Bashums defeated Leatherface and Jason, and Zach Gowen and Conrad "Lights Out" Kennedy defeated The Thomaselli Brothers (Vito and Brandon Thomaselli) all to advance to the semi-finals. The Weedman and Billy Bong defeated The Bashums, and The Bloody Brothers defeated Zach Gowen and Conrad Kennedy to advance to the finals at Bloodymania II.

When the new team of Zach Gowen and Conrad Kennedy was announced, Human Tornado was (kayfabe) disappointed that the "Pimp and Gimp Connection" weren't competing. In the second episode, Human Tornado saw heel manager Scott D'Amore leaving Conrad Kennedy's dressing room, and grew suspicious. After Gowen and Kennedy lost their match with The Bloody Brothers, Kennedy attacked Gowen. Human Tornado ran into the ring to save him, and Kennedy retreated to the stage, where Scott D'Amore met with him. Backstage, D'Amore proclaimed that he was going to create a stable, starting with the members Conrad Kennedy and Kowabata, which is going to reform JCW. A match was set for Bloodymania II; Pimp and Gimp Connection against Conrad Kennedy and a mystery partner.

One feud was carried on from the first season; that of 2 Tuff Tony and Tracy Smothers. In the first episode of season two, both men faced off in a match which saw Tracy win after a fast count by the referee, who was later revealed as (kayfabe) Tracy's illegitimate daughter, Isabella. In the third episode, Scott D'Amore served 2 Tuff Tony with a (kayfabe) restraining order from Tracy Smothers and his daughter. Backstage, Tracy caught Isabella listening to Boondox, the rapper who sings 2 Tuff Tony's entrance music. 2 Tuff Tony violated the restraining order in the fourth episode by attacking Tracy Smothers after his match. Once arriving backstage, Tracy Smothers assaulted Boondox after catching Isabella (kayfabe) engaging in sexual actions with him. In the final episode of the season, Tracy Smothers challenged Boondox to a tag team match at Bloodymania II; Tracy and Isabella against Boondox and anybody Boondox chooses. Boondox accepted Tracy's challenge, and named 2 Tuff Tony as his partner.

In the second episode, Corporal Robinson put his JCW Heavyweight Championship on the line against Sexy Slim Goody. When Robinson attempted to hit his finishing move, Boot Camp, the lights shut off. When they turned back on, Raven appeared in the ring and hit Robinson with his Evenflow DDT, before stealing the JCW Heavyweight Championship belt. In the third episode, Raven, along with Sexy Slim Goody, cut a promo in the ring before Corporal Robinson interrupted and demanded his title back. Sexy Slim Goody (kayfabe) knocked Robinson out with a steel chair shot. Raven pulled out hair clippers and began to shave Robinson's afro. Sabu appeared from out of the crowd and scared Raven off, leaving Robinson with a half shaved afro. The tag team of Raven and Sexy Slim Goody had a match against Corporal Robinson and Sabu in the following episode. Sabu, who had legitimately injured his hip recently, could only perform stomps, punches, and chair shots, but still managed to cause Raven to flee the match with the stolen JCW belt. The end of the final episode featured Raven and Corporal Robinson cutting promos about their match at Bloodymania II.

==== Post-season ====
On October 31, at the Hallowicked After Party in Detroit, the Juggalo World Order (Scott Hall, Shaggy 2 Dope, Violent J, and Corporal Robinson) interfered in the opening match, beating up both wrestlers as well as the referee. Violent J got on the microphone and called 2 Tuff Tony down to the ring. He then asked 2 Tuff Tony to join the JWO, before Tony responded by explaining that he was a one-man team. Mid sentence, Tony stopped and exclaimed, "Fuck That! I Wanna roll with the JWO!" Violent J then gave 2 Tuff Tony a Hallowicked version of the JWO jersey, before announcing him as an official member of the Juggalo World Order.

On November 9, the Juggalo World Order (Scott Hall, Shaggy 2 Dope, Violent J, 2 Tuff Tony, and Corporal Robinson) "invaded" Total Non-Stop Action's Turning Point PPV by seating themselves in the front row. The group also showed interest in "invading" WWE at its 2009 Royal Rumble PPV (which happened in their hometown Detroit, Michigan), but were unable due to filming commitments for Big Money Rustlas in Los Angeles. The group stated that they still want to "invade" the WWE, Ring Of Honor, and Ultimate Fighting Championship.

== 2007 End of the Year Awards ==
On December 21, 2007, "JCW 2007 Year End Awards" voting started on the official website. The winners were announced on the Jan. 10 edition of the internet radio show 'The Main Event' hosted by Violent J and Corporal Robinson.

Winners:

Best Tag Team of 2007:

1. Mad Man Pondo & Necro Butcher
2. Pimp & Gimp Connection (Human Tornado & Zach Gowen)

Best Face of 2007:

1. Scott Hall
2. 2 Tuff Tony

2007's Most Hated:

1. "Holy" Trent Acid
2. Mad Man Pondo

Best JCW Show of 2007:

1. Bloodymania
2. West Side Wars

Best Wrestler of 2007:

1. Corporal Robinson
2. 2 Tuff Tony

Best Feud of 2007:

1. "Southern" Tracy Smothers vs. anybody in JCW
2. "Holy" Trent Acid vs. Corporal Robinson
