= D-Ray 3000 =

American professional wrestler

Personal information
- Born: Dorian Hill; August 9, 1982 (age 43) Detroit, Michigan

Professional wrestling career
- Ring name(s): D-Ray 3000; Don Crisis; Rick Baker; Viko Batomango
- Billed height: 5 ft 11 in (1.80 m)
- Billed weight: 202 lb (92 kg)
- Trained by: Sika Anoa'i; Doug Chevalier; Tommy Johnson
- Debut: September 9, 2000

Dorian Hill (born August 9, 1982) is an American professional wrestler, better known under his ring name D-Ray 3000. He is best known for his stint in Total Nonstop Action Wrestling.

== Professional wrestling career ==
=== Early career ===
Hill began his training at the age of 16 under "The Canadian Destroyer" Doug Chevalier and "Primetime" Tommy Johnson. He made his professional debut on September 9, 2000, with the ring name Don Crisis. After wrestling his first year in Michigan, Hill headed off to Pensacola, Florida, where he received further training from Sika Anoa'i, one half of The Wild Samoans. While training with Sika, he began wrestling for his promotion XW-2000.

=== Total Nonstop Action Wrestling (2004–2005, 2006) ===
In 2003, Hill sent a tape to Total Nonstop Action Wrestling and was later given a tryout match with the company. According to Hill, after management said that he looked similar to André 3000, he and Christopher Daniels came up with the ring name D-Ray 3000. After signing with TNA, he debuted in 2004 and after was paired with Shark Boy, the team soon began to take on a comedic aspect, and periodically filmed humorous vignettes outside the Impact! Zone until D-Ray left TNA in the summer of 2005. D-Ray 3000 returned to TNA in October 2006 at TNA's flagship pay-per-view Bound for Glory, where he took part in the "Kevin Nash Open Invitational X Division Gauntlet Battle Royal" and even reunited briefly with Shark Boy. However, neither won the match.

=== Independent circuit ===
Hill changed his attire and wrestling style while retaining the D-Ray 3000 name and began making appearances in both the midwestern United States and Canada.

=== World Wrestling Entertainment (2007) ===
In March 2007 Hill made his World Wrestling Entertainment debut on an episode of SmackDown! as the "Ethiopian Heavyweight Champion" Viko Batomango, where he lost a match to Montel Vontavious Porter.

=== Smash (2011) ===
In January 2011 Hill wrestled for SMASH Pro Wrestling in Tokyo and Osaka, Japan.

=== Iron Monkey ===
After returning from Japan Hill lost his hair in a match in Toledo, OH and wrestled for a short time as Iron Monkey.

=== "The Righteous Maker" Rick Baker ===
Formerly, Hill took on a new name with a whole new look as "The Righteous Maker" Rick Baker. He would be found wrestling all over the mid-west. He was the IWN Lightweight Champion with the International Wrestling Network and was managed by Mike Flyte. The two were working around the United States during the summer of 2013. In November 2013, both Rick Baker and Mike Flyte made their debut at LCW in Lancaster, Pa. Their opponent was Ring of Honor's Jay Diesel. On October 10, 2014, Baker and Flyte faced Total Non Stop Action Superstar Shark Boy at Lancaster Championship Wrestling. When Flyte tried to interject, Baker slugged Flyte, which cost him the match.

== Personal life ==
Hill lists Keiji Mutoh, Randy Savage and Curt Hennig as his biggest influences.

== Championships and accomplishments ==
- Pro Wrestling Illustrated
  - PWI ranked him #260 of the 500 best singles wrestlers of the year in the PWI 500 in 2005
- Real Pro Wrestling Federation
  - RPWF Cruiserweight Championship (1 time)
- Thunder Zone Wrestling
  - TZW Heavyweight Championship (1 time)
  - TZW Cruiserweight Championship (1 time)
- World Xtreme Wrestling
  - WXW Cruiserweight Championship (1 time)
- XW-2000
  - XW-2000 Television Championship (1 time)
- Other titles
  - SAW Canada Cruiserweight Championship (Current)
  - HWF Cruiserweight Championship (1 time)
  - ICW Cruiserweight Championship (1 time)
