= Thornville, Ohio =

- Village
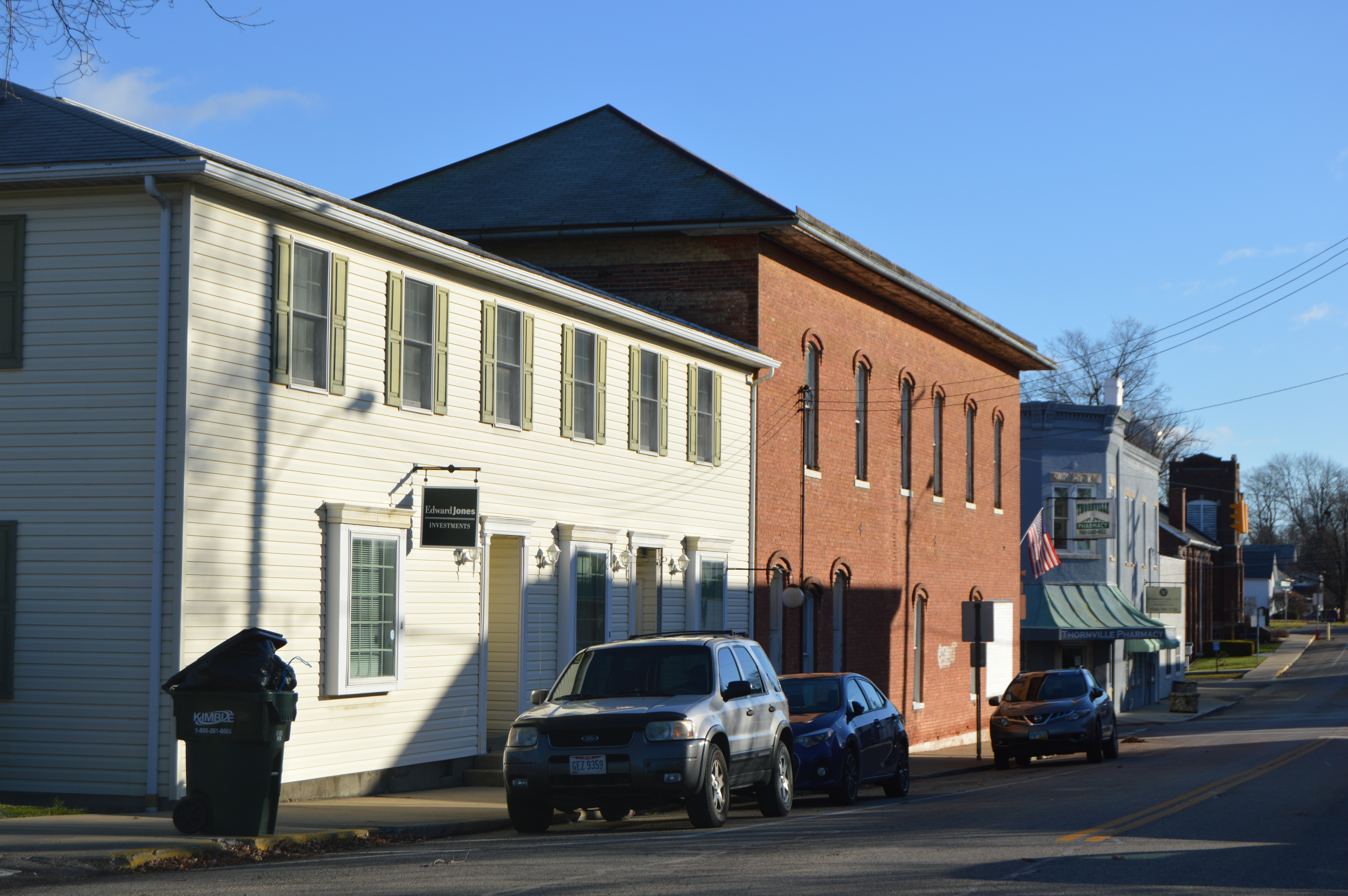
- Columbus Street downtown

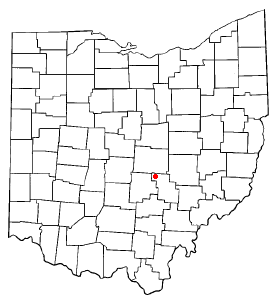
- Location of Thornville, Ohio

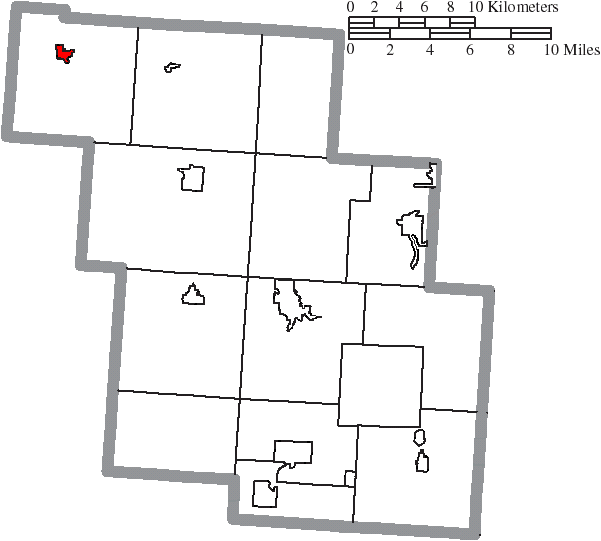
- Location of Thornville in Perry County
- Coordinates: 39°53′40″N 82°25′13″W
- Country: United States
- State: Ohio
- County: Perry

Area
  - Total: 0.53 sq mi (1.38 km^{2})
  - Land: 0.53 sq mi (1.38 km^{2})
  - Water: 0 sq mi (0.00 km^{2})
- Elevation: 1,024 ft (312 m)

Population (2020)
  - Total: 1,087
  - Density: 2,043.6/sq mi (789.03/km^{2})
- Time zone: UTC-5 (Eastern (EST))
  - Summer (DST): UTC-4 (EDT)
- ZIP code: 43076
- Area code: 740
- FIPS code: 39-76680
- GNIS feature ID: 2399976
- Website: https://thornville.gov/

Thornville is a village in Perry County, Ohio, United States. It is 20 miles (32 km) north of the county seat of New Lexington. The village had a population of 1,087 as of the 2020 census.

== History ==
Thornville was originally called Lebanon, and under the latter name was laid out around 1811. A post office called Thornville has been in operation since 1820.

Legend Valley in Thornville is the location of the Lost Lands music festival, hosted by Excision. Since 2021, it has hosted the annual Gathering of the Juggalos.

== Geography ==
According to the United States Census Bureau, the village has a total area of 1.10 square miles (2.85 km^{2}), all land.

== Demographics ==
Historical population
Census	Pop.	Note	%±
1880	269		—
1890	405		50.6%
1900	374		−7.7%
1910	411		9.9%
1920	451		9.7%
1930	439		−2.7%
1940	411		−6.4%
1950	432		5.1%
1960	521		20.6%
1970	679		30.3%
1980	838		23.4%
1990	758		−9.5%
2000	731		−3.6%
2010	991		35.6%
2020	1,087		9.7%
U.S. Decennial Census

=== 2020 census ===
As of the census of 2020, there were 1,087 people and 430 households living in the village. The population density was 988.2 inhabitants per square mile (381.5/km^{2}). There were 450 housing units at an average density of 409.1 per square mile (158.0/km^{2}). The census recorded 1,053 White residents, 2 African American residents, 1 Native American resident, 0 Asian residents, 3 residents of some other race, and 28 from two or more races.

=== 2010 census ===
As of the census of 2010, there were 991 people, 417 households, and 277 families living in the village. The population density was 900.9 inhabitants per square mile (347.8/km^{2}). There were 447 housing units at an average density of 406.4 per square mile (156.9/km^{2}). The racial makeup of the village was 98.8% White, 0.1% African American, 0.1% Native American, 0.1% Asian, and 0.9% from two or more races.

There were 417 households, of which 34.3% had children under the age of 18 living with them, 48.9% were married couples living together, 11.5% had a female householder with no husband present, 6.0% had a male householder with no wife present, and 33.6% were non-families. 27.8% of all households were made up of individuals, and 12.7% had someone living alone who was 65 years of age or older. The average household size was 2.38 and the average family size was 2.87.

The median age in the village was 39.7 years. 25.1% of residents were under the age of 18; 8.1% were between the ages of 18 and 24; 24.2% were from 25 to 44; 26.9% were from 45 to 64; and 16% were 65 years of age or older. The gender makeup of the village was 47.8% male and 52.2% female.

=== 2000 census ===
As of the census of 2000, there were 731 people, 282 households, and 212 families living in the village. The population density was 1,686.7 inhabitants per square mile (651.2/km^{2}). There were 298 housing units at an average density of 687.6 per square mile (265.5/km^{2}). The racial makeup of the village was 98.91% White, 0.41% Native American, and 0.68% from two or more races.

There were 282 households, out of which 35.1% had children under the age of 18 living with them, 66.0% were married couples living together, 6.4% had a female householder with no husband present, and 24.5% were non-families. 22.0% of all households were made up of individuals, and 10.3% had someone living alone who was 65 years of age or older. The average household size was 2.59 and the average family size was 3.03.

In the village, the population was spread out, with 26.0% under the age of 18, 6.3% from 18 to 24, 31.1% from 25 to 44, 23.3% from 45 to 64, and 13.4% who were 65 years of age or older. The median age was 38 years. For every 100 females there were 98.6 males. For every 100 females age 18 and over, there were 96.7 males.

The median income for a household in the village was $47,679, and the median income for a family was $51,641. Males had a median income of $34,107 versus $30,694 for females. The per capita income for the village was $18,922. About 1.8% of families and 4.2% of the population were below the poverty line, including 4.0% of those under age 18 and 6.8% of those age 65 or over.

== Education ==
Northern Local School District operates three public schools in or near the village: Thornville Elementary School, Sheridan Middle School, and Sheridan High School. Sheridan middle and high schools are within Thornville's zip code but are physically located about six miles southeast of the village along State Route 13, halfway between Thornville and Somerset.

Thornville has a public library, a branch of the Perry County District Library.
