= Legend Valley =

Outdoor music venue in Ohio, United States

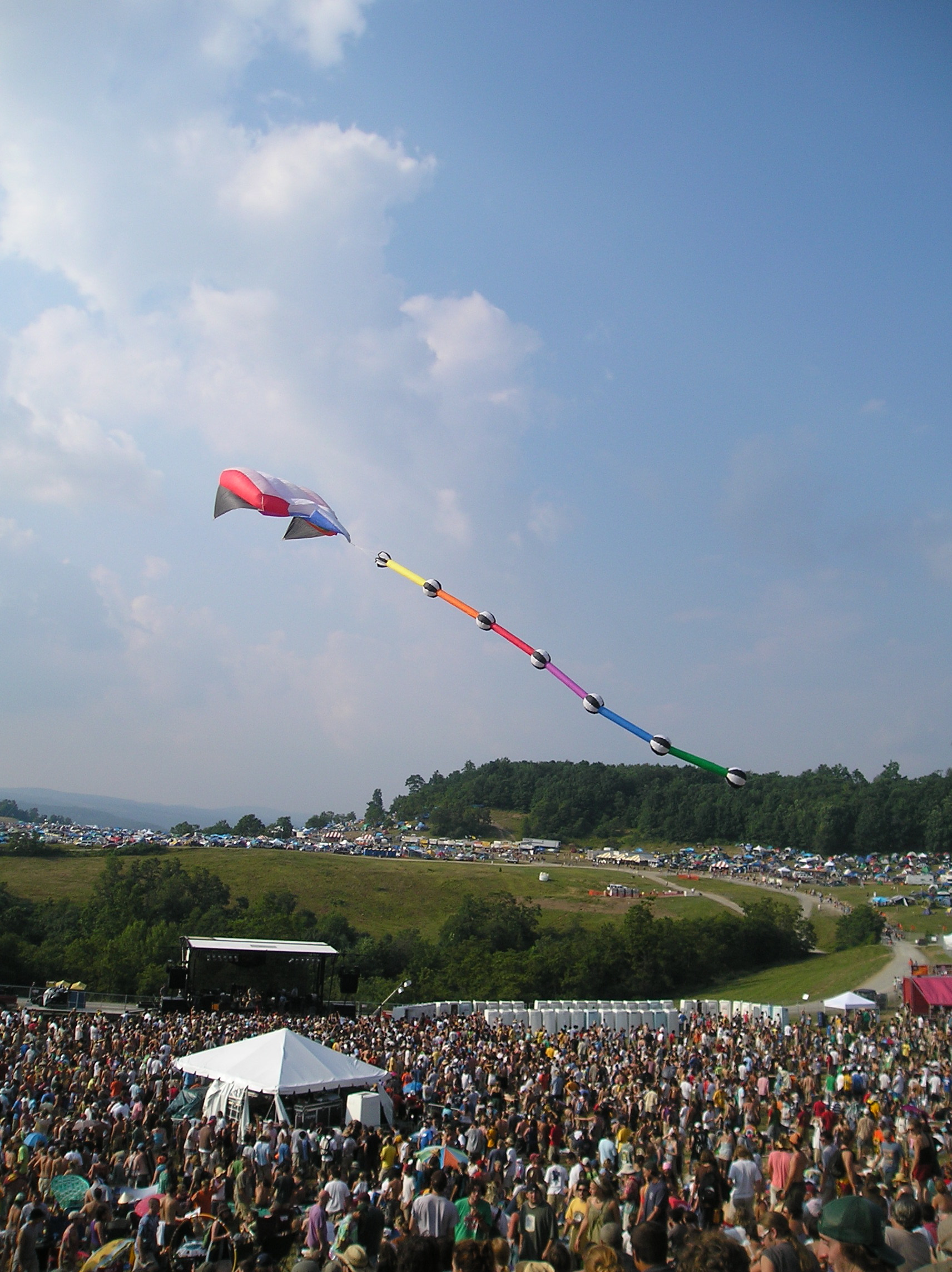
- A view of Legend Valley during the All Good Music Festival in July, 2012
- Interactive map of Legend Valley
- Former names: Buckeye Lake Music Center (1986–2003)
- Address: 7585 Kindle Rd 43076
- Location: Thornville, Ohio
- Coordinates: 39°56′16″N 88°24′24″W
- Owner: Steve Trickle
- Operator: Steve Trickle
- Seating type: lawn
- Capacity: 20,000–100,000
- Type: Amphitheatre; Campground

Construction
- Opened: 1978

Website
- www.legendvalleymusic.com

Legend Valley (formerly Buckeye Lake Music Center) is an outdoor concert venue and campground located in Thornville, Ohio. It has an estimated capacity of 55,000, across 230 acres.

The venue has hosted many music festivals and concerts since the 1970s. Since 2017, Legend Valley has been known as the venue for the annual Lost Lands dubstep and bass music festival. From 2014 to 2016 and from 2021 to 2025, Legend Valley was also the site for the annual Gathering of the Juggalos organized by Insane Clown Posse's Psychopathic Records.

== List of past events ==
The following is a list of past events at Legend Valley:

- The Dixie Jam – July 30, 1978, July 1, 1979, August 1, 1981, August 8, 1982, August 28, 1983, and July 6, 1985
- The Cars – July 15, 1979, with Cheap Trick, Eddie Money, Utopia and Roadmaster
- Ted Nugent – July 12, 1980, with Def Leppard and Scorpions
- Hank Williams, Jr. – July 25, 1982, with Alabama and Juice Newton; August 30, 1986, with Earl Thomas Conley and Sawyer Brown; and August 13, 1988, with Linda Ronstadt
- Journey – June 26, 1983, with Bryan Adams
- Foghat – June 27, 1983
- .38 Special – July 25, 1984, with Molly Hatchet and Night Ranger
- Scorpions – September 2, 1984, with Quiet Riot, Fastway and Kick Axe
- Bryan Adams – July 13, 1985, with Kim Mitchell and The Innocent
- The Beach Boys – July 27, 1985, with John Cafferty & The Beaver Brown Band
- ZZ Top – June 28, 1986, with Yngwie Malmsteen and The Call
- AC/DC – September 6, 1986, with Quiet Riot and Loudness
- Bon Jovi – May 24, 1987, with Cinderella and July 2, 1989, with Cinderella and Bullet Boys
- Mötley Crüe – July 26, 1987, with Whitesnake and Anthrax and July 4, 1990, with Tesla and Johnny Crash
- Lynyrd Skynyrd – June 12, 1988, with The Rossington Band and May 31, 1993
- The Grateful Dead – June 25, 1988, with Bruce Hornsby & The Range; June 9, 1991, with The Violent Femmes; July 1, 1992, with The Steve Miller Band; June 11, 1993, with Sting; and July 29, 1994, with Traffic
- Def Leppard – August 6, 1988, with Europe
- Aerosmith – August 28, 1988, with Guns N' Roses
- Poison – May 20, 1989, with Warrant and Tesla and May 31, 1993, with Lynyrd Skynyrd, Damn Yankees and FireHouse
- Alabama – June 25, 1989, with The Forester Sisters
- Metallica – August 12, 1989, with The Cult and June 28, 1992, with Metal Church
- Kathy Mattea – September 2, 1990, with Travis Tritt
- Bad Company – July 7, 1991, with The Damn Yankees
- Lollapalooza – July 8, 1993, and July 3, 1996
- Van Halen – August 2, 1993, with The Vince Neil Band
- Jimmy Buffett & The Coral Reefer Band – August 21, 1993, July 16, 1994, with Melissa Etheridge, August 5, 1995, and June 15, 1996
- The World of Music, Arts and Dance Festival – September 10, 1993
- Megadeth – August 9, 1997, with Life of Agony and Coal Chamber
- Alice Cooper – August 10, 1997, with Warrant, Dokken and Slaughter
- The Hookahville Festival – May 28–30, 1999, May 26–28, 2000, May 24–25, 2002, May 27, 2006, May 25–27, 2007, May 23–25, 2008, May 23–24, 2009, May 29–31, 2010, May 28–30 and September 2–4, 2011 and May 25–27, 2012
- Jefferson Starship – July 31, 1999
- The Yonder Mountain String Band – May 27, 2006
- The Guess Who – September 2, 2006
- The Dark Star Orchestra – August 31, 2007
- The Harvest Jam – September 1–3, 2007
- The Cabin Fever Jam – May 1–2, 2009
- The Woodshock Festival – August 14–15, 2010 and August 5–7, 2011
- The Kottonmouth Kings – September 4, 2010, and August 5, 2011
- The All Good Music Festival – July 19–22, 2012 and July 18–21, 2013
- The Dark Star Jubilee – August 31 – September 2, 2012, May 24–26, 2013 and May 23–26, 2014
- The Werk Out Music Festival – September 20–23, 2012, September 12–15, 2013 and August 7–9, 2014
- WCOL 92.3's Country Jam – June 16, 2013, and June 13–14, 2014
- Aaron Lewis – June 28, 2013, with Blackberry Smoke
- Furthur – July 20, 2013
- Gathering of the Juggalos – July 23–26, 2014, July 22-25, 2015, July 20-23 2016, July 18–21, 2018, August 19-21, 2021, August 3-6, 2022, July 5-8, 2023, August 14–17, 2024, August 13-16, 2025
- WCOL 92.3's Woodystock Festival – August 29–30, 2014
- Goose – October 15, 2020; June 18–19, 2021; and June 10–11, 2022
- Lost Lands (2017- ongoing) – September 29 – October 1, 2017 (first one)
- Everwild Music & Arts Festival - August 12-13, 2022; August 3-5, 2023; August 1-3, 2024; July 31-August 2, 2025; July 30 - August 1, 2026

== See also ==
- List of contemporary amphitheatres
