= Juggalo Weekend 2025 =

2025 music festival

- Promotional poster
- Date: February 14–15, 2025
- Venue: Worcester Palladium
- Locations: Worcester, Massachusetts, United States
- Previous event: 2024
- Next event: 2026
- Organizer: Psychopathic Records

Juggalo Weekend
- Promotion: Juggalo Championship Wrestling
- Date: February 14–15, 2025 (aired February 27, 2025, March 13, 2025, and March 20, 2025)
- City: Worcester, Massachusetts
- Venue: Worcester Palladium

Juggalo Championship Wrestling event chronology
← Previous; Big Ballas Holiday Party	Next → JCW vs. ALW Wicked Game

The 2025 Juggalo Weekend was a two-day music festival organized by Psychopathic Records, a record label owned by the horrorcore hip-hop duo, the Insane Clown Posse. The event took place from February 14, 2025 to February 15, 2025 at the Worcester Palladium in Worcester, Massachusetts. The event also featured professional wrestling from Juggalo Championship Wrestling (JCW) which aired on tape delay on February 27, 2025, March 13, 2025, and March 20, 2025 as episodes of JCW Lunacy on YouTube.

== Background ==
The festival began in 2012 as a way to celebrate what was dubbed "Juggalo Day" which was February 17th. The day, according to the Insane Clown Posse, was meant to celebrate the identity of the juggalos. Over the years, the festival would also have special sets from Insane Clown Posse that were meant to represent their different setlists from previous shows. During the 2013 Juggalo Day weekend, the Insane Clown Posse performed a special "Riddle Box Show" set which featured all of the tracks from the Riddle Box album. In 2014, the Insane Clown Posse performed a Great Milenko-themed set in Columbus, Ohio. In 2015, the Insane Clown Posse held a Take Me Home charity show during the Juggalo Day weekend at the Detroit Masonic Temple in Detroit.

2017 would see Juggalo Weekend make its debut in Florida at Jannus Live in St. Petersburg, Florida and in Canada at the Stampede Corral in Calgary, Alberta. In 2018, Juggalo Weekend made its debut on the West coast when the event took place at the Fremont Country Club in Las Vegas, Nevada. On December 15, 2024, Psychopathic Records announced that Juggalo Weekend 2025 would take place at the Worcester Palladium in Worcester, Massachusetts and would feature the return of the Dark Carnival Games Convention.

== Performers ==
The lineup for Juggalo Weekend 2025 included Psychopathic Records artist Ouija Macc, local rapper Tier Diez, Suburban Noize artist Whitney Peyton, Chapter 17 Records artist Darby O'Trill, and Never Satisified artist Lardi B. Both nights of the festival were headlined by the Insane Clown Posse.

Friday (February 14)	Saturday (February 15)
Kriz Kaliko; Lardi B; Darby O'Trill; Insane Clown Posse's Tunnel of Love show	Ouija Macc; Whitney Peyton; Tierre Diaz; Insane Clown Posse

== Professional wrestling production ==
=== Background ===
On March 17, 2024, JCW announced the first tapings for their new show titled JCW Lunacy would take place on May 3, 2024 at the Newport Music Hall in Columbus, Ohio. Titled The Juggalos Strike Back, the show would feature various talent from the independent circuit, JCW's regular roster, All Elite Wrestling (AEW) talent, and talent from the National Wrestling Alliance (NWA). In addition to the premiere taping, JCW announced on May 20, 2024 that they would hold an additional taping at the Harpos Concert Theatre in Detroit, Michigan and would feature Matt Cardona and the debut of the Nu Backseat Boyz consisting of Tommy Grayson and JP Grayson with their manager Johnny Kashmere. On June 10, 2024, Juggalo Championship Wrestling announced that they would launch JCW Lunacy as a bi-weekly show and would feature talent from the National Wrestling Alliance (NWA), Major League Wrestling (MLW), Total Nonstop Action Wrestling (TNA), All Elite Wrestling (AEW), Lucha Libre AAA Worldwide (AAA), Big Japan Pro Wrestling (BJW), and the independent circuit alongside JCW's regular talent. However, the show's format would abruptly switch to a weekly format beginning on September 4, 2024.

From October 23, 2024 to October 29, 2024, JCW was part of the Train of Terror Tour with the first night in Nashville seeing the debut of Pink Kane, a Kane parody played by Quinn Whittock who would later swap to Yellow Kane and later to CoKane.

On the final night of the Train of Terror Tour in Joliet, Illinois, the Backseat Boyz (Tommy Grayson and JP Grayson lost the JCW Tag Team Championship to Bang And Matthews (August Matthews and Davey Bang). On October 30, 2024, JCW returned to pay-per-view with the Devil's Night Creature Double Feature on Triller TV which featured TNA wrestler Nic Nemeth, MLW wrestler Matt Riddle, and many more. In the main event, Willie Mack won the JCW Heavyweight Championship for the second time by defeating Matt Cross and Mecha Wolf in a three-way elimination match. Also featured were the Insane Clown Posse as the "Bitchin Wild Bucks" in a post-show concert. On November 30, 2024, JCW held their second pay-per-view of 2024 titled Spanks Givin' in Wyandotte, Michigan which was advertised as being free to attend.

On December 21, 2024 during the Big Ballas Holiday Party event, 2 Tuff Tony won the JCW American Championship after defeating Caleb Konley.

=== Storylines ===
Juggalo Weekend featured professional wrestling matches that involves different wrestlers from pre-existing scripted feuds and storylines. Wrestlers portrayed villains, heroes, or less distinguishable characters in scripted events that built tension and culminated in a wrestling match or series of matches. Storylines were produced on Juggalo Championship Wrestling's various events and on their weekly show, JCW Lunacy.

=== Results ===
Other on-screen personnel
Role:	Name:
Commentators	Joe Dombrowski
Commentators	Mark Roberts
Commentators	Zac Amico
Commentators	Shaggy 2 Dope
Ring announcer	The Ringmaster

Night 1 - February 14, 2025
No.	Results	Stipulations
1	The Brothers of Funstruction (Ruffo The Clown and Yabo The Clown) defeated Sean Henderson and Vern Vicallo by pinfall	Tag team match
2	Breyer Wellington (with Jeeves) defeated Cocaine by pinfall	Singles match
3	Colby Corino defeated Kongo Kong, Mosh Pit Mike, and Steven Flowe by pinfall	Four-way match
4	Dani Mo (c) defeated Gabby Forza by pinfall	Singles match for the JCW Women's Championship
5	2 Tuff Tony and The Backseat Boyz (JP Grayson and Tommy Grayson) defeated Kerry Morton and The Batiri (Kodama and Obariyon) by pinfall	Six-man tag team match
6	The Wraith defeated Tarzan Duran by pinfall	Singles match
7	Facade defeated Mecha Wolf by pinfalll	Singles match
8	Caleb Konley and Painful Paul defeated Luigi Primo and Mickie Knuckles by pinfall	Tag team match
9	Sonny Kiss defeated Breyer Wellington, Erik Chacha, Foxx Vinyer, Jake Gray, Jeeves, Kodama, Nathan Davis, Obariyon, Smokey C, Steven Flowe, and Vern Vicallo by last eliminating Steven Flowe	Battle royal
10	Willie Mack (c) defeated The Misfit by DQ	Singles match for the JCW Heavyweight Championship
(c) / – the champion(s) heading into the match

Night 2 - February 15, 2025
No.	Results	Stipulations
1	The Brothers of Funstruction (Ruffo The Clown and Yabo The Clown) defeated The Batiri (Kodama and Obariyon) by pinfall	Tag team match
2	Mickie Knuckles defeated Gabby Forza by pinfall	Singles match
3	Painful Paul defeated Mike Be High, Kongo Kong, Steven Flowe, Tarzan Duran, and The Wraith by last eliminating The Wraith	Rumble riot match
4	Facade defeated Cocaine and Mecha Wolf by pinfall	Three-way match
5	2 Tuff Tony (c) defeated Kerry Morton by pinfall	Singles match for the JCW American Championship
6	Dani Mo (c) defeated Sonny Kiss by pinfall	Singles match for the JCW Women's Championship
7	Luigi Primo defeated Breyer Wellington by pinfalll	Singles match
8	Colby Corino and Shane Mercer defeated The Backseat Boyz (JP Grayson and Tommy Grayson) (c) by pinfall	Tag team match for the JCW Tag Team Championship
9	Mickie Knuckles defeated Caleb Konley by pinfall	Singles match
10	Mecha Wolf defeated Erik Chacha, Foxx Vinyer, Jake Gray, Jeeves, Kodama, Luigi Primo, Nathan Davis, Obariyon, Rain Conway, Ruffo The Clown, Sean Henderson, Smokey C, Sonny Kiss, Steven Flowe, Tarzan Duran, Vern Vicallo, and Yabo The Clown by last eliminating Sonny Kiss	Battle royal
11	Willie Mack (c) defeated Matt Cross	Street fight for the JCW Heavyweight Championship
(c) / – the champion(s) heading into the match
