= March of Madness Tour =

2024 American concert and wrestling tour

- Promotion: Juggalo Championship Wrestling
- Date: December 4–5, 2024
- City: Night 1: Little Rock, Arkansas; Night 2: St. Louis, Missouri
- Venue: Night 1: Little Rock Hall; Night 2: The Hawthorn

Juggalo Championship Wrestling event chronology
← Previous; JCW Spanks Givin'	Next → Deck The Jaws

The March of Madness Tour was a professional wrestling and concert tour produced by Juggalo Championship Wrestling. The tour took place on December 4, 2024 at the Little Rock Hall in Little Rock, Arkansas and on December 5, 2024 at the Hawthorn in St. Louis, Missouri. Both nights were streamed live as episodes of JCW Lunacy on YouTube, Twitch, and Facebook. The tour also featured live performances from Ouija Macc.

== Production ==
=== Background ===
On March 17, 2024, JCW announced the first tapings for their new show titled JCW Lunacy would take place on May 3, 2024 at the Newport Music Hall in Columbus, Ohio. Titled The Juggalos Strike Back, the show would feature various talent from the independent circuit, JCW's regular roster, All Elite Wrestling (AEW) talent, and talent from the National Wrestling Alliance (NWA). In addition to the premiere taping, JCW announced on May 20, 2024 that they would hold an additional taping at the Harpos Concert Theatre in Detroit, Michigan and would feature Matt Cardona and the debut of the Nu Backseat Boyz consisting of Tommy Grayson and JP Grayson with their manager Johnny Kashmere. On June 10, 2024, Juggalo Championship Wrestling announced that they would launch JCW Lunacy as a bi-weekly show and would feature talent from the National Wrestling Alliance (NWA), Major League Wrestling (MLW), Total Nonstop Action Wrestling (TNA), All Elite Wrestling (AEW), Lucha Libre AAA Worldwide (AAA), Big Japan Pro Wrestling (BJW), and the independent circuit alongside JCW's regular talent. However, the show's format would abruptly switch to a weekly format beginning on September 4, 2024.

In August 2024, Insane Clown Posse announced that they would be going on an eight-day tour titled the Train of Terror Tour which would build up to their annual Hallowicked concert in Detroit, Michigan.

On September 16, 2024, JCW announced their first pay-per-view event since 2013 titled the Devil's Night Creature Double Feature which would take place at the Majestic Theatre in Detroit, Michigan and would feature the Insane Clown Posse as the "Bitchin' Wild Bucks". On September 18, 2024, JCW announced that they would be part of a Train of Terror Tour which would consist of the Insane Clown Posse themselves, Wakko The Kidd, Monster Wolf, Ouija Macc, and Shaggy The Airhead and would lead up to the Insane Clown Posse's annual Halloween night event, Hallowicked at the Detroit Masonic Temple in Detroit, Michigan. On the October 16, 2024 episode of JCW Lunacy, the promotion would showcase two matches from the 2024 Gathering of the Juggalos at Legend Valley in Thornville, Ohio. The first one being a battle royal with the winner being crowned the inaugural JCW American Championship which Caleb Konley had won and the main event of Bloodymania 17 which consisted of Willie Mack defending the JCW Heavyweight Championship against Matt Cross. The first night of the Train of Terror Tour which was streamed live on October 23, 2024 would see the debut of Pink Kane, a Kane parody played by Quinn Whittock who would later swap to Yellow Kane and later CoKane. On the final night of the Train of Terror Tour in Joliet, Illinois, the Backseat Boyz (Tommy Grayson and JP Grayson lost the JCW Tag Team Championship to Bang And Matthews (August Matthews and Davey Bang). During the Devil's Night pay-per-view, the first JCW Women's Champion was crowned when Dani Mo won a battle royal. The JCW Tag Team Championship and the JCW Heavyweight Championship also changed hands as the Backseat Boyz (Tommy Grayson and JP Grayson) won the tag team titles back from Bang And Matthews (August Matthews and Davey Bang) and Willie Mack who won the JCW Heavyweight Championship back from Matt Cross in a three way elimination match which featured Mecha Wolf. On November 30, 2024, JCW held the Spanks Givin' pay-per-view in Wyandotte, Michigan which was free to attend.

=== Storylines ===
The March of Madness Tour featured professional wrestling matches that involves different wrestlers from pre-existing scripted feuds and storylines. Wrestlers portrayed villains, heroes, or less distinguishable characters in scripted events that built tension and culminated in a wrestling match or series of matches. Storylines were produced on Juggalo Championship Wrestling's various events and their weekly streaming program JCW Lunacy.

== Results ==
Other on-screen personnel
Role:	Name:
Commentators	Mark Roberts
Commentators	Zac Amico
Ring announcer	The Ringmaster

Night 1 - December 4, 2024
No.	Results	Stipulations	Times
1	Colby Corino defeated Facade by pinfall	Singles match	9:08
2	The Brothers of Funstruction (Ruffo The Clown and Yabo The Clown) defeated K-Toomer and William Blackwell by pinfall	Tag team match	7:59
3	The Misfit defeated Tarzan Duran by pinfall	Singles match	4:05
4	2 Tuff Tony defeated Alex Taylor by pinfall	Singles match	8:50
5	The Backseat Boyz (JP Grayson and Tommy Grayson) (c) defeated The OMGs (Action Jackson and Mike Anthony) by pinfall	Tag team match for the JCW Tag Team Championship	7:02
6	Kerry Morton defeated Mickie Knuckles	Singles match	5:57
7	Kongo Kong vs. Matt Cross ended in a no contest	Singles match	8:19
8	Breyer Wellington, Caleb Konley, and Painful Paul (with Jeeves) defeated Lumber Pit Mike, CoKane, and Luigi Primo by pinfall	Six-man tag team match	10:26
9	Willie Mack (c) defeated Silas Mason by count out	Singles match for the JCW Heavyweight Championship	5:09
(c) / – the champion(s) heading into the match

Night 2 - December 5, 2024
No.	Results	Stipulations	Times
1	Colby Corino defeated Dan The Dad by pinfall	Singles match	8:58
2	The Misfit defeated Kody Lane and Mike Hunts Alligators by pinfall	Three-way match	4:25
3	Facade defeated Officer Colt Cabana by pinfall	Singles match	8:05
4	The Backseat Boyz (JP Grayson and Tommy Grayson) (c) defeated Breyer Wellington and Jeeves by pinfall	Tag team match for the JCW Tag Team Championship	8:00
5	Caleb Konley (c) vs. Tarzan Duran ended in a no contest	Singles match for the JCW American Championship	14:40
6	Painful Paul defeated Matt Cross by pinfall	Singles match	5:28
7	2 Tuff Tony, Mickie Knuckles, and Willie Mack defeated The Southern Six (Alex Taylor, Kerry Morton, and Silas Mason) by pinfall	Six-man tag team match	12:51
(c) / – the champion(s) heading into the match
