= JCW vs. ALW Wicked Game =

2025 Juggalo Championship Wrestling and Atomic Legacy Wrestling event

- Promotional poster
- Promotion(s): Juggalo Championship Wrestling; Atomic Legacy Wrestling
- Date: March 28, 2025
- City: Cocoa, Florida
- Venue: Space Coast Convention Center

Juggalo Championship Wrestling event chronology
← Previous; Juggalo Weekend	Next → Hella Pain & Diamond Rain Tour

JCW vs. ALW Wicked Game was a professional wrestling event produced by Juggalo Championship Wrestling (JCW) and Atomic Legacy Wrestling (ALW). The event took place on March 28, 2025 at the Space Coast Convention Center in Cocoa, Florida.

== Production ==
=== Background ===
On March 17, 2024, JCW announced the first tapings for their new show titled JCW Lunacy would take place on May 3, 2024 at the Newport Music Hall in Columbus, Ohio. Titled The Juggalos Strike Back, the show would feature various talent from the independent circuit, JCW's regular roster, All Elite Wrestling (AEW) talent, and talent from the National Wrestling Alliance (NWA). In addition to the premiere taping, JCW announced on May 20, 2024 that they would hold an additional taping at the Harpos Concert Theatre in Detroit, Michigan and would feature Matt Cardona and the debut of the Nu Backseat Boyz consisting of Tommy Grayson and JP Grayson with their manager Johnny Kashmere. On June 10, 2024, Juggalo Championship Wrestling announced that they would launch JCW Lunacy as a bi-weekly show and would feature talent from the National Wrestling Alliance (NWA), Major League Wrestling (MLW), Total Nonstop Action Wrestling (TNA), All Elite Wrestling (AEW), Lucha Libre AAA Worldwide (AAA), Big Japan Pro Wrestling (BJW), and the independent circuit alongside JCW's regular talent. However, the show's format would abruptly switch to a weekly format beginning on September 4, 2024.

From October 23, 2024 to October 29, 2024, JCW was part of the Train of Terror Tour with the first night in Nashville seeing the debut of Pink Kane, a Kane parody played by Quinn Whittock who would later swap to Yellow Kane and later to CoKane.

On the final night of the Train of Terror Tour in Joliet, Illinois, the Backseat Boyz (Tommy Grayson and JP Grayson lost the JCW Tag Team Championship to Bang And Matthews (August Matthews and Davey Bang). On October 30, 2024, JCW returned to pay-per-view with the Devil's Night Creature Double Feature on Triller TV which featured TNA wrestler Nic Nemeth, MLW wrestler Matt Riddle, and many more. In the main event, Willie Mack won the JCW Heavyweight Championship for the second time by defeating Matt Cross and Mecha Wolf in a three-way elimination match. Also featured were the Insane Clown Posse as the "Bitchin Wild Bucks" in a post-show concert. On November 30, 2024, JCW held their second pay-per-view of 2024 titled Spanks Givin' in Wyandotte, Michigan which was advertised as being free to attend. On December 21, 2024 during the Big Ballas Holiday Party event, 2 Tuff Tony won the JCW American Championship after defeating Caleb Konley. On February 15, 2025 during Juggalo Weekend, Colby Corino and Shane Mercer won the JCW Tag Team Championship for the first time after defeating the The Backseat Boyz consisting of JP Grayson and Tommy Grayson. However, Corino and Mercer were stripped of the belts the following month and a tournament was held to crown the new champions throughout March 6, 2025 to March 8, 2025.

=== Storylines ===
JCW vs. ALW Wicked Game featured professional wrestling matches that involves different wrestlers from pre-existing scripted feuds and storylines. Wrestlers portrayed villains, heroes, or less distinguishable characters in scripted events that built tension and culminated in a wrestling match or series of matches. Storylines were produced on Juggalo Championship Wrestling's various events and on their weekly show, JCW Lunacy and on Atomic Legacy Wrestling's various events.

== Results ==
No.	Results	Stipulations
1	Mickie Knuckles defeated Raging Dead by pinfall	Singles match
2	El Ridiculoso defeated Luigi Primo by pinfall	Singles match
3	Leva Bates defeated Kaci Lennox (with David Millan) by DQ	Singles match
4	Babathunder defeated M'Badu by pinfall	Singles match
5	Ink Inc. (Jesse Neal and Shannon Moore) defeated The Backseat Boyz (JP Grayson and Tommy Grayson) (with Violent J) by pinfall	Tag team match for the vacant ALW Tag Team Championship
6	Axx Clover defeated Jamie Stanley by DQ	Singles match
7	Caleb Konley defeated Mike Mondo by pinfalll	Singles match
8	Marquise Mills (c) defeated Simon Gotch by pinfall	Singles match for the ALW Next Level Championship
9	Willie Mack (with Violent J) (c) defeated Oddyssey by pinfall	Singles match for the JCW Heavyweight Championship
10	Jason Dugan and Renee Michelle (with David Millan) defeated Aleah James and Ryzin	Tag team match
(c) / – the champion(s) heading into the match
