= JCW Deck The Jaws =

2024 Juggalo Championship Wrestling event

Deck The Jaws
- Promotional poster
- Promotion: Juggalo Championship Wrestling
- Date: December 19, 2024
- City: Detroit, Michigan
- Venue: Majestic Theatre

Juggalo Championship Wrestling event chronology
← Previous; March of Madness Tour	Next → Big Ballas Holiday Party

Deck The Jaws was a professional wrestling pay-per-view event produced by Juggalo Championship Wrestling (JCW). The event took place on December 19, 2024 at the Majestic Theatre in Detroit, Michigan and was streamed live on Triller TV. The event also featured a live performance from Vinnie Dombroski, the lead singer of the rock band Sponge.

== Production ==
=== Background ===
On March 17, 2024, JCW announced the first tapings for their new show titled JCW Lunacy would take place on May 3, 2024 at the Newport Music Hall in Columbus, Ohio. Titled The Juggalos Strike Back, the show would feature various talent from the independent circuit, JCW's regular roster, All Elite Wrestling (AEW) talent, and talent from the National Wrestling Alliance (NWA). In addition to the premiere taping, JCW announced on May 20, 2024 that they would hold an additional taping at the Harpos Concert Theatre in Detroit, Michigan and would feature Matt Cardona and the debut of the Nu Backseat Boyz consisting of Tommy Grayson and JP Grayson with their manager Johnny Kashmere. On June 10, 2024, Juggalo Championship Wrestling announced that they would launch JCW Lunacy as a bi-weekly show and would feature talent from the National Wrestling Alliance (NWA), Major League Wrestling (MLW), Total Nonstop Action Wrestling (TNA), All Elite Wrestling (AEW), Lucha Libre AAA Worldwide (AAA), Big Japan Pro Wrestling (BJW), and the independent circuit alongside JCW's regular talent. However, the show's format would abruptly switch to a weekly format beginning on September 4, 2024.

From October 23 to October 29, 2024, JCW was part of the Train of Terror Tour which featured the Insane Clown Posse, Shaggy The Airhead, Ouija Macc, Wakko The Kidd, and Monster Wolf in which on the first night saw the debut of Pink Kane, a Kane parody played by Quinn Whittock who would later swap to Yellow Kane and later CoKane.

On October 30, 2024, JCW returned to pay-per-view with the Devil's Night Creature Double Feature on Triller TV which featured TNA wrestler Nic Nemeth, MLW wrestler Matt Riddle, and many more. Also featured were the Insane Clown Posse as the "Bitchin Wild Bucks" in a post-show concert. On November 30, 2024, JCW held their second pay-per-view of 2024 titled Spanks Givin' in Wyandotte, Michigan which was advertised as being free to attend.

On December 17, 2024, JCW announced that they would be holding the Deck The Jaws pay-per-view as part of the 25th anniversary of the promotion. The event was also advertised as a charity event in which attendees would get in for free if they donated a toy, coat, or 10 canned food items for admission. The first matches were also announced to be Colby Corino fighting against Luigi Primo along with the Backseat Boyz (Tommy Grayson and JP Grayson defending the JCW Tag Team Championship in an open challenge.

=== Storylines ===
Deck The Jaws featured professional wrestling matches that involves different wrestlers from pre-existing scripted feuds and storylines. Wrestlers portrayed villains, heroes, or less distinguishable characters in scripted events that built tension and culminated in a wrestling match or series of matches. Storylines were produced on Juggalo Championship Wrestling's various events and their weekly streaming program JCW Lunacy.

== Matches ==
Other on-screen personnel
Role:	Name:
Commentators	Mark Roberts
Commentators	Zac Amico
Commentators	Manny Fresh
Ring announcer	The Ringmaster

No.	Results	Stipulations
1	Evil Uno defeated Facade by pinfall	Singles match
2	Mickie Knuckles defeated Rory Shield by pinfall	Singles match
3	The Brothers of Funstruction (Ruffo The Clown and Yabo The Clown) defeated Breyer Wellington and Jeeves by pinfall	Tag team match
4	Luigi Primo defeated Colby Corino by pinfall	Singles match
5	Dani Mo (c) defeated Rae Larson by pinfall	Singles match for the JCW Women's Championship
6	Caleb Konley (c) defeated CoKane and Tarzan Duran by pinfall	Three way match for the JCW American Championship
7	The Misfit defeated 2 Tuff Tony by pinfalll	Singles match
8	The Backseat Boyz (JP Grayson and Tommy Grayson) (c) defeated Hustle and the Muscle (Rohit Raju and Zeeko) by pinfall	Tag team match for the JCW Tag Team Championship
9	Willie Mack (c) defeated Kongo Kong by pinfall	Singles match for the JCW Heavyweight Championship
(c) / – the champion(s) heading into the match
