= Juggalo Weekend =

Annual music festival in North America

- Genre: Hip hop; rock; heavy metal; funk
- Dates: Varies annually
- Venue: The Fowling Warehouse (2012); St. Andrews Hall (2013, 2016); Newport Music Hall (2014); Detroit Masonic Temple (2015); Harpos Concert Theater (2016); Jannus Live (2017); Canadian Juggalo Weekend: Stampede Corral (2017); Fremont Country Club (2018); House of Blues New Orleans (2019); Pershing Square (2020); Psychopathic Records Headquarters (2021); Rialto Theatre (2022); Boeing Center at Tech Port (2024); Worcester Palladium (2025); Factory Town (2026)
- Locations: Detroit, Michigan (2012-2013, 2015-2016); Columbus, Ohio (2014); St. Petersburg, Florida (2017); Canadian Juggalo Weekend: Calgary, Alberta, Canada (2017); Las Vegas, Nevada (2018); New Orleans, Louisiana (2019); Los Angeles, California (2020); Farmington Hills, Michigan (2021); Tucson, Arizona (2022); San Antonio, Texas (2024); Worcester, Massachusetts (2025); Hialeah, Florida (2026)
- Years active: 2012–2022, 2024-present
- Founders: Jumpsteady, Insane Clown Posse

Juggalo Weekend, formerly known as Juggalo Day is a two-day music festival organized by Insane Clown Posse's Psychopathic Records.

== History ==
The festival began in 2012 as a way to celebrate what was dubbed "Juggalo Day" which was February 17th. The day, according to the Insane Clown Posse, was meant to celebrate the identity of the juggalos. Over the years, the festival would also have special sets from Insane Clown Posse that were meant to represent their different setlists from previous shows. During the 2013 Juggalo Day weekend, the Insane Clown Posse performed a special "Riddle Box Show" set which featured all of the tracks from the Riddle Box album. In 2014, the Insane Clown Posse performed a Great Milenko-themed set in Columbus, Ohio. In 2015, the Insane Clown Posse held a Take Me Home charity show during the Juggalo Day weekend at the Detroit Masonic Temple in Detroit.

2017 would see Juggalo Weekend make its debut in Florida at Jannus Live in St. Petersburg, Florida and in Canada at the Stampede Corral in Calgary, Alberta.

In 2018, Juggalo Weekend made its debut on the West coast when the event took place at the Fremont Country Club in Las Vegas, Nevada.

== Performers ==
Over the years, several notable artists have performed at Juggalo Weekend. Kottonmouth Kings, Twiztid, Project Born, Big Hoodoo, Powerman 5000, and many other performers would be featured over the years. During Canadian Juggalo Weekend, Ice-T would perform there.

== Events ==
Year	Dates	Venue	Location	Performers	Notes	Ref
2012	February 17	The Fowling Warehouse	Detroit, Michigan	Insane Clown Posse, Blaze Ya Dead Homie, Mike E. Clark, Big Hutch, Sugar Slam, Axe Murder Boyz, Juggalo Championship Wrestling		
2013	February 16-17	St. Andrews Hall	Detroit, Michigan	Insane Clown Posse, Project Born, Myzery, Juggalo Championship Wrestling		
2014	February 17	Newport Music Hall	Columbus, Ohio	Insane Clown Posse, CLAAS, Downtown Brown, Big Hoodoo,		
2015	February 20-21	Detroit Masonic Temple	Detroit, Michigan	Insane Clown Posse, Trick Trick, Mike E. Clark, Big Hoodoo, ABK, Axe Murder Boyz, DJ Clay, Juggalo Championship Wrestling		
2016	February 19-20	Harpos Concert Theatre; St. Andrews Hall	Detroit, Michigan	Insane Clown Posse, Lil Eazy-E, DJ Yella, ABK, Big Hoodoo, Lil Wyte, Mastamind, Esham, Mushroomhead, Young Wicked, King 810, Swag Toof, Molly Gruesome, Juggalo Championship Wrestling		
2017	February 17-18	Jannus Live	St. Petersburg, Florida	Insane Clown Posse, ABK, Lyte, Big Hoodoo, Blahzay Roze, Sewerside, Kottonmouth Kings, DJ Clay, Stitches, Juggalo Championship Wrestling		
2017	April 7-8	Stampede Corral	Calgary, Alberta, Canada	Insane Clown Posse, Psychward Kidz, Blahzay Roze, Lyte, 2 Live Crew, Doom Squad, Swollen Members, Alberta Murderaz, Saintanik, Merkules, Kungfu Vampire, Big Hoodoo, Ice-T, Juggalo Championship Wrestling		
2018	February 16-17	Fremont Country Club	Las Vegas, Nevada	Insane Clown Posse, Lyte, Big Hoodoo, Ouija Macc, The Flatlinerz, Green Jelly, Rittz, Kungfu Vampire, Juggalo Championship Wrestling		
2019	February 16-17	House of Blues New Orleans	New Orleans, Louisiana	Insane Clown Posse		
2020	February 21-22	Pershing Square	Los Angeles, California	Insane Clown Posse, Powerman 5000, Powerflo, Kottonmouth Kings		
2021	February 3-27	Psychopathic Records Headquarters	Farmington Hills, Michigan	Insane Clown Posse, Juggalo Championship Wrestling		
2022	February 18-19	Rialto Theatre	Tucson, Arizona	Insane Clown Posse, Ouija Macc, Sweet Mess, Drop D, Roadside Ghost		
2024	February 23-24	Boeing Center at Tech Port	San Antonio, Texas	Insane Clown Posse, Darby O' Trill, Wakko The Kidd, Acetone, Mr. Sadistic, Layzie Bone, Kottonmouth Kings, Krizz Kaliko, Shade, Forilla, Juggalo Championship Wrestling		
2025	February 14-15	Worcester Palladium	Worcester, Massachusetts	Insane Clown Posse, Darby O'Trill, Whitney Peyton, Krizz Kaliko, Tierre Diaz, Whitney Peyton, Ouija Macc, Juggalo Championship Wrestling		
2026	February 27-28	Factory Town	Hialeah, Florida	Insane Clown Posse, Alla Xul Elu, Ouija Macc, Ganksta NIP, Juggalo Championship Wrestling		
