= Juggalo Weekend 2026 =

2026 music festival

- Promotional poster
- Date: February 27–28, 2026
- Venue: Factory Town
- Locations: Hialeah, Florida, United States
- Previous event: 2025
- Organizer: Psychopathic Records

Juggalo Weekend
- Promotion: Juggalo Championship Wrestling
- Date: February 27–28, 2026
- City: Hialeah, Florida
- Venue: Factory Town

Juggalo Championship Wrestling event chronology
← Previous; Carnival of Chaos Tour	Next → March Massacre Tour

Juggalo Weekend chronology
← Previous; 2025	Next → —

The 2026 Juggalo Weekend was a two-day music festival organized by Psychopathic Records, a record label owned by the horrorcore hip-hop duo, the Insane Clown Posse. The event took place on February 27, 2026 to February 28, 2026 at Factory Town in Hialeah, Florida. The event also featured professional wrestling from Juggalo Championship Wrestling (JCW).

== Background ==
The festival began in 2012 as a way to celebrate what was dubbed "Juggalo Day" which was February 17th. The day, according to the Insane Clown Posse, was meant to celebrate the identity of the juggalos. Over the years, the festival would also have special sets from Insane Clown Posse that were meant to represent their different setlists from previous shows. During the 2013 Juggalo Day weekend, the Insane Clown Posse performed a special "Riddle Box Show" set which featured all of the tracks from the Riddle Box album. In 2014, the Insane Clown Posse performed a Great Milenko-themed set in Columbus, Ohio. In 2015, the Insane Clown Posse held a Take Me Home charity show during the Juggalo Day weekend at the Detroit Masonic Temple in Detroit.

2017 would see Juggalo Weekend make its debut in Florida at Jannus Live in St. Petersburg, Florida and in Canada at the Stampede Corral in Calgary, Alberta. In 2018, Juggalo Weekend made its debut on the West coast when the event took place at the Fremont Country Club in Las Vegas, Nevada.

On January 30, 2026, Psychopathic Records announced that the 2026 Juggalo Weekend would take place at Factory Town in Hialeah, Florida.

== Performers ==
The lineup for Juggalo Weekend 2025 included Psychopathic Records artist Ouija Macc, South Park Coalition member Ganksta NIP, comedy rock band Green Jelly, Klokwerk E, Alla Xul Elu, Leathal Wreckords-signed rap group Fury, Strange Music-signed rap group ¡Mayday!, and Hush Gang Entertainment artist Sammy Sosa. Both nights of the festival were headlined by the Insane Clown Posse.

Friday (February 27)	Saturday (February 28)
Ganksta NIP; Alla Xul Elu; Klokwerk E; Fury; Insane Clown Posse's Carnival of Carnage show	Ouija Macc; ¡Mayday!; Green Jelly; Sammy Sosa; Insane Clown Posse's Straight Juggalo Jams show

== Professional wrestling production ==
=== Background ===
Since 2024, Juggalo Championship Wrestling has held numerous shows as tapings of its weekly streaming television program JCW Lunacy on YouTube and Facebook. On February 14 and 15, 2025, four episodes of JCW Lunacy were taped during the 2025 Juggalo Weekend in Worcester, Massachusetts.

On the November 6, 2025 episode of Lunacy which was taped on October 20, 2025, Big Vito would make his JCW debut when he was revealed as the enforcer of a "mystery investor". Vito would continue to make appearances and butt heads with Violent J until the debut of the "mystery investor". On October 26, 2025, Vince Russo, a high-profile pro wrestling writer and booker, was announced as an on-screen investor in JCW and would take up the role of the lead writer for the promotion.

During the Hallowicked taping on October 31, 2025 in Detroit, Matt Cardona would defeat 2 Tuff Tony to win the JCW Heavyweight Championship. One day after the episode aired, it was announced that Matt Cardona had signed a contract with WWE and made his return on Friday Night SmackDown on January 2, 2026 and would vacate all of the championships he had held before signing including the JCW Heavyweight Championship.

On January 17, 2026 during the Carnival of Chaos Tour in Denver, Colorado, Facade won the JCW American Championship for the first time after defeating Ninja Mack. On January 18, 2026 in Albuquerque, New Mexico, Mr. Anderson won the JCW World Heavyweight Championship which was vacated when Matt Cardona had signed with WWE by defeating James Storm.

=== Storylines ===
Juggalo Weekend featured professional wrestling matches that involves different wrestlers from pre-existing scripted feuds and storylines. Wrestlers portrayed villains, heroes, or less distinguishable characters in scripted events that built tension and culminated in a wrestling match or series of matches. Storylines were produced on Juggalo Championship Wrestling's various events and on their weekly show, JCW Lunacy.

=== Results ===
Night 1 - February 27, 2026
No.	Results	Stipulations
1	2 Tuff Tony and Willie Mack defeated The Outbreak (Abel Booker and Jacksyn Crowley) by pinfall	Tag team match
2	CoKane defeated Disco Ray (with The Ring Rat) by pinfall	Singles match
3	Dani Mo defeated Alice Crowley by pinfall	Singles match
4	Haley J and The Brothers of Funstruction (Ruffo The Clown and Yabo The Clown) defeated Facade, Mickie Knuckles and Tarzan Duran by pinfall	Six wrestler tag team match
5	Mr. Anderson (c) defeated Kerry Morton by pinfall	Singles match for the JCW World Heavyweight Championship
(c) / – the champion(s) heading into the match

Night 2 - February 28, 2026
No.	Results	Stipulations
1	Kerry Morton defeated Mickie Knuckles by pinfall	Singles match
2	The Brothers of Funstruction (Ruffo The Clown and Yabo The Clown) defeated The Outbreak (Abel Booker and Jacksyn Crowley) (with Barnabas The Bizarre) by pinfall	Tag team match
3	Mr. Anderson (c) defeated Disco Ray (w/The Ring Rat)	Singles match for the JCW World Heavyweight Championship
4	CoKane defeated Mr. Anderson (c) by pinfall	Singles match for the JCW World Heavyweight Championship
(c) / – the champion(s) heading into the match
