= March Massacre Tour =

2026 Juggalo Championship Wrestling tour

- Promotion: Juggalo Championship Wrestling
- Date: March 20–21, 2026 (aired April 9 and April 16, 2026)
- City: Night 1: Detroit, Michigan; Night 2: Saginaw, Michigan
- Venue: Night 1: Harpos Concert Theatre; Night 2: The Vault

Juggalo Championship Wrestling event chronology
← Previous; Juggalo Weekend	Next → Panic Zone

The March Massacre Tour was a professional wrestling tour produced by Juggalo Championship Wrestling (JCW) which took place on March 20, 2026 at Harpos Concert Theatre in Detroit, Michigan and March 21, 2026 at The Vault in Saginaw, Michigan and was free admission excluding select VIP seating. Both nights consisted of tapings for episodes of JCW Lunacy which aired on April 9, 2026 and April 16, 2026 on YouTube and Facebook.

== Production ==
=== Background ===
Other on-screen personnel
Role:	Name:
Disc jockey	DJ Clay
Commentators	Joe Dombrowski
Commentators	Mark Roberts
Commentators	Vince Russo
Commentators	Caleb Konley
Ring announcer	Kid Cadet
Interviewer	Mac Davis

Since 2025, Juggalo Championship Wrestling has taped occasional free admission events beginning with a taping in Reno, Nevada on October 21, 2025 with the main event of the show being Cocaine vs. Steven Flowe. On November 22, 2025, JCW held a free admission taping at the Harpos Concert Theatre in Detroit, Michigan in which free turkeys would be handed out to select attendees.

On the January 29, 2026 episode of JCW Lunacy, Facade won the JCW American Championship after defeating Ninja Mack in a best out of three match series. After a hiatus from JCW, Violent J returned to the promotion as a limo driver for Big Vito on the February 19, 2026 episode of JCW Lunacy.

From February 20, 2026 to February 22, 2026, JCW held three free admission tapings for JCW Lunacy at the Vault in Saginaw, Michigan, Harpos Concert Theatre in Detroit, Michigan, and Grewal Hall at 224 in Lansing, Michigan.

=== Storylines ===
The March Massacre Tour featured professional wrestling matches that involves different wrestlers from pre-existing scripted feuds and storylines. Wrestlers portrayed villains, heroes, or less distinguishable characters in scripted events that built tension and culminated in a wrestling match or series of matches. Storylines were produced on Juggalo Championship Wrestling's various events and on their weekly internet show JCW Lunacy.

== Results ==
Night 1 - March 20, 2026
No.	Results	Stipulations	Times
1	Alice Crowley defeated Haley J (c) by pinfall	Singles match for the JCW Women's Championship	6:18
2	The Neon Blondes (Dani Mo and Facade) defeated J-Rod and Shane Mercer by pinfall	Tag team match	10:06
3	2 Tuff Tony and Willie Mack (c) defeated The Outbreak (Abel Booker and Jacksyn Crowley) (with Barnabas The Bizarre) by pinfall	Tag team match for the JCW World Tag Team Championship	10:54
4	PCO defeated Luigi Primo by pinfall	Singles match	2:32
5	CoKane (c) defeated Steven Flowe by pinfall	Singles match for the JCW World Heavyweight Championship	6:25
(c) / – the champion(s) heading into the match

Night 2 - March 21, 2026
No.	Results	Stipulations	Times
1	Dani Mo defeated Alice Crowley and J-Rod by pinfall	Three way match	6:38
2	PCO defeated Luigi Primo by pinfall	Sicilian street fight	4:06
3	St. Claire Monster Corporation (Beastman, Kongo Kong, and Mr. Happy) (with Jasmin St. Claire) defeated Disco Ray and The Brothers of Funstruction (Ruffo The Clown and Yabo The Clown) (with The Ring Rat) by pinfall	Six-man tag team match	4:09
4	Caleb Konley (with Vince Russo) vs. Nic Nemeth ended in a no contest	Best two out of three falls match	10:48
5	CoKane (c) defeated Shane Mercer by pinfall	Singles match for the JCW World Heavyweight Championship	11:49
(c) / – the champion(s) heading into the match
