= JCW Houston Heat =

2025 Juggalo Championship Wrestling event

Houston Heat
- Promotional poster
- Promotion: Juggalo Championship Wrestling
- Date: September 15, 2025 (aired October 9, 2025)
- City: Houston, Texas
- Venue: White Oak Music Hall

Juggalo Championship Wrestling event chronology
← Previous; Ultra Live Monster 5: Juggalo Island Show	Next → 2 Tuff Country

Houston Heat was a professional wrestling special event produced by Juggalo Championship Wrestling which took place on September 13, 2025 at the White Oak Music Hall in Houston, Texas and was aired on tape delay October 9, 2025 as a special episode of JCW Lunacy on YouTube and Facebook. The event was followed up with a concert by Ganksta N-I-P.

== Production ==
=== Background ===
After a four-week hiatus following the 2 Day War pay-per-view ending with 2 Tuff Tony winning the JCW Heavyweight Championship against Matt Tremont, JCW returned with a live episode of Lunacy at the Bomb Factory in Dallas, Texas. During the episode, Vampiro made his return to JCW as a commentator alongside Veda Scott who provided commentary for the Powder Keg pay-per-view. In addition to the new additions to the commentary team, Suicide made his debut in the promotion after being revealed by Luigi Primo to be his tag team partner. However, technical difficulties had caused the episode to be re-taped in San Antonio, Texas. The episode also saw the JCW debut of Ninja Mack who fought Caleb Konley in a non-title match. On the 49th episode of Lunacy during the main event, 2 Tuff Tony defended the JCW Heavyweight Championship against Kerry Morton who had been absent since the 2 Day War pay-per-view. However, Haley J and her tag team partner Luscious Lawrence attacked Tony and resulted in the match being declared a no contest. During the Ultra Live Monster 5: Juggalo Island Show on September 13, 2025, 2 Tuff Tony and Amazing Maria fought against Haley J and Luscious Lawrence in the main event to culminate a feud which had started with Haley J and Lawrence attacking Tony. On September 14, 2025 during a taping for the October 2, 2025 episode of JCW Lunacy after a six-man tag team match, the St. Claire Monster Corporation consisting of Kongo Kong and Mr. Happy and managed by Jasmin St. Claire attacked their teammate Painful Paul after losing to the Outbreak consisting of Jacksyn Crowley and Abel Booker, Bizircus, and their manager Barnabas The Bizarre.

=== Storylines ===
Houston Heat featured professional wrestling matches that involves different wrestlers from pre-existing scripted feuds and storylines. Wrestlers portrayed villains, heroes, or less distinguishable characters in scripted events that built tension and culminated in a wrestling match or series of matches. Storylines were produced on Juggalo Championship Wrestling's various events and on their weekly internet show JCW Lunacy.

== Results ==
Other on-screen personnel
Role:	Name:
Commentators	Joe Dombrowski
Commentators	Mark Roberts
Commentators	Veda Scott
Ring announcer	The Ringmaster

No.	Results	Stipulations	Times
1	Willie Mack defeated Suicide by pinfall	Singles match	7:17
2	Mr. Happy (with Jasmin St. Claire defeated Cocaine by pinfall	Singles match	3:50
3	Amazing Maria and Haley J defeated Alice Crowley and Jazmin Allure	Tag team match	6:12
4	Painful Paul defeated Moshtronaut Mike by pinfall	Singles match	1:04
5	Bizircus (with Barnabas The Bizarre) defeated Luigi Primo by pinfall	Singles match	3:18
6	Caleb Konley (with Jeeves) (c) defeated James Storm	Singles match for the JCW American Championship	7:13
7	The Brothers of Funstruction (Ruffo The Clown and Yabo The Clown) (c) defeated Bustah And The Brain (Alec Price and Jordan Oliver), Club Soda (Puf and Squirt), The Outbreak (Abel Booker and Jacksyn Crowley) (with Barnabas The Bizarre) by pinfall	Four way tag team match for the JCW Tag Team Championship	7:18
8	Kerry Morton defeated Ninja Mack by pinfall	Singles match	7:03
9	2 Tuff Tony (c) defeated Kongo Kong (with Jasmin St. Claire and Mr. Happy) by pinfall	Singles match for the JCW Heavyweight Championship	11:28
(c) / – the champion(s) heading into the match
