= Hybrid Wrestling =

American independent professional wrestling promotion

- Acronym: Hybrid
- Founded: 2016
- Style: Professional wrestling
- Headquarters: Mount Holly, New Jersey
- Founder: Mike Hamilton
- Owner(s): Mike Hamilton; Mike Hamilton Jr.
- Formerly: Hybrid Wrestling Association

Hybrid Wrestling (Hybrid), formerly Hybrid Wrestling Association (HWA), is an independent professional wrestling promotion headquartered in Mount Holly, New Jersey and is owned by Mike Hamilton and Mike Hamilton Jr..

== History ==
On December 31, 2020, Hybrid Wrestling held a joint show with Game Changer Wrestling which served as the pre-show for GCW's Good Riddance pay-per-view at Showboat Resort Atlantic City in Atlantic City, New Jersey.

On November 5, 2021 during Hybrid's Friday Night Fights at Harrah's Philadelphia in Chester, Pennsylvania, Holidead defended the MPW Championship against Tasha Steelz.

On January 6, 2026, Game Changer Wrestling (GCW) announced the lineup for the 2026 Collective which included the return of Hybrid Wrestling after a 5-year hiatus in a cross-promotional event with Mount Holly, New Jersey-based promotion Pro Wrestling Unplugged (PWU).

In addition to the announcement of Hybrid's return, the promotion introduced the Hybrid Championship on March 13, 2026 during Super Powers of Wrestling's (SPO) live weekly broadcast in Mount Holly, New Jersey with the first champion being Feral Face and the Hybrid Women's Championship on February 21, 2026 during Pro Wrestling Unplugged's Mad Love event with the first champion being Ruthie Jay.

On April 15, 2026 during the Hybrid x PWU Midnight Xpress pay-per-view, Mia Friday won the Hybrid Women's Championship in a four-way match which featured Kiera Hogan as the referee.

== Championships ==
| Championship | Current champion(s) | Date won | Days held | Event | Location | Notes |
|---|---|---|---|---|---|---|
| Hybrid Championship | Feral Face | March 13, 2026 | 205+ | SPO Live | Mount Holly, New Jersey | |
| Hybrid Women's Championship | Mia Friday | April 15, 2026 | 172+ | Hybrid x PWU Midnight Xpress | Paradise, Nevada | Defeated Ruthie Jay, Brittnie Brooks, and Jazmin Allure in a four-way match for the SPO Women's Championship and the Hybrid Women's Championship. |
