= Pitbull/Public Enemy Memorial Cup =

- Promotion: Pro Wrestling Unplugged
- Date: October 20, 2006
- City: Philadelphia, Pennsylvania
- Venue: New Alhambra Arena

The Pitbull/Public Enemy Memorial Cup was a professional wrestling memorial event produced by the Pro Wrestling Unplugged (PWU) promotion, which took place on October 20, 2006, at the New Alhambra Arena in Philadelphia, Pennsylvania. The show was held in honor of the deceased members of The Pitbulls (Anthony Durante) and The Public Enemy (Rocco Rock and Johnny Grunge), both popular tag teams during the early years of Extreme Championship Wrestling, and featured some of the top tag teams on the independent circuit in an 8-team tournament. In keeping with ECW tradition, all matches were no-countout/no-disqualification. Twelve professional wrestling matches were featured on the event's card, with three including championships.

All Money Is Legal (K-Murda and K-Pusha) won the tournament by winning three matches at the event. Over the course of the evening, they defeated The S.A.T. (Joel Maximo and Jose Maximo) in the quarter-finals, The Backseat Boyz (Johnny Kashmere and Trent Acid) in the semi-finals and The Rottweilers (Homicide and Ricky Reyes) in the final match. Tod Gordon and Gary Wolfe, the sole surviving member of The Pitbulls, presented the 7-foot trophy to All Money Is Legal following their victory. K-Murda and K-Pusha were joined in the ring by The Backseat Boyz and The S.A.T. who congratulated the winners by lifting them on to their shoulders while The Public Enemy's theme music played in the background.

Several other matches were held at the event in addition to the tournament. The main event was a standard wrestling match for the PWU Heavyweight Championship between the champion, Devon Moore, and the challenger, Azrieal, in which Azrieal won by countout. The undercard also featured Corporal Robinson successfully defending the PWU Hardcore Championship in three consecutive matches with victories over Aramis, KC Blade and Pete Hunter. The other match was for the PWU Unified Women's Intergender Championship, in which Mercedes Martinez successfully defended the belt in an intergender match against Detox and was awarded the match via disqualification.

A number of websites have given the show positive reviews; 411mania.com rated the event a 6.0 and OnlineWorldofWrestling.com a 7.5 out of 10. Brett Schwan of WrestlingClothesline.com called the event "a very enjoyable DVD".

== Results ==
October 20, 2006 in Philadelphia, Pennsylvania (Viking Hall)

#	Results	Stipulations	Times
1	The Briscoe Brothers (Mark and Jay Briscoe) defeated The Krash Krew (Kwame and Gemini)	Pitbull/Public Enemy Memorial Cup Quarter-Final match	n/a
2	The Backseat Boyz (Johnny Kashmere and Trent Acid) defeated The Angus Brothers (Billy Angus and Danny Angus)	Pitbull/Public Enemy Memorial Cup Quarter-Final match	n/a
3	The Rottweilers (Homicide and Ricky Reyes) defeated The Outcast Killaz (Diablo Santiago & Oman Tortuga)	Pitbull/Public Enemy Memorial Cup Quarter-Final match	n/a
4	All Money Is Legal (K-Murda & K-Pusha) defeated The S.A.T. (Joel and Jose Maximo)	Pitbull/Public Enemy Memorial Cup Quarter-Final match	n/a
5	Mercedes Martinez (c) defeated Detox by disqualification	Singles match for the PWU Unified Women's Title Intergender Championship	n/a
6	Corporal Robinson (c) defeated Aramis	Singles match for the PWU Hardcore Championship	n/a
7	Corporal Robinson (c) defeated KC Blade	Singles match for the PWU Hardcore Championship	n/a
8	Corporal Robinson (c) defeated Pete Hunter	Singles match for the PWU Hardcore Championship	n/a
9	The Rottweilers (Homicide and Ricky Reyes) defeated Jay Briscoe and Joker	Pitbull/Public Enemy Memorial Cup Semi-Final match	n/a
10	All Money Is Legal (K-Murda and K-Pusha) defeated The Backseat Boyz (Johnny Kashmere and Trent Acid)	Pitbull/Public Enemy Memorial Cup Semi-Final match	n/a
11	Azrieal defeated Devon Moore (c) by countout	Singles match for the PWU Heavyweight Championship	n/a
12	All Money Is Legal (K-Murda and K-Pusha) defeated The Rottweilers (Homicide and Ricky Reyes)	Pitbull And Public Enemy Memorial Cup Final match	n/a

=== Tournament brackets ===
The tournament took place on October 20, 2006. The tournament brackets were:

Quarterfinals
The Briscoe Brothers	Pin
The Krash Krew
The Rotweillers	Pin
The Outcast Killaz
The Backseat Boyz	Pin
The Angus Brothers
All Money is Legal	Pin
The SAT

Semifinals
Jay Briscoe and Joker^{1}
The Rotweillers	Pin
The Backseat Boyz
All Money Is Legal	Pin

Final
The Rotweillers
All Money Is Legal	Pin

1. Mark Briscoe was injured during the quarter-final match when his brother Jay accidentally hit him in the face with a steel chair. It was later announced that several of Mark's teeth had been knocked out and had to be taken to the hospital. Jay chose to continue the tournament with Joker, however, his new tag team partner turned on him allowing The Rotweillers to advance to the final.
