= Ultra Live Monster 5: Juggalo Island Show =

2025 Juggalo Championship Wrestling event and special Insane Clown Posse concert

- Promotional poster
- Promotion: Juggalo Championship Wrestling
- Date: September 13, 2025 (aired September 25, 2025)
- City: South Padre Island, Texas
- Venue: Clayton's Beach Bar & Event Venue

Juggalo Championship Wrestling event chronology
← Previous; JCW vs. GCW: The 2 Day War	Next → Houston Heat

The Ultra Live Monster 5: Juggalo Island Show was a professional wrestling special event and concert produced by Juggalo Championship Wrestling and Psychopathic Records which took place on September 13, 2025 at Clayton's Beach Bar & Event Venue in South Padre Island, Texas and was aired on September 25, 2025 as a special episode of JCW Lunacy on YouTube and Facebook. The wrestling event was followed up with live performances by the Insane Clown Posse, Ganksta N-I-P, Rellik, and Death Deala.

== Production ==
=== Background ===
Other on-screen personnel
Role:	Name:
Disc Jockey	DJ Clay
Commentators	Mark Roberts
Commentators	Veda Scott
Ring announcers	The Ringmaster

On June 20, 2025, Psychopathic Records announced the Juggalo Island show, the final event in a series of concerts titled Ultra Live Monster 5. At the time, it was not officially confirmed that JCW would be part of the concert until the tour was announced on July 29, 2025 with JCW tapings being held on select dates on the tour.

After a four-week hiatus following the 2 Day War pay-per-view ending with 2 Tuff Tony winning the JCW Heavyweight Championship against Matt Tremont, JCW returned with a live episode of Lunacy at the Bomb Factory in Dallas, Texas. During the episode, Vampiro made his return to JCW as a commentator alongside Veda Scott who provided commentary for the Powder Keg pay-per-view. In addition to the new additions to the commentary team, Suicide made his debut in the promotion after being revealed by Luigi Primo to be his tag team partner. However, technical difficulties had caused the episode to be re-taped in San Antonio, Texas. The episode also saw the JCW debut of Ninja Mack who fought Caleb Konley in a non-title match. On the 49th episode of Lunacy during the main event, 2 Tuff Tony defended the JCW Heavyweight Championship against Kerry Morton who had been absent since the 2 Day War pay-per-view. However, Haley J and her tag team partner Luscious Lawrence attacked Tony and resulted in the match being declared a no contest.

=== Storylines ===
Ultra Live Monster 5: Juggalo Island Show featured professional wrestling matches that involves different wrestlers from pre-existing scripted feuds and storylines. Wrestlers portrayed villains, heroes, or less distinguishable characters in scripted events that built tension and culminated in a wrestling match or series of matches. Storylines were produced on Juggalo Championship Wrestling's various events and on their weekly internet show JCW Lunacy.

== Results ==
No.	Results	Stipulations	Times
1	James Storm and Willie Mack defeated Caleb Konley and Kerry Morton (with Jeeves) by pinfall	Tag team match	7:35
2	Ninja Mack defeated Kenny King by pinfall	Singles match	5:14
3	St. Claire Monster Corporation (Kongo Kong, Mr. Happy, and Painful Paul) (with Jasmin St. Claire) defeated Club Soda (Puf and Squirt) and Cocaine by pinfall	Six man tag team match	6:54
4	Alice Crowley (c) defeated Mosh Pit Michelle by pinfall	Singles match for the JCW Women's Championship	3:15
5	2 Tuff Tony and Amazing Maria defeated Haley J and Luscious Lawrence by pinfall	Tag team match	11:22
(c) / – the champion(s) heading into the match

== Music performers ==
- Ganksta N-I-P
- Rellik
- Death Deala
- Insane Clown Posse
