= Club Space =

Nightclub in Miami, Florida, US

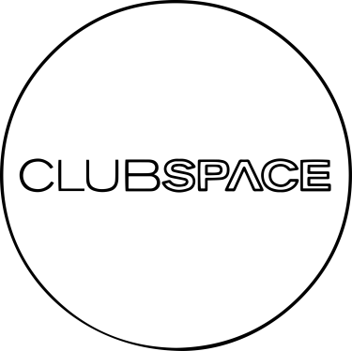

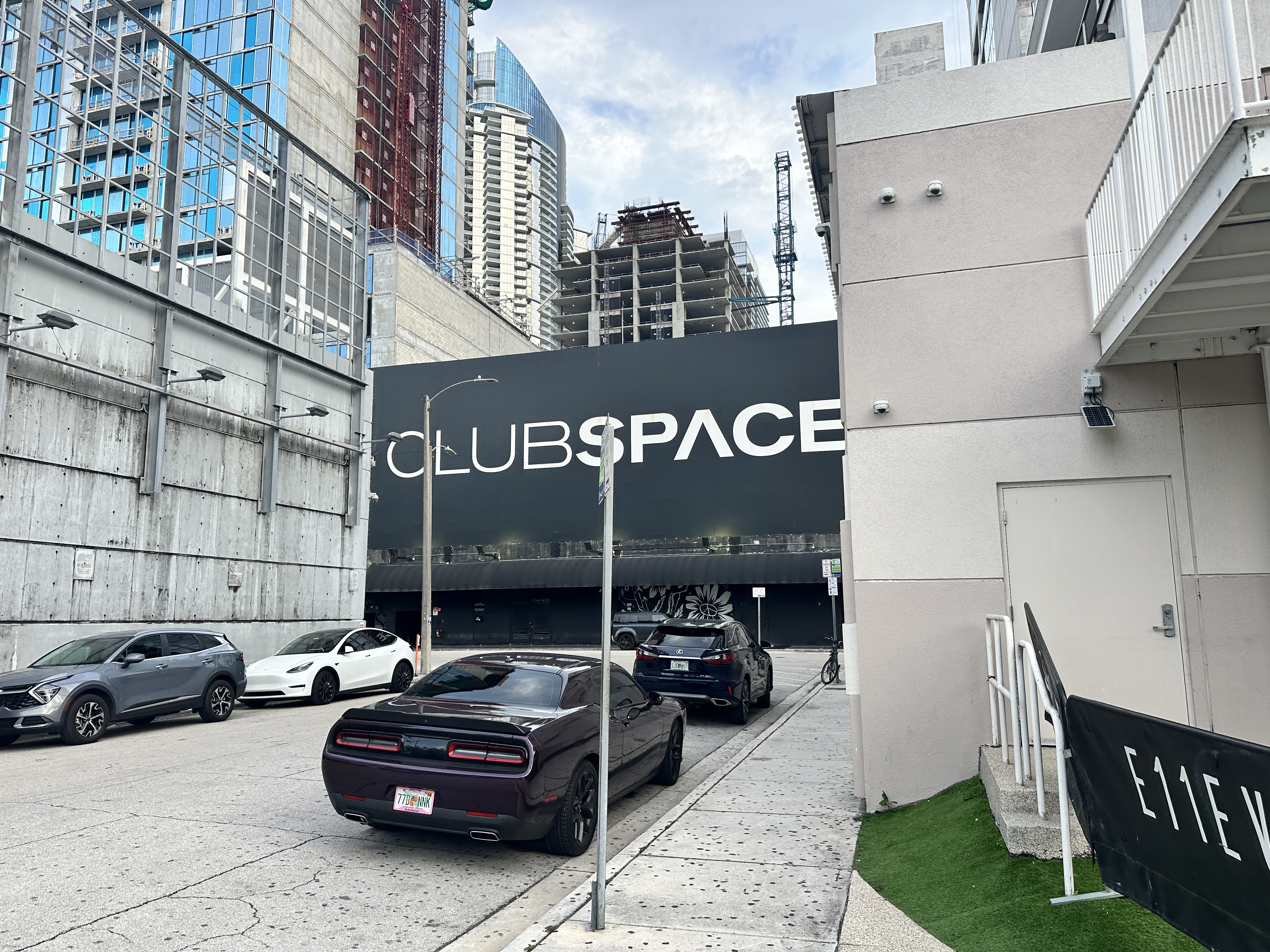
- The exterior of Club Space
- Interactive map of the Club Space area

General information
- Location: 34 NE 11 Street, Miami, FL, 33132, United States
- Opened: 2000

Technical details
- Floor count: 3

Website
- https://www.clubspace.com/

Club Space is a nightclub located in Miami, Florida. The venue was originally opened in March 2000 by Louis Puig, a native to Miami, and the club has a 24-hour license to serve alcohol. Club Space is currently owned and operated by Link Miami Rebels, led by Coloma Kaboomsky, David Sinopoli, and Davide Danese, which also is a key player in the operations of Factory Town nearby in Hialeah.

== Background and History ==
=== Early history (2000-2013) ===
Although iconic EDM clubs like the Warehouse in Chicago originally served as safe spaces for marginalized communities to express their racial and sexual identities, the genre's global rise in the 1990s brought it into the mainstream. In Miami, the 2000s saw the emergence of several high-profile clubs that concentrated wealth and influence within a limited number of exclusive venues.

When developing plans for the club, Puig knew that he would not be able to compete with the after-hours nightclubs in Miami, so Puig's lawyer connected him with the director of Miami's Downtown Development Association, and supported the idea because the association viewed nightclubs as the seeds to start entertainment districts. According to Puig, the idea to name the club as Space came from his marketing director, because of the massive amount of space inside of it. On their opening night, Club Space hosted Danny Tenaglia, and given his popularity at the time, other DJs contacted the club to play there because of Danny playing there. For the first three years, Space was only open on Saturdays with two rooms: a Red Room and a Blue Room.

Club Space underwent its first major renovation in 2010. The announcement of Space's temporary closure on its website, framed as an Ibiza-style seasonal break, left out mentions of a renovation. Although an independent club promoter confirmed these renovation plans, venue management remained unresponsive to inquiries when Miami New Times journalists reached out for comment.

=== Changing hands (2013-2019) ===
Club Space changed hands multiple times in the 2010s. In late 2013, Puig sold the venue to Roman Jones and Justin Levine of Opium Group, who ran it for three years. During this time, Puig recalled in an interview to Billboard that The Opium Group was trying to create space-like institutions in South Beach, to little success. By late 2016, local promoters Coloma Kaboomsky, Davide Danese, and David Sinopoli gained control of Club Space. Sinopoli co-founded Miami's III Points Festival, and Danese and Kaboomsky were known for their Link Miami Rebels parties; Link Miami Rebels would later become the entity which presently operates Club Space.

=== Insomniac (2019-present) ===
The nightlife company Insomniac, a competitor to Miami's Ultra Music Festival which organizes Electric Daisy Carnival and is owned by Live Nation Entertainment, acquired an ownership stake in Club Space in 2019.

In 2024, Club Space closed from May to October, in order to both renovate and assist in the redevelopment of 11th Street as the nightclub and strip club hybrid venue E11even was constructing a hotel and residential condo towers across the street from its main facility, with Space between both planned towers. The surrounding project required that the club make structural alterations in line with the City of Miami's building and fire-safety standards.

== Venue ==
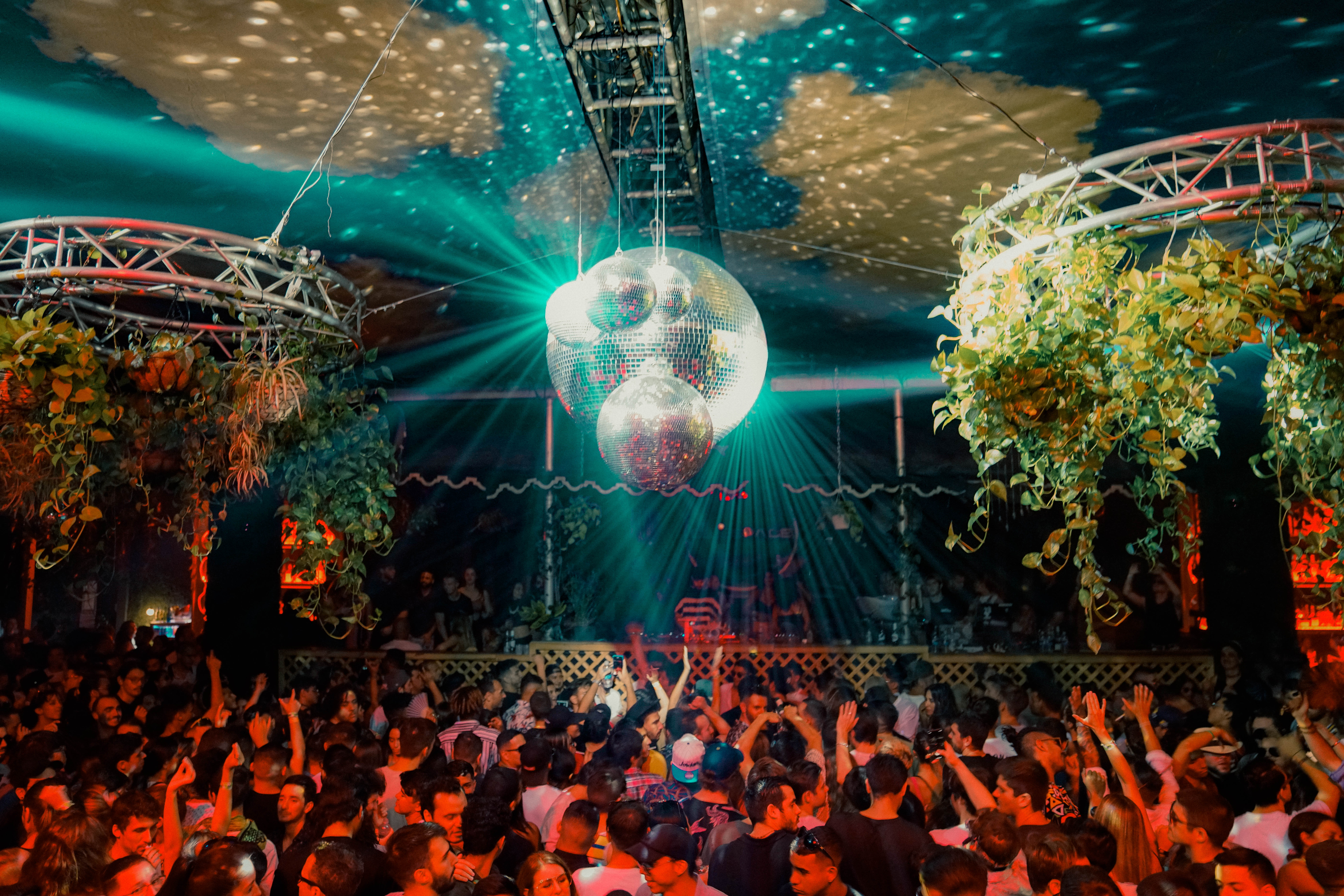
The terrace at Club Space in 2019

Club Space has a capacity of 2,000 people, and is made up of three rooms: The Terrace, the Ground, and Floyd. Originally, though, Club Space started with a strategic "hybrid environment" featuring multiple rooms, each with a unique musical focus. The Red Room offered house, the Blue Room trance, and a new hip-hop room actively diversified its clientele, attracting club-goers who might not have otherwise found their place in Miami's nightlife.

=== The Terrace ===
Club Space's outdoor upper area, known as The Terrace, is one of the most covered parts of the venue, and is where Space is known for its sunrise parties. Originally open-air, the terrace now features a retractable transparent roof, maintaining the outdoor vibe while protecting guests from the elements. In its early years, convincing partygoers to transition from the dark dancefloor to the bright morning light was a challenge—solved with creative events like the first themed “Ibiza patio party,” complete with farm animals, hay bales, popsicles, and sunglasses giveaways. The strategy worked, and the terrace quickly became a core part of the Club Space experience. Despite being exposed to extreme weather conditions before the installation of the roof, the terrace gained a loyal following drawn by its music and atmosphere. One memorable Miami Music Week event during heavy rain saw the dancefloor flood, turning the space into an impromptu water party where patrons embraced the chaos, dancing in the water as unplanned sets from top DJs.

=== The Ground ===
Club Space's "The Ground" is a darker, techno-like and bass-heavy lower level beneath Club Space's terrace. The Ground is mostly known for bringing in underground artists and local bands, able to accommodate live music.

=== Floyd ===
Floyd is a room within the Club Space which resembles a speakeasy and sells tickets separately. Predominantly a house and techno venue, Floyd has been known to host jazz and reggaeton occasionally as well.

== Notable performers ==
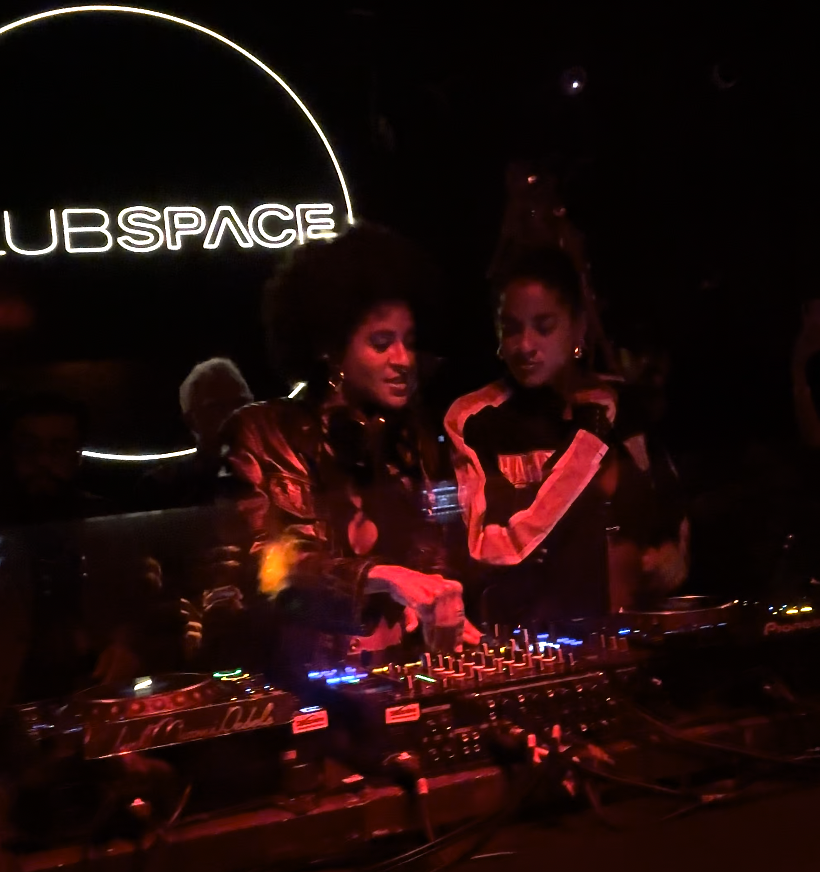
Coco & Breezy playing a set at Club Space

- Claptone
- Coco & Breezy
- Danny Tenaglia
- Deep Dish
- Fisher
- John Summit
- Tiësto
- Victor Calderone
