= Coco & Breezy =

American musical sibling duo

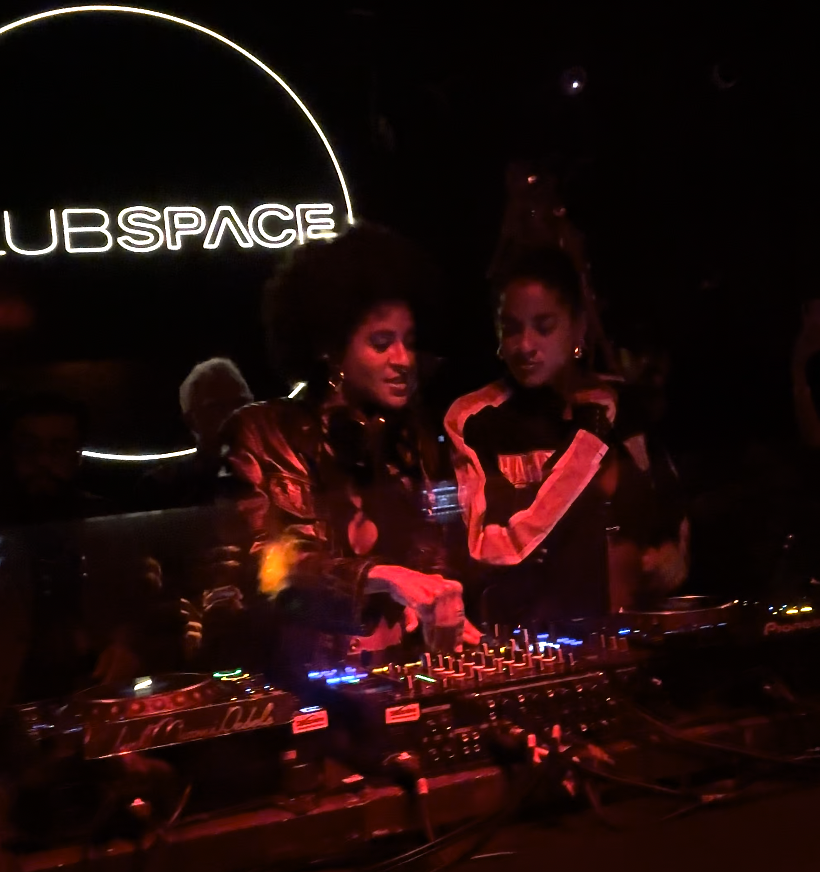
- Coco & Breezy at Miami's Club Space in 2025

Background information
- Origin: Apple Valley, Minnesota, U.S
- Genres: House; tech house
- Years active: 2009–present
- Label: Insomniac
- Members: Corianna Dotson; Brianna Dotson
- Website: www.cocoandbreezymusic.com

Coco & Breezy are an American DJ duo, consisting of identical twin sisters Corianna ("Coco") and Brianna ("Breezy") Dotson (born August 4, 1990).

== Early life ==
Corianna and Brianna Dotson were born on 4 August 1990. They were raised in Apple Valley, Minnesota and are of African American and Puerto Rican descent. After graduating high school, the sisters moved to New York City with just $1,000.

In 2009, at the age of 19, the sisters founded their sunglasses company, Coco & Breezy. Based in the United States, the brand gained recognition for its unique designs, which have been worn by high-profile celebrities such as Prince, Kelly Osbourne, Lady Gaga, Nicki Minaj and Serena Williams. In April 2012, Adidas announced that they would be enlisting the design help of the sisters in their "Originals White Space Project."

== Music career ==
After several years of building their fashion brand, Coco & Breezy turned their focus to music, releasing their own material and performing at prominent events such as Electric Daisy Carnival, Lightning In A Bottle and Coachella. They have supported artists including MK, Fatboy Slim, Thundercat, Chromeo, Channel Tres and Sofi Tukker.

In 2024, Coco & Breezy held a DJ residency at Ushuaïa Ibiza.

== Discography ==
=== Singles ===
List of singles, with year released and album name shown
Title	Year	Album	
"Differences"	2018	Non-album singles	
"Convo"	2020	Non-album singles	
"U"	2020	Non-album singles	
"Lemme See "	2021	Non-album singles	
"Liftin Me Up"	2021	Non-album singles	
"Magic (ft. Baby Sol)"	2023	Non-album singles	
"Just Say (ft. Tara Carosielli)"	2023	Non-album singles	
"Off My Mind (ft. Sam White)"		Non-album singles	
"There Is A Light"		Non-album singles	
"Manifest"	2024	Non-album singles	
"I Am Free"	2024	Non-album singles	
"Change Your Mind (ft. Blush'ko)"		Non-album singles	
"Sunday Best" with AlunaGeorge		Non-album singles	
"Blessed Generation" with Kinder	2025	Non-album singles	
"Dreams" with Hadiya George	2025	Non-album singles	2025
