= E11even =

Nightclub in Miami, Florida

Coordinates: 25.7847°N 80.1935°W

E11EVEN Miami
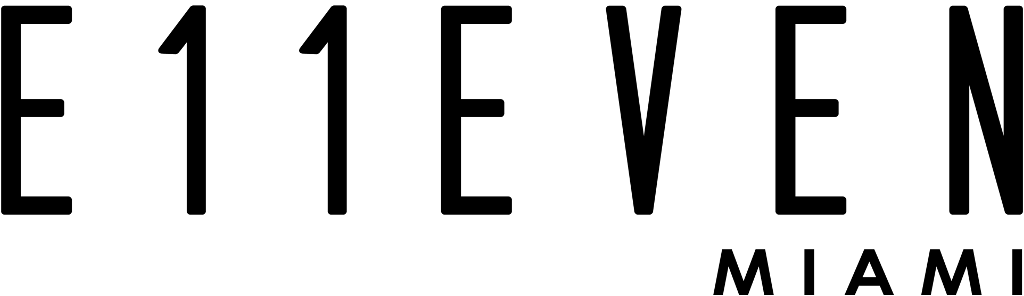
- Interactive map of E11EVEN Miami
- Address: 29 NE 11th St; Miami, FL; United States
- Owner: 11USA Group
- Type: Bar; nightclub
- Surface: 20,000 sqft

Construction
- Opened: February 5, 2014
- Years active: 12

Website
- 11miami.com

E11EVEN is an American luxury lifestyle brand mostly known for its 24-hour Ultraclub located in Miami, Florida. The brand, which has since expanded into a vodka brand, record label and a currently under construction condo tower complex in Miami, which is controlled by the holding company 11USA Group.

Construction of E11EVEN Miami was completed in 2013, and it was first opened to the public on February 5, 2014. The club was originally created by Dennis DeGori alongside Marc Roberts and Michael Simkins, and is run by DeGori alongside five other operating partners: Daniel Solomon, Gino Lopinto, Frances Martin, Derick Henry, and Ken DeGori. The club is situated near Club Space another popular downtown Miami club.

E11EVEN itself grew as a brand by hosting pop-up parties at seven Super Bowls, the 2018 FIFA World Cup, the Cannes Film Festival and the Monaco Grand Prix. In November 2025, the club celebrated its eleventh birthday and was named as the best nightclub in the United States and the sixth overall in the world by the International Nightlife Association.

On April 13, 2021, E11EVEN Miami became the first major nightclub in America to accept Bitcoin. In 2021, the club ventured into residential housing, with two 649-foot (198 m) towers, with one under construction in 2023. In 2025, E11EVEN Club Hotel and Residences were announced to be completed that year, with 449 fully furnished luxury residences, and amenities such as the E11EVEN Day Club and pool on the 11th floor. The second tower is labeled the E11EVEN Club Residences Beyond, and slated to include amenities such as additional club space, executive offices and workspaces.

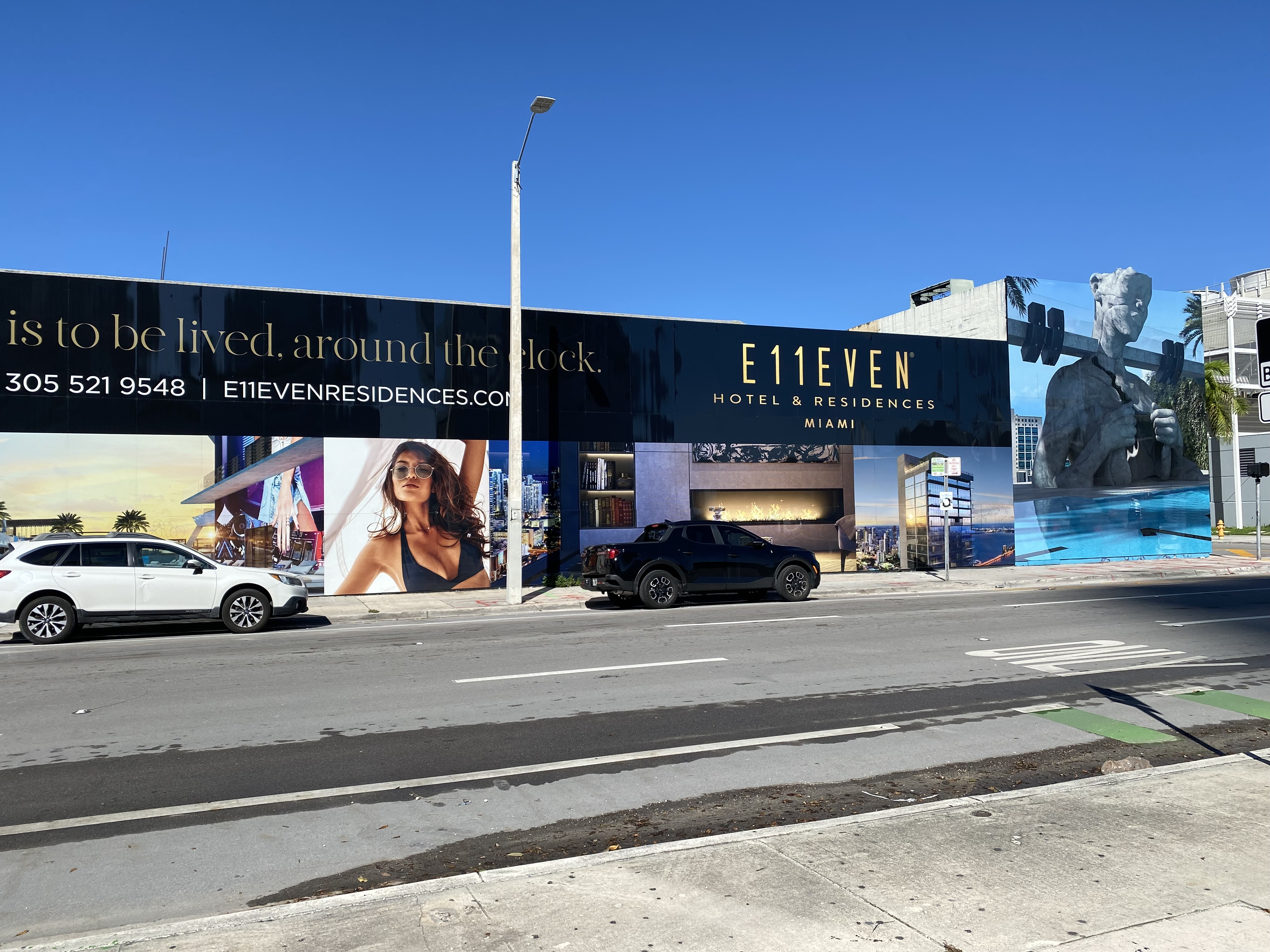
A display in Miami advertising E11even's residences

In 2023, as part of the Miami Music week the club announced performances of Nicky Romero, Diplo and Idris Elba, deadmau5, Cedric Gervais and Marshmello listed as performers. E11EVEN has been noted for hosting several high-profile patrons, with celebrities such as Drake, Rihanna, G-Eazy, and Post Malone attending events at the club.

The Florida Panthers have celebrated at the club twice after they won the Stanley Cup in June 2024 and 2025, each time with the team bringing the cup inside the club. For their second win in 2025, a rematch against the Edmonton Oilers, the team's bill at E11EVEN totaled to $500,000, though according to Panthers forward Matthew Tkachuk, the venue covered the bill for the entire team. In 2025, the club listed champagne bottles ranging from $395 for a bottle of Perrier Jouët Grand Brut to $12,500 for three liters of Dom Pérignon. Following the US men's Olympic hockey teams win in the 2026 Winter Olympics, the team celebrated at the club after their flight was diverted to Miami due to the ongoing blizzard in the Northeast. Video and images from the celebration were posted to social media, showing the team celebrating with the crowd and signing along to music.

From November to December 2026, the club briefly renamed itself to NINE1NINE in honor of the release of Grand Theft Auto VI, which features the fictional club inspired by the real E11EVEN, with Flo Rida being the first act to perform.

== Legal issues ==
The club is a named defendant in a 2024 lawsuit related to an automobile crash involving Maecee Lathers.

In 2025, Pascal Bourgeois filed suit against the club for compensatory damages after being assaulted, unlawfully arrested, falsely imprisoned, and injured by the security personnel and employees at the club.
