= Atomic Legacy Wrestling =

American professional wrestling promotion

- Acronym: ALW
- Founded: 2017
- Style: Professional wrestling
- Headquarters: Orlando, Florida
- Founder: Alex Red
- Owner(s): Alex Red; Jason Dugan; David Millan
- Formerly: Atomic Wrestling Entertainment; Atomic Revolutionary Wrestling

Atomic Legacy Wrestling (ALW), formerly Atomic Wrestling Entertainment (AWE) and Atomic Revolutionary Wrestling (ARW), is an American independent professional wrestling promotion based in Orlando, Florida.

== History ==
On February 11, 2017, Atomic Wrestling Entertainment (AWE) held its first event at the Cocoa Expo Sports Center in Cocoa, Florida. Titled The Beginning: (R)Evolution, the event crowned the inaugural AWE Cruiserweight Champion in a four way match featuring Chasyn Rance, Adam Ace, Chris Silvio, and Nick Nero, the inaugural AWE Tag Team Champions in a match featuring Terrell Dudley and Terrence Dudley fighting against Jason Dugan and La Dinamita Solar, and the inaugural AWE Heavyweight Champion in a main event match featuring CJ O'Doyle fighting against Axx Clover.

In the summer of 2018, AWE changed its name to Atomic Revolutionary Wrestling (ARW) with the first show under the new name being Star Spangled Slammer 2 which took place on July 27, 2018 at the Space Coast Convention Center in Cocoa, Florida. On March 23, 2019, ARW made its South Florida debut with their Shamrock & Brawl 3 event in Dania Beach, Florida which featured Garett Bischoff and Wes Brisco defending the ARW Tag Team Championship against The Headbangers (Mosh and Thrashe) and Jesse Neal defending the ARW Heavyweight Championship against Axx Clover and Gangrel in a three way extreme rules match.

In 2023, ARW changed its name to Atomic Legacy Wrestling (ALW) and debuted the new name during the Break The Mold pay-per-view which took place on April 21, 2023 in Cocoa, Florida and was streamed live on FITE TV.

On March 28, 2025 ALW teamed up with Juggalo Championship Wrestling (JCW) to hold their first cross-promotional event. Titled JCW vs. ALW: Wicked Game, the event featured several notable JCW wrestlers including Mickie Knuckles, Caleb Konley, JCW owner Violent J, and many others. Also featured was a match for the vacant ALW Tag Team Championship featuring Ink Inc. fighting the Backseat Boyz, Mike Mondo who fought Caleb Konley, Simon Gotch who fought Marquise Mills who was defending the ALW Next Level Championship, and Willie Mack who defended the JCW Heavyweight Championship against Oddyssey. On July 27, 2025, ALW held their Star Spangled Slammer 9 pay-per-view at the Ocean Center arena in Daytona Beach, Florida which featured Nic Nemeth taking on Matt Cardona in the main event along. Other notable featured wrestlers who were at the event included at-the-time-recently-released WWE wrestler Elayna Black, Shelton Benjamin, Bobby Fish, Kenta, and The Good Brothers (Karl Anderson and Doc Gallows).

On May 22, 2026, ALW announced that former WWE NXT wrestler Andre Chase, who later adopted the ring name of Andre Chance two weeks after this announcement, would make his return to independent wrestling at the promotion's Star Spangled Slammer X event.

== Championships ==
=== Current ===
Championship	Current champion(s)	Date won	Days held	Location
ALW Hardcore Championship	D. Ramos	April 24, 2026	196+	Cocoa, Florida
ALW Next Level Championship	El Ridiculoso	October 10, 2025	392+	Cocoa, Florida
ALW Tag Team Championship	America's Most Wanted (Chris Harris and James Storm)	January 31, 2026	279+	Melbourne, Florida
ALW Women's Championship	Izzy Moreno	January 31, 2026	279+	Melbourne, Florida
ALW World Heavyweight Championship	Jamie Stanley	January 31, 2026	279+	Melbourne, Florida

=== Former ===
Championship	Final champion(s)	Date won	Days held	Location
ARW Rapid Fire Championship	Jason Dugan	July 27, 2018	N/A	Cocoa, Florida
