= Hybrid x PWU Midnight Xpress =

2026 professional wrestling pay-per-view event

- Promotional poster
- Promotion(s): Pro Wrestling Unplugged; Hybrid Wrestling
- Date: April 15, 2026
- City: Paradise, Nevada
- Venue: Horseshoe Las Vegas

Pay-per-view chronology
← Previous; Hybrid; GCW/Hybrid Good Riddance Pre-show; PWU; All Bets are Off	Next → Hybrid/PWU; Head to Head

Hybrid x PWU Midnight Xpress was a professional wrestling pay-per-view event co-produced by Hybrid Wrestling and Pro Wrestling Unplugged (PWU). The event took place on April 15, 2026 at Horseshoe Las Vegas in Paradise, Nevada and streamed live on Triller TV in conjunction with Game Changer Wrestling's (GCW) Collective during WrestleMania 42 weekend. The event was also the first Hybrid Wrestling show since 2021.

== Production ==
=== Background ===
On January 6, 2026, Game Changer Wrestling (GCW) announced the lineup for the 2026 Collective which included the return of Hybrid Wrestling after a 5-year hiatus in a cross-promotional event with Mount Holly, New Jersey-based promotion Pro Wrestling Unplugged (PWU). On February 1, 2026, Joey Janela won the PWU Legacy Championship by defeating Ric Blade. On April 10, 2026, PWU and their sister promotion Super Powers of Wrestling (SPO) held livestreamed special event titled All Bets Are Off in which Pat Dynamite defeated JP Grayson to become the new PWU World Champion. Prior to the Midnight Xpress event the same night during Dragon Gate USA's The Gate of Sin City pay-per-view, Alec Price had suffered a leg injury after falling from the stairs to the stage which had collapsed and was replaced by Ryan O'Neill.

=== Storylines ===
Hybrid x PWU Midnight Xpress featured professional wrestling matches that involves different wrestlers from pre-existing scripted feuds and storylines. Wrestlers portrayed villains, heroes, or less distinguishable characters in scripted events that built tension and culminated in a wrestling match or series of matches. Storylines were produced on Pro Wrestling Unplugged's various events and on their sister promotion Super Powers of Wrestling's (SPO) weekly show, SPO Live.

== Results ==
Other on-screen personnel
Role:	Name:
Commentators	Emil Jay
Commentators	John Mosley
Commentators	Righteous Reg
Ring announcers	Julie Cutler

No.	Results	Stipulations	Times
1	The BackSeat Boyz (JP Grayson and Tommy Grayson) (with Angel Orsini) defeated Effy and Joey Janela, and Jordan Oliver and Ryan O'Neill by pinfall	Three-way tag team match	10:19
2	Mia Friday defeated Ruthie Jay (c), Brittnie Brooks, and Jazmin Allure by pinfall	Four-way Winner Takes All match for the SPO and Hybrid Women's Championship	6:47
3	Face and BLK Out (JGeorge and Robby Illuminati) (with Skillz Da Great) vs. VNDL48 (Atticus Cogar, Otis Cogar, and Christian Napier) ended in a no contest	Six-man tag team match	10:00
4	Matt Tremont defeated Gangrel by pinfall	Singles match	4:06
5	Billy Gold, Kidd Legend, and LiveDanger (Danger Ross and LiveWire Charlie) defeated Channing Decker, Corazon, Juni Underwood, and Simon Gotch (with Amadeus) by pinfall	Eight-man tag team match	8:18
6	Deklan Grant (c) defeated Angel Metro, Angel Orsini, Tarzan Duran, Don Freeze, Jazmyne Hao, JJ Doze, and Mickie Knuckles by pinfall	Eight-way scramble match for the PWU Silver Skywalker Championship	7:56
7	1 Called Manders defeated Thomas Shire by pinfall	Singles match	6:38
8	Mercedes Martinez defeated Priscilla Kelly and Lacey Lane by pinfall	Three-way match for the vacant Women's Championship; Kiera Hogan served as the special guest referee.	7:03
9	Pat Dynamite (c) defeated Jack Evans by pinfall	Singles match for the PWU World Championship	10:30
(c) / – the champion(s) heading into the match
