= Pro Wrestling Unplugged =

American independent professional wrestling promotion

- Acronym: PWU
- Founded: 2004 in Philadelphia, Pennsylvania, United States
- Style: Professional wrestling
- Headquarters: Mount Holly, New Jersey, United States
- Founder: Johnny Kashmere
- Owner(s): Johnny Kashmere, Tommy Grayson, JP Grayson, Mitch Stein
- Formerly: PWU: Wrestle-Reality
- Website: pwunplugged.com

Pro Wrestling Unplugged (PWU), formerly PWU: Wrestle-Reality, is an American independent professional wrestling promotion located in Mount Holly, New Jersey owned by Johnny Kashmere, Tommy Grayson, JP Grayson, and Mitch Stein.

== History ==
On September 25, 2004, Pro Wrestling Unplugged held its first event titled Jam Sesson 1 at the Berwyn Tavern in Berwyn, Pennsylvania which featured Spanish Announce Team (Joel Maximo and Jose Maximo) fighting The Amazing Red and Trent Acid in the main event. The promotion held another Jam Session event at the Berwyn Tavern on October 23, 2004 which featured Ian Knoxx, Short Sleeve Sampson, and Trent Acid fighting against Greg Matthews and Rockin' Rebel in a three-on-two handicap match.

On June 13, 2006, during the Exit Sandman event at the New Alhambra Arena in Philadelphia, Pennsylvania, 2 Cold Scorpio won the PWU Heavyweight Championship after defeating Trent Acid.

On October 20, 2006, Pro Wrestlung Unplugged held the Pitbull/Public Enemy Memorial Cup, a memorial tournament held in honor of the deceased members of the The Pitbulls tag team consisting of Rocco Rock and Johnny Grunge. The Public Enemy tag team consisting of Rocco Rock and Johnny Grunge The winner of the tournament would be the team of All Money Is Legal (K-Murda and K-Pusha).

In late 2006, the company began a three-month cross-promotional rivalry with the Detroit-based promotion Juggalo Championship Wrestling (JCW) owned by the horrorcore hip-hop duo, the Insane Clown Posse which first started with their Vendetta event on November 18, 2006 at the New Alhambra Arena in Philadelphia, Pennsylvania but was extended into 2007. The partnership between the two promotions continued after the cross-promotional events when PWU co-owner Tod Gordon allowed for talent to be booked for JCW's Tempest Release Party Tour which would be taped for their weekly internet show SlamTV!. On the first night of the Tempest Release Party Tour, Tracy Smothers won the PWU Hardcore Championship after defeating Corporal Robinson and would defend the title throughout three nights of the tour against Zach Gowen and Nosawa.

On July 26, 2008, after holding a farwell show for Tod Gordon, PWU rebranded to PWU: WrestleReality with their first event under the new name being A Family Reunion which took place at Boyle's World Gym in Philadelphia, Pennsylvania. On September 26, 2009, PWU held their final show before closing its doors at Boyle's World Gym in Philadelphia, Pennsylvania with the main event being between Teddy Fine and Aramis for the PWU World Championship.

On September 20, 2025, PWU made its return with their Studio Session event at the Pro Wrestling Star Academy, operated by its sister promotion Super Powers of Wrestling, in Mount Holly, New Jersey. The main event of the show was a Falls count anywhere match between JP Grayson and Johnny Kashmere.

On April 15, 2026, PWU held a joint pay-per-view show with the recently-revived Hybrid Wrestling titled Hybrid x PWU Midnight Xpress at Horseshoe Las Vegas in Paradise, Nevada during Game Changer Wrestling's (GCW) Collective in which Mercedes Martinez won the vacant PWU Women's Championship in a three way match against Lacey Lane and Priscilla Kelly along with Mia Friday defeating SPO and Hybrid Women's champion Ruthie Jay, Brittnie Brooks, and Jazmin Allure in a four way match.

== Championships ==
=== Current ===
Championship	Current champion(s)	Date won	Days held	Event	Location	Notes
PWU Silver Skywalker Championship	“Flyin” Ryan O’Neil	August 14, 2026	4+	Jam Session #15: Where You Been	Mount Holly, New Jersey	
PWU Tag Team Championship	The Backseat Boyz (JP Grayson and Tommy Grayson)	May 29, 2026,	81+	SPO Live: Walk The Line	Mount Holly, New Jersey	
PWU Women's Championship	Mercedes Martinez	April 15, 2026	125+	Hybrid x PWU Midnight Xpress	Paradise, Nevada	
PWU World Championship	Pat Dynamite	April 10, 2026	130+	All Bets Are Off	Mount Holly, New Jersey	
