= Factory Town =

Concert venue

Coordinates: 25.8170°N 80.2580°W

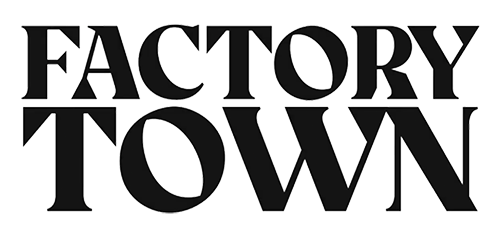
- Interactive map of Factory Town
- Address: 4800 NW 37th Avenue; Hialeah, Florida; United States
- Owner: Avra Jain
- Field size: 190,000-square-feet

Construction
- Built: 1946
- Opened: 2022

Website
- www.factorytown.com

Factory Town is a concert venue in Hialeah, Florida, a suburb of Miami, located in an old abandoned factory. The venue is operated by Link Miami Rebels, which also owns and operates the nearby Club Space.

== History ==
Factory Town is located in the formerly abandoned and Dixie Bedding mattress factory which was built in 1946 and employed 200 people at one time and primarily worked as a contractor to the United States Army to provide bedding for troops.

Avra Jain bought the site in order to make the youth of Hialeah, who had been moving out of the city in large numbers, interested in staying. She sought to provide a concert space in the greater Miami region and to be a competitor to Wynwood. Jain chose to retain most of the structural integrity of the factory for its industrial aesthetic but stripped away the roof to make the venue open air. A large kapok tree in the middle of the site was retained to create an ecological garden. Factory Town also has no master plan, allowing visiting acts to design the layout of the performance as they wish.

The venue would become part of the Leah Arts district, located between two Tri-Rail stations.

== Noise complaints ==
Shortly after its inception, the neighboring city of Miami Springs sued the venue for noise complaints. However, Hialeah's city government has voiced strong support for the venue. Miami Springs has described the venue and it's concerts as "nuisances" and "a significant annoyance" and claimed that there where 243 noise complaints claiming that residents "feared for their safety." Miami Springs demanded Factory Town “abate all noise entering the [city]”. However, since the venue is not located in Miami Springs, the city has instead sought legal action in Miami-Dade County courts. Jain claimed that she had never received any letter of complaint from Miami Springs, and first learned of their grievances when they filed suit against Factory Town. Hialeah's mayor Esteban “Steve” Bovo stated that he would address the concerns, but that he was also upset with neighboring municipalities "dictating what we can and can’t do in our city."

The lawsuit from Miami Springs was ultimately dismissed after Factory Town hired a sound engineer and put in place measures to reduce the noise. However, this has not stopped locals from complaining about the noise including those from Hialeah and Brownsville.
