= Devil's Night Creature Double Feature =

2024 Juggalo Championship Wrestling event and concert

- Promotional poster
- Promotion: Juggalo Championship Wrestling
- Date: October 30, 2024
- City: Detroit, Michigan
- Venue: Majestic Theatre

Juggalo Championship Wrestling event chronology
← Previous; Train of Terror Tour	Next → Hallowicked

The Devil's Night Creature Double Feature, also known as Devil's Night, was a professional wrestling and concert pay-per-view produced by Juggalo Championship Wrestling (JCW) and its parent company Psychopathic Records. The event took place on October 30, 2024 at the Majestic Theatre in Detroit, Michigan and was streamed live on Triller TV.

== Production ==
=== Background ===
On March 17, 2024, JCW announced the first tapings for their new show titled JCW Lunacy would take place on May 3, 2024 at the Newport Music Hall in Columbus, Ohio. Titled The Juggalos Strike Back, the show would feature various talent from the independent circuit, JCW's regular roster, All Elite Wrestling (AEW) talent, and talent from the National Wrestling Alliance (NWA). In addition to the premiere taping, JCW announced on May 20, 2024 that they would hold an additional taping at the Harpos Concert Theatre in Detroit, Michigan and would feature Matt Cardona and the debut of the Nu Backseat Boyz consisting of Tommy Grayson and JP Grayson with their manager Johnny Kashmere. On June 10, 2024, Juggalo Championship Wrestling announced that they would launch JCW Lunacy as a bi-weekly show and would feature talent from the National Wrestling Alliance (NWA), Major League Wrestling (MLW), Total Nonstop Action Wrestling (TNA), All Elite Wrestling (AEW), Lucha Libre AAA Worldwide (AAA), Big Japan Pro Wrestling (BJW), and the independent circuit alongside JCW's regular talent. However, the show's format would abruptly switch to a weekly format beginning on September 4, 2024.

In August 2024, Insane Clown Posse announced that they would be going on an eight-day tour titled the Train of Terror Tour which would build up to their annual Hallowicked concert in Detroit, Michigan.

On September 16, 2024, JCW announced their first pay-per-view event since 2024 titled the Devil's Night Creature Double Feature which would take place at the Majestic Theatre in Detroit, Michigan and would feature the Insane Clown Posse as the "Bitchin' Wild Bucks". On September 18, 2024, JCW announced that they would be part of a Train of Terror Tour which would consist of the Insane Clown Posse themselves, Wakko The Kidd, Monster Wolf, Ouija Macc, and Shaggy The Airhead and would lead up to the Insane Clown Posse's annual Halloween night event, Hallowicked at the Detroit Masonic Temple in Detroit, Michigan. On the October 16, 2024 episode of JCW Lunacy, the promotion showcased two matches from the Gathering of the Juggalos at Legend Valley in Thornville, Ohio. The first one being a battle royal with the winner being crowned the inaugural JCW American Championship which Caleb Konley had won and the main event of Bloodymania 17 which consisted of Willie Mack defending the JCW Heavyweight Championship against Matt Cross. The first night of the Train of Terror Tour which was streamed live on October 23, 2024 would see the debut of Pink Kane, a Kane parody played by Quinn Whittock who would later swap to Yellow Kane. On the final night of the Train of Terror Tour in Joliet, Illinois, the Backseat Boyz (Tommy Grayson and JP Grayson lost the JCW Tag Team Championship to Bang And Matthews (August Matthews and Davey Bang).

=== Storylines ===
The Devil's Night Creature Double Feature featured professional wrestling matches that involves different wrestlers from pre-existing scripted feuds and storylines. Wrestlers portrayed villains, heroes, or less distinguishable characters in scripted events that built tension and culminated in a wrestling match or series of matches. Storylines were produced on Juggalo Championship Wrestling's various events and their weekly streaming program JCW Lunacy.

== Results ==
Other on-screen personnel
Role:	Name:
Commentators	Joe Dombrowski
Commentators	Joe Galli
Commentators	Zac Amico
Ring announcer	The Ringmaster

No.	Results	Stipulations	Times
1	Breyer Wellington defeated Jake Crist by pinfall	Singles match	2:02
2	Kongo Kong defeated Luigi Primo by pinfall	Singles match	2:59
3	CoKane defeated Coach Mike, Facade, Simon Gotch, Tarzan Duran, and The Soultaker	Six way match	5:45
4	2 Tuff Tony and James Storm defeated The Southern Six (Alex Taylor and Silas Mason) by pinfall	Tag team match	4:56
5	Dani Mo defeated Heather Blue, Leela Hall, Mickie Knuckles, Pepper Pryde, Randi West, and Rikki Morris	Battle royal for the vacant JCW Women's Championship	4:45
6	Babathunder defeated Painful Paul	Singles match	4:57
7	The Backseat Boyz (JP Grayson and Tommy Grayson) defeated Bang And Matthews (August Matthews and Davey Bang) (c)	Tag team match for the JCW Tag Team Championship	7:31
8	Nic Nemeth defeated Kerry Morton	Singles match	14:59
9	Caleb Konley (c) defeated Matt Riddle	Singles match for the JCW American Championship	9:22
10	Willie Mack defeated Matt Cross (c) and Mecha Wolf (with Ricardo Rodriguez) by last eliminating Matt Cross	Three way elimination match for the JCW Heavyweight Championship	10:13
(c) / – the champion(s) heading into the match
