= Jannus Live =

Music venue in St. Petersburg, Florida

Coordinates: 27.771671°N 82.636063°W

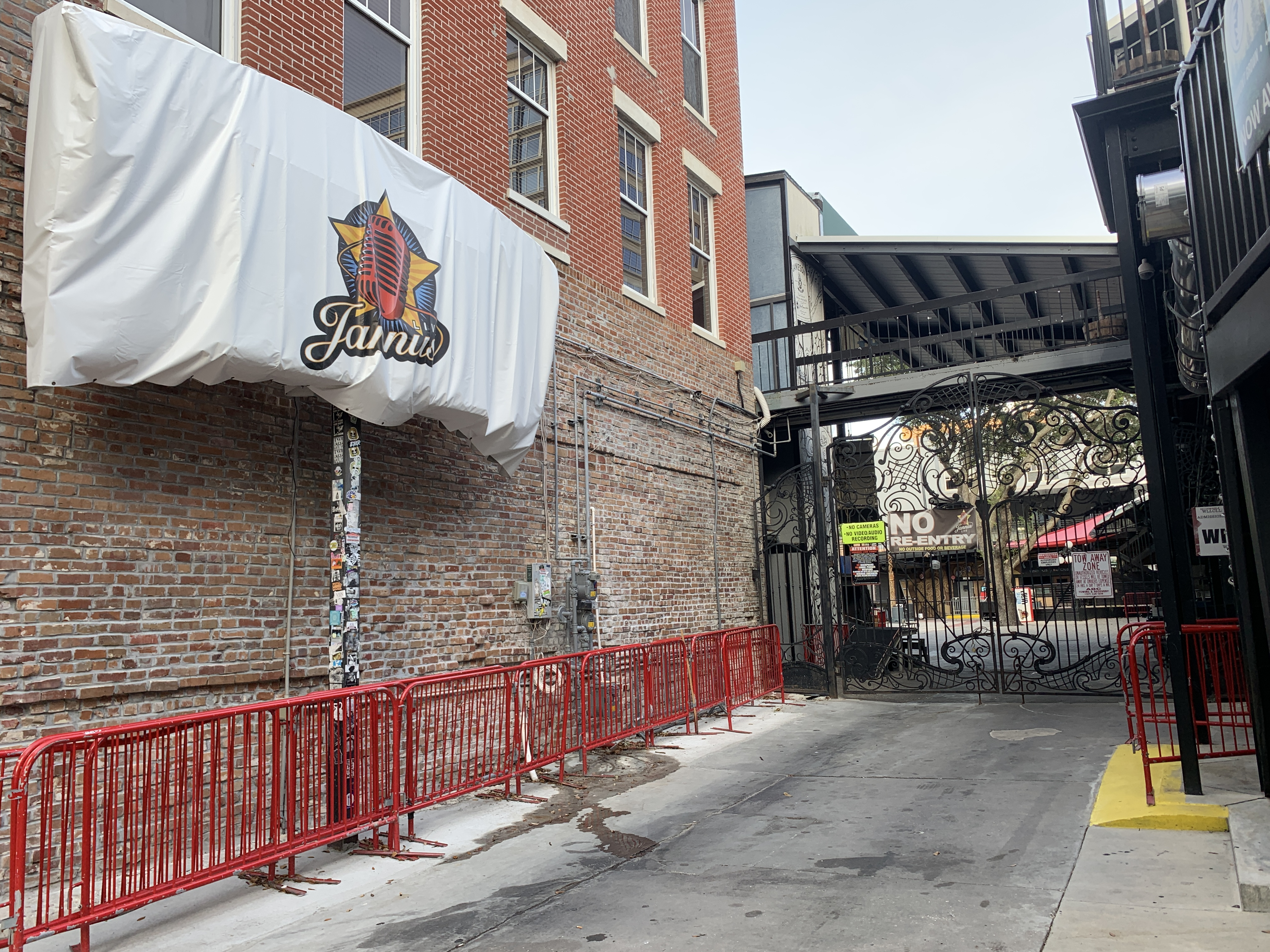
- Entrance to venue
- Interactive map of Jannus Live
- Former names: Jannus Landing (1984-2009)
- Address: 200 First Ave N STE 206; St. Petersburg, FL 33701
- Owner: Global Entertainment
- Capacity: 2,000
- Type: Outdoor

Construction
- Opened: 1984
- Renovated: 1999, 2009

Website
- www.jannuslive.com

Jannus Live (originally known as Jannus Landing) is an outdoor music venue in St. Petersburg, Florida. Located in the Downtown St. Petersburg Historic District, the courtyard venue has hosted numerous concerts for local and mainstream artists. The venue was founded in 1984 by Bob Barnes & Bill Pendergast & Gene Bryant and was named after pilot, Tony Jannus. In 2009, the venue was renovated and opened later in March 2010 under a new owner Jeff Knight "Jannus Live" and management. The venue is cited for hosting the most concerts in the Bay Area. In 2010, the venue was awarded "Best Small Concert Venue" and "Best Back in the Saddle" from the Creative Loafing Best of Bay Awards. This venue is known for having outdoor standing room only. No outside seating is permitted to enter the venue.

== History ==
The open-air music hall opened in 1984, as a means to attract reggae and punk rock shows to the Tampa Bay Area. Upon opening, the venue was exclusive to local bands. The site hosted its first mainstream act, Red Hot Chili Peppers in December 1987. The band returned in 1989, nearly causing the venue to close due to several fines for noise ordinance. Since then, the venue has become the spot for hosting mid-sized rock concerts. A part of the venue is a nightclub, Club Detroit. The club has a small balcony where concerts can be viewed. The venue also contains a nightclub separate from the concert area itself. It is known for its twin poles on stage and in the audience area, with a circus-tent-like tarp across the top. Davey Havok has been quoted in an interview with WSUN-FM that the pole in the audience is covered in a kind of goo, which is supposedly meant to keep fans from climbing the poles.

In 2009, owner Jack Bodziak was arrested by state agents in May on charges that he failed to pay more than $200,000 in sales tax on revenues from Jannus Landing. The music venue reopened in March 2010 under new operators Jeff Knight and Bill Edwards. Improvements include the addition of suites, a lounge and a koi pond, which has been added to the back deck.

== Notable performers ==
List of notable performers
- Less Than Jake
- Wallows
- I Dont Know How but They Found Me
- Bryan Adams
- The Black Keys
- Cannibal Corpse
- Red Hot Chili Peppers
- Jane's Addiction
- Green Day
- Pearl Jam
- Eminem
- Bad Religion
- King Sunny Adé
- Radiohead
- Marilyn Manson
- Wilco
- Lucinda Williams
- The Flaming Lips
- The Neville Brothers
- Snow Patrol
- Underoath
- Katy Perry
- Insane Clown Posse
- Mac Miller
- Chance The Rapper
- Rise Against
- Machine Gun Kelly
- Beastie Boys
- Nelly Furtado
- Cheap Trick
- Cyndi Lauper
- Declan McKenna
- Run the Jewels
- Lil Uzi Vert
- Sabaton
- Grace Potter
- Sabrina Carpenter
