= Train of Terror Tour =

2024 American concert and wrestling tour

- Tour by Insane Clown Posse, Ouija Macc, Shaggy The Airhead, Wakko The Kidd, Monster Wolf, Juggalo Championship Wrestling
- Promotional poster featuring the Insane Clown Posse, Ouija Macc, Shaggy The Airhead, Wakko The Kidd, and Monster Wolf
- Associated album: Various
- Start date: October 23, 2024
- End date: October 29, 2024
- Legs: 1
- No. of shows: 7

Train of Terror Tour
- Promotion: Juggalo Championship Wrestling
- Date: October 23–29, 2024

Juggalo Championship Wrestling event chronology
← Previous; Bloodymania 17	Next → Devil's Night

The Train of Terror Tour was a multi-day concert and professional wrestling tour produced by Psychopathic Records, a record label owned by the American horrorcore hip-hop duo, the Insane Clown Posse and their independent professional wrestling promotion Juggalo Championship Wrestling (JCW) and featured performances from the Insane Clown Posse themselves, Monster Wolf, Shaggy The Airhead, Ouija Macc, and Wakko The Kidd. The tour also featured livestreamed professional wrestling shows produced by JCW which were aired as live episodes of JCW Lunacy on YouTube, Facebook and Twitch.

== Production ==
=== Background ===
On March 17, 2024, JCW announced the first tapings for their new show titled JCW Lunacy would take place on May 3, 2024 at the Newport Music Hall in Columbus, Ohio. Titled The Juggalos Strike Back, the show would feature various talent from the independent circuit, JCW's regular roster, All Elite Wrestling (AEW) talent, and talent from the National Wrestling Alliance (NWA). In addition to the premiere taping, JCW announced on May 20, 2024 that they would hold an additional taping at the Harpos Concert Theatre in Detroit, Michigan and would feature Matt Cardona and the debut of the Nu Backseat Boyz consisting of Tommy Grayson and JP Grayson with their manager Johnny Kashmere. On June 10, 2024, Juggalo Championship Wrestling announced that they would launch JCW Lunacy as a bi-weekly show and would feature talent from the National Wrestling Alliance (NWA), Major League Wrestling (MLW), Total Nonstop Action Wrestling (TNA), All Elite Wrestling (AEW), Lucha Libre AAA Worldwide (AAA), Big Japan Pro Wrestling (BJW), and the independent circuit alongside JCW's regular talent. However, the show's format would abruptly switch to a weekly format beginning on September 4, 2024.

In August 2024, Insane Clown Posse announced that they would be going on an eight-day tour titled the "Train of Terror Tour" which would build up to their annual Hallowicked concert in Detroit, Michigan.

The first tapings featured Manny Fresh and NWA play-by-play commentator Joe Galli on commentary and premiered on August 28, 2024. On the September 18, 2024 episode of JCW Lunacy, the Southern Six consisting of Kerry Morton and James Storm won the JCW Tag Team Championship after defeating the Brothers of Funstruction consisting of Yabo The Clown and Ruffo The Clown. On September 16, 2024, JCW announced their first pay-per-view event since 2024 titled the Devil's Night which would take place at the Majestic Theatre in Detroit, Michigan and would feature the Insane Clown Posse as the "Bitchin' Wild Bucks". On September 18, 2024, JCW announced that they would be part of a Train of Terror Tour which would consist of the Insane Clown Posse themselves, Wakko The Kidd, Monster Wolf, Ouija Macc, and Shaggy The Airhead and would lead up to the Insane Clown Posse's annual Halloween night event, Hallowicked at the Detroit Masonic Temple in Detroit, Michigan. On the October 16, 2024 episode of JCW Lunacy, the promotion would showcase two matches from the 2024 Gathering of the Juggalos at Legend Valley in Thornville, Ohio. The first one being a battle royal with the winner being crowned the inaugural JCW American Championship which Caleb Konley had won and the main event of Bloodymania 17 which consisted of Willie Mack defending the JCW Heavyweight Championship against Matt Cross.

=== Professional wrestling Storylines ===
The Train of Terror Tour featured professional wrestling matches that involves different wrestlers from pre-existing scripted feuds and storylines. Wrestlers portrayed villains, heroes, or less distinguishable characters in scripted events that built tension and culminated in a wrestling match or series of matches. Storylines were produced on Juggalo Championship Wrestling's various events and their weekly streaming program JCW Lunacy.

== Professional wrestling results ==
Other on-screen personnel
Role:	Name:
Commentators	Joe Dombrowski
Commentators	Zac Amico
Ring announcer	The Ringmaster

Night 1 - October 23, 2024
No.	Results	Stipulations	Times
1	The Neon Blondes (Dani Mo and Facade) defeated Mickie Knuckles and Super Beast (with Crystal White) by pinfall	Tag team match	7:42
2	Pink Kane defeated Chef Mike by pinfall	Singles match	1:57
3	The Backseat Boyz (JP Grayson and Tommy Grayson) (with Johnny Kashmere) (c) defeated Bang And Matthews (August Matthews and Davey Bang)	Tag team match for the JCW Tag Team Championship	7:13
4	James Storm defeated Simon Gotch by pinfall	Singles match	4:56
5	Babathunder defeated August Matthews, Breyer Wellington, Chef Mike, Dani Mo, Davey Bang, Facade, JP Grayson, Kongo Kong, Painful Paul, Pink Kane, Super Beast, and Tommy Grayson by last eliminating Kongo Kong	Battle royal	3:06
6	The Southern Six (Alex Taylor, Kerry Morton, and Silas Mason) defeated 2 Tuff Tony, Ricky Morton, and Tarzan Duran	Six-man tag team match	12:12
(c) / – the champion(s) heading into the match

Night 2 - October 24, 2024
No.	Results	Stipulations	Times
1	Bang And Matthews (August Matthews and Davey Bang) defeated Breyer Wellington and Jeeves by pinfall	Tag team match	4:13
2	Painful Paul defeated Baywatch Mike and Pink Kane by pinfall	Three way match	1:01
3	Mickie Knuckles defeated Dani Mo by pinfall	Singles match	5:31
4	2 Tuff Tony and The Backseat Boyz (JP Grayson and Tommy Grayson) defeated The Southern Six (Alex Taylor, Kerry Morton, and Silas Mason) by pinfall	Six-man tag team match	8:40
5	Babathunder defeated Alex Taylor, August Matthews, Baywatch Mike, Breyer Wellington, Dani Mo, Davey Bang, Jeeves, Kerry Morton, and Pink Kane	Battle royal	2:48
6	Kongo Kong defeated Facade, Simon Gotch, and Tarzan Duran	Four way match	4:52
7	Willie Mack defeated Super Beast	Singles match	1:06
8	Matt Cross (c) defeated James Storm by disqualification	Singles match for the JCW Heavyweight Championship	8:23
(c) / – the champion(s) heading into the match

Night 3 - October 25, 2024
No.	Results	Stipulations	Times
1	Simon Gotch defeated Bumfight Mike by pinfall	Singles match	2:05
2	The Backseat Boyz (JP Grayson and Tommy Grayson) (c) defeated Bang And Matthews (August Matthews and Davey Bang) by pinfall	Tag team match for the JCW Tag Team Championship	8:00
3	Breyer Wellington defeated Pink Kane by pinfall	Singles match	1:45
4	The Southern Six (Alex Taylor, Kerry Morton, and Silas Mason) defeated 2 Tuff Tony and The Neon Blondes (Dani Mo and Facade) by pinfall	Six-man tag team match	8:40
5	Babathunder defeated Alex Taylor, Bumfight Mike, Dani Mo, Facade, Jeeves, JP Grayson, Kerry Morton, Mickie Knuckles, Pink Kane, and Tommy Grayson by last eliminating Mickie Knuckles	Battle royal	9:26
6	Matt Cross and Willie Mack defeated Kongo Kong and Mecha Wolf	Tag team match	11:50
(c) / – the champion(s) heading into the match

Night 4 - October 26, 2024
No.	Results	Stipulations	Times
1	The Backseat Boyz (JP Grayson and Tommy Grayson) (c) defeated Bang And Matthews (August Matthews and Davey Bang) by pinfall	Tag team match for the JCW Tag Team Championship	1:20
2	Luigi Primo defeated Simon Gotch by pinfall	Singles match	4:32
3	Mickie Knuckles defeated Tarzan Duran by pinfall	Singles match	6:14
4	Babathunder defeated Yellow Kane by pinfall	Singles match	2:19
5	Mecha Wolf defeated August Matthews, Davey Bang, JP Grayson, Like Mike, Luigi Primo, Simon Gotch, Tommy Grayson, and Yellow Kane by last eliminating Like Mike	Battle royal	7:27
6	Matt Cross (c) defeated Kongo Kong	Singles match for the JCW Heavyweight Championship	—
(c) / – the champion(s) heading into the match

Night 5 - October 27, 2024
No.	Results	Stipulations	Times
1	Mecha Wolf defeated Yellow Kane by pinfall	Singles match	2:03
2	Kongo Kong defeated Tarzan Duran by pinfall	Singles match	3:05
3	The Backseat Boyz (JP Grayson and Tommy Grayson) (c) defeated The New Guys (Jake Bosche and Scott Stanley) by pinfall	Tag team match for the JCW Tag Team Championship	6:17
4	Painful Paul defeated Simon Gotch by pinfall	Singles match	3:36
5	Mickie Knuckles defeated Sportscaster Mike by pinfall	Singles match	0:38
6	Bang And Matthews (August Matthews and Davey Bang) defeated Babathunder, Simon Gotch and Yellow Kane, The Backseat Boyz (JP Grayson and Tommy Grayson), and The New Guys (Jake Bosche and Scott Stanley)	Tag team battle royal	6:12
7	The Southern Six (Alex Taylor, Kerry Morton, and Silas Mason) defeated 2 Tuff Tony, Luigi Primo, and Willie Mack	Six-man tag team match	12:08
8	Matt Cross (c) defeated Breyer Wellington (w/Jeeves)	Singles match for the JCW Heavyweight Championship	3:04
(c) / – the champion(s) heading into the match

Night 6 - October 28, 2024
No.	Results	Stipulations	Times
1	The Neon Blondes (Dani Mo and Facade) defeated Bang And Matthews (August Matthews and Davey Bang) by pinfall	Tag team match	7:01
2	Caleb Konley (c) defeated Mecha Wolf and Tarzan Duran by pinfall	Singles match for the JCW American Championship	6:10
3	Babathunder defeated Breyer Wellington by pinfall	Singles match	2:07
4	Mike The Nurse defeated Mickie Knuckles by pinfall	Singles match	7:15
5	Officer Colt Cabana defeated Luigi Primo	Singles match	4:45
6	Swoggle defeated Painful Paul, August Matthews, Dani Mo, Davey Bang, Facade, Jeeves, Kongo Kong, and Yellow Kane by last eliminating Painful Paul	Battle royal	3:11
7	2 Tuff Tony and The Backseat Boyz (JP Grayson and Tommy Grayson) defeated The Southern Six (Alex Taylor, Kerry Morton, and Silas Mason)	Six-man tag team match	10:31
8	Matt Cross (c) defeated Simon Gotch	Singles match for the JCW Heavyweight Championship	3:39
(c) / – the champion(s) heading into the match

Night 7 - October 29, 2024
No.	Results	Stipulations	Times
1	The Neon Blondes (Dani Mo and Facade) defeated Breyer Wellington and Jeeves by pinfall	Tag team match	7:13
2	Kongo Kong defeated Mickie Knuckles by pinfall	Singles match	2:24
3	Babathunder defeated Breyer Wellington by pinfall	Tag team match for the JCW Tag Team Championship	6:04
4	The Southern Six (Alex Taylor, Kerry Morton, and Silas Mason) defeated Mike The Builder, Tarzan Duran, and Yellow Kane by pinfall	Six-man tag team match	6:04
5	Mecha Wolf defeated 2 Tuff Tony	Singles match	4:20
6	Bang And Matthews (August Matthews and Davey Bang) defeated The Backseat Boyz (JP Grayson and Tommy Grayson) (c)	Tag team match for the JCW Tag Team Championship	5:22
7	Painful Paul defeated Dani Mo, Facade, Jeeves, Mickie Knuckles, Mike The Builder, Simon Gotch, Tarzan Duran, and Yellow Kane by last eliminating Facade	Battle royal	3:00
8	Matt Cross (c) vs. Babathunder ended in a no contest	Singles match for the JCW Heavyweight Championship	2:53
(c) / – the champion(s) heading into the match

== Performers ==
- Insane Clown Posse
- Ouija Macc
- Shaggy The Airhead
- Wakko The Kidd
- Monster Wolf

== Tour dates ==
Date	City	State	Venue
October 23, 2024	Nashville	Tennessee	Brooklyn Bowl
October 24, 2024	Birmingham	Alabama	Iron City
October 25, 2024	Little Rock	Arkansas	Little Rock Hall
October 26, 2024	Columbia	Missouri	The Blue Note
October 27, 2024	St. Louis	Missouri	The Hawthorn
October 28, 2024	Milwaukee	Wisconsin	The Rave/Eagles Club
October 29, 2024	Joilet	Illinois	The Forge
