= Luigi Primo (wrestler) =

American professional wrestler

Personal information
- Born: Chris Monica; September 10, 1982 (age 44) California, U.S.

Professional wrestling career
- Ring names: Luigi Primo; Chris Monica
- Billed height: 5 ft 10 in (178 cm)
- Billed weight: 176 lb (80 kg)
- Trained by: Jay Serious
- Debut: 2014

Chris Monica, better known by his ring name Luigi Primo is an American professional wrestler who is best known for his work in the independent circuit. Particularly with Juggalo Championship Wrestling (JCW). He has also made appearances in-ring and backstage in All Elite Wrestling (AEW), Maple Leaf Pro Wrestling (MLP), The Crash Lucha Libre, Gleat, WrestleCade, Impact Wrestling, and Boca Raton Championship Wrestling (BRCW).

== Professional wrestling career ==
=== Independent circuit (2018–present) ===
On July 13, 2018, Luigi Primo made his professional wrestling debut at Heavy Metal Wrestling's (HMW) Screaming for Vengeance event when he fought Terrale Tempo. Primo also competed in a battle royal for the HMW Bexar Knuckles Championship during the promotion's You're Never Too Young To Die event on September 28, 2018. On July 19, 2019, Primo won his first championship when he won the RCW International Championship at an unspecified River City Wrestling event. On January 10, 2020, during a dark match at Bash at the Brewery 2, a cross-promotional livestreaming event co-produced by Impact Wrestling and River City Wrestling, Primo won the RCW International Championship for the second time after defeating defending Champion Anthony Andrews, Alberto Del Frito, and Randy Price in a four-way match. However, Primo only held the belt for one day before being defeated by Andrews at Impact Wrestling's Arlington Brawl on January 11, 2020. In 2022, Primo had gone viral after Wrestling With Unicorns had posted a clip of one of his wrestling matches. By early September, Sports Illustrated published an article on him. On September 12, 2022, Luigi Primo was interviewed on Fox News' Jesse Watters Primetime program.

On November 26, 2022, Primo competed in a 26-man battle royal at the WrestleCade convention in Winston-Salem, North Carolina which featured Nick Aldis, Brian Pillman Jr., and Shane Douglas. On December 17, 2022, Primo joined the Full Blooded Italians when he teamed up with Little Guido to take on The New Breed Extreme consisting of Afa Jr. and Beastman at Battleground Championship Wrestling's (BCW) A Tribute to the Extreme in Philadelphia.

=== All Elite Wrestling (2022) ===
On September 14, 2022, Luigi Primo made his All Elite Wrestling (AEW) debut during a backstage segment in which he was interviewed by Alex Marvez. During an interview with SiriusXM's Busted Open on Fight Nation, Primo had said that he would want to have a match with Ethan Page.

=== International promotions (2022–present) ===
On October 27, 2022, Luigi Primo made his international wrestling debut when he fought against Tony Baroni at Nation Extreme Wrestling's (NEW) NEW 10 event in Vancouver, British Columbia, Canada. On December 30, 2022, Primo made his Japanese wrestling debut during GLEAT Ver.4 in Tokyo when he fought Cima. On January 8, 2023, Primo fought against Kaz Hayashi during GLEAT Ver.5 in Osaka. On January 10, 2026, Luigi Primo made his return to Japan when he fought Takehiro Yamamura at GLEAT Ver.22 in Osaka. On May 15, 2026, Primo made his Mexican wrestling debut during a Crash Lucha Libre show in Tijuana. On July 2, 2026, Primo made his Lucha Libre AAA debut during a house show in La Paz, Baja California Sur. On June 12, 2026, Primo made his Maple Leaf Pro Wrestling debut during an Ignition match which was taped during television tapings for Mayhem. On the August 5, 2026 episode of MLP Mayhem, Primo made his television debut for MLP in a match against Michael Allen Richard Clark.

=== Juggalo Championship Wrestling (2024–present) ===
On October 26, 2024, Luigi Primo made his Juggalo Championship Wrestling (JCW) debut during the promotion's Train of Terror Tour in Columbia, Missouri where he defeated Simon Gotch in his debut match before competing in a battle royal which featured Mecha Wolf, JP and Tommy Grayson, Simon Gotch and Yellow Kane. Primo competed throughout the rest of the tour, fighting against the Southern Six consisting of Kerry Morton, Alex Taylor, and Silas Mason in a six-man tag team match in which he teamed up with Willie Mack and 2 Tuff Tony, Officer Colt Cabana, and Caleb Konley, Cabana, and Mack in a four-way match for the JCW American Championship. On October 30, 2024, Primo fought against Kongo Kong during the Devil's Night pay-per-view in Detroit.

== Championships and accomplishments ==
- River City Wrestling
  - RCW International Championship (2 times)
- Inspire Pro Wrestling
  - Inspire Pro Championship
- Party World Rasslin'
  - PWR Partyweight Championship
- Circle 6
  - Circle 6 World Championship
