= Johnny Kashmere =

American professional wrestler

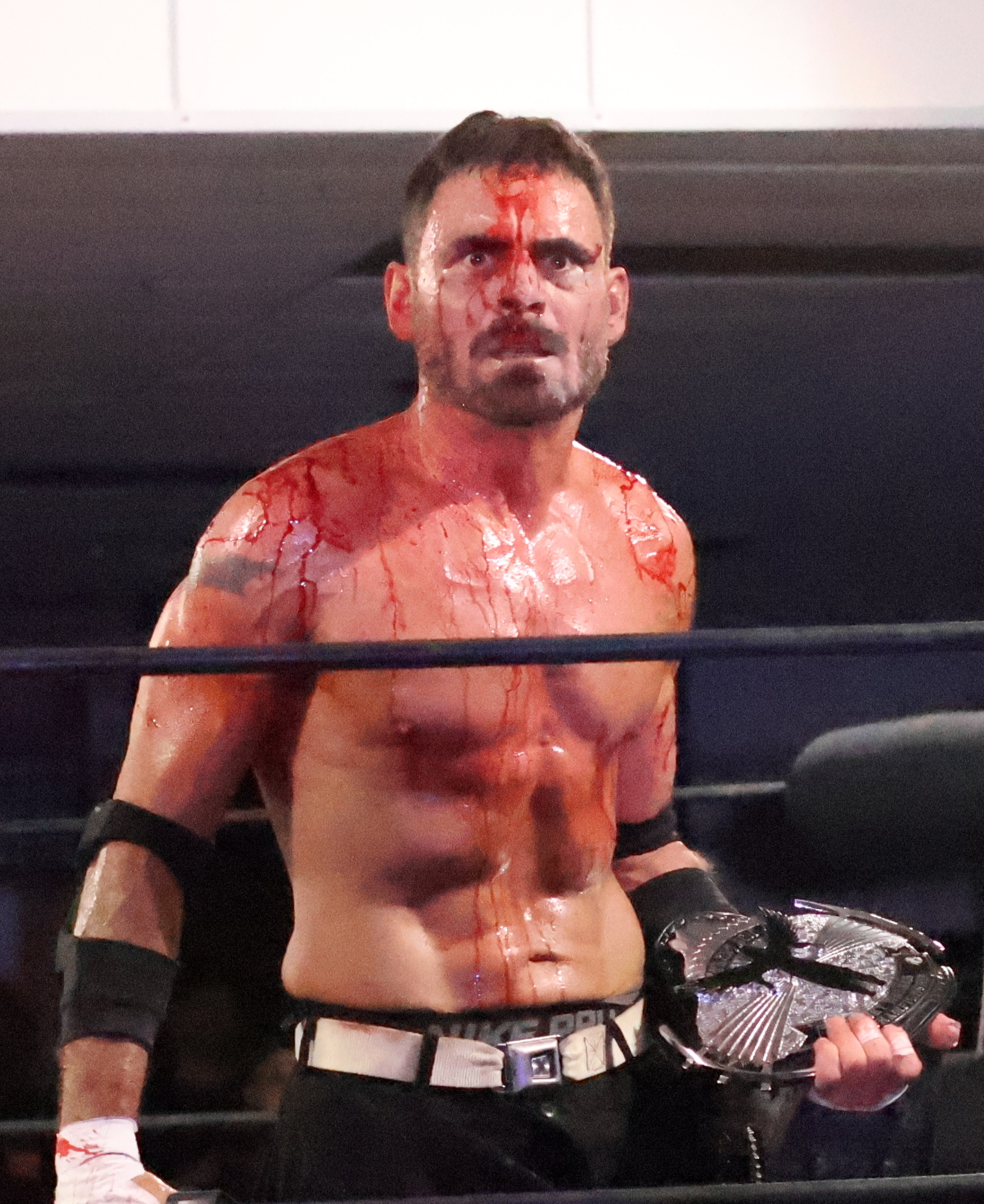
- Kashmere in July 2024

Personal information
- Born: John Kashmer; November 6, 1978 (age 47) Burlington, New Jersey, United States

Professional wrestling career
- Ring name: Johnny Kashmere
- Billed height: 6 ft 0 in (183 cm)
- Billed weight: 192 lb (87 kg)
- Trained by: Pitbull #1; Pitbull #2
- Debut: 1998

John Kashmer (born November 6, 1978), better known by the ring name Johnny Kashmere, is an American professional wrestler. Kashmere has competed in Ring of Honor, Combat Zone Wrestling, Assault Championship Wrestling, and NWA New Jersey, and in Japan, Central America, Europe and Alaska. For much of his early career, he wrestled as one-half of The Backseat Boyz alongside Trent Acid.

Kashmere currently promotes and co-owns Super Powers of Wrestling (SPO) and its sister promotion Pro Wrestling Unplugged (PWU). He also manages the new BackSeat Boyz (2023) tag-team of Brothers JP Grayson and Tommy Grayson.

== Professional wrestling career ==
In the late-1990s, Kashmere joined the GWA Animal House, where he was being trained by The Pitbulls, Pitbull #1, and Pitbull #2. After graduating, Kashmere joined the CZW main roster and started teaming with Trent Acid as The Backseat Boyz, a play on the American vocal group, The Backstreet Boys. Together they would go on to win multiple tag team championships on the independent scene, including three reigns with the CZW World Tag Team Championship, and one reign with the ROH World Tag Team Championship. Kashmere has also once also held the CZW World Tag Team championship with Robbie Mireno, and once with Justice Pain.

The Backseat Boyz were put together by NWA New Jersey writer Don "Donnie B." Bucci, the twin brother of Extreme Championship Wrestling original Mike "Nova" Bucci. Donnie B. also became their manager on the road and in NWA. Under Donnie's tutelage, Acid and Kashmere were hired by ECW to start in April, but ECW went out of business in February so they never debuted on ECW on TNN.

After leaving Ring of Honor and CZW in 2004, Kashmere began promoting Pro Wrestling Unplugged in Philadelphia and successfully ran over a hundred events in the Philly area. Many of those events were at the former ECW arena in Philadelphia.

When in June 2010, his longtime tag team partner Trent Acid died, Kashmere organized a tribute show in his honor. A month later, on July 10, 2010, Kashmere ran "Acid-Fest: A Tribute to Trent Acid" at the former ECW Arena as a benefit event to assist in paying for Trent's burial services. In the main event, Kashmere (with Matt Walsh and Donnie B.) defeated Devon Moore (with Annie Social) in a singles match.

== Personal life ==
In 2001, Kashmere dropped out of Philadelphia University to begin his Japan Tours for Big Japan Pro Wrestling. In Japan, Kashmere was featured in multiple issues of Baseball Magazine's national wrestling publications and was a special guest on a nationally televised talk show.

In July 2010, Kashmere retired from professional wrestling following his last match at The Acid Fest and returned to college to pursue a computer science degree. Today Kashmere is graduating with two degrees and beginning his career in the IT field and working on his post grad degrees. He plans on running events in the future, once school is behind him.

Kashmere has appeared on WWE Monday Night Raw, MTV, WWE Sunday Night Heat, Japan's Samurai TV, TNA Pay-Per-View, and many Philadelphia area local news segments.

Kashmere was nationally ranked in Pro Wrestling Magazine's Top 500 wrestlers in the world nine out of the 13 years that he competed in the ring.

== Championships and accomplishments ==
- Pro Wrestling Illustrated
  - PWI ranked him #319 of the top 500 singles wrestlers in the PWI 500 in 2010
- Ring of Honor
  - ROH World Tag Team Championship (1 time) – with Trent Acid
