= Harpos Concert Theatre =

Music venue in Detroit, Michigan, US

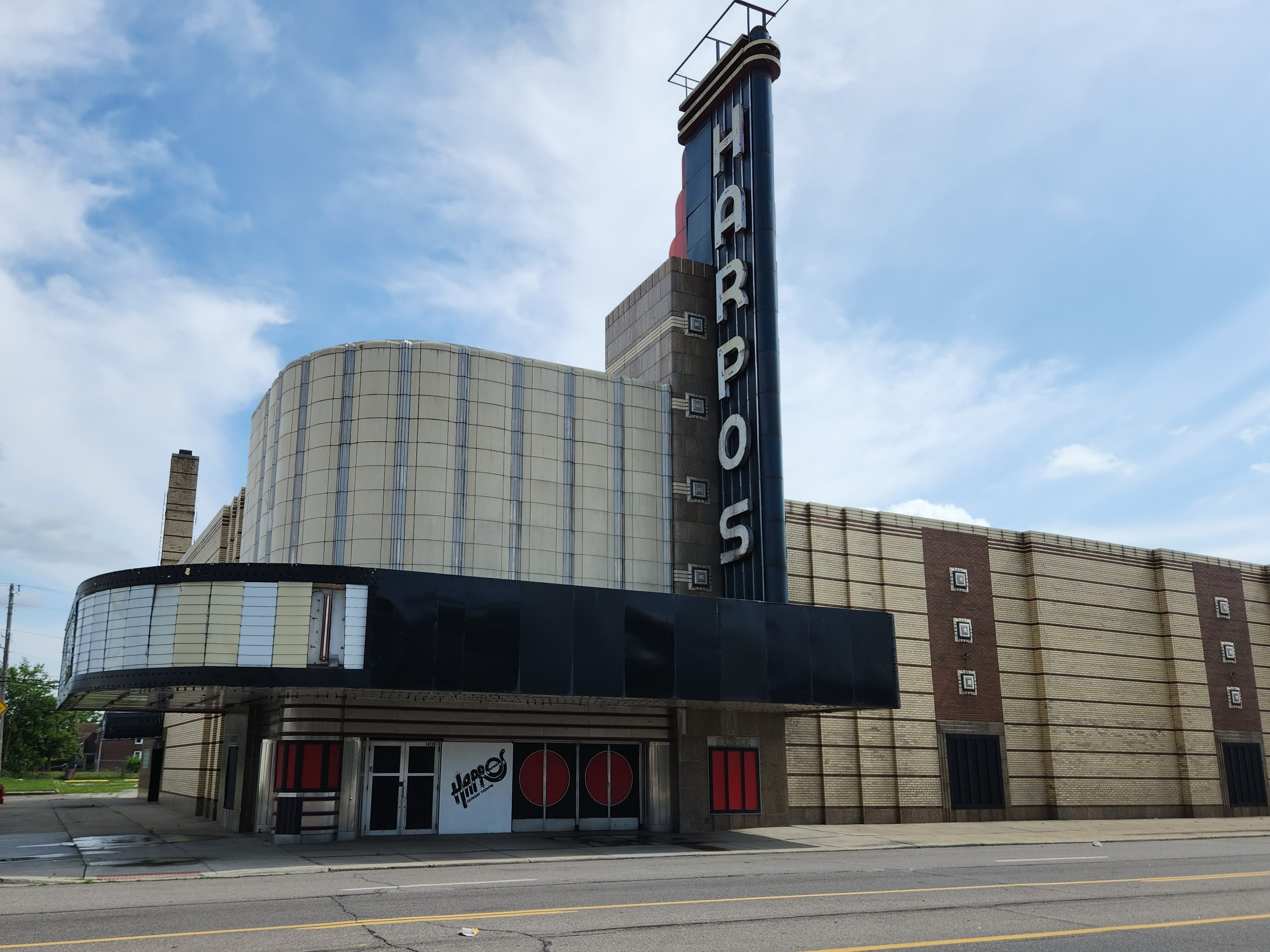
- Interactive map of Harpos Concert Theatre
- Former names: Harper Theatre (1939-1976)
- Address: 14238 Harper Ave; Detroit, Michigan; United States
- Coordinates: 42.4039°N 82.9662°W
- Owner: Krystle Dzajkovska, Ruzvelt Stevanovski
- Capacity: 2,500

Construction
- Opened: 1939

Website
- harposlive.com

Harpos Concert Theatre is a music venue located at 14238 Harper Avenue, Detroit, Michigan, United States. It is known as a venue for heavy metal and industrial rock.

== History ==
Harpos was built in 1939 as the Harper Theatre, an Art Moderne-styled movie theater operated by the Wisper-Westman circuit. Charles N. Agree, the architect of the earlier Grande and Vanity Ballrooms, designed the theatre. Contemporaries of the Harper Theatre included the Westown (1936), the Royal (1940), and the Dearborn (1941), all designed by Agree in similar style for the same company.

The Harper Theatre opened on December 1, 1939, with showings of The Rains Came and Chicken Wagon Family. An advertisement in the Detroit Free Press advertised free parking, seating for 2000 in "streamlined seats," and accessibility features for hard-of-hearing guests.

Around 1976, the Harper was converted to a disco club, and renamed Harpo's. The 80-foot (24 m) "HARPOS" marquee was modified from the original Harper marquee, along with a major interior renovation. At its reopening, Harpo's played rock-n-roll and disco, but quickly switched to metal under new ownership in 1979.

Harpos has also been a stop for many professional wrestling shows since 2022 with its first show being Game Changer Wrestling's (GCW) Most Notorious pay-per-view on January 14, 2022 and was broadcast live on FITE TV. On June 22, 2024, Juggalo Championship Wrestling held a series of tapings for their weekly internet show Lunacy.

== Recordings ==
Gary Moore performed at Harpos on June 23, 1984, during his Victims of the Future tour. Four songs of the live album We Want Moore! were recorded that evening and were released the same year.

Warrant recorded their live CD "Warrant Live 86-97" at Harpos on November 22, 1996.

Heavy metal band Corrosion of Conformity filmed their live DVD Live Volume at Harpos on April 20, 2001.

Black Label Society filmed their live DVD Boozed, Broozed & Broken-Boned at Harpos on September 14, 2002; notably, during the recording of that show, the bar ran out of alcohol.
