= 2026 in professional wrestling =

2026 in professional wrestling describes the current year's events in the world of professional wrestling.

== List of promotions ==
These promotions are holding events throughout 2026.

Promotion name	Abbreviation	Notes
AAW Wrestling	AAW	The "AAW" abbreviation has been used since 2007 and previously stood for the promotion's original name, All American Wrestling.
All Elite Wrestling	AEW	
All Japan Pro Wrestling	AJPW	
Combat Zone Wrestling	CZW	
Consejo Mundial de Lucha Libre	CMLL	
CyberFight	CF	CyberFight is an umbrella brand that oversees and promotes three individual promotions: DDT Pro-Wrestling (DDT), Pro Wrestling Noah (Noah), and Tokyo Joshi Pro Wrestling (TJPW).
Deadlock Pro-Wrestling	DPW	
DEFY Wrestling	DEFY	
Dragongate	DG	
Dream Star Fighting Marigold	Marigold	
Game Changer Wrestling	GCW	
German Wrestling Federation	GWF	
House of Glory	HOG	
Juggalo Championship Wrestling	JCW	
Lucha Libre AAA Worldwide	AAA	The "AAA" abbreviation has been used since the mid-1990s and had previously stood for the promotion's original name Asistencia Asesoría y Administración. Owned by WWE since April 2025.
Major League Wrestling	MLW	
Maple Leaf Pro Wrestling	MLP	Relaunch of the former Maple Leaf Wrestling, acquired by Scott D'Amore.
National Wrestling Alliance	NWA	
New Japan Pro-Wrestling	NJPW	
Progress Wrestling	PROGRESS	
Pro Wrestling Zero1	Zero1	
Revolution Pro Wrestling	RevPro	
Ring of Honor	ROH	
Total Nonstop Action Wrestling	TNA	
Westside Xtreme Wrestling	wXw	
Women of Wrestling	WOW	
World Wonder Ring Stardom	Stardom	
WWE	—	"WWE" stands for World Wrestling Entertainment, which remains the company's legal name, though the company ceased using the full name in April 2011, with the WWE abbreviation becoming an orphaned initialism. WWE divides its roster into four storyline divisions – referred to as brands where wrestlers exclusively perform on their respective weekly television programs. Raw and SmackDown are their two main brands, while NXT and Evolve serve as their developmental territories. WWE ID is another developmental program for wrestlers on the independent circuit.

== Calendar of notable shows ==
=== January ===
Date	Promotion(s)	Event	Location	Venue	Main event	Notes
1	CF: Noah	The New Year	Tokyo, Japan	Nippon Budokan	Yoshiki Inamura (c) defeated Ozawa to retain the GHC Heavyweight Championship	
2	CMLL	Sin Salida	Cuauhtémoc, Mexico City, Mexico	Arena México	Robin lost his mask in a 16-way Steel Cage match against Astral, Blue Shark, Calavera Jr. I, Calavera Jr. II, Cancerbero, Diamond, El Coyote, El Vigia, Electrico, Espíritu Negro, Oro Jr., Pólvora, Rey Cometa, Sangre Imperial, and Virus	
3	Marigold	First Dream	Tokyo, Japan	Ota City General Gymnasium	Miku Aono (c) defeated Mai Sakurai to retain the Marigold World Championship	
3	GCW	One Night Only	Berwyn, Illinois	Berwyn Eagles Club	Matt Tremont and Dysfunction defeated VNDL48 (Otis Cogar and Christian Napier) in a Deathmatch	
3	Stardom	New Year Dream	Tokyo, Japan	Shinjuku Face	02line (AZM and Miyu Amasaki) defeated FWC (Hazuki and Koguma) and T-Hearts (Sareee and Miku Kanae) to become the #1 contenders to the Goddesses of Stardom Championship	
3	Stardom	New Year Dream	Tokyo, Japan	Shinjuku Face	God's Eye (Lady C, Tomoka Inaba, and Hina) defeated Cosmic Angels (Yuna Mizumori, Aya Sakura and Sayaka Kurara)	
4	NJPW	Wrestle Kingdom 20	Tokyo, Japan	Tokyo Dome	Kazuchika Okada defeated Hiroshi Tanahashi	Featured Hiroshi Tanahashi's retirement match, the professional wrestling debut of former judoka Olympic gold medalist Aaron Wolf, and the NJPW returns of Andrade El Ídolo, Jake Lee, Francesco Akira, Jay White, Will Ospreay, Kenny Omega, Kota Ibushi, Katsuyori Shibata, Keiji Mutoh, Tatsumi Fujinami, Tetsuya Naito, and Bushi.
5	NJPW	New Year Dash!!	Tokyo, Japan	Nippon Budokan	Knock Out Brothers (Oskar and Yuto-Ice) (c) defeated TMDK (Zack Sabre Jr. and Ryohei Oiwa) to retain the IWGP Tag Team Championship	
5	WWE: Raw	Raw on Netflix Anniversary Show	Brooklyn, New York	Barclays Center	CM Punk (c) defeated Bron Breakker to retain the World Heavyweight Championship	Celebration of the 1 year anniversary of Raw's premiere on Netflix.
6	WWE: NXT	New Year's Evil	Orlando, Florida	WWE Performance Center	Oba Femi (c) defeated Leon Slater to retain the NXT Championship	Aired as a special episode of NXT.
11	CF: Noah	Legacy Rise; Night 1	Tokyo, Japan	Korakuen Hall	Yoshiki Inamura (c) defeated Masa Kitamiya to retain the GHC Heavyweight Championship	
14	AEW	Maximum Carnage	Phoenix, Arizona	Arizona Financial Theatre	MJF (c) defeated Bandido to retain the AEW World Championship	Aired as a special episode of Dynamite.
14	AEW	Maximum Carnage	Phoenix, Arizona	Arizona Financial Theatre	Jet Set Rodeo ("Hangman" Adam Page, Mike Bailey and Kevin Knight) defeated The Opps (Samoa Joe, Powerhouse Hobbs, and Katsuyori Shibata) (c) to win the AEW World Trios Championship	Aired on tape delay on January 17 as a special episode of Collision. Featured the final AEW match of Powerhouse Hobbs.
15	TNA	Thursday Night Impact! premiere on AMC	Garland, Texas	Curtis Culwell Center	Mike Santana defeated Frankie Kazarian (c) to win the TNA World Championship	First episode of Impact! on AMC Network and AMC+. Featured the TNA debut of Daria Rae and the TNA returns of Dixie Carter and Elayna Black.
17	TNA	Genesis	Garland, Texas	Curtis Culwell Center	Mike Santana (c) defeated Frankie Kazarian in a Texas Deathmatch with Nic Nemeth as the special guest referee to retain the TNA World Championship	Featured JDC's retirement match.
17	GCW	Code of the Streets	Dallas, Texas	Gilley's Dallas	Otis Cogar defeated Matt Tremont (c) in a Deathmatch to win the GCW Ultraviolent Championship	
17	JCW	Carnival of Chaos Tour	Summit Music Hall	Denver, Colorado	Luciano Family Enterprises (Mickie Knuckles and PCO) defeated Brothers of Funstruction (Ruffo the Clown and Yabo the Clown) in a Funhouse Rules match	
18	JCW	Carnival of Chaos Tour	Sunshine Theater	Albuquerque, New Mexico	Luciano Family Enterprises (Mickie Knuckles and PCO) defeated St. Claire Monster Corporation (Kongo Kong and Mr. Happy)	
18	GCW	Crime Wave	Wichita, Kansas	Wave	Atticus Cogar (c) defeated Priscilla Kelly to retain the GCW World Championship	
18	NJPW	Yuji Nagata Produce Blue Justice XVII ~ Aoyi Transition ~	Sakura, Japan	Sakura Civic Gymnasium	Yuji Nagata, Aaron Wolf, Toru Yano, and Boltin Oleg defeated House of Torture (Evil, Ren Narita, Yujiro Takahashi, and Dick Togo)	
24	Marigold	New Year's Golden Garden	Tokyo, Japan	Korakuen Hall	Mayu Iwatani (c) defeated Utami Hayashishita to retain the GHC Women's Championship	Featured Mayu Iwatani's 15th debut anniversary
24	WWE: Raw; SmackDown	Saturday Night's Main Event XLIII	Montreal, Quebec, Canada	Bell Centre	Sami Zayn defeated Randy Orton, Trick Williams, and Damian Priest to become the #1 contender to the Undisputed WWE Championship	First Saturday Night's Main Event in Canada since 2007.
25	Progress	Chapter 189: In Darkest Night	London, England	Electric Ballroom	Alexxis Falcon defeated Rayne Leverkusen (c) to win the Progress World Women's Championship	
29	MLW	Battle Riot VIII	Kissimmee, Florida	Osceola Heritage Park Events Center	Killer Kross last eliminated Alex Hammerstone and Matt Riddle in the 40-man Battle Riot match to win the MLW World Heavyweight Championship	Aired on tape delay on February 5.
30	WWE: Evolve	Succession II	Orlando, Florida	WWE Performance Center	Jackson Drake (c) defeated Cappuccino Jones to retain the WWE Evolve Championship	Aired on tape delay on March 4 as a special episode of Evolve.
31	GCW	Crushed Up	Philadelphia, Pennsylvania	Harrah's Philadelphia	Slade and BearDozer (Matt Tremont and Bear Bronson) defeated VNDL48 (Atticus Cogar, Otis Cogar, and Christian Napier)	
31	ROH; MPx	ROH x Metroplex Global Wars	Arlington, Texas	Esports Arena Arlington	Deonna Purrazzo, Hyan, and Maya World defeated M.I.T (Athena, Billie Starkz, and Diamanté)	Aired on tape delay on February 5.
31	WWE: Raw; SmackDown	Royal Rumble	Riyadh, Saudi Arabia	Riyadh Season Stadium at King Abdullah Financial District	Roman Reigns last eliminated Gunther in the 30-man Royal Rumble match to earn a World Heavyweight Championship match at WrestleMania 42	First Royal Rumble held outside of North America. Featured the WWE return of Brie Bella, the final match of AJ Styles, and the WWE debut of Royce Keys.
(c) – denotes defending champion(s)

=== February ===
Date	Promotion(s)	Event	Location	Venue	Main event	Notes
3	Stardom	New Blood 28	Tokyo, Japan	Tokyo Square in Itabashi	Sakurara (Aya Sakura and Sayaka Kurara) (c) defeated Yuna Mizumori and Anne Kanaya to retain the New Blood Tag Team Championship	
4	Stardom	New Blood 29	Tokyo, Japan	Tokyo Square in Itabashi	Hanako defeated Akira Kurogane	
5	REVOLVER	Kross Hour	Dayton, Ohio	Calumet Center at Montgomery County Fairgrounds	Killer Kross (c) defeated Bear Bronson to retain the MLW World Heavyweight Championship	
6	GCW	Jersey J-Cup	Jersey City, New Jersey	White Eagle Hall	1 Called Manders defeated Mad Dog Connelly in a Steel Cage match	
7	GCW	Jersey J-Cup	Jersey City, New Jersey	White Eagle Hall	Charles Mason defeated Billie Starkz (c) in the Jersey J-Cup final to win the JCW World Championship	
7	GWF	Global Warning	Berlin, Germany	Festsaal Kruezberg	Andrade El Ídolo defeated Rambo (c) to win the GWF World Championship	
7	MLW	Lucha Apocalypto	Cicero, Illinois	Cicero Stadium	Mads Krule Krügger defeated Bishop Dyer	Taping for MLW Fusion.
7	Stardom	Supreme Fight	Osaka, Japan	Osaka Prefectural Gymnasium	Saya Kamitani (c) defeated Starlight Kid to retain the World of Stardom Championship	
11	NJPW	The New Beginning in Osaka	Osaka, Japan	Osaka Prefectural Gymnasium	Yota Tsuji (c) defeated Jake Lee to retain the IWGP Heavyweight Championship	Featured the final NJPW match of Hiromu Takahashi.
13	TNA	No Surrender	Nashville, Tennessee	The Pinnacle	Mike Santana and Leon Slater defeated Nic Nemeth and Eddie Edwards	Featured the return of Mickie James.
14	AEW	Grand Slam Australia	Sydney, New South Wales, Australia	Qudos Bank Arena	MJF (c) defeated Brody King to retain the AEW World Championship	
14	GCW	The Coldest Winter 4	Los Angeles, California	Ukrainian Culture Center	Otis Cogar (c) defeated Ciclope to retain the GCW Ultraviolent Championship	
15	GCW	Holy Smokes	Mesa, Arizona	Nile Theater	Atticus Cogar (c) defeated Sam Stackhouse to retain the GCW World Championship	
15	Progress	Chapter 190: In Brightest Day	London, England	Electric Ballroom	Alexxis Falcon (c) defeated Rhio to retain the Progress World Women's Championship	
20	Progress	Chapter 191: For The Love Of Progress 4	Manchester, England	Bowlers BEC Arena	Man Like DeReiss, Simon Miller, and Charles Crowley defeated Saxon Huxley, Bullit, and Jack Morris	
20	HOG	No Turning Back	New York City, New York	NYC Arena	MJF (c) defeated Zilla Fatu to retain the AEW World Championship	
20	Prestige	Roseland XIII: The End	Portland, Oregon	Roseland Theater	Judas Icarus defeated Kevin Blackwood (c) to win the Prestige World Championship	Final ever Prestige Wrestling event. Featured the final match of Kevin Blackwood.
27	NJPW	The New Beginning USA	Trenton, New Jersey	CURE Insurance Arena	Yota Tsuji (c) defeated Andrade El Ídolo to retain the IWGP Global Heavyweight Championship	First The New Beginning USA event since 2022. Featured David Finlay's final NJPW match.
27	GCW	What's My Name?	Rochester, New York	Water Street Music Hall	Atticus Cogar (c) defeated Cheech to retain the GCW World Championship	
27	GCW	Baller Blockin'	Hartford, Connecticut	Webster Theater	Otis Cogar (c) vs. Matt Tremont for the GCW Ultraviolent Championship ended in a no contest	
27	WWE: Raw; SmackDown	Elimination Chamber	Chicago, Illinois	United Center	Randy Orton defeated LA Knight, Cody Rhodes, Je'Von Evans, Trick Williams, and Logan Paul in the Men's Elimination Chamber match to earn an Undisputed WWE Championship match at WrestleMania 42	First televised WWE event in the United Center in 32 years.
27	JCW	Juggalo Weekend	Factory Town	Hialeah, Florida	Mr. Anderson (c) defeated Kerry Morton to retain the JCW Heavyweight Championship	
28	JCW	Juggalo Weekend	Factory Town	Hialeah, Florida	CoKane defeated Mr. Anderson (c) to win the JCW Heavyweight Championship	
(c) – denotes defending champion(s)

=== March ===
Date	Promotion(s)	Event	Location	Venue	Main event	Notes
1	GWF	Chaos City	Berlin, Germany	Festaal Kruezberg	Rambo defeated Metehan, Axel Tischer, Trent Seven, and Robert Dreissker in a Chaos Key match	
6	NJPW	54th Anniversary Show	Tokyo, Japan	Ota City General Gymnasium	Douki (c) defeated Master Wato to retain the IWGP Junior Heavyweight Championship	
6	GCW	They Said It Couldn't Be Done (in Kentucky)	Louisville, Kentucky	Bourbon Hall	Otis Cogar (c) defeated Reed Bentley to retain the GCW Ultraviolent Championship	
7	GCW	So Alive	Columbus, Ohio	Valley Dale Ballroom	VNDL48 (Atticus Cogar, Otis Cogar, and Christian Napier) defeated The Second Gear Crew (Mance Warner, AJ Gray, and Matthew Justice)	
7	WWE: NXT	Vengeance Day	Orlando, Florida	WWE Performance Center	Joe Hendry (c) defeated Ricky Saints to retain the NXT Championship	
8	CF: Noah	Apex Conquest; Night 1	Yokohama, Japan	Yokohama Budokan	Yoshiki Inamura (c) defeated Kenoh to retain the GHC Heavyweight Championship	
8	GCW	Ransom	Chicago, Illinois	Thalia Hall	VNDL48 (Otis Cogar and Christian Napier) defeated Shotzi Blackheart and Vipress in a Deathmatch	
8	EVE	EVE 146: Wrestle Queendom VIII	London, England	Indigo at The O2	Session Moth Martina defeated Rhio (c) to win the Pro-Wrestling: EVE Championship	
14	AAA	Rey de Reyes	Puebla de Zaragoza, Mexico	Auditorio GNP Seguros	Dominik Mysterio (c) defeated El Hijo del Vikingo in a Leave AAA vs. Last Chance No Disqualification match to retain the AAA Mega Championship	Taping for Lucha Libre AAA.
14	GCW	Ashes to Ashes	Atlantic City, New Jersey	Showboat Atlantic City	Otis Cogar (c) defeated Conor Claxton to retain the GCW Ultraviolent Championship	
15	GCW	So Much Fun	Atlantic City, New Jersey	Showboat Atlantic City	Matt Tremont defeated Christian Napier in a Career vs. Title Shot Atlantic City Street Fight to earn a GCW Ultraviolent Championship match	
15	Stardom	Cinderella Tournament (Final)	Yokohama, Japan	Yokohama Budokan	Cosmic Angels (Sayaka Kurara and Natsupoi) defeated H.A.T.E. (Saya Kamitani and Konami)	
15	AEW	Revolution	Los Angeles, California	Crypto.com Arena	MJF (c) defeated "Hangman" Adam Page in a Last Chance Texas Deathmatch to retain the AEW World Championship	Featured the returns of Adam Copeland, Christian Cage, and Will Ospreay, and an appearance by Ronda Rousey.
18	AEW	Slam Dunk Saturday	Fresno, California	Save Mart Center at Fresno State	The Death Riders (Claudio Castagnoli and Daniel Garcia) defeated Komander and Máscara Dorada	Taped as special episodes of AEW Collision. Aired on March 21 and 22 at 11 PM EST due to TNT's coverage of the 2026 NCAA Division I men's basketball tournament.
18	AEW	Slam Dunk Sunday	Fresno, California	Save Mart Center at Fresno State	Místico and JetSpeed (Kevin Knight and Mike Bailey) (c) defeated The Don Callis Family (El Clon, Josh Alexander, and Konosuke Takeshita) to retain the AEW World Trios Championship	Taped as special episodes of AEW Collision. Aired on March 21 and 22 at 11 PM EST due to TNT's coverage of the 2026 NCAA Division I men's basketball tournament.
21	RevPro	High Stakes	Wolverhampton, England	The Hangar	Jay Joshua (c) defeated 1 Called Manders to retain the Undisputed British Heavyweight Championship	
21	NJPW	New Japan Cup (Final)	Nagaoka, Japan	City Hall Plaza Aore Nagaoka	Callum Newman defeated Yuya Uemura in the New Japan Cup final	
21	HOG	SuperClash	Brentwood, New York	Suffolk Credit Union Arena	Donovan Dijak defeated Charles Mason (c) via disqualification for the HOG Heavyweight Championship	
22	CF: DDT	Judgement	Tokyo, Japan	Korakuen Hall	Yuki Ueno (c) defeated Kanon to retain the KO-D Openweight Championship	
22	JCW	The Panic Zone	Grewal Hall at 224	Lansing, Michigan	Nic Nemeth defeated Kerry Morton and Shane Mercer in a No Disqualification two on one handicap match	
25	Stardom	New Blood 30	Tokyo, Japan	Shin-Kiba 1st Ring	Ranna Yagami (c) defeated Aya Sakura to retain the Future of Stardom Championship	
27	TNA	Sacrifice	Westwego, Louisiana	Alario Center	Mike Santana (c) vs. Steve Maclin for the TNA World Championship ended in a no contest	
27	MLP; ROH	Global Wars Canada	Windsor, Ontario, Canada	St. Clair College SportsPlex	The Good Brothers (Doc Gallows and Karl Anderson) defeated Kaito Kiyomiya and Bishop Dyer, GOA (Bishop Kaun and Toa Liona), and Bryce Hanson and Sheldon Jean to become the inaugural MLP Tag Team Champions	
28	MLP	Uprising	Windsor, Ontario, Canada	St. Clair College SportsPlex	Stu Grayson defeated Jay Lethal, Michael Oku, Rohan Raja, Rich Swann, and Jonathan Gresham in a Gauntlet match to become the interim MLP Canadian Champion	
29	CF: TJPW	Grand Princess '26	Tokyo, Japan	Ryogoku Kokugikan	Yuki Arai defeated Miu Watanabe (c) to win the Princess of Princess Championship	
29	Progress	Chapter 192: Cause & Effect	London, England	Electric Ballroom	Man Like DeReiss (c) defeated Kid Lykos to retain the PROGRESS World Championship	
(c) – denotes defending champion(s)

=== April ===
Date	Promotion(s)	Event	Location	Venue	Main event	Notes
3	GCW	Last Call	Las Vegas, Nevada	FSW Arena	Bear Bronson defeated 1 Called Manders	
4	GCW	Maniac	Los Angeles, California	Ukrainian Culture Center	BearDozer (Bear Bronson and Matt Tremont) vs. Otis Cogar and Krule ended in a no contest	
4	NJPW	Sakura Genesis	Tokyo, Japan	Ryōgoku Kokugikan	Callum Newman defeated Yota Tsuji (c) to win the IWGP Heavyweight Championship	Featured Will Ospreay's first NJPW match since 2024.
4	NWA	Crockett Cup	Forney, Texas	OC Theater	Titans of Calamity (Ren Ayabe and Talos) defeated The Country Gentlemen (AJ Cazana and KC Cazana) in the Crockett Cup final	Taping for NWA Powerrr.
4	WWE: NXT	Stand & Deliver	Chesterfield, Missouri	The Factory at The District	Tony D'Angelo defeated Joe Hendry (c), Ricky Saints, and Ethan Page to win the NXT Championship	First Stand & Deliver not to be held during WrestleMania week and the first to be streamed on YouTube.
11	TNA	Rebellion	Cleveland, Ohio	Wolstein Center	Mike Santana (c) defeated Eddie Edwards to retain the TNA World Championship	Featured the TNA returns of KC Navarro and EC3.
12	CF: Noah	Apex Conquest; Night 2	Nagoya, Japan	Kinjofuto Arena	Yoshiki Inamura (c) defeated Alpha Wolf to retain the GHC Heavyweight Championship	
12	RevPro	Epic Encounter	Cardiff, Wales	Vale Arena	Jay Joshua (c) defeated Will Kroos to retain the Undisputed British Heavyweight Championship	
12	AEW	Dynasty	Vancouver, British Columbia, Canada	Rogers Arena	MJF (c) defeated Kenny Omega to retain the AEW World Championship	Featured the returns of Kamille and Kyle O'Reilly.
12	MLW; NJPW; CMLL	Fantastica Mania USA	Charleston, South Carolina	Festival Hall	Mads Krule Krügger vs. Big Damo ended in a no contest	Taping for MLW Fusion. Aired as a three-week event from July 18 to August 1. Featured the MLW debut of Big Damo and the MLW return of Josef Samael.
12	MLW	Blood and Thunder	Charleston, South Carolina	Festival Hall	Killer Kross (c) defeated Satoshi Kojima to retain the MLW World Heavyweight Championship	Aired on tape delay on August 8.
14	WWE: NXT	Revenge; Week 1	Orlando, Florida	WWE Performance Center	Lola Vice (c) defeated Jacy Jayne to retain the NXT Women's Championship	Aired as a special episode of NXT.
15	AEW	Spring BreakThru	Everett, Washington	Angel of the Winds Arena	Darby Allin defeated MJF (c) to win the AEW World Championship	Aired as a special episode of Dynamite.
15	AEW	Spring BreakThru	Everett, Washington	Angel of the Winds Arena	Thekla (c) defeated Alex Windsor to retain the AEW Women's World Championship	Aired on tape delay on April 16 as a special episode of Collision.
15	Poder~!	PoderMania!~	Paradise, Nevada	Horseshoe Las Vegas	Billie Starkz defeated Charli Evans	Part of The Collective.
15	DGUSA	The Gate of Sin City	Paradise, Nevada	Horseshoe Las Vegas	Dragon Kid, Kzy, and Yuki Yoshioka defeated Gajadokuro (Madoka Kikuta, Ishin, and Yoshiki Kato)	Part of The Collective.
15	Hybrid; PWU	Midnight Xpress	Paradise, Nevada	Horseshoe Las Vegas	Pat Dynamite (c) defeated Jack Evans to retain the PWU World Championship	Part of The Collective.
16	CF: TJPW	Live in Las Vegas	Paradise, Nevada	Pearl Concert Theater	Yuki Arai (c) defeated J-Rod to retain the Princess of Princess Championship	Part of Palms Slam Fest.
16	CMLL	CMLL at Palms Slam Fest	Paradise, Nevada	Pearl Concert Theater	Místico and Templario defeated Hechicero and Ángel de Oro	Part of Palms Slam Fest.
16	HOG	Culture Clash	Paradise, Nevada	Pearl Concert Theater	The Hardys (Matt Hardy and Jeff Hardy) (c) defeated The Mane Event (Jay Lyon and Midas Black) and The Good Brothers (Doc Gallows and Karl Anderson) to retain the HOG Tag Team Championship	Part of Palms Slam Fest.
16	Progress	Chapter 193: Progress Las Vegas II	Paradise, Nevada	Horseshoe Las Vegas	Man Like DeReiss (c) defeated Michael Oku to retain the Progress World Championship	Part of The Collective.
16	Independent	Mark Hitchcock Memorial SuperShow	Paradise, Nevada	Horseshoe Las Vegas	The Demand (Ricochet, Bishop Kaun and Toa Liona) defeated Michael Oku and JetSpeed (Kevin Knight and Mike Bailey)	Part of The Collective.
16	NJPW	Death Vegas Invitational	Paradise, Nevada	Horseshoe Las Vegas	The H8 Club (Nick Gage and Matt Tremont) defeated El Desperado and Jun Kasai, and Masashi Takeda and Rina Yamashita in a Love and Pieces three-way tag team Deathmatch	Part of The Collective.
16	GCW	MDK Fight Club	Paradise, Nevada	Horseshoe Las Vegas	Hayabusa and Masato Tanaka defeated Bear Bronson and Mr. Danger	Part of The Collective.
17	GCW	Gringo Loco's The Wrld on Lucha	Paradise, Nevada	Horseshoe Las Vegas	El Desperado defeated Vipress in a Lucha Extrema Deathmatch	Part of The Collective.
17	GCW	Josh Barnett's Bloodsport XV	Paradise, Nevada	Horseshoe Las Vegas	Josh Barnett defeated Yuji Nagata	Part of The Collective.
17	GCW	Joey Janela's Spring Break X	Paradise, Nevada	Horseshoe Las Vegas	Brodie Lee Jr. defeated Joey Janela	Part of The Collective. Featured The Sandman's retirement match.
17	JCW	Strangle-Mania: Viva Las Violence	Paradise, Nevada	Horseshoe Las Vegas	Vampiro defeated PCO and Big Vito	Part of The Collective. Featured Vampiro's retirement match.
17	Stardom	American Dream	Paradise, Nevada	Pearl Concert Theater	Neo Genesis (Starlight Kid, AZM, and Mei Seira) defeated Kris Statlander and Babes of Wrath (Willow Nightingale and Harley Cameron)	Part of Palms Slam Fest.
17	MLP	Multiverse	Paradise, Nevada	Pearl Concert Theater	Amazing Red and El Sky Team (Mistico and Máscara Dorada) defeated The Rascalz (Zachary Wentz, Dezmond Xavier, and Myron Reed)	Part of Palms Slam Fest.
18	GCW	Effy's Big Gay Brunch 11	Paradise, Nevada	Horseshoe Las Vegas	Dark Sheik defeated Nyla Rose	Part of The Collective.
18	GCW	Joey Janela's Spring Break: The Immortal Clusterfuck	Paradise, Nevada	Horseshoe Las Vegas	Shotzi Blackheart won the Immortal Clusterfuck Battle Royal by last eliminating Slade	Part of The Collective.
18	WWE: Raw; SmackDown	WrestleMania 42	Paradise, Nevada	Allegiant Stadium	Cody Rhodes (c) defeated Randy Orton to retain the Undisputed WWE Championship	Featured the returns of Paige and Bron Breakker.
19	WWE: Raw; SmackDown	WrestleMania 42	Paradise, Nevada	Allegiant Stadium	Roman Reigns defeated CM Punk (c) to win the World Heavyweight Championship	
19	GWF	Mystery Mayhem	Berlin, Germany	Festsaal Kreuzberg	Ahura defeated Andrade El Ídolo (c) to win the GWF World Championship	
21	WWE: NXT	Revenge; Week 2	Orlando, Florida	WWE Performance Center	Zaria defeated Sol Ruca in a Last Woman Standing match	Aired as a special episode of NXT.
22	AEW	Playoff Palooza	Portland, Oregon	Veterans Memorial Coliseum	The Demand (Ricochet, Bishop Kaun, and Toa Liona) defeated Chris Jericho and The Hurt Syndicate (Bobby Lashley and Shelton Benjamin)	Aired on tape delay on April 25 as a special episode of AEW Collision. Aired immediately following TNT's coverage of the 2026 Stanley Cup playoffs.
24	REVOLVER	Revolver Strong	Dayton, Ohio	Calumet Center at Montgomery County Fairgrounds	Alex Colon defeated Ganger in a Deathmatch	
25	NJPW	Wrestling Redzone in Hiroshima	Hiroshima, Japan	Hiroshima Sun Plaza	Knock Out Brothers (Yuto-Ice and Oskar ) (c) defeated Bishamon (Hirooki Goto and Yoshi-Hashi) to retain the IWGP Tag Team Championship	
26	Stardom	All Star Grand Queendom	Yokohama, Japan	Yokohama Arena	Sayaka Kurara defeated Saya Kamitani (c) to win the World of Stardom Championship	
26	JCW	Opening Day	Ridgefield Park, New Jersey	Ridgefield Park Knights of Columbus	Charles Mason (c) defeated Marcus Mathers to retain the JCW World Championship	
29	NJPW	Wrestling Hizen no Kuni	Saga, Japan	Saga Arena	Douki (c) defeated Tiger Mask in a Lumberjack match to retain the IWGP Junior Heavyweight Championship	
(c) – denotes defending champion(s)

=== May ===
Date	Promotion(s)	Event	Location	Venue	Main event	Notes
1	CMLL; MLW	CMLL vs. MLW	Cuauhtémoc, Mexico City, Mexico	Arena México	Templario defeated Kushida (c) to win the MLW World Middleweight Championship	
1	HOG	Glory at The Globe	Los Angeles, California	Globe Theatre	Charles Mason (c) defeated Jonathan Gresham to retain the HOG Heavyweight Championship	
1	GCW	Express Lane	Joppa, Maryland	RJ Meyer Arena	Matt Tremont and The Rejects (John Wayne Murdoch and Reed Bentley) defeated Jimmy Lloyd, Lil Sicko, and Niño Extremo	
2	GCW	One Night Only	Philadelphia, Pennsylvania	2300 Arena	Nick Gage defeated Bear Bronson in a Deathmatch	
2	CF: Noah	Spring Mayhem	Tokyo, Japan	Ryogoku Kokugikan	Shane Haste defeated Yoshiki Inamura (c) to win the GHC Heavyweight Championship	
3	NJPW	Wrestling Dontaku; Night 1	Fukuoka, Japan	Fukuoka Kokusai Center	Andrade El Ídolo defeated Yota Tsuji (c) to win the IWGP Global Heavyweight Championship	
3	Progress	Chapter 194: Super Strong Style 16 Tournament Edition 2026; Night 1	London, England	Electric Ballroom	Cara Noir defeated Man Like DeReiss (c) to win the PROGRESS World Championship	
4	NJPW	Wrestling Dontaku; Night 2	Fukuoka, Japan	Fukuoka Kokusai Center	Callum Newman (c) defeated Shingo Takagi to retain the IWGP Heavyweight Championship	
4	Progress	Chapter 194: Super Strong Style 16 Tournament Edition 2026; Night 2	London, England	Electric Ballroom	Rhio defeated Gisele Shaw in the Women's Super Strong Style 16 tournament final	
4	CF: TJPW	Yes! Wonderland	Tokyo, Japan	Korakuen Hall	Yuki Arai (c) defeated Arisu Endo to retain the Princess of Princess Championship	
9	MLW	Kings of Colosseum	The Signal	Chattanooga, Tennessee	Killer Kross (c) defeated Josh Bishop to retain the MLW World Heavyweight Championship	Aired on tape delay on September 5 as a special episode of MLW Fusion.
9	AEW	Fairway to Hell	Palm Beach Gardens, Florida	SoFi Center	Darby Allin (c) defeated Pac in a no countout match to retain the AEW World Championship	Aired as a special episode of AEW Collision.
9	WWE: Raw; SmackDown	Backlash	Tampa, Florida	Benchmark International Arena	Roman Reigns (c) defeated Jacob Fatu to retain the World Heavyweight Championship	
10	GWF	World Cup	Festaal Kreuzberg	Berlin, Germany	Kouga defeated Teoman, Arez, and Rambo in a four-way elimination match to win the World Cup	
12	UJPW: NJPW; BJW; Noah; DDT; DG; Kyushu Pro; Freedoms; GanPro	Face the Next	Tokyo, Japan	Shinjuku Face	Kazuma Sumi, Munetatsu Nakamura, and Ryoya Tanaka defeated Ilusion, Daiki Nagai, and Daiki Odashima	
15	ROH	Supercard of Honor	Salisbury, Maryland	Wicomico Youth and Civic Center	Athena (c) defeated Maya World, Trish Adora, Yuka Sakazaki, Billie Starkz, and Zayda Steel in a Survival of the Fittest match for the ROH Women's World Championship	Featured the inaugural women's Survival of the Fittest match and the ROH returns of Matt Taven and Mike Bennett.
15	GCW	Guilty Conscience	Detroit, Michigan	Harpos Concert Theatre	John Wayne Murdoch defeated Slade in a Deathmatch	
16	GCW	Gateway to The Death 3	Sauget, Illinois	Pop's Nightclub	Anakin Murphy defeated John Wayne Murdoch in a Deathmatch	
17	GCW	Ring of Dreams	West Des Moines, Iowa	Val Air Ballroom	Atticus Cogar (c) defeated 1 Called Manders to retain the GCW World Championship	
17	RevPro	Revolution Rumble	Doncaster, England	Doncaster Dome	Connor Mills won the 30-person Revolution Rumble by last eliminating Michael Oku to earn an Undisputed British Heavyweight Championship match at RevPro's 14th Anniversary Show	
22	HOG	Waging War	Jamaica, Queens	NYC Arena	The Hardys (Matt Hardy and Jeff Hardy) (c) defeated Super Smash Brothers (Stu Grayson and Evil Uno) to retain the HOG Tag Team Championship	
23	Independent	Hana Kimura Memorial Show 6	Tokyo, Japan	Korakuen Hall	H.A.T.E. (Konami and Rina) and Veny defeated Jungle Kyona, Mika Iwata and Mio Momono	
23	Marigold	Shine Forever	Tokyo, Japan	Ota City General Gymnasium	Miku Aono, Mai Sakurai and Mirai defeated Utami Hayashishita, Takumi Iroha and Maddy Morgan	
23	Stardom	Queens Dynasty	Inazawa, Japan	Toyoda Gosei Memorial Gymnasium	Sayaka Kurara (c) defeated Maki Itoh to retain the World of Stardom Championship	
23	BZW; GCW	Now or Never	Bapaume, France	Espace Isabelle de Hainaut	Trent Seven (c) defeated Joey Janela to retain the BZW World Championship	Aired on tape delay on May 29.
23	WWE: Raw; SmackDown	Saturday Night's Main Event XLIV	Fort Wayne, Indiana	Allen County War Memorial Coliseum	The Vision (Logan Paul and Austin Theory) (c) defeated The Street Profits (Montez Ford and Angelo Dawkins) to retain the World Tag Team Championship	First televised WWE event in Fort Wayne since 2014.
24	GCW; SAJ	Live in Milan	Milan, Italy	Centro Sport Cesate	Team GCW (1 Called Manders, Jimmy Lloyd, and Drew Parker) defeated Team SAJ (Luca Bjorn, Sebastian de Witt, and Spencer)	Aired on tape delay on May 30.
24	AEW	Double or Nothing	Queens, New York	Louis Armstrong Stadium	MJF defeated Darby Allin (c) in a Title vs. Hair match to win the AEW World Championship	Featured the AEW debut of Mick Foley and the return of Kyle Fletcher.
29	WWE: Evolve	Succession III	Orlando, Florida	WWE Performance Center	Aaron Rourke (c) defeated Max Abrams to retain the WWE Evolve Men's Championship	Aired on tape delay on June 24 as a special episode of Evolve.
30	AAA	Noche de Los Grandes	Monterrey, Mexico	Arena Monterrey	El Grande Americano defeated "The Original" El Grande Americano in a No Disqualification Mask vs. Mask match	Taping for Lucha Libre AAA. Aired as a two-week event on May 30 to June 6.
31	WWE: Raw; SmackDown	Clash in Italy	Turin, Italy	Inalpi Arena	Roman Reigns (c) defeated Jacob Fatu in Tribal Combat to retain the World Heavyweight Championship and position as Tribal Chief of the Anoaʻi family	First WWE PLE to take place in Italy.
(c) – denotes defending champion(s)

=== June ===
Date	Promotion(s)	Event	Location	Venue	Main event	Notes
6	NWA	Hard Times 6	Atlanta, Georgia	Center Stage	Silas Mason (c) defeated Kerry Morton to retain the NWA Worlds Heavyweight Championship	Taping for NWA Powerrr.
6	GCW	Tournament of Survival 11	Atlantic City, New Jersey	Showboat Atlantic City	Masashi Takeda defeated Mr. Danger in a Deathmatch in the Tournament of Survival 11 final	
7	GCW	Cage of Survival 5	Atlantic City, New Jersey	Showboat Atlantic City	Otis Cogar defeated Matt Tremont (c), Anakin Murphy, Conor Claxton, Dr. Redacted, Gabby Forza, Jamesen Shook, Jeffrey John, Jimmy Lloyd, Lil Sicko, Lucky 13, Masashi Takeda, and Vipress in a Cage of Survival match to win the GCW Ultraviolent Championship	
7	NJPW	Best of the Super Juniors 33 (Final)	Tokyo, Japan	Ota City General Gymnasium	Yoh defeated Kosei Fujita in the Best of the Super Juniors tournament final	
7	Progress	Chapter 195: Wonderbrawl II	Manchester, England	O_{2} Ritz	The 0121 (Drilla Moloney and Man Like DeReiss) defeated Young Guns (Ethan Allen and Luke Jacobs) (c) to win the Progress Tag Team Championship	
7	GWF	Rising Heat	Berlin, Germany	Festsaal Kreuzberg	Ahura (c) defeated Axel Tischer to retain the GWF World Championship	
7	CF: TJPW	Stand Alone	Tokyo, Japan	Korakuen Hall	Yuki Arai (c) defeated Yuki Kamifuku to retain the Princess of Princess Championship	
10	AEW	Summer Blockbuster; Night 1	Cincinnati, Ohio	Andrew J. Brady Music Center	Swerve Strickland defeated Brody King in an Owen Hart Foundation Men's Tournament semifinal match	Aired as a special episode of AEW Dynamite.
10	ROH; CMLL; Stardom	Global Wars Cincinnati	Cincinnati, Ohio	Andrew J. Brady Music Center	Lio Rush defeated AR Fox (c) and Action Andretti to win the ROH World Television Championship	Aired on tape delay on June 18 as a special episode of ROH Wrestling.
11	ROH; CMLL; Stardom	Global Wars Cincinnati	Cincinnati, Ohio	Andrew J. Brady Music Center	Deonna Purrazzo (c) defeated Olympia to retain the ROH Women's Pure Championship	Aired on tape delay on June 25 as a special episode of ROH Wrestling.
11	AEW	Summer Blockbuster; Night 2	Cincinnati, Ohio	Andrew J. Brady Music Center	Death Riders (Jon Moxley, Claudio Castagnoli, Pac, Daniel Garcia, and Marina Shafir) defeated Shane Taylor Promotions (Shane Taylor, Lee Moriarty, Carlie Bravo, Capt. Shawn Dean, and Trish Adora) in a Cincinnati Street Fight	Aired on tape delay on June 13 a special episode of AEW Collision.
12	MLW	Summer of the Beasts	Philadelphia, Pennsylvania	2300 Arena	Killer Kross (c) defeated Donovan Dijak to retain the MLW World Heavyweight Championship	Taping for MLW Fusion.
12	REVOLVER	No Country for Ole Mancer	Dayton, Ohio	Calumet Center at Montgomery County Fairgrounds	Brent Oakley defeated BDE (c) in a Dayton Street Fight to win the Revolver Remix Championship.	
13	JCW	Saturday Nite	Ridgefield Park, New Jersey	Ridgefield Park Knights of Columbus	Charles Mason (c) defeated Terry Yaki to retain the JCW World Championship	
14	NJPW	Dominion 6.14 in Osaka-jo Hall	Osaka, Japan	Osaka-jō Hall	Yota Tsuji defeated Callum Newman (c) to win the IWGP Heavyweight Championship	
19	CMLL; NJPW	Fantastica Mania Mexico	Cuauhtémoc, Mexico City, Mexico	Arena México	Místico, Blue Panther, and Tiger Mask defeated Averno, Volador Jr., and Black Tiger	
19	HOG	Inferno	Chicago, Illinois	Logan Square Auditorium	Charles Mason (c) defeated Nic Nemeth to retain the HOG Heavyweight Championship	
19	GCW	Rage Against Time	Cincinnati, Ohio	Twentieth Century Theatre	Otis Cogar (c) defeated Anakin Murphy to retain the GCW Ultraviolent Championship	First GCW event in Cincinnati.
20	GCW	The Last Ones Left	Indianapolis, Indiana	Fountain Square Theatre	Dr. Redacted defeated Dale Patricks	
20	NJPW	Yuji Nagata Produce Bue Justice XVIII	Kimitsu, Japan	Kimitsu City Gymnasium	Yuji Nagata, Josh Barnett, and Aaron Wolf defeated House of Torture (Ren Narita, Yujiro Takahashi, and Yoshinobu Kanemaru)	
20	Stardom	The Conversion	Tokyo, Japan	Yoyogi National Gymnasium	Suzu Suzuki defeated Sayaka Kurara (c) to win the World of Stardom Championship	
25	CF: Noah	Legacy Rise; Night 2	Tokyo, Japan	Korakuen Hall	Shane Haste (c) defeated Tetsuya Endo to retain the GHC Heavyweight Championship	
27	WWE: Raw; SmackDown	Night of Champions	Riyadh, Saudi Arabia	Kingdom Arena	Sami Zayn defeated Cody Rhodes (c) and Gunther to win the Undisputed WWE Championship	
27	RevPro	British J-Cup	Stevenage, England	Gordon Craig Theatre	Nino Bryant defeated Leon Cage, Will Kaven, and Robbie X in a four-way elimination match to win the British J-Cup	
27	GCW	Amerikaz Most Wanted	Los Angeles, California	Ukrainian Culture Center	Otis Cogar (c) defeated Anakin Murphy, Vipress, Mr. Danger, Slade and JKM in a Scramble to retain the GCW Ultraviolent Championship	
28	GCW	Life of Crime	Mesa, Arizona	The Nile Theater	Nick Gage and Slade defeated Shotzi Blackheart and Vipress in a intergender tag team deathmatch	
28	CF: DDT	King of Kings	Tokyo, Japan	Korakuen Hall	Yuki Ueno (c) defeated Shinya Aoki to retain the KO-D Openweight Championship	
28	TNA	Slammiversary	Boston, Massachusetts	Agganis Arena	Nic Nemeth defeated Mike Santana (c) to win the TNA World Championship	Featured the introduction of the TNA Knockouts Television Championship and the TNA debut of Uhaa Nation.
28	WWE: NXT	The Great American Bash	Orlando, Florida	WWE Performance Center	Kendal Grey defeated Lola Vice (c) to win the NXT Women's Championship	First NXT PLE on The CW.
28	AEW; CMLL; NJPW; Stardom	Forbidden Door	San Jose, California	SAP Center	Will Ospreay defeated Swerve Strickland in the finals of the Men's Owen Hart Foundation tournament	Featured the return of Jay White.
(c) – denotes defending champion(s)

=== July ===
Date	Promotion(s)	Event	Location	Venue	Main event	Notes
4	GCW	Bash at the Ballpark	Coney Island, Brooklyn, New York	Maimonides Park	Nick Gage defeated Joey Janela	
5	GCW	Backyard Wrestling 8	New Jersey	Unknown	Mister Jay defeated Lil Skittle in a Steel Cage of Rage match	
7	NJPW	Tiger Mask's Retirement Match	Tokyo, Japan	Korakuen Hall	Tiger Mask IV defeated Black Tiger	Featured Tiger Mask IV's retirement match.
8	AEW	Beach Break	Clearwater Beach, Florida	The BayCare Sound at Coachman Park	Kenny Omega defeated MJF (c) in a Last Chance match to win the AEW World Championship	Aired as a special episode of Dynamite.
11	NJPW	G1 Climax 36; Night 1	Hoffman Estates, Illinois	Now Arena	Yota Tsuji defeated Konosuke Takeshita in a G1 Climax Block A match	First G1 Climax show to be held in the U.S. since 2019.
11	REVOVLER	Roulette	Dayton, Ohio	Montgomery County Fairgrounds	Joseph Sawyer defeated Rich Swann	
11	GCW	You Only Die Once	Hartford, Connecticut	Webster Theater	Vipress defeated Slade in a Deathmatch	
12	GCW	The Melee in Manchester	Manchester, New Hampshire	Bishop Leo E. O'Neil Center	Atticus Cogar (c) defeated Donovan Dijak to retain the GCW World Championship	
12	GWF	Summer Smash	Berlin, Germany	Astra Kulturhaus	Ahura (c) defeated Kouga to retain the GWF World Championship	
17	WWE: Evolve	ID Showcase Special	Orlando, Florida	WWE Performance Center	WWE ID 1.0 (Aaron Rourke, It's Gal, Marcus Mathers, and Sam Holloway) defeated The Mog Squad (CJ Valor, Jacari Ball, Max Abrams, and Santi Rivera) in a Team Gauntlet series eight-man tag team elimination match	Aired on tape delay on September 9 as a special episode of Evolve.
17	WWE: Evolve	Women's Showcase Special	Orlando, Florida	WWE Performance Center	Nikkita Lyons (c) defeated Skylar Raye to retain the Evolve Women's Championship	Aired on tape delay on September 23 as a special episode of Evolve.
18	WWE: Evolve	Evolve: Succession IV	Orlando, Florida	WWE Performance Center	Nikkita Lyons (c) defeated Wendy Choo in a Last Woman Standing match to retain the Evolve Women's Championship	Aired on tape delay on October 14 as a special episode of Evolve.
18	WWE: Raw; SmackDown	Saturday Night's Main Event XLV	New York City, New York	Madison Square Garden	CM Punk and Cody Rhodes defeated Gunther and Sami Zayn	First Saturday Night's Main Event in Madison Square Garden since August 2007.
18	RevPro	Summer Sizzler	Bradford, England	Bradford Live	Michael Oku (c) defeated Leon Slater to retain the Undisputed British Heavyweight Championship	
18	CF: TJPW	Summer Sun Princess	Tokyo, Japan	Korakuen Hall	Yuki Arai (c) defeated Miyu Yamashita to retain the Princess of Princess Championship	
18	CF: Noah	Summer Epic	Tokyo, Japan	Intex Osaka	Shane Haste (c) defeated Ozawa to retain the GHC Heavyweight Championship	
18	GCW	The Life of a Boss	Dallas, Texas	Gilley's Dallas	Otis Cogar (c) defeated Niño Extremo to retain the GCW Ultraviolent Championship	
19	GCW	The Tussle in Tulsa	Broken Arrow, Oklahoma	Property Event Center	Gabby Forza and Cowboy Way (Thomas Shire and 1 Called Manders) defeated VNDL48 (Atticus Cogar, Otis Cogar, and Christian Napier)	
24	REVOLVER	The Silence of The Slams	Nashville, Tennessee	The Troubador	Joseph Sawyer defeated Rich Swann	
25	AAA	Verano de Escándalo	Aguascalientes, Mexico	Arena San Marcos	Los Perros del Mal (Daga and Angel) defeated Los Gringos Locos 2.0 (Dominik Mysterio and El Grande Americano)	Taping for Lucha Libre AAA. Aired as a three-week event from July 25 to August 8.
25	NWA	NWA 78th Anniversary Show	Philadelphia, Pennsylvania	2300 Arena	Silas Mason (c) vs. Carson Drake for the NWA Worlds Heavyweight Championship ended in a no contest	Taping for NWA Powerrr.
25	RevPro	Women's Grand Prix (Show 1)	Wolverhampton, England	The Hangar	Alexxis Falcon (c) defeated Lucy Sky to retain the Undisputed British Women's Championship	
25	RevPro	Women's Grand Prix (Show 2)	Wolverhampton, England	The Hangar	Kanji defeated Zeuxis in the Women's Grand Prix final	
26	AEW	Redemption	Montreal, Quebec, Canada	Bell Centre	Kenny Omega (c) defeated Kevin Knight to retain the AEW World Championship	First AEW PPV in Montreal.
26	JCW	In Our House	Ridgefield Park, New Jersey	Ridgefield Park Knights of Columbus	Bear Bronson defeated Charles Mason (c) by disqualification for the JCW World Championship	
26	Progress	Chapter 196: Scorchio	London, England	Electric Ballroom	Cara Noir (c) defeated Charles Crowley to retain the PROGRESS World Championship	
31	GCW	The Top Play	Omaha, Nebraska	Admiral Theatre	The Cogar Brothers (Atticus Cogar and Otis Cogar) defeated Bang and Matthews (Davey Bang and August Matthews)	First GCW event in Omaha.
(c) – denotes defending champion(s)

=== August ===
Date	Promotion(s)	Event	Location	Venue	Main event	Notes
1	GCW	Rude Awakening	Minneapolis, Minnesota	First Avenue	Atticus Cogar (c) defeated Devon Monroe to retain the GCW World Championship	First GCW PPV in Minneapolis.
1	WWE: Raw; SmackDown	SummerSlam	Minneapolis, Minnesota	U.S. Bank Stadium	Oba Femi defeated Brock Lesnar in a Hell in a Cell match	Featured Nick Aldis's first WWE match and first match overall since October 2023, and the return of Randy Orton after a four-month hiatus.
2	WWE: Raw; SmackDown	SummerSlam	Minneapolis, Minnesota	U.S. Bank Stadium	Roman Reigns (c) defeated Seth Rollins to retain the World Heavyweight Championship	Featured the return of Kevin Owens.
2	GCW; F1RST	GCW vs. F1RST	Minneapolis, Minnesota	First Avenue	Arik Cannon and Vipress defeated The Cogar Brothers (Atticus Cogar and Otis Cogar)	
4	AEW; CMLL	Semana Internacional – CMLL vs. AEW; Night 1	Cuauhtémoc, Mexico City, Mexico	Arena México	Kyle Fletcher defeated Titán	
5	AEW; CMLL	Grand Slam Mexico	Cuauhtémoc, Mexico City, Mexico	Arena México	Will Ospreay defeated Mark Davis in a Mexico City Street Fight	
6	GCW	20 Years of Bad Boy	Asbury Park, New Jersey	House of Independents	Nick Wayne and Alec Price defeated Janelasus (Joey Janela and Megan Bayne)	Celebrated Joey Janela's 20th anniversary in professional wrestling.
7	CMLL	Gran Prix Internacional	Cuauhtémoc, Mexico City, Mexico	Arena México	Team Mexico (Místico, Soberano Jr., Bárbaro Cavernario, Ángel de Oro, Templario, Hechicero, Máscara Dorada, Último Guerrero, Volador Jr., Titán, and Xelhua) defeated Team International (Bandido, Rohan Raja, Leon Cage, Blake Christian, Austin Aries, Yujiro Takahashi, Douki, Roderick Strong, Orange Cassidy, Claudio Castagnoli, and Pac) in a Grand Prix Internacional Torneo Cibernético match	
7	HOG	High Intensity	Queens, New York	NYC Arena	Joey Silver defeated Charles Mason (c) in Silvers's Matt Travis Memorial contract cash-in match to win the HOG Heavyweight Championship	
8	GWF	Blockbuster	Berlin, Germany	Festsaal Kreuzberg	Ahura (c) defeated Rotten Moodo to retain the GWF World Championship	
8	AEW; CMLL	Semana Internacional – CMLL vs. AEW; Nights 2 and 3	Cuauhtémoc, Mexico City, Mexico	Arena México	Bandido and Titán defeated El Clon and Templario	
9	AEW; CMLL	Semana Internacional – CMLL vs. AEW; Nights 2 and 3	Cuauhtémoc, Mexico City, Mexico	Arena México	Místico and Bandido defeated The Don Callis Family (Hechicero and El Clon)	
9	Marigold	Summer Destiny	Tokyo, Japan	Ota City General Gymnasium	Miku Aono (c) defeated Nagisa Nozaki to retain the Marigold World Championship	
9	CF: Noah	Legacy Rise; Nights 3 and 4	Tokyo, Japan	Korakuen Hall	Tetsuya Naito defeated Shane Haste (c) to win the GHC Heavyweight Championship	
10	CF: Noah	Legacy Rise; Nights 3 and 4	Tokyo, Japan	Korakuen Hall	Kai Fujimura defeated Eita (c) to win the GHC Junior Heavyweight Championship	
11	CF: DDT	Wrestle Peter Pan	Tokyo, Japan	Ryōgoku Kokugikan	Mao (c) defeated Sanshiro Takagi in Takagi's Right to Challenge Anywhere Anytime contract cash-in match to retain the KO-D Openweight Championship	
15	REVOLVER	Cage of Horrors 5	Dayton, Ohio	Calumet Center At Montgomery County Fairgrounds	Damian Chambers defeated Mance Warner (c), Krule, and Alex Colon in a Cage of Horrors match to win the Revolver World Championship	
15	GCW	Homecoming Weekend	Atlantic City, New Jersey	Showboat Atlantic City	Joseph Sawyer defeated Atticus Cogar (c) to win the GCW World Championship	
16	GCW	Homecoming Weekend	Atlantic City, New Jersey	Showboat Atlantic City	Lil Sicko defeated Niño Extremo in a Circus Deathmatch	
16	NJPW	G1 Climax 36 (Final)	Tokyo, Japan	Ryōgoku Kokugikan	Ryohei Oiwa defeated Yuya Uemura in the G1 Climax 36 final	Featured the NJPW return of Jeff Cobb.
16	RevPro	Unfinished Business	Cardiff, Wales	TramShed Cardiff	Bandido (c) defeated Cameron Khai to retain the ROH World Championship	
20	JCW	Gathering of the Juggalos	Macks Creek, Missouri	Mother Nature's Riverfront Retreat	EC3 vs. Donovan Dijak ended in a no contest	Aired as a special episode of JCW Lunacy.
21	JCW	Bloodymania 19	Macks Creek, Missouri	Mother Nature's Riverfront Retreat	Juggalo World Order (2 Tuff Tony, Willie Mack, Ruffo the Clown, EC3, and Jeeves) defeated Luciano Family Enterprises (Vincenzo, Sally Boy, Painful Paul, Krule, and Donovan Dijak) in a GoreGames weapons on four poles elimination match	
21	ROH	Death Before Dishonor	Philadelphia, Pennsylvania	2300 Arena	Athena (c) defeated Hazuki to retain the ROH Women's World Championship	
23	TNA	Lockdown	Chicago, Illinois	Credit Union 1 Arena	The Nemeths (Nic Nemeth and Ryan Nemeth) defeated The Hardys (Matt Hardy and Jeff Hardy) (c) in a Steel Cage tornado tag team match to win the TNA World Tag Team Championship	First Lockdown since 2016 and first Lockdown pay-per-view since 2014. Featured the TNA return of Kiera Hogan.
23	Stardom	5 Star Grand Prix (Final)	Tokyo, Japan	Ryōgoku Kokugikan	Rina defeated Starlight Kid in the 5 Star Grand Prix final	
23	CF: TJPW	Tokyo Princess Cup (Final)	Tokyo, Japan	Korakuen Hall	Suzume defeated Rika Tatsumi in the Tokyo Princess Cup final	
28	NWA; KFW	EmPowerrr	Sevierville, Tennessee	Sevierville Civic Center	Tiffany Nieves (c) defeated Alice Crowley to retain the NWA World Women's Championship	First EmPowerrr since 2021 and first NWA live event to air in full since 2023.
29	RevPro	14th Anniversary Show	London, England	OVO Arena Wembley	Connor Mills defeated Michael Oku (c) to win the Undisputed British Heavyweight Championship	Featured the RevPro return of Will Ospreay and the RevPro debuts of Jeff Jarrett, and FTR (Dax Harwood and Cash Wheeler).
30	AAA	Ola de Calor	Edinburg, Texas	Bert Ogden Arena	Dragon Lee and The Lucha Brothers (Penta and Rey Fénix) defeated Los Perros del Mal (Daga, Angel and Berto)	
30	WWE: NXT	Heatwave	Edinburg, Texas	Bert Ogden Arena	Grayson Waller defeated Tony D'Angelo (c), Cruz Montana, and Zilla Fatu to win the NXT Championship	
30	AEW	All In	London, England	Wembley Stadium	Will Ospreay defeated Kenny Omega (c) to win the AEW World Championship	Featured the returns of Dr. Britt Baker, D.M.D., and FTR (Dax Harwood and Cash Wheeler), and the debut of The New Level (Kofi and Austin Creed).
31	Progress	Chapter 197: Wrestling Over Everything	London, England	Electric Ballroom	Cara Noir (c) defeated Spike Trivet to retain the PROGRESS World Championship	
(c) – denotes defending champion(s)

=== September ===
Date	Promotion(s)	Event	Location	Venue	Main event	Notes
5	HOG	Fall Out	Los Angeles, California	Globe Theatre	Kyle Fletcher defeated Amazing Red	
6	JCW	Breakdown	Ridgefield Park, New Jersey	Ridgefield Park Knights of Columbus	Charles Mason (c) defeated Jordan Oliver to retain the JCW World Championship	
6	NJPW	Yuji Nagata Produce Blue Justice XIX ~Aogi Futotsu~	Tōgane, Japan	Tōgane Arena	Yuji Nagata and Most Violent Players (Togi Makabe and Toru Yano) defeated Unbound Co. (Daiki Nagai, Yuto-Ice and Oskar)	
6	GWF	Battlefield	Berlin, Germany	Festaal Kreuzberg	Pascal Spalter last eliminated Shaqiri in the 30-man Battlefield match to earn a GWF World Championship match at GWF Legacy: 31 Jahre Berlin Wrestling	
6	WWE: Raw; SmackDown	Sunday Night's Main Event	Atlanta, Georgia	State Farm Arena	Randy Orton defeated Cody Rhodes	First edition of the event, normally called Saturday Night's Main Event, to be held on a Sunday. Featured the return of Bronson Reed.
9	AEW	Rebel Heart	Akins Ford Arena	Athens, Georgia	ProtoJet (Kyle Fletcher and Kevin Knight) defeated The Young Bucks (Matt Jackson and Nick Jackson)	Dedicated to Rebel's fight against ALS. Aired as a special episode of AEW Dynamite.
11	AAA	Triplemanía 34; Night 1	Paradise, Nevada	MGM Grand Garden Arena	Omos defeated Rey Mysterio	
11	GCW	Mind Your Business	Golden, Colorado	Jeffco Fairgrounds	Bear Bronson defeated Orin Veidt in a Deathmatch	
12	GCW	No Signal in The Hills Pt. 5	Los Angeles, California	Ukrainian Cultural Center	Vipress defeated Otis Cogar (c) to win the GCW Ultraviolent Championship	
12	MLW	Fightland	Charleston, South Carolina	Festival Hall	Killer Kross and Josh Bishop defeated Austin Aries and Místico	Aired on September 24 as a special episode of MLW Fusion. Featured the MLW debut of Masha.
12	Stardom	Stardom to the World	Yokohama, Japan	Yokohama Budokan	Suzu Suzuki (c) defeated Natsuko Tora to retain the World of Stardom Championship	
12	RevPro	Raw Deal	Stevenage, England	Gordon Craig Theatre	Connor Mills (c) defeated Mecca to retain the Undisputed British Heavyweight Championship	
12	AEW	A Tribute to "The Butcher" Andy Williams	Springfield, Massachusetts	MassMutual Center	Daniel Garcia last eliminated Josh Alexander in the 12-Man "The Butcher" Battle Royale	Memorial event dedicated to Andy "The Butcher" Williams, who passed away a week prior. Aired as a special episode of Collision.
13	AAA	Triplemanía 34; Night 2	Azcapotzalco, Mexico City, Mexico	Arena CDMX	El Grande Americano defeated Dominik Mysterio (c) in a No Disqualification match to win the AAA Mega Championship	Featured the returns of Niño Hamburguesa and Pagano.
17	JCW	99 Rewind	New Baltimore, Michigan	Diesel Concert Lounge	2 Tuff Tony and CoKane defeated The BackSeat Boyz (JP Grayson and Tommy Grayson)	
18	CMLL	CMLL 93rd Anniversary Show	Cuauhtémoc, Mexico City, Mexico	Arena México	Místico (mask) defeated Averno (hair) in a Lucha de Apuestas Mask vs. Hair match	
20	Marigold	Dream Star Grand Prix (Final)	Tokyo, Japan	Korakuen Hall	Victoria Yuzuki defeated Rea Seto in the Dream Star Grand Prix final	
21	CF: DDT	Dramatic Infinity	Tokyo, Japan	Korakuen Hall	Mao (c) defeated Ilusion to retain the KO-D Openweight Championship in Ilusion's Right to Challenge Anywhere Anytime contract cash-in match	
24	JCW	Carnival of Chaos	Jeffersonville, Indiana	The ArenA	Caleb Konley (c) vs. Shane Mercer for the JCW World Heavyweight Championship	100th episode of JCW Lunacy
25	CMLL	Noche de Campeones	Cuauhtémoc, Mexico City, Mexico	Arena México	Las Valientitas (Olympia and Hera) defeated Kira and Skadi (c) to win the Mexican National Women's Tag Team Championship	
25	HOG	Windy City Warfare	Chicago, Illinois	Logan Square Auditorium	Killer Kross defeated Charles Mason	
25	GCW	Rock Bottom	Detroit, Michigan	Harpos Concert Theatre	Otis Cogar defeated Dale Patricks in a Deathmatch	
26	GCW	The Score	Cincinnati, Ohio	Twentieth Century Theatre	VNDL48 (Atticus Cogar, Otis Cogar, and Christian Napier) defeated Unsigned And Don't Care (Anakin Murphy, Gary Jay, and Aaron Williams) in a Hardcore match	
26	APC; RevPro	APC vs. RevPro	Nantes, France	Studio Jenny	Luke Jacobs and Kuro defeated Michael Oku and Mecca	
26	AEW	All Out	Hoffman Estates, Illinois	Now Arena	Will Ospreay (c) defeated Jon Moxley to retain the AEW World Championship	Featured the return of Samoa Joe, the AEW debut of Dani Luna, and the final match of Pac before his death.
26	AAA; WWE: Raw; SmackDown; NXT	Worlds Collide	Rosemont, Illinois	Allstate Arena	CM Punk, Rey Mysterio, and El Grande Americano defeated Omos, Dominik Mysterio, and JD McDonagh	Aired on tape delay on September 30.
27	NJPW	Destruction in Kobe	Kobe, Japan	World Memorial Hall	Yota Tsuji (c) defeated Hirooki Goto to retain the IWGP Heavyweight Championship	
27	NWA	Samhain: Part IV	Milwaukee, Wisconsin	Turner Hall Ballroom	"Thrillbilly" Silas Mason (c) vs. Carson Drake for the NWA Worlds Heavyweight Championship	Taping for NWA Powerrr.
27	Progress	Chapter 198: When September Ends	London, England	Electric Ballroom	Cara Noir defeated Malakai Black (c) to win the PROGRESS World Championship	
27	APC; RevPro	Live in Paris	Nantes, France	Studio Jenny	Connor Mills (c) defeated Kuro to retain the Undisputed British Heavyweight Championship	
30	AEW	A Tribute to Pac	Pittsburgh, Pennsylvania	Petersen Events Center	Death Riders (Bryan Danielson, Claudio Castagnoli, Wheeler Yuta, Daniel Garcia, and Gabe Kidd) defeated The Don Callis Family (Wardlow, Lance Archer, Mark Davis, Josh Alexander, and Jake Doyle)	Memorial event dedicated to Pac, who passed away three days prior. Aired as a special episode of Dynamite.
(c) – denotes defending champion(s)

=== October ===
Date	Promotion(s)	Event	Location	Venue	Main event	Notes
1	DEFY	All Heart	Detroit, Michigan	The Lincoln Factory	Bryan Keith (c) defeated Joshua Bishop to retain the DEFY World Championship	
2	REVOLVER	Tales from the Ring 9	Dayton, Ohio	Calumet Center at Montgomery County Fairgrounds	Oi4K (Jake Crist, Trey Miguel, and Zachary Wentz) (c) defeated Tye or Die (Ryan Matthias, Amazanga, and Rory Shield) in Scaffold Warfare to retain the Revolver Tag Team Championship	
3	CF: TJPW	Wrestle Princess VII	Tokyo, Japan	Ota City General Gymnasium	Yuki Arai (c) defeated Suzume to retain the Princess of Princess Championship	
3	GCW	The Last Frontier (The Sequel)	Anchorage, Alaska	Arctic Rec Center	Atticus Cogar defeated Vipress in a Hardcore match	
3	MLP	Northern Rising	Toronto, Ontario, Canada	Mattamy Athletic Centre at Maple Leaf Gardens	Adam Copeland defeated Steve Maclin in a Street Fight	
3	MLW	Slaughterhouse	Atlanta, Georgia	Center Stage	Killer Kross (c) vs. Místico for the MLW World Heavyweight Championship ended in a no contest	Taping for MLW Fusion.
4	Noah	N-1 Victory (Final)	Tokyp, Japan	Yoyogi National Gymnasium #2	Ozawa defeated Kaito Kiyomiya in the N-1 Victory final	
6	AEW	Grand Slam France	Paris, France	Adidas Arena	Will Ospreay (c) defeated Kazuchika Okada to retain the AEW World Championship	First AEW event to take place in France. Aired as a special episode of AEW Dynamite.
6	AEW	Grand Slam France	Paris, France	Adidas Arena	Death Riders (Claudio Castagnoli, Wheeler Yuta, Daniel Garcia, and Marina Shafir) defeated The Conglomeration (Orange Cassidy, Roderick Strong, Kyle O'Reilly, and Willow Nightingale)	Aired on October 10 as a special episode of AEW Collision.
10	WWE: Raw; SmackDown	Money in the Bank	New Orleans, Louisiana	Smoothie King Center	Penta defeated Bron Breakker, Je'Von Evans, Trick Williams, CM Punk, and Kevin Owens in the Men's Money in the Bank ladder match	First Money in the Bank to be held in October, and the first to be held after SummerSlam.
10	HOG	Salvation	NYC Arena	Queens, New York	Tommaso Ciampa defeated Charles Mason	
10	GCW	Fight Club; Night 1: The Art of War Games	Atlantic City, New Jersey	Showboat Atlantic City	VNDL48 (Atticus Cogar, Otis Cogar, Christian Napier, The Bev, and Eddie Only) defeated Team Vipress (Vipress, Bear Bronson, Anakin Murphy, Conor Claxton, and Mr. Danger) in an Art of WarGames match	
11	GCW	Fight Club; Night 2	Atlantic City, New Jersey	Showboat Atlantic City	Vipress (c) defeated Mr. Danger, Anakin Murphy, Jameson Shook, and Nick Gage in a five-way Deathmatch to retain the GCW Ultraviolent Championship	
11	TNA	Bound for Glory	Tampa, Florida	Yuengling Center	Leon Slater defeated Nic Nemeth (c) to win the TNA World Championship	Featured the TNA debuts of Shayna Baszler, Max Caster, and Erick Redbeard.
12	NJPW	King of Pro-Wrestling	Tokyo, Japan	Ryōgoku Kokugikan	Yota Tsuji (c) defeated Ryohei Oiwa to retain the IWGP Heavyweight Championship	
17	AEW	WrestleDream	Orlando, Florida	Addition Financial Arena	Will Ospreay (c) defeated Samoa Joe, Mike Bailey, Adam Copeland, Konosuke Takeshita, Kazuchika Okada, Ricochet, and Darby Allin in a Clockwork Carnage match to retain the AEW World Championship	Featured the AEW debut of Ilja Dragunov.
17	RevPro; CMLL	Fantastica Mania UK (Show 1)	Wolverhampton, England	The Hangar	El Sky Team (Místico and Máscara Dorada) defeated CPF (Danny Black and Joe Lando)	
17	RevPro; CMLL	Fantastica Mania UK (Show 2)	Wolverhampton, England	The Hangar	Michael Oku and Místico defeated Luke Jacobs and Último Guerrero	
18	Stardom	Path of Thunder	Utsunomiya, Japan	Light Cube Utsunomiya	Hanan (c) defeated Hina to retain the Wonder of Stardom Championship	
18	JCW	A Nightmare in Bergen County	Ridgefield Park, New Jersey	Ridgefield Park Knights of Columbus	Gabby Forza defeated Charles Mason (c) to win the JCW World Championship	
24	Marigold	Grand Destiny	Tokyo, Japan	Ryōgoku Kokugikan	Mayu Iwatani (Super Fly) defeated Miku Aono (World) and Victoria Yuzuki (United) in a Three-way Winner Takes All match for the Marigold World, United National and Marigold Super Fly Championship	Featured Mai Sakurai's last match in Marigold.
24	REVOLVER	Jerry Lynn Invitational	Nashville, Tennessee	The Troubadour Nashville	Trey Miguel defeated Steve Maclin in the Jerry Lynn Invitational final	
24	AAA	Héroes Inmortales	Mexico City, Mexico	Gimnasio Olímpico Juan de la Barrera	El Grande Americano (c) defeated Dominik Mysterio to retain the AAA Mega Championship	Aired as a three-week event as episodes of Lucha Libre AAA from October 24 to November 7.
25	CF: Noah	Wrestle Odyssey 2	Tokyo, Japan	Ryogoku Kokugikan	Tetsuya Naito (c) defeated Ozawa to retain the GHC Heavyweight Championship	
25	Progress	Chapter 199: Bonestorm	London, England	Electric Ballroom	Charles Crowley defeated Simon Miller, Gene Munny, Man Like DeReiss, Ricky Knight Jr., Drilla Moloney and Chris Ridgeway in a ThunderBastard match to become the #1 contender to the PROGRESS World Championship	
25	GCW	Shotzi Blackheart's Drive-in From Hell	Grindstone, Pennsylvania	Brownsville Drive-in	Shotzi Blackheart and Lio Rush defeated Janelasus (Joey Janela and Megan Bayne) in a Doorway to Hell match	
28	AEW	Fright Night	St. Louis, Missouri	Chaifetz Arena	Queen Aminata defeated Persephone (c) to win the AEW TBS Championship	Aired as a special episode of Dynamite.
28	AEW	Fright Night	St. Louis, Missouri	Chaifetz Arena	The Cut (Juice Robinson, Austin Gunn, and Colten Gunn) defeated The Conglomeration (Orange Cassidy, Roderick Strong, and Kyle O'Reilly)	Aired on tape delay on October 31 as a special episode of Collision.
29	Stardom	Crimson Nightmare	Tokyo, Japan	Ota City General Gymnasium	Suzu Suzuki (c) defeated Starlight Kid to retain the World of Stardom Championship	
31	WWE: NXT	Halloween Havoc	Orlando, Florida	WWE Performance Center	Grayson Waller (c) defeated Tony D'Angelo to retain the NXT Championship	
31	JCW	Hallowicked	Detroit, Michigan	Detroit Masonic Temple		
(c) – denotes defending champion(s)

=== November ===
Date	Promotion(s)	Event	Location	Venue	Main event	Notes
1	GWF	Legacy 31: Jahre Berlin Wrestling	Festsaal Kreuzberg	Berlin, Germany	Rotten Moodo defeated Ahura (c) to win the GWF World Championship in Moodo's Chaos Key championship match	
3	CF: DDT	Ultimate Party	Tokyo, Japan	Ryōgoku Kokugikan	Mao (c) defeated Chris Brookes by countout to retain the KO-D Openweight Championship	
3	NJPW	Power Struggle	Hiroshima, Japan	Hiroshima Sun Plaza	Gabe Kidd (c) defeated Taichi to retain the IWGP Global Heavyweight Championship	Featured the final of the Super Junior Tag League.
4	AEW	Blood & Guts	Jacksonville, Florida	VyStar Veterans Memorial Arena	The Don Callis Family (Kazuchika Okada, Kyle Fletcher, Wardlow, Kevin Knight, Mark Davis and Jake Doyle) defeated Will Ospreay, Adam Copeland, Darby Allin, Steven Borden, and The Young Bucks (Matt Jackson and Nick Jackson) by surrender in the Men's Blood and Guts match	Aired as a special episode of Dynamite.
6	GCW	Dead On Arrival	St. Louis, Missouri	Pop's Nightclub	Sicko the Clown defeated Neil Diamond Cutter	
7	GCW	The Crossroads	Indianapolis, Indiana	Fountain Square Theatre	Atticus Cogar defeated Joseph Sawyer (c) in a No Rules match to win the GCW World Championship	
7	WWE: Raw; SmackDown	Crown Jewel	Riyadh, Saudi Arabia	ANB Arena	Roman Reigns (World Heavyweight Champion) defeated Sami Zayn (Undisputed WWE Champion) to win the 2026 WWE Crown Jewel Championship	
7	AEW	Chris Jericho's Rock 'N' Wrestling Rager at Sea – Seventh Cruise of a Seventh Cruise	Miami, Florida	Norwegian Jewel	Tommaso Ciampa defeated Andrade El Ídolo (c) to win the AEW National Championship	Aired as a special episode of Collision.
7	MLW	Saturday Night SuperFight	Cicero, Illinois	Cicero Stadium	Josh Bishop defeated Killer Kross (c) in a Last Man Standing match to win the MLW World Heavyweight Championship	First MLW PPV since 2019. Featured the MLW debuts of Yota Tsuji and Tessa Blanchard.
8	MLW; CMLL	Lucha de los Muertos	Cicero, Illinois	Cicero Stadium	Josh Bishop (c) defeated Joe Coffey to retain the MLW World Heavyweight Championship	Taping for MLW Fusion.
9	NJPW	El Desperado "Gas" PE Invitational	Tokyo, Japan	Shin-Kiba 1st Ring	El Desperado and MxM Collection (Mason Madden and Mansoor) defeated Maki Itoh, Kazuki Hirata, and Cima	
14	AEW	Full Gear	Phoenix, Arizona	Mortgage Matchup Center	Will Ospreay (c) defeated Kyle Fletcher to retain the AEW World Championship	Featured the return of MJF and the debut of The Kasper Brothers (Jacob Kasper and Drew Kasper).
14	GCW	Massacre in Missoula	Missoula, Montana	Zootown Event Center	1 Called Manders defeated Marcus Mathers	First GCW PPV in Montana.
15	GCW	Bedlam in Boise	Boise, Idaho	Treefort Music Hall	Megan Bayne defeated KJ Orso	First GCW PPV in Idaho.
15	TNA	Destination X	Edmonton, Alberta, Canada	Edmonton Expo Centre	Leon Slater (c) defeated Trey Miguel to retain the TNA World Championship	First Destination X event since 2017 and first Destination X pay-per-view since 2012. Featured the TNA return of TJP.
16	NJPW; CMLL	Lucha Kingdom	Cuauhtémoc, Mexico City, Mexico	Arena México	Místico and Último Guerrero defeated Yota Tsuji and Hirooki Goto	
19	NJPW	Tanahashi Jam 2	Tokyo, Japan	Korakuen Hall	Takeshi Masada and TMDK (Zack Sabre Jr. and Kosei Fujita) vs. Kaito Kiyomiya and TMDK (Ryohei Oiwa and Hartley Jackson)	
20	NJPW	Bound for Unbound	Tokyo, Japan	Korakuen Hall	Team 250kg (Jeff Cobb and Chihiro Hashimoto) vs. Shingo Takagi and Natsupoi	
25	AEW	Thanksgiving Eve	Omaha, Nebraska	Liberty First Credit Union Arena		Airing as a special episode of Dynamite.
25	AEW	Thanksgiving Collision	Omaha, Nebraska	Liberty First Credit Union Arena		Airing on tape delay on November 26 as a special episode of Collision.
28	WWE: Raw; SmackDown	Survivor Series: WarGames	Houston, Texas	Daikin Park	The Bloodline (Roman Reigns, Jimmy Uso, Jey Uso, Solo Sikoa, and Jacob Fatu) vs. The 946 (Royce Keys, Lucien Price, Bronco Nima, Carmelo Hayes, and Cruz Montana) in the Men's WarGames match	
29	JCW	Series of Survivals	Ridgefield Park, New Jersey	Ridgefield Park Knights of Columbus		
29	Progress	Chapter 200: Vendetta 4	London, England	Electric Ballroom	Cara Noir (c) vs. Charles Crowley for the PROGRESS World Championship	
(c) – denotes defending champion(s)

=== December ===
Date	Promotion(s)	Event	Location	Venue	Main event	Notes
4	GCW		Rochester, New York	Water Street Music Hall		
4	ROH	Final Battle	San Antonio, Texas	Boeing Center at Tech Port		
9	AEW	Winter Is Coming	Monterrey, Nuevo Léon, Mexico	Arena Monterrey		Airing as a special episode of Dynamite.
9	AEW	Winter Is Coming	Monterrey, Nuevo Léon, Mexico	Arena Monterrey		Airing on tape delay on December 12 as a special episode of Collision.
12	GCW	Deck the Halls (with Light Tubes)	Hartford, Connecticut	Webster Theater		
12	WWE: Raw; SmackDown	Wrestlepalooza	Perth, Western Australia, Australia	RAC Arena		
12	WWE: NXT	TLC: Tables, Ladders & Chairs	Orlando, Florida	WWE Performance Center		First TLC: Tables, Ladders & Chairs event since 2020.
14	WWE: Raw; SmackDown; NXT	John Cena Classic	Kissimmee, Florida	AdventHealth Arena		Airing as a special episode of Raw.
15	AAA; WWE: Raw; SmackDown; NXT	Worlds Collide: Doomsday	Kissimmee, Florida	AdventHealth Arena		
19	AAA	Guerra de Titanes	Guadalajara, Jalisco, Mexico	Arena Guadalajara		
19	AEW	Worlds End	Minneapolis, Minnesota	Target Center	Will Ospreay (c) (Linear) vs. MJF (Real) to determine the undisputed AEW World Champion	
19	GCW	Highest in The Room 5	Los Angeles, California	Ukrainian Culture Center		
20	GCW	For All The Dogs	Mesa, Arizona	Nile Theater		
23	AEW	Holiday Bash	Chicago, Illinois	Wintrust Arena		Airing as a special episode of Dynamite.
23	AEW	Holiday Bash	Chicago, Illinois	Wintrust Arena		Airing on tape delay on December 26 as a special episode of Collision.
29	Stardom	Dream Queendom	Tokyo, Japan	Ryōgoku Kokugikan		
30	Progress		London, England	Electric Ballroom		
31	JCW	Til Infinity	Ridgefield Park, New Jersey	Ridgefield Park Knights of Columbus		
(c) – denotes defending champion(s)

== Notable events ==
- January 1 –
  - In the United States, the majority of WWE's archival content on Peacock was moved to Netflix, with Peacock maintaining NXT's premium live events until March 15 and the Saturday Night's Main Event specials and replays of WWE SmackDown (since October 2024) until at least 2029, as well as exclusive documentaries.
  - Many of the select few countries that were still on the WWE Network in 2025 transitioned to Netflix, with only Austria, Germany, Italy, and Switzerland still on the WWE Network until April 1, while Japan remained on Abema until October 1, with Sub-Saharan Africa remaining on SuperSport for an undisclosed period of time.
- January 2 – WWE SmackDown returned to three hours after airing for two hours since July 4, 2025.
- January 4 –
  - At New Japan Pro-Wrestling's Wrestle Kingdom 20, IWGP Global Heavyweight Champion Yota Tsuji defeated IWGP World Heavyweight Champion Konosuke Takeshita in a Winner Takes All match. Subsequently, Tsuji reintroduced the IWGP Heavyweight Championship—which had been retired in 2021 and succeeded by the World Heavyweight—to replace the World Heavyweight, retroactively merging the lineages of both titles as one, with all former IWGP World Heavyweight Champions recognized as former IWGP Heavyweight Champions. The IWGP Intercontinental Championship history—which had been unified with the Heavyweight in 2021 and also retired to create the World Heavyweight—would also later be amended with all former World Heavyweight Champions also recognized as former Intercontinental Champions, with Tsuji recognized as its final holder.
  - Also at Wrestle Kingdom 20, Hiroshi Tanahashi lost to Kazuchika Okada, ending his 25-year professional wrestling career.
- January 6 – Backstage during New Japan Pro-Wrestling's New Year Dash, Yota Tsuji announced that Bullet Club would be dissolved going forward, marking the end of the stable after 12 years.
- January 8 – WWE Main Event premiered on YouTube in the United States, after streaming on Peacock since 2021.
- January 15 – TNA iMPACT! premiered on AMC and AMC+, after airing on AXS TV since October 2019, TNA+ since January 2024, and New England Sports Network since January 2025.
- January 31 – At WWE's Royal Rumble, AJ Styles lost to Gunther via technical submission, ending his 27-year professional wrestling career.
- March 9 – Outside of the United States and Canada, All Elite Wrestling (AEW), in partnership with Kiswe, launched MyAEW, an over-the-top streaming service and digital television network, hosting all episodes of AEW's programs and all pay-per-view (PPV) events, live and on-demand, as well as hosting the archive for all prior programs and PPVs. It also hosts the archive for Ring of Honor.
- March 15 – In the United States, NXT's premium live events (PLE) were removed from Peacock following the expiration of that portion of WWE's contract with NBCUniversal. NXT's next PLE, Stand & Deliver, aired on YouTube on April 4, with NXT's PLEs subsequently going to The CW starting with The Great American Bash on June 28 and then simulcast on ESPN Unlimited beginning August 4.
- March 31 – The New Japan Pro-Wrestling Board of Directors transferred all shares of World Wonder Ring Stardom, which had operated under the trade name Stardom Co., Ltd. since their acquisition in April 2024, back to their parent company Bushiroad.
- April 1 – The standalone WWE Network permanently shut down in its last four remaining countries—Austria, Germany, Italy, and Switzerland—which transitioned to Netflix, bringing a complete end to the service after 12 years.
- April 28 – WWE announced that beginning with NXT The Great American Bash on June 28, NXT's premium live events (PLE) would begin airing on The CW's linear channel in the United States under a multi-year agreement that includes 20 NXT PLEs. The CW channel had already been airing the weekly NXT program since October 2024.
- April 29 – In the United States, ESPN revealed a deal with The CW that would include WWE's premium live events for NXT and the weekly NXT program, with these events simulcast on The CW's linear channel and ESPN Unlimited, later confirmed to begin on August 4.
- May 1 – NWA Powerrr premiered on Comet, after airing on The Roku Channel since July 2025. This put the National Wrestling Alliance (NWA) back on over-the-air television for the first time in over 30 years.
- May 26 –
  - Nicola Glencross and Damian Mackle (best known as Nikki Cross and Killian Dain in WWE, respectively) purchased both Progress Wrestling and DEFY Wrestling.
  - Major League Wrestling (MLW) announced a partnership with Veeps to stream MLW's relaunched weekly series, Fusion, starting May 30, as well as quarterly pay-per-view events, on the platform, with Fusion also available on YouTube.
- May 27 – Bushiroad transferred all shares of New Japan Pro-Wrestling to a consortium between TV Asahi and CyberAgent, after the promotion had been a consolidated subsidiary of the company since 2012.
- May 30 – At Lucha Libre AAA Worldwide's Noche de Los Grandes, El Grande Americano defeated "The Original" El Grande Americano in a No Disqualification Mask vs. Mask match, with "The Original" El Grande Americano revealed to be Chad Gable.
- June 24 – The National Wrestling Alliance (NWA) announced a partnership with Tubi to stream NWA Powerrr.
- June 28 – In the United States, WWE's premium live events (PLE) for NXT began airing on The CW's linear channel, starting with that night's The Great American Bash. NXT's PLEs were previously streamed on Peacock until March, with one event streamed on YouTube in April. Outside the US, NXT's PLEs remained on SuperSport in Sub-Saharan Africa, Abema in Japan until October 1, which then transferred to Netflix, and Netflix everywhere else.
- July 3 – WWE SmackDown returned to two hours after airing for three hours since January 2.
- July 15 – Maple Leaf Pro Wrestling's weekly series, Mayhem, premiered on TSN2.
- August 4 – WWE's premium live events for NXT as well as the weekly NXT program began simulcasting on The CW's linear channel and ESPN Unlimited.
- August 27 – DEFY Wrestling founders Matt Farmer and Jim Perry bought back the promotion.
- August 30 – At NXT Heatwave, the WWE Women's Speed Championship was retired after it was unified with the NXT Women's North American Championship. Women's North American Champion Zaria defeated Women's Speed Champion Wren Sinclair and Kali Armstrong in a Winner Takes All triple threat match to unify the titles, with Sinclair recognized as the final champion.
- September 1 – On WWE NXT, the men's WWE Speed Championship was retired after NXT General Manager Robert Stone had Lexis King relinquish the title.
- September 11 – During Night 4 of WWE's South America Live Tour, Stephanie Vaquer defeated Liv Morgan to win the Women's World Championship, marking the first time a WWE championship changed hands on a house show since December 2019 when Andrade defeated Rey Mysterio to win the WWE United States Championship. It was also the first time a WWE world championship changed hands at a house show since April 2007 when Mickie James won the original WWE Women's Championship off Melina, who won the title back in an immediate rematch.
- September 15 – On WWE NXT, NXT General Manager Robert Stone announced the return of the Dusty Rhodes Tag Team Classic for the first time since 2024.
- September 17 – MLW Fusion premiered on Tubi.
- September 27 – Benjamin Satterley, known as Pac in All Elite Wrestling (AEW) and Adrian Neville (later simply Neville) in WWE, passed away at the age of 40, one day after competing in an AEW National Championship match against Andrade El Ídolo at AEW All Out.
- October 1 – In Japan, WWE's content moved to Netflix, after being on Abema since October 2023.
- October 13 – MLW Fusion's archive was added to Amazon Prime Video, allowing fans to purchase previous individual episodes or full seasons.
- October 14 – WWE Main Event premiered on Rumble in the United States, after streaming on YouTube since January 8.
- November 6 – New Japan Pro-Wrestling (NJPW) announced its subsidiary, NJPW of American, Inc., would cease operations and enter liquidation. Hours later, it announced the closing of the NJPW Academy in Carson, California.

== Accomplishments and tournaments ==
=== AAA ===
Accomplishment	Winner(s)	Date	Notes
Rey de Reyes	El Grande Americano	March 14	Defeated La Parka, "The Original" El Grande Americano, and Santos Escobar in the final to earn the Rey de Reyes Sword and a AAA Mega Championship match. He defeated Dominik Mysterio in a No Disqualification match on Night 2 of Triplemanía 34 to win the title.
AAA Latin American Championship Tournament	La Parka	August 30	Defeated Damian Priest, El Fiscal, and El Hijo de Dr. Wagner Jr. in the finals, which was contested as a fatal four-way match, to win the vacant championship.
Copa Bardahl	Omos	September 11	Last eliminated Niño Hamburguesa to win the Copa Bardahl Trophy.
Rey Fénix World Cruiserweight Tournament	TBD	December 19	Twelve-man single-elimination tournament for a AAA World Cruiserweight Championship match at the January 2, 2027 Lucha Libre AAA taping.

=== AAW ===
Accomplishment	Winner(s)	Date	Notes
Chi-Town Rumble	Joe Alonzo	February 21 (aired February 26)	Last eliminated Gringo Loco to earn an AAW Heavyweight Championship match. He defeated Rafael Quintaro to win the title at Homecoming.

=== AEW ===
Accomplishment	Winner(s)	Date	Notes
Blackjack Battle Royal	Jack Perry	March 15	Last eliminated AEW National Champion Ricochet to win the title.
Dynasty Casino Gauntlet match	Kevin Knight	April 12	Pinned Daniel Garcia to win the vacant AEW TNT Championship.
Owen Hart Cup (Women)	Mercedes Moné	June 28	Defeated Maya World in the final to win the Owen Hart Cup Trophy, Championship, and earn an AEW Women's World Championship match at All In. She defeated Willow Nightingale for the title at the event
Owen Hart Cup (Men)	Will Ospreay	June 28	Defeated Swerve Strickland in the final to win the Owen Hart Cup Trophy, Championship, and earn an AEW World Championship match at All In. He defeated Kenny Omega for the title at the event.
Survival of the Fittest	Hikaru Shida	July 1	Last eliminated Kris Statlander in the final to win the vacant AEW TBS Championship.
Beach Break Casino Gauntlet match	Willow Nightingale	July 8	Pinned Julia Hart to earn an AEW Women's World Championship match at Redemption. She defeated Thekla to win the title at the event.
Trios Roulette Royale	Swerve Strickland and The New Level (Austin Creed and Kofi)	August 30	Last eliminated Pac and Claudio Castagnoli of the Death Riders to win the AEW World Trios Championship. The titles were previously held by "Hangman" Adam Page and Brodido (Brody King and Bandido).
Continental Challenge Cup	Jon Moxley	August 30	Defeated Nigel McGuiness in the final to win the AEW Continental Challenge Cup Trophy and retain the AEW Continental Championship.
All In Casino Gauntlet match	Andrade El Ídolo	August 30	Pinned Nick Wayne to earn an AEW World Championship match contract.
"The Butcher" Battle Royale	Daniel Garcia	September 12	Last eliminated Josh Alexander to win $100,000 to donate to the charity of his choice in Andy Williams' name. Garcia chose to donate the money to MusiCares.
Clockwork Carnage match	Will Ospreay	October 17	Defeated Darby Allin, Samoa Joe, Adam Copeland, Kazuchika Okada, Ricochet, Mike Bailey, and Konosuke Takeshita to retain the AEW World Championship.
Continental Classic	TBD	December 19	Twelve-man round-robin tournament for the AEW Continental Championship.

=== AIW ===
Accomplishment	Winner(s)	Date	Notes
Gauntlet for the Gold	Chuck Stone and Eric Taylor	March 20	Both men were declared co-winners after last eliminating each other. As such, both earned an opportunity at the AIW Absolute Championship. They challenged Sam Holloway for the title in a five-way match at Absolution XIX, also involving Wes Barkley and Mikey Montgomery; Barkley would win the title.

=== AJPW ===
Accomplishment	Winner(s)	Date	Notes
Zennichi Jr. Tag Team Festival	Atsuki Aoyagi and Rising Hayato	March 20	Defeated Ryo Inoue and Mochizuki Jr. in the final to earn an All Asia Tag Team Championship match. They defeated Gajadokuro (Ishin and Yoshiki Kato) to win the titles on the sixth night of the Super Power Series tour.
Champion Carnival	Hideki Suzuki	May 17	Defeated Go Shiozaki in the final to earn a Triple Crown Heavyweight Championship match. He challenged Kento Miyahara for the title on the sixth night of the Super Power Series tour but was unsuccessful.
Zennichi Jr. Festival	Seiki Yoshioka	August 29	Defeated Dan Tamura in the final to earn a World Junior Heavyweight Championship match. He challenged Tamura for the title on the first night of the Raising an Army Memorial Series tour but was unsuccessful.
Royal Road Tournament	Ryuki Honda	September 22	Defeated Yuma Aoyagi in the final to earn a Triple Crown Heavyweight Championship match. He challenged Kento Miyahara for the title on the fifth night of the Raising an Army Memorial Series tour but was unsuccessful.
Real World Tag League	TBD	December 6	12-team round-robin tournament for a future World Tag Team Championship match.

=== Basara ===
Accomplishment	Winner(s)	Date	Notes
Universe Cup	Naomichi Marufuji	April 6	Defeated Sanshiro Takagi in the final to win.
Union Max Championship Next Challenger Decision Tournament	Takumi Tsukamoto	June 23 (aired June 27)	Defeated Lil Kraken in the final to earn a Union Max Championship match. He defeated Daiki Shimomura to win the title at Basara 314.
Iron Fist Tag Tournament	Daiki Shimomura and Shuichiro Katsumura	October 12	Defeated Lil Kraken and Sagat in the tournament final.

=== CF ===
Accomplishment	Winner(s)	Date	Notes
Universe Cup	Naomichi Marufuji	April 6	Defeated Sanshiro Takagi in the final to win.

==== DDT ====
Accomplishment	Winner(s)	Date	Notes
Imaike Rumble	Naomi Yoshimura	February 7	Last eliminated Yoshihiko to win.
D Generations Cup	Kazuma Sumi	February 22	Defeated Takeshi Masada in the final to earn a DDT Universal Championship match. He defeated Daisuke Sasaki to win the title at Judgement.
King of DDT Tournament	Shinya Aoki	May 31	Defeated Mao in the final to earn a KO-D Openweight Championship match. He challenged Yuki Ueno for the title at King of Kings but was unsuccessful.

==== Noah ====
Accomplishment	Winner(s)	Date	Notes
Jr. Tag League	Dragon Bane and Alejandro	March 1	Defeated Team 2000X (Alpha Wolf and Kai Fujimura) in the final to earn a GHC Junior Heavyweight Tag Team Championship match. They defeated Los Intocables (Daga and Daiki Odashima) to win the titles at Apex Conquest.
Neo Global Tag League	Jōnetsu Max (Manabu Soya and Yuki Iino)	June 16	Defeated The Good Brothers (Doc Gallows and Karl Anderson) in the final to earn a GHC Tag Team Championship match. Defeated Los Tranquillos de Japon (Tetsuya Naito and Bushi) on Night 2 of Legacy Rise to win the titles.
GHC 200 Championship Tournament	Hayata	August 10	Defeated Tetsuya Endo in the final to become the inaugural champion.
N-1 Victory	Ozawa	October 4	Defeated Kaito Kiyomiya in the final to earn a GHC Heavyweight Championship match. He challenged Tetsuya Naito for the title at Wrestle Odyssey 2 but was unsuccessful.
Jr. Grand Prix	TBD	November 28	16-man single-elimination tournament for a future GHC Junior Heavyweight Championship match.

==== TJPW ====
Accomplishment	Winner(s)	Date	Notes
"Futari wa Princess" Max Heart Tournament	Ober Eats (Wakana Uehara and Yuki Kamifuku)	February 13	Defeated Mizuki and Uta Takami in the final to win. Ober Eats became the first team to win the tournament while holding the Princess Tag Team Championship.
Tokyo Princess Cup	Suzume	August 23	Defeated Rika Tatsumi in the final to earn a Princess of Princess Championship match at Wrestle Princess VII. She challenged Yuki Arai for the title at the event but was unsuccessful.
Unlimited Princess Championship Battle Royal	TBD	December 26	Multi-woman battle royal to determine the inaugural Unlimited Princess Champion.

=== CMLL ===
Accomplishment	Winner(s)	Date	Notes
Reyes del Aire	Flip Gordon	February 3	Last eliminated Yutani in a torneo cibernetico to win the tournament.
Fantastica Mania Tag Team Tournament	El Sky Team (Místico and Máscara Dorada)	February 24	Defeated Averno and Magnus in the final to win.
Torneo de Escuelas	Escuela Magia Blanca (Tornado and Rey Pegasus)	February 27	Defeated Escuela Querétaro (Pantera Jr. and Psycotic) and Escuela Último Guerrero (Estudiante Jr. and Feroz) in the final to win.
Copa Irma González	La Magnífica	March 6	Defeated Princesa Sugehit and Marcela to win.
Copa 70. Aniversario de la Arena México de Amazonas	Keyra, Olympia, Reyna Isis, and Zeuxis	April 24	Defeated Tessa Blanchard, India Sioux, and Las Chicas Indomables (La Jarochita and Lluvia) in a torneo cibernetico to win.
Copa 70. Aniversario de la Arena México	Ángel de Oro, Último Guerrero, and El Sky Team (Místico and Neón)	April 24	Defeated The Don Callis Family (El Clon, Mark Davis, Rocky Romero, and Volador Jr.) in a torneo cibernetico to win.
CMLL Universal Championship	Máscara Dorada	April 24	Defeated Hechicero and Black Tiger in the final to win.
Torneo Embajador de los Niños	Fuego	April 26	Last eliminated El Hijo del Pantera to win.
La Copa Junior	Villano III Jr.	May 29	Defeated Zandokan Jr. in the final to win.
Copa Dinastías de Madres	Tessa Blanchard	June 21	Defeated Lluvia in the final to win.
Copa Dinastías de Hermanos	Los Villanos (El Hijo de Villano III and Villano III Jr.)	June 21	Defeated El Hijo del Pantera and Pantera Jr. in the final to win.
Copa Dinastías de Padres	Euforia	June 21	Defeated Valiente in the final to win.
Copa Dinastías de Herederos	Zandokan Jr.	June 21	Defeated Averno in the final to win
CMLL Arena Puebla Tag Team Championship Eliminator Tournament	Meyer and Tiger Boy	July 13	Defeated Konjuro and Rey Espartano in the final to become the inaugural champions.
Copa 73 Aniversario Arena Puebla	Soberano Jr.	July 20	Defeated Esfinge, Máscara Dorada, and Volador Jr. to win
Leyenda de Plata	Máscara Dorada	July 31	Defeated Komander in the final to win.
International Gran Prix	Hechicero	August 7	Last eliminated Claudio Castagnoli in a torneo cibernético to win the International Gran Prix Trophy.
Copa Viva México	Starlight Kid	September 14	Last eliminated Olympia in a torneo cibernético to win.
Copa Independencia	Tessa Blanchard	September 16	Last eliminated Starlight Kid in a torneo cibernético to win.
Copa Búho	Búho Jr.	October 11	Defeated Discordia, Rey Dragón, Roco Vann, and Símbolo Azteca to win.
CMLL Universal Amazons Championship	Olympia	October 16	Defeated Skadi in the final to win.
International Amazons Gran Prix	Skadi	October 23	Last eliminated Megan Bayne in a torneo cibernético to win the International Gran Prix Trophy.
Rey del Inframundo	Xelhua	October 30	Defeated defending champion Guerrero Maya Jr., Calavera Jr. I, and Ráfaga Jr. in the four-way elimination match final to win.
Copa Tzompantli	Persephone	November 1	Defeated La Magnífica, Princesa Sugehit, and Reyna Isis in a four-way elimination match to win.
Torneo de Tercias	Neón, Alexius, and Pendulo	November 8	Defeated Bárbaro Cavernario, Feroz, and Troglodita in the final to win.
Copa Alto Voltaje	Máscara Dorada	November 15	Defeated Soberano Jr. and Yutani in the final to win.
Copa Mujeres Revolucionarias	Princesa Sugehit	November 16	Last eliminated Lluvia in a torneo cibernético to win .

=== The Crash ===
Accomplishment	Winner(s)	Date	Notes
Copa Rey del Aire	Anubis	July 10	Defeated El Enviado, Mosco Jr., Resplandor, Sonik, and Vengador to win.
Copa XV Aniversario	L. A. Park	November 6	Last eliminated Valentino in a torneo cibernético to win.

=== CZW ===
Accomplishment	Winner(s)	Date	Notes
Tournament of Death 23	Joe Dred	September 6	Defeated Bear Bronson in the final to win.
Tournament of Death UK	Jack Harrop	September 27	Defeated Joe Dred in the final to win.
CZW World Tag Team Championship Tournament	EN Bush and Samwell Thompson or TBD	TBD	Single-elimination tournament for the vacant titles.

=== DG ===
Accomplishment	Winner(s)	Date	Notes
Open the Dream Gate Championship #1 Contender's Battle Royal	Kai	March 13	Last eliminated Madoka Kikuta to earn an Open the Dream Gate Championship match. He challenged Kikuta for the title on the third night of The Gate of Passion tour but was unsuccessful.
Rey de Parejas	El Cielo and Luis Mante	September 3	Defeated Kota Minoura and Yuki Yoshioka in the final to earn a Open the Twin Gate Championship match. They challenged Gajadokuro (Ishin and Yoshiki Kato) for the titles at Tokio Infinity HPA but were unsuccessful.
Open the Brave Gate Championship Tournament	Homare	November 5	Defeated Dragon Kid in the final to win the vacant title.

=== Diana ===
Accomplishment	Winner(s)	Date	Notes
Orihime Tournament	Cory Zero	July 12	Defeated Lauriana in the final to win.

=== EVE ===
Accomplishment	Winner(s)	Date	Notes
SHE-1	Session Moth Martina	January 9	Defeated Anita Vaughn in the final to earn a Pro-Wrestling: EVE Championship match. She defeated Rhio to win the title, which was renamed the Pro-Wrestling: EVE World Championship, at EVE 146: Wrestle Queendom VIII.
Multiverse Rumble	Alexxis Falcon	February 6	Cosplayed as Mr. Bean; last eliminated Nina Samuels, cosplaying as Ivory, to win.
Sudden Death 16	Alexxis Falcon	March 8	Pinned Charlie Morgan to earn a championship opportunity of her choice. She challenged Session Moth Martina for the Pro-Wrestling: EVE World Championship at EVE 150: History Makers/Rule Breakers! but was unsuccessful.
Pro-Wrestling: EVE International Championship #1 Contender's Tournament	Miyu Yamashita	April 25	Defeated Shoko Nakajima in the final to earn an Pro-Wrestling: EVE International Championship match. She defeated Kris Statlander to win the title at EVE 150: History Makers/Rule Breakers!.
Clockwork Carnage match	Kay Lee Ray	October 2	Defeated Rhio, Alexxis Falcon, Emersyn Jayne, Hollie Barlow, Lucy Deathmatch, Molly Spartan, and Skye Smitson to earn a future Pro-Wrestling: EVE World Championship match.

=== Freedoms ===
Accomplishment	Winner(s)	Date	Notes
King of Freedom World Tag Team Championship Next Challenger Tournament	Daiju Wakamatsu and Takashi Sasaki	March 11	Defeated Kyu Mogami and Hyakuroku in the final to earn a King of Freedom World Tag Team Championship match. They challenged Jun Kasai and Mizuki Watase for the titles at The Gekokujo but were unsuccessful.
Junior Freedom Tournament	Kengo	November 13	Defeated Kota Sekifuda in the final to earn a future King of Freedom World Junior Heavyweight Championship match.

=== GanPro ===
Accomplishment	Winner(s)	Date	Notes
Universe Cup	Naomichi Marufuji	April 6	Defeated Sanshiro Takagi in the final to win.

=== GCW ===
Accomplishment	Winner(s)	Date	Notes
Jersey J-Cup	Charles Mason	February 7	Defeated JCW World Champion Billie Starkz in the final to win the title.
Grab the Brass Ring Doors, Ladders, and Chairs match	1 Called Manders	April 17	Defeated Bear Bronson, Charles Mason, Gringo Loco, Man Like DeReiss, Masato Tanaka, Shotzi Blackheart, Sidney Akeem, Terry Yaki, Vengador, and Vipress to earn a GCW World Championship match. He challenged Charles Mason for the title at Ring of Dreams but was unsuccessful.
Clusterfuck Battle Royal	Shotzi Blackheart	April 18	Last eliminated Slade to win.
Tournament of Survival 11	Masashi Takeda	June 6	Defeated Mr. Danger in the final to win.

=== Gleat ===
Accomplishment	Winner(s)	Date	Notes
G-Class	T-Hawk	June 4	Defeated Kaito Ishida in the final to earn a G-Rex Championship match. He challenged El Lindaman for the title at the Gleat 5th Anniversary Event but was unsuccessful.

=== GWF ===
Accomplishment	Winner(s)	Date	Notes
World Cup	Kouga	May 10	Defeated Arez, Metehan, and Rambo in a four-way elimination final to earn a GWF World Championship match. He challenged Ahura for the title at Summer Smash but was unsuccessful.
Battlefield match	Pascal Spalter	September 6	Last eliminated Shaqiri to earn a GWF World Championship match. He challenged Ahura for the title at Legacy 31: Jahre Berlin Wrestling but was unsuccessful.

=== HOG ===
Accomplishment	Winner(s)	Date	Notes
Matt Travis Memorial Battle Royal	Joey Silver	August 7	Last eliminated Kuro to earn a contract for an HOG Heavyweight Championship match. He cashed in the contract later that night to defeat Charles Mason to win the title.

=== Ice Ribbon ===
Accomplishment	Winner(s)	Date	Notes
Kizuna Tournament	Kirari Wakana and Yuuka	April 12	Defeated Akane Fujita and Arisa Shinose in the final to earn an International Ribbon Tag Team Championship match. They challenged Makoto and Sumika Yanagawa for the titles on April 26 but were unsuccessful.

=== IWRG ===
Accomplishment	Winner(s)	Date	Notes
El Protector	Aguila Oriental and Hell Boy	February 22	Last eliminated Chessman and Principe in a torneo cibernetico to win.
Tryout Tournament	Falcon Fire	March 29	Defeated Aztec Fly and Madness in the final by judge's decision.
Guerra del Golfo	Hell Boy	April 19	Defeated Vito Fratelli in the final, which was contested as a Hair vs. Hair match.
Rey del Ring	Jack Morris and Vito Fratelli	May 31	Both men last pinned each other. As a result, both challenged Hell Boy for the IWRG Rey del Ring Championship on June 7 in a three-way match, which was won by Fratelli.
Copa de Lucha Libre	Caballero de Plata	June 21	Won the torneo cibernetico by default after Travis Banks suffered an injury.
La Jaulas de Las Locas	Jessy Ventura	July 12	Pinned Princeso in a mask vs. hair six-way match to win. Per the stipulation, Princeso was forced to unmask.
Copa IWRG Retro	Cerebro Negro	August 16	Defeated Bombero Infernal, Veneno, Fantasy, Panterita, and Comando Negro Jr. in a six-way elimination match to win.
Torneo Fill 132	Cronick	September 20	Last eliminated Fly in a torneo cibernetico to win.
IWRG Intercontinental Tag Team Championship Tournament	Jack Morris and Tirano	October 8	Defeated Mexa Boy's (Águila Oriental and Noisy Boy) in the final to win the vacant titles.
La Jaulas de Las Locas	Candy Swing	October 11	Pinned Barbie Boy in a mask vs. hair six-way match to win. Per the stipulation, Princeso was forced to shave his head.
Torneo Fill 133	Fly	October 18	Last eliminated Cronick in a mask vs. hair torneo cibernetico to win. Per the stipulation, Princeso was forced to unmask.
IWRG Junior de Juniors Championship Tournament	Hijo de Silver King	October 22	Defeated El Hijo de Canis Lupus in the final to win the vacant title.
Copa de los Condenados	Toki	October 30	Last eliminated Principe Centauro in a battle royal to win.
El Castillo del Terror	Revolución Crew (El Hijo de Canis Lupus, Multifacetico Jr., and Rey Mictlán)	October 30	Multifacetico Jr. pinned Rokambole of Dinastía Imperial in a sixteen-man tag team mask vs. hair steel cage match to win. Per the stipulation, Rokambole was forced to unmask.
Copa IWRG Internacional	Axel Rico	November 8	Pinned Falcon Fire in a torneo cibernetico to win for Team International.

=== JTO ===
Accomplishment	Winner(s)	Date	Notes
JTO Girls Tournament	Big Haruka	February 14	Defeated Mizuha in the final to win.
JTO Tournament	Ibuki	February 15	Defeated Bomber Tatsuya in the final to win.
King of JTO Championship Tournament	Yukimitsu Takahashi	August 11	Defeated Ryuya Takekura in the final to win the vacant title.

=== M-Pro ===
Accomplishment	Winner(s)	Date	Notes
Universe Cup	Naomichi Marufuji	April 6	Defeated Sanshiro Takagi in the final to win.
Tohoku Junior Heavyweight Championship #1 Contender's Battle Royal	Ringo Yamaya	August 15	Last eliminated Yapper Man 1 to earn a Tohoku Junior Heavyweight Championship match. He will challenge Sangre Azteca Jr. for the title on September 12.

=== Marigold ===
Accomplishment	Winner(s)	Date	Notes
Marigold 3D Trios Championship Tournament	Mai Sakurai, Natsumi Showzuki, and Erina Yamanaka	February 23	Defeated Darkness Revolution (Misa Matsui, Nagisa Nozaki, and Rea Seto) in the final to become the inaugural Marigold 3D Trios Champions.
Dream Star Grand Prix	Victoria Yuzuki	September 20	Defeated Rea Seto in the finals of a 24-woman round-robin tournament for a Marigold World Championship match.

=== MLP ===
Accomplishment	Winner(s)	Date	Notes
Interim MLP Canadian Championship Elimination Gauntlet match	Stu Grayson	March 28	Last eliminated Jonathan Gresham to become the interim MLP Canadian Champion.

=== MLW ===
Accomplishment	Winner(s)	Date	Notes
Battle Riot	Killer Kross	January 29 (aired February 5)	Last eliminated Alex Hammerstone and Matt Riddle to win the MLW World Heavyweight Championship. The title was previously held by Mads Krule Krügger.
Opera Cup	Austin Aries	September 12 (airing TBC)	Defeated Matt Riddle in the final to win the Opera Cup Trophy and earn an MLW World Heavyweight Championship match.

=== NJPW ===
Accomplishment	Winner(s)	Date	Notes
Tornado Ranbo	TMDK (Zack Sabre Jr., Ryohei Oiwa, and Hartley Jackson)	January 4	Last eliminated Boltin Oleg and Bishamon (Hirooki Goto and Yoshi-Hashi) to win the NEVER Openweight 6-Man Tag Team Championship. The titles were previously held by Toru Yano and Spiritech (Master Wato and Yoh).
Young Lion Cup	Katsuya Murashima	February 1	Defeated Shoma Kato in the final and chose CMLL as the company he wanted to go on excursion to.
Fantastica Mania Tag Team Tournament	El Sky Team (Místico and Máscara Dorada)	February 24	Defeated Averno and Magnus in the final to win.
New Japan Cup	Callum Newman	March 21	Defeated Yuya Uemura in the final to earn an IWGP Heavyweight Championship match at Sakura Genesis. He defeated Yota Tsuji at the event to win the IWGP Heavyweight Championship
Best of the Super Juniors	Yoh	June 7	Defeated Kosei Fujita in the final to earn an IWGP Junior Heavyweight Championship match at Dominion 6.14 in Osaka-jo Hall. He defeated Douki at the event to win the title.
G1 Climax	Ryohei Oiwa	August 16	Defeated Yuya Uemura in the final to earn an IWGP Heavyweight Championship match. He challenged Yota Tsuji for the title at King of Pro-Wrestling, but was unsuccessful.
Super Junior Tag League	Unbound Co. (Taiji Ishimori and Robbie X)	November 3	Defeated Ichiban Sweet Boys (Robbie Eagles and Kosei Fujita) in the final to earn an IWGP Junior Heavyweight Tag Team Championship match at Wrestle Kingdom 21. They will face Ichiban Sweet Boys and Místico and a mystery partner in a three-way tag team match at the event for the vacant titles.
World Tag League	TBD	TBD	Multi-team round-robin tournament for an IWGP Tag Team Championship match at Wrestle Kingdom 21.

=== NWA ===
Accomplishment	Winner(s)	Date	Notes
Burke Invitation Gauntlet	Tiffany Nieves	April 4 (aired May 9)	Forced Gretta to eliminate herself to earn an NWA World Women's Championship match at the time and place of her choosing. She invoked her opportunity later that night, which aired on May 16, to defeat Natalia Markova for the title.
Crockett Cup	Titans of Calamity (Ren Ayabe and Talos)	April 4 (aired May 23)	Defeated The Country Gentlemen (AJ Cazana and KC Cazana) in the final to win the Crockett Cup Trophy and a future NWA World Tag Team Championship match.

=== Osaka Pro ===
Accomplishment	Winner(s)	Date	Notes
Osaka Tag Festival	VerteX (Suzaku and Tiiida)	February 23 (aired February 25)	Defeated Rogue Nation (Toru and Yasutaka Oosera) in the final to earn an Osaka Tag Team Championship match. They challenged Aran Sano and Tigers Mask for the titles on the March 8 Bushi-Do, which was streamed the following day, but were unsuccessful.
Osaka Light Heavyweight Tournament	Suzaku	May 24	Defeated Sho Mizuno in the final to earn an Osaka Light Heavyweight Championship match. He defeated Ultimate Spider Jr. to win the title at Summer Battle.

=== OVW ===
Accomplishment	Winner(s)	Date	Notes
Nightmare Rumble (Women)	Lovely Miss Larkan	January 11	Last eliminated "HollyHood" Haley J to earn the Key of Opportunity for a championship match at the time and place of her choosing. She invoked her opportunity to challenge Leela Feist for the OVW Women's Championship on the March 5 episode of OVW TV, which ended in a no contest.
Nightmare Rumble (Men)	Tony Evans	January 11	Last eliminated Kash Daniel to earn the Key of Opportunity for a championship match at the time and place of his choosing. He invoked his opportunity to win the OVW United States Heavyweight Championship from Dr. Zo on the February 5 episode of OVW TV.
OVW Tag Team Championship #1 Contender's Tournament	Los Desafios (Jota Peso and Maximo Suave)	February 12	Defeated Z Force (Super Z and Dayami) in the final to earn an OVW Tag Team Championship match. They defeated Donovan Cecil and Jack Vaughn at Tough Love to win the titles.
Hateful Eight Gauntlet match	Star Rider	March 15	Last eliminated Erik Surge to earn an OVW United States Heavyweight Championship match. He challenged Tony Evans for the title at Double Crossed, but their match ended in a no contest.
Trios Gauntlet match	Stephen Steel	March 19	Last eliminated Kal Herro to earn an OVW Heavyweight Championship match. He challenged Dustin Jackson for the title at Double Crossed but was unsuccessful.
OVW Media Championship #1 Contender's Gauntlet match	Meto	June 11	Last eliminated Ashton Adonis to earn an OVW Media Championship match. He challenged Drew Hernandez for the title on the July 9 episode of OVW TV but was unsuccessful.
OVW Media Championship Tournament	Drew Hernandez	June 11	Defeated Colby Carter in the final to win the vacant title.
OVW Women's Championship Tournament	Lovely Miss Larkan	June 11	Defeated Shalonce Royal in the final to win the vacant title.
OVW Women's Championship #1 Contender's Rumble	J-Rod	July 16	Last eliminated Shalonce Royal to earn an OVW Women's Championship match. She defeated Lovely Miss Larkan to win the title at Independence Rage.
Race for the Crown (Women)	Shalonce Royal	August 15	Defeated Leela Hall and Killah Kai in the final, which was contested as a ladder match, to win.
Race for the Crown (Men)	Dustin Jackson	August 15	Defeated Kal Herro in the final, which was contested as a ladder match, to win.

=== Oz Academy ===
Accomplishment	Winner(s)	Date	Notes
Magiten Tournament	Hiroyo Matsumoto	January 4	Defeated Kakeru in the final to earn an Oz Academy Openweight Championship match on February 8. She defeated Saori Anou for the title at the event.
Oz Academy Pioneer 3-Way Championship Tournament	Ryo Mizunami	April 26	Defeated Rina Yamashita and Rin to win the vacant Oz Academy Pioneer 3-Way Championship.

=== Progress ===
Accomplishment	Winner(s)	Date	Notes
Super Strong Style 16 (Women)	Rhio	May 4	Defeated Gisele Shaw in the final to earn a Progress World Women's Championship match. She defeated Alexxis Falcon to win the title at Chapter 196: Scorchio.
Super Strong Style 16 (Men)	Charles Crowley	May 4	Defeated Charlie Sterling in the final to earn a Progress World Championship match. He challenged Cara Noir for the title at Chapter 196: Scorchio but was unsuccessful.

=== REVOLVER ===
Accomplishment	Winner(s)	Date	Notes
Golden Ticket match	Damian Chambers	August 15	Won a scramble match to earn the "Golden Ticket" for a championship match at the time and place of his choosing. He cashed in his ticket later in the night to enter the Cage of Horrors match for the Revolver World Championship between champion Mance Warner, Krule, and Alex Colon. Chambers pinned Colon to win the title.
Jerry Lynn Invitational	Trey Miguel	October 24	Defeated Steve Maclin in the final.

=== RevPro ===
Accomplishment	Winner(s)	Date	Notes
Women's Revolution Gauntlet	Alexxis Falcon	March 1	Pinned Mercedes Blaze to earn a match against Mercedes Moné at High Stakes. She defeated Moné at the event in a Winner Takes All match to win the Bodyslam Women's Championship and the DW Scottish Women's Championship.
Revolution Road	JJ Gale	May 3	Defeated TK Cooper in the final to earn an Undisputed British Heavyweight Championship match at Revolution Rumble. He challenged Jay Joshua for the title at the event but was unsuccessful.
Revolution Rumble	Connor Mills	May 17	Last eliminated Michael Oku to earn an Undisputed British Heavyweight Championship match. He defeated Oku for the title at the 14th Anniversary Show.
British J-Cup	Nino Bryant	June 27	Defeated Leon Cage, Will Kaven, and Robbie X in the final, which was contested as a four-way elimination match, to earn an Undisputed British Cruiserweight Championship match. He challenged Leyton Buzzard for the title at the 14th Anniversary Show but was unsuccessful.
Women's Grand Prix	Kanji	July 25	Defeated Zeuxis in the final to earn an Undisputed British Women's Championship match. She defeated Alexxis Falcon for the title at the 14th Anniversary Show.
Undisputed British Cruiserweight Championship Tournament	Cameron Khai	October 17	Defeated Titán in the final to win the vacant Undisputed British Cruiserweight Championship. Previous champion Leyton Buzzard vacated the title due to an ACL injury.

=== ROH ===
Accomplishment	Winner(s)	Date	Notes
Survival of the Fittest	Athena	May 15	Last eliminated Maya World to retain the ROH Women's World Championship.

=== Seadlinning ===
Accomplishment	Winner(s)	Date	Notes
Seadlinning Saikyo Tournament	Ayame Sasamura	April 17	Defeated Beyond the Sea Single Champion Hiroyo Matsumoto in the final to win the title.

=== Stardom ===
Accomplishment	Winner(s)	Date	Notes
Cinderella Tournament	Hanan	March 15	Defeated Rina in the final to earn a "wish" of her desire, which was a Wonder of Stardom Championship match. She defeated Konami to win the title at All Star Grand Queendom.
Rookie of the Year Tournament	Ema Maishima	April 11	Defeated Kikyo Furusawa in the final to earn a Future of Stardom Championship match. She challenged Ranna Yagami for the title at All Star Grand Queendom but was unsuccessful.
5 Star Grand Prix	Rina	August 23	Defeated Starlight Kid in the final to earn a World of Stardom Championship match.
Goddesses of Stardom Tag League	TBD	November 29	18-team round-robin tournament for a future Goddess of Stardom Championship match.

=== Tenryu Project ===
Accomplishment	Winner(s)	Date	Notes
Mixed Tag Team 1 Day Tournament	Hikaru Sato and Ayame Sasamura	April 17	Defeated Yusuke Kodama and Kaho Kobayashi in the finals to win.
Ryūkon Cup	Koji Iwamoto	November 21	Defeated Takuro Niki in the finals to win.

=== TNA ===
Accomplishment	Winner(s)	Date	Notes
Feast or Fired	Eric Young, Steve Maclin, Trey Miguel, and Eddie Edwards	January 22	Each won a briefcase for a future title opportunity or a pink slip. The contents of the cases were revealed the following week: Young (Case 1 – TNA X Division Championship) – Young challenged Leon Slater for the title at Sacrifice but was unsuccessful.; Maclin (Case 2 – Pink Slip) – Maclin was fired in kayfabe. He was later reinstated on the March 5 live episode of Thursday Night Impact!; Edwards (Case 3 – TNA World Championship) – Edwards challenged Mike Santana for the title at Rebellion but was unsuccessful.; Miguel (Case 4 – TNA International Championship) – Miguel defeated Channing "Stacks" Lorenzo at No Surrender to win the title.
TNA Knockouts World Championship #1 Contender's Battle Royal	Jody Threat	February 13	Last eliminated Tessa Blanchard to earn a TNA Knockouts World Championship match. She challenged Arianna Grace for the title on the March 5 live episode of Thursday Night Impact! but was unsuccessful.
TNA World Championship #1 Contender's Battle Royal	Eric Young	May 14	Last eliminated Elijah to earn a TNA World Championship match. He challenged Mike Santana for the title at the June 6 Thursday Night Impact! taping, which aired on June 11, but was unsuccessful.
TNA Knockouts Television Championship Tournament	M by Elegance	August 27	16-woman single-elimination tournament to determine the inaugural TNA Knockouts Television Champion.
World X-Cup	Ricky Sosa	November 15	Defeated Fabian Aichner, Jason Hotch, The Home Town Man, and Amir Jordan in a five-way elimination match to win the World X-Cup Trophy.

=== Wave Pro ===
Accomplishment	Winner(s)	Date	Notes
Wave Single Championship #1 Contender's Tournament	Kaho Kobayashi	January 25	Defeated Sumire Natsu in the final to earn a Wave Single Championship match. She challenged Itsuki Aoki for the title at Valentine Wave but was unsuccessful.
Catch the Wave	Haruka Umesaki	July 12	Defeated Honoka in the final to earn the title of "Nami Oona", ¥1,000,000, and a Wave Single Championship match. She will challenge Itsuki Aoki for the title on August 15.

=== WWE ===
==== Raw and SmackDown ====
Accomplishment	Winner(s)	Date	Notes
Undisputed WWE Championship #1 Contender's Tournament	Sami Zayn	January 24	Defeated Randy Orton, Trick Williams, and Damian Priest in the final to earn an Undisputed WWE Championship match at Royal Rumble. He challenged Drew McIntyre for the title at the event but was unsuccessful.
Royal Rumble match (Women)	Liv Morgan	January 31	Last eliminated Tiffany Stratton to earn a women's world championship match of her choice at WrestleMania 42. Morgan from Raw chose to challenge for her own brand's Women's World Championship, held by Stephanie Vaquer, whom she defeated to win the title on Night 1 of the event.
Royal Rumble match (Men)	Roman Reigns	January 31	Last eliminated Gunther to earn a men's world championship match of his choice at WrestleMania 42. Reigns won as a SmackDown wrestler but chose to challenge for Raw's World Heavyweight Championship, held by CM Punk, whom he defeated to win the title on Night 2 at the event.
Elimination Chamber (Women)	Rhea Ripley	February 28	Defeated Alexa Bliss, Kiana James, Asuka, Raquel Rodriguez, and Tiffany Stratton, who she last eliminated, as a Raw wrestler to challenge for SmackDown's WWE Women's Championship at WrestleMania 42. She subsequently defeated Jade Cargill to win the title on Night 2 the event.
Elimination Chamber (Men)	Randy Orton	February 28	Defeated Je'Von Evans, LA Knight, Trick Williams, Logan Paul, and Cody Rhodes, who he last eliminated, as a SmackDown wrestler to challenge for his own brand's Undisputed WWE Championship at WrestleMania 42. He challenged Cody Rhodes for the title on Night 1 of the event but was unsuccessful.
WWE Tag Team Championship #1 Contender's Tag Team Turmoil match	Damian Priest and R-Truth	March 6	Last eliminated Los Garza (Angel and Berto) to earn a WWE Tag Team Championship match. They defeated The MFTs (JC Mateo and Tama Tonga) to win the titles on the March 20 episode of SmackDown.
WWE Women's Intercontinental Championship #1 Contender's Gauntlet match	Bayley	March 9	Last eliminated Asuka to earn a WWE Women's Intercontinental Championship match. She challenged AJ Lee for the title on the March 16 episode of Raw but was unsuccessful.
André the Giant Memorial Battle Royal	Royce Keys	April 17	Last eliminated Talla Tonga to win the André the Giant Memorial Trophy.
Queen of the Ring tournament	Iyo Sky	June 27	Defeated Liv Morgan in the final to earn the title of Queen of the Ring and a women's world championship match at SummerSlam. She won as a Raw wrestler and challenged Morgan for Raw's Women's World Championship on Night 1 of the event but was unsuccessful.
King of the Ring tournament	Oba Femi	June 27	Defeated Jey Uso in the final to earn the title of King of the Ring and a men's world championship match at SummerSlam. He won as a Raw wrestler but relinquished his title opportunity to instead face Brock Lesnar in a Hell in a Cell match on Night 1 of the event.
WWE Intercontinental Championship #1 Contender's Gauntlet match	Chad Gable	July 13	Last eliminated Ethan Page to earn a WWE Intercontinental Championship match at SummerSlam. He defeated Penta to win the title on Night 2 of the event.
Interim WWE Women's Championship Tournament	Chelsea Green	August 2	Defeated Tiffany Stratton, Jade Cargill, Charlotte Flair, and Lash Legend in the final, which was contested as a ladder match, to become the interim WWE Women's Champion. Lineal champion Rhea Ripley had been ruled inactive due to injury. On September 11, Green was retroactively made the lineal champion.
World Heavyweight Championship #1 Contender's Tournament	Penta	August 31	Defeated Rey Fénix to earn a World Heavyweight Championship match on the September 14 episode of Raw in Mexico City, Mexico. He challenged Roman Reigns for the title on the show but was unsuccessful.
Money in the Bank ladder match (Women)	Tiffany Stratton	October 10	Defeated Jacy Jayne, Lash Legend, Lola Vice, Roxanne Perez, and Sil Ruca in a six-woman ladder match for a women's championship match contract. She cashed in on and won the WWE Women's Championship from Chelsea Green at Crown Jewel.
Money in the Bank ladder match (Men)	Penta	October 10	Defeated Bron Breakker, CM Punk, Je'Von Evans, Kevin Owens, and Trick Williams in a six-man ladder match for a men's championship match contract.
WWE Women's Crown Jewel Championship	Chelsea Green	November 6	Defeated Raw's Women's World Champion Liv Morgan to win the WWE Women's Crown Jewel Championship. Green was SmackDown's WWE Women's Champion.
WWE Women's Crown Jewel Championship	Roman Reigns	November 6	Defeated SmackDown's Undisputed WWE Champion Sami Zayn to win the WWE Crown Jewel Championship. Reigns was Raw's World Heavyweight Champion.
John Cena Classic	TBD	December 14	The winner, who would be voted on by members of Club WWE, would receive the John Cena Classic Championship.

==== NXT ====
Accomplishment	Winner(s)	Date	Notes
WWE Speed Championship #1 Contender's Tournament	Elio LeFleur and Eli Knight	February 17	The final ended in a time limit draw. As a result, both men challenged Jasper Troy for the WWE Speed Championship on the February 24 episode of NXT, with LeFleur pinning Troy to win the title.
WWE Women's Speed Championship #1 Contender's Tournament	Wren Sinclair	March 10	Defeated Thea Hail in the final to earn a WWE Women's Speed Championship match. She defeated Fallon Henley to win the title on the March 17 episode of NXT.
NXT North American Championship #1 Contender's Gauntlet Eliminator	Johnny Gargano	March 24	Last eliminated Shiloh Hill to earn an NXT North American Championship match at Stand & Deliver. He challenged Myles Borne for the title at the event but was unsuccessful.
NXT Tag Team Championship #1 Contender's Tournament	Los Americanos (Rayo Americano and Bravo Americano)	March 31	Defeated BirthRight (Channing "Stacks" Lorenzo and Uriah Connors) in the final to earn an NXT Tag Team Championship match at Stand & Deliver. They challenged Swipe Right (Brad Baylor and Ricky Smokes) for the titles at the event but were unsuccessful.
WWE Speed Championship Tournament	Lexis King	April 21	Defeated EK Prosper in the final to win the vacant WWE Speed Championship.
WWE Speed Championship #1 Contender's Tournament	Romeo Moreno	May 26	Won by default to earn a WWE Speed Championship. He challenged Lexis King for the title on the June 2 episode of NXT but was unsuccessful.
WWE Women's Speed Championship #1 Contender's Tournament	Arianna Grace	June 23	Defeated Izzi Dame in the final to earn a WWE Women's Speed Championship match at The Great American Bash. She challenged Wren Sinclair for the title at the event but was unsuccessful.
NXT Women's Championship #1 Contender's Battle Royal	Wren Sinclair	October 6	Disguised as Lady Shani; last eliminated Kali Armstrong to earn a NXT Women's Championship at Halloween Havoc. She challenged Kelani Jordan for the title at the event but was unsuccessful.
Dusty Rhodes Tag Team Classic	Noam Dar and Romeo Moreno	November 4	Defeated Hank & Tank (Hank Walker and Tank Ledger) to win the Dusty Cup and earn an NXT Tag Team Championship match. They will challenge Swipe Right (Brad Baylor and Ricky Smokes) for the titles on the November 10 episode of NXT.

==== WWE Evolve ====
Accomplishment	Winner(s)	Date	Notes
WWE Evolve Women's Championship Gauntlet Eliminator	Wendy Choo	March 20 (aired April 15)	Last eliminated Nikkita Lyons to win the vacant WWE Evolve Women's Championship.

=== wXw ===
Accomplishment	Winner(s)	Date	Notes
Road to 16 Carat Gold Tournament	Dieter Schwartz	February 8	Defeated Fast Time Moodo in the final to earn a spot in the 16 Carat Gold Tournament.
16 Carat Gold Tournament	Ahura	March 8	Defeated Peter Tihanyi in the final to earn a wXw Unified World Wrestling Championship match. He defeated Elijah Blum to win the title at Shortcut to The Top.
Shortcut to The Top match	Kanji	August 15	Last eliminated Jane Nero to win, becoming the first woman to win the match. Instead of a wXw Unified World Wrestling Championship match, she demanded the reinstatement of the WXw Women's World Championship.
Catch Grand Prix	Dennis Dullnig	September 27	Defeated Elijah Blum in the final to earn a wXw Unified World Wrestling Championship match.
Femmes Fatales	Chihiro Hashimoto	September 27	Defeated Kanji in the final to win the reactivated wXw Women's World Championship.
World Tag Team Festival	Greedy Souls (Brendan White and Danny Jones)	September 27	Defeated Hyperactive (Anita Vaughan and Safire Reed) in the final to earn a wXw World Tag Team Championship match. They defeated CSI (Luca de Leone and Nordino) to win the titles at We Love Wrestling 80

=== Zero1 ===
Accomplishment	Winner(s)	Date	Notes
Saikyou Ketteisen Tournament	Junya Matsunaga	January 17	Defeated Chris Vice in the final to win.
Universe Cup	Naomichi Marufuji	April 6	Defeated Sanshiro Takagi in the final to win.
Fire Festival	Katsuhiko Nakajima	August 7	Defeated Masato Tanaka in the final to win the Fire Sword.
Tenkaichi Junior	Van Vert Jack	October 10	Defeated Naruki Doi in the final to win.

== Title changes ==
=== 2AW ===
2AW Openweight Championship
Incoming champion – Takuro Niki
Date	Winner	Event/Show	Note(s)
March 29 (aired April 5)	Ayato Yoshida	Grand Slam in Korakuen Hall	
June 21	Taishi Takizawa	2AW 7th Anniversary	

2AW Tag Team Championship
Incoming champions – MJ2 (Kengo Mashimo and Kyu Mogami)
Date	Winner	Event/Show	Note(s)
June 21	The Red Line (Tatsuya Hanami and Yuya Aoki)	2AW 7th Anniversary	
August 11	Ayumu Honda and Kengo	Beer Garden; Night 3	
October 12	Ayato Yoshida and Minoru Fujita	Grand Slam In Korakuen Hall	

2AW Trios Championship
(Titles created)
Date	Winner	Event/Show	Note(s)
July 5	The Red Line (Ayame Sasamura, Tatsuya Hanami, and Yuya Aoki)	2AW/The Red Line Produce Limit Break Vol. 1 ~ The Starting Line at Dawn	Defeated Makoto Oishi, Shiori Asahi, and Takuro Niki to become the inaugural champions.

=== AAA ===
AAA Mega Championship
Incoming champion – Dominik Mysterio
Date	Winner	Event/Show	Note(s)
September 11	El Grande Americano	Triplemanía 34; Night 2	This was a No Disqualification match.

AAA World Cruiserweight Championship
Incoming champion – Laredo Kid
Date	Winner	Event/Show	Note(s)
May 30	Rey Fénix	Noche de Los Grandes; Week 1	

AAA Latin American Championship
Incoming champion – El Hijo de Dr. Wagner Jr.
Date	Winner	Event/Show	Note(s)
May 30	El Hijo del Vikingo	Noche de Los Grandes; Week 1	
July 11	Vacated	Lucha Libre AAA	AAA General Manager Rey Mysterio vacated the title after previous champion El Hijo del Vikingo suffered a knee injury.
August 30	La Parka	Ola de Calor	Defeated Damian Priest, El Fiscal, and El Hijo de Dr. Wagner Jr. in the finals of a tournament, which was contested as a fatal four-way match.

AAA Reina de Reinas Championship
Incoming champion – Flammer
Date	Winner	Event/Show	Note(s)
September 11	La Catalina	Triplemanía 34; Night 2	

AAA World Tag Team Championship
Incoming champions – Pagano and Psycho Clown
Date	Winner	Event/Show	Note(s)
May 30	War Raiders (Erik and Ivar)	Noche de Los Grandes; Week 1	
September 11	The Wagner Brothers (El Hijo de Dr. Wagner Jr. and Galeno)	Triplemanía 34; Night 2	This was an Open Challenge.

AAA World Mixed Tag Team Championship
Incoming champions – Chelsea Green and Ethan Page
Date	Winner	Event/Show	Note(s)
February 7	Lola Vice and Mr. Iguana	Lucha Libre AAA	La Hiedra wrestled on behalf of Chelsea Green, who was unable to compete due to a foot injury.
July 25	La Hiedra and Laredo Kid	Verano de Escándalo; Week 1	
November 14 (will air TBA)	Big Mami and Niño Hamburguesa	Lucha Libre AAA	

AAA World Trios Championship
Incoming champions – Los Psycho Circus (Psycho Clown, Murder Clown, Panic Clown, and Dave the Clown)
Date	Winner	Event/Show	Note(s)
September 11	Los Perros del Mal (Daga, Angel, and Berto)	Triplemanía 34; Night 1	Psycho Clown, Murder Clown, and Dave the Clown of the previous champions Los Psycho Circus defended the title.

=== AAW ===
AAW Heavyweight Championship
Incoming champion – Trevor Lee
Date	Winner	Event/Show	Note(s)
April 24 (aired April 27)	Rafael Quintaro	Crush & Destroy	
May 22 (aired May 25)	Joe Alonzo	Homecoming	

AAW Heritage Championship
Incoming champion – Isaiah Moore
Date	Winner	Event/Show	Note(s)

AAW Women's Championship
Incoming champion – Maggie Lee
Date	Winner	Event/Show	Note(s)
February 21 (aired February 26)	Heather Reckless	Chi-Town Rumble	This was a two out of three falls match; Reckless won 2–1.
July 10 (aired July 16)	Maggie Lee	United We Stand	This was a Bourbon Street Fight.

AAW Tag Team Championship
Incoming champion – The Hellhounds (Russ Jones and Schaff)
Date	Winner	Event/Show	Note(s)

=== AEW ===
AEW World Championship
Incoming champion – MJF
Date	Winner	Event/Show	Note(s)
April 15	Darby Allin	Dynamite: Spring BreakThru	
May 24	MJF	Double or Nothing	This was a Title vs. Hair match.
July 8	Kenny Omega	Dynamite: Beach Break	This was a Last Chance match.
August 30	Will Ospreay	All In	

AEW Women's World Championship
Incoming champion – Kris Statlander
Date	Winner	Event/Show	Note(s)
February 11	Thekla	Dynamite	This was a Strap match.
July 26	Willow Nightingale	Redemption	
August 30	Mercedes Moné	All In	

AEW International Championship
Incoming champion – Kazuchika Okada
Date	Winner	Event/Show	Note(s)
May 24	Konosuke Takeshita	Double or Nothing	
July 8	Kyle Fletcher	Dynamite: Beach Break	
August 30	Kazuchika Okada	All In	This was a three-way match, also involving Konosuke Takeshita.

AEW Continental Championship
Incoming champion – Jon Moxley
Date	Winner	Event/Show	Note(s)

AEW National Championship
Incoming champion – Ricochet
Date	Winner	Event/Show	Note(s)
March 15	Jack Perry	Revolution	This was a 21-man Blackjack Battle Royal in which Perry last eliminated Ricochet to win. The match began during the Zero Hour pre-show but concluded after the start of the pay-per-view.
May 9	Mark Davis	Collision: Fairway to Hell	
July 26	Andrade El Ídolo	Redemption	
November 7	Tommaso Ciampa	Collision: Chris Jericho's Rock 'N' Wrestling Rager at Sea	
November 14	Ilja Dragunov	Full Gear	

AEW TNT Championship
Incoming champion – Mark Briscoe
Date	Winner	Event/Show	Note(s)
January 31	Tommaso Ciampa	Collision	
February 11	Kyle Fletcher	Dynamite	
April 8	Vacated	–	The title was vacated due to Kyle Fletcher suffering various injuries.
April 12	Kevin Knight	Dynasty	This was a 10-man Casino Gauntlet match for the vacant title. Knight pinned Daniel Garcia to win.
August 30	Darby Allin	All In	This was a Falls Count Anywhere match.

AEW TBS Championship
Incoming champion – Willow Nightingale
Date	Winner	Event/Show	Note(s)
May 20	Vacated	Dynamite	The title was vacated due to Willow Nightingale suffering a shoulder injury.
July 1	Hikaru Shida	Dynamite	Last eliminated Kris Statlander in a six-woman Survival of the Fittest match to win the vacant title.
July 26	Maya World	Redemption	
August 30	Persephone	All In; The Buy In	
October 28	Queen Aminata	Fright Night Dynamite	

AEW World Tag Team Championship
Incoming champions – FTR (Dax Harwood and Cash Wheeler)
Date	Winner	Event/Show	Note(s)
May 24	Cage and Cope (Christian Cage and Adam Copeland)	Double or Nothing	This was a New York Street Fight "I Quit" match where if Cage and Cope had lost, they would have disbanded as a team forever.
September 26	The Young Bucks (Matt Jackson and Nick Jackson)	All Out	This was a three-way Ladder match, also involving FTR (Dax Harwood and Cash Wheeler).

AEW Women's World Tag Team Championship
Incoming champions – The Babes of Wrath (Willow Nightingale and Harley Cameron)
Date	Winner	Event/Show	Note(s)
March 15	Divine Dominion (Megan Bayne and Lena Kross)	Revolution	
August 30	The Brawling Birds (Jamie Hayter and Alex Windsor)	All In	
November 14	Wrathlander (Harley Cameron and Kris Statlander)	Full Gear	

AEW World Trios Championship
Incoming champions – The Opps (Samoa Joe, Powerhouse Hobbs, and Katsuyori Shibata)
Date	Winner	Event/Show	Note(s)
January 14 (aired January 17)	Jet Set Rodeo ("Hangman" Adam Page, Kevin Knight, and Mike Bailey)	Collision: Maximum Carnage	
March 4	The Don Callis Family (Kazuchika Okada, Kyle Fletcher, and Mark Davis)	Dynamite	
March 15	Místico and JetSpeed (Kevin Knight and Mike Bailey)	Revolution	
April 8 (aired April 11)	The Dogs (David Finlay, Clark Connors, and Gabe Kidd)	Collision	
April 12	The Conglomeration (Orange Cassidy, Roderick Strong, and Kyle O'Reilly)	Dynasty	
July 29	The Demand (Ricochet, Bishop Kaun, and Toa Liona)	Dynamite	
August 5	"Hangman" Adam Page and Brodido (Brody King and Bandido)	Dynamite: Grand Slam Mexico	
August 30	Swerve Strickland and The New Level (Austin Creed and Kofi)	All In	This was a seven-team Trios Roulette Royale in which Strickland and New Level lastly eliminated Gabe Kidd and Death Riders (Claudio Castagnoli, Pac) to win. The match started on the Buy In pre-show and concluded after the start of the pay-per-view.
October 17	"Hangman" Adam Page and Brodido (Brody King and Bandido)	WrestleDream	This was a two out of three falls match, won by 2–1.
November 14	Swerve Strickland and The New Level (Austin Creed and Kofi)	Full Gear	This was a Texas Death match.

=== AIW ===
AIW Absolute Championship
Incoming champion – Sam Holloway
Date	Winner	Event/Show	Note(s)
July 10	Wes Barkley	Absolution XIX	This was a five-way match also involving Chuck Stone, Eric Taylor, and Mikey Montgomery.

AIW Intense Championship
Incoming champion – Isiah Broner
Date	Winner	Event/Show	Note(s)
July 10	Kaplan	Absolution XIX	This was a three-way match also involving Nick Gage.

AIW Tag Team Championship
Incoming champions – Derek Dillinger and Tyson Riggs
Date	Winner	Event/Show	Note(s)
July 10	Swoggle and The Duke	Absolution XIX	

=== AJPW ===
Triple Crown Heavyweight Championship
Incoming champion – Kento Miyahara
Date	Winner	Event/Show	Note(s)

World Junior Heavyweight Championship
Incoming champion – Atsuki Aoyagi
Date	Winner	Event/Show	Note(s)
January 25	Seigo Tachibana	New Year Wars; Night 4	
June 18	Dan Tamura	Super Power Series; Night 6	

Gaora TV Championship
Incoming champion – Shotaro Ashino
Date	Winner	Event/Show	Note(s)
January 3	Daisuke Sekimoto	New Year Wars; Night 2	
February 23	Kuma Arashi	Excite Series; Night 4	
August 2	Masaaki Mochizuki	All Japan Pro-Wrestling Festival	
November 3	Oddyssey	Hokkaido Dynamite Series; Night 8	

World Tag Team Championship
Incoming champions – Havoc (Oddyssey and Xyon)
Date	Winner	Event/Show	Note(s)
January 2	Titans of Calamity (Ren Ayabe and Talos)	New Year Wars; Night 1	
June 6	Saito Brothers (Jun Saito and Rei Saito)	Super Power Series; Night 3	

All Asia Tag Team Championship
Incoming champions – Gajadokuro (Ishin and Yoshiki Kato)
Date	Winner	Event/Show	Note(s)
January 18	Don Fujii and Masaaki Mochizuki	DG Open the New Year Gate; Night 7	This was a Dragongate event. AJPW senior referee Kyohei Wada served as the special guest referee.
April 19	Genki Horiguchi and Yasushi Kanda	DG The Gate of Passion; Night 7: Day Show	This was a Dragongate event.
June 6	Gajadokuro (Ishin and Yoshiki Kato)	DG Rainbow Gate; Night 1	This was a Dragongate event. AJPW senior referee Kyohei Wada served as the special guest referee.
June 18	Atsuki Aoyagi and Rising Hayato	Super Power Series; Night 6	
August 5	Vacated	–	The titles were vacated after Aoyagi injured his ACL.

AJPW TV Six-Man Tag Team Championship
Incoming champions – Hokuto-gun (Hokuto Omori, Takashi Yoshida, and Kuma Arashi)
Date	Winner	Event/Show	Note(s)
January 25	Evolution (Dan Tamura, Hideki Suzuki, and Suwama)	New Year Wars; Night 4	
June 7	Kuma Arashi, Ryuki Honda and Seigo Tachibana	Super Power Series; Night 4	
October 12	Hideki Suzuki, Masayuki Kono and Shota Kofuji	Raising An Army Memorial Series; Night 3	
October 27	Go Shiozaki, Yasutaka Yano and Yuma Aoyagi	Hokkaido Dynamite Series 2026; Night 2	

=== Basara ===
Union Max Championship
Incoming champion – Shuji Ishikawa
Date	Winner	Event/Show	Note(s)
August 2	Takumi Tsukamoto	Basara 313 ~ Cho-Ko	

Iron Fist Tag Team Championship
Incoming champion – Daiki Shimomura and Takumi Tsukamoto
Date	Winner	Event/Show	Note(s)
March 27	Aijin Tag (Masato Kamino and Takato Nakano)	Basara 303 ~ Utage	

UWA World Tag Team Championship
Incoming champions – Andy Wu and Yasufumi Nakanoue
Date	Winner	Event/Show	Note(s)
February 23	Masaki Morihiro and Yuya Aoki	BJW	This was a Big Japan Pro-Wrestling event.
August 1	The Brahman Brothers (Brahman Kei and Brahman Shu)	BJW Shopping Street Pro Wrestling	This was a Big Japan Pro-Wrestling event.

=== BJW ===
BJW Deathmatch Heavyweight Championship
Incoming champion – Yusaku Ito
Date	Winner	Event/Show	Note(s)
January 2	Abdullah Kobayashi	New Year's Battle Begins	

BJW World Strong Heavyweight Championship
Incoming champion – So Daimonji
Date	Winner	Event/Show	Note(s)
April 29 (aired May 9)	Kazumasa Yoshida	Big Japan 31 Beyond The Survivor	

BJW JuniorHeavyweightChampionship
Incoming champion – Kosuke Sato
Date	Winner	Event/Show	Note(s)
August 23	Shoki Kitamura	BJW	

BJW Tag Team Championship
Incoming champions – Kazumi Kikuta and Toru Sugiura
Date	Winner	Event/Show	Note(s)

Yokohama Shopping Street 6-Man Tag Team Championship
Incoming champions – Abdullah Kobayashi, Kankuro Hoshino, and Ryuji Ito
Date	Winner	Event/Show	Note(s)
January 6	Tatsuhiko Yoshino and Brahman Brothers (Brahman Shu and Brahman Kei)	Welcome to Dainichi Ueno	
January 14	Abdullah Kobayashi, Kankuro Hoshino, and Ryuji Ito	BJW	
January 25	Kengo Takai, Kenta Kosugi and Mari Manji	Death Market 88	
July 26	Yosomono (Daichi Hashimoto, So Daimonji, and Joji Otani)	Death Market 91	

=== BZW ===
BZW Championship
Incoming champion – Jacob Vadocq
Date	Winner	Event/Show	Note(s)
March 14	Trent Seven	Rixe/BZE Apogée	Co-promoted with Rixe Catch.
July 4	Connor Mills	Jackpot	This was a three-way match also involving Jacob Vadocq.

BZW Hardcore Championship
Incoming champion – Georges Balzac
Date	Winner	Event/Show	Note(s)
January 24	Drew Parker	Enter the Zone	

BZW Tag Team Championship
Incoming champion – Mao and Yoshihiko
Date	Winner	Event/Show	Note(s)
May 23	Rivality (MBM and Sombra)	GCW/BZW Now or Never	Co-promoted with Game Changer Wrestling (GCW). This was a three-way tag team match also involving Jimmy Lloyd and Jeffrey John.

=== CF ===
– DDT Pro-Wrestling
– Pro Wrestling Noah
– Tokyo Joshi Pro-Wrestling

==== DDT ====
KO-D Openweight Championship
Incoming champion – Yuki Ueno
Date	Winner	Event/Show	Note(s)
August 11	Mao	Wrestle Peter Pan	

DDT Universal Championship
Incoming champion – Yuki Ueno
Date	Winner	Event/Show	Note(s)
January 25	Daisuke Sasaki	Mission in Battle Shinshun Kenran	This was a three-way match also involving Chris Brookes.
March 22	Kazuma Sumi	Judgement	
August 11	Ryusuke Taguchi	Wrestle Peter Pan	

DDT Extreme Championship
Incoming champion – To-y
Date	Winner	Event/Show	Note(s)
March 22	Hideki Okatani	Judgement	This was a If You Want To Use The Bamboo Sword Make Them Laugh! Staring Contest Punishment Bamboo Sword Deathmatch.
August 11	Shunma Katsumata	Wrestle Peter Pan	This was a Barbed Wire Deathmatch.

KO-D Tag Team Championship
Incoming champions – Strange Love Connenction (Mao and Kanon)
Date	Winner	Event/Show	Note(s)
April 5	Fantômes Dramatic (Chris Brookes and Harashima)	Change Age	
August 11	Shinya Aoki and Junta Miyawaki	Wrestle Peter Pan	
September 27	paleyouth (Takeshi Masada and Yuya Koroku)	Final Face 2026 Goodbye To Shinjuku FACE!	

KO-D 6-Man Tag Team Championship
Incoming champions – Kaisei Takechi and The 37Kamiina (To-y and Yuki Ueno)
Date	Winner	Event/Show	Note(s)
March 11	Paleyouth (Daichi Sato, Takeshi Masada, and Yuya Koroku)	Ichikabachika	
August 11	Strange Love Connection (Kanon, Viento Levante, and Yukio Naya)	Wrestle Peter Pan	
September 21	Damnation T.A (Daisuke Sasaki, Hideki Okatani and Ilusion)	Dramatic Infinity 2026	

KO-D 10-Man Tag Team Championship
Incoming champions – Damnation T.A. (Daisuke Sasaki, Demus, Hideki Okatani, MJ Paul and Ilusion)
Date	Winner	Event/Show	Note(s)

O-40 Championship
Incoming champion – Daisuke Sasaki
Date	Winner	Event/Show	Note(s)

World Ōmori Championship
Incoming champion – Masahiro Takanashi (lineal champion) / Kazuki Hirata (interim champion)
Date	Winner	Event/Show	Note(s)
November 8	Ilusion	Utan Festival 2026	Defeated interim champion Kazuki Hirata to become the new lineal champion.

Ironman Heavymetalweight Championship
Incoming champion – Mahiro Kiryu
Date	Winner	Event/Show	Note(s)
January 4	Aja Kong	Tokyo Joshi Pro-Wrestling '26	This was a Tokyo Joshi Pro-Wrestling event. This was a four-way match also involving Rika Tatsumi and Shino Suzuki, the latter of whom was pinned.
January 4	Mahiro Kiryu	Tokyo Joshi Pro-Wrestling '26	Kiryu and Rika Tatsumi pinned Kong at the same time; the referee awarded the title to Kiryu because she was on the bottom.
January 4	HyperMi Dramatic Dream	Tokyo Joshi Pro-Wrestling '26	Hyper Misao's modified bicycle. Misao ran over Kiryu during a match with Shoko Nakajima; the referee awarded the title to the bicycle.
January 4	Mahiro Kiryu	Tokyo Joshi Pro-Wrestling '26	
February 11	Miyu Yamashita	TJPW Shoko Quest IV: Those Guided By the Snow Country	This was a Tokyo Joshi Pro-Wrestling event. This was a three-way match also involving Raku; Yamashita pinned Kiryu to win the title.
February 11	Rise Shirai	TJPW Shoko Quest IV: Those Guided By the Snow Country	TJPW's ring announcer. Won at a post-show fan event, in a contest to see who could stop a stopwatch closest to 10 seconds.
February 11	Rise Shirai's stopwatch	TJPW Shoko Quest IV: Those Guided By the Snow Country	Mahiro Kiryu choked Shirai with her own stopwatch; the referee awarded the title to the timepiece.
February 11	Mahiro Kiryu	TJPW Shoko Quest IV: Those Guided By the Snow Country	
February 14	Aja Kong	TJPW "Futari wa Princess" Max Heart Tournament Final	This was a Tokyo Joshi Pro-Wrestling event.
February 21	Rika Tatsumi	TJPW Final Curtain in Kobe Art Center	Took place backstage at a Tokyo Joshi Pro-Wrestling event. Tatsumi, Pom Harajuku, and Mahiro Kiryu attacked Kong backstage and pinned her after she slipped on a banana peel. Tatsumi was awarded the title as she pinned Kong first.
March 5	Kukkie!	–	Japanese comedian. Tatsumi forfeited the title to Kukkie! in exchange for an interview and face painting.
March 5	Rika Tatsumi	–	Pinned Kukkie! midway through the interview and face painting.
March 11	Antonio Honda	Ichikabachika	Took place backstage.
March 11	Hisaya Imabayashi	Ichikabachika	General manager of DDT Pro-Wrestling. Attacked and pinned Honda after his scheduled match.
March 20	Minoru Suzuki	N/A	Beat Imabayashi at a press conference.
March 22	Hisaya Imabayashi's glasses	Judgement	Pinned Suzuki in a one-on-six handicap match where Suzuki faced Imabayashi, Sanshiro Takagi, Toru Owashi, Danshoku Dino, Antonio Honda, and Super Sasadango Machine.
March 22	Antonio Honda	Judgement	Broke the glasses.
March 29	Raku	TJPW Grand Princess '26	Pinned Honda backstage at a Tokyo Joshi Pro-Wrestling event.
March 29	Great Wakabayashi-kun	TJPW Grand Princess '26	Pinned Raku during a 12-person battle royal.
March 29	Mahiro Kiryu	TJPW Grand Princess '26	Pinned Tatsumi during the same battle royal.
March 29	Sumire Uesaka	TJPW Grand Princess '26	Voice actress. Pinned Kiryu during the same battle royal.
June 7	Shoko Nakajima	TJPW Stand Alone '26	This was a Tokyo Joshi Pro-Wrestling event.
June 7	Hyper Misao	TJPW Stand Alone '26	This was a Tokyo Joshi Pro-Wrestling event.
June 7	Pom Harajuku	TJPW Stand Alone '26	This was a Tokyo Joshi Pro-Wrestling event.
June 7	Kazuki Hirata	TJPW Stand Alone '26	This was a Tokyo Joshi Pro-Wrestling event.
June 10	Shunma Katsumata	Dramatic Style	
June 10	Kazuki Hirata	Dramatic Style	
June 10	Yuya Koroku	Dramatic Style	This was a six-man tag team match where Paleyouth (Koroku, Takeshi Masada, and Daichi Satoh) defeated Hirata, Kumadori, and Shunma Katsumata. Koroku pinned Hirata to win the title.
June 13	Takeshi Masada	Yokohama Night Splash	Pinned Koroku after a six-man tag team match where Paleyouth (Koroku, Masada, and Satoh) defeated Kazuki Hirata, Danshoku Dino, and Kanon.
June 13	Yuya Koroku	Yokohama Night Splash	
June 13	Kazuki Hirata	Yokohama Night Splash	
June 17 (aired June 20)	Yuya Koroku	Let's Go to Beer Garden Pro Wrestling; Night 1	Pinned Hirata after their sanctioned title match.
June 18 (aired June 21)	Bunbun	Let's Go to Beer Garden Pro Wrestling; Night 2	Paleyouth's stuffed toy mascot. While Paleyouth (Koroku, Takeshi Masada, and Daichi Sato) were making their entrance, Masada suddenly rolled up Koroku. However, Bunbun, whom Koroku was holding, was on top of Koroku first. Thus, the referee declared Bunbun the champion.
June 18 (aired June 21)	Antonio Honda	Let's Go to Beer Garden Pro Wrestling; Night 2	Pinned Bunbun in the ring.
June 18 (aired June 21)	Yuya Koroku	Let's Go to Beer Garden Pro Wrestling; Night 2	This was a six-man tag team match where Paleyouth (Koroku, Takeshi Masada, and Daichi Satoh) defeated Honda, Akito, and Chris Brookes. Koroku pinned Honda to win the title.
June 18 (aired June 21)	Kazuki Hirata	Let's Go to Beer Garden Pro Wrestling; Night 2	Pinned Koroku after attacking him with a hammer while the ring was being taken down for the main event.
June 19 (aired June 22)	Tearaway tights	Tropical Naniwan Summer	Danshoku Dino's tearaway tights. After Dino and Hirata lost to Paleyouth (Yuya Koroku and Daichi Satoh), Dino attacked Hirata before pinning him. However, because Dino's tights were in his hands as he pinned Hirata, the referee awarded the title to the tights.
June 20	Kazuki Hirata	–	Hirata sat on Dino's tights to win the title
June 27 (aired July 2)	Shunma Katsumata	Great Hammer Street Wrestling Showdown at Shimbashi Busho Yokocho	This was a tag team match where Katsumata and Yuni defeated Hirata and Danshoku Dino. Katsumata pinned Hirata to win the title.
June 28	Kimihiro	King of Kings	Master of ceremonies for Strange Love Connection. Kimihiro defeated Katsumata in a rap battle to win the title.
July 5 (aired July 8)	Chris Brookes	Rembrandt Highway Series ~ Ayu Coliseum in Atsugi	
July 5 (aired July 8)	Kimihiro	Rembrandt Highway Series ~ Ayu Coliseum in Atsugi	
July 8	Kazuma Sumi	Asakusa ROX Nakamise Fighting	This was a six-man tag team match where Sumi, Kanon, and Mao—who were accompanied by Kimihiro—defeated Danshoku Dino, Kazuki Hirata, and Yoshihiko. Sumi submitted Hirata to win the match and the title, as the latter was defending it on behalf of Kimihiro.
July 12 (aired July 15)	Yuya Koroku	Check Out DDT at Granship	
July 12 (aired July 15)	Kazuma Sumi	Check Out DDT at Granship	
July 15	Shunma Katsumata	Beer Garden Pro Wrestling in Shinjuku – Final Countdown 1	
July 19 (aired July 23)	Yuni	Let's Go! Imaike Mottoike	
July 26	Antonio Honda	Rock in Ring ~ One Hit Kill ~	This was a six-man tag team match where Honda, Hinata Kasai, and Masami Inahata defeated Yuni, Naomi Yoshimura, and Rukiya. Honda pinned Yuni to win the match and the title.
July 26	Raku	Rock in Ring ~ One Hit Kill ~	Pinned Honda after the match.
July 31	Marika Kobashi	TJPW Love & Tif Pro Wrestling; Day 1	
July 31	Amanda	TJPW Love & Tif Pro Wrestling; Day 1	Member of the idol group KLP48.
July 31	Mifu Ashida	TJPW Love & Tif Pro Wrestling; Day 1	Took place backstage. Ashida shook pom-poms in Amanda's face until she gave up and forfeited the title to her.
July 31	Shoko Nakajima	TJPW Love & Tif Pro Wrestling; Day 1	This was a six-woman tag team match where Nakajima, Hyper Misao, and Yuki Aino defeated Ashida, Miyu Yamashita, and Ren Konatsu. Nakajima pinned Ashida to win the match and the title.
July 31	Hyper Misao	TJPW Love & Tif Pro Wrestling; Day 1	Pinned Honda after the match.
July 31	Ai Asakura	TJPW Love & Tif Pro Wrestling; Day 1	Member of the idol group Neo Japonism.
July 31	Mifu Ashida	TJPW Love & Tif Pro Wrestling; Day 1	Tricked Asakura into forfeiting the title to her immediately afterward.
July 31	Shiori Futaba	TJPW Love & Tif Pro Wrestling; Day 1	Member of the idol group Congrazie!.
July 31	Shoko Nakajima	TJPW Love & Tif Pro Wrestling; Day 1	Won by submission after biting Futaba.
July 31	Pokotan	TJPW Love & Tif Pro Wrestling; Day 1	Mascot of DDT. Took place backstage.
July 31	Karin Matoba	N/A	Took place during a live Niji no Conquistador performance. Matoba pinned Pokotan after the mascot tripped while attempting to challenge Matoba to a dance-off.
July 31	Pokotan's head	N/A	Took place at the same performance. Pokotan put its head over Matoba's, who was scared and tapped out; the referee judged the head to be the new champion.
July 31	Mone Kitazawa	N/A	Member of the idol group NGT48. Took place backstage after the above performance.
August 1	Pom Harajuku	TJPW Love & Tif Pro Wrestling; Day 2	Took place backstage.
August 1	Reina Seiji	TJPW Love & Tif Pro Wrestling; Day 2	Member of the idol group NGT48.
August 1	Pom Harajuku	TJPW Love & Tif Pro Wrestling; Day 2	
August 1	Pom Harajuku's soft drink	TJPW Love & Tif Pro Wrestling; Day 2	Took place backstage. Pom Harajuku fell asleep holding a soft drink; the referee judged the beverage to be the new champion.
August 1	Zahrachahiyoni Saito	TJPW Love & Tif Pro Wrestling; Day 2	Member of the idol group Fishbowl. Took place backstage. Saito won by drinking the champion.
August 1	Rio Ohmori	TJPW Love & Tif Pro Wrestling; Day 2	Member of the idol group Ma'Scar'Piece. Saito agreed to put her championship on the line based on the result of a tag team match between Yuki Arai and Shino Suzuki (supported by Saito) and Hyper Misao and Haru Kazashiro (supported by Ohmori). Since Misao and Kazashiro won, Ohmori won the title.
August 1	Hyper Misao	TJPW Love & Tif Pro Wrestling; Day 2	
August 1	Mahiro Kiryu	TJPW Love & Tif Pro Wrestling; Day 2	
August 1	Tama	TJPW Love & Tif Pro Wrestling; Day 2	A mascot character. Attacked Kiryu with a kitchen knife.
August 1	Miyu Yamashita	TJPW Love & Tif Pro Wrestling; Day 2	Took Tama's knife and threatened it until it forfeited the title to her.
August 2	Marina Kumamoto	TJPW Love & Tif Pro Wrestling; Day 3	Member of the idol group Niji no Conquistador. Several wrestlers and idols pinned Yamashita at once; Kumamoto was judged to be on top of her.
August 2	Miyu Yamashita	TJPW Love & Tif Pro Wrestling; Day 3	Yamashita convinced Kumamoto to forfeit the title to her by reminding her that she might be attacked by her bandmates mid-performance.
August 2	Raku	TJPW Love & Tif Pro Wrestling; Day 3	Took place backstage.
August 2	Aya Kajishima's recorder	TJPW Love & Tif Pro Wrestling; Day 3	Member of the idol group Up Up Girls Kakko Kari. Kajishima played Raku a lullaby with a recorder and then attempted to pin her; however, the referee judged the recorder to be the new champion.
August 2	Aya Kajishima	TJPW Love & Tif Pro Wrestling; Day 3	
August 2	Pom Harajuku	TJPW Love & Tif Pro Wrestling; Day 3	
August 2	Tetsuya Koda	TJPW Love & Tif Pro Wrestling; Day 3	President of Tokyo Joshi Pro-Wrestling. Attacked Harajuku while disguised as Pokotan.
August 5	Hisana Imabayashi	DDT Memories of Summer Vacation	
August 5	Ilusion	DDT Memories of Summer Vacation	
August 7	Yuni	Wrestle Peter Pan Press Conference and Pre-Event Party	Pinned Ilusion in a match where Yuni and Shunma Katsumata defeated Ilusion and Hideki Okatani.
August 7	Ilusion	Wrestle Peter Pan Press Conference and Pre-Event Party	
August 7	Masami Inahata	Wrestle Peter Pan Press Conference and Pre-Event Party	
August 7	Takeshi Masada	Wrestle Peter Pan Press Conference and Pre-Event Party	Pinned Inahata in a match that also involved Masada, Yuya Koroku, and Daichi Sato defeated Inahata, Kazuma Sumi, and To-y.
August 7	Yuki Ishida	Wrestle Peter Pan Press Conference and Pre-Event Party	
August 11	Ilusion	Wrestle Peter Pan	This was a gauntlet entry battle royal. Ilusion last eliminated Yoshihiko to win the match and the title
August 11	Super Sasadango Machine	Wrestle Peter Pan	
August 11	Yuki Ishida	Wrestle Peter Pan	
August 11	Yuni	Wrestle Peter Pan	
August 11	Kazuki Hirata	Wrestle Peter Pan	
August 11	Akito	Wrestle Peter Pan	
August 11	Masami Inahata	Wrestle Peter Pan	
August 11	Yoshihiko	Wrestle Peter Pan	
August 11	Ilusion	Wrestle Peter Pan	
August 11	Kazuki Hirata	Wrestle Peter Pan	
August 11	Shogo Yamamoto	Wrestle Peter Pan	Member of J-Pop group The Rampage from Exile Tribe, serving as the Peter Pan event's ambassador.
August 13	Shunma Katsumata	Beer Garden Pro Wrestling In Shinjuku - Final Countdown 3	
August 13	Yuni	Beer Garden Pro Wrestling In Shinjuku - Final Countdown 3	
August 13	Kumadori	Beer Garden Pro Wrestling In Shinjuku - Final Countdown 3	Member of music/dance group O-MENZ. This was a six-man tag team match where Kumadori, Masami Inahata, and Naomi Yoshimura defeated NωA Jr. (Yuni, Shunma Katsumata, and Kazuma Sumi). Kumadori pinned Yuni to win the match and the title.
August 13	Shunma Katsumata	Beer Garden Pro Wrestling In Shinjuku - Final Countdown 3	
August 14	Danshoku Dino	–	
August 17	Kazuma Sumi	After Petr Pan ~ Ryogoku After Party ~	
August 26	Shunma Katsumata	Dramatic Beer Garden Neverland	
August 30	Kumadori	Last Summer Standing ~Summer's Reckoning~	
September 9	Shunma Katsumata	Ring no Aki Basho	
September 9	Masami Inahata	Ring no Aki Basho	
September 19	Danshoku Dino	N/A	
September 21	Jun Akiyama	Dramatic Infinity	This was a tag team match in which Akiyama teamed up with Yuji Nagata to defeat Harashima and Dino, who took the pinfall and lose the title.
September 21	Yuji Nagata	Dramatic Infinity	Nagata pinned Akiyama in the ring.
September 27	Manabu Nakanishi	N/A	
September 27	Yuji Nagata	N/A	
September 28	Sanshiro Takagi	Super Japan Shinjuku FACE Countdown Series ~Goodbye Shinjuku FACE~	
September 30	Yuka Ogawa	Shinjuku FACE Countdown Series ~Meishin Rukotsu~	Manager of Shinjuku Face.
September 30	Shinjuku Face	Shinjuku FACE Countdown Series ~Meishin Rukotsu~	Ogawa gave up the title to the event hall itself, paying homage to the latter's close down.
September 30	Vacated	Shinjuku FACE Countdown Series ~Meishin Rukotsu~	The title became vacant as a result of the champion, Shinjuku Face, closing.
October 4	Yuki Ueno	Naniwa Pro Wrestling Road	Defeated Masami Inahata to win the vacant title.
October 8	Shunma Katsumata	Beer Garden Pro Wrestling 2026	
October 8	Yuki Ueno	Beer Garden Pro Wrestling 2026	
October 18	Super Sasadango Machine	Wrestling Harvest	
October 18	Danshoku Dino	Wrestling Harvest	
October 18	To-y	Wrestling Harvest	
October 18	Super Sasadango Machine	Wrestling Harvest	
October 18	Yui Yoshida	Wrestling Harvest	
October 18	Danshoku Dino	Wrestling Harvest	
October 18	Yuki Ueno	Wrestling Harvest	
October 18	Kazuki Hirata	Wrestling Harvest	
October 18	Super Sasadango Machine	Wrestling Harvest	
October 24	Junta Miyawaki	Yokohama Pro Wrestling Rhapsody	Pinned Super Sasadango Machine in a tag team match in which Miyawaki teamed with Jun Akiyama to face Sasadango and Danshoku Dino.
November 3	Mason Madden	Ultimate Party	
November 3	Mansoor	Ultimate Party	
November 3	Yoshihiko	Ultimate Party	

==== Noah ====
GHC Heavyweight Championship
Incoming champion – Yoshiki Inamura
Date	Winner	Event/Show	Note(s)
May 2	Shane Haste	Spring Mayhem	
August 9	Tetsuya Naito	Legacy Rise; Night 3	

GHC Junior Heavyweight Championship
Incoming champion – Hiromu Takahashi
Date	Winner	Event/Show	Note(s)
January 1	Amakusa	The New Year	
May 2	Dragon Bane	Spring Mayhem	
June 18	Eita	Eita's 15th Anniversary	
August 10	Kai Fujimura	Legacy Rise; Night 4	

GHC National Championship
Incoming champion – Dragon Bane
Date	Winner	Event/Show	Note(s)
January 1	Alpha Wolf	The New Year	
May 5	Naomichi Marufuji	Legacy Rise	
October 25	Luis Mante	Wrestle Odyssey	

GHC Women's Championship
Co-promoted with Dream Star Fighting Marigold
Incoming champion – Takumi Iroha
Date	Winner	Event/Show	Note(s)
January 3	Mayu Iwatani	Marigold First Dream	
May 18	Vacated	Noah Monday Magic Inside Out Ep. 1	The title was vacated due to Mayu Iwatani suffering a fractured toe.
June 15	Mirai	Wrestle Magic	Defeated The Great Sakuta to win the vacant title.

GHC Tag Team Championship
Incoming champions – Maruken (Naomichi Marufuji and Kenoh)
Date	Winner	Event/Show	Note(s)
January 1	Los Tranquilos de Japon (Bushi and Tetsuya Naito)	The New Year	
June 25	Jōnetsu Max (Manabu Soya and Yuki Iino)	Legacy Rise; Night 2	

GHC Junior Heavyweight Tag Team Championship
Incoming champions – Los Intocables (Daga and Daiki Odashima)
Date	Winner	Event/Show	Note(s)
March 8	Alejandro and Dragon Bane	Apex Conquest	
October 4	Team 2000X (Jun Masaoka and Yo-Hey)	N-1 Victory (Finals)	

GHC Openweight Hardcore Championship
Incoming champion – Hayata
Date	Winner	Event/Show	Note(s)
January 19	Titus Alexander	Monday Magic Rising Sun Season #1	
February 9	Masato Tanaka	Monday Magic Rising Sun Season #4	
May 25	Hikaru Sato	Monday Magic Inside Out Season #2	
June 1	Vacated	–	The title was vacated due to Sato suffering an injury.
June 15	Shuji Ishikawa	Wrestle Magic	Defeated Daisuke Sekimoto to win the vacant title.

GHC 200 Championship
(Title created)
Date	Winner	Event/Show	Note(s)
August 10	Hayata	Legacy Rise; Night 4	Defeated Tetsuya Endo in a tournament final to become the inaugural champion.
October 25	Shuji Kondo	Wrestle Odyssey	

==== TJPW ====
Princess of Princess Championship
Incoming champion – Miu Watanabe
Date	Winner	Event/Show	Note(s)
March 29	Yuki Arai	Grand Princess	

International Princess Championship
Incoming champion – Arisu Endo
Date	Winner	Event/Show	Note(s)
January 4	Mirai	Tokyo Joshi Pro '26	
March 29	Suzume	Grand Princess	

Princess Tag Team Championship
Incoming champions – Ober Eats (Yuki Kamifuku and Wakana Uehara)
Date	Winner	Event/Show	Note(s)
March 29	The IInspiration (Jessie McKay and Cassie Lee)	Grand Princess	
May 4	Hakuchuumu (Miu Watanabe and Rika Tatsumi)	Yes! Wonderland	
October 3	Shunrai Rekka Prism Greed (Yuki Aino and Haru Kazashiro)	Wrestle Princess VII	

=== ChocoPro ===
Super Asia Championship
Incoming champion – Rina Yamashita
Date	Winner	Event/Show	Note(s)
March 23 (aired March 29)	Miya Yotsuba	ChocoPro 511: The Promised	

Asia Dream Tag Team Championship
Incoming champion – Egg Tart (Hagane Shinnou and Chie Koishikawa)
Date	Winner	Event/Show	Note(s)
March 23 (aired March 29)	Vacated	ChocoPro 511: The Promised	The titles were vacated due to Shinnou suffering an injury.
March 23 (aired March 29)	Orange Panna Cotta (Chie Koishikawa and Sayaka)	ChocoPro 511: The Promised	Defeated Choun Shiryu and Lee Yoneyamakao, and Minoru Fujita and Sayaka Obihiro in a three-way tag team match to win the vacant titles.
June 25	Obihiro Shokudo Main Store (Minoru Fujita and Sayaka Obihiro)	ChocoPro 531: Make At Ikusa	

=== CMLL ===
CMLL World Heavyweight Championship
Incoming champion – Claudio Castagnoli
Date	Winner	Event/Show	Note(s)
March 20	Hechicero	Homenaje a Dos Leyendas	

CMLL World Light Heavyweight Championship
Incoming champion – Místico
Date	Winner	Event/Show	Note(s)

CMLL World Middleweight Championship
Incoming champion – Templario
Date	Winner	Event/Show	Note(s)

CMLL World Welterweight Championship
Incoming champion – Titán
Date	Winner	Event/Show	Note(s)

CMLL World Lightweight Championship
Incoming champion – Stigma
Date	Winner	Event/Show	Note(s)

CMLL Arena Puebla Openweight Championship
(Title created)
Date	Winner	Event/Show	Note(s)
July 27	Prayer	Lunes Clásico	Last eliminated Tiger Boy in a torneo cibernetico to become the inaugural champion.

CMLL World Mini-Estrella Championship
Incoming champion – Angelito
Date	Winner	Event/Show	Note(s)

CMLL World Micro-Estrella Championship
Incoming champion – KeMalito
Date	Winner	Event/Show	Note(s)

CMLL World Women's Championship
Incoming champion – Mercedes Moné
Date	Winner	Event/Show	Note(s)
March 6	Persephone	La Noche de La Amazonas	

CMLL Japan Women's Championship
Incoming champion – Hazuki
Date	Winner	Event/Show	Note(s)
March 15	India Sioux	Stardom Cinderella Tournament Final	This was a Stardom event.

CMLL World Tag Team Championship
Incoming champions – Los Hermanos Chavez (Ángel de Oro and Niebla Roja)
Date	Winner	Event/Show	Note(s)

CMLL Arena Coliseo Tag Team Championship
Incoming champions – Los Villanos (El Hijo del Villano III and Villano III Jr.)
Date	Winner	Event/Show	Note(s)
April 4	Los Hermanos Calavera (Calavera Jr. I and Calavera Jr. II)	Arena Coliseo 83rd Anniversary Show	

CMLL Arena Puebla Tag Team Championship
(Titles created)
Date	Winner	Event/Show	Note(s)
July 13	Meyer and Tiger Boy	Lunes Clásico	Defeated Konjuro and Rey Espartano in a tournament final to become the inaugural champions.

CMLL World Women's Tag Team Championship
Incoming champions – Las Chicas Indomables (La Jarochita and Lluvia)
Date	Winner	Event/Show	Note(s)

CMLL World Trios Championship
Incoming champions – El Sky Team (Místico, Máscara Dorada, and Neón)
Date	Winner	Event/Show	Note(s)

NWA World Historic Light Heavyweight Championship
Incoming champion – Atlantis Jr.
Date	Winner	Event/Show	Note(s)
February 26	Averno	Fantastica Mania; Night 4	Co-promoted with New Japan Pro-Wrestling (NJPW).

NWA World Historic Middleweight Championship
Incoming champion – Flip Gordon
Date	Winner	Event/Show	Note(s)
July 3	Volador Jr.	Viernes Espectacular	

NWA World Historic Welterweight Championship
Incoming champion – Máscara Dorada
Date	Winner	Event/Show	Note(s)

Mexican National Heavyweight Championship
Incoming champion – Akuma
Date	Winner	Event/Show	Note(s)

Mexican National Light Heavyweight Championship
Incoming champion – Esfinge
Date	Winner	Event/Show	Note(s)
September 25	Vegas Depredador	Noche de Campeones	

Mexican National Middleweight Championship
Incoming champion – Guerrero Maya Jr.
Date	Winner	Event/Show	Note(s)
September 25	Rey Pegasus	Noche de Campeones	

Mexican National Welterweight Championship
Incoming champion – Magia Blanca
Date	Winner	Event/Show	Note(s)
March 31	Capitán Suicida	Martes Populares	

Mexican National Lightweight Championship
Incoming champion – Rayo Metálico
Date	Winner	Event/Show	Note(s)
March 23	Calavera Jr. I	Lunes Clásico	

Mexican National Women's Championship
Incoming champion – India Sioux
Date	Winner	Event/Show	Note(s)
July 31	Thunder Rosa	Viernes Espectacular	

Mexican National Tag Team Championship
Incoming champions – Los Depredadores (Magnus and Rugido)
Date	Winner	Event/Show	Note(s)

Mexican National Women's Tag Team Championship
Incoming champions – Andrómeda and Skadi
Date	Winner	Event/Show	Note(s)
September 25	Las Valientitas (Hera and Olympia)	Noche de Campeones	

Occidente Heavyweight Championship
Incoming champion – Bestia Negra
Date	Winner	Event/Show	Note(s)

Occidente Middleweight Championship
Incoming champion – Zandokan Jr.
Date	Winner	Event/Show	Note(s)

Occidente Women's Championship
Incoming champion – Lluvia
Date	Winner	Event/Show	Note(s)

Occidente Tag Team Championship
Incoming champions – Gallo Jr. and Ráfaga Jr.
Date	Winner	Event/Show	Note(s)

Occidente Women's Tag Team Championship
Incoming champions – Las Infernales (Dark Silueta and Zeuxis)
Date	Winner	Event/Show	Note(s)

Occidente Trios Championship
Incoming champions – Ráfaga, Furia Roja, Guerrero de la Muerte,
Date	Winner	Event/Show	Note(s)

=== The Crash ===
The Crash Heavyweight Championship
Incoming champion – Andrade El Idolo
Date	Winner	Event/Show	Note(s)

The Crash Women's Championship
Incoming champion – Keyra
Date	Winner	Event/Show	Note(s)
February 20	Lady Shadow	The Crash	This was a three-way match also involving La Hija de Gatubela.

The Crash Cruiserweight Championship
Incoming champion – Noisy Boy
Date	Winner	Event/Show	Note(s)

The Crash Junior Championship
Incoming champion – Atomik Star
Date	Winner	Event/Show	Note(s)
March 20	Amnesia Jr.	The Crash	

The Crash Tag Team Championship
Incoming champions – The Good Brothers (Doc Gallows and Karl Anderson)
Date	Winner	Event/Show	Note(s)

=== CZW ===
CZW World Heavyweight Championship
Incoming champion – Eran Ashe
Date	Winner	Event/Show	Note(s)
June 27	Akira	Tangled Web	
July 18	Eran Ashe	Blacklight 6	

CZW World Tag Team Championship
Incoming champions – The Lost Boys (Athan Promise and Miles Penn)
Date	Winner	Event/Show	Note(s)
February 28	Post Game (Mike Walker and Vinny Talotta)	CZW Blacklight	
June 27	Vacated	Tangled Web	Post Game were stripped of the titles due to a lack of defenses.
TBD	TBD	TBD	This will be a tournament final for the vacant titles.

CZW Ultraviolent Underground Championship
(Title reinstated)
Date	Winner	Event/Show	Note(s)
March 1	Shlak	CZW 27th Anniversary: Deej and Rick's Ultraviolent Adventure	Defeated Nick Gage, Jimmy Lloyd, Lucky 13, Eric Ryan, and Hoodfoot in an Ultraviolent elimination deathmatch to win the vacant title. The title had been inactive since 2012.

=== DEFY ===
DEFY World Championship
Incoming champion – Bryan Keith
Date	Winner	Event/Show	Note(s)

DEFY Women's Championship
Incoming champion – Marina Shafir
Date	Winner	Event/Show	Note(s)

DEFY PrimoLucha Championship
Incoming champion – Kevin Blackwood
Date	Winner	Event/Show	Note(s)
February 20	Vacated		The title was rendered vacant after Kevin Blackwood retired from professional wrestling.
October 1	Trey Miguel	All Heart	Defeated Alan Angels, Gringo Loco, Lio Rush, Jason Hotch, Isaiah Broner, Amazanga, and Charles Crowley in an eight-person elimination match; the title was subsequently renamed DEFY Lucha International Championship.

DEFY Pacific Northwest Heavyweight Championship
Incoming champion – Guillermo Rosas
Date	Winner	Event/Show	Note(s)

DEFY Tag Team Championship
Incoming champions – Sinner and Saint (Judas Icarus and Travis Williams)
Date	Winner	Event/Show	Note(s)

=== DG ===
Open the Dream Gate Championship
Incoming champion – Madoka Kikuta
Date	Winner	Event/Show	Note(s)
July 20	Kzy	Kobe Pro-Wrestling Festival	
October 2	Yoshiki Kato	The Gate Of Victory	

Open the Brave Gate Championship
Incoming champion – Ryoya Tanaka
Date	Winner	Event/Show	Note(s)
September 12	Dragon Kid	Tokio Infinity hPa	
September 20	Vacated	Tohoku Dragongate Way	The championship was vacated due to the circumstances surrounding the ending to Dragon Kid's defense against Ryu Fuda. Fuda defeated Kid with the assistance of Ishin, leading to Ryo Saito voiding the title change and vacating the championship.
November 5	Homare	The Gate Of Evolution 2026	Defeated Dragon Kid in a tournament final to win the vacant title.

Open the Twin Gate Championship
Incoming champions – Love & Peace (Jacky Kamei and Riiita)
Date	Winner	Event/Show	Note(s)
May 23	Gajadokuro (Ishin and Yoshiki Kato)	Hopeful Gate; Night 11: BxB Hulk & Kzy Homecoming	This was also contested for Kamei and Riiita's Sou Ryuo Tag Team Championship.
November 15	Paradox (Kagetora and Susumu Yokosuka)	The Gate Of Evolution; Night 2	Kagetora and Yokosuka previously won the titles as Jimmyz (Jimmy Kagetora and Jimmy Susumu).

Open the Triangle Gate Championship
Incoming champions – Love & Peace (Ben-K, Hyo, and Mochizuki Jr.)
Date	Winner	Event/Show	Note(s)
February 23	Natural Vibes (Kzy, GuC, and Key)	Uno! Dos!! Tres!!!	This was a three-way tag team elimination match also involving Paradox (BxB Hulk, Dragon Kid, and Yamato).
May 17	Churaumi Saver, Gurukun Mask, and Teelan Shisa	Menso-re Gate; Night 2	
June 8	Vacated	–	
July 20	Love And Peace (Hyo, Jacky Kamei and Riiita)	Kobe Pro-Wrestling Festival	Defeated Natural Vibes (GuC, Strong Machine J and U-T) to win the vacant titles.
November 5	XenisS (El Cielo, Kota Minoura and Yuki Yoshioka)	The Gate Of Evolution 2026	

Open the Owarai Gate Championship
Incoming champion – Vacant
Date	Winner	Event/Show	Note(s)
February 20	Otoko Sakari	Truth Gate; Night 8	Defeated Jiro Shinbashi to win the vacant title.
February 20	Vacated	Truth Gate; Night 8	Sakari immediately relinquished the title.
February 28	Yosuke ♡ Santa Maria	Glorious Gate; Night 1	Defeated Jiro Shinbashi to win the vacant title.
May 31	Shin Sakura Hirota	Marvelous	This was a Marvelous That's Women Pro Wrestling event. Hirota became the first female wrestler to hold the title.

=== Diana ===
World Woman Pro-Wrestling Diana World Championship
Incoming champion – Vacant
Date	Winner	Event/Show	Note(s)
January 24	Debbie Keitel	Diana 15th Anniversary No. 1	Defeated Nanami Hatano to win the vacant title.
April 19	Haruka Umesaki	Diana Season 2 – 2nd Leg 15th Anniversary NO. 2	

World Woman Pro-Wrestling Diana Queen Elizabeth Championship
Incoming champion – Vacant
Date	Winner	Event/Show	Note(s)
January 24	Ayako Sato	Diana 15th Anniversary No. 1	Defeated Kaori Yoneyama and Yumi Ohka to win the vacant title.
August 1	Yumi Ohka	Wave Nami 1	This was a Pro Wrestling Wave event. Also involving Mochi Natsumi.

World Woman Pro-Wrestling Diana Crystal Championship
Incoming champion – Miran
Date	Winner	Event/Show	Note(s)

World Woman Pro-Wrestling Diana Tag Team Championship
Incoming champion – Vacant
Date	Winner	Event/Show	Note(s)
January 24	Chobuki (Haruka Umesaki and Unagi Sayaka)	Diana 15th Anniversary No. 1	Defeated Olympia and Miran to win the vacant titles.
July 5	Ayaka (Ayako Sato and Hanako Nakamori)	Diana Season 3 – 1st Leg 15th Anniversary No. 3	

=== DPW ===
DPW Worlds Championship
Incoming champion – LaBron Kozone
Date	Winner	Event/Show	Note(s)

DPW Women's Worlds Championship
Incoming champion – Mei Suruga
Date	Winner	Event/Show	Note(s)

DPW National Championship
Incoming champion – LaBron Kozone
Date	Winner	Event/Show	Note(s)

DPW Worlds Tag Team Championship
Incoming champions – Miracle Generation (Dustin Walker and Kylon King)
Date	Winner	Event/Show	Note(s)

=== EVE ===
Pro-Wrestling: EVE Championship
Incoming champion – Rhio
Date	Winner	Event/Show	Note(s)
March 8	Session Moth Martina	EVE 146: Wrestle Queendom VIII	After Martina won the title, it was renamed to the Pro-Wrestling: EVE World Championship.

Pro-Wrestling: EVE International Championship
Incoming champion – Kris Statlander
Date	Winner	Event/Show	Note(s)
June 5	Miyu Yamashita	EVE 150: History Makers/Rule Breakers!	

Pro-Wrestling: EVE Tag Team Championship
Incoming champions – Lallie (Hollie Barlow and Lana Austin)
Date	Winner	Event/Show	Note(s)
June 5	French Art (Cory Zero and JGU)	EVE 150: History Makers/Rule Breakers!	
November 6	Vacated	EVE 156: EVE For Vendetta	The title was relinquished due to Cory Zero not being medically cleared to compete.
November 6	Hyperactive (Safire Reed and Anita Vaughan)	EVE 156: EVE For Vendetta	This was a three-way tag team match also involving Nyte Skye (Skye Smitson and Violet Nyte) and Hai High Mate (Maika and Hanako)
November 8	Hai High Mate (Maika and Hanako)	Elite Encounters II	

Spirit Of EVE Championship
Incoming champions – Title created
Date	Winner	Event/Show	Note(s)
August 28	Lucy Deathmatch	EVE 153: EVE x The World 2	Defeated Emersyn Jayne and Skye Blue to become the inaugural champion.

=== Freedoms ===
King of Freedom World Championship
Incoming champion – Violento Jack
Date	Winner	Event/Show	Note(s)
August 20 (aired September 6)	Tomoya Hirata	Freedoms/Jun Kasai Produce Tokyo Death Match Carnival Vol. 2	This was a Glass Board and Light Tubes Deathmatch.

King of Freedom World Junior Heavyweight Championship
Incoming champion – Kengo
Date	Winner	Event/Show	Note(s)
March 26	Gaia Hox	The Gekokujo	
September 6	Yuya Susumu	Freedoms/Jun Kasai Produce Tokyo Death Match Carnival Vol. 2	

King of Freedom World Tag Team Championship
Incoming champions – Masashi Takeda and Yusaku Ito
Date	Winner	Event/Show	Note(s)
January 23	Jun Kasai and Mizuki Watase	Reach for the Star	This was a Fluorescent Light Tubes Deathmatch.
August 12	X-Trail (Kyu Mogami and Toru Sugiura)	Freedoms/Jun Kasai Produce Shinkaba Death Match Carnival Vol. 2	This was a Fluorescent Light Tubes Deathmatch.

Barefoot King Championship
Incoming champion – Daisuke Masaoka
Date	Winner	Event/Show	Note(s)
≤ February 12	Takayuki Ueki	N/A	The exact circumstances in which Ueki won the championship are uncertain. He was billed as champion at Go Beyond the Limit on February 12, 2026.
February 12	Kota Sekifuda	Go Beyond the Limit	This was a Barefoot Toy Block Death dark match.
February 12	Vacated	Go Beyond the Limit	Sekifuda vacated the title immediately after winning it.
May 31	Yuji Hino	Deathmatch Festival	Defeated Takayuki Ueki in a Barefoot Toy Block Deathmatch to win the vacant title.
May 31	Vacated	Deathmatch Festival	Hino was originally scheduled to be the special guest referee for the match, as Ueki was set to face "Kumamoto X" for the title. However, Hino was revealed as Kumamoto X and faced Ueki instead; Hino vacated the title immediately after winning it.
July 9 (aired July 16)	Mizuki Watase	Freedoms/Jun Kasai Produce Tokyo Death Match Carnival Vol. 1	Defeated Takayuki Ueki in a Barefoot Toy Block Deathmatch to win the vacant title.
July 9 (aired July 16)	Vacated	Freedoms/Jun Kasai Produce Tokyo Death Match Carnival Vol. 1	Watase vacated the title immediately after winning it due to also being a co-holder of the King of Freedom World Tag Team Championship.
July 30	Takashi Sasaki	Freedoms/Jun Kasai Produce Shinkaba Death Match Carnival Vol. 1	Defeated Takayuki Ueki in a Barefoot Cat Repellent Sheet Deathmatch to win the vacant title.

=== GanPro ===
Spirit of Ganbare World Openweight Championship
Incoming champion – Masaaki Mochizuki
Date	Winner	Event/Show	Note(s)
February 22 (aired February 26)	Mizuki Watase	A Scanner Darkly	

Spirit of Ganbare World Tag Team Championship
Incoming champions – Yumehito Imanari and Shinichiro Tominaga
Date	Winner	Event/Show	Note(s)
April 29 (aired May 5)	The Deadlock (Takuya Wada and Tyson Maeguchi)	Ganbare Pro 13th Anniversary ~ Mad Max	
August 16 (aired August 20)	Shuichiro Katsumura and Yuya Susumu	It's a Summer Film!	

=== GCW ===
GCW World Championship
Incoming champion – Atticus Cogar
Date	Winner	Event/Show	Note(s)
August 15	Joseph Sawyer	Homecoming Weekend; Night 1	
November 7	Atticus Cogar	The Crossroads	This was a No Rules match.

GCW Ultraviolent Championship
Incoming champion – Matt Tremont
Date	Winner	Event/Show	Note(s)
January 17	Otis Cogar	Code of the Streets	This was a deathmatch.
April 18	Matt Tremont	Joey Janela's Spring Break: The Immortal Clusterfuck	This was a Hardcore Kingdom Steel Cage match.
June 7	Otis Cogar	Cage of Survival 5	This was a Cage of Survival match also involving Masashi Takeda, Jimmy Lloyd, Lucky 13, Anakin Murphy, Conor Claxton, Jefferey John, Lil Sicko, Jameson Shook, Dr. Redacted, Gabby Forza, and Vipress.
September 12	Vipress	No Signal in The Hills Pt. 5	

GCW World Tag Team Championship
Incoming champions – Bustah and The Brain (Alec Price and Jordan Oliver)
Date	Winner	Event/Show	Note(s)
August 15	KJ Orso and Sam Stackhouse	Homecoming Weekend; Night 1	

JCW World Championship
Incoming champion – Billie Starkz
Date	Winner	Event/Show	Note(s)
February 7	Charles Mason	Jersey J-Cup; Night 2	This was also the finals of the Jersey J-Cup.
October 18	Gabby Forza	A Nightmare in Bergen County	

=== Gleat ===
G-Rex Championship
Incoming champion – El Lindaman
Date	Winner	Event/Show	Note(s)
October 9	Atsushi Kotoge	Gleat Ver. EX ~ Gleat Vs. Kyoteki 2026	

G-Rush Championship
Incoming champion – Minoru Tanaka
Date	Winner	Event/Show	Note(s)
July 2	Soma Watanabe	The Beginning of the 6th Year	This was a three-way elimination match also involving Brass Knuckles Jun.
October 16	Van Vert Jack	Gleat G Group Members Only Event	

G-Infinity Championship
Incoming champions – Black Generation International (Kaito Ishida and Kazma Sakamoto)
Date	Winner	Event/Show	Note(s)
August 3	Quiet Storm and Ryuichi Kawakami	Sayonara Face	
September 18	Chris Ridgeway and Drew Parker	Underground Pro Wrestling 1st Season	
September 20	G. Sharpe and TJP	Gleat Ver. 31	
October 9	Black Generation International (So Daimonji and Soma Watanabe)	Gleat Ver. EX ~ Gleat Vs. Kyoteki 2026	

Lidet UWF World Championship
Incoming champion – Katsuhiko Nakajima
Date	Winner	Event/Show	Note(s)
March 8	Soma Watanabe	Gleat Lidet UWF Ver. 8	
April 8	Takanori Ito	Gleat Ver. 24	

=== GWF ===
GWF World Championship
Incoming champion – Rambo
Date	Winner	Event/Show	Note(s)
February 6	Andrade El Ídolo	Global Warning	
April 19	Ahura	Mystery Mayhem	
November 1	Rotten Moodo	Legacy 31	This was Moodo's Chaos Key championship match

GWF Women's World Championship
Incoming champion – Jane Nero
Date	Winner	Event/Show	Note(s)
May 10	Violet Nyte	World Cup	This was a three-way match also involving Sultan Suzu.
November 1	Orsi	Legacy 31	This was a three-way match also involving Jane Nero.

GWF Berlin Championship
Incoming champion – Carlito
Date	Winner	Event/Show	Note(s)
January 11	Ahura	Strike First, Strike Hard	
February 6	Kouga	Global Warning	
April 19	Toni Harting	Mystery Mayhem	
September 6	Max Feifel	Battlefield	

GWF Tag Team Championship
Incoming champions – Sunshine Machine (Chuck Mambo and TK Cooper)
Date	Winner	Event/Show	Note(s)
May 10	Blutsbrüder (Erkan Sulcani and Evil Jared)	World Cup	This was a four-way tag team match also involving Blutsbrüder Prospects (D-Nice and Georg Asgolar) and A Bite of Baklava (Aytac Bahar and Joshua Amaru).
September 6	The Royal Throne (Sorani and Kourosh Bohemian)	Battlefield	This was a three-way tag team match also involving Quick and Dirty (Niklas Rock and Hugo Brand).
November 1	A Bite of Baklava (Aytaç Bahar and Joshua Amaru)	Legacy 31	

GWF Mixed Tag Team Championship
Incoming champions – Joshua Amaru and Cory Zero
Date	Winner	Event/Show	Note(s)
April 19	The Royal Throne (Sorani and Sultan Suzu)	Mystery Mayhem	
July 12	Blutsbrüder (Georg Asgolar and Jane Nero)	Summer Smash	

=== HOG ===
HOG Heavyweight Championship
Incoming champion – Charles Mason
Date	Winner	Event/Show	Note(s)
August 7	Joey Silver	High Intensity	This was Silver's Matt Travis Memorial contract cash-in match

HOG Women's Championship
Incoming champion – Shotzi Blackheart
Date	Winner	Event/Show	Note(s)

HOG Crown Jewel Championship
Incoming champion – Zilla Fatu
Date	Winner	Event/Show	Note(s)
August 7	Amazing Red	High Intensity	

HOG Cruiserweight Championship
Incoming champion – Daron Richardson
Date	Winner	Event/Show	Note(s)
August 7	Lio Rush	High Intensity	This was a No Holds Barred match.

HOG Tag Team Championship
Incoming champions – The Hardys (Matt Hardy and Jeff Hardy)
Date	Winner	Event/Show	Note(s)

LPW Heavyweight Championship
Incoming champion – Jodi Aura
Date	Winner	Event/Show	Note(s)

LPW Women's Championship
Incoming champion – Amiira Sahar
Date	Winner	Event/Show	Note(s)

LPW Tag Team Championship
Incoming champions – Dual Focus (JJP and KB Prime)
Date	Winner	Event/Show	Note(s)

=== Ice Ribbon ===
ICE×∞ Championship
Incoming champion – Kaho Matsushita
Date	Winner	Event/Show	Note(s)
August 9	Sumika Yanagawa	New Ice Ribbon #1507	

FantastICE Championship
Incoming champion – Tsukina Umino
Date	Winner	Event/Show	Note(s)

Triangle Ribbon Championship
Incoming champion – Kaori Yoneyama
Date	Winner	Event/Show	Note(s)
January 1	Miran	Gokigen Pro Wrestling in Ita #6 Oshogatsu	This was a Gokigen Pro Wrestling event. Also involved Chie Ozora.
March 14	Cherry	Gokigen Pro Gokigen Amistad #20	This was a Gokigen Pro Wrestling event. Also involved Matsuzawa-san.
April 6	Kaori Yoneyama	Gokigen Pro Gokigen Amistad #21	This was a Gokigen Pro Wrestling event. Yoneyama won the title post main-event, during a series of games involving all participants in the show.
April 6	Makoto	Gokigen Pro Gokigen Amistad #21	This was a Gokigen Pro Wrestling event. Makoto won the title post main-event, during a series of games involving all participants in the show.
May 30	Akane Fujita	New Ice Ribbon #1492	This was a three-way match also involving Tsukina Umino.
June 20	Vacated	New Ice Ribbon #1496 Hataage 20th Anniversary	The championship was vacated when Akane Fujita's title defense against Tsukina Umino and Arisa Shinose ended in a fifteen-minute time limit-draw. The match was also disputed for Umino's FantastICE Championship.
July 26	Hikari Minami	New Ice Ribbon #1504 Yokohama Ribbon – July	Defeated Kaori Yoneyama and Mase Hiiro to win the vacant title.
November 8	Kaho Matsushita	New Ice Ribbon #1526	This was a three-way match also involving Yuuka

International Ribbon Tag Team Championship
Incoming champions – Victoria Pinky (Manami Katsu and Misa Kagura)
Date	Winner	Event/Show	Note(s)
February 23	Mystic Eclipse (Makoto and Sumika Yanagawa)	New Ice Ribbon #1476 Yokohama Ribbon	
August 30	Hikari&Manami (Hikari Minami and Manami Katsu)	New Ice Ribbon #1511 Yokohama Ribbon	

=== IWRG ===
IWRG Intercontinental Heavyweight Championship
Incoming champion – DMT Azul
Date	Winner	Event/Show	Note(s)

IWRG Intercontinental Middleweight Championship
Incoming champion – Toxin
Date	Winner	Event/Show	Note(s)
April 19	Flamita	Guerra del Golfo	

IWRG Intercontinental Welterweight Championship
Incoming champion – Caballero de Plata
Date	Winner	Event/Show	Note(s)
N/A	Vacated	N/A	The reason or date the title was vacated is unknown.
May 7	Hip Hop Man	IWRG Thursday Night Wrestling	This was a ten-man elimination match in which Hip Hop Man last pinned Nicolas Richard to win the vacant title.
June 17	Caballero de Plata	IWRG Wednesday Night Wrestling	This was a five-way match also involving Jasper Faster, Pablo Rivas, and Tirano.

IWRG Intercontinental Lightweight Championship
Incoming champion – Aguila Roja
Date	Winner	Event/Show	Note(s)

IWRG Intercontinental Women's Championship
Incoming champion – Lady Maravilla
Date	Winner	Event/Show	Note(s)
February 22	Vacated	El Protector	Lady Maravilla was unavailable to defend the title due to being booked on a show in California the same night.
February 22	Sagittarius	El Protector	Defeated Big Mami, Candy Swing, Diosa Quetzal, Hahastary, Krissta, and Lilith Dark in a seven-way match to win the vacant title.

IWRG Intercontinental Tag Team Championship
Incoming champions – Mexa Boy's (Noisy Boy and Spider Fly)
Date	Winner	Event/Show	Note(s)

IWRG Intercontinental Trios Championship
Incoming champions – Revolución Crew (El Hijo de Canis Lupus, Multifacetico Jr., and Rey Mictlan)
Date	Winner	Event/Show	Note(s)

IWRG Junior de Juniors Championship
Incoming champion – Villano V Jr.
Date	Winner	Event/Show	Note(s)

IWRG Rey del Ring Championship
Incoming champion – Hell Boy
Date	Winner	Event/Show	Note(s)
June 7	Vito Fratelli	IWRG	This was a three-way match also involving Jack Morris.

IWRG Rey del Aire Championship
Incoming champion – Hysteriosis
Date	Winner	Event/Show	Note(s)

IWRG Mexico Championship
Incoming champion – Hell Boy
Date	Winner	Event/Show	Note(s)
May 17	Jack Morris	IWRG	This was a three-way elimination match also involving Flamita.

Distrito Federal Trios Championship
Incoming champions – El Infierno Eterno (Demonio Infernal, Eterno, and Lunatic Extreme)
Date	Winner	Event/Show	Note(s)

=== JCW ===
JCW World Heavyweight Championship
Incoming champion – Matt Cardona
Date	Winner	Event/Show	Note(s)
January 17	Vacated	–	The title was vacated after Cardona signed with WWE.
January 18 (aired February 5)	Mr. Anderson	JCW Lunacy	Defeated James Storm to win the vacant title.
February 28	CoKane	Juggalo Weekend; Night 2	
May 24 (aired June 18)	Caleb Konley	JCW Lunacy	

JCW Women's Championship
Incoming champion – "HollyHood" Haley J
Date	Winner	Event/Show	Note(s)
March 20 (aired April 9)	Alice Crowley	JCW Lunacy	
April 17	J-Rod	Strangle-Mania: Viva Las Violence	This was a tag team match where J-Rod teamed with Nyla Rose against Crowley and Dani Mo, with Katie Forbes serving as the special guest referee. Whoever secured the winning pinfall would win the title; J-Rod pinned Mo.
May 24 (aired June 18)	Dani Mo	JCW Lunacy	This was a ladder match.

JCW American Championship
Incoming champion – Ninja Mack
Date	Winner	Event/Show	Note(s)
January 16 (aired January 29)	Façade	JCW Lunacy	This was the third match in a Best of Three Series.
June 19 (aired June 25)	Father Bronson	JCW Lunacy	

JCW Battle Royal Championship
Incoming champion – Kerry Morton
Date	Winner	Event/Show	Note(s)
August 20	Kongo Kong	Gathering of the Juggalos	Last eliminated Bruce Wayans in a battle royal to win the title.

JCW Tag Team Championship
Incoming champions – Brothers of Funstruction (Yabo the Clown and Ruffo the Clown)
Date	Winner	Event/Show	Note(s)
February 20 (aired March 5)	Luciano Family Enterprises (PCO and Mickie Knuckles)	JCW Lunacy	
February 21 (aired March 12)	The JWO (2 Tuff Tony and Willie Mack)	JCW Lunacy	On June 18, Tony and Mack reformed The JWO with Violent J, but only the former two continued to defend the titles.
June 20 (aired July 2)	Choppa City (Atiba and Bruce Wayans)	JCW Lunacy	

=== JTO ===
King of JTO
Incoming champion – Ryuya Takekura
Date	Winner	Event/Show	Note(s)
March 6	Ibuki	JTO	
June 26	Vacated	–	
August 11	Yukimitsu Takahashi	JTO Special	Defeated Ryuya Takekura in a tournament final to win the vacant title.

Queen of JTO
Incoming champion – Azusa Inaba
Date	Winner	Event/Show	Note(s)
October 10	Aoi	JTO	

JTO Openweight Championship
Incoming champion – Ibuki
Date	Winner	Event/Show	Note(s)
January 4	Bomber Tatsuya	First Show of the Year	
August 11	Naoya Akama	JTO Special	

JTO Girls Championship
Incoming champion – Mirai
Date	Winner	Event/Show	Note(s)
July 10	Tomoka Inaba	JTO 7th Anniversary	
August 28	Vacated	N/A	
August 29	Azusa Inaba	JTO	

JTO Tag Team Championship
Incoming champions – Myo-o (Genta Yubari and Miyamasa)
Date	Winner	Event/Show	Note(s)
September 21	Kentaro Hachisu and Yumehito Imanari	JTO Special	
October 10	Bomber Tatsuya and Ryuya Takekura	JTO	
November 9	Myo-o (Genta Yubari and Takobutsu)	JTO West Japan Winter Tour	Takobutsu was previously known as Keita.

JTO Girls Tag Team Championship
Incoming champions – Tomoka Inaba and Rhythm
Date	Winner	Event/Show	Note(s)
February 15	Big Fusion (Aoi and HisokA)	JTO	
April 5	1111 (Misa Kagura and Sumika Yanagawa)	JTO Special	
July 10	Big Fusion (Big Haruka and Jumbo Inoue)	JTO 7th Anniversary	This was a four-way tag team match also involving Aoi and Michicko, and Mizuha and Luvlica Hinano.
October 10	Tomoka Inaba and Mirai	JTO	

UWA World Middleweight Championship
Incoming champion – Naoya Akama
Date	Winner	Event/Show	Note(s)

Independent World Junior Heavyweight Championship
Incoming champion – Akira Jumonji
Date	Winner	Event/Show	Note(s)
January 4	Kuroshio Tokyo Japan	First Show of the Year	
March 14	Megaton	Marigold Spring Victory Series; Night 2	First time the title changed hands at a Marigold event.
October 10	Momoka Hanazono	Marigold Battle Heart 2026 2026	This was a Marigold event.

=== Marigold ===
Marigold World Championship
Incoming champion – Miku Aono
Date	Winner	Event/Show	Note(s)

Marigold United National Championship
Incoming champion – Victoria Yuzuki
Date	Winner	Event/Show	Note(s)

Marigold Super Fly Championship
Incoming champion – Mayu Iwatani
Date	Winner	Event/Show	Note(s)

Marigold Twin Star Championship
Incoming champions – Darkness Revolution (Misa Matsui and Chiaki)
Date	Winner	Event/Show	Note(s)
May 23	tWin toWer (Kouki Amarei and Chika Goto)	Shine Forever	

Marigold 3D Trios Championship
(Title created)
Date	Winner	Event/Show	Note(s)
February 23	La Vie en Rose (Mai Sakurai, Erina Yamanaka, and Natsumi Showzuki)	New Years Golden Garden; Night 12	Defeated Darkness Revolution (Misa Matsui, Nagisa Nozaki, and Rea Sato) in a tournament final to become the inaugural champions.
August 9	Darkness Revolution (Chiaki, Misa Matsui, and Rea Seto)	Summer Destiny	

GHC Women's Championship
Co-promoted with Pro Wrestling Noah
Incoming champion – Takumi Iroha
Date	Winner	Event/Show	Note(s)
January 3	Mayu Iwatani	First Dream	
May 18	Vacated	Noah Monday Magic Inside Out Ep. 1	The title was vacated due to Mayu Iwatani suffering a fractured toe.
June 15	Mirai	Wrestle Magic	Defeated The Great Sakuta to win the vacant title.

=== Marvelous ===
AAAW Single Championship
Incoming champion – Takumi Iroha
Date	Winner	Event/Show	Note(s)

AAAW Tag Team Championship
Incoming champion – Magenta (Maria and Riko Kawahata)
Date	Winner	Event/Show	Note(s)
May 5	Nightshade and Nyla Rose	Marvelous 10th Anniversary Commemorative Event	

=== MLP ===
PWA Champions Grail
Co-promoted with Oceania Pro Wrestling and Qatar Pro Wrestling
Incoming champion – Rohan Raja
Date	Winner	Event/Show	Note(s)
June 13 (aired August 12)	Stu Grayson	MLP Mayhem	This was a Winner Takes All match in which Grayson's interim MLP Canadian Championship was also on the line.

MLP Canadian Championship
Incoming champion – Josh Alexander
Date	Winner	Event/Show	Note(s)
March 28	Stu Grayson (interim)	Uprising	Lineal champion Josh Alexander suffered a knee injury on March 25, requiring surgery, and was unable to defend the title. Grayson last eliminated Jonathan Gresham in a gauntlet match to become the interim champion.

MLP Canadian Women's Championship
Incoming champion – Gisele Shaw
Date	Winner	Event/Show	Note(s)
August 8 (aired September 16)	Priscilla Kelly	MLP Mayhem	

MLP Canadian Tag Team Championship
(Title created)
Date	Winner	Event/Show	Note(s)
March 27	The Good Brothers (Doc Gallows and Karl Anderson)	Global Wars Canada	Co-promoted with Ring of Honor (ROH). Defeated Bryce Hansen and Sheldon Jean, Kaito Kiyomiya and Bishop Dyer, and GOA (Bishop Kaun and Toa Liona) to become the inaugural champions.
March 28	1st Faction (Sheldon Jean and Brent Banks)	Uprising	
October 3	Grizzled Young Veterans (James Drake and Zack Gibson)	Northern Rising	This was a three-way tag team match also involving Sinner and Saint (Judas Icarus and Travis Williams).

=== MLW ===
MLW World Heavyweight Championship
Incoming champion – Mads Krule Krügger
Date	Winner	Event/Show	Note(s)
January 29 (aired February 5)	Killer Kross	Battle Riot VIII	Won the 40-man Battle Riot match by last eliminating Alex Hammerstone and Matt Riddle.
November 7	Josh Bishop	Saturday Night SuperFight	This was a Last Man Standing match.

MLW World Women's Featherweight Championship
Incoming champion – Shoko Nakajima
Date	Winner	Event/Show	Note(s)
February 7 (aired June 6)	Shotzi Blackheart	Lucha Apocalypto	
September 12 (airing TBC)	Masha	Fusion	

MLW World Middleweight Championship
Incoming champion – Templario
Date	Winner	Event/Show	Note(s)
January 29 (aired February 5)	Kushida	Battle Riot VIII	
May 1	Templario	CMLL Viernes Espectacular	This was a Consejo Mundial de Lucha Libre show.

MLW National Openweight Championship
Incoming champion – Blue Panther
Date	Winner	Event/Show	Note(s)
February 7 (aired June 20)	Austin Aries	Lucha Apocalypto	
November 8 (airing TBC)	Matt Riddle	Lucha de los Muertos	

MLW World Tag Team Championship
Incoming champions – The Skyscrapers (Donovan Dijak, Bishop Dyer, and Josh Bishop)
Dijak and Dyer originally won the titles. At the March 14 MLW Fusion taping, Josh Bishop was introduced as the newest member of The Skyscrapers, with the trio defending the titles under the Freebird Rule.
Date	Winner	Event/Show	Note(s)
May 9 (aired August 15)	The Good Brothers (Doc Gallows and Karl Anderson)	Fusion	Defeated Dijak and Dyer, who represented The Skyscrapers, in a Tennessee Tornado match to win the titles.

MLW Southern Crown Championship
(Title created)
Date	Winner	Event/Show	Note(s)
March 14 (aired July 4)	Trevor Lee	Fusion	Defeated Matthew Justice, Paul Walter Hauser, Festus, Ikuro Kwon, Andrew Everett, Jesús Rodriguez, Diego Hill, Josh Bishop, and The Beastman in a Bunkhouse Stampede to become the inaugural champion.
June 13 (aired TBD)	Joe Coffey	Fusion	
October 3 (aired TBD)	LaBron Kozone	Slaughterhouse	

=== M-Pro ===
Tohoku Junior Heavyweight Championship
Incoming champion – Pantera Jr.
Date	Winner	Event/Show	Note(s)
March 21	Musashi	33rd Anniversary ~ Mutsu Shunto	
June 12 (aired June 20)	Sangre Azteca Jr.	Michinoku 2026 Tokyo Conference Vol. 1 ~ VIVA!MEXICO! ~	

Tohoku Tag Team Championship
Incoming champions – Demonios (Arashi and Yasutaka Oosera)
Date	Winner	Event/Show	Note(s)
November 1	Marukan Softman and Mask de Coppe	Michinoku Pro Grande Dos 2026	

=== NJPW ===
IWGP World Heavyweight Championship
Incoming champion – Konosuke Takeshita
Date	Winner	Event/Show	Note(s)
January 4	Yota Tsuji	Wrestle Kingdom 20	This was a Winner Takes All match also for Tsuji's IWGP Global Heavyweight Championship.
January 5	Deactivated	New Year Dash!!	Tsuji reintroduced the IWGP Heavyweight Championship—which had been retired in 2021 and succeeded by the World Heavyweight—to replace the World Heavyweight, retroactively merging the lineages of both titles as one, with all former IWGP World Heavyweight Champions recognized as former IWGP Heavyweight Champions.

IWGP Heavyweight Championship
(Title reintroduced)
Date	Winner	Event/Show	Note(s)
January 5	Yota Tsuji	New Year Dash!!	Tsuji reintroduced the title—which had been retired in 2021 and succeeded by the IWGP World Heavyweight Championship—to replace the World Heavyweight, retroactively merging the lineages of both titles as one, with all former IWGP World Heavyweight Champions recognized as former IWGP Heavyweight Champions.
April 4	Callum Newman	Sakura Genesis	
June 14	Yota Tsuji	Dominion 6.14 in Osaka-jo Hall	

IWGP Global Heavyweight Championship
Incoming champion – Yota Tsuji
Date	Winner	Event/Show	Note(s)
May 3	Andrade El Ídolo	Wrestling Dontaku; Night 1	
June 14	Shota Umino	Dominion 6.14 in Osaka-jo Hall	This was a three-way match also involving Drilla Moloney.
July 6	Gabe Kidd	Road to G1 Climax 36; Night 6	

IWGP Junior Heavyweight Championship
Incoming champion – Douki
Date	Winner	Event/Show	Note(s)
June 14	Yoh	Dominion 6.14 in Osaka-jo Hall	

IWGP Women's Championship
Incoming champion – Syuri
Co-promoted with World Wonder Ring Stardom
Date	Winner	Event/Show	Note(s)

IWGP Tag Team Championship
Incoming champions – Knock Out Brothers (Yuto-Ice and Oskar)
Date	Winner	Event/Show	Note(s)
June 14	United Empire (Henare and Great-O-Khan)	Dominion 6.14 in Osaka-jo Hall	
October 6	Knock Out Brothers (Yuto-Ice and Oskar)	Road to King of Pro-Wrestling; Night 1	

IWGP Junior Heavyweight Tag Team Championship
Incoming champions – House of Torture (Douki and Sho)
Date	Winner	Event/Show	Note(s)
January 5	Ichiban Sweet Boys (Robbie Eagles and Kosei Fujita)	New Year Dash	This was a four-way tag team match also involving El Desperado and Kuukai, and Super Extremes (Taiji Ishimori and Robbie X).
March 6	Super Extremes (Taiji Ishimori and Robbie X)	54th Anniversary Show	
April 25	Ichiban Sweet Boys (Robbie Eagles and Kosei Fujita)	Wrestling Redzone in Hiroshima	
May 4	El Desperado and Mistico	Wrestling Dontaku; Night 2	
November 3	Vacated	Power Struggle	Desperado and Místico relinquished the title due to Desperado being diagnosed with spinal canal stenosis and a hernia injury.

NEVER Openweight Championship
Incoming champion – Evil
Date	Winner	Event/Show	Note(s)
January 4	Aaron Wolf	Wrestle Kingdom 20	
February 11	Ren Narita	The New Beginning in Osaka	

NEVER Openweight 6-Man Tag Team Championship
Incoming champions – Toru Yano and Spiritech (Master Wato and Yoh)
Date	Winner	Event/Show	Note(s)
January 4	TMDK (Zack Sabre Jr., Ryohei Oiwa, and Hartley Jackson)	Wrestle Kingdom 20	Won a Tornado Ranbo by last eliminating Boltin Oleg and Bishamon (Hirooki Goto and Yoshi-Hashi).
January 19	Bishamon-tin (Boltin Oleg, Hirooki Goto and Yoshi-Hashi)	Road to the New Beginning; Night 1	
May 4	United Empire (Will Ospreay, Henare, and Great-O-Khan)	Wrestling Dontaku; Night 2	
October 12	Unbound Co. (Yuto-Ice, Oskar, and Jeff Cobb)	King of Pro-Wrestling	

NJPW World Television Championship
Incoming champion – El Phantasmo
Date	Winner	Event/Show	Note(s)
February 27	Konosuke Takeshita	The New Beginning USA	
September 27	Shun Skywalker	Destruction in Kobe	
November 19	Toru Yano	Tanahashi Jam 2	

Strong Openweight Championship
Incoming champion – Tomohiro Ishii
Date	Winner	Event/Show	Note(s)
February 27	Boltin Oleg	The New Beginning USA	

Strong Women's Championship
Incoming champion – Saya Kamitani
Co-promoted with World Wonder Ring Stardom
Date	Winner	Event/Show	Note(s)
January 4	Syuri	Wrestle Kingdom 20	This was a Winner Takes All match also for Syuri's IWGP Women's Championship.
March 8	Alex Windsor	EVE 146: Wrestle Queendom VIII	This was a Pro-Wrestling: EVE show.

Strong Openweight Tag Team Championship
Incoming champions – Los Hermanos Chavez (Ángel de Oro and Niebla Roja)
Date	Winner	Event/Show	Note(s)

Tamashii Tag Team Championship
Incoming champions – The Pretty Boys (Magic Mark and Pretty Richie)
Date	Winner	Event/Show	Note(s)
May 16	Ungrateful 1s (TJ Illes and Trent Hooper)	Mayhem	

=== NWA ===
NWA Worlds Heavyweight Championship
Incoming champion – "Thrillbilly" Silas Mason
Date	Winner	Event/Show	Note(s)

NWA World Women's Championship
Incoming champion – Natalia Markova
Date	Winner	Event/Show	Note(s)
April 4 (aired April 16)	Tiffany Nieves	Crockett Cup	This was Nieves' Burke Invitational Gauntlet cash-in match.

NWA National Heavyweight Championship
Incoming champion – Mike Mondo
Date	Winner	Event/Show	Note(s)
June 6 (aired August 15)	Bryan Idol	Hard Times 6	

NWA World Junior Heavyweight Championship
Incoming champion – Spencer Slade
Date	Winner	Event/Show	Note(s)

NWA Mid-America Heavyweight Championship
Incoming champion – Jeremiah Plunkett
Date	Winner	Event/Show	Note(s)

NWA World Television Championship
Incoming champion – Bryan Idol
Date	Winner	Event/Show	Note(s)
February 21 (aired March 17)	Vacated	NWA Powerrr	Idol voluntarily vacated the title to challenge "Thrillbilly" Silas Mason for the NWA Worlds Heavyweight Championship as part of the "Lucky Seven Rule".
April 25 (aired June 6)	Alex Misery	NWA Powerrr	Defeated Lockjaw Drake, Daisy Kill, Wrecking Ball Legursky, and JAC in a five-way scramble to win the vacant title.

NWA World Women's Television Championship
Incoming champion – Tiffany Nieves
Date	Winner	Event/Show	Note(s)
April 4 (aired May 1)	Gisele Shaw	Crockett Cup	
July 25 (aired TBD)	Sirena Veil	NWA 78th Anniversary Show	

NWA World Tag Team Championship
Incoming champions – The Immortals (Kratos and Odinson)
Date	Winner	Event/Show	Note(s)
April 25 (aired May 30)	The Country Gentlemen (AJ Cazana and KC Cazana)	NWA Powerrr	

NWA World Women's Tag Team Championship
Incoming champions – The Hex (Allysin Kay and Marti Belle)
Date	Winner	Event/Show	Note(s)
April 25 (aired June 13)	Pretty Empowered (Kenzie Paige and Kylie Paige)	NWA Powerrr	This was a three-way tag team match also involving Clara Carter and "HollyHood" Haley J.

NWA United States Tag Team Championship
Incoming champions – The Slimeballz (Sage Chantz and Tommy Rant)
Date	Winner	Event/Show	Note(s)
June 6 (aired August 1)	The Hardway (Jack Vaughn and Dalton McKenzie)	Hard Times 6	

=== Osaka Pro ===
Osaka Pro Wrestling Championship
Incoming champion – Ryuya Matsufusa
Date	Winner	Event/Show	Note(s)

Osaka Light Heavyweight Championship
Incoming champion – Ultimate Spider Jr.
Date	Winner	Event/Show	Note(s)
July 5	Suzaku	Summer Battle	

Osaka Meibutsu Sekaiichi Championship
Incoming champion – Takoyakida
Date	Winner	Event/Show	Note(s)
March 8 (aired March 9)	Kanjyuro Matsuyama	Bushi-Do	
March 22	Takoyakida	Bushi-Do	This was a four-way match also involving Kuishinbo Kamen and Joichiro Osaka.
April 26	Joichiro Osaka	Osaka Pro 27th Anniversary; Night 2	This was a four-way match also involving Kuishinbo Kamen and Tigers Mask.
July 20	Tigers Mask	Osaka Castle Town Festival	This was a three-way match also involving Ebessan.

Osaka Tag Team Championship
Incoming champions – Aran Sano and Tigers Mask
Date	Winner	Event/Show	Note(s)
June 7 (aired June 8)	Takosupa (Takoyakida and Ultimate Spider Jr.)	Ultimate Spider Jr. 20th Anniversary & Takoyakida 21st Anniversary	
July 20	Rogue Nation (Shu Asakawa and Toru)	Osaka Castle Town Festival	

=== OVW ===
OVW Heavyweight Championship
Incoming champion – Dustin Jackson
Date	Winner	Event/Show	Note(s)
May 17	Jay DeNiro	Collision Course	
July 19	Dustin Jackson	Independence Rage	

OVW United States Heavyweight Championship
Incoming champion – Big Zo / Dr. Zo
Date	Winner	Event/Show	Note(s)
February 5	Tony Evans	OVW TV	This was Evans' Key of Opportunity match.
July 19	Kid Colossus	Independence Rage	

OVW Media Championship
Incoming champion – Jake Lawless
Date	Winner	Event/Show	Note(s)
February 15	Ashton Adonis	Tough Love	This was a three-way match also involving Star Rider.
March 15	Jay DeNiro	March Mayhem	Fellow Trifecta member Jake Lawless defended the title on behalf of Adonis, who was suspended for the night by OVW General Manager Katie Gannon.
May 21	Vacated	OVW TV	DeNiro relinquished the title after winning the OVW Heavyweight Championship.
June 11	Drew Hernandez	OVW TV 1400	Defeated Colby Carter in a tournament final to win the vacant title.
July 19	Stephan Steel	Independence Rage	

OVW Rush Division Championship
Incoming champion – Jota Peso
Date	Winner	Event/Show	Note(s)
January 11	Brendan Balling	Nightmare Rumble	This was a six-way scramble also involving Elijah Eros, JJ Lawson, Jake Painter, and Maximo Suave.
May 15	JJ Lawson	Collision Course	
July 19	Brendan Balling	Independence Rage	This was a tables, ladders, and chairs match.
July 19	JJ Lawson	OVW TV: Independence Rewind	

OVW Women's Championship
Incoming champion – Leela Feist
Date	Winner	Event/Show	Note(s)
March 15	Shalonce Royal	March Mayhem	This was a four-way match also involving Freya the Slaya and Lovely Miss Larkan.
May 17	Dayami	Collision Course	
May 21	Vacated	OVW TV	Dayami was forced to relinquish the title due to her work visa expiring.
June 11	Lovely Miss Larkan	OVW TV 1400	Defeated Shalonce Royal in a tournament final to win the vacant title.
July 19	J-Rod	Independence Rage	

OVW Tag Team Championship
Incoming champions – Donovan Cecil and Jack Vaughn
Date	Winner	Event/Show	Note(s)
February 15	Los Desafios (Jota Peso and Maximo Suave)	Tough Love	
March 15	The Troublemakers (Glenn Spectre and Canaan Kristopher)	March Mayhem	This was a ladder match.
April 12	Z Force (Super Z and Kid Colossus)	Double Crossed	
June 11	Only Bros (Boy Toy Troy and Coach Prime)	OVW TV 1400	This was a four-way tag team match also involving The Trifecta (Jake Lawless and Jake Painter) and The Sin City Outlaws (Luke Hartman and Mad Dog Martin).

=== Oz Academy ===
Oz Academy Openweight Championship
Incoming champion – Saori Anou
Date	Winner	Event/Show	Note(s)
February 8	Hiroyo Matsumoto	Oz 30th & Ozaki 40th: Blooming with Pride	

Oz Academy Pioneer 3-Way Championship
Incoming champion – Vacant
Date	Winner	Event/Show	Note(s)
April 26	Ryo Mizunami	Big Battle Bonus	Defeated Rina Yamashita and Rin in a tournament final to win the vacant title.
August 16	Kakeru	Oz 30th & Ozaki 40th: Plum no Hanasaku OZ no Kuni	This was a three-way match also involving Akino.

Oz Academy Tag Team Championship
Incoming champion – Gojizones United (Hiroyo Matsumoto and Zones)
Date	Winner	Event/Show	Note(s)
August 16	Jet Black Oimokabuki (Saori Anou and Unagi Sayaka)	Oz 30th & Ozaki 40th: Plum no Hanasaku OZ no Kuni	

=== Prestige ===
Prestige Championship
Incoming champion – Kevin Blackwood
Date	Winner	Event/Show	Note(s)
February 20	Judas Icarus	Roseland XIII: The End	This was also the final match of Kevin Blackwood.
February 20	Deactivated	Roseland XIII: The End	The title was retired immediately as this was Prestige Wrestling's last ever event.

Prestige Tag Team Championship
Incoming champions – Midnight Heat (Ricky Gibson and Eddie Pearl)
Date	Winner	Event/Show	Note(s)
February 20	The Hammer Brothers (Jack Hammer and Sledge Hammer)	Roseland XIII: The End	
February 20	Deactivated	Roseland XIII: The End	The title was retired immediately as this was Prestige Wrestling's last ever event.

=== Progress ===
Progress World Championship
Incoming champion – Man Like DeReiss
Date	Winner	Event/Show	Note(s)
May 3	Cara Noir	Chapter 194: Super Strong Style 16 Tournament Edition 2026; Night 1	
September 6	Malakai Black	The Odyssey Tour; Night 3	
September 27	Cara Noir	Chapter 198: When September Ends	

Progress World Women's Championship
Incoming champion – Rayne Leverkusen
Date	Winner	Event/Show	Note(s)
January 25	Alexxis Falcon	Chapter 189: In Darkest Night	
July 26	Rhio	Chapter 196: Scorchio	

Progress Atlas Championship
Incoming champion – Will Kroos
Date	Winner	Event/Show	Note(s)
January 1	Saxon Huxley	Noah The New Year	This was the first time a Progress championship changed hands at a Pro Wrestling Noah show.
February 15	Gene Munny	Chapter 190: In Brightest Day	

Progress Proteus Championship
Incoming champion – Paul Walter Hauser
Date	Winner	Event/Show	Note(s)
October 25	Dijak	Chapter 199: Bonestorm	This was Hauser's Open challenge.

Progress Tag Team Championship
Incoming champions – Diamond Eyes (Connor Mills and Nico Angelo)
Date	Winner	Event/Show	Note(s)
March 29	Young Guns (Ethan Allen and Luke Jacobs)	Chapter 192: Cause & Effect	Jay Joshua defended the titles on Connor Mills' behalf.
June 7	The 0121 (Drilla Moloney and Man Like DeReiss)	Chapter 195: Wonderbrawl II	

=== Pure-J ===
Pure-J Openweight Championship
Incoming champion – Saki
Date	Winner	Event/Show	Note(s)
January 4	Hanako Nakamori	First Battle	

Princess of Pro-Wrestling Championship
Incoming champion – Honoka
Date	Winner	Event/Show	Note(s)
August 15	Miria Koga	WAVE Yumi Ohka 25th Anniversary	This was a Pro Wrestling Wave event.

KSR Championship
Incoming champion – Flying Penguin
Date	Winner	Event/Show	Note(s)

Daily Sports Women's Tag Team Championship
Incoming champion – Kobayashi Group (Kaho Kobayashi and Hanako Nakamori)
Date	Winner	Event/Show	Note(s)
June 21	The Star of Middle Age (Kaori Yoneyama and Kazuki)	Rainbow Unicorn Vol. 7	
August 11	Princess Blaze (Chie Ozora and Misa Kagura)	Rainbow Mountain ~ Pure-J 9th Anniversary	

=== RevPro ===
Undisputed British Heavyweight Championship
Incoming champions – Jay Joshua
Date	Winner	Event/Show	Note(s)
June 7	Michael Oku	Live in London 108	
August 29	Connor Mills	14th Anniversary Show	

Undisputed British Women's Championship
Incoming champion – Alex Windsor
Date	Winner	Event/Show	Note(s)
March 21	Alexxis Falcon	High Stakes	
August 29	Kanji	14th Anniversary Show	

Undisputed British Cruiserweight Championship
Incoming champion – Joe Lando
Date	Winner	Event/Show	Note(s)
May 17	Leyton Buzzard	Revolution Rumble	
October 17	Vacated	Fantastica Mania UK; Show 1	Buzzard vacated the title due to suffering an ACL injury.
October 17	Cameron Khai	Fantastica Mania UK; Show 2	Defeated Titán in a tournament final to win the vacant title.

Undisputed British Tag Team Championship
Incoming champions – Young Guns (Ethan Allen and Luke Jacobs)
Date	Winner	Event/Show	Note(s)
May 17	Slater Dojo (Leon Slater and Liam Slater)	Revolution Rumble	
July 12	Cowboy Way (Thomas Shire and 1 Called Manders)	Live in Sheffield 26	
August 29	FTR (Dax Harwood and Cash Wheeler)	14th Anniversary Show	

=== Revolver ===
Revolver World Championship
Incoming champions – Myron Reed
Date	Winner	Event/Show	Note(s)
February 5	Krule	Kross Hour	This was a three-way match also involving Alan Angels, who cashed in his Golden Ticket to enter the match.
April 25	Mance Warner	Revolver Strong	
August 15	Damian Chambers	Cage of Horrors 5	This was Chambers' Golden Ticket cash-in match, which was originally a three-way match between previous champion Mance Warner, Alex Colon, and Krule in a Cage of Horrors match but converted into a four-way match after Chambers cashed-in his Golden Ticket mid-match, with Chambers pinning Colon to win the title.

Revolver Remix Championship
Incoming champion – Chris Danger
Date	Winner	Event/Show	Note(s)
February 5	BDE	Kross Hour	This was a Danger, Ladders, and Chairs match.
June 12	Brent Oakley	No County for Ole Mancer	This was a Dayton Street Fight.
October 2	Zachary Wentz	Tales from the Ring 9	

Revolver Texas Championship
Incoming champion – KJ Orso
Date	Winner	Event/Show	Note(s)

Revolver 24/7 Scramble Championship
Incoming champion – Bigg Pound
Date	Winner	Event/Show	Note(s)
February 5	Trey Miguel	Kross Hour	Also involved Juni Underwood, Gringo Loco, Jeffrey John, and Dante Leon.
April 25	Bigg Pound	–	Pound pinned Miguel in his home while the latter was recovering from a broken patella.
June 12	Crash	No County for Ole Mancer	This was a four-way match also involving Troy Parker and Dreadknot.
October 2	Gringo Loco	Tales from the Ring 9	This was a seven-way scramble also involving Troy Parker, Harley Rock, Kristian Robinson, Kiran Grey and Bigg Pound.

Revolver Tag Team Championship
Incoming champions – The Rascalz (Dezmond Xavier and Zachary Wentz)
Date	Winner	Event/Show	Note(s)
April 25	Vacated	Revolver Strong	The Rascalz relinquished the titles due to scheduling conflicts.
April 25	Tye or Die (KJ Reynolds, Ryan Matthias, and Amazanga)	Revolver Strong	Reynolds and Matthias defeated The Outbreak (Jacksyn Crowley and Abel Booker) to win the vacant titles.
August 15	Oi4K (Jake Crist, Rich Swann, and Trey Miguel)	Cage of Horrors 5	This was contested as a six-man tag team match.

=== ROH ===
ROH World Championship
Incoming champion – Bandido
Date	Winner	Event/Show	Note(s)

ROH Women's World Championship
Incoming champion – Athena
Date	Winner	Event/Show	Note(s)

ROH World Television Championship
Incoming champion – Nick Wayne
Date	Winner	Event/Show	Note(s)
May 9 (aired May 14)	AR Fox	ROH Honor Club TV: Supercard Showdown	
June 11 (aired June 18)	Lio Rush	Global Wars Cincinnati; Week 1	This was a three-way match also involving Action Andretti.
August 21	Action Andretti	Death Before Dishonor	This was a Fight Without Honor.

ROH Women's World Television Championship
Incoming champion – Red Velvet
Date	Winner	Event/Show	Note(s)

ROH Pure Championship
Incoming champion – Lee Moriarty
Date	Winner	Event/Show	Note(s)

ROH Women's Pure Championship
Incoming champion – Deonna Purrazzo
Date	Winner	Event/Show	Note(s)

ROH World Tag Team Championship
Incoming champions – La Facción Ingobernable (Sammy Guevara and The Beast Mortos)
Date	Winner	Event/Show	Note(s)
June 26	El Sky Team (Máscara Dorada and Místico)	CMLL Super Viernes	This was a CMLL show.

ROH World Six-Man Tag Team Championship
Incoming champions – Shane Taylor Promotions (Shane Taylor, Carlie Bravo, and Capt. Shawn Dean)
Date	Winner	Event/Show	Note(s)
May 15	Dalton Castle and The Outrunners (Turbo Floyd and Truth Magnum)	Supercard of Honor	This was an open challenge.
August 21	The Lethal Twist (Jay Lethal, Blake Christian, and Lee Johnson)	Death Before Dishonor	

=== Seadlinnng ===
Beyond the Sea Single Championship
Incoming champion – Hiroyo Matsumoto
Date	Winner	Event/Show	Note(s)
April 17	Ayame Sasamura	Jump Up!	This was the final of the 2026 Seadlinnng Saikyo Tournament.

Beyond the Sea Tag Team Championship
Incoming champion – Colorful Bouquet Toss (Unagi Sayaka and Honori Hana)
Date	Winner	Event/Show	Note(s)

=== Senjo ===
Sendai Girls World Championship
Incoming champion – Chihiro Hashimoto
Date	Winner	Event/Show	Note(s)

Sendai Girls Junior Championship
Incoming champion – Yuna
Date	Winner	Event/Show	Note(s)
January 23	Senka Akatsuki	Sendai Girls	
July 12	Spike Nishimura	Senjo 20th Anniversary Tour in Sendai Pit ~ SENJO The Biggest ~	

Sendai Girls Tag Team Championship
Incoming champion – Bob Bob Momo Banana (Mio Momono and Yurika Oka)
Date	Winner	Event/Show	Note(s)
April 12	Manami and Ryo Mizunami	Sendai Girls	
June 13	Red Energy (Mika Iwata and Miyuki Takase)	Sendai Girls 20th Anniversary	

=== Spark Joshi ===
Spark Joshi World Championship
Incoming champion – Hazuki
Date	Winner	Event/Show	Note(s)

Spark Joshi Pacific Championship
Incoming champion – Airica Demia
Date	Winner	Event/Show	Note(s)

Spark Joshi Atlantic Championship
Incoming champion – Saki
Date	Winner	Event/Show	Note(s)

=== Stardom ===
World of Stardom Championship
Incoming champion – Saya Kamitani
Date	Winner	Event/Show	Note(s)
April 26	Sayaka Kurara	All Star Grand Queendom	
June 20	Suzu Suzuki	The Conversion	

Wonder of Stardom Championship
Incoming champion – Konami
Date	Winner	Event/Show	Note(s)
April 26	Hanan	All Star Grand Queendom	

Goddesses of Stardom Championship
Incoming champions – BMI2000 (Natsuko Tora and Ruaka)
Date	Winner	Event/Show	Note(s)
April 26	02line (AZM and Miyu Amasaki)	All Star Grand Queendom	

Artist of Stardom Championship
Incoming champions – H.A.T.E. (Konami, Rina, and Fukigen Death)
Date	Winner	Event/Show	Note(s)
May 26	Dream Trine (Hina, Ami Sohrei, and Lady C)	Stardom Nighter in Korakuen	
July 18	Triangle of Madness (Thekla, Julia Hart, and Skye Blue)	5 Star Grand Prix; Night 1	

High Speed Championship
Incoming champion – Yuna Mizumori
Date	Winner	Event/Show	Note(s)

Future of Stardom Championship
Incoming champion – Hanako
Date	Winner	Event/Show	Note(s)
March 15	Ranna Yagami	Cinderella Tournament Final	

New Blood Tag Team Championship
Incoming champions – Sakurara (Aya Sakura and Sayaka Kurara)
Date	Winner	Event/Show	Note(s)
October 20	Meni☆Mani (Rian and Kikyo Furusawa)	Stardom Nighter in Korakuen	

IWGP Women's Championship
Incoming champion – Syuri
Co-promoted with New Japan Pro-Wrestling
Date	Winner	Event/Show	Note(s)

Strong Women's Championship
Incoming champion – Saya Kamitani
Co-promoted with New Japan Pro-Wrestling
Date	Winner	Event/Show	Note(s)
January 4	Syuri	NJPW Wrestle Kingdom 20	This was a Winner Takes All match also for Syuri's IWGP Women's Championship.
March 8	Alex Windsor	EVE 146: Wrestle Queendom VIII	This was a Pro-Wrestling: EVE show.

=== Tenryu Project ===
Tenryu Project International Junior Heavyweight Championship
Incoming champion – Koji Iwamoto
Date	Winner	Event/Show	Note(s)
February 25	Keita Yano	Live For Today Vol. 10	
September 19	Masaaki Mochizuki	Project Reborn For The Future Vol. 4	

Tenryu Project International Junior Heavyweight Tag Team Championship
Incoming champions – Takuro Niki and Yusuke Kodama
Date	Winner	Event/Show	Note(s)
August 26	Vacated	–	The titles were vacated due to a lack of defenses.
October 3	Ayumu Honda and Keita Yano	IJ Tag And Six-Man Tag Title New Decision Tournaments	Defeated Kenichiro Arai and Masaaki Mochizuki in the finals of a tournament to win the vacant titles.

Tenryu Project WAR World 6-Man Tag Team Championship
Incoming champions – Kengo, Masayuki Kono, and Yuya Susumu
Date	Winner	Event/Show	Note(s)
August 26	Vacated	–	The titles were vacated due to a lack of defenses.
October 3	Kohei Sato, Satsuki Nagao and Takuro Niki	IJ Tag And Six-Man Tag Title New Decision Tournaments	Defeated Daichi Hashimoto, Mizuki Watase and Tatsuhito Takaiwa in the finals of a tournament to win the vacant titles.

Tenryu Project United National Heavyweight Tag Team Championship
Incoming champions – Koji Iwamoto and Hideyoshi Kamitani
Date	Winner	Event/Show	Note(s)

=== TNA ===
TNA World Championship
Incoming champion – Frankie Kazarian
Date	Winner	Event/Show	Note(s)
January 15	Mike Santana	Thursday Night Impact! premiere on AMC	
June 28	Nic Nemeth	Slammiversary	This was Nemeth's Call Your Shot title opportunity.
October 11	Leon Slater	Bound for Glory	This was Slater's Option C title opportunity.

TNA Knockouts World Championship
Incoming champion – Léi Yǐng Lee
Date	Winner	Event/Show	Note(s)
February 13	Arianna Grace	No Surrender	
April 15 (aired May 7)	Léi Yǐng Lee	Thursday Night Impact!	
June 28	Xia Brookside	Slammiverary	
October 11	Indi Hartwell	Bound for Glory	

TNA X Division Championship
Incoming champion – Leon Slater
Date	Winner	Event/Show	Note(s)
May 14	Cedric Alexander	Thursday Night Impact!	This was a 2-out-of-3 falls match with Alexander winning 2–1.
August 23	Leon Slater	Lockdown	This was a Last Man Standing Steel Cage match, where had Slater lost, his first reign would have been unrecognized.
August 23	Vacated	Lockdown	Previous champion Slater invoked Option C for a TNA World Championship match at Bound for Glory.
October 11	Amazing Red	Bound for Glory	Defeated BDE, Cedric Alexander, Fabian Aichner, KC Navarro, Rich Swann, and Ryan Nemeth in a seven-way scramble to win the vacant title.

TNA International Championship
Incoming champion – Channing "Stacks" Lorenzo
Date	Winner	Event/Show	Note(s)
February 13	Trey Miguel	No Surrender	This was Miguel's Feast or Fired cash-in match.
April 11	Mustafa Ali	Rebellion	
June 30	Jason Hotch	Thursday Night Impact!	
August 23	Mustafa Ali	Lockdown	This was a Steel Cage match.
October 11	Jason Hotch	Bound for Glory	This The Order 4-way match also involved John Skyler and Special Agent 0.
November 19	A. J. Francis	Thursday Night Impact!	

TNA Knockouts Television Championship
(Title created)
Date	Winner	Event/Show	Note(s)
August 27	M by Elegance	Thursday Night Impact!	Defeated Jada Stone in the tournament final to become the inaugural champion.
November 19	Elayna Black	Thursday Night Impact!	

TNA World Tag Team Championship
Incoming champions – The Hardys (Matt Hardy and Jeff Hardy)
Date	Winner	Event/Show	Note(s)
April 11	The System (Brian Myers and Bear Bronson)	Rebellion	
June 28	The Broken Hardys (Broken Matt and Brother Nero)	Slammiversary	This was a four-way ladder match also featuring The Righteous (Vincent and Dutch) and The Great Hands (Jason Hotch and John Skyler).
August 23	The Nemeths (Nic Nemeth and Ryan Nemeth)	Lockdown	This was a Steel Cage tornado tag team match.

TNA Knockouts World Tag Team Championship
Incoming champions – The IInspiration (Cassie Lee and Jessie McKay)
Date	Winner	Event/Show	Note(s)
January 15	The Elegance Brand (Heather by Elegance and M by Elegance)	Thursday Night Impact! premiere on AMC	
June 28	DemonXBunny (Allie and Rosemary/Kiera Hogan)	Slammiversary	On August 23 at Lockdown, Hogan replaced Rosemary after Rosemary suffered an injury; they successfully retained the titles against The Elegance Brand (Heather by Elegance and M by Elegance) in a Steel Cage tag team match; thus, Hogan was recognized as champion.

=== UWN ===
UWN World Championship
Incoming champion – Jordan Cruz
Date	Winner	Event/Show	Note(s)

UWN Women's World Championship
Incoming champion – Big Mama
Date	Winner	Event/Show	Note(s)

UWN Heritage Heavyweight Championship
Incoming champion – Maximilien
Date	Winner	Event/Show	Note(s)

UWN Television Championship
Incoming champion – Evan Daniels
Date	Winner	Event/Show	Note(s)

UWN Tag Team Championship
Incoming champion – 5150 (Danny Limelight and Slice Boogie)
Date	Winner	Event/Show	Note(s)

=== Wave Pro ===
Wave Single Championship
Incoming champion – Itsuki Aoki
Date	Winner	Event/Show	Note(s)
August 15	Haruka Umesaki	Yumi Ohka 25th Anniversary	

Wave Tag Team Championship
Incoming champion – Life Thirty-One (Yumi Ohka and Saran)
Date	Winner	Event/Show	Note(s)
February 8	Unstoppable (Hiragi Kurumi and Mochi Natsumi)	Valentine Wave	
March 1	Amekyun (Haruka Umesaki and Honoka)	Nami 1	
March 20	Kids Club (Kohaku and Momoka Hanazono)	It's Wave February	
March 21	Are You Ready! (Rina Amikura and Yuko Sakurai)	Itabashi Surprise March	
August 15	Osso and Sakura (Kaho Kobayashi and Zones)	Yumi Ohka 25th Anniversary	
September 24	Team Natsuba (Natsu Sumire and Yuuri)	Shinjuku Face Countdown Series	
November 15	Kids Club (Kohaku and Momoka Hanazono)	Sapporo Wave ~ NA MA RA Kingdom	

=== West Coast Pro ===
West Coast Pro Heavyweight Championship
Incoming champion – Vinnie Massaro
Date	Winner	Event/Show	Note(s)
Juen 20 (aired June 25)	Adam Priest	Cruel Summer	

West Coast Pro Women's Championship
Incoming champion – Johnnie Robbie
Date	Winner	Event/Show	Note(s)
April 16 (aired April 23)	Mio Momono	West Coast vs. The World	

West Coast Pro Golden Gate Championship
Incoming champion – Andrew Cass
Date	Winner	Event/Show	Note(s)
January 4	Alan Angels	Operation Stockola	
February 27	Andrew Cass	Evil Empire	This was a three-way match also involving G. Sharpe.
July 25 (aired July 30)	JT Thorne	PrideStyle/West Coast Pro Rooted	Co-promoted with PrideStyle Pro Wrestling. This was a four-way match also involving Jayson Xavier and Jiah Jewell.

West Coast Pro Tag Team Championship
Incoming champions – The Crush Boys (Titus Alexander and Starboy Charlie)
Date	Winner	Event/Show	Note(s)
March 22	Aaron Solo and Alan Angels	PWR/West Coast Pro Lucha Libre Wrestling Night	Co-promoted with Pro Wrestling Revolution (PWR).

=== WOS ===
WOS Championship
Incoming champion – Sha Samuels
Date	Winner	Event/Show	Note(s)

WOS Women's Championship
Incoming champion – Alex Windsor
Date	Winner	Event/Show	Note(s)

WOS Tag Team Championship
Incoming champions – UK Pitbulls (Bulk and Big Dave)
Date	Winner	Event/Show	Note(s)

=== WOW ===
WOW World Championship
Incoming champion – Santana Garrett
Date	Winner	Event/Show	Note(s)

WOW World Tag Team Championship
Incoming champions – Best 4 Business (Kara Kai and Sandy Shore)
Date	Winner	Event/Show	Note(s)

WOW Trios Championship
Incoming champions – Monsters and Metal (Chainsaw, Daisy Lane, and Fury)
Date	Winner	Event/Show	Note(s)

=== WWE ===
– Raw
– SmackDown
– NXT
– Evolve
– Unbranded

==== Raw and SmackDown ====
Raw and SmackDown each exclusively have a world and secondary championship for both the men and women, as well as a tag team championship for men.

World Heavyweight Championship
Incoming champion – CM Punk
Date	Winner	Event/Show	Note(s)
April 19	Roman Reigns	WrestleMania 42; Night 2	

Undisputed WWE Championship
Incoming champion – Cody Rhodes
Date	Winner	Event/Show	Note(s)
January 9	Drew McIntyre	SmackDown	This was a Three Stages of Hell match. The three stages were: a standard singles match, a Falls Count Anywhere match, and a Steel Cage match; McIntyre won the first and third.
March 6	Cody Rhodes	SmackDown	
June 27	Sami Zayn	Night of Champions	This was a triple threat match that also involved Gunther.
July 6	CM Punk	Raw	
September 11	Sami Zayn	SmackDown	

Women's World Championship
Incoming champion – Stephanie Vaquer
Date	Winner	Event/Show	Note(s)
April 18	Liv Morgan	WrestleMania 42; Night 1	
September 12	Stephanie Vaquer	WWE South America Live Tour; Night 4	Becky Lynch served as the special guest referee.
October 10	Liv Morgan	Money in the Bank	This was a triple threat match that also involved Becky Lynch.

WWE Women's Championship
Incoming champion – Jade Cargill
Date	Winner	Event/Show	Note(s)
April 19	Rhea Ripley	WrestleMania 42; Night 2	
August 2	Chelsea Green	SummerSlam; Night 2	This was a five-way ladder match, also involving Jade Cargill, Charlotte Flair, Lash Legend, and Tiffany Stratton. At the time, Green was recognized as interim champion due to an injury incurred by lineal champion Rhea Ripley, but on September 11, although not directly announced by WWE, the official title history was amended, with Ripley's reign ending when Green's began on August 2.
November 7	Tiffany Stratton	Crown Jewel	This was Stratton's Money in the Bank cash-in match.

WWE Intercontinental Championship
Incoming champion – Dominik Mysterio
Date	Winner	Event/Show	Note(s)
March 2	Penta	Raw	
August 2	Chad Gable	Summerslam; Night 2	
November 2	Ethan Page	Raw	

WWE United States Championship
Incoming champion – Carmelo Hayes
Date	Winner	Event/Show	Note(s)
March 27	Sami Zayn	SmackDown	This was an open challenge.
April 19	Trick Williams	WrestleMania 42; Night 2	
August 2	Baron Corbin	SummerSlam; Night 2	
September 6	Trick Williams	Sunday Night's Main Event	

WWE Women's Intercontinental Championship
Incoming champion – Maxxine Dupri
Date	Winner	Event/Show	Note(s)
January 5	Becky Lynch	Raw on Netflix Anniversary Show	
February 28	AJ Lee	Elimination Chamber	
April 18	Becky Lynch	WrestleMania 42; Night 1	
May 31	Sol Ruca	Clash in Italy	
July 27	Raquel Rodriguez	Raw	
November 16	Iyo Sky	Raw	

WWE Women's United States Championship
Incoming champion – Chelsea Green
Date	Winner	Event/Show	Note(s)
January 2	Giulia	SmackDown	
April 24	Tiffany Stratton	SmackDown	
August 14	Jacy Jayne	SmackDown	

World Tag Team Championship
Incoming champions – The Usos (Jey Uso and Jimmy Uso)
Date	Winner	Event/Show	Note(s)
March 30	The Vision (Bron Breakker, Austin Theory, and Logan Paul)	Raw	This was a Street Fight. Paul and Theory won the match, but Breakker was later recognized as champion under the Freebird Rule after Paul sustained a tricep injury.
June 22	The Street Profits (Angelo Dawkins and Montez Ford)	Raw	
July 6	The Vision (Bron Breakker and Austin Theory)	Raw	
November 6	Penta and Je'Von Evans	Crown Jewel	

WWE Tag Team Championship
Incoming champions – The Wyatt Sicks (Joe Gacy and Dexter Lumis)
Date	Winner	Event/Show	Note(s)
January 23	The MFTs (Solo Sikoa and Tama Tonga)	SmackDown	
March 20	Damian Priest and R-Truth	SmackDown	JC Mateo defended the title on behalf of Solo Sikoa.
August 14	The MFTs (Tama Tonga and Talla Tonga)	SmackDown	This triple threat tag team match also featured The War Raiders (Erik and Ivar).

==== NXT ====
NXT exclusively has a primary, secondary, and specialty championship for both the men and women, as well as a tag team championship for men.

NXT Championship
Incoming champion – Oba Femi
Date	Winner	Event/Show	Note(s)
January 6	Vacated	NXT: New Year's Evil	After successfully defending the title against Leon Slater, Oba Femi left the championship belt in the ring, voluntarily relinquishing the title as he moved up to the main roster.
February 3	Joe Hendry	NXT	Defeated Ricky Saints, Jackson Drake, Keanu Carver, Dion Lennox, Sean Legacy, and Shiloh Hill in a seven-man ladder match to win the vacant championship.
April 4	Tony D'Angelo	Stand & Deliver	This was a fatal four-way match also involving Ethan Page and Ricky Saints.
August 30	Grayson Waller	Heatwave	This was a fatal four-way match also involving Cruz Montana and Zilla Fatu.

NXT Women's Championship
Incoming champion – Jacy Jayne
Date	Winner	Event/Show	Note(s)
April 4	Lola Vice	Stand & Deliver	This was a triple threat match also involving Kendal Grey.
June 28	Kendal Grey	The Great American Bash	
August 30	Kelani Jordan	Heatwave	

NXT North American Championship
Incoming champion – Ethan Page
Date	Winner	Event/Show	Note(s)
February 24	Myles Borne	NXT	
August 30	Jackson Drake	Heatwave	

NXT Women's North American Championship
Incoming champion – Thea Hail
Date	Winner	Event/Show	Note(s)
January 6	Izzi Dame	NXT: New Year's Evil	This was an open challenge.
March 7	Tatum Paxley	Vengeance Day	
June 9	Zaria	NXT	

WWE Speed Championship
Incoming champion – Jasper Troy
Date	Winner	Event/Show	Note(s)
February 24	Elio LeFleur	NXT	This was a triple threat match with an extended seven-minute time limit that also involved Eli Knight.
March 31	Vacated	NXT	Elio LeFleur relinquished the title due to a shoulder injury.
April 21	Lexis King	NXT: Revenge; Week 2	Defeated EK Prosper in a tournament final for the vacant title.
September 1	Deactivated	NXT	After Zaria retired the WWE Women's Speed Championship at Heatwave two days prior, NXT General Manager Robert Stone had Lexis King relinquish the men's title and retired it.

WWE Women's Speed Championship
Incoming champion – Fallon Henley
Date	Winner	Event/Show	Note(s)
March 17	Wren Sinclair	NXT	
August 30	Unified	Heatwave	Zaria defeated Kali Armstrong and WWE Women's Speed Champion Wren Sinclair to unify the WWE Women's Speed Championship into Zaria's NXT Women's North American Championship. Sinclair is recognized as the final champion with Zaria going forward as the NXT Women's North American Champion.

NXT Tag Team Championship
Incoming champions – DarkState (Osiris Griffin and Saquon Shugars)
Date	Winner	Event/Show	Note(s)
February 24	The Vanity Project (Brad Baylor and Ricky Smokes)	NXT	
August 4	Myles Borne and Tavion Heights	NXT	
August 30	The Vanity Project (Brad Baylor and Ricky Smokes)	Heatwave	

==== Unbranded ====
The following title is non-exclusive, available to wrestlers from Raw, SmackDown, and NXT.

WWE Women's Tag Team Championship
Incoming champions – The Kabuki Warriors (Asuka and Kairi Sane)
Date	Winner	Event/Show	Note(s)
January 5	Rhiyo (Rhea Ripley and Iyo Sky)	Raw on Netflix Anniversary Show	
February 27	The Irresistible Forces (Nia Jax and Lash Legend)	SmackDown	
April 18	Brie Bella and Paige	WrestleMania 42; Night 1	This was a fatal four-way tag team match that also involved the team of Bayley and Lyra Valkyria and the team of Charlotte Flair and Alexa Bliss, with Paige pinning Bliss. Brie was originally scheduled to team with her sister Nikki Bella as The Bella Twins but a returning Paige replaced Nikki due to injury.
July 18	Fatal Influence (Fallon Henley and Lainey Reid)	Saturday Night's Main Event XLV	
October 9	Alexa Bliss and Tatum Paxley	SmackDown	
October 23	Michin and B-Fab	SmackDown	

==== WWE Evolve ====
Evolve is a developmental brand focused on trainees from the WWE Performance Center, and has two championships, one each for the men and women.

WWE Evolve Men's Championship
Incoming champion – Jackson Drake
Date	Winner	Event/Show	Note(s)
February 20 (aired March 18)	Aaron Rourke	Evolve	
June 19 (aired July 15)	Harlem Lewis	Evolve	

WWE Evolve Women's Championship
Incoming champion – Kendal Grey
Date	Winner	Event/Show	Note(s)
February 20 (aired March 11)	Vacated	Evolve	Kendal Grey relinquished the title as she became a full-time member of the NXT brand.
March 20 (aired April 15)	Wendy Choo	Evolve	This was an eight-woman Gauntlet Eliminator in which Choo last pinned Nikkita Lyons to win the vacant title.
May 29 (aired June 24)	Nikkita Lyons	Evolve: Succession III	

==== WWE ID ====
The WWE Independent Development (ID) program has two championships, one each for men and women, which are defended exclusively across partner independent promotions. Additionally, if a non-WWE ID wrestler wins either title, they also earn a WWE ID contract.

WWE ID Championship
Incoming champion – Cappuccino Jones
Date	Winner	Event/Show	Note(s)
March 23	Starboy Charlie	Wrestling Open RI 44: "One of These Nights"	This was a Beyond Wrestling event. As a result of the win, Charlie also earned a WWE ID contract. On the April 1 episode of Evolve, Charlie's ring name was changed to Chazz "Starboy" Hall.
June 26	Max Abrams	The ID Showcase	This was a Nightmare Factory event.

WWE Women's ID Championship
Incoming champion – Laynie Luck
Date	Winner	Event/Show	Note(s)
October 3	Monica Monroe	Rise to Wrestling Royalty	This was a Reality of Wrestling event and was also a Winner Takes All match also for Monroe's ROW Women's Championship. As a result of the win, Monroe also earned a WWE ID contract.

=== WWNLive ===
– Unbranded
– Full Impact Pro
– Shine Wrestling

==== Unbranded ====
WWN Proving Ground Heavyweight Championship
Incoming champion – Brian Atomic
Date	Winner	Event/Show	Note(s)
April 13	Baby Keef	Proving Ground: Violence is The Answer	This was a Street Fight.

WWN Multimedia Championship
Incoming champion – Jay Sky
Date	Winner	Event/Show	Note(s)

WWN Proving Ground Women's Championship
Incoming champion – Emily Locke
Date	Winner	Event/Show	Note(s)
July 6	Tina San Antonio	Proving Ground: Elevate the Hate	

WWN Proving Ground Tag Team Championship
Incoming champion – Exodus (Body Bundy and Jacked Josh)
Date	Winner	Event/Show	Note(s)
June 6	The Miami Boyz (Chris Malachite and Puma Johnson)	Proving Ground: All or Nothing	

==== FIP ====
FIP World Heavyweight Championship
Incoming champion – August Artois
Date	Winner	Event/Show	Note(s)

FIP Florida Heritage Championship
Incoming champion – Sage Scott
Date	Winner	Event/Show	Note(s)
June 7	Vacated	Establish Dominance	Scott was defending the title against Daniel Lacey in a 2-out-of-3 falls match that ended in a no contest. As a result, the title was declared vacant.
August 9	Daniel Lacey	Heatstroke	Defeated Sage Scott in a Three Levels of Hell match to win the vacant title.

FIP World Tag Team Championship
Incoming champion – Annihiliation (Chungus and Syther)
Date	Winner	Event/Show	Note(s)
January 3	Exodus (Body Bundy and Jacked Josh)	Everything Burns	

==== Shine ====
Shine Championship
Incoming champion – Kelsey Raegan
Date	Winner	Event/Show	Note(s)
July 5	Mercedes Martinez	Shine 87: 14th Anniversary Spectacular	

Shine Nova Championship
Incoming champion – Sara Leon
Date	Winner	Event/Show	Note(s)

Shine Tag Team Championship
Incoming champion – The Final Act (Bella Snow and Sofia Castillo)
Date	Winner	Event/Show	Note(s)
April 12	The Vicious Vixens (Kaci Lennox and Sahara Se7en)	Shine 86	

=== wXw ===
wXw Unified World Wrestling Championship
Incoming champions – Peter Tihanyi
Date	Winner	Event/Show	Note(s)
January 24	Elijah Blum	Back to the Roots	This was a pure wrestling rules match.
August 15	Ahura	Shortcut to The Top	

wXw Shotgun Championship
Incoming champions – Dennis Dullnig
Date	Winner	Event/Show	Note(s)
April 11	Axel Tischer	We Love Wrestling #76	
September 27	Vacated	Pro-Wrestling Grand Prix 2026; Finals	
September 27	Alex Duke	Pro-Wrestling Grand Prix 2026; Finals	Defeated Miles Deville, Robert Dreissker and Zoltan to win the vacant title.

wXw European Championship
Incoming champion – Ricky Sosa
Date	Winner	Event/Show	Note(s)
April 11	Zoltan	We Love Wrestling #76	
August 15	Dieter Schwartz	Shortcut to The Top; Pre-Show	
September 27	Laurance Roman	Pro-Wrestling Grand Prix 2026; Finals	

wXw World Tag Team Championship
Incoming champions – The Grind (Laurance Roman and Nick Schreier)
Date	Winner	Event/Show	Note(s)
March 7	Planet Gojirah (Robert Dreissker and Marc Empire)	16 Carat Gold Tournament; Night 2	This was a Street Fight.
August 15	CSI (Luca de Leone and Nordino)	Shortcut to The Top	This was a No Holds Barred match.

wXw Academy Championship
Incoming champion – The Breezy Bruiser
Date	Winner	Event/Show	Note(s)
March 4	Aleksander Bellamy	Heat in der wXw Wrestling Academy	

wXw Women's World Championship
Incoming champions – (title reactivated)
Date	Winner	Event/Show	Note(s)
September 27	Chihiro Hashimoto	Pro-Wrestling Grand Prix 2026; Finals	Defeated Kanji in the finals of the 2026 wXw Femmes Fatales tournament to win the reactivated championship.

=== Zero1 ===
World Heavyweight Championship
Incoming champion – Masato Tanaka
Date	Winner	Event/Show	Note(s)
April 3 (aired April 11)	Junya Matsunaga	Zero1 25th Anniversary	

World Junior Heavyweight Championship
Incoming champion – Takumi Baba
Date	Winner	Event/Show	Note(s)

International Junior Heavyweight Championship
Incoming champion – Takumi Baba
Date	Winner	Event/Show	Note(s)

Intercontinental Tag Team Championship
Incoming champions – Junya Matsunaga and Tsugutaka Sato
Date	Winner	Event/Show	Note(s)

International Lightweight Tag Team Championship
(Title reactivated)
Date	Winner	Event/Show	Note(s)
April 3 (aired April 11)	Yuki Toki and Van Vert Jack	Zero1 25th Anniversary	Defeated Takuya Sugawara and Bryan Ishizaka to win the revived titles. The titles had been inactive since December 25, 2020.
November 7	Naruki Doi and Takuya Sugawara	Zero1	

== Awards and honors ==
=== AAA ===
==== AAA Hall of Fame ====
Inductee	Inducted by
Marisela Peña	Rey Mysterio

=== Cauliflower Alley Club ===
Award	Recipient(s)
Iron Mike Mazurki Award	Ric Flair
Lou Thesz Award	Bret Hart
Art Abrams Lifetime Achievement Award	Bill Apter
Men's Wrestling Award	Bobby Bass
Tag Team Award	The Glamour Girls (Leilani Kai and Judy Martin)
Lucha Libre Award	Psicosis
International Award	Dan Spivey
Legends Legacy Award	Tony Atlas
Jim Ross Announcer Award	Gary Michael Cappetta
Charlie Smith Referee Award	Jimmy Korderas
James C. Melby Historian Award	Dan Murphy
Ron Hutchison Trainer Award	Rip Rogers
Rich Ingling Courage Award	Paul Lee and Peyton Lee
Mick Foley Philanthropy Award	Jimmy Hart

=== CZW ===
==== CZW Hall of Fame ====
Inductee
Danny Havoc

=== GCW ===
==== Indie Wrestling Hall of Fame ====
Inductee	Inducted by
Crowbar	TBD

==== Deathmatch Hall of Fame ====
Inductees
Megumi Kudo
Iceman
Masashi Takeda
Dysfunction

=== George Tragos/Lou Thesz Professional Wrestling Hall of Fame ===
Category	Inductee
Inductee	Nic Nemeth
Frank Gotch Award	Jeff Jarrett
James C. Melby Award	Tony Richards
Lou Thesz Award	The Welch-Fuller Family
George Tragos Award	Josh Barnett
Gordon Solie Award	Ken Resnick
Jack Brisco Spotlight/Red Belt Award	Jimmy Garvin
Verne Gagne Trainer Award	Jazz
Verne Gagne Trainer Award	Rodney Mack
Impact Award	James Beard

=== Hardcore Hall of Fame ===
Inductee	Inducted by
Ruckus	John Zandig

=== International Professional Wrestling Hall of Fame ===
Inductees
Bushwhacker Luke
George Napolitano
Gene LeBell
Marc Mero
Roddy Piper
Tommy Rich
Wendi Richter

=== NJPW ===
==== Best of the Super Juniors Awards ====
Award	Recipient(s)
Outstanding Performance Award	Jun Kasai
Fighting Spirit Award	Daiki Nagai
Technical Skill Award	Robbie X

==== G1 Climax Awards ====
Award	Recipient(s)
Outstanding Performance Award	Boltin Oleg
Fighting Spirit Award	Yuto-Ice
Technique Award	Ryohei Oiwa

=== Pro Wrestling Illustrated ===
==== Yearly Rankings ====
List	Ranked No. 1
PWI 500	MJF
PWI Women's 250	Stephanie Vaquer
PWI Tag Team 100	TBA

=== St. Louis Wrestling Hall of Fame ===
Inductees
André the Giant
Spike Huber
Johnny Rodz
Herb Simmons

=== TNA ===
==== TNA Hall of Fame ====
Inductees	Inducted by
ODB	Traci Brooks and Al Snow
Amazing Red	Frankie Kazarian
Konnan	Cruz Montana

=== Women's Wrestling Hall of Fame ===
Category	Inductee
Pro Wrestler	Gail Kim
Pro Wrestler	Melina Perez
Pro Wrestler	Debbie Malenko
Pro Wrestler	Mickie Knuckles
Pro Wrestler	Mimi Hagiwara
Pro Wrestler	Missy Sampson
Pro Wrestler	Linda Dallas
Pro Wrestler	Amy Lee
Pro Wrestler	Penelope Paradise
Non-Wrestler	Jasmin St. Claire
Non-Wrestler	Carmela Foss
Celebrity	Laurene Landon
Amateur	Natalia Vorobieva
Amateur	Pang Qianyu

==== WWHOF Awards ====
Award	Recipient
Pro Wrestler of the Year	Teal Piper
Most Improved Wrestler of the Year	Nahir Robles
Rookie of the Year	Zenith Zion
Best All-Around Athlete Award	Jessica Roden
Courage Award	Becca Wiley
Missy Sampson Award	Tommy Fierro
Susan Tex Green Award	Masha Slamovich
Susan Tex Green Spirit Award	Angel Metro

=== Wrestling Observer Newsletter ===
==== Wrestling Observer Newsletter Hall of Fame ====
Inductee
Ted Turner
Dominic DeNucci
Jesse "The Body" Ventura
George Gordienko

=== WWE ===
==== WWE Hall of Fame ====
Category	Inductee	Inducted by
Individual	Stephanie McMahon	Linda McMahon, Aurora Levesque, Murphy Levesque, and Vaughn Levesque
Individual	AJ Styles	Luke Gallows and Karl Anderson
Group	Demolition (Ax and Smash)	Arn Anderson, Haku, and The Warlord
Celebrity	Dennis Rodman	Kevin Nash and Sean Waltman
Legacy	Sid	N/A
Legacy	Bad News Brown	N/A
Immortal Moment	Hulk Hogan (c) vs. André the Giant for the WWF World Heavyweight Championship at WrestleMania III	Jimmy Hart

== Debuts ==
- January 4
  - Aaron Wolf
  - Shion Kanzaki (TJPW)
- February 2
  - Marie Malenko
- March 4
  - Taisei Nakahara (NJPW)
- April 21
  - Kylie Quinn (NXT)
- June 26
  - Avery Styles
- October 3
  - Chieri Sakimori (TJPW)
- November 8
  - Shiori Futaba (TJPW)

== Retirements ==
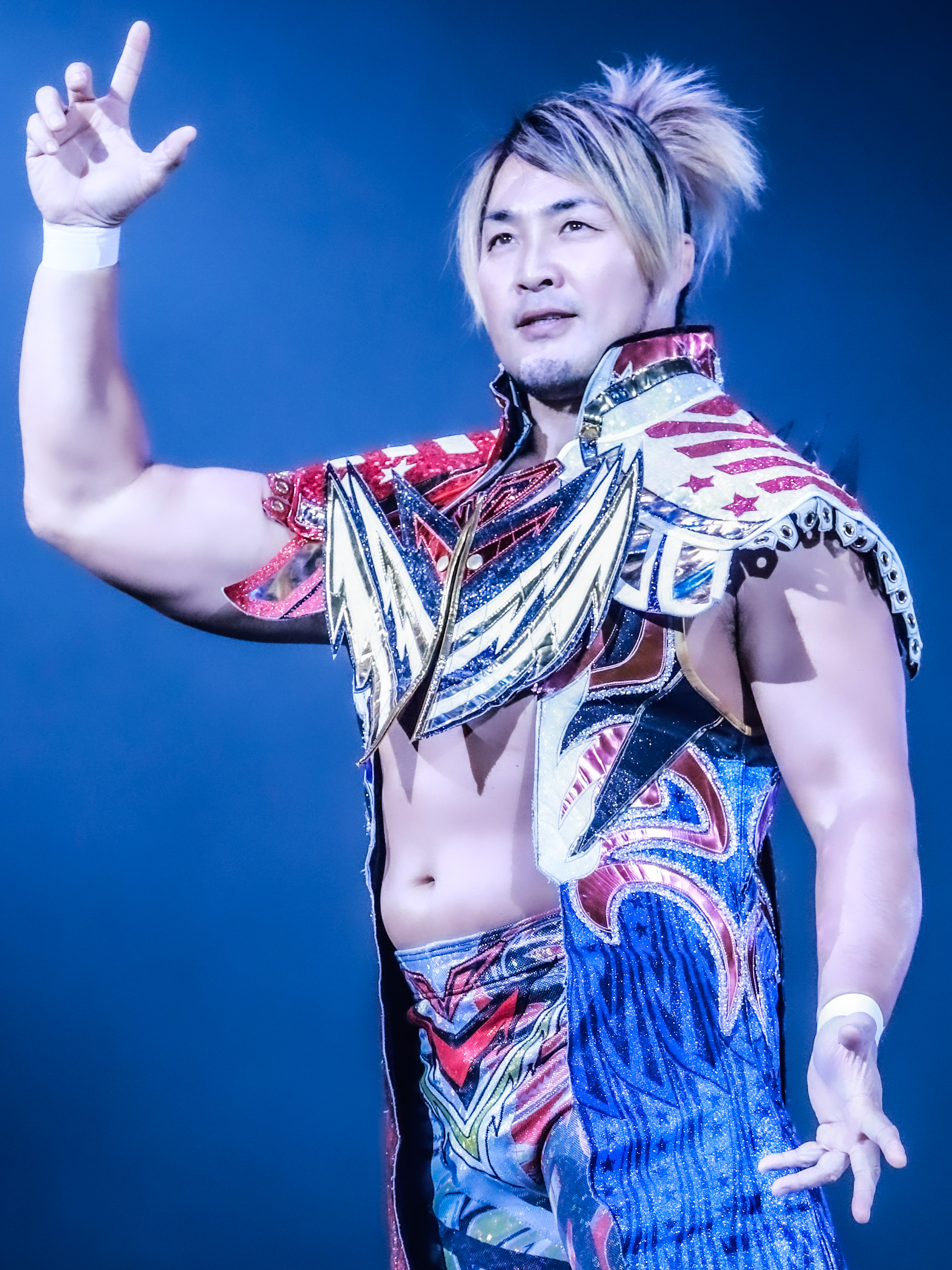
Hiroshi Tanahashi

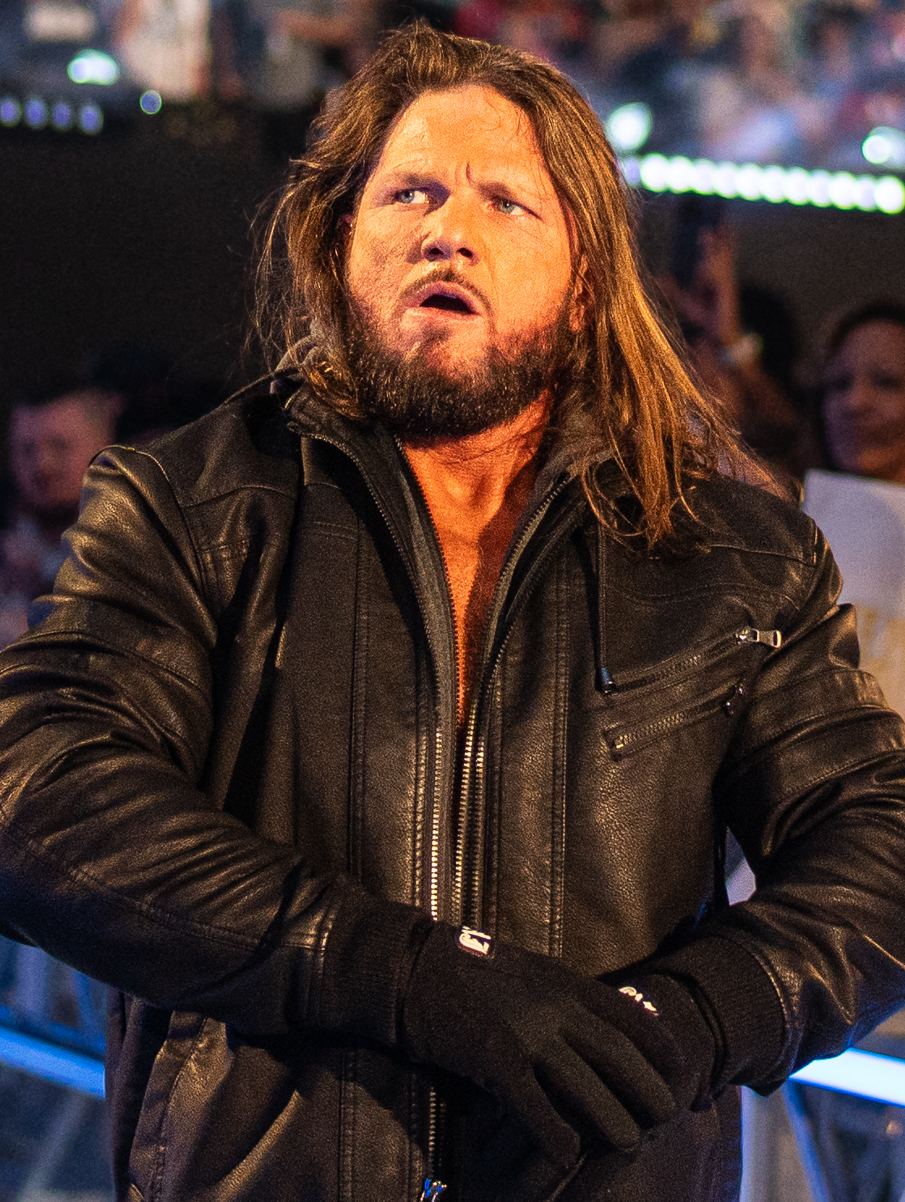
AJ Styles

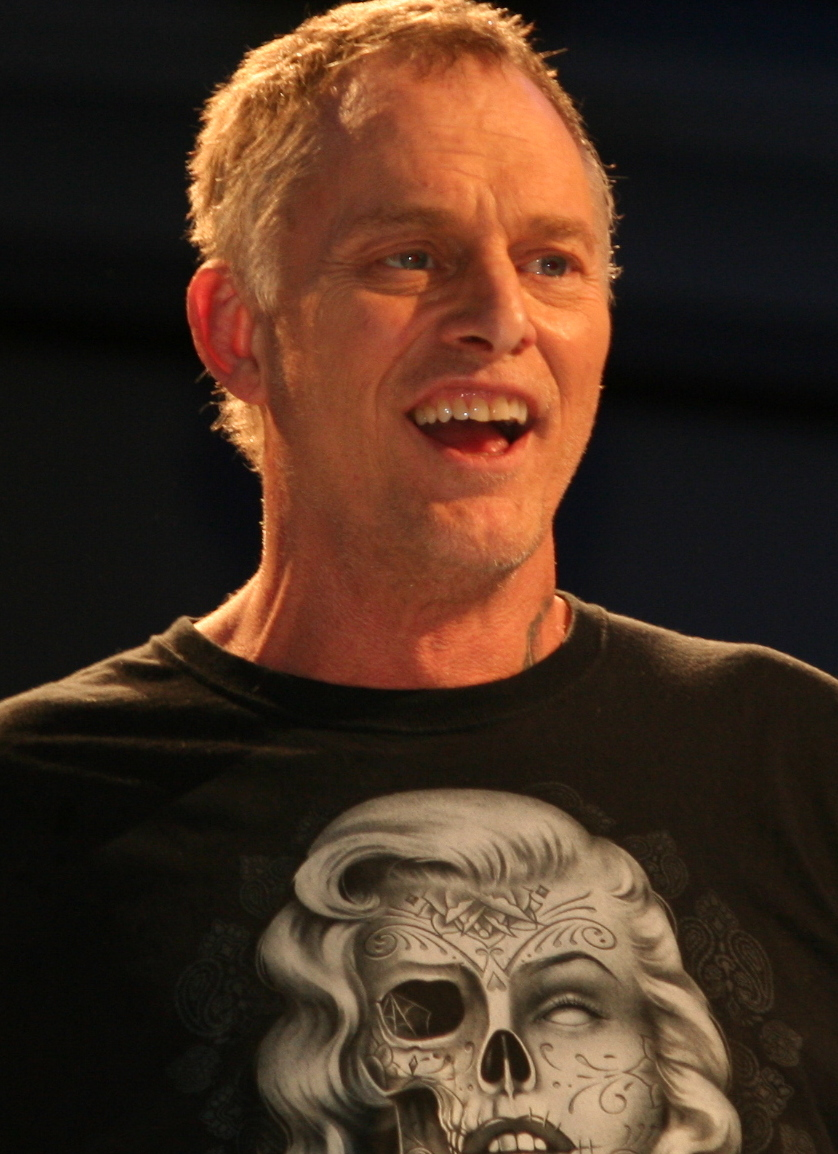
The Sandman

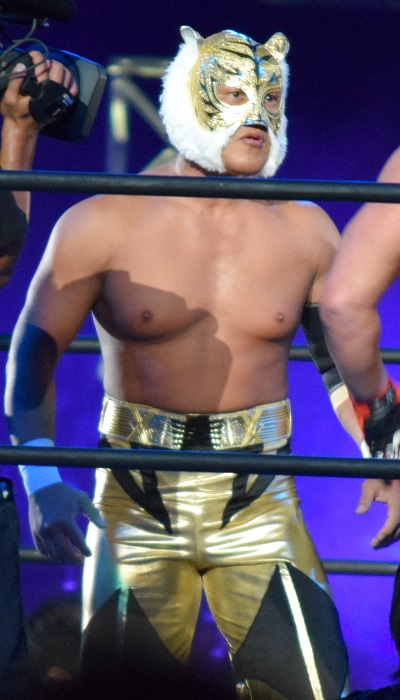
Tiger Mask

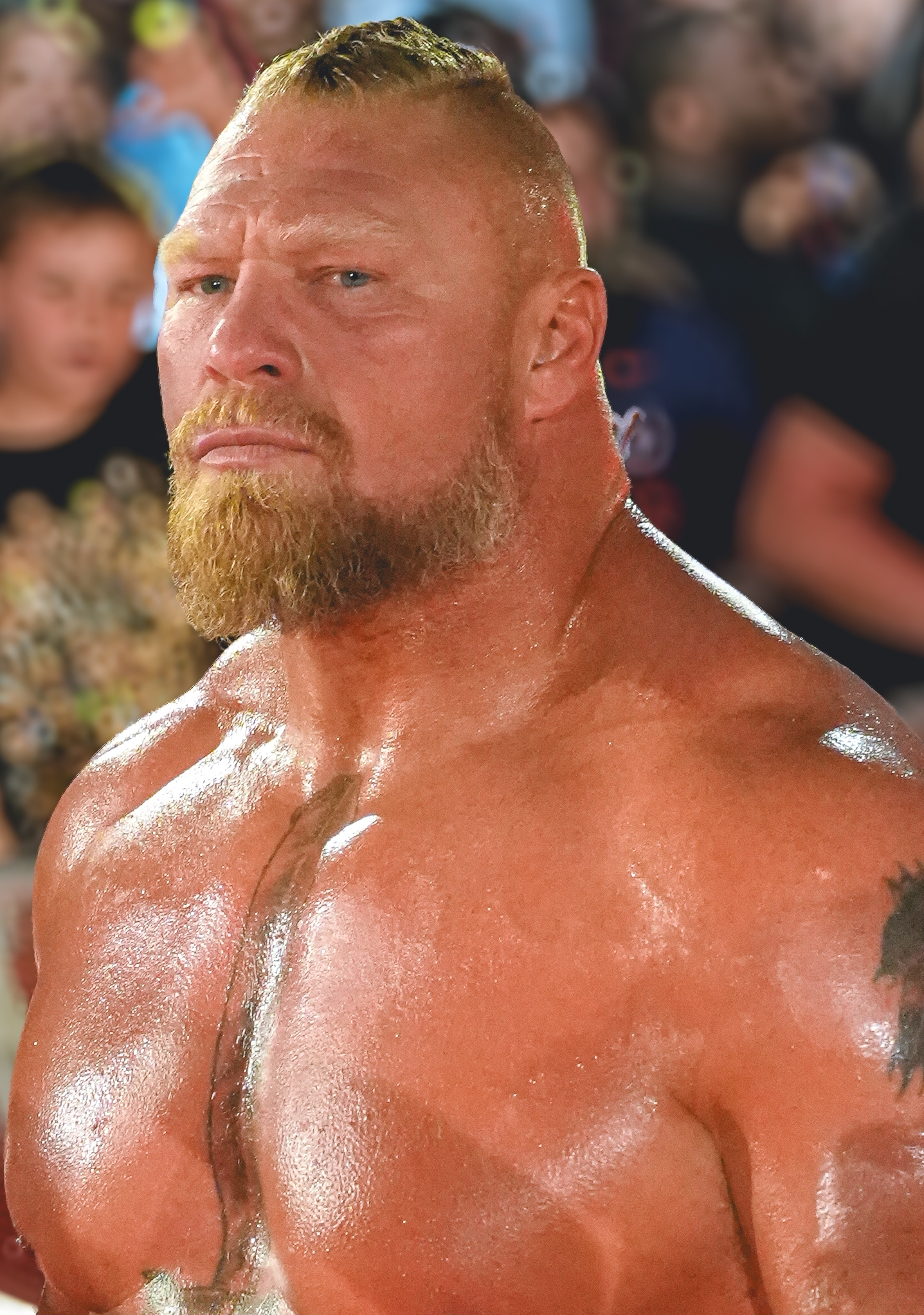
Brock Lesnar

Hiroyoshi Tenzan

- January 1
  - Yuki Miyazaki
  - Madison Rayne
- January 4
  - Hiroshi Tanahashi
  - Brinley Reece
- January 12 – Risa Sera
- January 17 – Fandango
- January 31 – AJ Styles
- February 20 – Kevin Blackwood
- February 25 – Sarah Logan
- March 4 – Koju Takeda
- March 20 – El Satánico
- April 5 – Kazusada Higuchi
- April 17
  - The Sandman
  - Vampiro
- April 18 – Kidd Bandit
- April 25 – Jimmy Valiant
- April 26 – Saki Kashima
- April 27 – Luca Crusifino
- May 7 – Rin Kadokura
- May 31 – Austin Lane
- July 7 – Tiger Mask IV
- July 23 – The Headbangers
- August 1 – Brock Lesnar
- August 15 – Hiroyoshi Tenzan
- August 27 – Mercedes Martinez
- October 15 – Zach Gowen
- October 24 – Angel Medina
- October 30 – Justin Gabriel
- December – Yuki Kamifuku

== Deaths ==
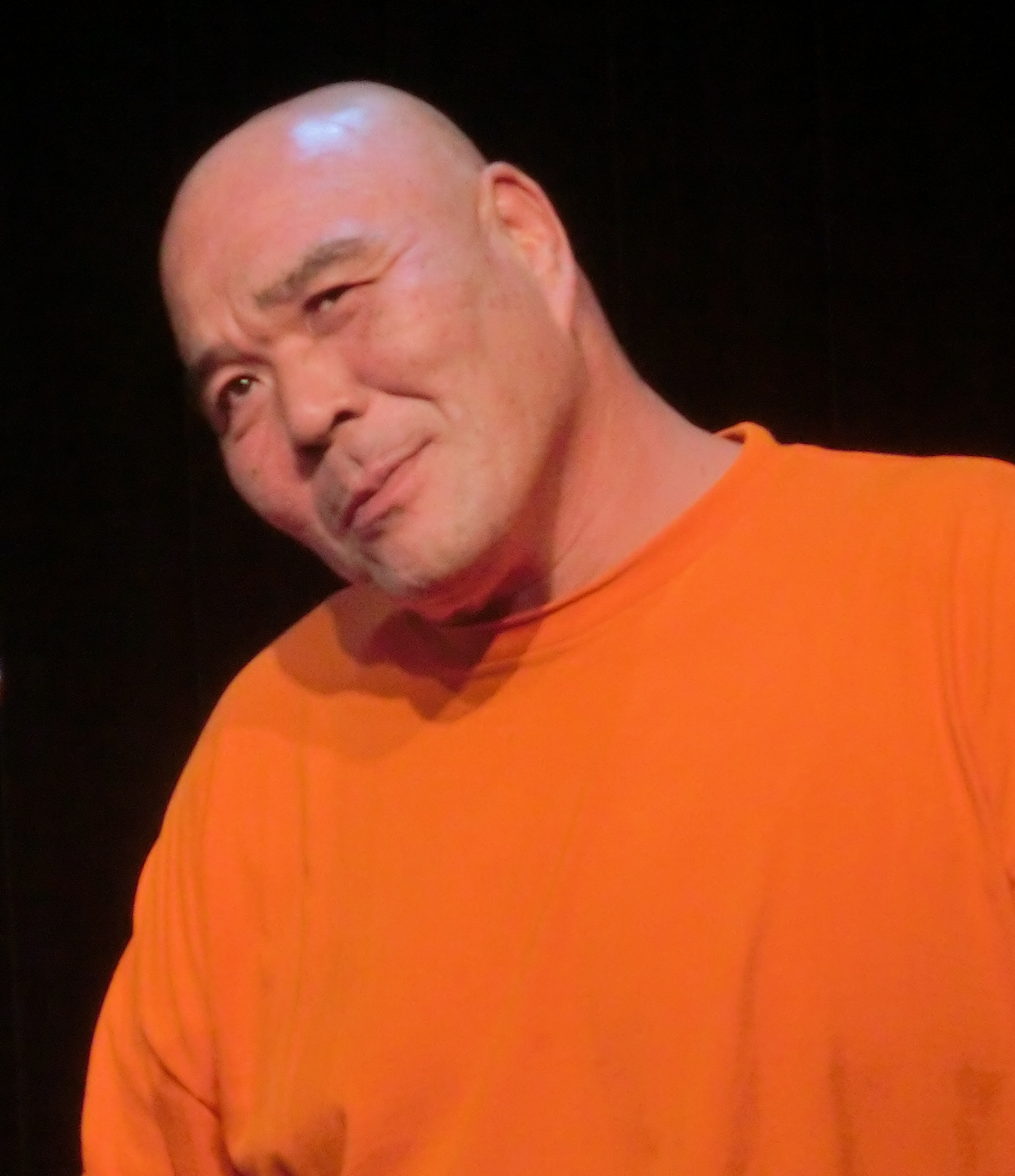
Tadao Yasuda

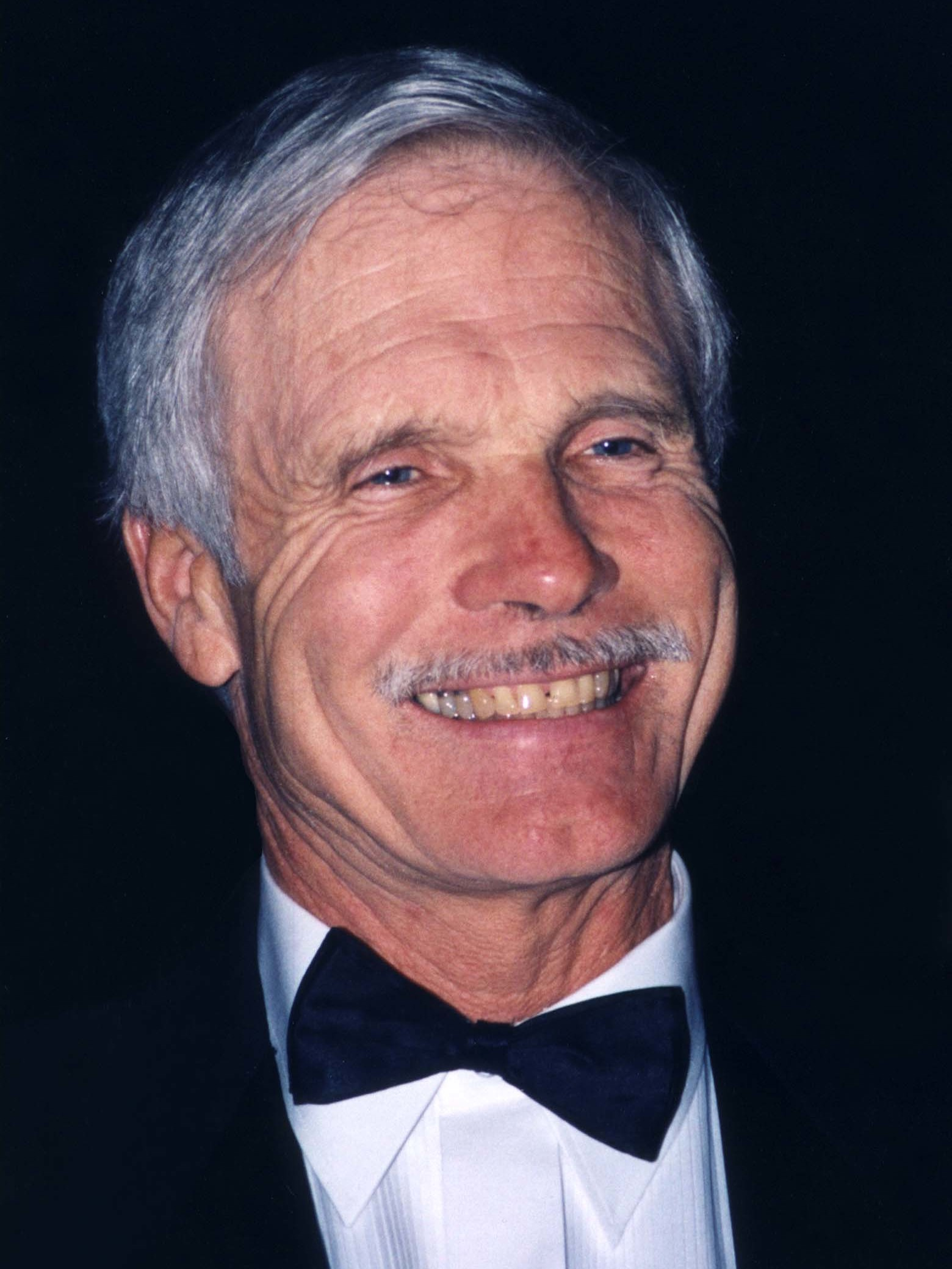
Ted Turner

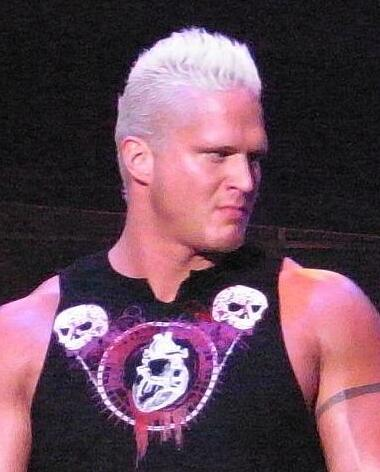
Joe Doering

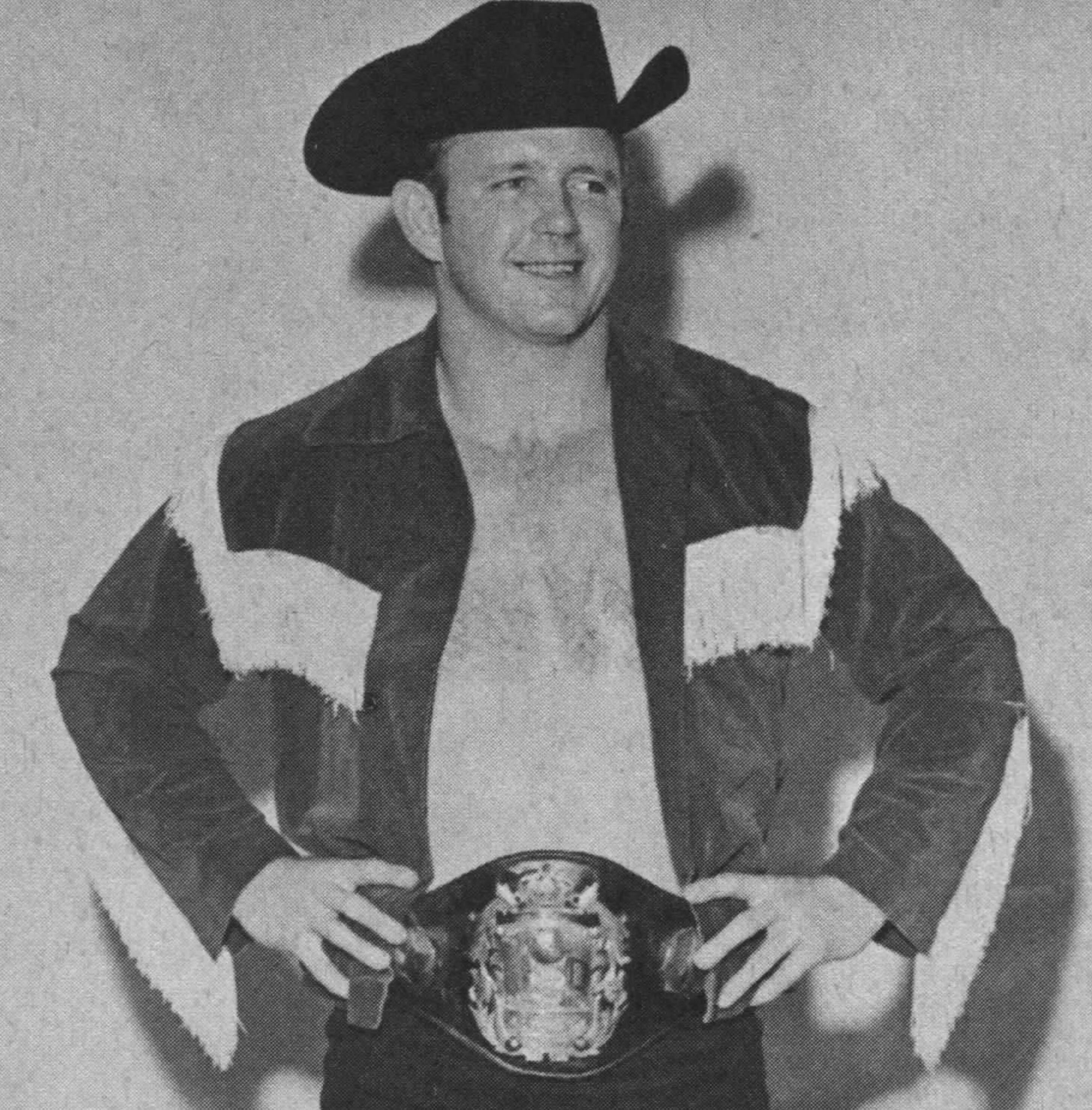
Dory Funk Jr.

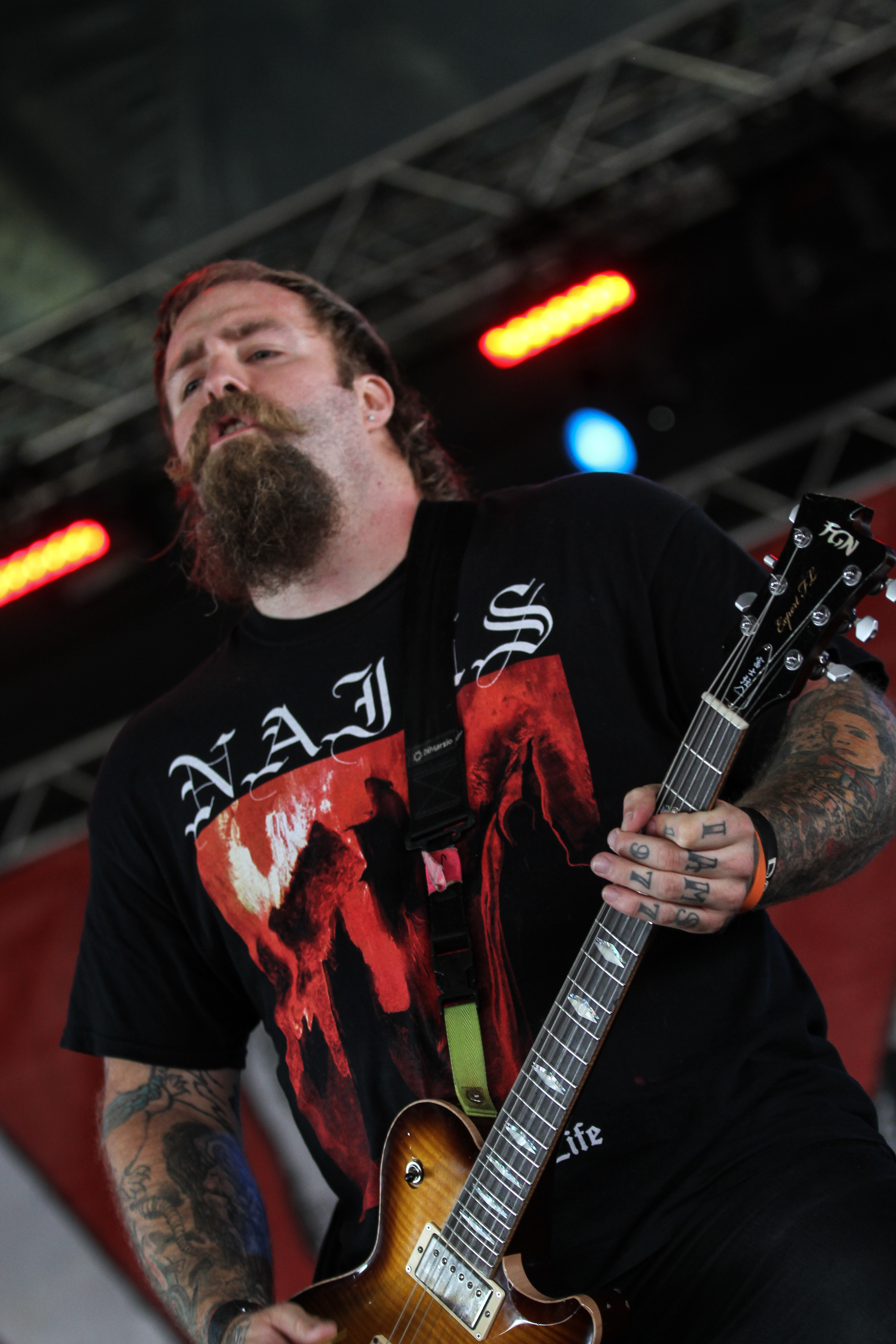
Andy Williams

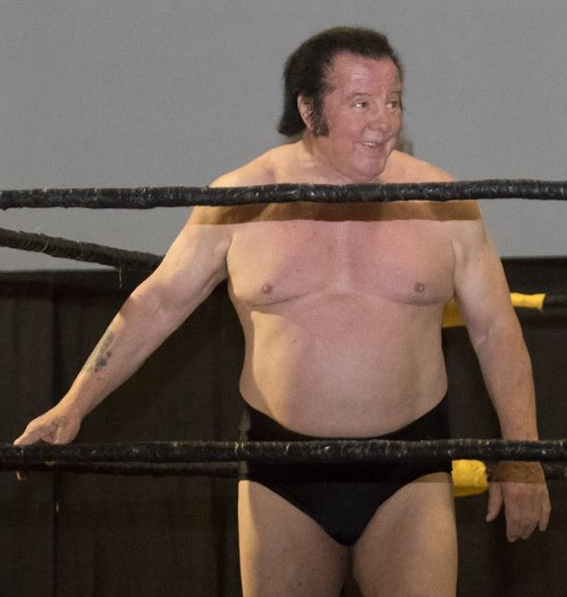
Bill Dundee

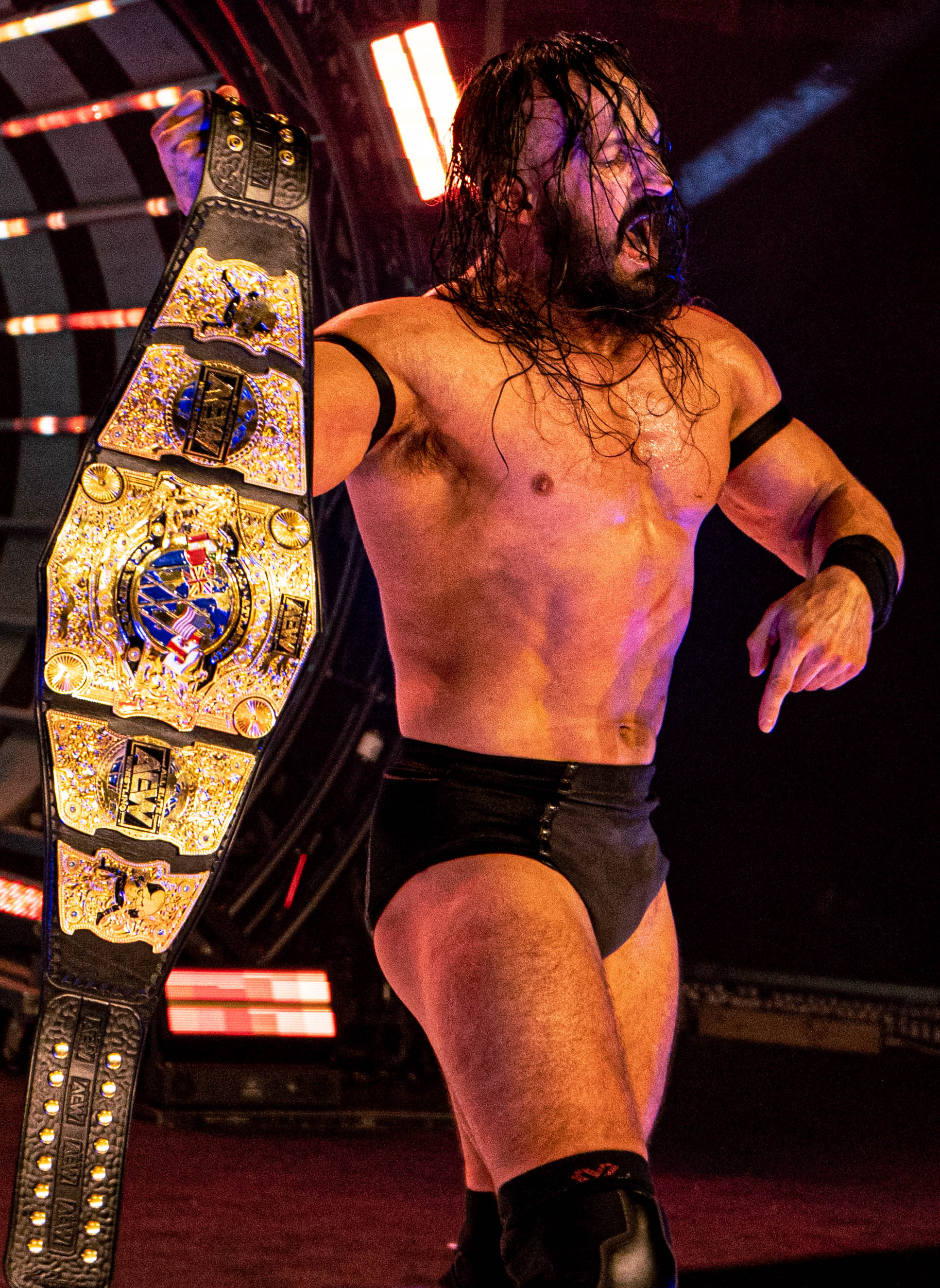
Pac

Bill Watts

- January 2 – Johnny Legend (born 1948)
- January 4 – Bob Boyer (born 1932)
- January 14 – Rick Link (born 1959)
- January 21 – Bobby Duncum (born 1944)
- January 22 – TC Reynolds (Doink the Clown) (born 1956)
- February 2 – Frankie Cain (born 1933)
- February 8 – Tadao Yasuda (born 1963)
- March 20 – Dennis Condrey (born 1952)
- March 24 – DJ Pringle (born 1987)
- April 3 – Fred Curry (born 1943)
- April 7 – Scott Renwick (born 1985)
- April 19 – Van Hammer (born 1959)
- April 24 – Gran Markus Jr. (born 1953)
- May 6 – Ted Turner (born 1938)
- May 20 – Phil Hickerson (born 1946)
- May 25 – Jerry Grey (born 1963)
- June 5 – The Great Kasaki (born 1978)
- June 17 – The Duke of Dorchester (born 1945)
- June 26 – Joe Doering (born 1982)
- July 10 – Doug Stahl (born 1963)
- July 16 – Siva Afi (born 1949)
- August – John Anson (born 1949)
- August 4 – Dory Funk Jr. (born 1941)
- August 8 – Diana La Cazadora (born 1978)
- August 23 – El Solar II (born 1959)
- August 30 – Paul LeDuc (born 1936)
- September 4 – Jerry Oates (born 1945)
- September 5 – Andy "The Butcher" Williams (born 1977)
- September 6 – Bill Dundee (born 1943)
- September 7 – Marc Mercier (born 1958)
- September 12 – Cesar Pabon (born 1928)
- September 18 – Bruce Swayze (born 1940)
- September 18 – Franco Columbo (born 1953)
- September 25 – José Guadalupe Fuentes Ochoa (born 1947)
- September 25 – Jose Jacobs Trujillo (born 1996)
- September 27 – Pac (born 1986)
- September 30 – SoCal Crazy (born 1979)
- September 30 – Eddie Osbourne (born 1983)
- October 1 – Bart Batten (born 1958)
- October 3
  - Metal Maniac (born 1964)
  - Charlie King (born 2000)
- October unknown date - Jim Herd (born 1939)
- October 6 – Gerardo Germán Pineda (born 1951)
- October 8 – Jeff Cannonball (born 1987)
- October 13 – Chase Brown (born 1985)
- October 25
  - Jack Armstrong (born 1947)
  - Jumbo Baretta (born 1966)
- November 17 – Bill Watts (born 1939)

== See also ==
- List of WWE pay-per-view and livestreaming supercards, WWE Raw special episodes, WWE SmackDown special episodes, and WWE NXT special episodes
- List of AEW pay-per-view events, AEW special events, AEW Dynamite special episodes, and AEW Collision special episodes
- List of TNA pay-per-view events and TNA+ Monthly Specials
- List of ROH pay-per-view events and Honor Club exclusive events
- List of NWA pay-per-view events and NWA Special Supercards
- List of MLW events
- List of major NJPW events and NJPW Strong special episodes
- List of major World Wonder Ring Stardom events
- List of major Pro Wrestling Noah events
- List of major DDT Pro-Wrestling events
- List of major Lucha Libre AAA Worldwide events
- List of major Progress Wrestling events
