= List of professional wrestling television series =

This is a list of professional wrestling television series.

== Territory-era (1950s–1970s) ==
Series	Country	Duration	Promotion	No. of episodes	Ref.
Hollywood Wrestling	United States	Syndication: 1947–1955	NWA Hollywood Wrestling		
Championship Wrestling from Florida (CWF)	United States	Syndication: 1949–1987	Championship Wrestling from Florida		
Wrestling from Marigold	United States	DuMont: 1949–1955; WGN-TV: 1955–1957	Fred Kohler Enterprises		
Le Catch	France	RTF/ORTF; Antenne 2 FR3: 1951–1987	FFCP		
Portland Wrestling	United States	Syndication: 1953–1992	Pacific Northwest Wrestling		
JWA Diamond Hour	Japan	NET (Japan): 1969–1973	Japan Pro Wrestling Alliance		
Saturday Night Wrasslin'	United States	Syndication: 1954–1977	American International Wrestling		
Professional Wrestling	United Kingdom	ITV: 1955–1976	Joint Promotions		
Heavyweight Wrestling	United States	DuMont: 1956; Syndication: 1956–1970	Capitol Wrestling Corporation		
Stampede Wrestling	Canada	Syndication: 1957–1989; 1999–2000	Stampede Wrestling		
All Star Wrestling	United States	Syndication: 1958–1979	Big Time Wrestling		
Studio Wrestling	United States	Syndication: 1959–1972			
Wrestling at the Chase	United States	Syndication: 1959–1983	St. Louis Wrestling Club		
50th State Big Time Wrestling	United States	Syndication: 1962–1979	50th State Big Time Wrestling		
Vancouver All-Star Wrestling	Canada	Syndication: 1962–1989	NWA All-Star Wrestling		
Titanes en el ring	Argentina	Canal 9: 1962–1988			
Big Time Wrestling	United States	Syndication: 1964–1980	Big Time Wrestling		
WWA All-Star Championship Wrestling	United States	Syndication: 1964–1989	World Wrestling Association		
World Championship Wrestling	Australia	Channel 9: 1964–1978	World Championship Wrestling		
World of Sport (wrestling slot)	United Kingdom	ITV: 1965–1985	Joint Promotions		
Telecatch	Brazil	TV Excelsior: 1967–1980			
Big Time Wrestling	United States	Syndication: 1971–1979	NWA Big Time Wrestling		
NWA Georgia Championship Wrestling	United States	TBS: 1971–1984	Georgia Championship Wrestling		
WWWF Championship Wrestling	United States	Syndication: 1972–1979	World Wide Wrestling Federation		
All Japan Pro Wrestling	Japan	Nippon TV: 1972–2000	All Japan Pro Wrestling		
NJPW World Pro-Wrestling	Japan	NET: 1973–1977; TV Asahi: 1977–present	New Japan Pro-Wrestling		
Lucha Libre Internacional	Dominican Republic	Canal 9: 1973–1997			
WW(W)F All-Star Wrestling	United States	Syndication: 1974–1986	World Wrestling Federation		
Best of Championship Wrestling	United States	TBS: 1973–1987	Georgia Championship Wrestling; Jim Crockett Promotions		
On the Mat	New Zealand	TV2: 1975–1984	NWA New Zealand		
Superstars of Wrestling	Canada	Syndication: 1975–1984	Canadian-American Wrestling Association		
Wide World Wrestling	United States	Syndication: 1975–1978	Jim Crockett Promotions; National Wrestling Alliance		
CWA Championship Wrestling	United States	WMC-TV: 1977–1989	Continental Wrestling Association		
International Championship Wrestling	United States	Syndication: 1977–1979	International Championship Wrestling		
NWA World Wide Wrestling	United States	Syndication: 1978–1992	Jim Crockett Promotions; National Wrestling Alliance; World Championship Wrestling		
Mid-South Wrestling	United States	Syndication: 1979–1986; TBS: 1985	Mid-South Wrestling		

== 1980s wrestling boom ==
Series	Country	Duration	Promotion	No. of episodes	Ref.
World Class Championship Wrestling	United States	Syndication: 1982–1989; ESPN: 1986–1989	World Class Championship Wrestling		
WWF All American Wrestling	United States	USA Network: 1983–1994	World Wrestling Federation		
WWF on TBS	United States	TBS: 1984–1985	World Wrestling Federation		
WWF Wrestling Spotlight	United States	Syndication: 1984–1995	World Wrestling Federation		
International Championship Wrestling	United States	Syndication: 1984–1995	International World Class Championship Wrestling		
Reslo	United Kingdom	S4C: 1982–1995	BWF		
Professional Wrestling	United Kingdom	ITV: 1985–1988	Joint Promotions, All Star Wrestling, World Wrestling Federation		
Satellite Wrestling Challenge	United Kingdom	Screensport: 1985–1986	All Star Wrestling		
WWF Tuesday Night Titans	United States	USA Network: 1984–1986	World Wrestling Federation	103	
Saturday Night's Main Event	United States	NBC: 1985–1991; 2006–2008; 2024–2025; FOX: 1992	World Wrestling Federation	36	
WWF Prime Time Wrestling	United States	USA Network: 1985–1993	World Wrestling Federation	417	
WWF Wrestling Challenge	United States	Syndication: 1986–1995	World Wrestling Federation		
AWA Championship Wrestling	United States	ESPN: 1985–1990	American Wrestling Association		
WWF Superstars of Wrestling	United States	Syndication: 1986–1996; USA Network: 1996–2000; TNN: 2000–2001	World Wrestling Federation		
Universal Wrestling Federation	United States	Syndication: 1986–1987	Universal Wrestling Federation (Bill Watts)		
GLOW: Gorgeous Ladies of Wrestling	United States	Syndication: 1986–1990, 2001	Gorgeous Ladies of Wrestling		
WWC Superestrellas de la Lucha Libre	Puerto Rico	TeleOnce: 1986–1991; WAPA-TV: 1991–present	World Wrestling Council		
Superstars of Wrestling	United States	Syndication: 1986–1992			
WCW Pro	United States	Syndication: 1986–1998, TBS: 1994–1998	World Championship Wrestling		
Southern Championship Wrestling from Georgia	United States	Syndication: 1988–1990	Southern Championship Wrestling		
EWF Wrestling aka New Catch	France	Eurosport: 1988–1992	European Wrestling Federation		
WWF The Main Event	United States	NBC: 1988–1991	World Wrestling Federation	5 specials	
WCW Clash of the Champions	United States	TBS: 1988–1997	World Championship Wrestling	35 specials	
WCW Main Event	United States	TBS: 1988–1998	World Championship Wrestling		
WCW Power Hour	United States	TBS: 1989–1994	World Championship Wrestling	301	
Legends of World Class Championship Wrestling	United States	ESPN: 1988–1989	World Class Championship Wrestling		
Legends of United States Wrestling Association	United States	ESPN: 1990–1991	United States Wrestling Association		
USWA Championship Wrestling	United States	Syndication: 1989–1996; ESPN 1989–1991	United States Wrestling Association		
UWF Fury Hour	United States	SportsChannel America: 1990–1991; Prime Ticket: 1992; ESPN2: 1995	Universal Wrestling Federation (Herb Abrams)	69	
The Main Event	New Zealand	TV3: 1990	NWA New Zealand		

== 1990s wrestling boom ==
Series	Country	Duration	Promotion	No. of episodes	Ref.
Wrestling	United Kingdom	Grampian/STV 1990, 1993	Joint Promotions (Relwyskow)	4 specials	
World Alliance Wrestling	United Kingdom	Central: 1990	World Alliance Wrestling		
GWF Major League Wrestling	United States	ESPN: 1991–1994	Global Wrestling Federation		
WCW Saturday Night	United States	TBS: 1991–2000	World Championship Wrestling		
Smoky Mountain Wrestling	United States	Syndication: 1992–1995	Smoky Mountain Wrestling		
WCW WorldWide	United States	Syndication: 1992–2001	National Wrestling Alliance; World Championship Wrestling		
CMLL On Televisa	Mexico	Televisa Deportes: 1991–present	Consejo Mundial de Lucha Libre		
CMLL Guadalajara TV	Mexico	Syndication: 1992–2013	Consejo Mundial de Lucha Libre		
AAA Sin Límite	Mexico	Televisa Deportes: 1992–2019	Lucha Libre AAA Worldwide		
ECW Hardcore TV	United States	Syndication: 1993–2000	Extreme Championship Wrestling	401	
BCW Wrestling	Canada	Syndication:1993-2012	Border City Wrestling		
WWE Raw	United States	TNN/Spike TV: 2000–2005; Syfy: 2008; 2009; 2022–2024 (overflow); USA Network: 1993–2000, 2005–2024; Netflix: 2025–present	World Wrestling Entertainment (Raw from 2002)	1712 (as of 16 March 2026)	
WWF Mania	United States	USA Network: 1993–1996	World Wrestling Federation		
WWF Action Zone	United States	Syndication: 1994–1996	World Wrestling Federation		
WWF Sunday Night Slam	United States	USA Network: 1994–1995, Prevue Channel: 1995	World Wrestling Federation	3 specials	
WCW Monday Nitro	United States	TNT: 1995–2001	World Championship Wrestling	288	
AWF Warriors of Wrestling	United States	Syndication: 1995–1996	American Wrestling Federation		
NWC Slammin' TV	United States	Syndication: 1995	National Wrestling Conference	15	
WCW Prime	United States	Prime Sports Network: 1995–1997	World Championship Wrestling		
WWF Free for All	United States	Pay-Per-View: 1996–2009	World Wrestling Federation		
Big Japan Pro Wrestling	Japan	Samurai TV: 1996–present	Big Japan Pro Wrestling		
WWF LiveWire	United States	USA Network: 1996–2000; TNN: 2000–2001	World Wrestling Federation		
Promo Azteca TV	Mexico	TV Azteca: 1996–1998	Promo Azteca		
WWF Friday Night's Main Event	United States	USA Network: 1997	World Wrestling Federation	2 specials	
WWF Shotgun Saturday Night	United States	Syndication: 1997–1999	World Wrestling Federation	62	
OVW TV	United States	Syndication: 1997–2013; Ion Television: 2013–2015; WBNA: 2015–2024; YouTube: 2017–2024	Ohio Valley Wrestling	1275	
WWE Heat	United States	USA Network: 1998–2000; MTV: 2000–2003; TNN/Spike TV: 2003–2005; WWE.com: 2005–2008	World Wrestling Federation (Raw from 2002)	513	
WWF Super Astros	United States	Univision: 1998–1999	World Wrestling Federation	42	
WCW Thunder	United States	TBS: 1998–2001	World Championship Wrestling	156	
ECW on TNN	United States	TNN: 1999–2000	Extreme Championship Wrestling	59	
WWF Jakked/Metal	United States	Syndication: 1999–2002	World Wrestling Federation	193	
UWA Wrestling Rampage	United Kingdom	L!VE TV: 1999	Ultimate Wrestling Alliance	21	
Transatlantic Wrestling Challenge	United Kingdom	Anglia, HTV, Meridian, ITV2: 2000	NWA UK Hammerlock, NWA Wildside	6	

== Modern-era (2002–present) ==
Series	Country	Duration	Promotion	No. of episodes	Ref.
WWE SmackDown	United States	UPN: 1999–2006; The CW: 2006–2008; MyNetworkTV: 2008–2010; Syfy: 2010–2016; FOX: 2019–2024; FS1 (overflow coverage): 2019–2024; USA Network: 2016–2019; 2024–present	World Wrestling Entertainment (SmackDown from 2002)	1387 (as of 20 March 2026)	
WLW-TV	United States	America One: 1999; PAX TV: 1999-??? Syndication: 2018–2019; YouTube: 2018–2019	World League Wrestling		
Ultimate Pro Wrestling	United States	KDOC-TV: 1999–2002	Ultimate Pro Wrestling		
IWA Zona Caliente	Puerto Rico	Canal 2: 2000–2008	IWA Puerto Rico		
WXO Wrestling	United States	Syndication: 2000	The WXO	3	
Women of Wrestling	United States	Syndication: 2000–2001; 2022–present KVCW: 2012–2018; AXS TV: 2019–2020; Pluto TV: 2022–present	Women of Wrestling		
Urban Wrestling Alliance	United States	Syndication: 2000–2001	Urban Wrestling Alliance	8	
PCW Full Throttle	United States	Syndication: 2000–2009	Professional Championship Wrestling		
NOAH Power Hour	Japan	Nippon TV: 2000–2009; NTV G+: 2009–2020	Pro Wrestling Noah		
IWA Impacto Total	Puerto Rico	Telemundo: 2000–2010	IWA Puerto Rico		
XPW TV	United States	KDOC-TV: 2000–2002; FITE TV: 2021–2022; Stream XPW: 2022–2024	Xtreme Pro Wrestling	118	
CZW Fake You TV	United States	WGTW-TV: 2001–2006	Combat Zone Wrestling		
Pro Wrestling Zero1	Japan	Samurai TV: 2001–present	Pro Wrestling Zero1		
WWE Tough Enough	United States	MTV: 2001–2003; UPN: 2004; USA Network: 2011; 2015	World Wrestling Entertainment	68	
WWE Excess	United States	TNN: 2001–2002	World Wrestling Entertainment	37	
High Impact TV	United States	WGTW-TV: 2002-2003	Ring of Honor	20	
XPW Monday Nightmare	United States	WGTW-TV: 2002–2003	Xtreme Pro Wrestling	28	
MCW Rage TV	United States	Syndication: 2002	Maryland Championship Wrestling	10?	
WWE Bottom Line	United States	Syndication: 2002–2025	World Wrestling Entertainment	1104	
Total Nonstop Action	United States	Pay-Per-View: 2002–2004	National Wrestling Alliance; Total Nonstop Action Wrestling	111	
TNA Xplosion	United States	Syndication: 2002–2008; Webcast: 2008–2010; Global Wrestling Network: 2017–2019; Twitch: 2019–2021; TNA+: 2024–present YouTube: 2024–present	Total Nonstop Action Wrestling	933	
WWE Confidential	United States	Spike TV: 2002–2004	World Wrestling Entertainment	83	
Johnny Vaughan's World of Sport	United Kingdom	BBC Three: 2003 (revival of above World Of Sport show, included wrestling slot as per original)	Premier Promotions		
WWE Afterburn	United States	Syndication: 2002–2024	World Wrestling Entertainment	1104	
WWE Velocity	United States	Spike TV: 2002–2005; Webcast: 2005–2006	World Wrestling Entertainment (SmackDown)	204	
WWE Tribute to the Troops	United States	UPN: 2003–2004; USA Network; 2005–2018; NBC: 2008–2014; Fox: 2020–2023	World Wrestling Entertainment (Raw and SmackDown)	20 (as of 13 July 2023)	
Memphis Wrestling	United States	WLMT: 2003–2006; 2008–2014	Memphis Wrestling		
MLW Underground TV	United States	Syndication: 2003–2004	Major League Wrestling		
WWE Diva Search	United States	Spike: 2004–2005; USA Network: 2006; UPN: 2006; WWE.com: 2007	World Wrestling Entertainment	6	
FWA TV	United Kingdom	Portsmouth TV: 2001; The Wrestling Channel: 2004–2005	Frontier Wrestling Alliance		
WWP Thunderstrike	South Africa	SABC 2: 2004–2009	World Wrestling Professionals	100	
AWF on E Slam Series	South Africa	e.tv: 2004	Africa Wrestling Alliance		
IWRG on TVC Deportes	Mexico	TVC Deportes: 2004–2013	International Wrestling Revolution Group		
Dragon Gate	Japan	Gaora TV: 2004–present	Dragon Gate		
WWE Experience	United States	Spike TV and syndication: 2004–2020	World Wrestling Entertainment		
TNA Impact!	United States	Fox Sports Net: 2004–2005; TNAwrestling.com: 2005; Urban America Television: 2005; Spike: 2005–2014; Destination America: 2015; Pop: 2016–2019; Pursuit Channel: 2019; Twitch: 2019–2021; AXS TV: 2019–2026; TNA+: 2024–present New England Sports Network: 2025–present AMC: 2026–present	Total Nonstop Action Wrestling	1118 (as of 15 January 2026)	
NWE Destiny	Italy	LA7 Sport: 2005–2006	Nu-Wrestling Evolution		
Memphis Wrestling Primetime	United States	WLMT: 2006–2008	Memphis Wrestling		
AWE/WFX Overload	Canada	Fight Network: 2006; America One: 2010	Action Wrestling Entertainment; Wrestling Fan Xperience		
CMLL Guerreros del Ring	Mexico	MVS TV: 2006–present	Consejo Mundial de Lucha Libre		
IWF Wrestling	Russia	Semyorka: 2006–2010	Independent Wrestling Federation		
IWW Whiplash TV	Ireland	The Wrestling Channel: 2006–2008	Irish Whip Wrestling		
WWE ECW	United States	Syfy: 2006–2010	World Wrestling Entertainment (ECW)	193	
Real Quality Wrestling	United Kingdom	The Wrestling Channel: 2006–2009	Real Quality Wrestling		
100% Lucha	Argentina	Telefe: 2006–2008			
Wrestling Society X	United States	MTV: 2007	Big Vision Entertainment	10	
IPW Ignition	New Zealand	ALT TV: 2007–2011	Impact Pro Wrestling		
LDN Wrestling Capital TV	United Kingdom	The Wrestling Channel: 2007–2008	LDN Wrestling		
Wrestling Reality	Canada	Fight Network: 2007			
Dramatic Dream Team	Japan	Samurai TV: 2007–present	DDT Pro-Wrestling		
SlamTV!	United States	Webcast: 2007–2008	Juggalo Championship Wrestling	21	
TNA Today	United States	Webcast: 2007–2012	Total Nonstop Action Wrestling		
CMLL On CadenaTres	Mexico	Cadenatres: 2007–2015	Consejo Mundial de Lucha Libre		
Tercera Caida	Mexico	TVC Deportes: 2007–2012	TVC Deportes		
Todos x el Todos	Mexico	TVC Deportes: 2007–2012	TVC Deportes		
PDM on TVC Deportes	Mexico	TVC Deportes: 2009–2012	Los Perros del Mal		
WWE Vintage	United States	Various: 2008–present	World Wrestling Entertainment	467 (as of 11 May 2017)	
Hulk Hogan's Celebrity Championship Wrestling	United States	CMT: 2008		8	
FCW TV	United States	Bright House Sports Network: 2008–2012	Florida Championship Wrestling; World Wrestling Entertainment	197	
IWA Pro Wrestling	Australia	Aurora: 2008–2009	International Wrestling Australia		
100% De Dana Dan	India	Colors: 2009	World Wrestling Professionals	26	
EPW Monday Night Wrestling	Australia	Access 31: 2008–2010	Explosive Pro Wrestling		
NZWPW Invasion	New Zealand	Triangle TV: 2008–2009	New Zealand Wide Pro Wrestling		
Off the Ropes	New Zealand	Prime TV: 2009–2010	Kiwi Pro Wrestling	12	
Ring of Honor Wrestling	United States	HDNet: 2009–2011; Sinclair stations: 2011–2022; Destination America: 2015; NESN: 2015–2022; Cox Sports Television: 2018–2019; Fox Sports Networks: 2019–2021; Honor Club: 2023–present	Ring of Honor	653 (as of 13 July 2023)	
AAA Lucha Libre Premier	Mexico	Fox Sports: 2009–2010	Asistencia Asesoría y Administración	30	
Kardinal Sinners	Canada	Rush HD: 2009–2010			
PDM on TVC Deportes	Mexico	TVC Deportes: 2009–2012	Los Perros del Mal		
WWE Superstars	United States	WGN America: 2009–2011; WWE.com: 2011–2012; Hulu Plus: 2012–2016; WWE Network: 2014–2016	World Wrestling Entertainment	398	
This is AWF Wrestling	Australia	Foxtel: 2010–2011	Australasian Wrestling Federation		
CMLL Puebla	Mexico	TVC Deportes: 2008–present	Consejo Mundial de Lucha Libre		
Lucha Azteca (CMLL)	Mexico	Azteca 7: 2009–2018	Consejo Mundial de Lucha Libre		
DWE Zona de Impacto	Dominican Republic	Canal 9: 2010–present	Dominican Wrestling Entertainment		
DTU TV	Mexico	TVC Deportes: 2010–2014	Desastre Total Ultraviolento		
Lucha Libre USA: Masked Warriors	United States	MTV2: 2010–2012	Lucha Libre USA	20	
WWE NXT	United States	Syfy: 2010; WWE.com: 2010–2012; WWE Network: 2014–2019; USA Network: 2019–2024; The CW: 2024–present	World Wrestling Entertainment (NXT)	829 (as of 17 March 2026)	
UWN Championship Wrestling	United States	KDOC-TV: 2010–present MAVTV: 2013–present Youtoo America: 2015–present Z Living: 2019–present YouTube: 2019–2024; 2025–present	United Wrestling Network	498 (As of 18 July 2025)	
TNA Reaction	United States	Spike: 2010	Total Nonstop Action Wrestling	23	
Mana Mamau	New Zealand	Māori Television: 2011–2012	Impact Pro Wrestling	40	
World of Hurt	Canada	Trace: 2011–2012	Storm Wrestling Academy	16	
CMLL on Fox Sports	Mexico	Fox Sports: 2011–2015	Consejo Mundial de Lucha Libre		
UK Wrestling Mayhem	United Kingdom	My Channel: 2011–2012	UK Wrestling	46	
Turkish Power Wrestling	Turkey	UZMANTV: 2011–2012	Turkish Power Wrestling		
WWE Saturday Morning Slam	United States	The CW (Vortexx): 2012–2013	World Wrestling Entertainment	38	
AAA Fusion	Mexico	TVC Deportes: 2012–2013	Asistencia Asesoría y Administración		
Ring Ka King	India	Colors: 2012	Ring Ka King (Total Nonstop Action Wrestling)	26	
IWRG Zona XXI	Mexico	Canal 158 Cablevision: 2012–present	International Wrestling Revolution Group		
WWE Main Event	United States	Ion Television: 2012–2014; Hulu: 2012–2024; WWE Network and Peacock: 2014–2025; YouTube: 2026–present Rumble: Beginning October 14, 2026	World Wrestling Entertainment (Raw and NXT)	758 (as of 15 January 2026)	
Top of the World	Canada	RDS2: 2013–2014	Top of the World Wrestling		
EPW Overload	Italy	GXT: 2013–2014	European Pro Wrestling		
TNA British Boot Camp	United Kingdom	Challenge: 2013–2014	Total Nonstop Action Wrestling	14	
Wrestle-1	Japan	Gaora TV: 2013–2020	Wrestle-1		
Victory Wrestling Showcase	Canada	Rogers TV: 2013–present	Victory Commonwealth Wrestling		
WWL Campeones del Ring	Puerto Rico	WSTE-DT: 2013–2014	World Wrestling League		
WWE Beyond the Ring	United States	WWE Network: 2014	World Wrestling Entertainment	28	
WWE Legends' House	United States	WWE Network: 2014	World Wrestling Entertainment	10	
WWE Slam City	United States	WWE Network: 2014; Nicktoons: 2014	World Wrestling Entertainment	26	
WLW Showdown	United States	Syndication: 2019–present YouTube: 2019–present	World League Wrestling; National Wrestling Alliance		
Reality of Wrestling TV	United States	Syndication: 2014–present YouTube: 2018–present	Reality of Wrestling		
West Coast Wrestling Connection	United States	KPDX: 2014–present	West Coast Wrestling Connection	40 (as of 1 March 2015)	
Wrestling Retribution Project	United States	Justin.tv: 2014			
AAW Pro Wrestling	United States	MaddyGTV: 2014–2015	All American Wrestling	32	
WAW Epic Encounters	United Kingdom	My Channel: 2014–2015	World Association of Wrestling	20	
Lucha Underground	United States	El Rey Network: 2014–2018	Lucha Underground	127	
Paragon Pro Wrestling	United States	Pop: 2015	Paragon Pro Wrestling		
ICW Fight Club	United Kingdom	My Channel: 2011–2012; Nuvolari: 2016–2017; ICW On Demand: 2017–2022; WWE Network: 2020-2023; FITE TV: 2023	Insane Championship Wrestling		
Lucha Azteca (Elite)	Mexico	Azteca 7: 2014–2018	Lucha Libre Elite		
CMLL on Claro Sports	Mexico	Claro Sports: 2015–present	Consejo Mundial de Lucha Libre		
EWF on Sirk TV	United States	SirkTV: 2016–present	Empire Wrestling Federation		
WCPW/Defiant Loaded	United Kingdom	YouTube: 2016–2019	WhatCulture Pro Wrestling/Defiant Wrestling	60	
World of Sport Wrestling	United Kingdom	ITV: 2016, 2018	World of Sport Wrestling	11 + unscreened pilot	
WAW Wrestling	United Kingdom	Mustard TV: 2016–present	World Association of Wrestling		
WWE 205 Live	United States	WWE Network and Peacock: 2016–2022	World Wrestling Entertainment (Raw, 205 Live and NXT)	270	
Rocky Mountain Pro Charged	United States	FITE TV: 2017–2023; YouTube: 2017–present Twitch: 2018–2024; Rumble: 2023–present Right Now TV: 2023–present	Rocky Mountain Pro Wrestling		
WWE Wal3ooha	United Arab Emirates	OSN Sports: 2017–present	World Wrestling Entertainment	7 (as of 15 June 2017)	
NWA Ten Pounds of Gold	United States	YouTube: 2017	National Wrestling Alliance		
CMLL on InterneTV	Mexico	InterneTV: 2017–present	Consejo Mundial de Lucha Libre		
MLW Fusion	United States	beIN Sports USA: 2018–2023;2026–present Fubo Sports Network:2020–2021; YouTube: 2020–2022; 2023;2026–present	Major League Wrestling	194 (As of 14 December 2023)	
WWE Mixed Match Challenge	United States	Facebook Watch / WWE Network: 2018	World Wrestling Entertainment	25	
Ring Warriors	United States	WGN America: 2018	Ring Warriors	13	
NXT UK	United Kingdom	WWE Network: 2018–2020; BT Sport: 2020–2022; Paramount Network: 2020–2022; Channel 5: 2020–2022	World Wrestling Entertainment (NXT UK)	215	
Lucha Azteca (AAA)	Mexico	Azteca 7: 2019–2026	Asistencia Asesoría y Administración		
CMLL on Marca	Mexico	Marca: 2019–present	Consejo Mundial de Lucha Libre		
CMLL on Ticketmaster Live	Mexico	Ticketmaster Live: 2019–present	Consejo Mundial de Lucha Libre		
OVW Overdrive	United States	YouTube: 2019–present	Ohio Valley Wrestling	106	
AEW Dynamite	United States	TNT: 2019–2021; TruTV: 2019; TBS: 2022–present HBO Max: 2025–present	All Elite Wrestling	329 (as of 21 January 2026)	
Memphis Wrestling	United States	WLMT: 2019–2023; YouTube: 2021–present Triller TV: 2025–present WMC-TV: 2023–present	United Wrestling Network; Memphis Wrestling	256	
NWA Powerrr	United States	YouTube: 2019–2020; 2022–2023; FITE TV: 2021–2022; The CW App: 2024; X: 2024–2025; Roku Sports Channel: 2025–2026; Comet: 2026-present	National Wrestling Alliance	138 (as of 19 December 2023)	
AEW Dark	United States	YouTube: 2019–2023; 2025	All Elite Wrestling	194	
CCW Alive Wrestling	United States	YouTube: 2020–present	Coastal Championship Wrestling	226	
WWN Proving Ground	United States	YouTube: 2020–present	American Combat Wrestling (2020–2021); World Wrestling Network (2020–present)	129 (as of March 2025)	
UWN Primetime Live	United States	FITE TV: 2020	United Wrestling Network; National Wrestling Alliance	12	
NJPW Strong	Japan; United States	NJPW World: 2020–2023	New Japan Pro-Wrestling	126	
NWA Shockwave	United States	YouTube: 2020–2021	National Wrestling Alliance	4	
AEW Dark: Elevation	United States	YouTube: 2021–2023	All Elite Wrestling	112	
DPW Fire	United States	YouTube; DPW On Demand: 2021–2022	Deadlock Pro-Wrestling	11	
Before the Impact	United States	AXS TV: 2021–2022; Impact Plus: 2022–2023	Impact Wrestling	141	
Championship Wrestling from Atlanta	United States	Syndication; YouTube: 2021	United Wrestling Network	11 (as of January 21, 2026)	
AEW Rampage	United States	TNT: 2021–2024; TBS (overflow coverage): 2024	All Elite Wrestling	177	
MLW Fusion: Alpha	United States	FITE TV: 2021; BeIN Sports: 2021; YouTube: 2021	Major League Wrestling	13	
AEW Battle of the Belts	United States	TNT: 2022–2024	All Elite Wrestling	12	
JCP Wide World of Wrestling	United States	YouTube: 2022–2023	Joe Cazana Promotions	32	
NWA USA	United States	YouTube: 2022–2023	National Wrestling Alliance		
WWE NXT Level Up	United States	Peacock: 2022–2024	World Wrestling Entertainment (NXT)	150	
DPCW Paradox	United States	YouTube: 2023–present	Dogg Pound Championship Wrestling; National Wrestling Alliance	17	
Monday Magic	Japan	Wrestle Universe: 2023-present	Pro Wrestling NOAH	25	
MLW Underground Wrestling	United States	Reelz: 2023	Major League Wrestling	13	
Derby City Wrestling	United States	WBKI: 2023–2024; YouTube: 2023–2024	United Wrestling Network	24	
AEW Collision	United States	TNT: 2023–present TBS (overflow coverage): 2024–present HBO Max: 2025–present	All Elite Wrestling	85 (as of 15 March 2025)	
NWA JCP Southeast	United States	YouTube: 2024–2026	Joe Cazana Promotions; National Wrestling Alliance	78	
OVW Rise	United States	Syndication: 2024–present WBNA: 2024–present YouTube: 2024–present	Ohio Valley Wrestling	41	
WWE Speed	United States	X: 2024–2025	World Wrestling Entertainment	76	
JCW Lunacy	United States	YouTube; Facebook: 2024–present	Juggalo Championship Wrestling	82 (as of May 20, 2026)	
WWE Legends & Future Greats	United States	A&E: 2025–present	World Wrestling Entertainment (Evolve, NXT and WWE ID)		
WWE Evolve	United States	Tubi: 2025–present	World Wrestling Entertainment (Evolve)	52 (as of 18 March 2026)	
1FW TV	United States	Peachtree Sports Network: 2025–present Triller TV: 2025–present MyAEW: 2026–present	1 Fall Wrestling	42	
WXM Ground Zero	India	YouTube: 2025–2026	Wrestling Xtreme Mania	24	
Lucha Libre AAA	Mexico	Fox; 2026–present Tubi: 2026–present Fox One: 2026–present	Lucha Libre AAA Worldwide; World Wrestling Entertainment	8 (as of March 7, 2026)	
Gotham Wrestling	United States	Syndication: 2026–present YouTube: 2026–present	United Wrestling Network	18 (as of July 21, 2026)	
NWA JCP Glorrry	United States	Syndication: 2026–present YouTube: 2026–present	Joe Cazana Promotions; National Wrestling Alliance	6 (as of June 26, 2026)	
MLP Mayhem	Canada	TSN2: 2026–present	Maple Leaf Pro Wrestling		

== International broadcasters ==
Series	Country	Duration	Promotion	No. of episodes	Notes
New Japan Pro-Wrestling	Japan; United States	AXS TV: 2014–2019, 2020–2025; The Roku Channel: 2020–2025	New Japan Pro-Wrestling		Hightlights show for various New Japan Pro-Wrestling events
Consejo Mundial de Lucha Libre	Mexico; United States	LATV: 2007–present	Consejo Mundial de Lucha Libre		
NXT UK	United Kingdom; United States	WWE Network: 2018–2021; Peacock: 2021–2022	World Wrestling Entertainment (NXT UK)	215	
TNA Impact!	United States; Canada	Fight Network: 2015–present GameTV: 2016–present Sportsnet 360: 2025–present	Total Nonstop Action Wrestling		
WWE Saturday Night's Main Event	United States; International	YouTube: 2024–present	World Wrestling Entertainment		
WWE Evolve	United States; International	YouTube: 2025–present	World Wrestling Entertainment (Evolve)		
TNA Xplosion	United States; United Kingdom	Challenge: 2011–2017; 5Star: 2017–2018	Total Nonstop Action Wrestling		
Lucha Libre AAA	Mexico; International	YouTube and Facebook: 2026–present	World Wrestling Entertainment; Lucha Libre AAA Worldwide		
MLP Mayhem	Canada; International	MyAEW and Fight Nation: 2026–present	Maple Leaf Pro Wrestling		English language feed on MyAEW along with a French-language feed on Fight Nation

== See also ==
- Monday Night War
- Wednesday Night Wars
- List of professional wrestling streaming services
- List of WWE broadcasters
- List of WWE television programming
- List of Total Nonstop Action Wrestling programming
