= Monday Magic =

Japanese professional wrestling television program

- Genre: Professional wrestling
- Created by: CyberFight; Pro Wrestling NOAH
- Starring: NOAH roster
- Country of origin: Japan
- Original language: Japanese
- No. of seasons: 7
- No. of episodes: 27

Production
- Producer: Nosawa Rongai
- Camera setup: Multicamera setup
- Production company: CyberFight

Original release
- Network: Wrestle Universe
- Release: October 9, 2023 – present

Monday Magic is a professional wrestling streaming television program produced by CyberFight and Pro Wrestling NOAH. The show first premiered on October 9, 2023 on Wrestle Universe.

== History ==
On July 16, 2023, Pro Wrestling Noah announced that they would begin running a seasonal television program titled "Monday Magic" with the first event taking place on October 9, 2023. The first episode took place at Shinjuku FACE in Tokyo, Japan and was streamed live on Wrestle Universe with the main event being between Kenoh and the Great Mummy.

On October 9, 2023, Nosawa Rongai, Noah's booker, had announced on the debut Monday Magic episode that the promotion had revived the GHC Openweight Hardcore Championship and planned to crown it in a match between Ninja Mack and an unnamed opponent who was later announced to be Masato Tanaka. However, Tanaka won the championship.

On November 27, 2023 on the 4th episode of Monday Magic, Ninja Mack won the GHC Openweight Hardcore Championship in a three way match against the defending champion Masato Tanaka and Super Crazy.

On October 28, 2024, Noah announced the introduction of the GHC Women's Championship with the first champion being crowned on the November 11, 2024 episode in a battle royal. The first GHC Women's Champion to be crowned was Kouki Amarei.

On the November 11, 2024 episode of Monday Magic, Titus Alexander won the West Coast Pro Heavyweight Championship after defeating Kevin Blackwood.

On the May 18, 2026 episode of Monday Magic, Mayu Iwatani announced that she had vacated the GHC Women's Championship due to two fractures in her big toe.

== Seasons ==
=== Season 1 ===
Episode No.	Date	Venue	Location	Main Event	Notes
1	October 9, 2023	Shinjuku FACE	Tokyo, Japan	Kenoh vs. The Great Mummy	
2	October 23, 2023	Shinjuku FACE	Tokyo, Japan	GLG (Jack Morris, Jake Lee, LJ Cleary, Tadasuke and Yo-Hey) vs. Alpha Wolf, Daiki Inaba, Dragon Bane, Kaito Kiyomiya, Manabu Soya and Masa Kitamiya in a twelve-man tag team elimination match	
3	November 13, 2023	Shinjuku FACE	Tokyo, Japan	Kaito Kiyomiya, Ryohei Oiwa, and Yuma Anzai vs. GLG (Anthony Greene, Jake Lee, and LJ Cleary) in a six-man tag team match	
4	November 27, 2023	Shinjuku FACE	Tokyo, Japan	Kenoh and Satoshi Kojima vs. Go Shiozaki and Manabu Soya	
5	December 18, 2023	Shinjuku FACE	Tokyo, Japan	Kaito Kiyomiya vs. Ryohei Oiwa	
(c) – refers to the champion(s) heading into the match

=== Season 2 ===
Episode No.	Date	Venue	Location	Main Event	Notes
1	April 1, 2024	Shinjuku FACE	Tokyo, Japan	Kaito Kiyomiya vs. Ulka Sasaki	
2	April 8, 2024	Shinjuku FACE	Tokyo, Japan	GLG (Tadasuke and Yo-Hey) (c) vs. Yankee Two Kenju (Isami Kodaka and Yuko Miyamoto) for the GHC Junior Heavyweight Tag Team Championship	
3	April 15, 2024	Shinjuku FACE	Tokyo, Japan	Ninja Mack (c) vs. Alpha Wolf for the GHC Openweight Hardcore Championship	
4	April 22, 2024	Shinjuku FACE	Tokyo, Japan	Jake Lee vs. Kaito Kiyomiya in a #1 contendership match for the GHC Heavyweight Championship	
(c) – refers to the champion(s) heading into the match

=== Autumn Season ===
Episode No.	Date	Venue	Location	Main Event	Notes
1	October 21, 2024	Shinjuku FACE	Tokyo, Japan	Manabu Soya and Masa Kitamiya vs. Kenoh and Yuji Nagata	
2	October 28, 2024	Shinjuku FACE	Tokyo, Japan	Ulka Sasaki vs. Masaaki Mochizuki	
3	November 11, 2024	Shinjuku FACE	Tokyo, Japan	All Rebellion (Kai Fujimura and Kaito Kiyomiya) vs. Takashi Sugiura and Yu Owada	
4	November 18, 2024	Shinjuku FACE	Tokyo, Japan	Shuji Ishikawa (c) vs. Masato Tanaka for the GHC Openweight Hardcore Championship	
5	November 25, 2024	Shinjuku FACE	Tokyo, Japan	Kaito Kiyomiya (c) vs. Brian Kendrick for the GHC Openweight Hardcore Championship	
(c) – refers to the champion(s) heading into the match

=== Prime Time Season ===
Episode No.	Date	Venue	Location	Main Event	Notes
1	May 26, 2025	Shinjuku FACE	Tokyo, Japan	Kaito Kiyomiya and Titus Alexander vs. Minoru Suzuki and Ryan Clancy	
2	June 2, 2025	Shinjuku FACE	Tokyo, Japan	Shuji Ishikawa (c) vs. Manabu Soya for the GHC Openweight Hardcore Championship	
3	June 16, 2025	Shinjuku FACE	Tokyo, Japan	Ulka Sasaki vs. Fuminori Abe	
4	June 23, 2025	Shinjuku FACE	Tokyo, Japan	Archie Cole, Dragon Bane, Kaito Kiyomiya, and Titus Alexander vs. Danny Duggan, Robert Martyr, Ryan Clancy, and Ulka Sasaki in an eight-man tag team match	
(c) – refers to the champion(s) heading into the match

=== Xtreme Season ===
Episode No.	Date	Venue	Location	Main Event	Notes
1	October 6, 2025	Shinjuku FACE	Tokyo, Japan	Hayata (c) vs. Yuko Miyamoto for the GHC Openweight Hardcore Championship	
2	October 20, 2025	Shinjuku FACE	Tokyo, Japan	Daichi Hashimoto and Kaito Kiyomiya vs. Kenoh and Titus Alexander	
3	October 27, 2025	Shinjuku FACE	Tokyo, Japan	Hayata (c) vs. Naruki Doi vs. Starboy Charlie in a three way match for the GHC Openweight Hardcore Championship	
(c) – refers to the champion(s) heading into the match

=== Rising Sun Season ===
Episode No.	Date	Venue	Location	Main Event	Notes
1	January 19, 2026	Shinjuku FACE	Tokyo, Japan	Hayata (c) vs. Titus Alexander for the GHC Openweight Hardcore Championship	
2	January 26, 2026	Shinjuku FACE	Tokyo, Japan	Alejandro, Dragon Kid, and Hayabusa vs. Hayata, Mazada, and Shuji Kondo in a six-man tag team match	
3	February 2, 2026	Shinjuku FACE	Tokyo, Japan	Kaito Kiyomiya vs. Izzy James	
4	February 9, 2026	Shinjuku FACE	Tokyo, Japan	Mayu Iwatani (c) vs. Great Sakuya	
(c) – refers to the champion(s) heading into the match

=== Inside Out Season ===
Episode No.	Date	Venue	Location	Main Event	Notes
1	May 18, 2026	Shinjuku FACE	Tokyo, Japan	Kaito Kiyomiya vs. Titus Alexander	
2	May 25, 2026	Shinjuku FACE	Tokyo, Japan	Masato Tanaka (c) vs.Hikaru Sato for the GHC Openweight Hardcore Championship	
3	June 8, 2026	Shinjuku FACE	Tokyo, Japan	Kaito Kiyomiya and Titus Alexander vs. Fuminori Abe and Yuya Aoki	
(c) – refers to the champion(s) heading into the match
