= West Coast Pro Tag Team Championship =

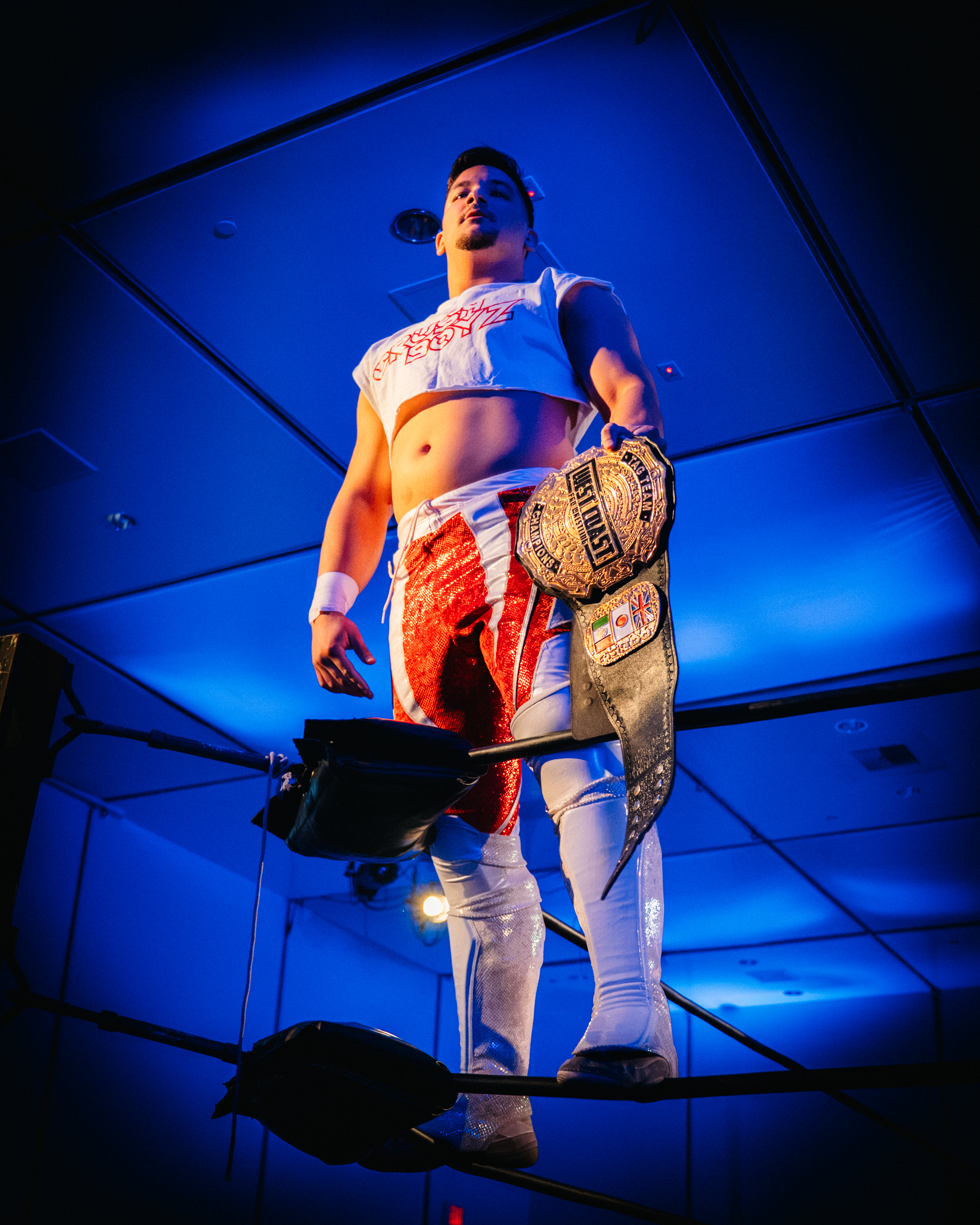
- Titus Alexander with one half of the titles

Details
- Promotion: West Coast Pro Wrestling
- Date established: March 23, 2024
- Current champions: Aaron Solo and Alan Angels
- Date won: March 22, 2026
Statistics
- First champions: Los Suavecitos (Danny Rose and Ricky Gee)
- Most reigns: As a team (2 reigns): Cowboy Way (1 Called Manders and Thomas Shire); As an individual (2 reigns): 1 Called Manders; Thomas Shire
- Longest reign: Cowboy Way (1 Called Manders and Thomas Shire) (239 days)
- Shortest reign: The Crush Boys (Starboy Charlie and Titus Alexander) (188 days)
- Oldest champion: Aaron Solo (39 years, 1 month and 18 days)
- Youngest champion: Starboy Charlie (21 years, 8 months and 6 days)
- Heaviest champion: 1 Called Manders (250 lb (110 kg))
- Lightest champion: Starboy Charlie (154 lb (70 kg))

The West Coast Pro Tag Team Championship is a professional wrestling tag team championship created and promoted by the American promotion West Coast Pro Wrestling. There have been a total of five reigns shared between four different teams consisting of eight distinctive wrestlers. The current champions are Aaron Solo and Alan Angels who are in their first reign as a team as well as individually.

== Title History ==
Key

No.	Overall reign number
Reign	Reign number for the specific champion
Days	Number of days held
+	Current reign is changing daily

No.	Wrestlers	Reign	Date	Days held	Venue	Location	Event	Notes	Ref.
1	Los Suavecitos (Danny Rose and Ricky Gee)	1	March 23, 2024	202	United Irish Cultural Center	San Francisco, California	West Coast Pro Marvelous Coast	Defeated Beef Tank (Beef and Calvin Tankman) to become the inaugural champions. This was a cross-over event held alongside Marvelous That's Women Pro Wrestling	
2	The Crush Boys (Starboy Charlie and Titus Alexander)	1	October 11, 2024	188	United Irish Cultural Center	San Francisco, California	West Coast Pro 6th Anniversary Show		
3	Cowboy Way (1 Called Manders and Thomas Shire)	1	April 17, 2025	100	MEET Las Vegas	Las Vegas, Nevada	Vegas Vacation		
4	The Crush Boys (Starboy Charlie and Titus Alexander)	2	July 26, 2025	239	United Irish Cultural Center	San Francisco, California	DPW/Prestige/West Coast Pro Cruel Summer 2025		
5	Aaron Solo and Alan Angels	1	March 22, 2026	196+	Chase Center	San Francisco, California	PWR/West Coast Pro Lucha Libre Night		

== Combined reigns ==
As of October 4, 2026

=== By team ===
Rank	Team	No. of reigns	Combined days
1	The Crush Boys (Starboy Charlie and Titus Alexander)	2	427
2	Los Suavecitos (Danny Rose and Ricky Gee)	1	202
3	Aaron Solo and Alan Angels †	1	196+
4	Cowboy Way (1 Called Manders and Thomas Shire)	1	100

=== By Wrestler ===
Rank	Wrestler	No. of reigns	Combined days
1	Starboy Charlie	2	427
1	Titus Alexander	2	427
3	Danny Rose	1	202
3	Ricky Gee	1	202
5	Aaron Solo †	1	196+
5	Alan Angels †	1	196+
7	1 Called Manders	1	100
7	Thomas Shire	1	100
