= 1 Called Manders =

American professional wrestler (born 1993)

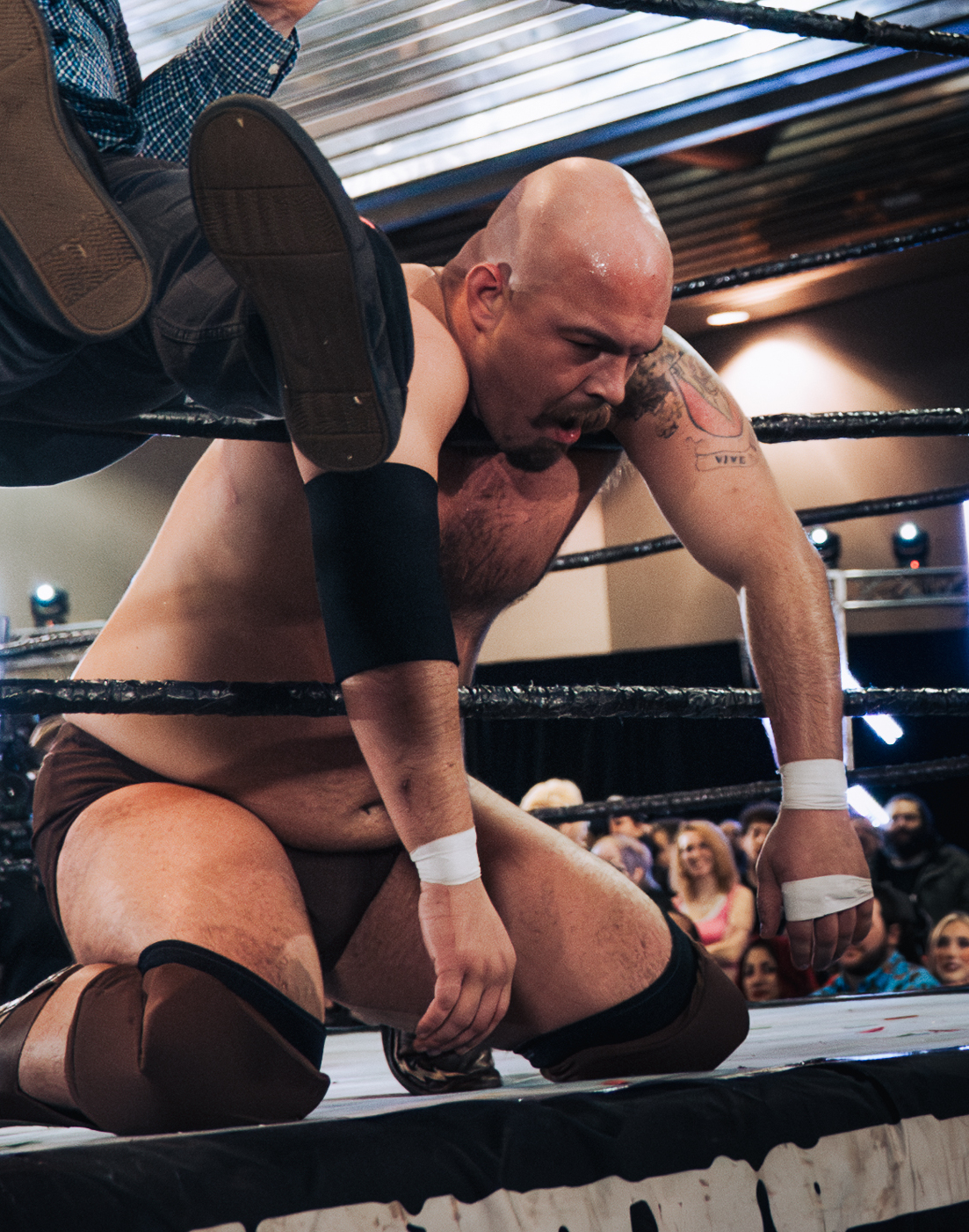
- Manders in April 2024

Personal information
- Born: 23 October 1993 (age 33) Iowa City, Iowa, U.S.

Professional wrestling career
- Ring name: 1 Called Manders Haystack Steve Steve Manders Manders One Called Manders
- Billed height: 185 cm (6 ft 1 in)
- Billed weight: 113 kg (249 lb)
- Trained by: Seth Rollins; Marek Brave
- Debut: 2017

Steven Manders (born 23 October 1993), better known by his ring name 1 Called Manders, is an American professional wrestler. He currently performs as a freelancer.

== Early life ==
Manders grew up playing football, often as a linebacker, and occasionally as a running back and fullback. He attended Archbishop Spalding High School in Severn, Maryland, where he also spent two years on the wrestling team, before deciding to concentrate on football. He transferred to Fork Union Military Academy in Fork Union, Virginia. While there, he met Jim Reid, who was working for the Virginia Cavaliers at the time. After Reid was named the new linebackers coach of the Iowa Hawkeyes, Manders joined the team as a walk-on. He was used as a fullback on the scout team in preparation for the 2014 Outback Bowl, which eventually became his primary position. However, he made limited appearances since he was behind others on the depth chart. In 2016, Manders left the program in order to pursue in a career in professional wrestling.

At Iowa, Manders was known for his love for professional wrestling, something he shared with a number of teammates, including future San Francisco 49ers tight end George Kittle. He was nicknamed "Mankind" by strength and conditioning coach Chris Doyle, a reference to one of the characters that Mick Foley portrayed in the 1990s. After a chance meeting with former Hawkeye Big E, Manders would begin training at the Black and Brave Wrestling Academy, owned by fellow Iowa natives Seth Rollins and Marek Brave.

== Professional wrestling career ==
=== American independent circuit (2017–present) ===
Manders made his professional wrestling debut in SCW Strike II, an event promoted by Scott County Wrestling on April 22, 2017, where he fell short to Joe Acer in singles competition. Among his main field promotions, Manders also shared brief or longer tenures with various other promotions from the American independent scene such as IWA Mid-South, AAW Wrestling, Beyond Wrestling and many others.

=== IWA Mid-South (2017–2020) ===
Manders made his debut in IWA Mid-South at IWA Crowning A Champion 2017 on September 9, an event which hosted a tournament for the vacant IWA Mid-South Heavyweight Championship in which he defeated Dante Leon in singles competition outside of the tournament. He competed in one of the promotion's signature events, the Ted Petty Invitational in which he made his only appearance at the 2020 edition where he fell short to Vincent Nothing in the first rounds.

=== The Wrestling Revolver (2018–present) ===
Manders often works for The Wrestling Revolver, especially in cross-over events promoted alongside various other promotions. At REVOLVER x HOG, a cross-over event promoted by The Wrestling Revolver and House of Glory on April 5, 2022, Manders unsuccessfully challenged Carlos Ramirez for the Crown Jewel Championship. At REVOLVER Cage Of Horrors on July 9, 2022, he unsuccessfully challenged Mike Bailey for the Impact X Division Championship. At REVOLVER Tales From The Ring 5, a cross-over event promoted alongside Impact Wrestling on September 17, 2022, he unsuccessfully challenged Josh Alexander for the Impact World Championship.

=== Game Changer Wrestling (2019–present) ===
Manders made his debut in Game Changer Wrestling at GCW – Lights Out on July 21, 2019, where he competed in a seven-way match won by Shane Mercer and also involving AJ Gray, Alex Zayne, Allie Katch, JJ Garrett and Logan Stunt. He chased for several championships promoted by GCW. At GCW Find You Again on April 22, 2022, he teamed up with Levi Everett to unsuccessfully challenge Bussy (Allie Katch and Effy) for the GCW Tag Team Championship.

He competed in various signature events of the promotion. At GCW Fight Club on October 8, 2022, he teamed up with Mance Warner and Matthew Justice to defeat Wasted Youth (Jimmy Lloyd, Dyln McKay, and Marcus Mathers). In the Joey Janela's Spring Break branch of events, Manders made his debut at GCW Joey Janela's Spring Break 6 on October 18, 2023, where he competed in the traditional Clusterfuck Battle Royal, bout won by The Second Gear Crew stablemates Warner, Justice and AJ Gray, and also involving many other notable opponents such as Billie Starkz, Blake Christian, Dante Leon, Dark Sheik, Joey Janela, Josh Barnett and others. At Joey Janela's Spring Break: Clusterfuck Forever on April 8, 2024, he competed in the same type of match, this time won by Microman and also involving Nick Gage, Mike Bailey, Colin Delaney, Jordan Oliver, Man Like DeReiss, Shane Douglas and others.

=== Major League Wrestling (2023–2024) ===
Manders made his debut in Major League Wrestling at War Chamber 2023 on April 6, where he teamed up with Alexander Hammerstone and "The Second Gear Crew" stablemates Mance Warner and Matthew Justice in a losing effort against The Calling (Rickey Shane Page, Delirious, Akira, and Dr. Cornwallus) in a War Chamber match. At MLW Fusion #172 on April 8, 2023 (broadcast on July 7), where he teamed up with Warner to unsuccessfully challenge The Samoan SWAT Team (Juicy Finau and Lance Anoa'i) for the MLW World Tag Team Championship. At Battle Riot V on April 8, 2023, Manders competed in the traditional 40-man Battle Riot match for a future MLW World Heavyweight Championship match won by Alex Kane and also involving various other notable opponents such as Jesus Rodriguez, Willie Mack, Lince Dorado, Sam Adonis, John Morrison, and many others. At Never Say Never on July 8, 2023, Manders teamed up with Warner to defeat The Calling (Delirious and Dr. Cornwallis) and The Samoan SWAT Team. At Fury Road on September 3, Manders competed twice in two bouts taped for MLW Fusion. In the first one, he teamed up with Justice to defeat The Calling (Cannonball and Talon), and in the second one, he fell short to Matt Cardona. At MLW Slaughterhouse on October 14, 2023, Manders unsuccessfully challenged Page in a Spin the Wheel, Make the Deal: Falls Count Anywhere match for the MLW National Openweight Championship. At Fightland on November 18, 2023, Manders teamed up with Justice and defeated Akira and Page to win the MLW World Tag Team Championship.

At Kings of Colosseum on January 6, 2024, Manders and Justice successfully defended the MLW tag team titles against World Titan Federation (Tom Lawlor and Josh Bishop). At Superfight on February 3, 2024, Manders fell short to Davey Boy Smith Jr. At Intimidation Games on February 29, 2024, Manders and Justice dropped the MLW tag team titles to Smith and Lawlor. At War Chamber on March 29, Manders teamed up with Justice and CozyMax (Shigeo Okumura and Satoshi Kojima) in the traditional War Chamber match. At MLW Azteca Lucha on May 11, 2024, Manders and Justice fell short to CozyMax in a bout for the vacant tag team titles.

=== European independent circuit (2023–present) ===
==== Westside Xtreme Wrestling (2023; 2024-present) ====
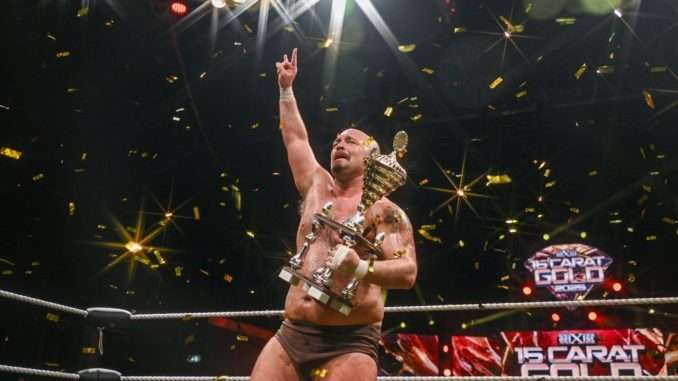
Manders after winning the 2025 16 Carat Gold Tournament.

Manders made his debut in Westside Xtreme Wrestling at the 2023 edition of the wXw World Tag Team Festival where he teamed up with Mance Warner and fell short to Astronauts (Fuminori Abe and Takuya Nomura) in the first rounds. As for the 16 Carat Gold Tournament, he made his first appearance at the 2024 edition of the tournament where he defeated Luke Jacobs in the first rounds, Stephanie Maze in the quarterfinals, then fell short to Laurance Roman in the semifinals.

On April 5, 2025, Maders defeated Elijah Blum at wXw We Love Wrestling: 16 Carat Gold Revenge to win the vacant wXw Unified World Wrestling Championship. On September 27, 2025, Peter Tihanyi defeated Manders for the title at wXw Catch Grand Prix 2025 - Night 3. On July 12, 2026 at Revolution Pro Wrestling Live in Shiefield Event, Manders and his partner Thomas Shire defeated Leon Slater and Liam Slater for the RevPro Tag Team Championship

== Championships and accomplishments ==
- AAW Wrestling
  - AAW Tag Team Championship (1 time) – with Matthew Justice
- ACTION Wrestling
  - ACTION Wrestling Championship (1 time)
  - Futures Showcase Tournament (2019)
- H2O Wrestling
  - H2O Heavyweight Championship (1 time)
  - H2O Tag Team Championship (2 times) – with Ryan Redfield
- Major League Wrestling
  - MLW World Tag Team Championship (1 time) – with Matthew Justice
- New Texas Pro Wrestling
  - NTPW Championship (1 time)
- Pro Wrestling Illustrated
  - Ranked No. 52 of the top 500 singles wrestlers in the PWI 500 in 2025
- Scenic City Invitational
  - Scenic City Invitational Tournament (2023)
- SCW Pro Wrestling
  - SCWPro Iowa Championship (2 times)
  - Best Of Black And Brave Tournament (2019)
- Revolution Pro Wrestling
  - Undisputed British Tag Team Championship (1 time) – with Thomas Shire
- The Wrestling Revolver
  - Revolver World Tag Team Championship (1 time) – with Matthew Justice and Mance Warner
- West Coast Pro Wrestling
  - West Coast Pro Tag Team Championship (1 time) – with Thomas Shire
- Westside Xtreme Wrestling
  - wXw Unified World Wrestling Championship (1 time)
  - 16 Carat Gold Tournament (2025)
