= Noah Wrestle Magic =

2024 Pro Wrestling Noah event

NOAH Wrestle Magic
- Promotional poster
- Promotion: CyberFight
- Brand: Pro Wrestling Noah
- Date: May 4, 2024
- City: Tokyo, Japan
- Venue: Ryogoku Kokugikan
- Attendance: 3,512

Pay-per-view chronology
← Previous; Noah Star Navigation 2024 (Night 3)	Next → All Together 2024

NOAH Wrestle Magic was a professional wrestling event promoted by CyberFight's sub-brand Pro Wrestling Noah and took place on May 4, 2024, in Tokyo, Japan, at the Ryogoku Kokugikan. Broadcasting was on CyberAgent's AbemaTV online linear television service and CyberFight's streaming service Wrestle Universe.

Twelve matches were contested at the event, including one on the pre-show, and five of Noah's six championships were on the line. The main event saw Kaito Kiyomiya defeat El Hijo del Dr. Wagner Jr. to win the GHC Heavyweight Championship. In other prominent matches, Good Looking Guys (Jack Morris and Anthony Greene) successfully retained the GHC Tag Team Championship against Tencozy (Satoshi Kojima and Hiroyoshi Tenzan), and Daga defeated Alejandro to retain the GHC Junior Heavyweight Championship.

== Background ==
=== Storylines ===
The event featured twelve professional wrestling matches that resulted from scripted storylines, where wrestlers portrayed villains, heroes, or less distinguishable characters in the scripted events that built tension and culminated in a wrestling match or series of matches.

=== Event ===
The event started with one preshow bout broadcast on Noah's YouTube channel where Shuji Ishikawa defeated Ninja Mack to win the GHC Openweight Hardcore Championship.

In the first main card bout, Titus Alexander and Starboy Charlie defeated Ryohei Oiwa and Daiki Inaba in tag team competition. Next up, Masa Kitamiya defeated Takashi Sugiura in singles competition. The fourth match saw the team of the GHC National Champion Hayata, Eita and Akira picking a victory over Junta Miyawaki, Yu Owada and a returning Hitoshi Kumano in six-man tag team action. In the fifth match, Tadasuke and Yo-Hey defeated Dragón Bane and Alpha Wolf, and Shuji Kondo and "brother" Yasshi to secure the fifth consecutive defense of the GHC Junior Heavyweight Tag Team Championship in that respective reign. Next up, Kenoh defeated Yamato in an open challenge singles bout. In the seventh bout, Ulka Sasaki and Kazushi Sakuraba defeated Shuhei Taniguchi and Hikaru Sato in an UWF rules tag team match. Next up, Dream Star Fighting Marigold representatives Giulia, Utami Hayashishita, Mirai and Mai Sakurai defeated the team of Nagisa Nozaki, Great Sakuya, Miyuki Takase and Takumi Iroha after previously invading Noah and issuing a challenge. In the eighth bout, Jake Lee and Tajiri defeated Naomichi Marufuji and Hajime Ohara in tag team competition. In the tenth bout, Daga defeated Alejandro to secure the sixth consecutive defense of the GHC Junior Heavyweight Championship in that respective reign. In the semi main event, Jack Morris and Anthony Greene defeated NJPW veterans Satoshi Kojima and Hiroyoshi Tenzan to secure the eighth consecutive defense of the GHC Tag Team Championship in that respective reign.

In the main event, Kaito Kiyomiya defeated El Hijo de Dr. Wagner Jr. to win the GHC Heavyweight Championship, ending the latter's reign at 90 days and one defense. After the bout concluded, Kenoh laid a challenge to Kiyomiya backstage.

== Results ==
No.	Results	Stipulations	Times
1^{P}	Shuji Ishikawa defeated Ninja Mack (c) by pinfall	Hardcore match for the GHC Openweight Hardcore Championship	10:05
2	Titus Alexander and Starboy Charlie defeated Ryohei Oiwa and Daiki Inaba by pinfall	Tag team match	6:35
3	Masa Kitamiya defeated Takashi Sugiura by pinfall	Singles match	9:57
4	Hayata, Eita and Akira defeated Junta Miyawaki, Hitoshi Kumano and Yu Owada by pinfall	Six-man tag team match	9:24
5	Good Looking Guys (Tadasuke and Yo-Hey) (c) defeated Los Golpeadores (Dragón Bane and Alpha Wolf) and Aagan Iisou (Shuji Kondo and "Brother" Yasshi) by pinfall	Survival Three-way tag elimination match for the GHC Junior Heavyweight Tag Team Championship	12:43
6	Kenoh defeated Yamato by pinfall	Singles match	15:50
7	Ulka Sasaki and Kazushi Sakuraba defeated Shuhei Taniguchi and Hikaru Sato by pinfall	UWF Rules tag team match	11:13
8	Marigold (Giulia, Utami Hayashishita, Mirai and Mai Sakurai) defeated Nagisa Nozaki, Great Sakuya, Miyuki Takase and Takumi Iroha by pinfall	Eight-woman tag team match	18:17
9	Jake Lee and Tajiri defeated Naomichi Marufuji and Hajime Ohara by pinfall	Tag team match	10:40
10	Daga (c) defeated Alejandro by pinfall	Singles match for the GHC Junior Heavyweight Championship	11:39
11	Good Looking Guys (Jack Morris and Anthony Greene) (c) defeated Tencozy (Satoshi Kojima and Hiroyoshi Tenzan) by pinfall	Tag Team match for the GHC Tag Team Championship	14:05
12	Kaito Kiyomiya defeated El Hijo del Dr. Wagner Jr. (c) by pinfall	Singles match for the GHC Heavyweight Championship	24:45
(c) / – the champion(s) heading into the match; P / – the match was broadcast on the pre-show
