= ICW Fight Club =

British professional wrestling television programme

- Also known as: ICW Friday Night Fight Club (2015–2016)
- Genre: Professional wrestling
- Presented by: Billy Kirkwood; James R. Kennedy
- Starring: ICW roster
- Country of origin: United Kingdom
- Original language: English
- No. of episodes: 140

Production
- Camera setup: Multicamera setup
- Running time: 45–90 minutes
- Production company: Insane Championship Wrestling

Original release
- Network: ICW On Demand
- Release: February 20, 2015 – March 20, 2020
- Network: WWE Network; Peacock
- Release: November 28, 2020 – January 17, 2023
- Network: YouTube; Facebook
- Release: January 17 – February 27, 2023
- Network: FITE TV
- Release: March 3 – December 17, 2023

ICW Fight Club, formerly known as ICW Friday Night Fight Club, is a British professional wrestling streaming television programme produced by Insane Championship Wrestling which aired from February 20, 2015 to December 17, 2023.

== History ==
On February 15, 2015, ICW taped the first two episodes of Friday Night Fight Club in Dundee, Scotland. The show premiered on February 20, 2015 on ICW On Demand with the main event match being between Joe Hendry and Mikey Whiplash. In May 2016, the show was renamed to Fight Club beginning with the tapings for the June 3, 2016 and June 10, 2016 episodes which were taped in Glasgow.

On July 29, 2016 and July 30, 2016, ICW held their first specials for Fight Club with the Shug's Weekender Definitely Maybe and Seven Nation Army events at the O_{2} Ritz in Manchester, England and the O_{2} Institute in Birmingham, England respectively. Both events also featured matches for a tournament to crown the new ICW Tag Team Champions.

Due to the COVID-19 pandemic, several Fight Club tapings were postponed and resulted in the show going on hiatus. On November 28, 2020 ICW announced that new episodes of Fight Club would be airing on the WWE Network. On March 20, 2023, ICW aired a special episode of Fight Club titled Barred, a special event in which every match on the card took place inside a steel cage. During this event, the ICW Tag Team Championship changed hands when The Nine9 (Dickie Divers and Jack Morris) defeated Krieger and Lou King Sharp.

In January 2023, ICW announced that due to their contract with WWE ending, their content would be removed from Peacock and the WWE Network. On February 27, 2023, ICW announced that they would be airing Fight Club and all of their events on FITE TV.

On October 7, 2023, ICW held tapings for Fight Club at the Royal Highland Centre in Edinburgh, Scotland as part of Comic Con Scotland.

On November 13, 2023, ICW announced that they would be ending Fight Club after 8 years of being on the air with a final live broadcast on FITE TV taking place on December 17, 2023 at the Asylum in Glasgow.
