= List of professional wrestling streaming services =

This is a list of over-the-top streaming services owned and operated by professional wrestling promotions.

== Active ==
Name	Owner (Parent company)	URL	Launched
3CW On Demand	3 Count Wrestling		November 19, 2016
4FW On Demand	4 Front Wrestling		
AAW Pro Wrestling OnDemand	AAW: Professional Wrestling Redefined		
All Japan Pro Wrestling TV	All Japan Pro Wrestling (Zen Nihon Puroresu Innovation)		March 19, 2018
Australian Wrestling Network	Explosive Pro Wrestling and Melbourne City Wrestling		
AWW On Demand	Alternative Wrestling World		December 29, 2018
Bar Wrestling – Get Drunk, Watch Wrestling	Joey Ryan		
Big Japan Pro Wrestling Core	Big Japan Pro Wrestling		
APW On Demand	Academy Pro Wrestling		January 6, 2019
BWP On Demand	Britannia Wrestling Promotions		June 17, 2016
Chaos On Demand	Pro Wrestling Chaos		November 11, 2014
Club WWN	WWNLive		November 2016
CZW Studios	Combat Zone Wrestling		2016
Demand Progress	Progress Wrestling		2018
Dragon Gate Network	Dragon Gate		
ECCW On Demand	Elite Canadian Championship Wrestling		
ECWA Pro Wrestling	East Coast Wrestling Association		
EVE On Demand	Pro-Wrestling: EVE		
Triller TV	Triller		2012
Highspots Wrestling Network	Highspots		
Hoodslammery	Hoodslam		2015
Honor Club	Ring of Honor (ROH Acquisition Co., LLC)		February 19, 2018
IndependentWrestling.tv	Beyond Wrestling and partners		2019
ICW On Demand	Insane Championship Wrestling		
IWPL On Demand	International Pro Wrestling: United Kingdom and World Wrestling League		
KC Vault	Kayfabe Commentaries		August 14, 2018
MCW Encore	Melbourne City Wrestling		2014
MCW Rage TV	MCW Pro Wrestling (MSDM, Inc)		
MyAEW	All Elite Wrestling		March 9, 2026
Monster Factory Pro Wrestling	Monster Factory		
New Japan Pro-Wrestling World	New Japan Pro-Wrestling (New Japan Pro-Wrestling Co., Ltd. and TV Asahi Corporation)		December 1, 2014
NGW Unlimited	New Genesis Wrestling		January 17, 2026
Nico Pro	DWANGO Co.		
OTT On Demand	Over the Top Wrestling		
OVW Wrestling Network	Ohio Valley Wrestling (Gladiator Sports Network)		
Premier Pro Wrestling Live	Premier Pro Wrestling		
Premier Streaming Network	Freddie Prinze Jr. and partners		November, 2022
PW4U On Demand	Pro Wrestling 4 U		November 15, 2017
Reach On Demand	Reach Wrestling		January 1, 2019
RF Video Vault	RF Video		
RPW On Demand	Revolution Pro Wrestling		2018
SWA On Demand	Shropshire Wrestling Alliance		February 5, 2017
Stardom World	World Wonder Ring Stardom (Kabushiki Gaisha Stardom)		February 28, 2016 (as a YouTube subscription service); July 4, 2016 (as a stand-alone streaming serivice)
TCW On Demand	Tasmanian Championship Wrestling		March 25, 2020
TNA+	Total Nonstop Action Wrestling (Anthem Sports & Entertainment)		May 1, 2019
UKWA VOD	UK Wrestling Alliance	&	
Wave Network	Pro Wrestling Wave		
WAW/Bellatrix On Demand	World Association of Wrestling and Bellatrix Female Warriors		June 17, 2020
Women's Wrestling Network	Highspots and partners		
Wrestle Universe	CyberFight (CyberAgent)		May 12, 2020
WSW On Demand	World Series Wrestling		
WWE Network	WWE (World Wrestling Entertainment, Inc.)		February 24, 2014
wXwNOW	Westside Xtreme Wrestling (wXw Europe GmbH)		2016
WXW Wrestling Network	World Xtreme Wrestling		

== Defunct ==
Name	Owner (Parent company)	Launched/Defunct	Fate
beyondemand	Beyond Wrestling		Replaced with Powerbomb.tv
Chikaratopia	Mike Quackenbush	2015 – 2020	
DDT Universe	DDT Pro-Wrestling (CyberFight)	January 23, 2017 – May 12, 2020	Replaced with Wrestle Universe
FloSlam	FloSports	October 2016 – November 29, 2017	Ceased operations
Global Wrestling Network	Impact Wrestling (Anthem Wrestling Exhibitions)	October 10, 2017 – May 1, 2019	Replaced with Impact Plus
NWA All Access	National Wrestling Alliance and FITE (Lightning One, Inc. and Triller)	January 5, 2022 – January 3, 2023	Ceased operations
NWA Classics 24/7	National Wrestling Alliance (International Wrestling Corp, LLC)	2015 – 2017	Ceased operations
Psychopathic Live	Psychopathic Records	2011 – 2013	Ceased operations
Powerbomb.tv	Beyond Wrestling and partners	2016 – 2019	Replaced with Independent Wrestling TV
Southside Wrestling On-Demand	Southside Wrestling Entertainment		Ceased operations after Southside Wrestling Entertainment closed

== See also ==
- List of professional wrestling websites
- List of professional wrestling television series
