= West Coast Pro Golden Gate Championship =

Details
- Promotion: West Coast Pro Wrestling
- Date established: April 4, 2025
- Current champion: Andrew Cass
- Date won: February 27, 2026
Statistics
- First champion: Bret the Threat
- Most reigns: Andrew Cass (2 reigns)
- Longest reign: Bret the Threat (113 days)
- Shortest reign: Alan Angels (54 days)
- Oldest champion: Alpha Zo (31 years, 188 days)
- Heaviest champion: Alpha Zo (216 lb (98 kg))
- Lightest champion: Alan Angels (169 lb (77 kg))

The West Coast Pro Golden Gate Championship is a professional wrestling championship created and promoted by the American promotion West Coast Pro Wrestling, being sanctioned as the promotion's secondary singles championship. There have been a total of five reigns and one vacancy shared among four different champions. The current titleholder is Andrew Cass who is in his first reign.

== Reigns ==
Key
No.	Overall reign number
Reign	Reign number for the specific champion
Days	Number of days held

No.	Champion	Championship change			Reign statistics		Notes	Ref.
No.	Champion	Date	Event	Location	Reign	Days	Notes	Ref.
1	Bret the Threat	April 4, 2025	Battle of the Bay	Newark, CA	1	113	This was co-produced by Big Time Wrestling.	
—	Vacated	July 26, 2025	Battle of the Bay	Newark, CA	—	—	The title was vacated because previous champion Bret The Threat stopped defending it.	
2	Alpha Zo	July 26, 2025	Cruel Summer	San Francisco, CA	1	98	This was co-produced by Prestige Wrestling and Deadlock Pro-Wrestling. Zo defeated Adrian Quest, Danny Orion, Jordan Cruz, Manny Lo, and Ryan Clancy in a gauntlet match to win the vacant title. The bout was initially billed as a number one "Golden Gate Gauntlet" match. However, Zo was billed as champion in his next title defense at the "God Called In Sick Today" event on September 5, 2025.	
3	Andrew Cass	November 1, 2025	How the West Was Won	San Francisco, CA	1	64		
4	Alan Angels	January 4, 2026	Operation Stackola	Oakland, CA	1	54		
5	Andrew Cass	February 27, 2026	Evil Empire	Commerce, CA	2	180+	This three-way match also featured G. Sharpe.	

== Combined reigns ==
As of August 26, 2026.

†	Indicates the current champion

Rank	Wrestler	No. of reigns	Combined days
1	Andrew Cass †	2	244+
2	Bret the Threat	1	113
3	Alpha Zo	1	98
4	Alan Angels	1	54
