= XPW TV =

- Also known as: XPW Monday Nightmare
- Genre: Professional wrestling
- Created by: Rob Zicari
- Starring: XPW roster
- Country of origin: United States
- Original language: English
- No. of episodes: 193

Production
- Producer: Rob Zicari
- Camera setup: Multicamera setup
- Production company: Xtreme Pro Wrestling

Original release
- Network: Syndication
- Release: April 8, 2000 – March 24, 2003
- Network: America One
- Release: May 2000 – July 2000
- Network: FITE TV
- Release: November 3, 2021 – October 11, 2022
- Network: YouTube
- Release: October 31, 2021 – September 7, 2024
- Network: StreamXPW; YouTube
- Release: February 16, 2023 – September 7, 2024

XPW TV is an American professional wrestling streaming television program produced by Xtreme Pro Wrestling (XPW). The show originally aired from April 8, 2000 to March 24, 2003 on syndication and from October 31, 2021 to September 7, 2024 on FITE TV, StreamXPW, and YouTube.

== History ==
XPW TV first aired on April 8, 2000 on KDOC-TV in the Los Angeles market which featured footage from TV tapings from September 24, 1999 and September 25, 1999 at the Reseda Country Club in Reseda, California. Overtime, the program would air in syndication in several markets.

In August 2001, after leaving XPW, William Welch, known by his ring name Messiah, was written out of the company in a storyline in which his character ascended to heaven. According to Welch, he had been threatened by Rob Zicari, the owner of XPW after rumors of Welch and Zicari's wife Lizzy Borden getting into an affair with each other had surfaced.

On August 31, 2002, XPW relocated to Philadelphia, Pennsylvania and began holding shows at the Viking Hall. Following the relocation to Philadelphia, XPW TV would be rebranded to XPW Monday Nightmare, with the television series airing on Mondays instead of its original Saturday night timeslot with its primary station being WBGN-TV.

In November 2002, Kris Kloss was removed from his position as commentator for XPW TV and replaced with former ECW commentator Joey Styles. Styles, however, left the company in December 2002, only spending about one month in the promotion. From 2007 to 2008, the first three seasons of XPW TV were released on DVD by Big Vision Entertainment.

On February 23, 2002, New Jack and Vic Grimes fought each other in a scaffold match at XPW's Freefall event. As the final maneuver of the match, New Jack shocked Grimes with a taser before throwing him from the scaffold and sending him crashing to the ring 40 feet below; there were over twelve tables stacked on top of each other in the ring to break the fall, of which Grimes missed all but two and came within a foot of missing the ring completely, which could have killed him. Grimes broke his fall on the top rope, dislocating his ankle among other injuries. This was done, according to Jack, over a grudge based on Grimes not contacting him when he was recovering from his injuries after their fall in Danbury. However, Art O'Donnell, a writer for WrestleCrap, disputes this, citing Jack's apparent concern for Grimes' safety in a previous match for XPW and how intentional the spot seemed. Highlights from this match aired on the 84th episode of XPW TV.

On October 21, 2021, Vice TV aired an episode of their documentary series Dark Side of the Ring in which the topic was XPW. Footage from the XPW TV program was also used in the episode and also featured wrestlers like New Jack, Messiah, Shane Douglas, and Luke Hawx along with Lizzy Borden.

In August 2021, XPW announced their return with its first show taking place on November 7, 2021 as a pay-per-view event titled on FITE TV titled Rebirth. In addition to the announcement, XPW announced that XPW TV would make its return with the first episode airing on November 3, 2021 on the service and on October 31, 2022 on YouTube. Following the end of XPW's partnership with FITE TV in 2022, XPW TV moved to Stream XPW, XPW's own streaming service.
