= Aaron Solo =

American wrestler (born 1987)

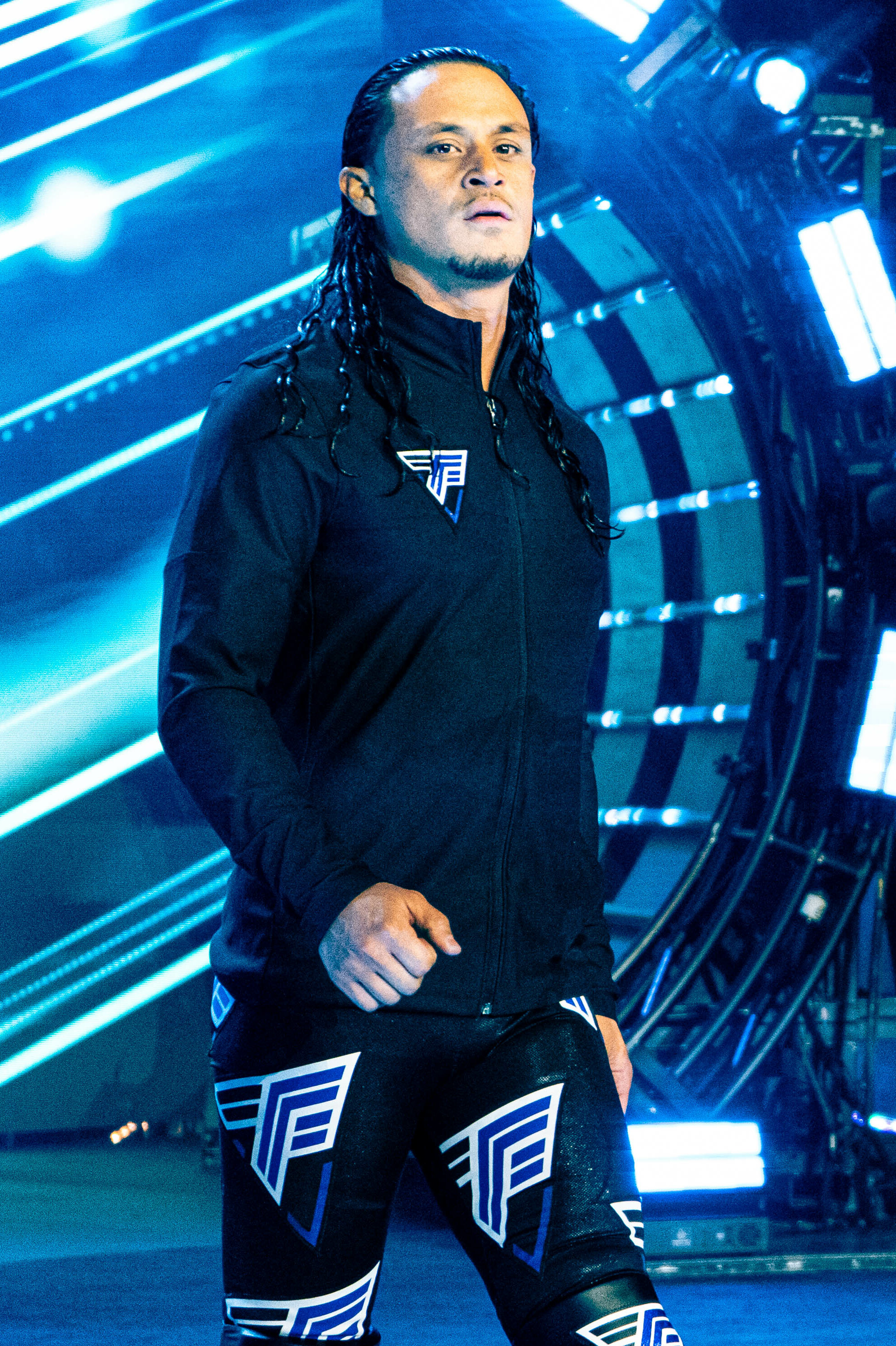
- Solo in 2022

Personal information
- Born: Aaron Solow; February 4, 1987 (age 39) San Francisco, California, U.S.
- Education: El Camino High School
- Life partner: Bayley (2016–2021)

Professional wrestling career
- Ring name(s): Aaron Solow; Aaron Solo
- Billed height: 5 ft 11 in (180 cm)
- Billed weight: 187 lb (85 kg)
- Trained by: Lance Storm; Davey Richards; Tony Kozina
- Debut: 2009

Aaron Solow (born February 4, 1987) is an American professional wrestler. He is signed to the American promotion All Elite Wrestling (AEW), where he performs under the ring name Aaron Solo. He also making sporadic appearances on the independent circuit.

== Professional wrestling career ==
Solo made his debut on the independent circuit in California, notably Big Time Wrestling. On July 16, 2015 he wrestled Tyler Breeze at WWE NXT. In 2018 he wrestled Punishment Martinez for the ROH World Television Championship.

He made his AEW debut on July 15, 2020, losing to Scorpio Sky on AEW Dark. He was initially aligned with The Nightmare Family but later joined QT Marshall and The Factory, turning heel in the process. He made his AEW Dynamite debut, teaming with Nick Comoroto & QT Marshall defeating The Nightmare Family (Billy Gunn, Dustin Rhodes and Lee Johnson).

At AEW Double Or Nothing, he participated in the Casino Battle Royal. On August 10, 2022 he was defeated by his former partner Ricky Starks at Quake by the Lake.

== Personal life ==
Solow is of Filipino descent, and in 2011 was a founding member of the independent Pinoy Boyz tag-team. He was born in San Francisco, and grew up in South San Francisco. He is a 2005 graduate of El Camino High School. In 2016, Solow announced his engagement to fellow professional wrestler Pamela Martinez (best known as Bayley), having met in 2010. The engagement was called off on February 21, 2021.

== Championships and Accomplishments ==
- American Combat Wrestling
  - ACW Tag Team Championship (3 times) – with Jason Cade
- Big Time Wrestling
  - BTW Heavyweight Championship (1 time, current)
  - BTW Tag Team Championship (1 time) – with Shane Kody
- West Coast Pro Wrestling
  - West Coast Pro Tag Team Championship (1 time, current) – with Alan Angels
- Dojo Pro Wrestling
  - Dojo Pro Black Belt Championship (1 time)
  - Dojo Pro White Belt Championship (1 time)
- Pro Wrestling Illustrated
  - Ranked No. 399 of the top 500 singles wrestlers in the PWI 500 in 2026
- WrestleCircus
  - WC Big Top Tag Team Championship (1 time) – with Ricky Starks
