= NWA All Access =

Professional wrestling streaming package

- Screenshot
- Area served: Worldwide
- Website: N/A
- Registration: Required
- Launched: January 5, 2022; 4 years ago
- Current status: Defunct

NWA All Access was a professional wrestling streaming package offered by the National Wrestling Alliance (NWA) distributed by FITE TV. Launched in January 2022, as part an expanded partnership between the NWA and FITE, All Access includes past and upcoming pay-per-view events, premiere episodes of NWA Power, and the Lightning One-era library of NWA television and documentary series. As of the January 3, 2023 the NWA started to phase out the All Access streaming service on FITE with the return of weekly airings of NWA Powerrr to YouTube on Tuesday nights.

== Programming ==
- All NWA pay-per-view events.
- Premiere episodes NWA Powerrr, the promotion's flagship show.
- All episodes of NWA television series, including NWA USA.
- Ten Pounds of Gold, a documentary series chronicling the journey and career of the current NWA Worlds Heavyweight Champion as well as others in the division.

== See also ==
- List of professional wrestling streaming services
