= Alan Angels =

American professional wrestler (born 1998)

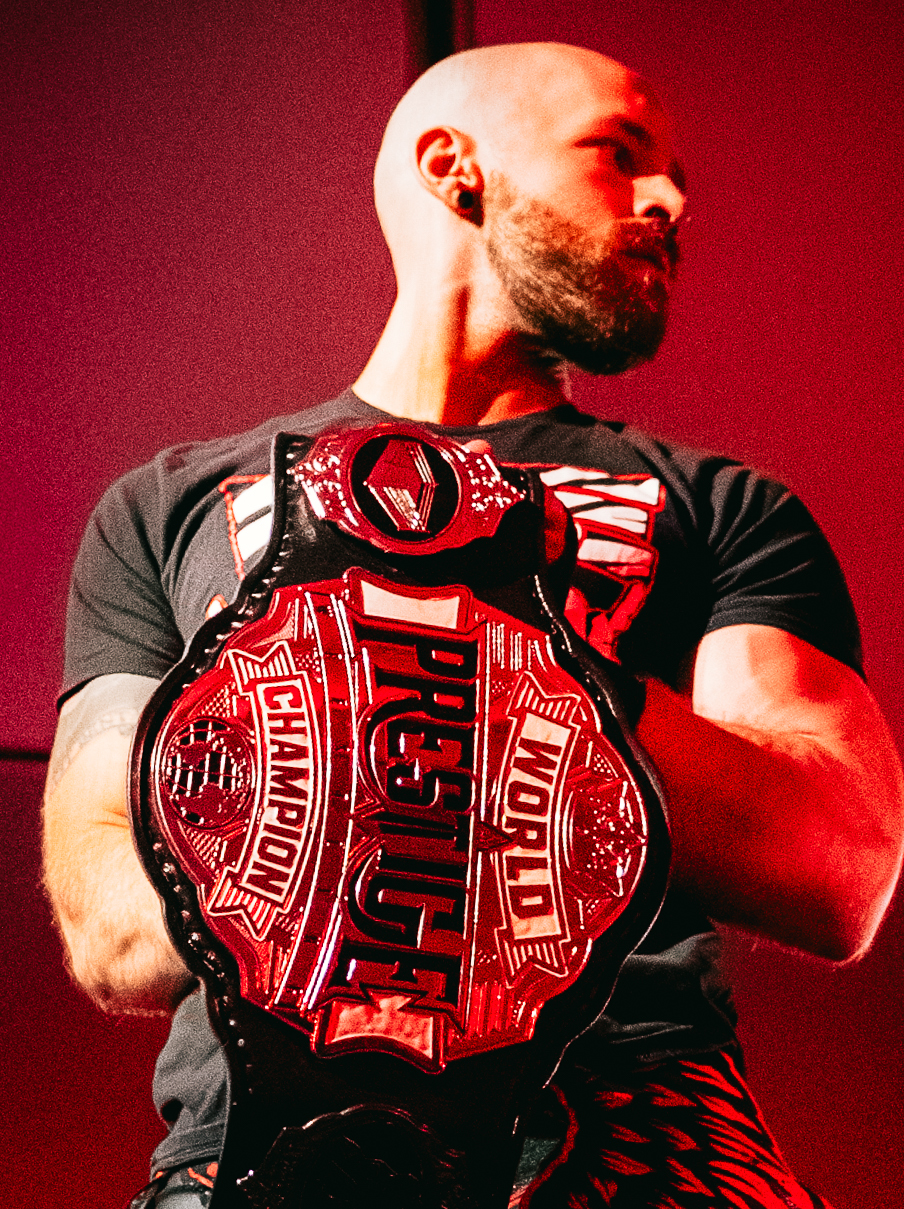
- Angels as the Prestige Championship in April 2025

Personal information
- Born: Trey Tucker; February 16, 1998 (age 28) Snellville, Georgia, U.S.

Professional wrestling career
- Ring names: Alan Angels; Angels; Five
- Billed height: 5 ft 8 in (173 cm)
- Billed weight: 169 lb (77 kg)
- Trained by: AR Fox
- Debut: November 4, 2016

Trey Tucker (born February 16, 1998), better known by the ring name Alan Angels, is an American professional wrestler. He performs on independent circuit. He is known for his work in All Elite Wrestling (AEW), where as a former member of The Dark Order and in Total Nonstop Action Wrestling (TNA) as a former member of The Design.

== Professional wrestling career ==
=== Early career (2016–2020) ===
Tucker was trained to wrestle by AR Fox. He debuted on November 4, 2016 using the ring name "Alan Angels".

=== All Elite Wrestling (2020–2022, 2026) ===
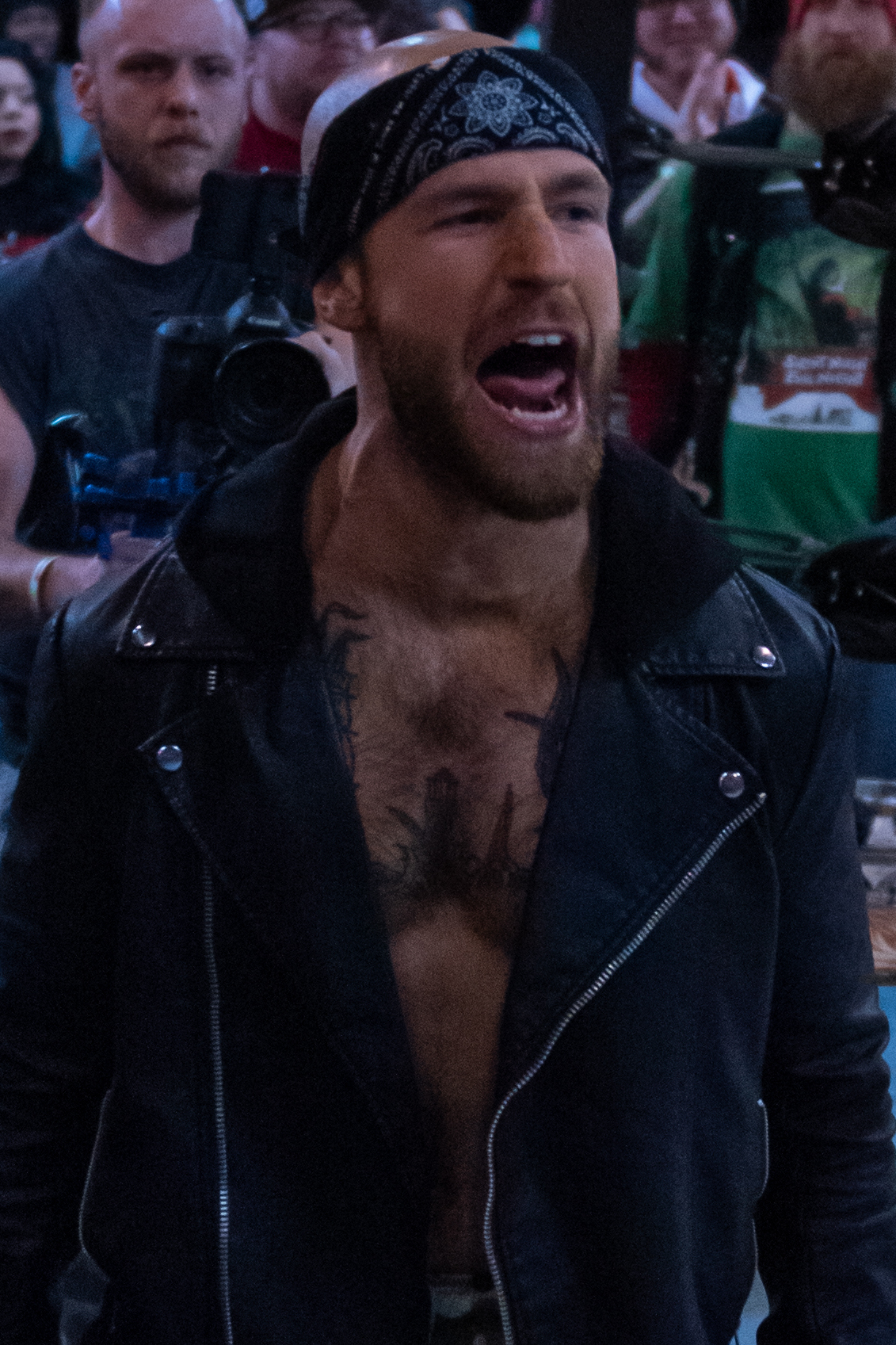
Angels in December 2019

On the April 8, 2020, episode of AEW Dynamite, Angels made his AEW debut losing to Lance Archer. On the April 22, 2020 edition of Dynamite, Angels faced off against Kenny Omega in a losing effort. On June 5, it was revealed that Angels had been recruited as a new member of the Dark Order under the moniker of 5. He later debuted on the June 9, 2020 episode of AEW Dark, winning his first match against Lee Johnson.

Over the summer of 2021, The Dark Order faced a bit of a divide, due to the leadership of Evil Uno. This led to Angels challenging Uno to a match on the September 7 edition of Dark, which Uno won. After being unmasked, Angels began wrestling without his mask. On the November 7, 2021 edition of Dynamite, Angels once again faced Omega, who was the AEW World Champion, in a losing effort.

On the July 16 edition of Dark (taped June 11), Angels lost to Daniel Garcia in a pure rules match, which ended up being his final match for the company. Angels remained with the Dark Order and AEW until June 29, 2022, when he left the promotion upon the expiration of his contract.

Angels returned to AEW on the June 6, 2026 edition of Collision, in a losing effort to Shane Taylor.

=== Impact Wrestling / Total Nonstop Action Wrestling (2022–2025, 2026) ===
On the November 3, 2022, episode of Impact!, Angels, alongside Kon joined the stable Violent by Design, which already consisted of Eric Young and Deaner. On the December 8 episode of Impact!, following the "death" of Eric Young (in reality, he departed the company upon the expiry of his contract), the group was renamed The Design, and Angels began going under the mononym of his in-ring surname.

On the July 6, 2023, episode of Impact!, Angels lost to Jonathan Gresham. He then shook hands with Gresham against Deaner's orders and left the Design. Since then, his ring name has been reverted back to Alan Angels.

At Impact 1000, Angels won an Ultimate X match to become the number #1 contender for the Impact X Division Championship. Angels received his title opportunity two weeks later, where he lost to Chris Sabin.

At No Surrender, Angels returned to TNA where he lost to Frankie Kazarian on the Countdown preshow.

=== MLW Fusion (2026) ===
On the July 18 episode of MLW Fusion, Angels competed in a four-way match for the MLW World Middleweight Championship: Champion: KUSHIDA Challengers: Templario (CMLL), Taiji Ishimori (NJPW), and Alan Angels. Alan Angels held his own against the international stars, connecting with a Northern Lights Suplex, a moonsault to the floor, and a frog splash that nearly won him the championship. KUSHIDA finally secured the victory by rolling up Alan Angels and pinning him clean to retain the title after approximately 8 minutes and 43 seconds.

== Championships and accomplishments ==
- Georgia Premier Wrestling
  - GPW Tag Team Championship (2 times) – with Lee Johnson
- Garden State Pro Wrestling
  - Garden State PW Openweight Championship (1 time)
  - Garden State PW Openweight Championship Tournament (2022)
- Prestige Wrestling
  - Prestige Championship (2 times)
- Pro Wrestling Junkie
  - PWJ Massacre Championship (1 time)
- Pro Wrestling Illustrated
  - Ranked No. 163 of the top 500 singles wrestlers in the PWI 500 in 2024
- Relentless Wrestling
  - Relentless Pacific Northwest Championship (1 time)
- Southern Fried Championship Wrestling
  - SFCW Classic Championship (1 time)
- Southern Honor Wrestling
  - SHW Championship (1 time)
- The Wrestling Revolver
  - Revolver World Tag Team Championship (1 time) – with Krule and Dreadknot
- West Coast Pro Wrestling
  - West Coast Pro Golden Gate Championship (1 time)
  - West Coast Pro Tag Team Championship (1 time, current) – with Aaron Solo
- World Wrestling Alliance 4
  - WWA4 Tag Team Championship (1 time) – with Tommy Maserati
