= West Coast Pro Heavyweight Championship =

Men's professional wrestling world championship

Details
- Promotion: West Coast Pro Wrestling
- Date established: March 1, 2019
- Current champion: Adam Priest
- Date won: June 20, 2026
Statistics
- First champion: Alexander Hammerstone
- Most reigns: Titus Alexander and Kevin Blackwood (2 reigns)
- Longest reign: Alexander Hammerstone (924 days)
- Shortest reign: Titus Alexander (60 days)
- Oldest champion: Vinnie Massaro (47 years, 1 month and 13 days)
- Youngest champion: Starboy Charlie (20 years, 8 months and 9 days)
- Heaviest champion: Jacob Fatu (279 lb (127 kg))
- Lightest champion: Starboy Charlie (154 lb (70 kg))

The West Coast Pro Heavyweight Championship is a men's professional wrestling world championship created and promoted by the American promotion West Coast Pro Wrestling, being sanctioned as the promotion's top championship. There have been a total of nine reigns shared among seven different champions. The current titleholder is Adam Priest who is in his first reign.

== Title history ==
Key
No.	Overall reign number
Reign	Reign number for the specific champion
Days	Number of days held
+	Current reign is changing daily

No.	Champion	Championship change			Reign statistics		Notes	Ref.
No.	Champion	Date	Event	Location	Reign	Days	Notes	Ref.
1	Alexander Hammerstone	March 1, 2019	When The Smoke Clears	San Francisco, California	1	924	Defeated Tyler Bateman in a tournament final to become the inaugural champion.	
2	AJ Gray	September 10, 2021	I Hate You With A Passion	San Francisco, California	1	182		
3	Jacob Fatu	March 11, 2022	Prestige/West Coast Pro Savage Mode	San Francisco, California	1	211	This was a cross-over event held alongside Prestige Wrestling.	
4	Titus Alexander	October 8, 2022	Ride The Lightning - The 4 Year Anniversary Show	San Francisco, California	1	371		
5	Starboy Charlie	October 14, 2023	West Coast Pro 5	San Francisco, California	1	161		
6	Kevin Blackwood	March 23, 2024	Marvelous Coast	San Francisco, California	1	233		
7	Titus Alexander	November 11, 2024	Monday Magic Autumn Vol. 3	Tokyo, Japan	2	60	This was a Pro Wrestling Noah event.	
8	Kevin Blackwood	January 10, 2025	Only The Strong Survive	San Francisco, California	2	295		
9	Vinnie Massaro	November 1, 2025	How The West Was Won	San Francisco, California	1	231		
10	Adam Priest	June 20, 2026	Cruel Summer 2026	San Francisco, California	1	143+		

== Combined reigns ==
As of November 10, 2026.

†	Indicates the current champion

Rank	Wrestler	No. of reigns	Combined days
1	Alex Hammerstone	1	924
2	Kevin Blackwood	2	528
3	Titus Alexander	2	431
4	Vinnie Massaro	1	231
5	Jacob Fatu	1	211
6	AJ Gray	1	182
7	Starboy Charlie	1	161
8	Adam Priest †	1	143+
