= West Coast Pro Wrestling =

American independent professional wrestling promotion

- Trade name: West Coast Pro
- Type: Private
- Industry: Professional wrestling
- Founded: October 2018; 8 years ago
- Founders: Scott Bregante
- Headquarters: Pacifica, California, U.S.
- Key people: Vinnie Massaro (Promoter); Chris Hero (Head of Creative)
- Owners: Scott Bregante
- Website: www.westcoastprowrestling.com

West Coast Pro Wrestling (West Coast Pro) often referred to simply as West Coast Pro, is an American independent professional wrestling promotion based in Pacifica, California, owned and founded by Scott Bregante in 2018.

== History ==
=== Formation and activity ===
Owner and founder of the promotion Scott Bregante announced at the beginning of October 2018 the launch of the promotion with its headquarters being established in Pacifica, California. The promotion held its inaugural event, the Chapter One: Halloween, on October 13, 2018, at The Gold Mine training center. The name of the promotion is derived from the geographic position of the headquarters hometown which is in the Bay Area, thus part from the West Coast of the United States itself.

West Coast Pro currently has four different active championships. On March 1, 2019, the promotion held an eight-person tournament to crown the inaugural West Coast Pro Heavyweight Champion, won by Alexander Hammerstone and also involving Tyler Bateman, Marcus Lewis, Steven Tresario, Dave Dutra, Will Hobbs, Johnny Dynamo and Levi Shapiro. At West Coast Pro Marvelous Coast on March 23, 2024, Los Suavecitos (Danny Rose and Ricky Gee) defeated Beef Tank (Beef and Calvin Tankman) to become the inaugural West Coast Pro Tag Team Champions. On April 4, 2025, at BTW/West Coast Pro Battle Of The Bay, a cross-over event between West Coast Pro and Big Time Wrestling, Bret The Threat defeated Jiah Jewell to become the inaugural West Coast Pro Golden Gate Champion.

=== Partnerships ===
In March 2023, Chris Hero returned to professional wrestling as the promotion's "match maker", thus cementing his position as the head of the creative team. The promotion began acting as an important scouting space for WWE's young talent program of WWE ID since mid-2023. Several of the promotion's natives scouted by the program were Johnnie Robbie and Starboy Charlie. Other native talent of the promotion such as Powerhouse Hobbs, Titus Alexander and Jacob Fatu have been featured at All Elite Wrestling (AEW), Total Nonstop Action (TNA) and in Japan.

On March 29, 2024, Deadlock Pro-Wrestling (DPW) announced that they had entered into a strategic partnership with West Coast Pro and Prestige Wrestling. Most of the pay-per-view events are available on Wrestle Universe.

== Championships and accomplishments ==
Championship	Current champion(s)	Reign	Date won	Days held	Location	Notes	Ref.
West Coast Pro Heavyweight Championship	Vinnie Massaro	1	November 1, 2025	379+	San Francisco, CA	Defeated Kevin Blackwood in a title vs. career match at West Coast Pro How The West Was Won.	
West Coast Pro Golden Gate Championship	Andrew Cass	2	February 27, 2026	261+	Commerce, CA	Defeated Alan Angels and G. Sharpe in a three-way match at West Coast Pro Evil Empire.	
West Coast Pro Tag Team Championship	Aaron Solo and Alan Angels	1 (1, 1)	March 22, 2026	238+	San Francisco, CA	Defeated The Crush Boys (Starboy Charlie and Titus Alexander) at PWR/West Coast Pro Lucha Libre Night.	
West Coast Pro Women's Championship	Johnnie Robbie	2	November 12, 2026	3+	Las Vegas, NV	Defeated Mio Momono at West Coast Pro 8.	
