= TVC Deportes =

Mexican TV sports channel

- Country: Mexico

Programming
- Picture format: 480i (SDTV)

Ownership
- Owner: PCTV
- Sister channels: TVC, Platino, Panico tv, PlatinoPlus, Cine Mexicano, ARTVC

History
- Launched: 11 August 2007; 18 years ago

TVC Deportes is a Mexican sports channel, founded August 11, 2007. Currently only can be viewed through cable television systems in Mexico. Its programming combines both national and international sports, a sports news program (TVC Deportes Total), and several analysis programs dedicated to other sports.

Is part of TVC Networks, is the business unit of PCTV (In Spanish:Productora de Comercializacion de Television por Cable) engaged in planning, design, development, production and distribution of audiovisual content.

In 2007 TVC Deportes signed a deal with CONADE to broadcast sports events of that organization.

== Media Coverage ==
American football:

- X League
- NCAA

Baseball:

- Mexican Baseball League
- Mexican Pacific League

Basketball:

- Liga Nacional de Baloncesto Profesional
- Liga Nacional de Baloncesto Profesional Femenil
- CIBACOPA
- Liga ACB

Football:

- Liga Premier
- UEFA Women's Champions League
- Coupe de France

Softball:

- Mexican Softball League

Tennis:

- WTA

Volleyball:

- Liga de Voleibol Profesional de México

Motorsport:

- Asian Le Mans Series
