= Total Nonstop Action (pay-per-view series) =

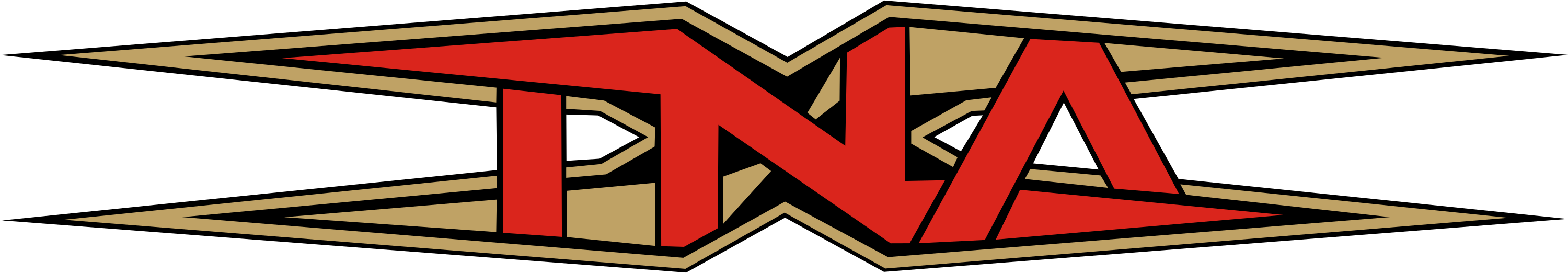
- Also known as: NWA Total Nonstop Action
- Genre: Professional wrestling
- Created by: Jeff Jarrett
- Starring: TNA roster
- Country of origin: United States
- Original language: English

Production
- Camera setup: Multi-camera setup
- Production company: TNA Entertainment, LLC

Original release
- Network: Pay-per-view
- Release: June 19, 2002 – September 8, 2004

Total Nonstop Action was a weekly professional wrestling pay-per-view series produced by Total Nonstop Action Wrestling (TNA) in partnership with the National Wrestling Alliance (NWA) which aired from June 19, 2002, to September 8, 2004.

== History ==
=== Premiere in Huntsville and relocation to Nashville (2002–2003) ===
Following the closure of World Championship Wrestling (WCW), professional wrestling journalist Bob Ryder, Jeff Jarrett, and Jerry Jarrett contemplated their futures in the professional wrestling business under a parent company known as J Sports & Entertainment, LLC. During a fishing trip, Ryder had suggested to start a promotion not reliant on television, but rather one airing regularly on pay-per-view. The first NWA Total Nonstop Action pay-per-view first aired on June 19, 2002, from the Von Braun Center in Huntsville, Alabama. The event featured several celebrity guests including NASCAR drivers Sterling Marlin and Hermie Sadler along with country music star Toby Keith. The event was main evented by Ken Shamrock taking on Malice in a Gauntlet for the Gold final match for the vacant NWA World Heavyweight Championship following a battle royal to determine the two finalists. During the same night, a second pay-per-view was taped to be aired on June 26, 2002, and featured AJ Styles vs. Jerry Lynn vs. Low Ki vs. Psicosis in a four-way double elimination match to crown the inaugural NWA-TNA X Championship. On July 3, 2002, NWA-TNA had relocated their events to the Nashville Municipal Auditorium in Nashville, Tennessee beginning with the fourth weekly pay-per-view. Beginning on July 24, 2002, the Total Nonstop Action weekly pay-per-views permanently relocated to the "TNA Asylum" at the Tennessee State Fairgrounds Sports Arena. On June 18, 2003, NWA-TNA presented their first anniversary show which featured Jeff Jarrett and Sting taking on AJ Styles and Syxx-Pac in a tag team match. The September 3, 2003, edition of Total Nonstop Action also featured the inaugural 2003 Super X Cup tournament which was taped on August 20, 2003, and featured wrestlers such as Nosawa, Teddy Hart, Jonny Storm, Chris Sabin, Jerry Lynn, Frankie Kazarian, and Michael Shane.

=== Final year (2004) ===
By the beginning of 2004, TNA had dropped the NWA from its branding but they had continued to use the NWA belts including the NWA World Heavyweight Championship and the NWA World Tag Team Championship until the agreement ended in 2007. From February 11, 2004, to March 31, 2004, TNA held the inaugural America's X Cup Tournament which featured four teams of four representing TNA, Canada, Mexico, and Team Japan with Jerry Lynn, Petey Williams, Héctor Garza, and Nosawa serving as captains of their respective teams.

Following the launch of Impact, TNA had begun to phase out their weekly pay-per-views in favor of switching to a monthly pay-per-view format. The final weekly TNA pay-per-view took place on September 8, 2004, and would be the final TNA event to take place outside of the Impact Zone at Universal Studios Florida to take place until 2005.
