= Titus Alexander =

American professional wrestler (born 2000)

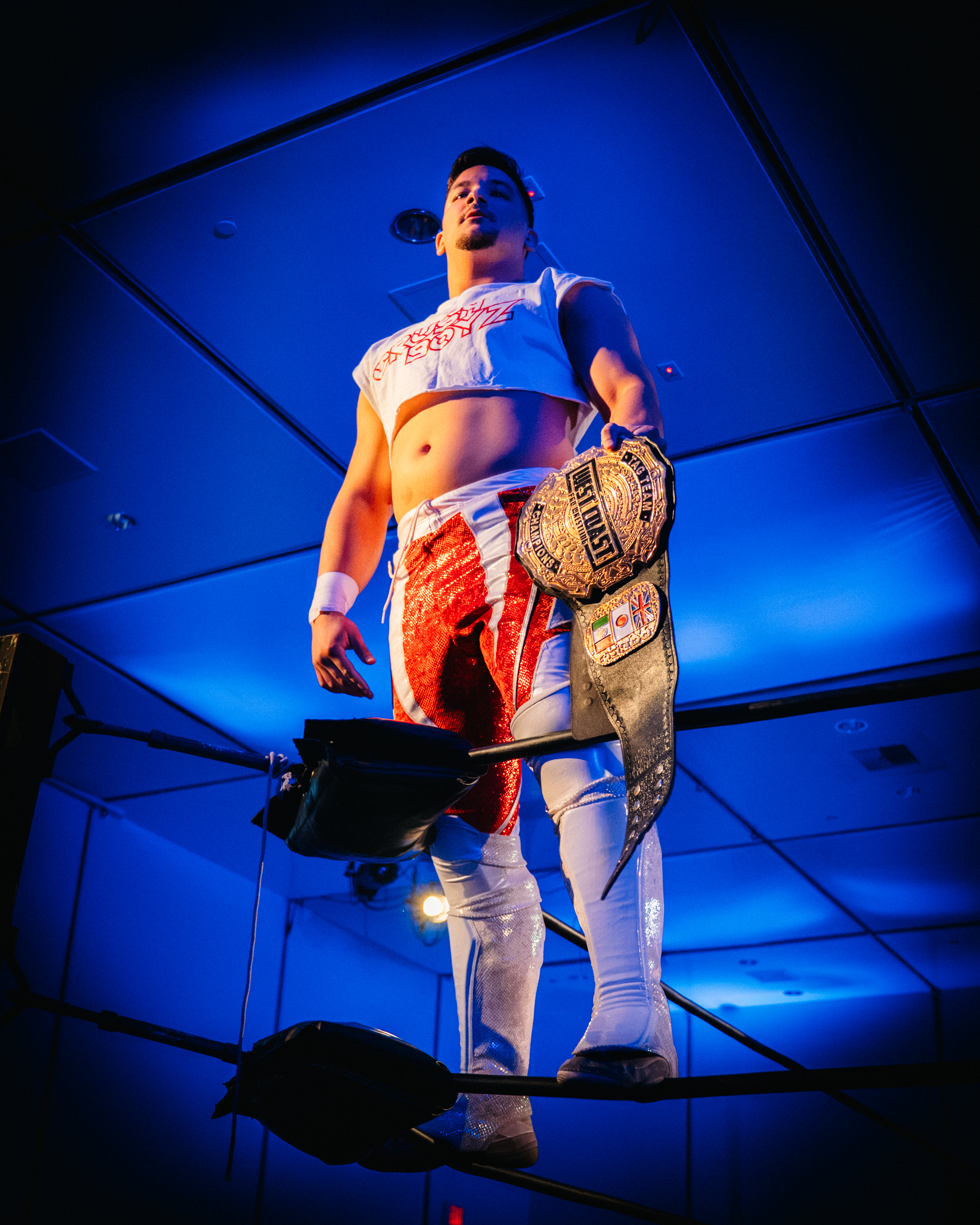
- Alexander in April 2025

Personal information
- Born: September 27, 2000 (age 26) Sacramento, California

Professional wrestling career
- Ring name(s): El Local #1; Titus Alexander
- Billed height: 6 ft 0 in (183 cm)
- Billed weight: 202 lb (92 kg)
- Trained by: JD Bishop; Brandon Bishop
- Debut: 2018

Titus Jimenez, better known by his ring name Titus Alexander is an American professional wrestler currently performing on the independent circuit.

== Professional wrestling career ==
=== American independent circuit (2018–present) ===
Jimenez made his professional wrestling debut at DOA We've Got Heat, an event promoted by Don't Own Anyone Pro Wrestling on July 29, 2018, where he teamed up with Bronson Bishop in a losing effort against No Lives Matter (Derek Drexl and Dr. Kliever). He is known for his tenures with various promotions from the American independent scene with which he has shared brief or longer stints such as All Pro Wrestling, West Coast Pro, Black Label Pro, Prestige Wrestling and many others.

Jimenez once competed in a match promoted by WWE's 205 Live branch of events entitled WWE 205 Live #133 from November 6, 2019, where he teamed up with an undocumented partner in a losing effort against The Singh Brothers (Samir and Sunil Singh).

At PWG Twenty: Mystery Vortex, an event promoted by Pro Wrestling Guerrilla on August 13, 2023, Jimenez fell short to Jon Moxley. At NJPW Strong's Fighting Spirit Unleashed 2023, he teamed up with Jakob Austin Young and Baliyan Akki in a losing effort against Team Filthy (Jorel Nelson, Royce Isaacs and Danny Limelight). At AEW Collision #22 on November 10, 2023, Jimenez fell short to Powerhouse Hobbs in singles competition.

=== Game Changer Wrestling (2021–present) ===
Jimenez often competes in bouts promoted by Game Changer Wrestling. He made his debut at LA Fights Volume 1 on November 28, 2021, in the "LA Fights" sister promotion of GCW, where he defeated Midas Kreed in singles competition. At LA Fights Vs. JCW on April 1, 2022, he competed in a "Super Series Of Survivals" tag team match where he teamed up with Bad Dude Tito, Damian Drake, Hunter Freeman, Jordan Cruz, Ju Dizz, Lucas Riley and Matt Vandagriff as "Team LA Fights" in a losing effort against "Team JCW" (Bam Sullivan, Brandon Kirk, Charlie Tiger, Ellis Taylor, Janai Kai, Jordan Oliver, Slade and Yoya). He continued to make sporadic appearances in various flagship GCW pay-per-view events. At GCW Downward Spiral on May 28, 2022, he competed in a six-way scramble won by Early Morning Guy Steele and also involving Jimmy Lloyd, Marcus Mathers, Matt Vandagriff and The Rotation. At GCW Lifestyle on May 26, 2023, Jimenez teamed up with Jack Cartwheel and Starboy Charlie and unsuccessfully competed against BUSSY (Allie Katch and Effy) and Mance Warner and Los Mazisos (Ciclope and Miedo Extremo) and John Wayne Murdoch in a three-way six-man tag team match.

=== Japanese independent circuit (2023–2024) ===
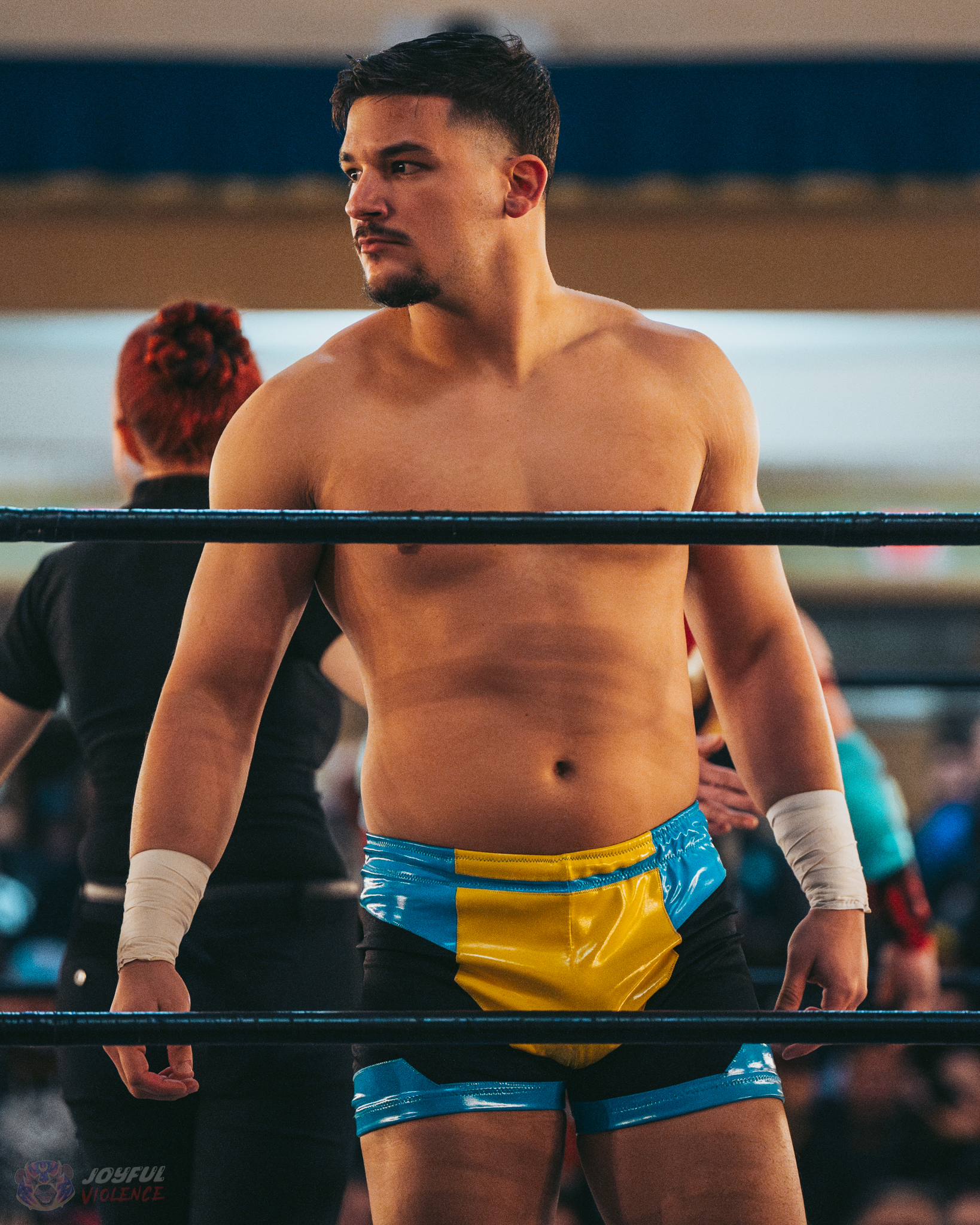
Alexander in February 2024

In late 2023, Jimenez took part into an excursion in the Japanese independent scene. He has competed in a match promoted by Pro Wrestling Zero1 at ZERO1 Yasukuni Shrine Pro-Wrestling Yamato Shinshu Chikara Matsuri on November 25, 2023, where he defeated Alpha Zo and Vinnie Massaro in a three-way match. Jimenez also competed in several bouts hosted by the joshi promotion Marvelous That's Women Pro Wrestling in which he has wrestled against both male and female opponents. At a house show from December 28, 2023, he teamed up with Alpha Zo and Mio Momono to defeat Chikayo Nagashima, Takumi Iroha and Vinnie Massaro in a mixed six-person tag team match.

==== Pro Wrestling Noah (2023–present) ====
Jimenez made his debut in Pro Wrestling Noah at NOAH Monday Magic #3 on November 13, 2023, where he teamed up with Hayata to defeat Atsushi Kotoge and Terry Yaki. He eventually made his pay-per-view debut at Noah The New Year 2024 on January 1, where he teamed up with Vinnie Massaro and El Hijo del Dr. Wagner Jr. in a losing effort against Good Looking Guys (Jake Lee, Jack Morris and Anthony Greene) as a result of a six-man tag team match. On the first night of the Noah Star Navigation 2024 event from January 13, Jimenez teamed up with Massaro to defeat Jack Morris and LJ Cleary of the Good Looking Guys against whom he shared a brief tenure. He main evented the Noah Sunny Voyage 2024 event from January 17, where he unsuccessfully challenged Morris for the GHC National Championship.

== Championships and accomplishments ==
- All Pro Wrestling
  - Young Lions Cup (2019)
- Prestige Wrestling
  - Prestige Championship (1 time)
- POW! Pro Wrestling
  - POW! Championship (1 time)
- Underground Wrestling Alliance
  - UGWA San Jose Championship (1 time)
- Pro Wrestling Illustrated
  - Ranked No. 152 of the top 500 singles wrestlers in the PWI 500 of 2023
- Pro Wrestling Noah
  - GHC Openweight Hardcore Championship (1 time)
- Venue Wrestling Entertainment
  - Best Of The West (2023)
- West Coast Pro Wrestling
  - West Coast Pro Heavyweight Championship (2 times)
  - West Coast Pro Tag Team Championship (2 times) – with Starboy Charlie
  - West Coast Cup (2022)
- Pro Wrestling Revolution
  - King Of Indies (2024)
