= Triller TV =

Combat sports streaming service

- Broadcast area: Worldwide
- Headquarters: Sofia, Bulgaria; Uniondale, Long Island, New York, U.S. Encino, Los Angeles, California, U.S.

Programming
- Language: English

Ownership
- Owner: Flipps Media, Inc.
- Parent: Triller, Inc

History
- Launched: February 9, 2016
- Former names: FITE

Links
- Website: trillertv.com

Triller TV (stylized as TrillerTV, formerly known as FITE, and currently marketed as TrillerTV powered by FITE) is a Bulgarian-based American digital video streaming service.

Owned by Flipps Media, Inc. and operated by its parent company Triller, Inc, TrillerTV is dedicated to combat sports-related programming (including boxing, kickboxing, mixed martial arts, professional wrestling, and submission grappling). The service distributes free-to-air content, pay-per-view events, and SVOD packages. As of December 2023, the service has over 8 million registered users worldwide.

Notable wrestling content available on TrillerTV has included NWA All Access from the National Wrestling Alliance (NWA), AEW Plus from All Elite Wrestling (AEW), and Total Nonstop Action Wrestling (TNA)'s own streaming service TNA+ (then known as Impact Plus), among other subscription packages.

== History ==
=== As FITE ===
Founded in 2012, Flipps Media and their namesake app focused on online streaming content, including entertainment and sporting events. On January 4, 2015, Flipps streamed Global Force Wrestling's presentation of New Japan Pro-Wrestling's Wrestle Kingdom 9 event.

On February 9, 2016, Flipps Media launched FITE (also known as FITE TV), a dedicated combat sports-oriented streaming platform.

In April 2019, FITE officially provided international streaming for the professional wrestling company All Elite Wrestling (AEW), including its weekly televised shows and pay-per-view events. By September of that year, AEW announced a new subscription package on FITE called "AEW Plus" for viewers outside the U.S. that allows them access to AEW's library for $5USD a month.

In April 2020, a new monthly subscription option called FITE+ was launched, including access to live pay-per-view events and back catalogues of various combat sports promotions.

In October 2020, FITE began adding coverage of soccer events, acquiring rights to CONMEBOL qualifiers for the 2022 FIFA World Cup.

On April 14, 2021, Triller, Inc acquired the service for an undisclosed amount, ahead of the first Triller Fight Club event, featuring the Jake Paul vs. Ben Askren boxing match.

In 2021, FITE began streaming professional grappling events after Third Coast Grappling moved to the platform from FloGrappling. In January 2023, it was announced that the North American-based professional grappling promotion Fight 2 Win was leaving FloGrappling and had signed an exclusive two-year deal with FITE.

In 2022, FITE aired the pandemic-delayed 2021 Rugby League World Cup tournaments in several territories including Germany, Italy, Spain and the Americas, with most men's tournament matches available on a pay-per-view basis and all other games airing on FITE+.

In February 2023, FITE announced that all Bare Knuckle Fighting Championship (BKFC) events would be included with FITE+. Previous BKFC events had been offered as standalone pay-per-view events on the service. A majority stake in the promotion was acquired by Triller the previous year.

On May 2, 2023, FITE announced a new partnership with Major League Wrestling (MLW) to air live events through FITE+, with its first event being MLW Never Say Never on July 8 of that year.

On June 30, 2023, Colosseum Tournament was relaunched on FITE after a four-year hiatus.

=== As TrillerTV ===
In December 2023, FITE was rebranded as Triller TV (stylized as TrillerTV and marketed as TrillerTV powered by FITE) to closer align the service with its parent company.

In May 2024, Eric Winter (formerly of Rivals.com and UFC Fight Pass) was named President and Chief Operating Officer of TrillerTV, ahead of its parent company, Triller, going public on NASDAQ.

On May 11, 2026, All Elite Wrestling (AEW) sued Triller TV and its parent company Triller alleging that the service owes AEW $5 million in overdue from pay-per-view buys and proceeds from the AEW Plus service.

== Programming ==
- NWA Powerrr (2023)
- National Wrestling Alliance pay-per-view events (2019–2023)
- Total Nonstop Action Wrestling pay-per-view events (2020–2026)
- BKFC (2022–present)
- FIA TCR World Tour (2024–present)
- All Elite Wrestling pay-per-view events (2019–2026)
- Game Changer Wrestling pay-per-view events (2019–2024)
- Major League Wrestling pay-per-view events (2019–2024)
- Juggalo Championship Wrestling pay-per-view events (2024–2026)
- Maple Leaf Pro Wrestling pay-per-view events (2024–2026)
- Memphis Wrestling (2021–present)
- Colosseum Tournament (2023–present)
- Wrestling Revolver pay-per-view events (2020–2026)
- House of Glory pay-per-view events (2022–2026)
- Progress Wrestling pay-per-view events (2024–2026)
- UWN Championship Wrestling (2020–2026)

== See also ==
- List of professional wrestling streaming services
- FightBox
