= Starboy Charlie =

American professional wrestler

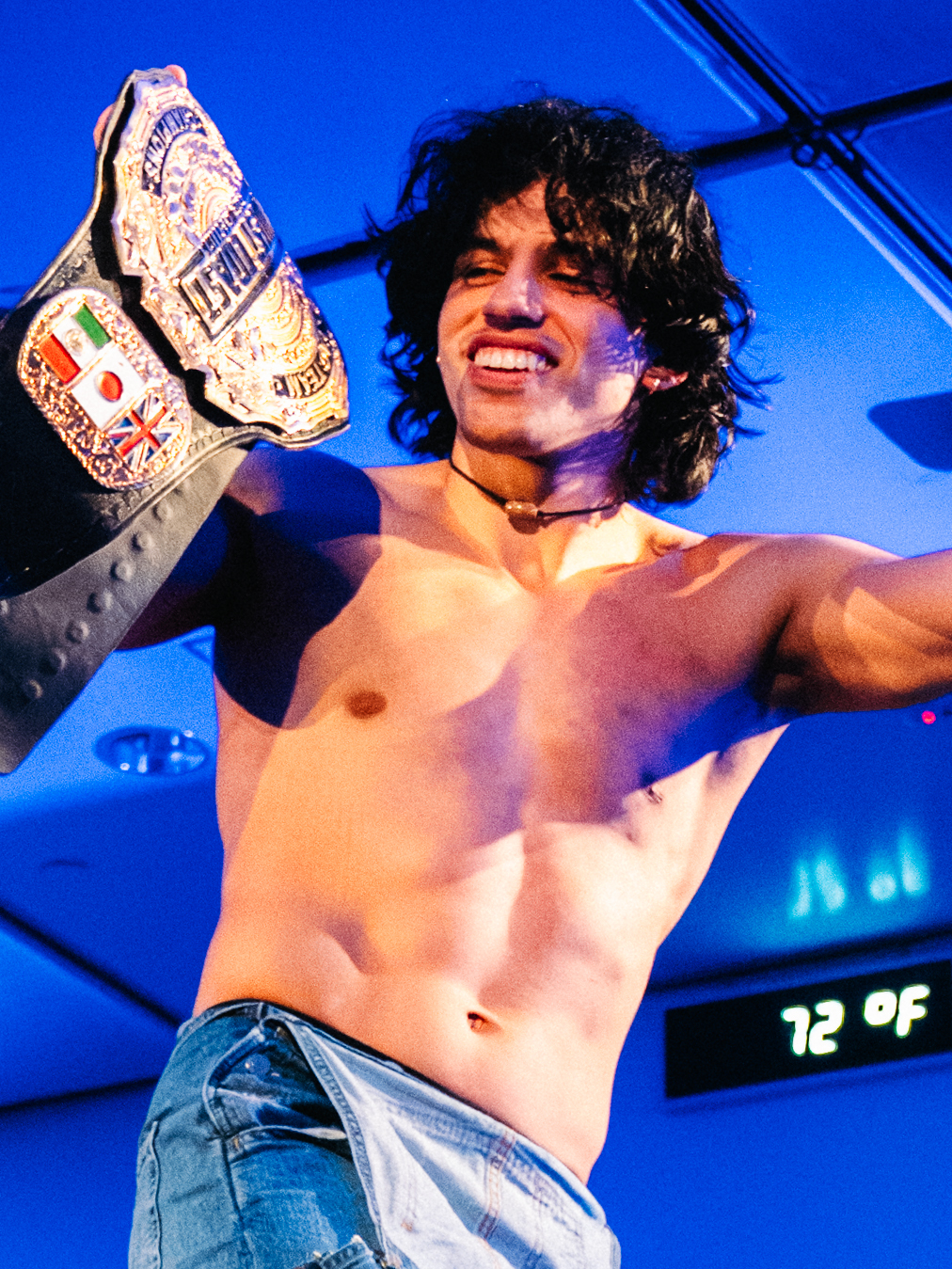
- Charlie in April 2025

Personal information
- Born: Charlie Hilder; February 5, 2003 (age 23) California, United States

Professional wrestling career
- Ring name: Cowboy Charlie Chazz "Starboy" Hall Starboy Charlie
- Billed height: 168 cm (5 ft 6 in)
- Billed weight: 70 kg (154 lb)
- Debut: 2016

Charlie Hilder (born February 5, 2003) is an American professional wrestler signed to WWE, where he is part of the WWE ID program where he was once WWE ID Champion, and performs under the ring name of Chazz "Starboy" Hall. In the American independent circuit, he is known as Starboy Charlie, primarily working for West Coast Pro Wrestling and Game Changer Wrestling (GCW).

== Professional wrestling career ==
=== American independent scene (2016–present) ===
Hilder made his professional wrestling debut at GRPW Band Slam V, an event promoted by Gold Rush Pro Wrestling on January 31, 2016, where he competed in a battle royal won by Boyce LeGrande. He is known for competing in various other promotions from the American independent circuit such as All Pro Wrestling (APW), DEFY Wrestling, Deadlock Pro-Wrestling (DPW) and others.

At DEFY Aftermath on March 15, 2025, Hilder fell short to Clark Connors in the finals of a Super 8XGP Tournament for the vacant DEFY World Championship. At DPW You Already Know 2025 on January 17, he unsuccessfully challenged LaBron Kozone for the DPW National Championship.

On the May 15, 2026, episode of TNA Impact!, Hilder unsuccessfully challenged Mustafa Ali for the TNA International Championship.

=== West Coast Pro Wrestling (2019–present) ===
Hilder is best known for his tenure with West Coast Pro Wrestling. He is a former Heavyweight Champion, title which he has won at West Coast Pro 5 on October 14, 2023, by defeating Titus Alexander, and a former two-time West Coast Tag Team Champion, titles which he has held alongside Alexander as well, as they first won them under the tag name of "The Crush Boys" at West Coast Pro 6th Anniversary on October 11, 2024, by defeating Los Suavecitos (Danny Rose and Ricky Gee).

=== Game Changer Wrestling (2020–present) ===
Hilder made his debut in Game Changer Wrestling at GCW Just Being Honest 2020 on January 24, where he fell short to Gringo Loco, Adrian Quest, Eli Everfly, Matt Vandagriff and Slice Boogie in a six-way scramble. He competed in several of the promotion's signature events. In the Joey Janela's Spring Break series, Hilder made his first appearance at Spring Break 4 on October 10, 2020, where he competed in the traditional Clusterfuck Battle Royal, bout won by "Spyder" Nate Webb which also involved notable opponents such as Cassandro El Exotico, Jody Threat, JTG, Marko Stunt and others. In the GCW Bloodsport series, he made his first appearance at Bloodsport 7 on October 22, 2021, where he fell short to Yoya via knockout. At The People vs. GCW on January 19, 2025, he competed in a Rumble match won by PCO.

During his time with the promotion, he chased for various accomplishments. At GCW Get Lost Alot on September 24, 2021, Hilder teamed up with Chris Dickinson to unsuccessfully challenge The Second Gear Crew (Mance Warner and Matthew Justice) for the GCW Tag Team Championship. At GCW Maniac 2022 on May 21, he unsuccessfully challenged retaining GCW Extreme Champion AJ Gray in a six-way scramble also involving Cole Radrick, Jack Cartwheel, Jimmy Lloyd and Ninja Mack. At GCW Highest In The Room 2 on December 9, 2023, Hilder unsuccessfully challenged Blake Christian for the GCW World Championship.

In the Jersey J-Cup, Hilder made his first appearance at the 2023 edition of the tournament in which he fell short to Joey Janela in the first rounds.

=== Japanese independent circuit (2023–present) ===
Hilder made his first appearance in a New Japan Pro Wrestling event at All Star Junior Festival USA 2023, where he teamed up with Real1 and Jack Cartwheel in a losing effort against Rich Swann, Ryusuke Taguchi and The DKC in six-man tag team competition.

Hilder often goes to multiple "excursions" in Japan to compete in various Pro Wrestling Noah-hosted events. He made his first appearance at Noah Wrestle Magic on May 4, 2024, where he teamed up with Titus Alexander to defeat Ryohei Oiwa and Daiki Inaba. At Noah Grand Ship In Yokohama on June 16, 2024, he unsuccessfully challenged Daga for the GHC Junior Heavyweight Championship. At NOAH Monday Magic Xtreme Season Final on October 27, 2025, he unsuccessfully challenged Hayata and Naruki Doi for the GHC Openweight Hardcore Championship in three-way competition.

=== WWE ID (2026–present) ===
Hilder signed with WWE as a developmental talent of the promotion's WWE ID program created for scouting young talent from the independent promotions. At Wrestling Open RI 44: "One of These Nights", on March 23, 2026, he defeated Cappuccino Jones to win the WWE ID Championship.

== Championships and accomplishments ==
- Pro Wrestling Illustrated
  - Ranked No. 173 of the top 500 singles wrestlers in the PWI 500 of 2024
- Prestige Wrestling
  - Prestige Championship (1 time)
- West Coast Pro Wrestling
  - West Coast Pro Heavyweight Championship (1 time)
  - West Coast Pro Tag Team Championship (2 times) – with Titus Alexander
  - West Coast Cup (2023)
- WWE
  - WWE ID Championship (1 time)
