= Prestige Wrestling =

American defunct professional wrestling promotion

- Founded: 2017
- Defunct: 2026
- Style: Professional wrestling
- Headquarters: Portland, Oregon, U.S.
- Founder: William Quintana
- Owner: William Quintana
- Formerly: Prestige Championship Wrestling
- Website: prestigewrestling.net

Prestige Wrestling, formerly known as Prestige Championship Wrestling (PCW), was an independent professional wrestling promotion founded by William Quintana.

== History ==
Prestige Wrestling was founded as Prestige Championship Wrestling (PCW) in 2017 and held their first show on April 15 at the Eastern Oregon Trade and Event Center in Hermiston, Oregon with the inaugural PCW Heavyweight Champion being crowned at the event in a no disqualification match between Kenny Lush and Mike Santiago. The PCW Heavyweight Championship would change hands on June 23, 2017 during Proving Grounds when former TNA World Tag Team Champion, Davey Richards defeated both Kenny Lush and King Khash in a three way match two win the championship. In late 2017, PCW would change its name to Prestige Wrestling and would hold their first event under their new name on October 27, 2017. Titled Prestige 3: Alpha // Omega, the event featured Tom Lawlor, former WWE NXT Tag Team Champion, Simon Grimm, Billy Gunn, and former ECW World Television Champion, Super Crazy.

On September 29, 2019, Prestige held their first livestreamed event with Prestige Roseland at the Roseland Theater in Portland, Oregon. Featuring commentary by Joe Dombrowski, the show featured Rhyno, All Elite Wrestling's (AEW) Orange Cassidy, and Alex Zayne. The event was headlined by a knockout or submission only match for the Prestige Championship between Tom Lawlor and Chris Dickinson.

On March 31, 2023, Prestige made their Los Angeles debut with their Nervous Breakdown show at the Globe Theatre. The show took place during WrestleMania 39 weekend as part of WrestleCon and was streamed live on Highspots with the main event match being a six man tag team match between the Time Splitters (Alex Shelley and Kushida) and Ultimo Dragon against Team Filthy (Jorel Nelson, Royce Isaacs, and Tom Lawlor). On December 14, 2023, Prestige held a joint show with Tokyo Joshi Pro Wrestling (TJPW). Originally set to be held at the Globe Theatre in Los Angeles, the event was moved to the Vermont Hollywood on after it was reported that the Globe Theatre had shut down. The main event would be a tag team match between MK Ultra (Killer Kelly and Masha Slamovich) and 121000000 (Maki Ito and Miyu Yamashita) and would be streamed live on Wrestle Universe.

On July 12, 2024, Prestige held their first show at the Viking Pavilion in Portland, Oregon and was the first Prestige show to be aired live on YouTube. The show would also feature AEW and Ring of Honor wrestlers Shelton Benjamin, Athena, MxM (Mason Madden and Mansoor), Lio Rush, Roderick Strong, Danhausen, and Evil Uno, Major League Wrestling (MLW) wrestlers Timothy Thatcher and Alan Angels who would defend the Prestige Championship against Evil Uno, and Total Nonstop Action Wrestling (TNA) wrestlers Mike Santana, Sinner and Saint (Judas Icarus and Travis Williams) who would defend the Prestige Tag Team Championship against the Midnight Heat (Eddie Pearl and Ricky Gibson), C4 (Cody Chhun and Guillermo Rosas), and MxM, Masha Slamovich, and Mike Santana. The show would also feature a singles match between Motor City Machine Guns members Alex Shelley and Chris Sabin and would be the final time the two wrestlers fought each other. On July 22, 2024, Prestige teamed up with Deadlock Pro-Wrestling (DPW) and West Coast Pro Wrestling to present Untouchable at the United Irish Cultural Center in San Francisco, California and would feature Calvin Tankman defending the DPW Worlds Championship against Jiah Jewell, Adam Priest defending the DPW National Championship against Vinnie Massaro, and Alan Angels defending the Prestige Championship against Starboy Charlie.

In the summer of 2025, Portland Wrestling, a local promotion in Portland, Oregon announced the cancellation of their booking of Joey Ryan on a show titled Reborn, a former wrestler who was accused of sexual misconduct in 2020 with nearly 20 allegations against him. Prestige Wrestling owner William Quintana responded to the attempt by saying “If you’re on our shows and you willingly share this locker room, help set up at this show or are involved with this show you are getting pulled from all future bookings. So goddamn tired of this stuff. Gatekeep harder.” Quintana also announced that Prestige would be running an event in response to this titled FJR which took place on August 23, 2025 at the Oregon Pro-Wrestling School in Hillsboro, Oregon. The profits from the show would go to the Rape, Abuse & Incest National Network in support of survivors of sexual violence.

On September 16, 2025, it was announced that Prestige was going on an indefinite hiatus after their final show on February 20, 2026. Titled Roseland XIII: The End, the event would be the final show that Prestige would hold before shutting down. On January 10, 2026, Prestige Champion Kevin Blackwood would announce his retirement match would take place on February 20, 2026. In the main event, Blackwood would lose the Prestige Championship to Judas Icarus, ending his nine-year career as a wrestler.

== Championships ==
Championship	Final champion(s)	Date won	Days held	Location
Prestige Championship	Judas Icarus	February 20, 2026	1	Portland, Oregon
Prestige Tag Team Championship	The Hammer Brothers (Jack Hammer and Sledge Hammer)	February 20, 2026	1	Portland, Oregon

== Events ==
=== 2017 ===
Date	Event	Venue	Location	Main Event	Notes
April 15	PCW 1	Eastern Oregon Trade and Event Center	Hermiston, Oregon	Kenny Lush vs. Mike Santiago for the vacant PCW Heavyweight Championship	
June 23	PCW 2: Proving Grounds	Eastern Oregon Trade and Event Center	Hermiston, Oregon	Kenny Kush (c) vs. King Khash vs. Davey Williams for the PCW Heavyweight Championship	
October 27	Prestige 3: Alpha // Omega	Eastern Oregon Trade and Event Center	Hermiston, Oregon	Drexl vs. Sonico in a falls count anywhere match	
(c) – refers to the champion(s) heading into the match

=== 2018 ===
Date	Event	Venue	Location	Main Event	Notes
March 30	Prestige 4: Do or Die	Eastern Oregon Trade and Event Center	Hermiston, Oregon	Tom Lawlor vs. MV Young in a Prestige Championship tournament first round no disqualification loser leaves Prestige match	
May 11	Prestige 5: Valley Clash	Benton County Fairgrounds	Corvallis, Oregon	Simon Grimm vs. Tom Lawlor	
June 8	Prestige 6: Reality Unfolds	Eastern Oregon Trade and Event Center	Hermiston, Oregon	King Khash vs. Tom Lawlor in a Prestige Championship tournament final round match	
October 12	Prestige 7: Revenge I Seek	Eastern Oregon Trade and Event Center	Hermiston, Oregon	Sonico vs. Drexi	
December 8	Rise or Die Trying	Eastern Oregon Trade and Event Center	Hermiston, Oregon	King Khash (c) vs. Sonico for the Prestige Championship	
(c) – refers to the champion(s) heading into the match

=== 2019 ===
Date	Event	Venue	Location	Main Event	Notes
February 22	Tower of Snakes	Eastern Oregon Trade and Event Center	Hermiston, Oregon	King Khash (c) vs. Tom Lawlor for the Prestige Championship	
May 3	Viva La Raza	Eastern Oregon Trade and Event Center	Hermiston, Oregon	Tom Lawlor (c) vs. MV Young for the Prestige Championship	
May 24	The New Fury	The Pin	Spokane, Washington	Simon Grimm vs. Darby Allin	
June 29	Attribute of the Strong	Bossanova Ballroom	Portland, Oregon	Tom Lawlor (c) vs. Simon Grimm for the Prestige Championship	
September 29	Roseland	Roseland Theater	Portland, Oregon	Tom Lawlor (c) vs. Chris Dickinson in a knockout or submission only match for the Prestige Championship	
October 18	Live by the Code	Uptown Theater	Richland, Washington	Tom Lawlor (c) vs. Tyler Bateman for the Prestige Championship	
November 15	Rise or Die Trying	The Pin	Spokane, Washington	Tom Lawlor (c) vs. Drexl vs. Ethan HD vs. Sonico vs. Zicky Dice for the Prestige Championship	
(c) – refers to the champion(s) heading into the match

=== 2022 ===
Date	Event	Venue	Location	Main Event	Notes
February 20	Roseland 2	Roseland Theater	Portland, Oregon	Malakai Black vs. Davey Richards	
February 27	Rise Above	The Glass House	Pomona, California	Alex Shelley (c) vs. Dalton Castle vs. Mike Bailey vs. Tom Lawlor for the Prestige Championship	
March 11	Savage Mode	The State Room	San Francisco, California	AJ Gray (c) vs. Jacob Fatu for the West Coast Pro Heavyweight Championship	Co-produced with West Coast Pro Wrestling
March 12	As Real as it Gets	Santa Cruz County Veterans Memorial Building	Santa Cruz, California	Titus Alexander (c) vs. Alex Shelley vs. Rey Horus in a three way match for the Prestige Championship	Co-produced with West Coast Pro Wrestling
March 13	Among The Living	Colonial Theater	Sacramento, California	Kevin Blackwood vs. Tom Lawlor	
March 15	Make Your Own History	Kliever Memorial Armory	Portland, Oregon	Athena vs. Taya Valkyrie	
March 16	Make Your Own History	Uptown Theater	Richland, Washington	Alex Shelley (c) vs. Alan Angels vs. Kevin Blackwood in a three way match for the Prestige Championship	
March 28	Roseland 3	Roseland Theater	Portland, Oregon	Maki Itoh (c) vs. Mia Yim for the TJPW International Princess Championship	
March 29	Roseland 3	Roseland Theater	Portland, Oregon	Miyu Yamashita vs. Maki Itoh	
July 27	The New Reality	The Glass House	Pomona, California	Konosuke Takeshita vs. Lee Moriarty	
September 3	Nonstop Feeling	Hawthorne Theatre	Portland, Oregon	Konosuke Takeshita vs. Kevin Blackwood	
September 17	Savage Mode II	Colonial Theatre	Sacramento, California	Titus Alexander vs. Davey Richards	Co-produced with West Coast Pro Wrestling
September 25	Talk is Cheap	Hawthorne Theatre	Portland, Oregon	Drexl vs. Funny Bone	
October 30	Roseland 4: Wake The Dead	Roseland Theater	Portland, Oregon	Alex Shelley (c) vs. Yamato for the Prestige Championship	
December 30	The Things We Carry	White Eagle Pub	Worcester, Massachusetts	The Motor City Machine Guns (Alex Shelley and Chris Sabin) vs. The American Wolves (Davey Richards and Eddie Edwards)	
(c) – refers to the champion(s) heading into the match

=== 2023 ===
Date	Event	Venue	Location	Main Event	Notes
January 21	Vendetta	The Glass House	Pomona, California		
February 17	Reality Unfolds	Hawthorne Theatre	Portland, Oregon		
March 26	Hybrid Moments	House of Independents	Asbury Park, New Jersey		
March 31	Nervous Breakdown	Globe Theatre	Los Angeles, California	Time Splitters (Alex Shelley and Kushida) and Ultimo Dragon vs. Team Filthy (Jorel Nelson, Royce Isaacs, and Tom Lawlor) in a six man tag team match	held in conjunction with WrestleCon
April 29	Roseland 5	Roseland Theater	Portland, Oregon	Penta El Zero M vs. Kevin Blackwood	
June 18	Black Sunshine	Globe Theatre	Los Angeles, California		
July 8 (aired July 16)	Cascadia Wrestling Cup	Kliever Armory	Portland, Oregon		
July 8 (aired July 16)	Cascadia Wrestling Cup	Kliever Armory	Portland, Oregon		
July 23	All Rise	House of Independents	Asbury Park, New Jersey		
September 1	Roseland 6	Roseland Theater	Portland, Oregon	Midnight Heat (Eddie Pearl and Ricky Gibson) (c) vs. C4 (Cody Chhun and Guillermo Rosas) for the Prestige Tag Team Championship	
September 9	No Art, No Cowboys, No Rules	Missoula Fairgrounds	Missoula, Montana		
September 24	The Respect Issue	Globe Theatre	Los Angeles, California		
October 12	Decimate The Weak	Kliever Armory	Portland, Oregon		
November 12 (aired November 18)	Alive	Hawthorne Theatre	Portland, Oregon		
December 14	Combat Princess USA	Vermont Hollywood	Los Angeles, California	MK Ultra (Killer Kelly and Masha Slamovich) vs. 121000000 (Maki Ito and Miyu Yamashita)	Co-produced with Tokyo Joshi Pro Wrestling Prestige's first pay-per-view
(c) – refers to the champion(s) heading into the match

=== 2024 ===
Date	Event	Venue	Location	Main Event	Notes
January 5	Roseland 7	Roseland Theater	Portland, Oregon	Alex Shelley (c) vs. Chris Sabin vs. Alan Angels vs. Nick Wayne in a four way match for the Prestige Championship	
February 25	A Moment of Violence	Vermont Hollywood	Los Angeles, California		
March 24 (aired March 31)	Alive II	Hawthorne Theatre	Portland, Oregon		
April 14	Roseland 8: The 7 Year Anniversary Show	Roseland Theater	Portland, Oregon	Zack Sabre Jr. vs. Daniel Makabe	
April 26	Pride & Prestige	MEET Las Vegas	Las Vegas, Nevada		Co-produced with PrideStyle Pro Wrestling
May 16	Alive or Just Breathing	Vermont Hollywood	Los Angeles, California		
June 7 (aired June 17)	Alive III	Hawthorne Theatre	Portland, Oregon		
July 12	Combat Clash PDX	Viking Pavilion	Portland, Oregon		
June 20	Untouchable	United Irish Cultural Center	San Francisco, California		
August 23 (aired September 3)	Cascadia Wrestling Cup	Kliever Armory	Portland, Oregon		
August 24 (aired September 3)	Cascadia Wrestling Cup	Kliever Armory	Portland, Oregon		
September 29	Roseland 9	Roseland Theater	Portland, Oregon	Alan Angels (c) vs. Mustafa Ali for the Prestige Championship	
November 20 (aired November 30)	Always The Hard Way	Hawthorne Theatre	Portland, Oregon		
(c) – refers to the champion(s) heading into the match

=== 2025 ===
Date	Event	Venue	Location	Main Event	Notes
January 11	Roseland X	Roseland Theater	Portland, Oregon	Kevin Blackwood vs. Masato Tanaka	
March 7 (aired April 2)	Attribute of the Strong	Hawthorne Theatre	Portland, Oregon		
April 12	Roseland XI	Roseland Theater	Portland, Oregon	Alan Angels (c) vs. Timothy Thatcher for the Prestige Championship	
April 17	Nothing to Lose	MEET Las Vegas	Las Vegas, Nevada		
May 15	Conquer The World	Kliever Armory	Portland, Oregon		
June 1	Unit3d	Vermont Hollywood	Los Angeles, California		
July 13	Combat Clash	Viking Pavilion	Portland, Oregon	Alan Angels (c) vs. Judas Icarus in a steel cage match for the Prestige Championship	
July 26	Cruel Summer	United Irish Cultural Center	San Francisco, California		
August 23	FJR	Oregon Pro-Wrestling School	Hillsboro, Oregon		
August 24	Shark Ethic	Morrison Market	Portland, Oregon		
October 5 (aired October 14)	Roseland XII	Roseland Theater	Portland, Oregon	Judas Icarus (c) vs. Kevin Blackwood for the Prestige Championship	
November 2	Big Kiss Goodnight	Morrison Market	Portland, Oregon		
November 7	Strength Beyond Strength	The Compound by Dirt Dog	Commerce, California		
(c) – refers to the champion(s) heading into the match

=== 2026 ===
Date	Event	Venue	Location	Main Event	Notes
February 19 (aired April 15)	Celebration of Life	Oregon Pro-Wrestling School	Hillsboro, Oregon	Kevin Blackwood (c) vs. Amira for the Prestige Championship	
February 20	Prestige Roseland XIII: The End	Roseland Theater	Portland, Oregon	Kevin Blackwood (c) vs. Judas Icarus for the Prestige Championship	The final Prestige Wrestling show
(c) – refers to the champion(s) heading into the match
