= Prestige Championship =

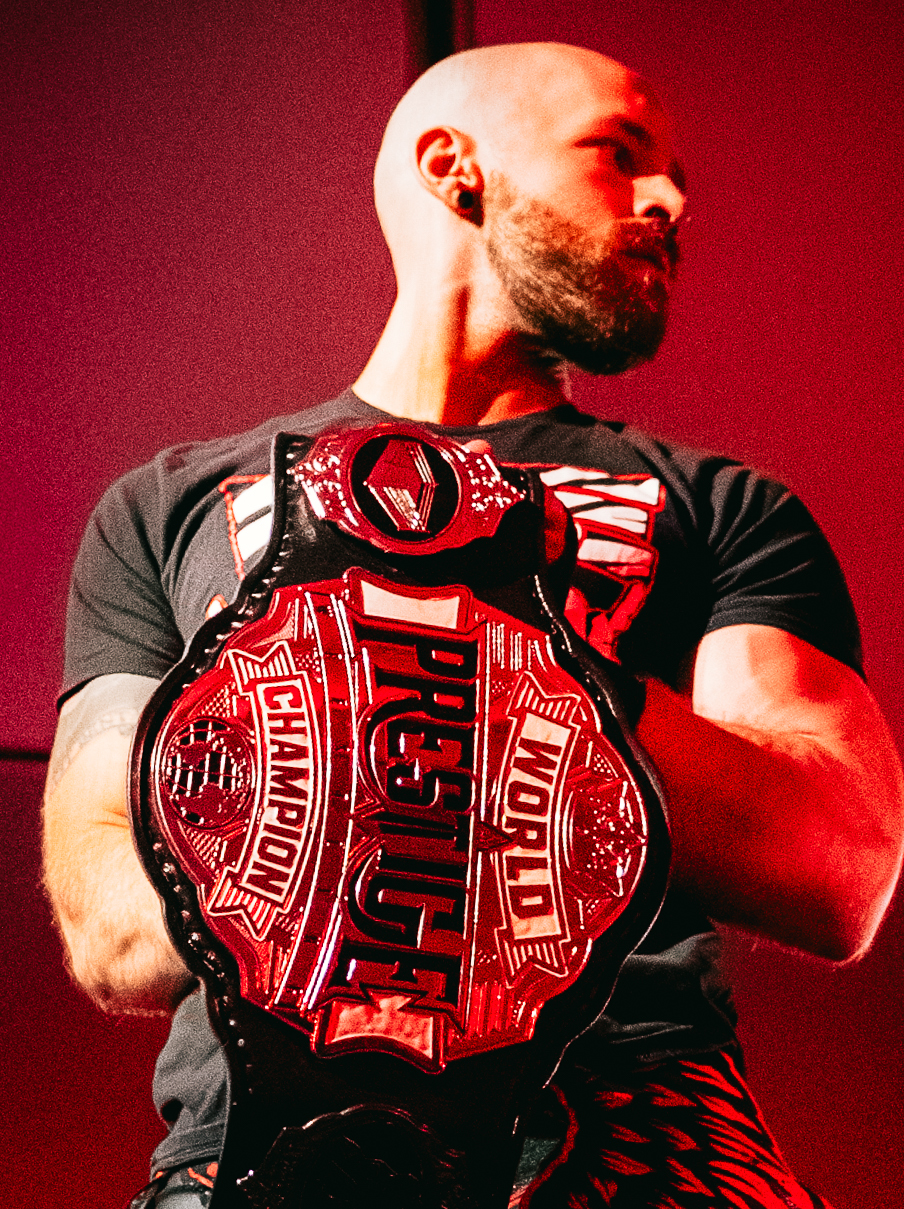
- Alan Angels holding the championship in April 2025.

Details
- Promotion: Prestige Wrestling
- Date established: April 15, 2017
- Date retired: February 20, 2026

Other name
- PCW Heavyweight Championship (2017-2018)
Statistics
- First champion: Kenny Lush
- Final champion: Judas Icarus
- Most reigns: 2 reigns: Alan Angels; Alex Shelley
- Longest reign: Tom Lawlor (1094 days)
- Shortest reign: 1 day: Judas Icarus; Titus Alexander

The Prestige Championship was a professional wrestling championship that was created and promoted by Prestige Wrestling. The final champion was Judas Icarus who won the title on February 20, 2026 at Roseland XIII: The End in Portland, Oregon by defeating Kevin Blackwood.

== Title history ==
Key

No.	Overall reign number
Reign	Reign number for the specific champion
Days	Number of days held
+	Current reign is changing daily

No.	Wrestler	Reign	Date	Days held	Venue	Location	Event	Notes	Ref.
1	Kenny Lush	1	April 15, 2017	69	Eastern Oregon Trade and Event Center	Hermiston, Oregon	PCW 1		
2	Davey Richards	1	June 23, 2017	280	Eastern Oregon Trade and Event Center	Hermiston, Oregon	PCW 2		
–	Vacated		March 30, 2018					The title was vacated in 2018 because Davey Richards stopped defending it.	
3	King Khash	1	June 8, 2018	259	Eastern Oregon Trade and Event Center	Hermiston, Oregon	Prestige 6: Reality Unfolds	Defeated Tom Lawlor by referee's decision	
4	Tom Lawlor	1	February 22, 2019	1094	Eastern Oregon Trade and Event Center	Hermiston, Oregon	Tower of Snakes		
5	Alex Shelley	1	February 22, 2022	19	Roseland Theater	Portland, Oregon	Roseland 2	Defeated Tom Lawlor and Dalton Castle in a three way match	
6	Titus Alexander	1	February 22, 2022	1	The State Room	San Francisco, California	Prestige/West Coast Pro Savage Mode		
7	Alex Shelley	2	March 12, 2022	743	Santa Cruz County Veterans Memorial Building	Santa Cruz, California	Prestige/West Coast Pro As Real as it Gets		
8	Alan Angels	1	March 24, 2024	118	Hawthorne Theatre	Portland, Oregon	Alive II		
9	Starboy Charlie	1	July 20, 2024	51	United Irish Cultural Center	San Francisco, California	West Coast Pro/DPW/Prestige Untouchable		
10	Alan Angels	2	September 9, 2024	307	Shin-Kiba 1st RING	Tokyo, Japan	Marvelous event		
11	Kevin Blackwood	1	July 13, 2025	84	Viking Pavilion	Portland, Oregon	Combat Clash		
13	Judas Icarus	1	February 20, 2026	1	Roseland Theater	Portland, Oregon	Roseland XIII: The End		
–	Deactivated		February 20, 2026					Deactivated when Prestige ceased operations	
