= Prestige Tag Team Championship =

Details
- Promotion: Prestige Wrestling
- Date established: February 20, 2022
- Date retired: February 20, 2026
Statistics
- First champions: C4 (Cody Chhun and Guillermo Rosas)
- Final champions: The Hammer Brothers (Jack Hammer and Sledge Hammer)

The Prestige Tag Team Championship was a professional wrestling tag team championship that was created and promoted by Prestige Wrestling. The final champions were The Hammer Brothers (Jack Hammer and Sledge Hammer) who won the title on February 20, 2026 at Prestige Roseland XIII: The End in Portland, Oregon by defeating Midnight Heat (Eddie Pearl and Ricky Gibson).

== Title history ==
Key

No.	Overall reign number
Reign	Reign number for the specific champion
Days	Number of days held
+	Current reign is changing daily

No.	Wrestlers	Reign	Date	Days held	Venue	Location	Event	Notes	Ref.
1	C4 (Cody Chhun and Guillermo Rosas)	1	February 20, 2022	152	Roseland Theater	Portland, Oregon	Roseland 2		
2	Midnight Heat (Eddie Pearl and Ricky Gibson)	1	July 22, 2022	65	Hawthorne Theatre	Portland, Oregon	Nonstop Feeling		
–	Deactivated		September 25, 2022					Vacated when Midnight Heat stopped defending the titles	
3	Midnight Heat (Eddie Pearl and Ricky Gibson)	2	April 29, 2023	125	Roseland Theater	Portland, Oregon	Roseland 5		
4	C4 (Cody Chhun and Guillermo Rosas)	2	September 1, 2023	126	Roseland Theater	Portland, Oregon	Roseland 6		
5	Sinner and Saint (Judas Icarus and Travis Williams)	1	January 5, 2025	372	Roseland Theater	Portland, Oregon	Roseland 7		
6	UltraPOWER! (Amira and Jaiden)	1	January 11, 2025	91	Roseland Theater	Portland, Oregon	Roseland X		
7	Midnight Heat (Eddie Pearl and Ricky Gibson)	3	April 12, 2025	314	Roseland Theater	Portland, Oregon	Roseland XI		
8	The Hammer Brothers (Jack Hammer and Sledge Hammer)	1	February 20, 2026	1	Roseland Theater	Portland, Oregon	Roseland XIII: The End		
–	Deactivated		February 20, 2026					Deactivated when Prestige ceased operations	
