= Prestige Roseland XIII: The End =

2026 professional wrestling event in Portland, Oregon, U.S.

- Promotional poster
- Promotion: Prestige Wrestling
- Date: February 20, 2026
- City: Portland, Oregon
- Venue: Roseland Theater

Prestige Wrestling event chronology
← Previous; Celebration of Life	Next → Final

Roseland event chronology
← Previous; XII	Next → Final

Prestige Roseland XIII: The End was the thirteenth and final Roseland professional wrestling livestreaming event produced by Prestige Wrestling. This was the final event held by Prestige Wrestling before closing its doors. The event took place on February 20, 2026 at the Roseland Theater in Portland, Oregon and was streamed live on YouTube.

== Production ==
=== Background ===
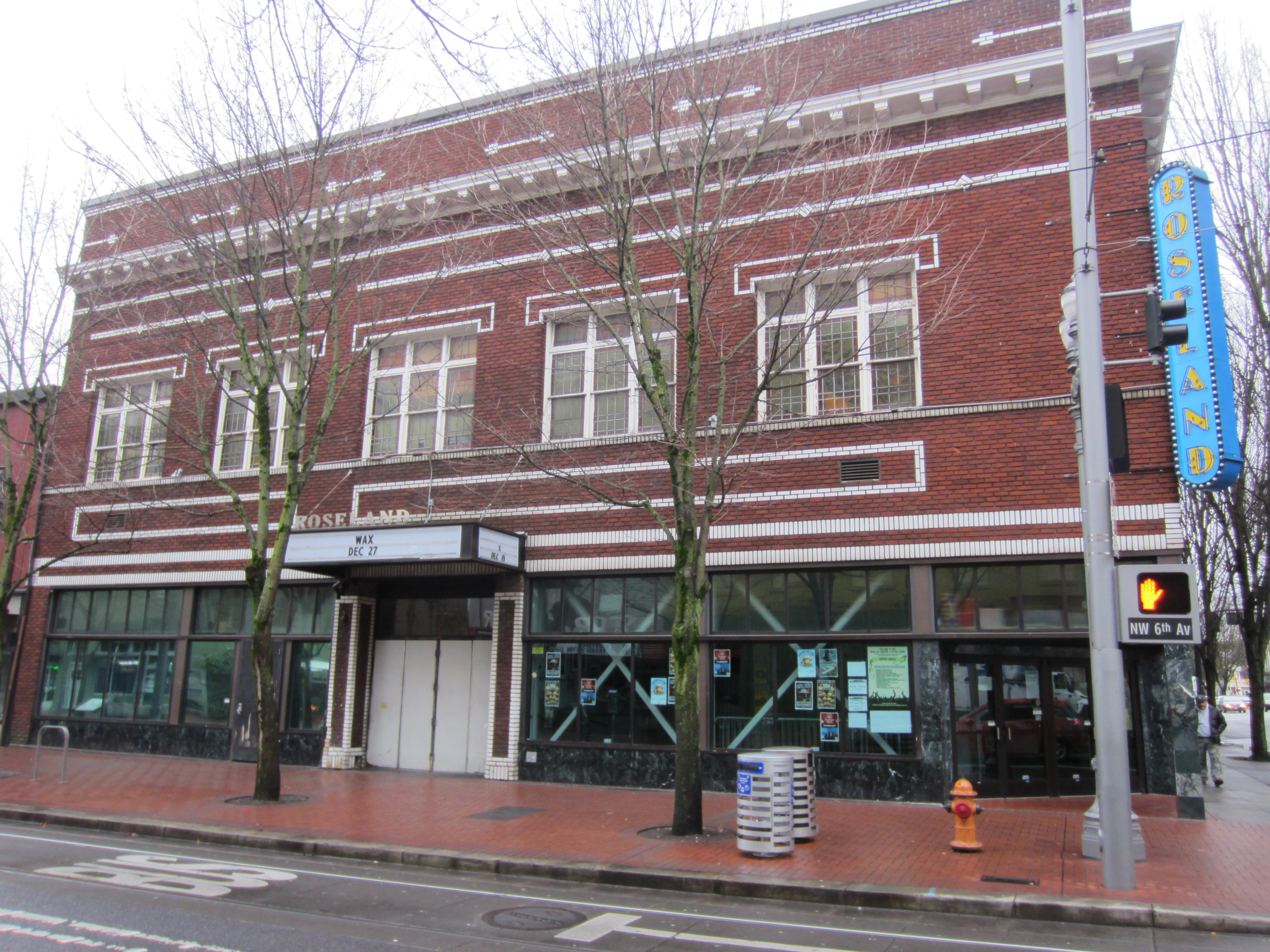
Exterior of the Roseland Theater, 2014

Since 2019, Prestige has held various recurring shows at the Roseland Theater under the Roseland title. On September 29, 2019, Prestige held their first livestreamed event with Prestige Roseland at the Roseland Theater in Portland, Oregon. Featuring commentary by Joe Dombrowski, the show featured Rhyno, All Elite Wrestling's (AEW) Orange Cassidy, and Alex Zayne. The event was headlined by a knockout or submission only match for the Prestige Championship between Tom Lawlor and Chris Dickinson.

On September 16, 2025, it was announced that Prestige was going on an indefinite hiatus after their final show. On November 20, 2025, Prestige announced that their final event would be titled Prestige Roseland XIII: The End and that it would be set to be held on February 20, 2026.

On January 1, 2026 Prestige announced that Minoru Suzuki would be fighting against Matt Brannigan during the event. On January 10, 2026, Prestige Champion Kevin Blackwood announced his retirement match would take place on February 20, 2026 in which he would be defending the Prestige Championship against Judas Icarus.

=== Storylines ===
Prestige Roseland XIII: The End featured professional wrestling matches that involves different wrestlers from pre-existing scripted feuds and storylines. Wrestlers portrayed villains, heroes, or less distinguishable characters in scripted events that built tension and culminated in a wrestling match or series of matches. Storylines were produced on Prestige Wrestling's various events.

== Results ==
No.	Results	Stipulations	Times
1	Travis Williams defeated Alan Angels by pinfall	Singles match	16:59
2	C4 (Cody Chhun and Guillermo Rosas) defeated Amerikan Gunz (Ethan HD and Mike Santiago) and Los Suavecitos (Danny Rose and Ricky Gee) by pinfall	Three-way Tag team match	12:19
3	Brooke Havok defeated Haley Dylan by pinfall	Singles match	8:38
4	Minoru Suzuki defeated Matt Brannigan by pinfall	Singles match	14:14
5	Jordan Cruz defeated Ryan Clancy by pinfall	Singles match	8:27
6	War Machines (Drexl, JAIDEN, Spencer Scott, and Zaye Perez) defeated United Front (Casey Ferreira, Cole Rivera, Elliot Tyler, and Sid Sylum) by pinfall	Eight-man tag team Roseland Riot match	20:02
7	Ryan Clancy defeated AJ Koston, Alan Angels, Brenden Royce, Caleb Teninty, Charly Avell, Chris Nastyy, Derek Shaw, Ducky Dang, El Tigre Oro, Franky Duv, G. Sharpe, Jiah Jewell, Joey Thorton, Jordan Cruz, Maseemo, Miko Alana, Naomi King, Ocean Avery, Parm Singh Mann, Sonico, Tengu, and Zeb Saint One	Roseland Rumble match	16:50
8	Johnnie Robbie (c) defeated Amira by pinfall	Singles match for the West Coast Pro Women's Championship	13:24
9	The Hammer Brothers (Jack Hammer and Sledge Hammer) (c) defeated Midnight Heat (Eddie Pearl and Ricky Gibson) by pinfall	Tag team match for the Prestige Tag Team Championship	21:38
10	Judas Icarus defeated Kevin Blackwood (c) by pinfall	Singles match for the Prestige Championship	32:43
(c) / – the champion(s) heading into the match
