= Davey Richards =

American professional wrestler

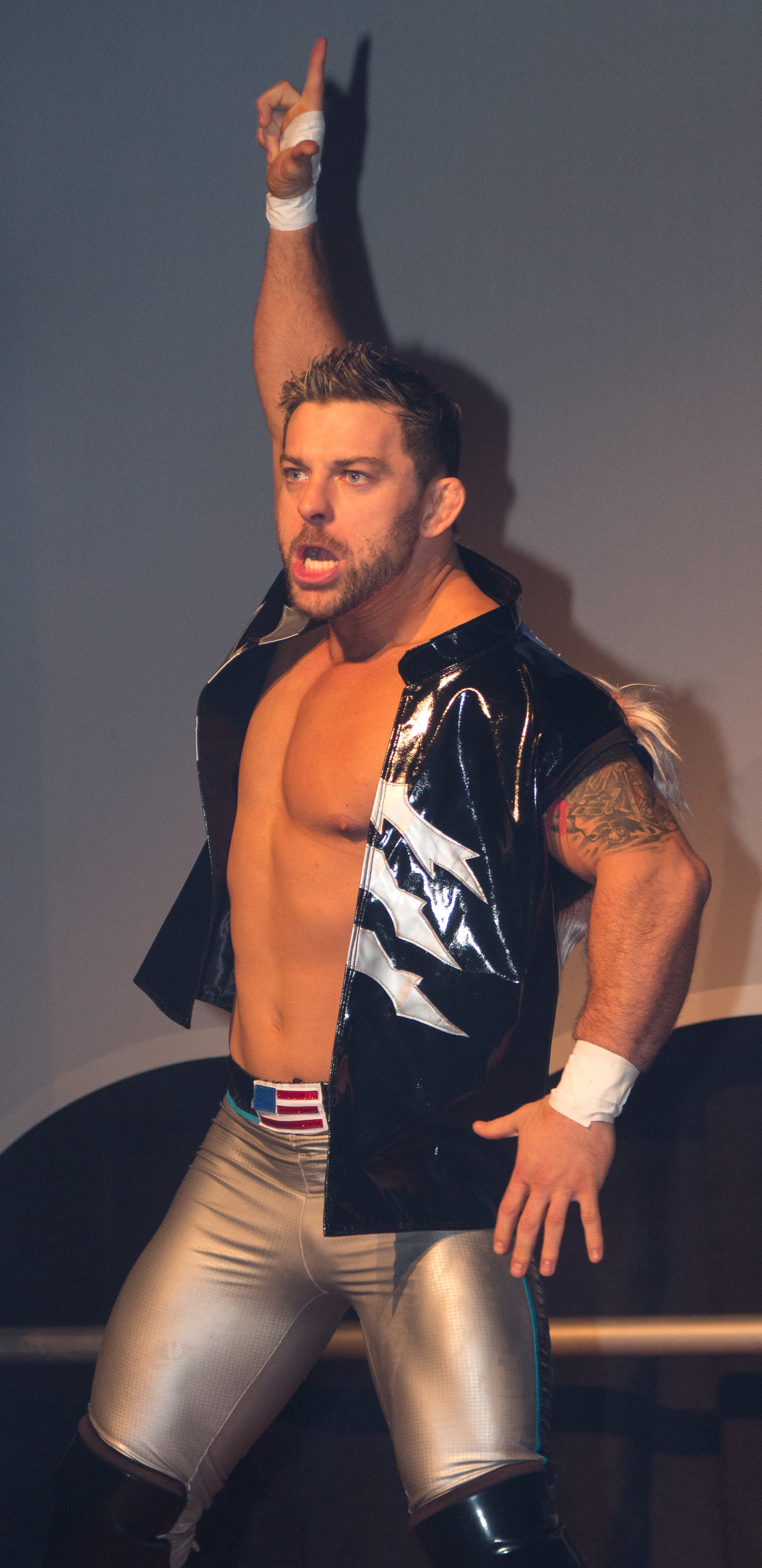
- Richards in 2013

Personal information
- Born: Wesley David Richards; March 1, 1983 (age 43) Othello, Washington, U.S.
- Spouses: Christie Summers (m. 2008; div. 2010) Angelina Love (m. 2015; div. 2017) Melissa Richards (m. 2019; div. 2023)
- Children: 1

Professional wrestling career
- Ring name(s): Davey Phoenix; Davey Richards; Snowball; Wayne Kerr; Derek Billington
- Billed height: 5 ft 8 in (173 cm)
- Billed weight: 202 lb (92 kg)
- Billed from: Othello, Washington; St. Louis, Missouri
- Trained by: Tony Kozina; Paul Orndorff
- Debut: 2004
- Retired: March 17, 2023

Wesley David Richards (born March 1, 1983), best known under the ring name Davey Richards, is an American retired professional wrestler, He is best known for his time in TNA Wrestling and Ring of Honor, and for several independent promotions, including Pro Wrestling Guerrilla (PWG) and Full Impact Pro (FIP). He is also known for his time in Major League Wrestling (MLW), where he was a former one-time MLW National Openweight Champion.

Richards also worked internationally in Pro Wrestling Noah through ROH's involvement in the Global Professional Wrestling Alliance, a global organization of cooperative promotions that allow their competitors to travel abroad to other companies, and in New Japan Pro-Wrestling.

Richards was a former one-time ROH World Champion. He is also a thirteen-time world tag team champion, having won the ROH World Tag Team Championship three times (once with Rocky Romero and twice with Eddie Edwards), as well as a two-time IWGP Junior Heavyweight Tag Team Champion (with Rocky Romero) and the TNA World Tag Team Champion with Eddie Edwards five times. He has also won several titles in the Independent circuit, most notably the CZW World Heavyweight Championship, PWG World Championship, the FIP World Heavyweight Championship twice and the PWG World Tag Team Championship three times (with Super Dragon twice and Roderick Strong once). Richards was the winner of several tournaments that highlight the top performers of the United States, most notably East Coast Wrestling Association's (ECWA) Super 8 Tournament in 2006 and PWG's Battle of Los Angeles in the same year.

== Professional wrestling career ==
=== Early career (2004–2005) ===
Prior to entering professional wrestling, Richards was an accomplished amateur wrestler in high school, as well as learning Muay Thai and Brazilian jiu-jitsu. Richards began training in 2004 with Tony Kozina before making his debut in June of the same year in the Washington-based company, Pro Wrestling War against a wrestler named Mr. Sexy. Richards also spent time training with Paul Orndorff in Atlanta, while working at the same time at a Duracell factory an hour-and-a-half drive away in Cleveland, Tennessee.

=== Pro Wrestling Guerrilla (2005–2013) ===
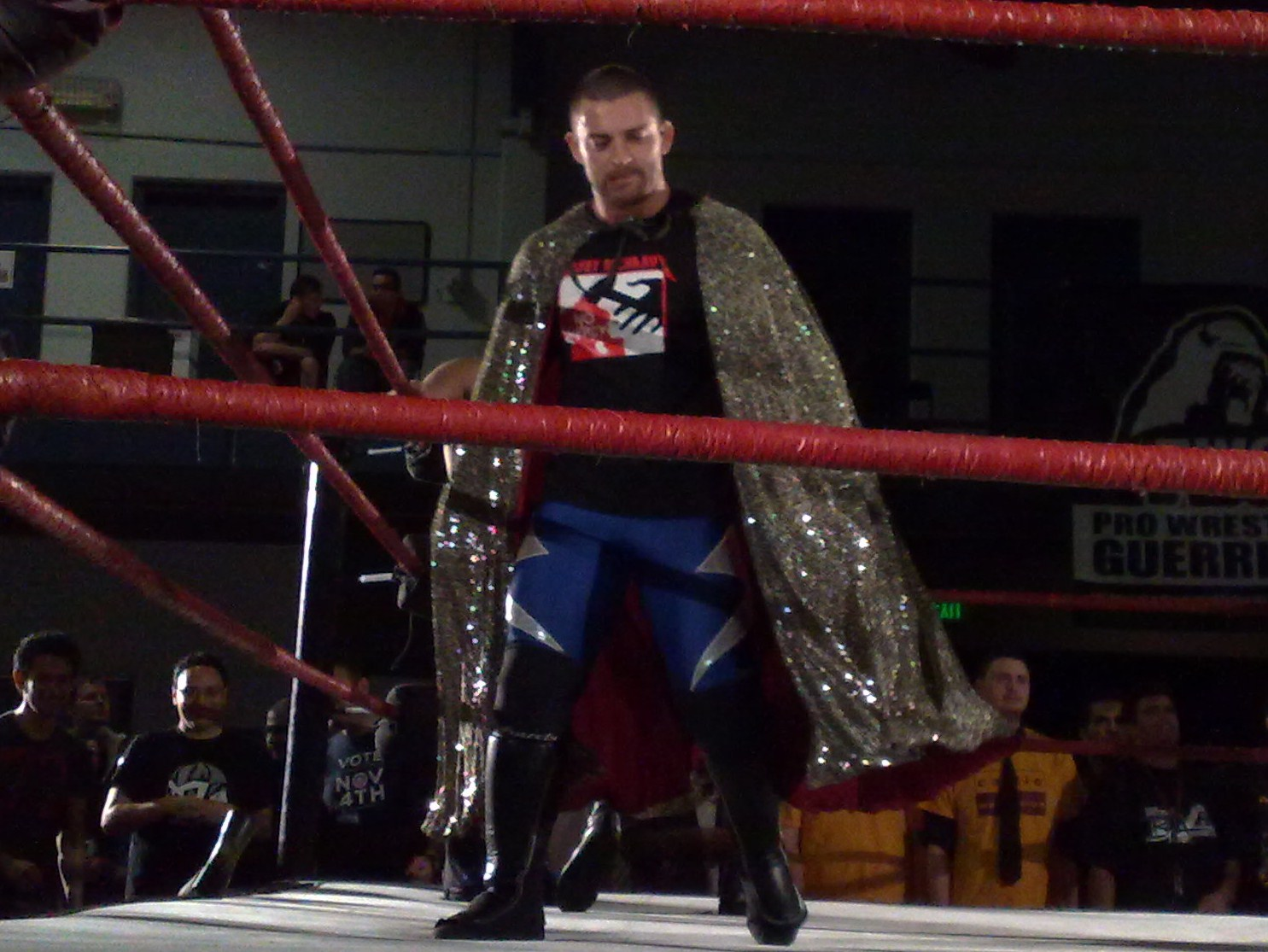
Richards mocking Generico by wearing his cape at PWG's Battle of Los Angeles in November 2008

In April 2005, he began wrestling for Pro Wrestling Guerrilla (PWG) in California; he debuted in an eight-man tag match for the first All Star Weekend. He later returned for a three-way match with Human Tornado and Puma; during the match Richards established himself as a villain by removing Puma's mask and revealing him as T. J. Perkins, starting a rivalry between the two. Richards then began to work more extensively in tag team matches with his new partner, Super Dragon; the two managed to win the PWG World Tag Team Championship from El Generico and Tornado, which led to a seven-month reign, defeating a variety of teams before losing the championship to Chris Bosh and Scott Lost in May of the following year. Following the loss, Richards entered singles competition to be in the company's annual Battle of Los Angeles tournament by defeating, Ronin, Austin Aries, Roderick Strong, and finally Cima, a guest from Japan's Dragon Gate promotion, in the finals.

Richards went back to tag team competition to win the tag championship for a second time with Strong defeating B-Boy and former partner, Super Dragon, only to lose the belts back to their former champions the following night. Richards spent his time with PWG in a number of singles matches until the fall of 2007 at European Vacation II, he and Dragon reunited to defeat rivals Kevin Steen and El Generico. The two held the championship until January 2008 when Richards no-showed the Pearl Habra show; this resulted in the team being stripped of the championship, and led to a sixty-day suspension for Richards. He returned to the company sixty days later, competing in the Dynamite Duumvirate Tag Team Title Tournament, once again teaming up with Super Dragon. After they were eliminated in the first round by the team of Steen and Generico, Dragon took time off due to a shoulder injury, and Richards returned to singles competition. Richards defeated Kenny Omega on February 27, 2010, at As the Worm Turns to win the PWG World Championship for the first time. On September 13, 2010, Richards was stripped of the title, when he was unable to defend it due to other booking commitments.

Richards returned to PWG during the WrestleReunion 5 weekend on January 29, 2011, in a match, where he defeated by Low Ki. On March 4, Richards and Eddie Edwards entered the DDT4 tag team tournament, where they made it to the semifinals before losing to eventual tournament winners, The Young Bucks (Matt and Nick Jackson). In his next PWG appearance on September 10, Richards unsuccessfully challenged Kevin Steen for the PWG World Championship. During December 2013's All Star Weekend X, Richards announced it would be his final weekend with the promotion. On December 21, Richards was defeated by Ricochet in his PWG farewell match.

=== Ring of Honor (2006–2013) ===
==== Kenta's protégé (2006–2007) ====
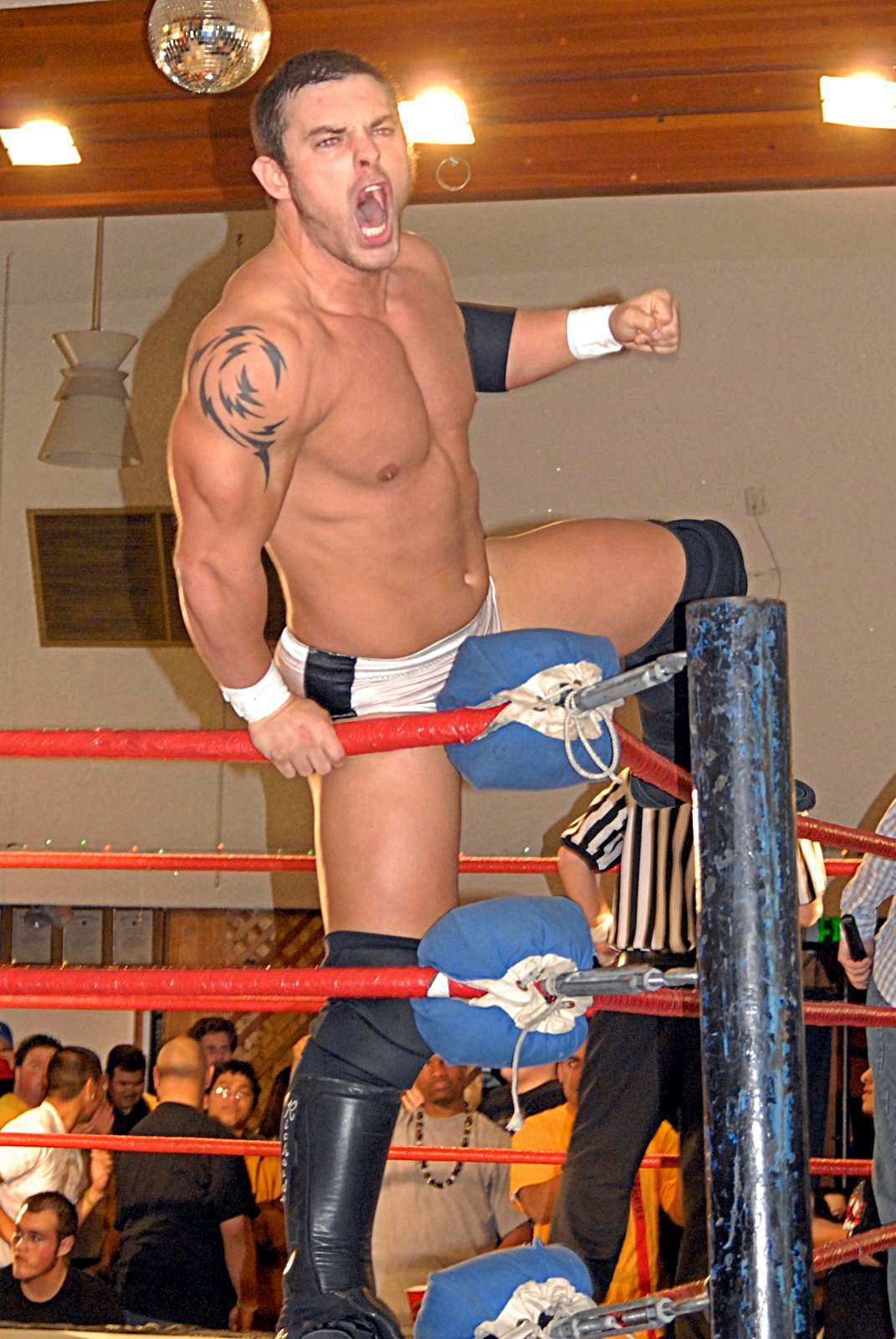
Richards at an PWG event in 2006

On June 3, 2006, Richards made his debut with Ring of Honor (ROH) at Destiny by defeating Jimmy Rave. This was the start of a rivalry with Rave, who challenged Richards to a rematch at In Your Face on June 17. During the match, the pre-match ritual of fans throwing toilet paper at Rave backfired when one roll hit the chandelier above the ring, breaking some glass that scattered in the ring. Nevertheless, the two wrestled on that glass, resulting in numerous cuts on both men's bodies, and Richards went on to win the rematch.

Soon after, Richards was chosen as the American protégé of Kenta, a junior heavyweight from the Japanese promotion Pro Wrestling Noah, who was on loan to the company as part of the talent exchange agreement between the two, the Global Professional Wrestling Alliance. On August 4, the two teamed together to face the Briscoe Brothers with Richards ending up getting pinned. The next night, Richards faced his mentor in a singles match at Fight of the Century; he was unable to secure a victory. Later in the year, Richards and KENTA lost to Roderick Strong and Austin Aries at Honor Reclaims Boston.

==== No Remorse Corps (2007–2008) ====
In early 2007, Richards helped Roderick Strong turn on Strong's former Generation Next partner Austin Aries. Together, Richards and Strong formed the No Remorse Corps, a contingency out to hinder Aries' endeavors; the pair was later joined by Rocky Romero. The No Remorse Corps was involved in a feud with Aries's faction The Resilience. In early 2008, Richards and Romero won the ROH World Tag Team Championship from The Age of the Fall (Jimmy Jacobs and Tyler Black), which led to a four-month reign before losing to the Briscoe Brothers. Following a victory of Strong over rival Erick Stevens, Richards himself turned on his mentor after revealing his allegiance to Larry Sweeney and his group, Sweet 'n' Sour, Inc. This was followed by Strong attempting to gain a measure of revenge before Richards won a match between the two.

==== The American Wolves (2008–2010) ====
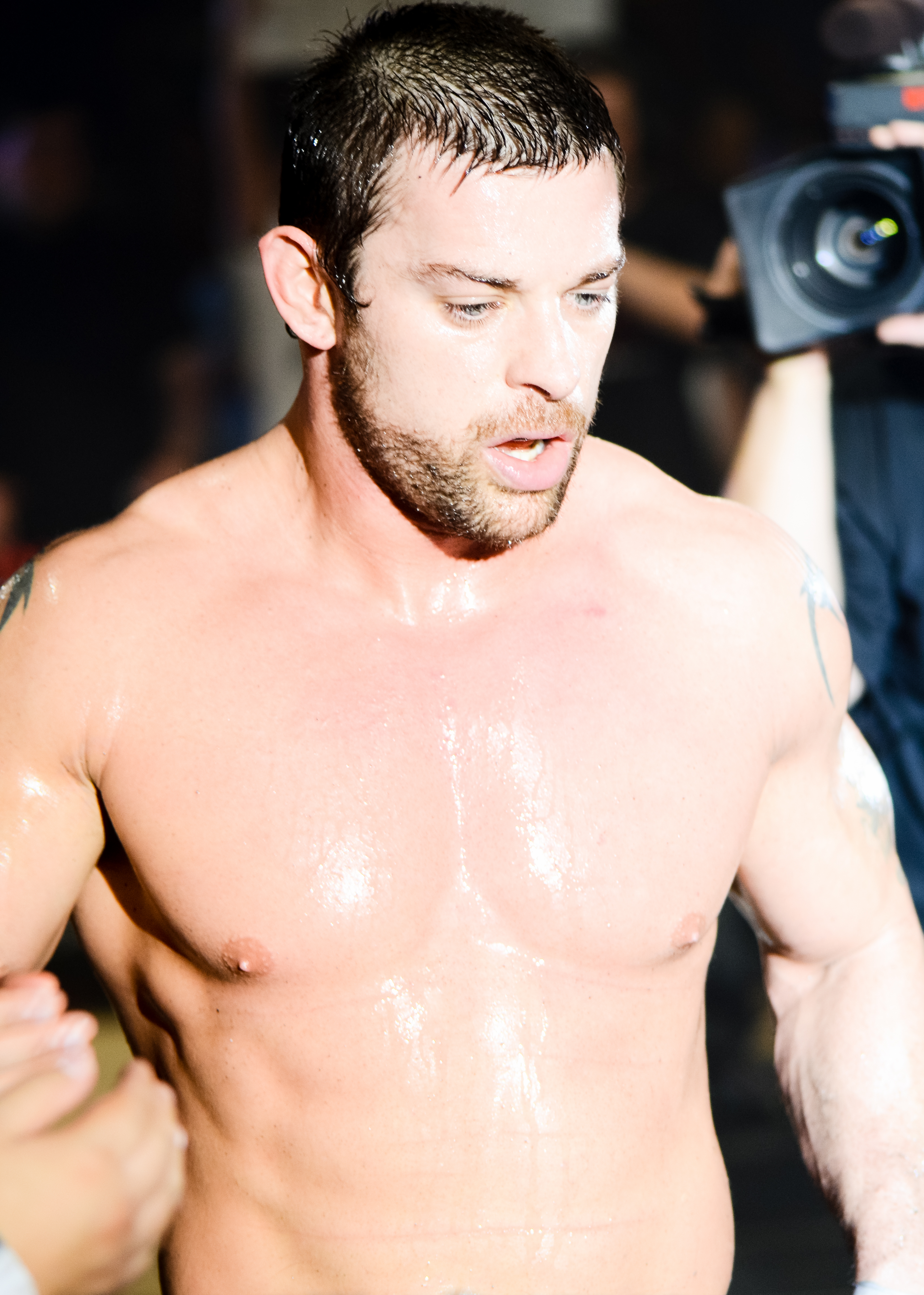
Richards making in the ring in 2011

It was announced by Sweeney on the ROH Newswire that he would team up Richards and Eddie Edwards to create The American Wolves. The Wolves would first team in a triple threat tag team elimination match at All-Star Extravaganza IV against the Briscoes and the unofficial European Union (Claudio Castagnoli and Nigel McGuinness). They eliminated the European Union but ultimately were defeated by the Briscoes. Later that night, Richards attacked Kevin Steen's knee with a pipe. The next night at Final Battle 2008 they teamed with Go Shiozaki against Brent Albright, Erick Stevens and Roderick Strong in a losing effort. They later attacked the Briscoes, attacking the already injured Mark Briscoe's knee putting him out of action. Kevin Steen and El Generico tried to make the save, but were laid out by the Wolves.

Beginning in 2009, after defeating Strong twice with different tag partners The Wolves gained their first World Tag Team Championship match against Steen and Generico at Motor City Madness, where they were defeated. Richards went on to face ROH World Championship contender Tyler Black in a losing effort at Proving Ground Night 1. At Proving Ground Night 2, Richards lost to Steen in a singles match and after the show, he attacked Generico's knee with a chair. At Stylin' & Profilin', The American Wolves and Chris Hero defeated Steen, Generico and Bobby Dempsey, which granted the Wolves another title shot. Before their tag team title shot in New York City, Richards was hand picked by ROH World Champion Nigel McGuinness to be his tag team partner in a match against Generico and Kenta, but Richards and McGuinness lost the match. Richards faced his former mentor Kenta in a GHC Junior Heavyweight Championship match, which took place at Supercard of Honor IV in Houston. Despite losing, Richards received a standing ovation at the end of the match. As the American Wolves gained contendership for the ROH World Tag Team Championship, they lost their initial match against Steen and Generico, but the Wolves attacked Steen before putting Generico through a table.

On April 10 at a television taping of Ring of Honor Wrestling, The American Wolves were able to capture the World Tag Team Championship from Steen and Generico in a Tables are Legal match. At Tag Title Classic, the Wolves took on the team of Bryan Danielson and Tyler Black. The match ended in 45-minute time-limit draw, the first time in ROH history that a World Tag Team Championship match had ended in a time-limit draw. The next weekend, Richards defeated Kevin Steen in a singles match, before he and Edwards defeated Steen and Jay Briscoe in a two out of three falls match to retain the World Tag Team Championship.

In September 2009, Richards defeated Bryan Danielson in Danielson's penultimate match. The next night, at Glory By Honor VIII: The Final Countdown in New York, NY, Richards and Edwards retained the title against Steen and Generico in Ladder War II. On November 13, Richards faced Austin Aries for the ROH World Championship in a losing effort. On December 19, at Final Battle 2009, the Wolves lost the Tag Team Championship to the Briscoe Brothers.

On January 29, 2010, ROH announced that Richards had signed a contract renewal with the company. On February 5 at the Ring of Honor Wrestling tapings, Richards entered the tournament to determine the inaugural ROH World Television Champion and defeated Delirious to advance to the second round, where he would meet Kenny King. The tournament concluded on March 5, when Richards defeated King to advance to the finals, where he was defeated by his American Wolves tag team partner Eddie Edwards. On April 3, Richards earned the number five spot in the Pick 6 series by defeating Kenny King at The Big Bang! pay-per-view.

==== World Champion (2010–2012) ====
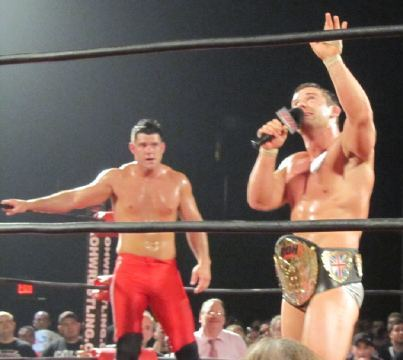
Richards won the ROH World Championship from his tag team partner Eddie Edwards at Best in the World 2011

On June 19 at Death Before Dishonor VIII Richards received a shot at Tyler Black's ROH World Championship, but was unable to dethrone the defending champion. At the Ring of Honor Wrestling television tapings on July 16, Richards lost to Roderick Strong in a match where Strong's guaranteed championship match was on the line. Richards refused assistance from Shane Hagadorn, his manager, during the match, and attacked Hagadorn afterwards when Hagadorn claimed credit for making Richards the best wrestler in the world, ending their association. On September 11, 2010, at Glory By Honor IX, Jim Cornette announced that Richards had signed a new contract with Ring of Honor. At the following pay-per-view, Final Battle 2010 on December 18, Richards unsuccessfully challenged Roderick Strong for the ROH World Championship. On June 26, 2011, at Best in the World 2011, Richards defeated his own tag team partner Eddie Edwards to win the ROH World Championship for the first time. On August 10 ROH announced that Richards had signed a contract extension with the promotion. At Final Battle 2011, Richards successfully defended the championship against Edwards.

At the January 7, 2012, tapings of Ring of Honor Wrestling, Richards formed Team Ambition with Kyle O'Reilly, opposite Eddie Edwards and Adam Cole. Outside of ROH, the team also came to include Tony Kozina. On March 4 at the 10th Anniversary Show, Team Ambition was defeated by Edwards and Cole in a main event tag team match, with Cole pinning Richards for the win. During the Showdown in the Sun weekend on March 30 and 31, Richards first successfully defended the ROH World Championship in a three-way elimination match against Eddie Edwards and Roderick Strong and then in a singles match against Michael Elgin. On May 12 at Border Wars, Richards lost the ROH World Championship to Kevin Steen, ending his reign at 321 days. On June 24 at Best in the World 2012: Hostage Crisis, Richards received his final shot at the ROH World Championship as long as Steen was champion, but was unsuccessful in his attempt to regain the title.

==== American Wolves reunion (2012–2013) ====
On December 16 at Final Battle 2012: Doomsday, Richards reunited with Eddie Edwards in a tag team match, where they defeated Bobby Fish and Kyle O'Reilly. Following their win, the American Wolves received a shot at the ROH World Tag Team Championship, but were defeated by the defending champions, the Briscoe Brothers, on January 18, 2013. On August 3, the American Wolves defeated the Forever Hooligans (Alex Koslov and Rocky Romero) to win the ROH World Tag Team Championship for the second time. They lost the title to reDRagon (Bobby Fish and Kyle O'Reilly) on August 17. On September 20 at Death Before Dishonor XI, the American Wolves unsuccessfully challenged the Forever Hooligans for the IWGP Junior Heavyweight Tag Team Championship. On November 30, Richards announced that he had parted ways with ROH. ROH later claimed that the promotion had decided to part ways with Richards due to his "unprofessionalism and unreliability with the company".

=== New Japan Pro-Wrestling (2010–2012) ===
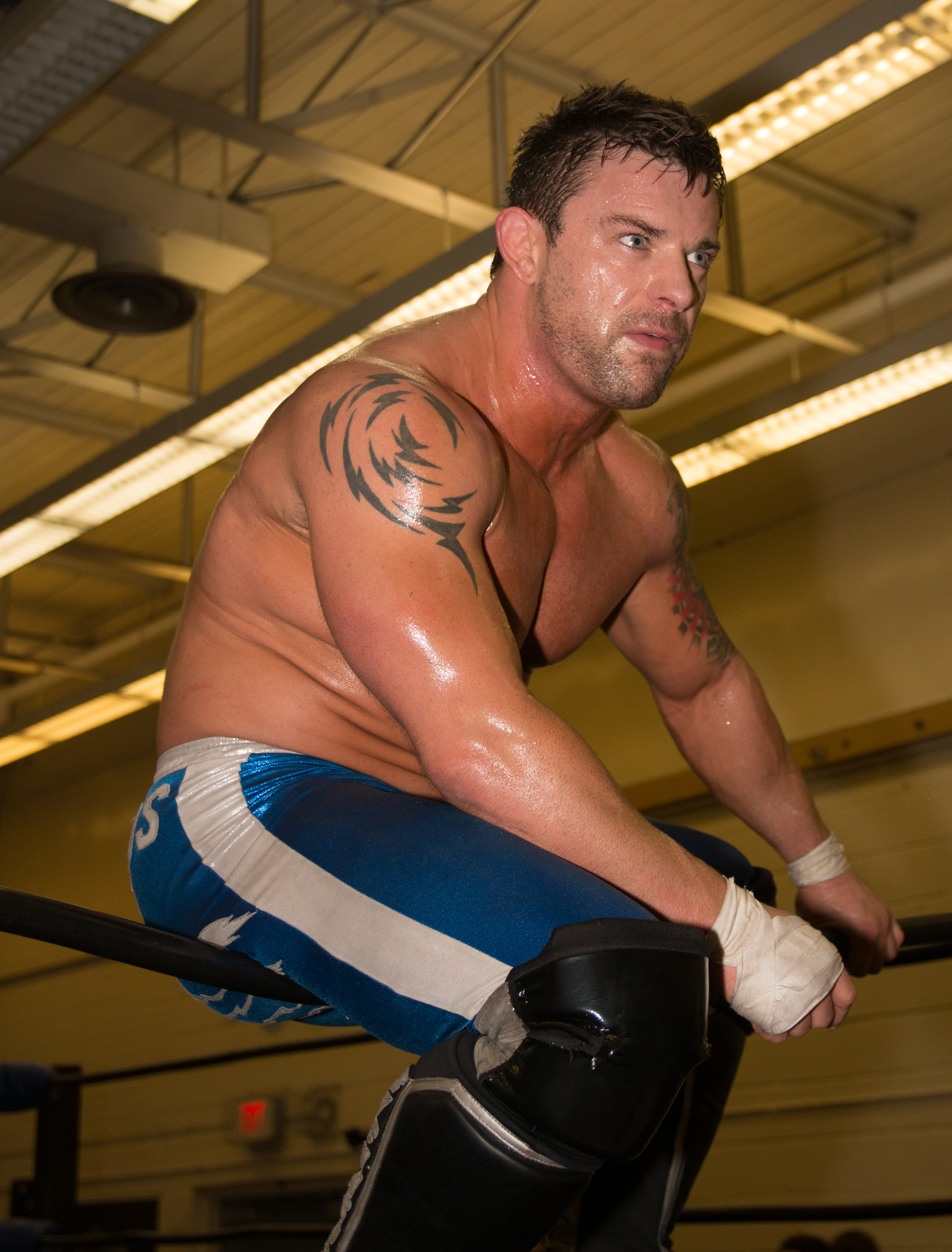
Richards reacting post-match at a Smash Wrestling show in April 2015

In 2010 Richards was invited to take part in New Japan Pro-Wrestling's Best of the Super Juniors tournament along with fellow North American and ROH wrestler, Kenny Omega. Richards entered the two-week-long tournament on May 30, but although he managed to win five out of his seven matches, he finished third in his block and narrowly missed advancing to the semifinals of the tournament. After the tournament Richards began working regularly for New Japan Pro-Wrestling, joining the promotion's top heel stable Chaos, and no longer made appearances for Pro Wrestling Noah. In November 2010 Richards and Rocky Romero, reviving the No Remorse Corps name, made it to the finals of a five-day-long Super J Tag League tournament, before being defeated by their Chaos teammates Jado and Gedo. On December 11, 2010, Richards received a shot at the IWGP Junior Heavyweight Championship, but was defeated by the defending champion, Prince Devitt. On May 3, 2011, Richards and Romero unsuccessfully challenged Devitt and Ryusuke Taguchi, known collectively as Apollo 55, for the IWGP Junior Heavyweight Tag Team Championship. On May 26, Richards entered the 2011 Best of the Super Juniors tournament and after winning six out of his eight round robin stage matches, which included a win over the reigning IWGP Junior Heavyweight Champion Prince Devitt, Richards finished second in his block and advanced to the semifinals of the tournament. On June 10, Richards was eliminated from the tournament in the semifinals by the eventual winner of the entire tournament, Kota Ibushi. On October 10, 2011, at Destruction '11, Richards and Romero defeated Prince Devitt and Ryusuke Taguchi to win the IWGP Junior Heavyweight Tag Team Championship for the first time. Richards and Romero made their first successful title defense on November 12 at Power Struggle, defeating the team of Kushida and Tiger Mask. As a result of pinning Prince Devitt in the IWGP Junior Heavyweight Tag Team Championship match, Richards was granted another shot at his IWGP Junior Heavyweight Championship on December 4, but failed in his attempt to become a double champion. On January 4, 2012, at Wrestle Kingdom VI in Tokyo Dome, Richards and Romero lost the IWGP Junior Heavyweight Tag Team Championship back to Devitt and Taguchi. On February 12 at The New Beginning, the No Remorse Corps defeated Apollo 55 to regain the IWGP Junior Heavyweight Tag Team Championship. As a result, Richards received his third shot at the IWGP Junior Heavyweight Championship on March 10, but was yet again defeated by Prince Devitt. On May 2, Richards and Romero were stripped of the IWGP Junior Heavyweight Tag Team Championship, after a car accident forced Richards to miss his flight to Japan and the following day's Wrestling Dontaku 2012 event, where the two were scheduled to defend the title against Jushin Thunder Liger and Tiger Mask. Despite being able to wrestle in the United States, New Japan also pulled Richards from the 2012 Best of the Super Juniors tournament, citing doctor's orders.

=== Other promotions (2007–2013) ===
Richards has also done extensive tours of Japan, debuting in 2007 with Pro Wrestling Noah. He made a tour of the company again the following summer, competing in tag team matches. Richards was scheduled to return to Noah on November 27, 2013, working an entire tour, which would culminate in him challenging Taiji Ishimori for the GHC Junior Heavyweight Championship. However, on November 25, Richards announced that he had suffered a neck injury and would be forced to pull out of the tour.

On April 8, 2006, Richards won the ECWA Super 8 Tournament after defeating Scott Lost, Milano Collection A.T., and Charlie Haas. After winning this tournament, Richards began competing in many different organizations, including NWA Anarchy, Ring of Honor and ROH's sister promotion Full Impact Pro (FIP). On May 2, 2009, Richards defeated Tyler Black via forfeit for the FIP World Heavyweight Championship, his first singles title. While on tour in Japan for Dragon Gate in December 2009, Richards lost the FIP title to Masaaki Mochizuki. He would regain the title a month later at DGUSA Fearless.

Richards has competed twice in German promotion Westside Xtreme Wrestling's (wXw) 16 Carat Gold tournament. While being eliminated from the tournament in his first round match against Go Shiozaki in 2007, Richards made it all the way to the semifinals in 2011, defeating Jon Ryan and Zack Sabre Jr. along the way, before losing to eventual tournament winner, Sami Callihan.

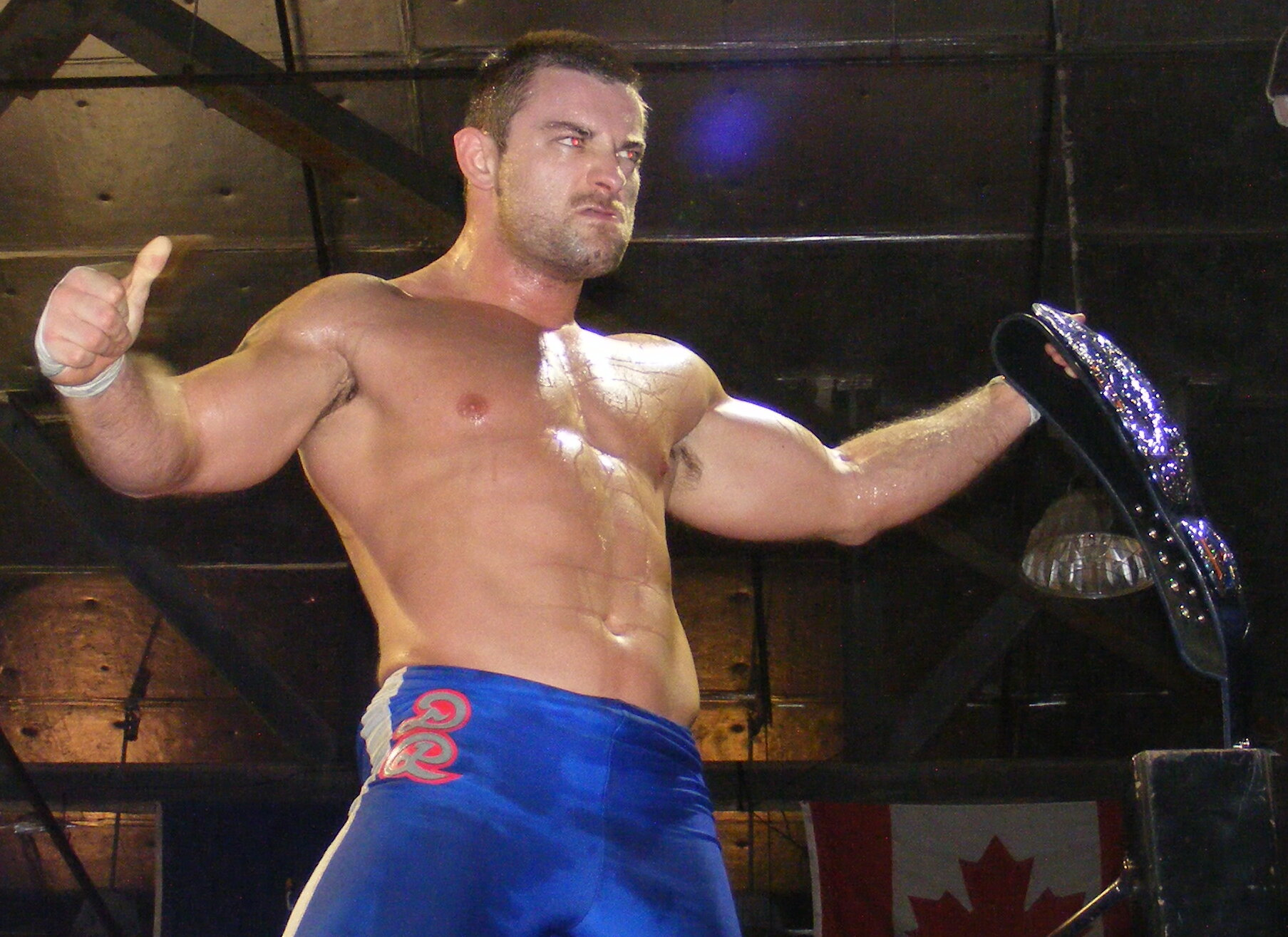
Richards as the 2CW Tag Team Champion in 2010

In mid-2009, Richards began competing for Dragon Gate USA and performed at the promotion's Open the Untouchable Gate show, where he defeated Shingo Takagi. After his match, Bryan Danielson praised Richards and touted him as the best wrestler in the world, but Richards attacked Danielson claiming that he already deserved that title. On November 28, Richards competed in a tournament to determine the inaugural DGUSA Open the Freedom Gate Champion, but lost to Yamato in the first round. After BxB Hulk won the championship later that night, Richards challenged him to a championship match before attacking him. He also began competing for DGUSA's parent promotion, Dragon Gate, and completed a tour with them in December 2009.

In 2009, Richards, along with FIP booker Sal Hamaoui and Dragon Gate USA vice president Gabe Sapolsky founded the company, Evolve, which saw Richards in the main event of the first show, Evolve 1, on January 16 in the following year, defeating Kota Ibushi. On January 29, 2010, it was announced that Richards will no longer be involved with either Dragon Gate USA or Evolve because he signed a new contract with ROH. On March 22 Richards was stripped of the FIP World Heavyweight Championship and will not be wrestling for that company in the future either. Following his departure from ROH, Richards returned to Evolve on January 10, 2014, unsuccessfully challenging A. R. Fox for the Evolve Championship.

On April 2, 2010, the American Wolves traveled to Squared Circle Wrestling (2CW) and won the 2CW Tag Team Championship from Cheech and Cloudy in Watertown, New York. They held the title for four months before losing them to Colin Delaney and Jimmy Olsen on August 22, 2010.

From June 30 to July 2, 2012, Richards took part in World Wrestling Council's (WWC) Anniversario weekend in Puerto Rico. On the first two nights, he was defeated in singles matches by Ray Gonzalez and Chris Angel and, on the final night, he and Melina were defeated in a mixed tag team match by Velvet Sky and Xix Savant.

In August 2013, after their contracts with ROH had expired, Richards and Eddie Edwards took part in a tryout camp for WWE, where they were described as "standing out of everyone". On November 18, Richards and Edwards entered the WWE Performance Center in Orlando, Florida, for another week-long tryout. Three days later, Richards and Edwards, working under the ring names Derek Billington and John Cahill, respectively, and billed together as "The American Pitbulls", made their NXT debut, losing to NXT Tag Team Champions The Ascension (Konnor and Viktor) in a non-title match. The following month, Richards announced that his time on the independent circuit was coming to an end, implying that he had signed a developmental contract with WWE.

=== Total Nonstop Action Wrestling / Impact Wrestling (2014–2017) ===
==== World Tag Team Championship reigns (2014–2016) ====
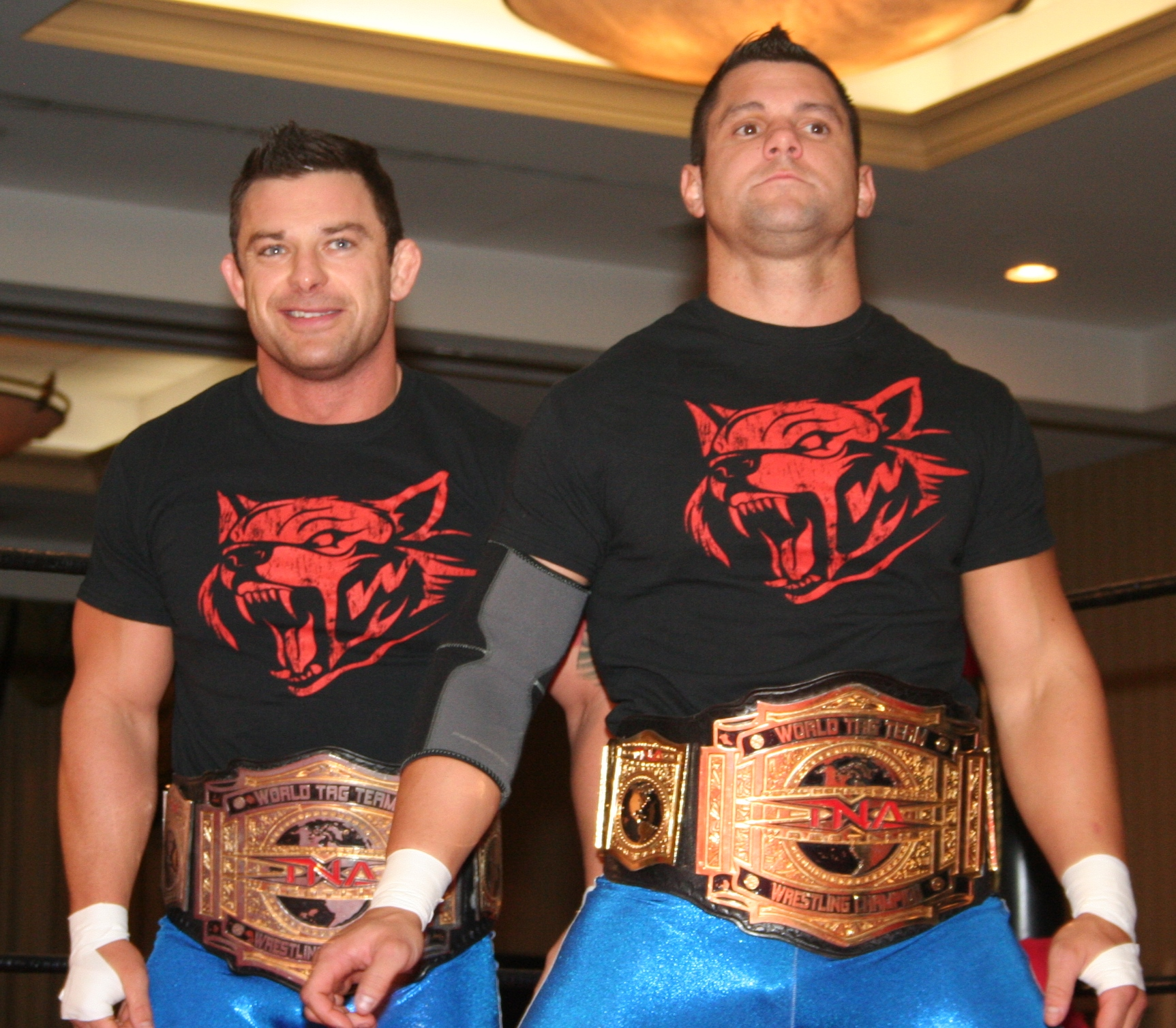
Edwards (right) and Richards as the TNA World Tag Team Champions during their second reign in August 2014.

On the January 16, 2014, episode of Impact Wrestling, Richards made his Total Nonstop Action Wrestling debut alongside his American Wolves teammate Eddie Edwards (now renamed The Wolves), in a segment with TNA President Dixie Carter, where she welcomed them and then offered them a tryout match on the following episode of Impact Wrestling before they informed her that they had already signed contracts with the company, courtesy of the private investor, MVP. On February 23, 2014, he and Eddie won the TNA World Tag Team Champions at a live event in Morgantown, West Virginia. After a week-long reign, The Wolves lost the title back to The BroMans at Wrestle-1's Kaisen: Outbreak event in Tokyo, Japan in a three-way match, which also included Team 246 (Kaz Hayashi and Shuji Kondo).

On April 27 at the Sacrifice pay-per-view, The Wolves regained the championship by defeating Robbie E, Godderz, and DJ Z in a two-on-three handicap match. On June 15, 2014, at Slammiversary XII The Wolves competed in six way ladder match for TNA X Division Championship, which was won by Sanada. On June 26, 2014, the Wolves defeated The Hardy Boyz. The Wolves returned to Wrestle-1 on July 6, successfully defending the TNA World Tag Team Championship against the Junior Stars (Koji Kanemoto and Minoru Tanaka). The Hardys and Team 3D challenged The Wolves to a three-way for the TNA World Tag Team Championship, to which they agreed. Kurt Angle later announced that all three teams would compete in a best of three series for the title with the winners of the first match being able to choose the stipulation of the next one. Team 3D won the first match and chose a Tables match, The Hardys won the second match and chose a ladder match, and The Wolves won the third match at No Surrender, tying them all at one win each. A final match to decide the series took place, and was won by The Wolves. At the Impact Wrestling tapings on September 19, Edwards and Richards lost the titles to The Revolution (James Storm and Abyss). On January 30, 2015, The Wolves defeated The Revolution to become three time World Tag Team Champions. However, The Wolves vacated the titles on March 14 due to Edwards suffering a broken heel.

On their return, The Wolves faced Dirty Heels in a Best of 5 Series matches for the Tag Team Championships. The Wolves won the first 2 matches and Dirty Heels won the next two. At Slammiversary, Aries defeated Richards, so he chose the stipulation for the last match of the series, a 30 minutes tag team iron man match. On June 25, 2015, (aired July 1, 2015) The Wolves defeated Dirty Heels to win the Tag Team Titles. With this victory, The Wolves tied Beer Money for the record of most reigns, with four. They lost the titles to Brian Myers and Trevor Lee on the edition of September 2, 2015, of Impact Wrestling. only to regain them the following week on the September 9, 2015, episode of Impact. During October and November (taped in July), Richards participated in the first ever TNA World Title Series where he ended second of his block by only defeating Robbie E to receive 4 points, surpassing Eddie Edwards record (via time limit draw), but lost to Matt Hardy to retain his status with 4 points of his block. This was enough to advance to the round of 16 where he defeated Bram to advance in the round of 8, in which he would lose to Ethan Carter III, eliminating him from the series.

At One Night Only Live, The Wolves defended their world tag titles in the Three-way tag team match against Kurt Angle and Drew Galloway and Eli Drake and Jessie Godderz which saw the Wolves retain the titles. On the January 26 edition of Impact Wrestling, The Wolves were attacked by the newest stable called The Decay consisting of Abyss, Crazzy Steve and the debuting Rosemary, who stole the titles. However they retained the titles from them on the February 2 episode of Impact Wrestling. the following week, the Wolves challenged Decay to a hardcore Monster's Ball match which is won by the Decay. On the March 8 episode of Impact Wrestling, The Wolves dropped the titles to Beer Money, Inc. (James Storm and Bobby Roode).

==== Feud with Eddie Edwards and departure (2016–2017) ====
In March, Richards suffered an ACL injury and Edwards started his singles run by feuding with TNA X Division Champion Trevor Lee. In July at Destination X, Richards was seen on a TNA broadcast for the first time in months, when he joined Edwards at ringside in a run-in with TNA World Heavyweight Champion Lashley in the build-up to their match later that evening. Richards confirmed on the broadcast that he was there to support Edwards in his landmark match, although was still "A way off being in a condition to compete." Eddie's match resulted in a no-contest when Mike Bennett interfered in the match flooring the referee and then invited new signee to TNA, Moose to the ring, who had a confrontation with Lashley.

On January 5, 2017, Richards made his return to TNA, helping Edwards retain the TNA World Heavyweight Championship, by stopping Lashley from hitting Edwards with the title. Richards faced Lashley on January 6, 2017, at One Night Only: Live in a losing effort. On the February 9 episode of Impact Wrestling, Richards turned heel by costing Edwards the TNA World Heavyweight Championship rematch against Lashley, by pulling the referee out of the ring and hitting Edwards with the title belt while the referee was distracted by Angelina Love. Afterwards, Richards and his wife Angelina Love attacked Edwards and his wife Alisha Edwards, thus ending The Wolves in the process. Richards' character then went through a complete transformation, sporting new theme music, trunks, being infatuated with Love and calling himself "The Lone Wolf". On the February 16 episode of Impact Wrestling, Richards faced Edwards in a Street Fight, however the match ended in a no-contest. On the March 9 episode of Impact Wrestling, Richards brawled with Edwards at the beginning of the show, but the two were separated by security guards. On the April 6 episode of Impact Wrestling, Richards defeated Edwards in a Last Man Standing Match.

On July 24, 2017, Richards officially announced his departure from TNA to become a doctor.

=== Independent circuit (2017) ===
On August 22, 2017, Evolve announced the return of Richards for September 22 and 23, to be part to Evolve 92, where he faced Zack Sabre Jr. for the Evolve Championship, and to Evolve 93, where he faced Keith Lee.

On September 17, 2017, Richards announced he would be undergoing knee surgery, forcing him to cancel his bookings for the rest of the year. On November 4, Richards announced he would be taking all of 2018 off from professional wrestling due to his studies.

=== Major League Wrestling (2021–2023) ===
On March 10, 2021, it was announced by Global Syndicate Wrestling that Richards will be returning to professional wrestling in June.

On June 23, 2022, Richards won the MLW National Openweight Championship by defeating Alex Kane at MLW Pay-per-view Battle Riot IV but on January 7, 2023, his reign as champion came to an end when he was defeated by Johnny Fusion at another MLW Pay-per-view by the name of Blood and Thunder of year 2023.

=== Return to Impact Wrestling (2022) ===
At Slammiversary, on June 19, 2022, Richards returned to Impact Wrestling, teaming with Alex Shelley, Chris Sabin, Frankie Kazarian, and Nick Aldis to defeat Honor No More (Eddie Edwards, Matt Taven, Mike Bennett, PCO, and Vincent).

== Personal life ==
In 2008, Richards married Jennifer, better known as female professional wrestler Christie Summers. In addition to a short-lived career in professional wrestling, Jennifer is also a competitive bodybuilder in the figure class. The couple separated sometime in 2010, leading Richards to reevaluate his retirement plans.

In a June 2010 interview, Richards stated that he planned to quit the wrestling business by the end of the year to concentrate on other areas of his life. However, he later withdrew those plans. Richards is a trained paramedic.

In January 2015, Richards began dating fellow Impact wrestler Lauren Williams, better known as Angelina Love. The couple announced their engagement on April 27, 2015, and were married on June 10, 2015. On July 30, Williams announced on her Twitter account that she and Richards were expecting their first child, a boy named David Vincent Richards, born on March 17, 2016. The couple divorced amicably sometime in 2017 and in 2019 Richards married a woman named Melissa, becoming stepfather to her two children from a previous relationship. He also has a Pug named Marv.

In March 2023, he announced his retirement from professional wrestling amid domestic violence allegations. Richards released a statement through social media denying the allegations. He has stated that no criminal charges have been filed and there is no evidence this incident took place. Richards has stated he was retiring in order to not tarnish the reputations of his coworkers, training team and the wrestling industry as a whole.

== Championships and accomplishments ==
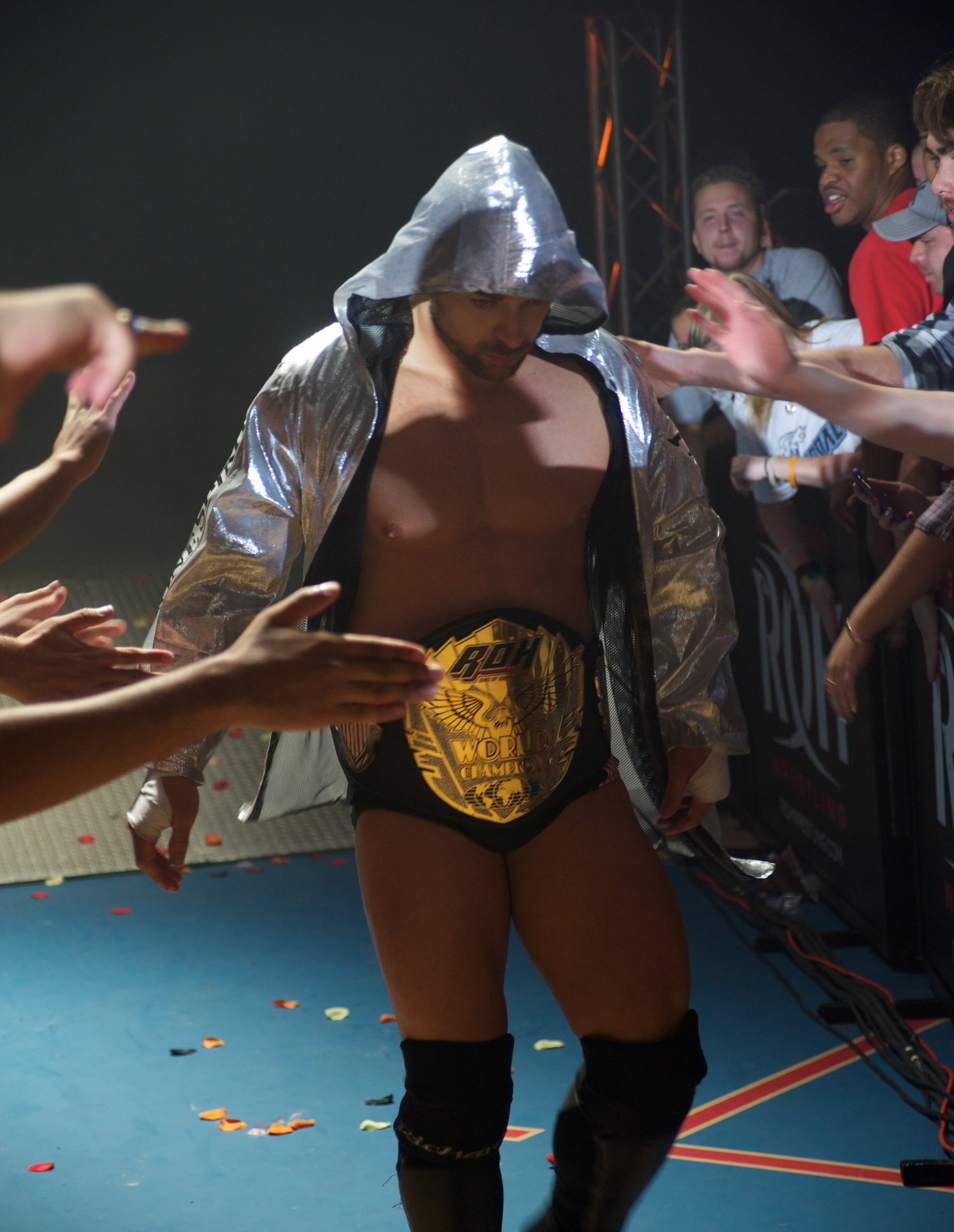
Richards as the ROH World Champion in August 2011

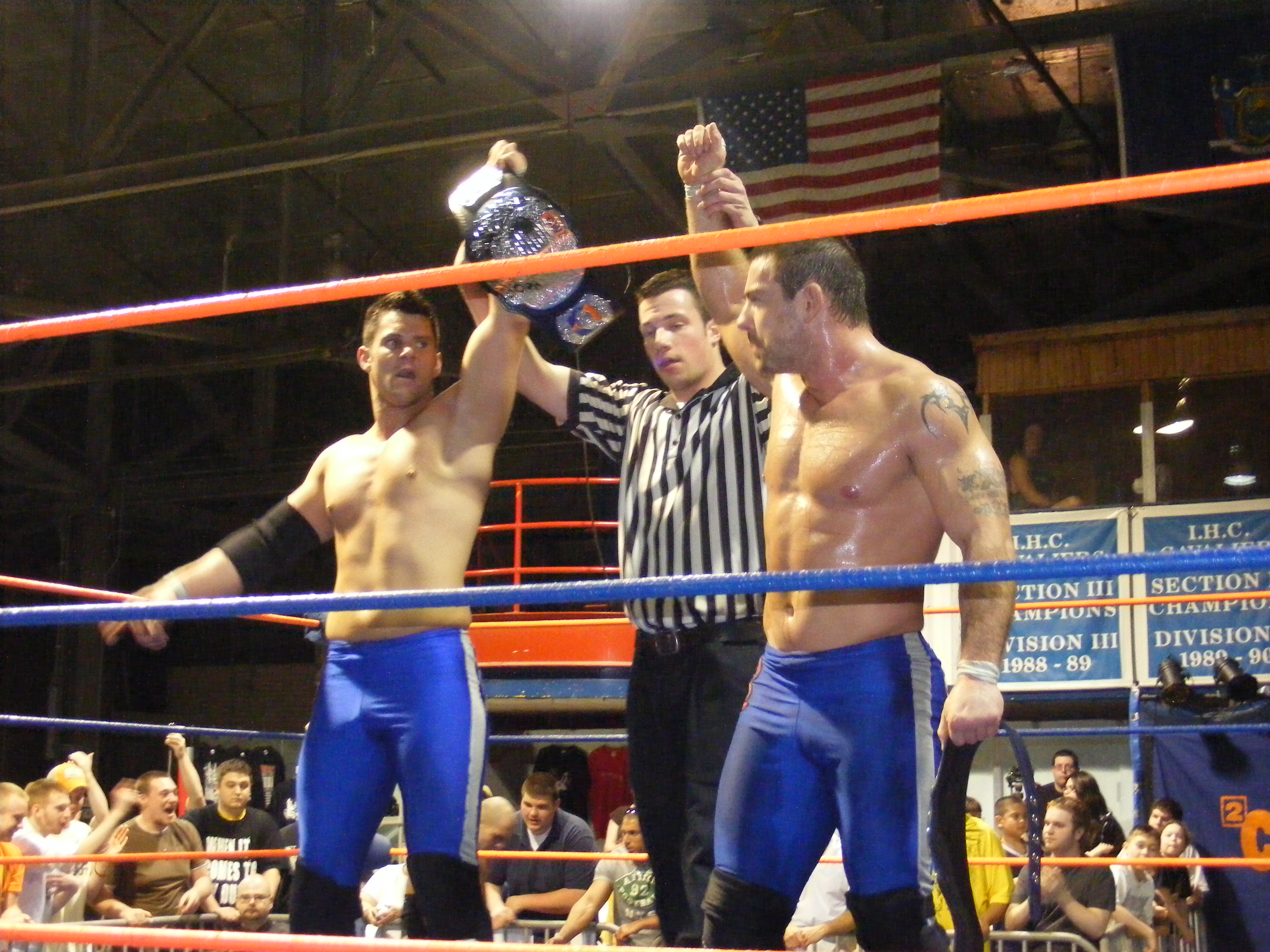
Richards (right) with Eddie Edwards after winning the 2CW Tag Team Championship in April 2010

- 605 Championship Wrestling
  - 605 Championship (1 time)
- All Star Wrestling (West Virginia)
  - ASW Heavyweight Championship (2 times)
- Beyond Wrestling
  - Absolute Challenge Round Robin Tournament (2011)
- Combat Zone Wrestling
  - CZW World Heavyweight Championship (1 time)
- DEFY Wrestling
  - DEFY World Championship (1 time, inaugural)
  - Defy 8xGP Championship Tournament (2017)
- East Coast Wrestling Association
  - 10th Annual ECWA Super 8 Tournament (2006)
- Full Impact Pro
  - FIP World Heavyweight Championship (2 times)
  - Eddie Graham Memorial Battle Of The Belts (2009)
  - Jeff Peterson Memorial Cup (2009)
- Stricktly Nsane Pro Wrestling
  - SNPW Heavyweight Championship (1 time)
- FutureShock Wrestling
  - FSW Championship (1 time)
- Mad Wrestling Association
  - MWA International Heavyweight Championship (1 time)
- Major League Wrestling
  - MLW National Openweight Championship (1 time)
  - MLW Opera Cup (2021)
- New Japan Pro-Wrestling
  - IWGP Junior Heavyweight Tag Team Championship (2 times) – with Rocky Romero
- Prestige Championship Wrestling
  - PCW Heavyweight Championship (1 time)
- Pinnacle Pro Wrestling
  - Pinnacle Tag Team Championship (1 time) – with Tony Kozina
- Pro Wrestling Eclipse
  - PWE Open Weight Championship (1 time)
- Pro Wrestling Element
  - Pro Wrestling Element North American Championship (1 time)
- Pro Wrestling Guerrilla
  - PWG World Championship (1 time)
  - PWG World Tag Team Championship (3 times) – Super Dragon (2) and Roderick Strong (1)
  - Battle of Los Angeles (2006)
- Pro Wrestling Illustrated
  - Ranked No. 7 of the top 500 singles wrestlers in the PWI 500 in 2012
- Pro Wrestling Prestige
  - PWP Tag Team Championship (1 time) – with Kyle O'Reilly
- Ring of Honor
  - ROH World Championship (1 time)
  - ROH World Tag Team Championship (3 times) – with Rocky Romero (1) and Eddie Edwards (2)
- PCW Ultra
  - PCW Ultra Light Heavyweight Championship (1 time)
- SoCal Uncensored
  - Match of the Year (2006) with Super Dragon vs. Roderick Strong and Jack Evans, March 4, Pro Wrestling Guerrilla
- Southside Wrestling Entertainment
  - SWE Speed King Championship (1 time)
- Squared Circle Wrestling
  - 2CW Tag Team Championship (1 time) – with Eddie Edwards
- The Wrestling Revolver
  - Revolver World Tag Team Championship (1 time) – with Eddie Edwards
- Total Nonstop Action Wrestling
  - TNA World Tag Team Championship (5 times) – with Eddie Edwards
  - TNA World Cup (2015) – with Jeff Hardy, Gunner, Gail Kim, Rockstar Spud and Crazzy Steve
- Top Ranked Wrestling
  - TRW Cruiserweight Championship (1 time)
- Wrestling Observer Newsletter
  - Most Outstanding Wrestler (2011)
  - Tag Team of the Year (2009) with Eddie Edwards
- World Power Wrestling
  - Best Of The West (2005)
- Wrestling Superstar
  - Wrestling Superstar Tag Team Championship (1 time) – with Eddie Edwards
