= Hawthorne Theatre =

Historic building and music venue in Portland, Oregon, U.S.

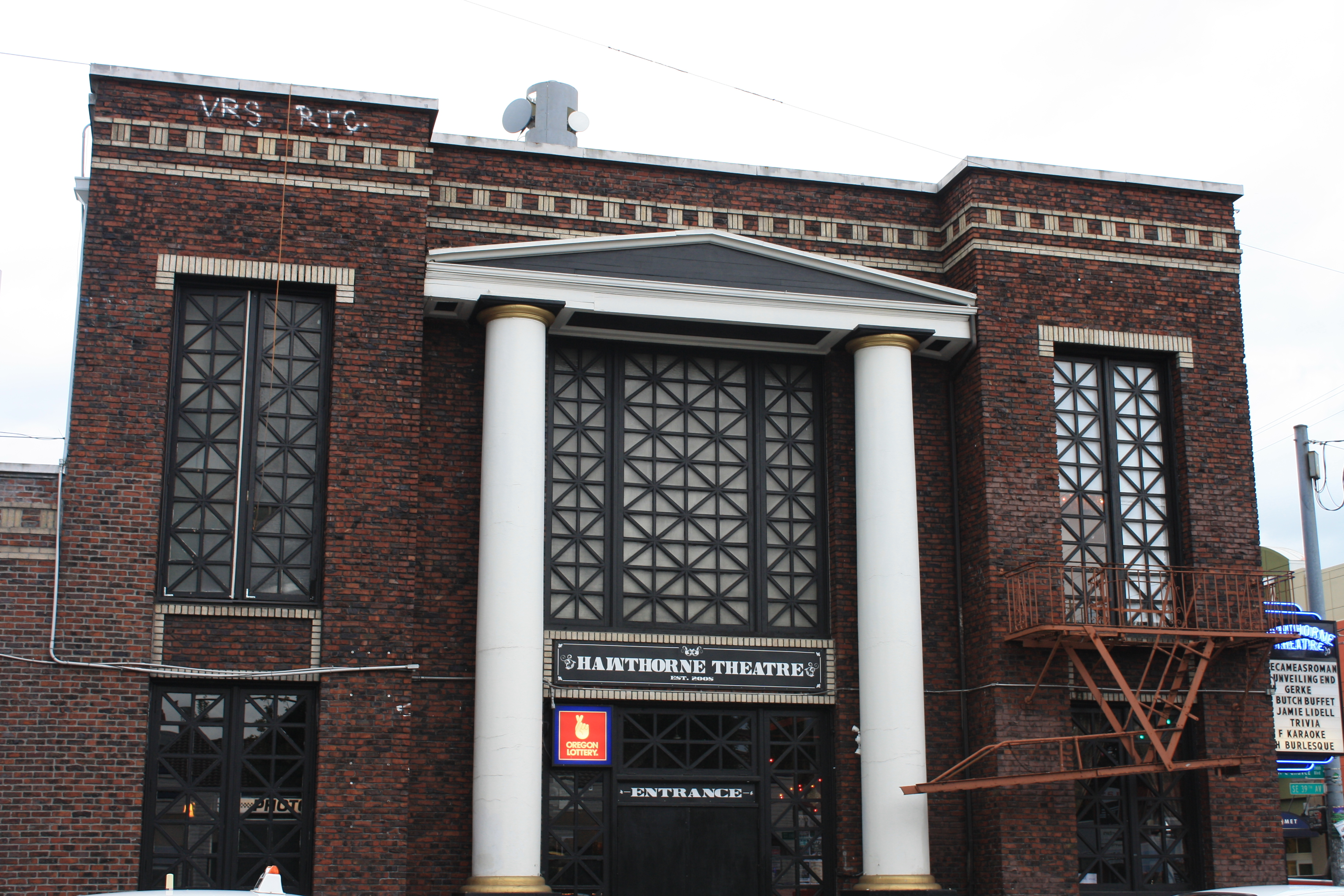
- Exterior view, 2010

- Location within Portland, Oregon

General information
- Location: 1507 SE 39th Ave, Portland, Oregon, United States
- Coordinates: 45.51178°N 122.62312°W

The Hawthorne Theatre, formerly the Sunnyside Masonic Lodge, is an historic building and music venue located in Portland, Oregon's Hawthorne District. The building was completed in 1919, and formerly housed the restaurant Lucky Strike, as well as Conan's, a bar and music venue. It sold for approximately $2 million in 2005 and $3 million in 2013.

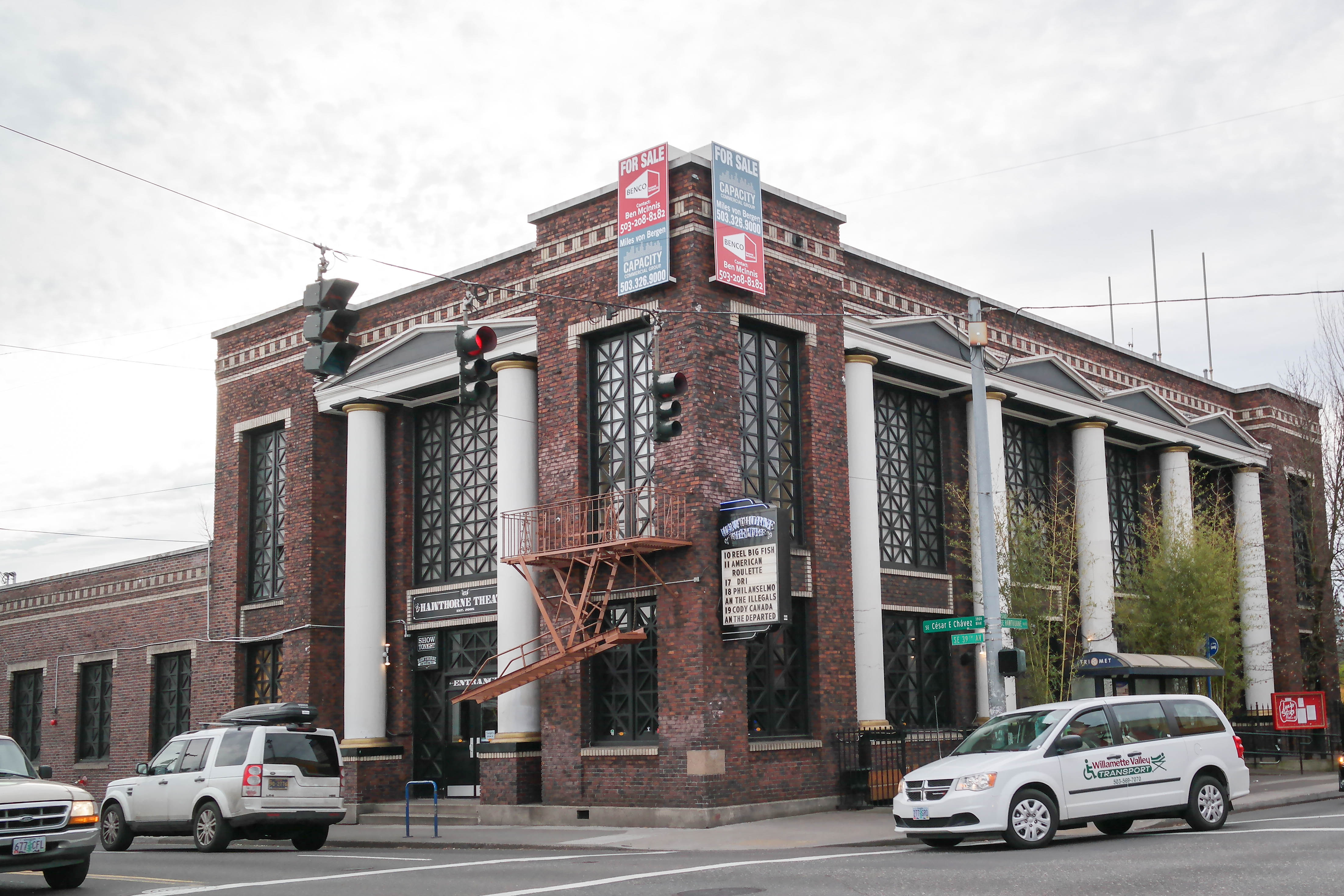
The building's exterior in 2014

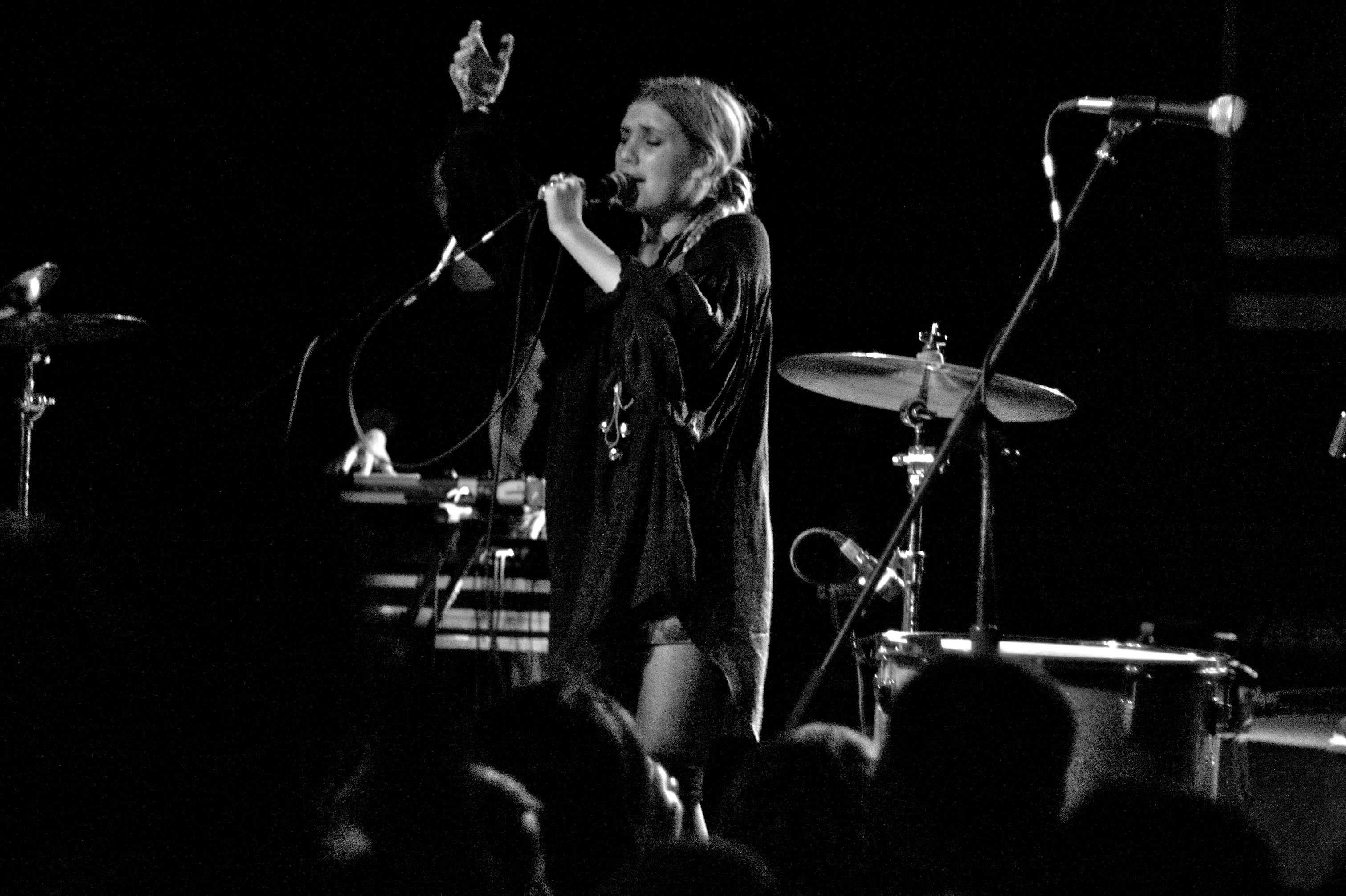
Lykke Li plays the Hawthorne Theatre in 2009.

== See also ==
- Culture of Portland, Oregon
- Mark Building, another former Masonic building in Portland
