= Roseland Theater =

Music venue in Portland, Oregon, U.S.

- Starry Night (1982–1991)

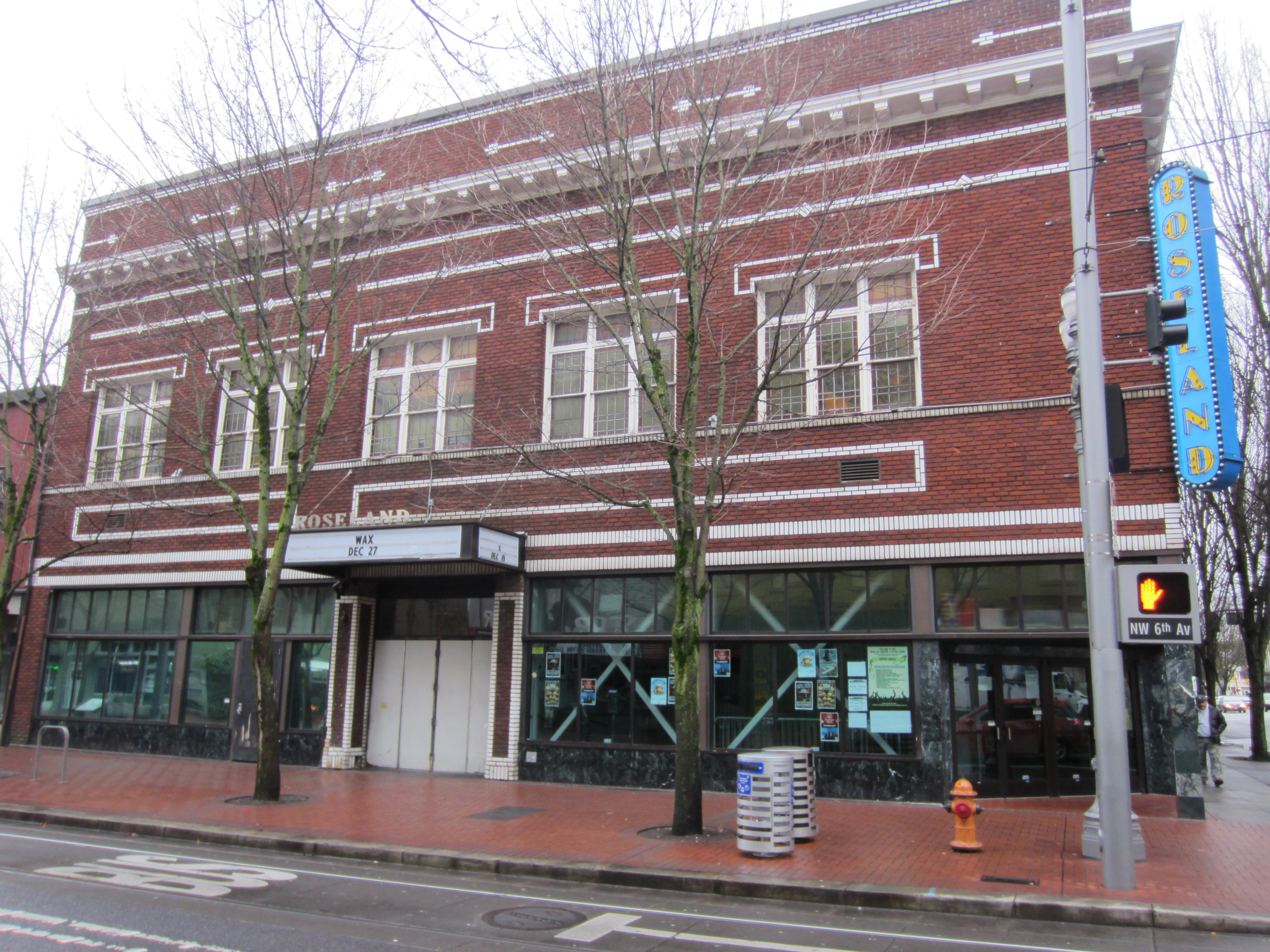
- The music venue in 2014

- Location in Portland, Oregon
- Address: 8 Northwest 6th Avenue; Portland, Oregon; United States
- Coordinates: 45.5233°N 122.67615°W
- Owner: Larry Hurwitz (1982–1991), Oregon Theater Management (1991–1996), David Leiken / Double Tee (1996–present)
- Operator: Double Tee
- Capacity: 1,400
- Type: Music venue

Construction
- Opened: 1982
- Reopened: 1991

Website
- roselandpdx.com

The Roseland Theater, sometimes called the Roseland Theater and Grill, is a music venue located at 8 Northwest Sixth Avenue in the Old Town Chinatown neighborhood of Portland, Oregon, in the United States. The building was originally a church, constructed by the Apostolic Faith Church in 1922. In 1982, Larry Hurwitz converted the building to a music venue called Starry Night. In 1990, the club's 21-year-old publicity agent was murdered in one of the theater's hallways; Hurwitz was convicted for this murder ten years later. Hurwitz sold the club in 1991, claiming he had lost support from the local music industry. The venue was given its current name during the 1991 ownership transfer. During the 1990s, Double Tee acquired control of the hall's operations, then purchased and renovated the building.

The theater features a standing-only main floor and an upstairs balcony with an adjacent bar. Peter's Room, an intimate showcase venue with a 400-person capacity, includes a restaurant and bar. Roseland has been named "Best Haunted Venue" by one local publication, referring to the 1990 murder. The venue is known for hosting a variety of music acts and for its good acoustics.

== History ==
=== Apostolic Faith Church ===
The Apostolic Faith Church bought the property at 8 Northwest Sixth Avenue from the A. Meier estate in 1922 and immediately began constructing a two-story building at the site. To make way for the new structure, church members first razed an older building that had housed a saloon at that address. The new building was finished in August 1922.

Made of brick and constructed entirely with donated labor, the structure had a footprint of 100 by 100 feet (30 by 30 m) next to a 60-by-100-foot (18 by 30 m) parking lot. The lower floor contained 11 storerooms, some of which were rented to others, a printing room, the church headquarters, and a small chapel with a seating capacity of 200. The upper floor consisted of a large meeting hall that could seat 1,150 people. The meeting hall was designed partly with music in mind. Its raised platform held up to 70 people, including a 40-piece orchestra and male and mixed quartets that performed during church services. The church sold the building in 1981. A neon sign reading "Jesus, the Light of the World", hung on the building but was removed in 1981.

=== Starry Night ===
Larry Hurwitz owned and operated the Starry Night nightclub in the building from 1982 through 1991. The venue had a capacity of less than 1,000 people. In the 1980s, the Starry Night hosted musical acts including Animotion, Nu Shooz, and the Crazy 8s. Hurwitz sold the Starry Night in February 1991, claiming he had "lost the support of the local music industry". The transfer in ownership resulted in a name change to Roseland Theater. In 1992, Roseland's manager for the new owners, Oregon Theater Management, said the name was changed to disassociate from Hurwitz's business and reputation.

==== Murder of Starry Night employee ====
In 2000, Hurwitz was convicted of the murder 10 years earlier of the Starry Night's 21-year-old publicity agent, Timothy Moreau, to keep Moreau from alerting authorities to a counterfeit ticket scam at the club. Another club employee, George Castagnola, pleaded guilty to helping Hurwitz kill Moreau. Moreau was strangled in the theater after a John Lee Hooker concert. After selling the club, Hurwitz moved to Vietnam, but in 1997 a federal grand jury indicted him on charges of tax evasion related to the scam. Extradited to the United States and pleading guilty to the tax evasion charges, he was sentenced to a year in federal prison. Publicity generated by the tax-evasion trial led to new information about the murder. Hurwitz was sentenced to 11 years in prison after pleading no contest to one count of murder in 2000, and released in 2008 after serving between 7 and 8 years. Meanwhile, to settle a civil wrongful-death suit filed against him by Moreau's parents, Hurwitz in 2001 stipulated to his part in the murder, agreed that a jury would have found him guilty if he had not pleaded "no contest", and agreed to pay the Moreau family US$3 million in damages. The details of the case were reported in a 23-part series in the newspaper PDXS during the 1990s.

=== Roseland Theater ===
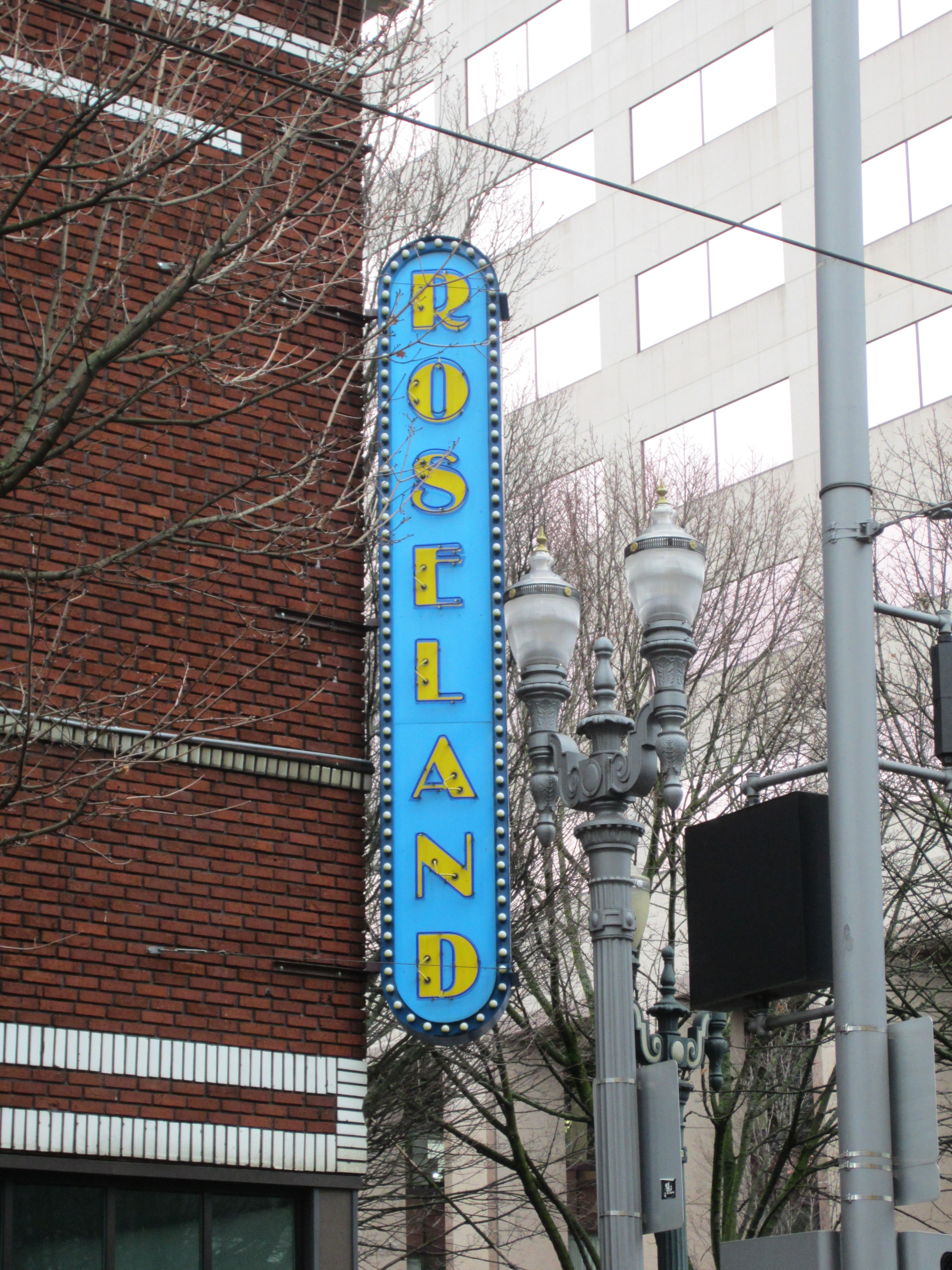
Marquee at the intersection of Northwest Sixth Avenue and West Burnside Street in 2014

In 1991, Double Tee Promotions acquired control of Roseland's operations. In December 1995, The Oregonian reported that the company and its president, David Leiken, would be purchasing and renovating the building over several months. Leiken founded Double Tee, which produces events throughout the Pacific Northwest and continues to manage Roseland, in 1972. The project, which included purchase of the building, new lounges and restrooms, and a ventilation system, was estimated to cost between $1.75 million and $2 million. The size of the street-level floor would also increased to accommodate an additional 350–440 guests, replacing a small club called the Garden. The renovation project ended in 1997; Leiken updated the building's facade and opened a nightclub and sports bar on the lower level. Roseland remained open during the renovation, which reportedly cost around $2.5 million.

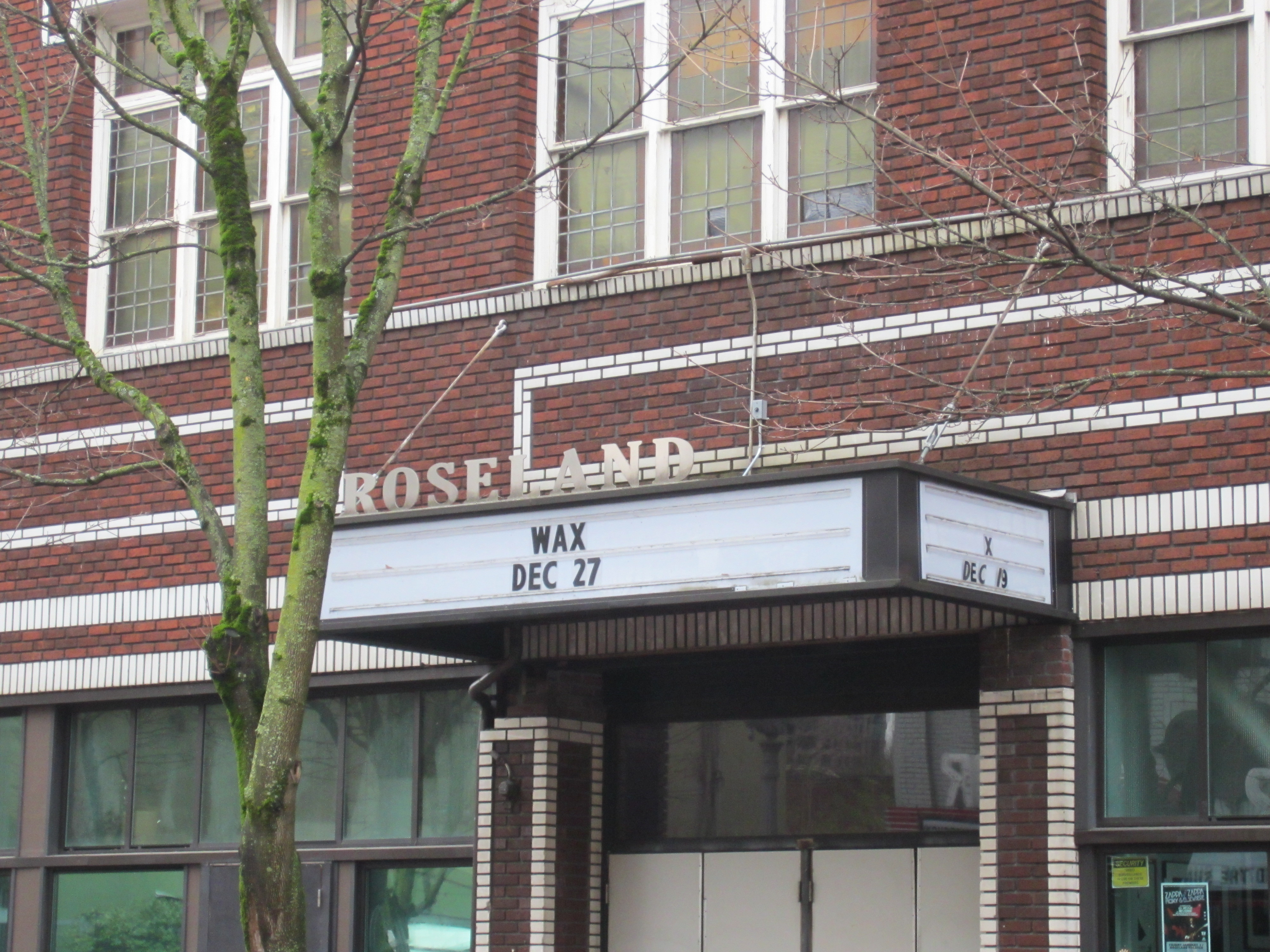
Theatre signage in 2014

Roseland Theater has been called a "somewhat chaotic" Portland staple, hosting "multi-generational concerts every night of the week by everyone from small local bands to huge national icons". The all-ages venue is known for its smaller size, accommodating up to 1,400 people. It is a popular venue for touring rock acts, though it also hosts blues, comedy, dance, hip hop, indie, and rap artists. Performers have included Ray Charles, the Dan Reed Network, Bob Dylan, Medeski Martin & Wood, Miles Davis, the Misfits, the Pixies, Bonnie Raitt, and the Red Hot Chili Peppers. During the 1990s, Phish performed at the venue four times, including once when it was still called Starry Night. In the 2010s, the venue hosted Cut Copy, Marilyn Manson, Metric, Prince, and Snoop Dogg.

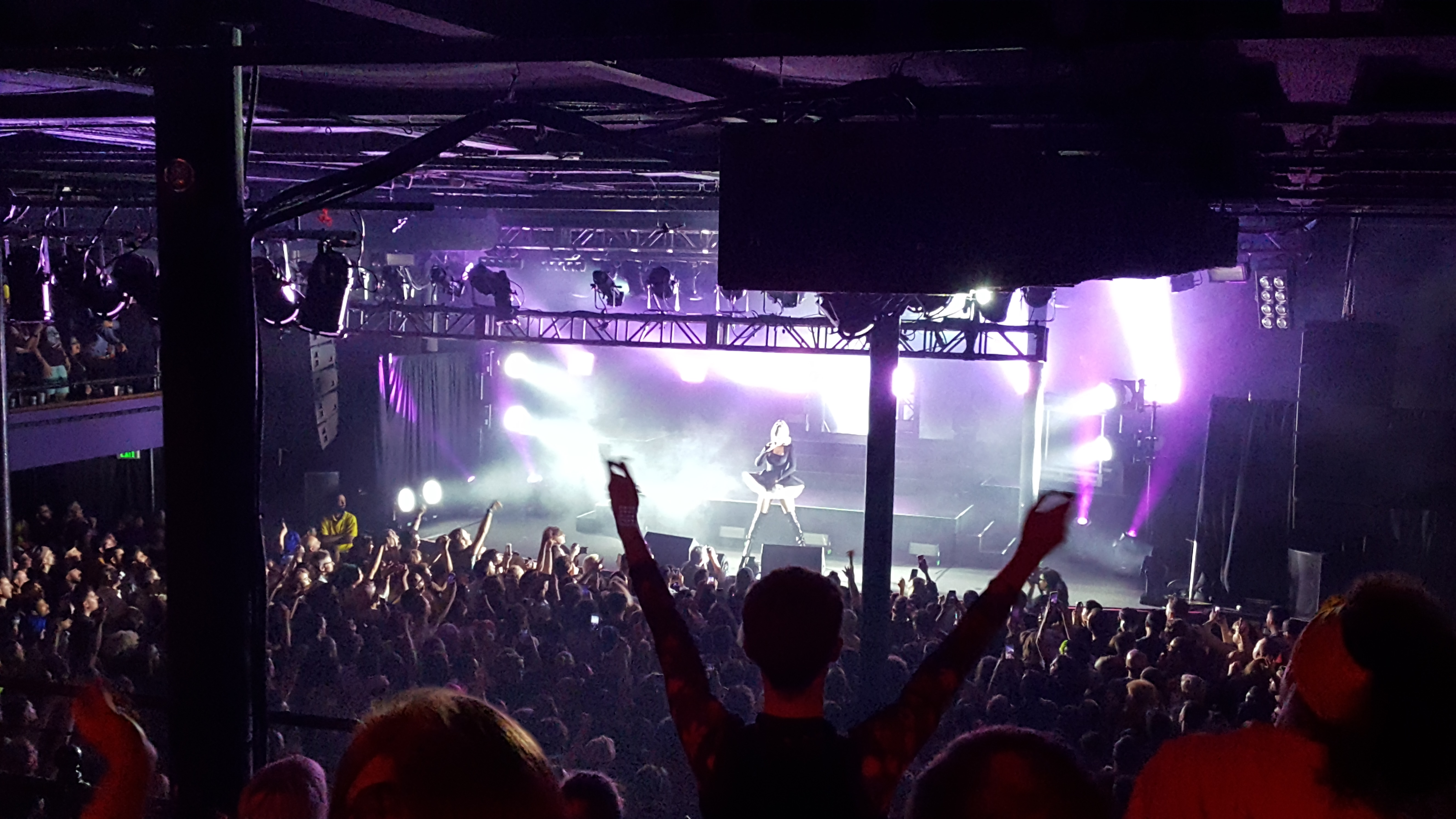
View from the balcony of Kim Petras performing in 2019

Roseland features a standing-only main floor and an upstairs balcony for patrons aged 21 or older because of an adjacent bar, and can also host a variety of events, including cage fighting. Downstairs includes Roseland Grill, a narrow bar with a wall covered in posters. Peter's Room, an intimate showcase venue, includes a restaurant and bar and has a capacity of 400 people. Peter's Room is open during all Roseland events and streams activity from the theater's main stage on screens. The 16-by-20-foot (5 by 6 m) stage in Peter's Room is 4 feet (1.2 m) above the main floor. According to Double Tee, the theater and Peter's Room host between 150 and 180 events annually.

In 2023, Leiken sold the company which manages Roseland Theater to Mammoth Northwest. According to Willamette Week, he "retains ownership of the Roseland and will take on a 'coaching' role in the business through the end of the year".

== Reception ==
In 2008, Willamette Week named Roseland the "Best Haunted Venue" in a retrospective "Best of Portland" list highlighting the best of 1988. Music journalist Martin Acaster wrote: "The Roseland has all the ambiance of a dank cave but boasts stellar acoustics." Travelogue writer Rachel Dresbeck noted the "eclectic mix" of music genres hosted by the venue, which she said has "great sound" and "good stage visibility".

== See also ==
- Culture of Portland, Oregon
- Music of Oregon
- Reportedly haunted locations in Oregon
