= List of NWA Powerrr episodes =

This is a list of episodes for NWA Powerrr, a weekly professional wrestling series produced by the National Wrestling Alliance (NWA). Until 2023, each season focused on storylines leading into the NWA's pay-per-view events. Beginning with season 16, which was taped during the January 13, 2024 NWA Paranoia event from Fort Lauderdale, Florida, the NWA's "Signature Live Events" are taped for future Powerrr episodes.

Episodes from Powerrr's companion series, Powerrr Surge, are also listed.

== Series overview ==
Season	Episodes	Originally released	
Season	Episodes	First released	Last released
1	9	October 8, 2019	December 3, 2019
2	6	December 17, 2019	January 21, 2020
3	6	January 28, 2020	May 12, 2020
4	8	March 23, 2021	May 25, 2021
5	12	June 8, 2021	August 24, 2021
6	11	August 31, 2021	November 30, 2021
7	10	December 7, 2021	March 8, 2022
8	11	March 22, 2022	June 7, 2022
9	11	June 14, 2022	August 23, 2022
10	9	August 30, 2022	November 8, 2022
11	10	November 15, 2022	February 7, 2023
12	8	February 14, 2023	April 4, 2023
13	8	April 11, 2023	June 27, 2023
14	7	July 11, 2023	August 22, 2023
15	9	August 29, 2023	October 24, 2023
16	14	October 31, 2023	January 31, 2024
17	9	February 6, 2024	April 2, 2024
18	10	April 9, 2024	June 11, 2024
19	15	June 18, 2024	September 24, 2024
20	9	October 1, 2024	November 26, 2024
21	9	December 3, 2024	January 27, 2025
22	11	February 4, 2025	April 17, 2025
23	12	April 22, 2025	July 8, 2025
24	12	July 29, 2025	October 14, 2025
25	10	October 21, 2025	December 23, 2025
26	18	December 30, 2025	April 28, 2026
27	18	May 1, 2026	August 22, 2026
28	TBD	August 29, 2026	TBD

== Episode list ==
=== Season 1: Into the Fire ===
No.	Title	Taped date	Location	Original air date
1 (S1E1)	"Premiere"	September 30, 2019	Atlanta, GA	October 8, 2019
After a long career in NWA, Tim Storm wants one more chance to win the NWA Worlds Heavyweight Championship and agrees to face Nick Aldis in a Last Chance match. Matches: No. / Results / Stipulations; 1 / The Dawsons (Dave Dawson and Zane Dawson) defeated Sal Rinauro and Billy Buck / Tag team match; 2 / Eli Drake defeated Caleb Konley / Singles match; 3 / The Wild Cards (Thom Latimer and Royce Isaacs) defeated Danny White and Mims / Tag team match; 4 / James Storm defeated Jocephus / Singles match; 5 / Nick Aldis (c) (with Kamille) defeated Tim Storm / Last Chance match for the NWA Worlds Heavyweight Championship; (c) / – the champion(s) heading into the match
2 (S1E2)	"Clickbait"	September 30, 2019	Atlanta, GA	October 15, 2019
The fallout from the premiere episode's main event, Joe Galli interviews world champ Nick Aldis and his silent valet, Kamille. Matches: No. / Results / Stipulations; 1 / Ricky Starks defeated Trevor Murdoch / Singles match; 2 / Colt Cabana and Mr. Anderson defeated Sal Rinauro and Jordan Kingsley / Tag team match; 3 / Allysin Kay defeated Ashley Vox / Singles match; 4 / The Wild Cards (Thomas Latimer and Royce Isaacs) (c) vs. Outlaw Inc. (Eddie Kingston and Homicide) ended in a no contest / Tag team match for the NWA World Tag Team Championship; (c) / – the champion(s) heading into the match
3 (S1E3)	"Twilight of Tim Storm"	September 30, 2019	Atlanta, GA	October 22, 2019
After Tim Storm lost his Last Chance match on the premiere episode, Eli Drake convinces Storm that he still has purpose in NWA and agrees to team with him later that night to take on The Dawsons. Matches: No. / Results / Stipulations; 1 / Marti Belle defeated Crystal Rose / Singles match; 2 / Caleb Konley defeated Dan Parker / Singles match; 3 / The Dawsons (Dave Dawson and Zane Dawson) defeated Eli Drake and Tim Storm / Tag team match
4 (S1E4)	"Dealer Calls Again"	September 30, 2019	Atlanta, GA	October 29, 2019
The main event carries serious stipulations: if James Storm's team wins, he forfeits his NWA National Championship in exchange for a shot at Nick Aldis's NWA Worlds Heavyweight Championship, but if Aldis's team wins, Colt Cabana receives a NWA National Championship opportunity. Matches: No. / Results / Stipulations; 1 / Trevor Murdoch defeated Jocephus / Singles match; 2 / The Dawsons (Dave Dawson and Zane Dawson) defeated Outlaw Inc. (Eddie Kingston and Homicide) / No Disqualification match; 3 / Ashley Vox defeated Marti Belle / Singles match; 4 / Ricky Starks defeated Aron Stevens / Singles match; 5 / Nick Aldis, Colt Cabana and Mr. Anderson defeated James Storm and The Wild Cards (Thom Latimer and Royce Isaacs) / 6-man tag team match
5 (S1E5)	"James Storm vs. Colt Cabana"	October 1, 2019	Atlanta, GA	November 5, 2019
A new champion is crowned, and a legendary tag team returns to the NWA. Matches: No. / Results / Stipulations; 1 / The Dawsons (Dave Dawson and Zane Dawson) defeated Mims and Jordan Kingsley / Tag team match; 2 / Thunder Rosa defeated Ashley Vox / Singles match; 3 / Ricky Starks defeated Aron Stevens 2–0 / 2-out-of-3 falls match; 4 / Colt Cabana (with Mr. Anderson) defeated James Storm (c) (with Eli Drake) / Singles match for the NWA National Championship; 5 / Outlaw, Inc. (Eddie Kingston and Homicide) defeated The Dawsons (Dave Dawson and Zane Dawson) / Tag team match Outlaw, Inc.'s number one contendership was on the line during the match; (c) / – the champion(s) heading into the match
6 (S1E6)	"More Questions Than Answers"	October 1, 2019	Atlanta, GA	November 12, 2019
Things get complicated between Nick Aldis and Kamille when the NWA World Tag Team Championships are on the line. Matches: No. / Results / Stipulations; 1 / Trevor Murdoch defeated Caleb Konley / Singles match; 2 / Thunder Rosa and Marti Belle defeated Crystal Rose and Brooklyn Creed / Tag team match; 3 / The Question Mark defeated Dan Parker / Singles match; 4 / The Wild Cards (Thom Latimer and Royce Isaacs) (c) defeated Outlaw, Inc. (Eddie Kingston and Homicide) / Tag team match for the NWA World Tag Team Championship; (c) / – the champion(s) heading into the match
7 (S1E7)	"The Phoenix Rises"	October 1, 2019	Atlanta, GA	November 19, 2019
Trevor Murdoch is out to prove he deserves a contract with the NWA, and Melina makes her Powerrr move. Matches: No. / Results / Stipulations; 1 / Nick Aldis defeated Trevor Murdoch / Singles match; 2 / The Question Mark vs. Ricky Starks ended in a no contest / Singles match; 3 / Thunder Rosa and Marti Belle defeated Allysin Kay and Ashley Vox / Tag team match; 4 / Aron Stevens and The Question Mark defeated Ricky Starks and Colt Cabana / Tag team match
8 (S1E8)	"Step Into The Fire"	N/A	Atlanta, GA	November 26, 2019
A clip show featuring a behind-the-scenes documentary on Thunder Rosa's debut MMA match in Combate Americas, and more information about the upcoming Into the Fire pay-per-view. Matches: No. / Results / Stipulations; 1 / The Question Mark (with Aron Stevens) defeated Zane Dawson (with Dave Dawson) / Mask vs. Shakespeare Empty Arena match Since Zane Dawson lost, The Dawsons had to recite Shakespeare; Had The Question Mark lost, he would have been forced to unmask
9 (S1E9)	"One More Time"	October 1, 2019	Atlanta, GA	December 3, 2019
The legendary Rock 'n' Roll Express try to get back on top of the tag team division. Matches: No. / Results / Stipulations; 1 / Aron Stevens defeated Ricky Starks / Singles match; 2 / The Rock 'n' Roll Express (Ricky Morton and Robert Gibson) defeated The Wild Cards (Thom Latimer and Royce Isaacs) (c) / Tag team match for the NWA World Tag Team Championship; (c) / – the champion(s) heading into the match

=== Season 2: Hard Times ===
No.	Title	Taped date	Location	Original air date
10 (S2E1)	"The Villain Effect"	December 15, 2019	Atlanta, GA	December 17, 2019
Ring of Honor's Marty Scurll makes his presence felt, the NWA World Television Championship tournament begins, and a new faction emerges. Stu Bennett replaces Jim Cornette on commentary. Matches: No. / Results / Stipulations; 1 / Zicky Dice defeated CW Anderson and Sal Rinauro / NWA World Television Championship Tournament Qualifying Three-Way match; 2 / The Rock 'n' Roll Express (Ricky Morton and Robert Gibson) defeated Sean Sims and Zach Mosley / Tag team match; 3 / The Wild Cards (Thom Latimer and Royce Isaacs) defeated The Dawsons (Dave Dawson and Zane Dawson) / Tag team match; 4 / Eli Drake defeated Mr. Anderson / No Disqualification match
11 (S2E2)	"Not A Christmas Movie"	December 15, 2019	Atlanta, GA	December 24, 2019
Christmas has arrived in the NWA Arena and there will be merriment, eliminations, and Strictly Business. Matches: No. / Results / Stipulations; 1 / Ricky Starks defeated Eddie Kingston / NWA World Television Championship Tournament Qualifying match; 2 / James Storm defeated Royce Isaacs by countout / Singles match; 3 / Melina, Thunder Rosa and Marti Belle defeated Allysin Kay, Ashley Vox and ODB / 6-woman tag team match; 4 / The Question Mark defeated Colt Cabana / NWA World Television Championship Tournament Qualifying match
12 (S2E3)	"Something Left To Prove"	December 15, 2019	Atlanta, GA	December 31, 2019
Taking Mama Storm's advice, Tim Storm knows he has something left to prove: winning the NWA World Television Championship tournament. Matches: No. / Results / Stipulations; 1 / Aron Stevens defeated Sal Rinauro / Submission match; 2 / Trevor Murdoch defeated Aron Stevens / Singles match; 3 / Tasha Steelz defeated Marti Belle (with Melina) / Singles match; 4 / Tim Storm defeated Royce Isaacs / NWA World Television Championship Tournament Qualifying match
13 (S2E4)	"Who's The Third Man, Brother?"	December 16, 2019	Atlanta, GA	January 7, 2020
Thunder Rosa moves up the ranks in the women's division, Nick Aldis and Ricky Starks go the limit in a hard-fought battle, and Scott Steiner makes a surprise appearance. Matches: No. / Results / Stipulations; 1 / Zicky Dice defeated Caleb Konley / NWA World Television Championship Tournament Qualifying match; 2 / Thunder Rosa defeated ODB / Singles match; 3 / Nick Aldis vs. Ricky Starks ended in a time limit draw / Singles match; 4 / Eli Drake and James Storm defeated Colt Cabana and Mr. Anderson by Disqualification / Tag team match
14 (S2E5)	"Strictly Business Takeover"	December 16, 2019	Atlanta, GA	January 14, 2020
Scott Steiner has an open mic, Da Pope is looking for a team, and Ricky Morton may finally get a chance at Ten Pounds of Gold. Matches: No. / Results / Stipulations; 1 / Zane Dawson defeated Dave Dawson / NWA World Television Championship Tournament Qualifying match; 2 / Melina defeated Ashley Vox / Singles match; 3 / Aron Stevens and The Question Mark defeated Outlaw, Inc. (Eddie Kingston and Homicide) / Tag team match; 4 / Eli Drake, Robert Gibson and Tim Storm (with Ricky Morton) defeated Strictly Business (Thom Latimer, Royce Isaacs and Scott Steiner) (with Kamille) / 6-man tag team match If Gibson, Storm and Drake win, Ricky Morton gets an NWA Title shot against Nick Aldis.
15 (S2E6)	"Generation Clash"	December 16, 2019	Atlanta, GA	January 21, 2020
Anderson and Cabana explode, the NWA World Television Championship tournament is set, and two different generations of wrestling champions compete in the main event. Matches: No. / Results / Stipulations; 1 / Thunder Rosa defeated Tasha Steelz / Singles match; 2 / Trevor Murdoch defeated Thom Latimer / NWA World Television Championship Tournament Qualifying match; 3 / Allysin Kay defeated Marti Belle / No Disqualification match; 4 / Mr. Anderson defeated Caleb Konley, CW Anderson, Jocephus, Colt Cabana, Dave Dawson, Aron Stevens and Sal Rinauro / NWA World Television Championship Tournament Qualifying Gauntlet match; 5 / Nick Aldis (c) defeated Ricky Morton / Singles match for the NWA Worlds Heavyweight Championship; (c) / – the champion(s) heading into the match

=== Season 3: Crockett Cup 2020 ===
The 2020 Crockett Cup would ultimately be cancelled due to the COVID-19 pandemic. The series would also go on a hiatus at the end of the season.

No.	Title	Taped date	Location	Original air date
16 (S3E1)	"Dealer vs. Villain"	January 25, 2020	Atlanta, GA	January 28, 2020
Matches: No. / Results / Stipulations; 1 / Royce Isaacs (with May Valentine) defeated Andre Guhn / Singles match; 2 / Ricky Starks (c) defeated Zicky Dice / Singles match for the NWA World Television Championship; (c) / – the champion(s) heading into the match
17 (S3E2)	"Pride vs. Thunder"	January 25, 2020	Atlanta, GA	February 4, 2020
Matches: No. / Results / Stipulations; 1 / Matt Cross defeated Caleb Konley / Singles match; 2 / Aron Stevens (c) (with The Question Mark) vs. Trevor Murdoch ended in a time limit draw / Singles match for the NWA National Championship; 3 / Eli Drake and James Storm defeated Jocephus and Mims / Tag team match; 4 / Thunder Rosa (c) defeated Allysin Kay / Singles match for the NWA World Women's Championship; (c) / – the champion(s) heading into the match
18 (S3E3)	"Money Where Your Mouth Is"	January 25, 2020	Atlanta, GA	February 11, 2020
Matches: No. / Results / Stipulations; 1 / The Bouncers (Beer City Bruiser and Brian Milonas) (with Eddie Kingston) defeated The Dawsons (Dave Dawson and Zane Dawson) (with Da Pope) / Tag team match; 2 / Thom Latimer defeated Tim Storm / Singles match; 3 / Ricky Starks (c) vs. Matt Cross ended in a time limit draw / Singles match for the NWA World Television Championship; 4 / Melina defeated Tasha Steelz / Singles match; 5 / Nick Aldis and Royce Isaacs defeated The Rock 'n' Roll Express (Ricky Morton and Robert Gibson) / Tag team match; (c) / – the champion(s) heading into the match
19 (S3E4)	"Strictly Chaos"	January 26, 2020	Atlanta, GA	February 25, 2020
Matches: No. / Results / Stipulations; 1 / Zicky Dice defeated Ricky Starks and Matt Cross / Three-Way match; 2 / Trevor Murdoch defeated The Question Mark (with Aron Stevens) / Singles match; 3 / Thunder Rosa (c) defeated Melina by countout / Singles match for the NWA World Women's Championship; (c) / – the champion(s) heading into the match
20 (S3E5)	"Stand & Defend"	January 26, 2020	Atlanta, GA	March 3, 2020
Matches: No. / Results / Stipulations; 1 / Zicky Dice defeated Ricky Starks (c) / Singles match for the NWA World Television Championship; 2 / Caleb Konley and CW Anderson defeated The Dawsons (Dave Dawson and Zane Dawson) / Tag team match; 3 / Eli Drake and James Storm (c) (with Eddie Kingston) defeated The Bouncers (Beer City Bruiser and Brian Milonas) (with Da Pope) / Tag team match for the NWA World Tag Team Championship; (c) / – the champion(s) heading into the match
21 (S3E6)	"Super Powerrr"	January 26, 2020	Atlanta, GA	May 12, 2020
Matches: No. / Results / Stipulations; 1 / Kamille defeated Madi Maxx / Singles match; 2 / The Rock 'n' Roll Express (Ricky Morton and Robert Gibson) defeated Aron Stevens and The Question Mark / Tag team match; 3 / Tim Storm defeated Jax Dane / No Disqualification match; 4 / Tasha Steelz defeated Marti Belle and Ashley Vox / Three-Way match; 5 / Strictly Business (Nick Aldis and Thom Latimer) defeated Villain Enterprises (Marty Scurll and Brody King) / Tag team match

=== Season 4: When Our Shadows Fall ===
No.	Title	Taped date	Location	Original air date
22 (S4E1)	"Episode 22"	March 21, 2021	Atlanta, GA	March 23, 2021
Matches: No. / Results / Stipulations; 1 / Kamille defeated Alex Gracia / Singles match; 2 / Fred Rosser defeated Marshe Rockett and Matt Cross / Three-way match to determine the No. 1 Contender to the NWA World Television Championship; 3 / Mike Parrow defeated Jordan Clearwater / Singles match; 4 / Strictly Business (Nick Aldis and Thom Latimer) and Chris Adonis defeated J. R. Kratos, Aron Stevens, and Elijah Burke / Six-man tag team match
23 (S4E2)	"Episode 23"	March 21, 2021	Atlanta, GA	March 30, 2021
Matches: No. / Results / Stipulations; 1 / Slice Boogie defeated Jeremiah Plunkett / Singles match; 2 / Tyrus (with Austin Idol) defeated Mims / Singles match; 3 / Alex Gracia and Thunder Rosa defeated Jennacide and Skye Blue by disqualification / Tag team match; 4 / Chris Adonis defeated Trevor Murdoch (c) / No disqualification match for the NWA National Championship; (c) / – the champion(s) heading into the match
24 (S4E3)	"Episode 24"	March 21, 2021	Atlanta, GA	April 6, 2021
Matches: No. / Results / Stipulations; 1 / Strictly Business (Chris Adonis and Thom Latimer) defeated The End (Odinson and Parrow) by referee's decision / Tag team match; 2 / Mims and Slice Boogie defeated The War Kings (Crimson and Jax Dane) / Tag team match; 3 / Elijah Burke (c) defeated Fred Rosser / Singles match for the NWA World Television Championship; (c) / – the champion(s) heading into the match
25 (S4E4)	"Episode 25"	N/A	Atlanta, GA	April 20, 2021
Matches: No. / Results / Stipulations; 1 / Sal Rinauro and Tim Storm defeated Aron Stevens and J. R. Kratos / Tag team match; 2 / Tyrus (with Austin Idol) defeated Marshe Rockett and Matt Cross / Three-way match to determine the No. 1 Contender to the NWA World Television Championship; 3 / Kamille defeated Jennacide / Singles match; 4 / Nick Aldis vs. Jordan Clearwater ended in a no contest / Singles match
26 (S4E5)	"Episode 26"	N/A	Atlanta, GA	April 27, 2021
Matches: No. / Results / Stipulations; 1 / J. R. Kratos vs. Sal Rinauro ended in a no contest / Singles match; 2 / Elijah Burke (c) vs. Tyrus (with Austin Idol) ended in a draw / Singles match for the NWA World Television Championship; 3 / J. R. Kratos and Strictly Business (Chris Adonis and Thom Latimer) defeated Aron Stevens, Tim Storm, and Trevor Murdoch (with Sal Rinauro) / Six-man tag team match Since Murdoch's team lost, he would have to leave the NWA for 30 days without pay If they had won, he would've received a National title match against Chris Adonis; (c) / – the champion(s) heading into the match
27 (S4E6)	"Episode 27"	N/A	Atlanta, GA	May 11, 2021
Matches: No. / Results / Stipulations; 1 / Matt Cross defeated Mims / Singles match to determine the No. 1 contender for the NWA World Television Championship; 2 / J. R. Kratos defeated Sal Rinauro / Singles match; 3 / Slice Boogie defeated Jax Dane via forfeit / Falls Count Anywhere match
28 (S4E7)	"Super Powerrr, Episode 28"	N/A	Atlanta, GA	May 18, 2021
Matches: No. / Results / Stipulations; 1 / Elijah Burke (c) defeated Matt Cross / Singles match for the NWA World Television Championship; 2 / Aron Stevens and J. R. Kratos defeated Fred Rosser and Marshe Rockett / Tag team match; 3 / Thunder Rosa defeated Jennacide / Singles match; 4 / The War Kings (Crimson and Jax Dane) defeated The End (Odinson and Parrow) / Tag team match to determine the No. 1 contender to the NWA World Tag Team Championship; (c) / – the champion(s) heading into the match
29 (S4E8)	"Episode 29"	N/A	Atlanta, GA	May 25, 2021
Matches: No. / Results / Stipulations; 1 / Aron Stevens and J. R. Kratos (c) defeated The War Kings (Crimson and Jax Dane) / Tag team match for the NWA World Tag Team Championship; 2 / Nick Aldis defeated Mims / Singles match; 3 / Kamille (with Taryn Terrell) vs. Thunder Rosa (with Melina) ended in a draw / Singles match to determine the No. 1 contender to the NWA World Women's Championship; If Rosa had lost, she would have no longer been able to compete outside the NWA; 4 / Trevor Murdoch won by last eliminating Chris Adonis; The other participants were: Crimson, Fred Rosser, Jax Dane, Jeremiah Plunkett, Jordan Clearwater, Mims, Marshe Rockett, Matt Cross, Tyrus, Parrow, Odinson, Sal Rinauro, Slice Boogie, and Thom Latimer / Battle royal to determine the No. 1 contender to the NWA Worlds Heavyweight Championship; (c) / – the champion(s) heading into the match

=== Season 5: EmPowerrr and NWA 73 ===
No.	Title	Taped date	Location	Original air date
30 (S5E1)	"Episode 30"	N/A	Atlanta, GA	June 8, 2021
Matches: No. / Results / Stipulations; 1 / Elijah Burke (c) defeated Luke Hawx (with PJ Hawx) / Singles match for the NWA World Television Championship; 2 / Taryn Terrell defeated Lady Frost / Singles match; 3 / La Rebelión (Mecha Wolf and Bestia 666) vs. The End (Odinson and Parrow) ended in a no contest / Tag team match; (c) / – the champion(s) heading into the match
31 (S5E2)	"Episode 31"	N/A	Atlanta, GA	June 15, 2021
Matches: No. / Results / Stipulations; 1 / Melina defeated Jennacide and Kenzie Paige / Three-way match; 2 / Aron Stevens vs. PJ Hawx ended in a no contest / Singles match; 3 / JTG defeated Fred Rosser and Sam Rudo / NWA National Championship qualifying match
32 (S5E3)	"Episode 32"	N/A	Atlanta, GA	June 22, 2021
Matches: No. / Results / Stipulations; 1^{D} / Sal Rinauro (with Danny Deals) defeated Colby Corino and PJ Hawx / Three-way match to determine the No. 1 contender to the NWA World Television Championship; 2 / The Masked Mystery Man defeated Mims / Singles match; 3 / Tyrus (with Austin Idol) defeated BLK Jeez and Jordan Clearwater / Handicap match; 4 / Crimson (with Jax Dane) defeated Slice Boogie / Falls Count Anywhere match; 5 / Chris Adonis defeated Parrow and Thom Latimer / NWA National Championship qualifying match; D / – this was a dark match
33 (S5E4)	"Episode 33"	N/A	Atlanta, GA	June 29, 2021
Matches: No. / Results / Stipulations; 1 / Jennacide (with Taryn Terrell) defeated Lady Frost / Singles match; 2 / Aron Stevens, Captain Yuma, and Mims vs. J. R. Kratos and Hawx Aerie (Luke Hawx and PJ Hawx) ended in a no contest / Six-man tag team match; 3 / Kylie Rae defeated Melina / Singles match
34 (S5E5)	"Super Power, Episode 34"	N/A	Atlanta, GA	July 6, 2021
Matches: No. / Results / Stipulations; 1 / Elijah Burke (c) defeated Sal Rinauro (with Danny Deals) / Singles match for the NWA World Television Championship; 2 / Kylie Rae and Serena Deeb defeated Skye Blue and Thunder Rosa / Tag team match; 3 / Homicide and La Rebelión (Mecha Wolf and Bestia 666) defeated Sam Rudo and Hawx Aerie (Luke Hawx and PJ Hawx) / Lucha Rules tag team match; 4 / Chris Adonis defeated JTG / Singles match for the vacant NWA National Championship; (c) / – the champion(s) heading into the match
35 (S5E6)	"The Champions Series – Part 1, Episode 35"	N/A	Atlanta, GA	July 20, 2021
This episode featured the open draft for the NWA Champions Series, a points-based team round-robin tournament featuring teams of 5 wrestlers co-captained by an NWA champion and a legend. The rules of the Champions Series are as follow: Points can be attained by pinfall (5), submission (5), disqualification (3), or draw (2 each); Captains can pick the positions of their people's matchups; Should a bracket end in deadlock, the NWA will award the tie break to the team that won their matches quicker; Members of the winning team earn open title opportunities that can redeem at any time; Captains can either be protected by their team for a year or gain a title opportunity of their own; The teams are: NWA World Women's Champion Kamille and Austin Idol: Thom Latimer, Kenzie Paige, J. R. Kratos, and Mims (Alternate: Sal Rinauro) NWA World Tag Team Champion Aron Stevens and Taryn Terrell: Tyrus, Lady Frost, JTG, and Marshe Rockett (Alternate: Jordan Clearwater) NWA World Television Champion The Pope and Velvet Sky: Trevor Murdoch, Jennacide, Jax Dane, and The Masked Mystery Man (Alternate: Colby Corino) NWA Worlds Heavyweight Champion Nick Aldis and Melina: Crimson, Skye Blue, Fred Rosser, and Slice Boogie (Alternate: Jeremiah Plunkett) The brackets are: Team Aron/Taryn vs. Team Kamille/Idol; Team Pope/Velvet vs. Team Aldis/Melina
36 (S5E7)	"The Champions Series – Part 2, Episode 36"	N/A	Atlanta, GA	July 27, 2021
Matches: No. / Results / Stipulations; 1 / Thom Latimer (Team Kamille/Idol) [5] defeated Marshe Rockett (Team Aron/Taryn) [0] by pinfall / Singles match, Champions Series Block A match; 2 / Jennacide (Team Pope/Velvet) [5] defeated Skye Blue (Team Aldis/Melina) [0] by pinfall / Singles match, Champions Series Block B match; 3 / JTG (Team Aron/Taryn) [5] defeated Matthew Mims (Team Kamille/Idol) [5] by pinfall / Singles match, Champions Series Block A match; 4 / Trevor Murdoch (Team Pope/Velvet) [10] defeated Fred Rosser (Team Aldis/Melina) [0] by submission / Singles match, Champions Series Block B match
37 (S5E8)	"The Champions Series – Part 3, Episode 37"	N/A	Atlanta, GA	August 3, 2021
Matches: No. / Results / Stipulations; 1 / Kenzie Paige (Team Kamille/Idol) [10] defeated Lady Frost (Team Aron/Taryn) [5] by pinfall / Singles match, Champions Series Block A match; 2 / Crimson (Team Aldis/Melina) [2] vs. The Masked Mystery Man (Team Pope/Velvet) [12] ended in a draw / Singles match, Champions Series Block B match; 3 / Jeremiah Plunkett (Team Aldis/Melina) [9] defeated Sal Rinauro (Team Kamille/Idol) [10], Colby Corino (Team Pope/Velvet) [9], and Jordan Clearwater (Team Aron/Taryn) [5] / Four-way match, Alternate Showcase match Winner earned seven points for their team, while the one who was pinned or submitted lost their team three points Plunkett pinned Corino; 4 / Tyrus (Team Aron/Taryn) [10] defeated J. R. Kratos (Team Kamille/Idol) [10] by pinfall / Singles match, Champions Series Block A match; 5 / Jax Dane (Team Pope/Velvet) [14] defeated Slice Boogie (Team Aldis/Melina) [9] by pinfall / Singles match, Champions Series Block B match
– (S5E9)	"Extra Powerrr"	N/A	Atlanta, GA	August 6, 2021
Matches: No. / Results / Stipulations; 1 / Nick Aldis (with Chris Adonis, Kamille, and Thom Latimer) defeated Odinson (with Parrow) by pinfall / Singles match; 2 / Tim Storm defeated Jordan Clearwater (with BLK Jeez) by pinfall / Singles match; 3 / Tyrus (with Austin Idol) defeated Elijah Burke (c) by pinfall / Singles match for the NWA World Television Championship; No Time Limit; (c) / – the champion(s) heading into the match
38 (S5E10)	"The Champions Series – Finale, Episode 38"	N/A	Atlanta, GA	August 10, 2021
Matches: No. / Results / Stipulations; 1 / Trevor Murdoch (Team Pope/Velvet) [5] defeated Thom Latimer (Team Kamille/Idol) [0] by pinfall / Singles match, Champions Series Finals match; 2 / Mims (Team Kamille/Idol) [5] defeated Jax Dane (Team Pope/Velvet) [5] by pinfall / Singles match, Champions Series Finals match; 3 / Strictly Business (Nick Aldis and Chris Adonis) defeated Jeremiah Plunkett and Shawn Daivari by submission / Tag team match Had Plunkett and Daivari won, Daivari would've earn a future NWA Worlds Heavyweight Championship match; 4 / Colby Corino (Team Pope/Velvet) [10] defeated Sal Rinauro (Team Kamille/Idol) [5] by pinfall / Singles match, Champions Series Finals match
40 (S5E11)	"Season 5 Best Of, Episode 40"	N/A	Atlanta, GA	August 24, 2021
A best of everything that happened in Season 5.

=== Season 6: Hard Times 2 ===
No.	Title	Taped date	Location	Original air date
41 (S6E1)	"Episode 41"	August 30, 2021	St. Louis, MO	August 31, 2021
Matches: No. / Results / Stipulations; 1 / Kiera Hogan defeated Skye Blue by pinfall / Singles match; 2 / The Rude Dudes (Nick Stanley and El Rudo) defeated The Ill Begotten (Captain YUMA and Rush Freeman) by pinfall / NWA World Tag Team Championship Eliminator Tournament Qualifying match; 3 / Kenzie Paige defeated Chelsea Green by pinfall / Singles match; 4 / Tyrus (with Austin Idol) (c) defeated BLK Jeez (with Jordan Clearwater) by pinfall / Singles match for the NWA World Television Championship; (c) / – the champion(s) heading into the match
42 (S6E2)	"Episode 42"	August 30, 2021	St. Louis, MO	September 7, 2021
Matches: No. / Results / Stipulations; 1 / The End (Odinson and Parrow) defeated Cyon and Jordan Clearwater by pinfall / NWA World Tag Team Championship Eliminator Tournament Quarterfinal match; 2 / Judais (with Father James Mitchell) defeated Jeremiah Plunkett by pinfall / Singles match; 3 / Kylie Rae defeated Tootie Lynn by submission / Singles match; 4 / The Big Strong Pals (Mims and Sal Rinauro) defeated Marshe Rockett and Slice Boogie by pinfall / NWA World Tag Team Championship Eliminator Tournament Quarterfinal match
43 (S6E3)	"Episode 43"	August 30, 2021	St. Louis, MO	September 14, 2021
Matches: No. / Results / Stipulations; 1 / Aron Stevens and J. R. Kratos defeated The Rude Dudes (Jamie Stanley and El Rudo) by pinfall / NWA World Tag Team Championship Eliminator Tournament Quarterfinal match; 2 / Marti Belle (with Allysin Kay) defeated Paola Blaze (with Jennacide and Taryn Terrell) by pinfall / Singles match; 3 / Jordan Clearwater (with BLK Jeez) defeated Cyon (with Austin Idol) and Jeremiah Plunkett / Three-way match to determine the No. 1 Contender to the NWA World Television Championship
44 (S6E4)	"Episode 44"	August 31, 2021	St. Louis, MO	September 28, 2021
Matches: No. / Results / Stipulations; 1 / Hawx Aerie (Luke Hawx and PJ Hawx) defeated Colby Corino and JTG by pinfall / NWA World Tag Team Championship Eliminator Tournament Quarterfinal match; 2 / Jennacide defeated Allysin Kay by pinfall / Singles match; 3 / James Storm vs. Judais (with Father James Mitchell) ended in a no contest / Singles match; 4 / Trevor Murdoch and Elijah Burke defeated Crimson and Jeremiah Plunkett and The End (Odinson and Parrow) / Three-way tag team match
45 (S6E5)	"Episode 45"	August 31, 2021	St. Louis, MO	October 5, 2021
Matches: No. / Results / Stipulations; 1 / La Rebelión (Bestia 666 and Mecha Wolf 450) defeated Marshe Rockett and Slice Boogie and The Ill Begotten (Captain YUMA and Rush Freeman) by pinfall / Three-Way Lucha Scramble; 2 / James Storm defeated Judais (with Father James Mitchell) by pinfall / Singles match; 3 / Kylie Rae defeated Allysin Kay (with Marti Belle) and Lady Frost via submission / Three-way match; 4 / Nick Aldis and Tim Storm defeated Strictly Business (Chris Adonis and Thom Latimer) (with Kamille) by pinfall / Tag team match
46 (S6E6)	"Episode 46"	August 31, 2021	St. Louis, MO	October 12, 2021
Matches: No. / Results / Stipulations; 1 / Hawx Aerie (Luke Hawx and PJ Hawx) defeated The Big Strong Pals (Mims and Sal Rinauro) via submission / NWA World Tag Team Championship Eliminator Tournament Semi-final match; 2 / Tyrus (with Austin Idol) (c) defeated Jordan Clearwater (with BLK Jeez) by pinfall / Singles match for the NWA World Television Championship; 3 / The End (Odinson and Parrow) defeated Aron Stevens and J. R. Kratos by pinfall / NWA World Tag Team Championship Eliminator Tournament Semi-final match; (c) / – the champion(s) heading into the match
47 (S6E7)	"EmPowerrr, Episode 47"	August 31, 2021	St. Louis, MO	October 26, 2021
Matches: No. / Results / Stipulations; 1 / Melina defeated Chelsea Green and Kylie Rae by pinfall / Three-way match to determine the No. 1 Contender to the NWA World Women's Championship; 2 / Kamille defeated Tootie Lynn by pinfall / Singles match; 3 / Lady Frost defeated Skye Blue by pinfall / Mildred Burke Rules match No Top Rope Moves, No Hard Exits, No Closed Fists; 4 / The Hex (Allysin Kay and Marti Belle) (c) defeated Jennacide and Paola Blaze (with Taryn Terrell) by pinfall / Tag team match for the NWA World Women's Tag Team Championship; 5 / Mickie James defeated Kiera Hogan by pinfall / Singles match; (c) / – the champion(s) heading into the match
48 (S6E8)	"By Any Means Necessary – Part 1, Episode 48"	October 24, 2021	Oak Grove, KY	November 2, 2021
Matches: No. / Results / Stipulations; 1 / The Pope defeated Colby Corino (with Jay Bradley and Wrecking Ball Legursky) by pinfall / Singles match; 2 / The Fixers (Jay Bradley and Wrecking Ball Legursky) defeated The Ill Begotten (Captain YUMA and Rush Freeman) by pinball / Tag team match; 3 / The OGK (Matt Taven and Mike Bennett) defeated The Fixers (Jay Bradley and Wrecking Ball Legursky) by pinfall / Tag team match; 4 / Judais (with Father James Mitchell) defeated Sal Rinauro (with Danny Deals) by pinfall / Singles match for Judais' NWA National Championship opportunity Since Rinauro lost, he cannot have a match for the title for 18 months; 5 / The Hex (Allysin Kay and Marti Belle) (c) defeated Tootie Lynn and Thunderkitty by pinfall / Tag team match for the NWA World Women's Tag Team Championship; 6 / Cyon defeated Mims by pinfall / Singles match; (c) / – the champion(s) heading into the match
49 (S6E9)	"By Any Means Necessary – Part 2, Episode 49"	October 24, 2021	Oak Grove, KY	November 9, 2021
Matches: No. / Results / Stipulations; 1 / Tim Storm defeated Jaden Roller by pinfall / No Disqualification match; 2 / Kamille (c) defeated Kenzie Paige (2–0) / Two-out-of-three falls match for the NWA World Women's Championship; 3 / Trevor Murdoch and Nick Aldis defeated Strictly Business (Thom Latimer and Chris Adonis) (with Kamille) by pinfall / Tag team match; 4 / Jax Dane defeated Crimson by pinfall / Steel Cage match; (c) / – the champion(s) heading into the match
50 (S6E10)	"Season Finale, Episode 50"	September 1, 2021	St. Louis, MO	November 23, 2021
Matches: No. / Results / Stipulations; 1 / Nick Aldis defeated Chris Adonis via submission / Singles match; 2 / Thom Latimer defeated Jaden Roller by pinfall / Singles match; 3 / Kenzie Paige defeated Taryn Terrell by countout / Social Distancing match Masks be worn at all times, Stay six feet apart; 4 / Colby Corino and JTG defeated The Rude Dudes (El Rudo and Jamie Stanley) by pinfall / Tag team match; 5 / Trevor Murdoch & Crimson defeated Jax Dane and Jeremiah Plunkett by pinfall / Tag team match

=== Season 7: Crockett Cup 2022 ===
No.	Title	Taped date	Location	Original air date
51 (S7E1)	"Episode 51"	December 5, 2021	Atlanta, GA	December 7, 2021
Matches: No. / Results / Stipulations; 1 / Colby Corino and The Fixers (Jay Bradley and Wrecking Ball Legursky) defeated Victor Benjamin and The OGK (Matt Taven and Mike Bennett by pinfall / Six-man tag team match; 2 / Thom Latimer defeated Miguel Robles by pinfall / Singles match; 3 / Jennacide defeated Paola Blaze (with Taryn Terrell) by pinfall / Singles match; 4 / Jax Dane defeated Mims by pinfall / Singles match Anthony Mayweather banned from ringside; 5 / The British Invasion (Doug Williams and Nick Aldis) defeated Hawx Aerie (Luke Hawx and PJ Hawx) by pinfall / Tag team match
52 (S7E2)	"Episode 52"	December 5, 2021	Atlanta, GA	December 14, 2021
Matches: No. / Results / Stipulations; 1 / Aron Stevens and J. R. Kratos defeated The Dirty Sexy Boys (Dirty Dango and JTG) by pinfall / Tag team match; 2 / The Hex (Allysin Kay and Marti Belle) (c) defeated Kiera Hogan and Mickie James by pinfall / Tag team match for the NWA World Women's Tag Team Championship; 3 / Mike Knox (with Matt Cardona) defeated Mims by pinfall / Singles match; (c) / – the champion(s) heading into the match
–	"2021 Year-In Review"	N/A	Atlanta, GA	December 28, 2021
Matches: No. / Results / Stipulations; 1 / Trevor Murdoch won by last eliminating Chris Adonis; The other participants were: Crimson, Fred Rosser, Jax Dane, Jeremiah Plunkett, Jordan Clearwater, Mims, Marshe Rockett, Matt Cross, Tyrus, Parrow, Odinson, Sal Rinauro, Slice Boogie, and Thom Latimer / Battle royal to determine the No. 1 contender to the NWA Worlds Heavyweight Championship; 2 / Kamille defeated Serena Deeb (c) by pinball / Singles match for the NWA World Women's Championship; 3 / Tyrus (with Austin Idol) defeated Elijah Burke (c) by pinfall / Singles match for the NWA World Television Championship; No Time Limit; 4 / Cyon defeated Mims by referee stoppage / Singles match; 5 / Nick Aldis and Tim Storm defeated Strictly Business (Chris Adonis and Thom Latimer) (with Kamille) by pinfall / Tag team match; (c) / – the champion(s) heading into the match
53 (S7E3)	"Episode 53"	December 5, 2021	Atlanta, GA	January 4, 2022
Matches: No. / Results / Stipulations; 1 / Jamie Stanley (with El Rudo) defeated Alex Taylor, Jeremiah Plunkett, and Miguel Robles by pinfall / NWA World Junior Heavyweight Championship tournament play-in match; 2 / Church's Money Enterprises (Jordan Clearwater and Marshe Rockett) (with BLK Jeez) defeated Cyon by pinfall / Handicap match; 3 / The Smiling Dragons (Kylie Rae and Tootie Lynn) defeated Kamille and Missa Kate via submission / Tag team match; 4 / Matt Taven defeated Wrecking Ball Legursky by pinfall / Singles match; 5 / Natalia Markova defeated Paola Blaze (with Taryn Terrell) by pinfall / Singles match; 6 / Homicide and La Rebelión (Bestia 666 and Mecha Wolf 450) defeated Jax Dane and The End (Odinson and Parrow) by pinfall / Six-man tag team match
54 (S7E4)	"Episode 54"	December 5, 2021	Atlanta, GA	January 11, 2022
Matches: No. / Results / Stipulations; 1 / Kiera Hogan defeated Christi Jaynes, Jennacide (with Taryn Terrell), and Kenzie Paige by pinfall / Four-way match to determine the No. 1 contender to the NWA World Women's Championship; 2 / Anthony Mayweather defeated Matthew Mims by countout / Singles match Winner gets a match with Jax Dane; 3 / The Dirty Sexy Boys (Dirty Dango and JTG) defeated The Rude Dudes (El Rudo and Jamie Stanley) by pinfall / Tag team match; 4 / Tyrus (c) (with BLK Jeez, Jordan Clearwater, and Marshe Rockett) defeated Jaden Roller by pinfall / Singles match for the NWA World Television Championship; 5 / Cyon defeated Judais (with Father James Mitchell) by disqualification / Singles match; 6 / Matt Cardona and Mike Knox defeated Tim Storm and Trevor Murdoch and Strictly Business (Chris Adonis and Thom Latimer) by pinfall / Three-way tag team match; (c) / – the champion(s) heading into the match
55 (S7E5)	"Episode 55"	December 5, 2021	Atlanta, GA	January 18, 2022
Matches: No. / Results / Stipulations; 1 / Kylie Rae defeated Allysin Kay by pinfall / Singles match; 2 / Melina defeated Madi Wrenkowski by pinfall / Singles match; 3 / The Fixers (Jay Bradley and Wrecking Ball Legursky) and Rush Freeman (with Captain YUMA and Alex Taylor) defeated The Dirty Sexy Boys (Dirty Dango and JTG) by pinfall / Handicap match; 4 / Hawx Aerie (Luke Hawx and PJ Hawx) defeated Church's Money Enterprises (Jordan Clearwater and Marshe Rockett) (with BLK Jeez and Tyrus) by pinfall / Tag team match
56 (S7E6)	"Episode 5"	December 6, 2021	Atlanta, GA	February 1, 2022
Matches: No. / Results / Stipulations; 1 / The Dirty Sexy Boys (Dirty Dango and JTG) defeated The Ill Begotten (Alex Taylor, Captain YUMA. and Rush Freeman) by pinfall / Handicap match; 2 / Cyon defeated Sal Rinauro (with Judais and Father James Mitchell) via submission / No Disqualification match; 3 / Trevor Murdoch (c) defeated Mike Knox (with Matt Cardona) by pinfall / Singles match for the NWA Worlds Heavyweight Championship; (c) / – the champion(s) heading into the match
57 (S7E7)	"Episode 57"	December 6, 2021	Atlanta, GA	February 8, 2022
Team War is contested as follows: Multiple teams of three face each other; One member of each team starts in the ring while their teammates wait on the floor; A wrestler can be eliminated by pinfall, submission, or over the top rope; Once a wrestler is eliminated, one of their teammates replaces them in the match; The match ends when a team's remaining wrestler(s) is left standing; The winners of the Team War Tournament will earn a $30,000 cash prize; Matches: No. / Results / Stipulations; 1 / El Rudo and Strictly Business (Chris Adonis and Thom Latimer) defeated Victor Benjamin and The OGK (Matt Taven and Mike Bennett), Homicide and La Rebelión (Bestia 666 and Mecha Wolf), and Colby Corino and The Fixers (Jay Bradley and Wrecking Ball Legursky) / Team War semi-final match; 2 / Kamille (c) defeated Kiera Hogan by pinfall / Singles match for the NWA World Women's Championship; 3 / Rodney Mack and The End (Odinson and Parrow) defeated Aron Stevens, J. R. Kratos, and Judais (with Father James Mitchell), Idolmania Sports Management (Tyrus, Jordan Clearwater, and Marshe Rockett) (with Austin Idol), and The Ill Begotten (Alex Taylor, Jeremiah Plunkett, and Rush Freeman) / Team War semi-final match; (c) / – the champion(s) heading into the match
58 (S7E8)	"Episode 58"	December 6, 2021	Atlanta, GA	February 15, 2022
Matches: No. / Results / Stipulations; 1 / The British Invasion (Doug Williams and Nick Aldis) defeated Fable Jake & Jaden Roller by pinfall / Tag team match; 2 / Tootie Lynn (with Kylie Rae) defeated Marti Belle (with Allysin Kay) by pinfall / Singles match; 3 / Jennacide vs. Natalia Markova ended in a double countout / Singles match; 4 / Melina defeated Christi Jaynes by pinfall / Singles match; 5 / Matt Cardona defeated Victor Benjamin by pinfall / Singles match; 6 / El Rudo and Strictly Business (Chris Adonis and Thom Latimer) defeated Rodney Mack and The End (Parrow and Odinson) / Team War final match
59 (S7E9)	"PowerrrTrip – Part 1, Episode 59"	February 12, 2022	Oak Grove, KY	February 22, 2022
Matches: No. / Results / Stipulations; 1 / Jax Dane defeated Eric Jackson by pinfall / Singles match; 2 / Chelsea Green defeated Kenzie Paige by pinfall / Singles match; 3 / Colby Corino defeated Rhett Titus (2–1) / Two-out-of-three falls match; 4 / Kamille (c) defeated Taryn Terrell by pinfall / Singles match for the NWA World Women's Championship; (c) / – the champion(s) heading into the match
60 (S7E9)	"PowerrrTrip – Part 2, Episode 60"	February 12, 2022	Oak Grove, KY	March 1, 2022
Matches: No. / Results / Stipulations; 1 / The Fixers (Jay Bradley and Wrecking Ball Legursky) defeated The OGK (Matt Taven and Mike Bennett) by pinfall / Crockett Cup first round tag team match; 2 / Mike Knox defeated The Pope by pinfall / Singles match; 3 / Anthony Mayweather defeated Chris Adonis (c) by pinfall / Singles match for the NWA National Championship; (c) / – the champion(s) heading into the match
61 (S7E10)	"PowerrrTrip – Part 3, Episode 61"	February 12, 2022	Oak Grove, KY	March 8, 2022
Matches: No. / Results / Stipulations; 1 / Idolmania Sports Management (Tyrus, BLK Jeez, Jordan Clearwater, and Marshe Rockett) (with Austin Idol) defeated Cyon, Mims, and The Ill Begotten (Alex Taylor and Rush Freeman) by pinfall / Eight-man tag team match; 2 / Nick Aldis defeated Thom Latimer by technical submission / "I Quit" match; 3 / Matt Cardona defeated Trevor Murdoch (c) by pinfall / Singles match for the NWA Worlds Heavyweight Championship; (c) / – the champion(s) heading into the match

=== Season 8: Alwayz Ready ===
No.	Title	Taped date	Location	Original air date
62 (S8E1)	"Episode 62"	March 21, 2022	Nashville, TN	March 22, 2022
Matches: No. / Results / Stipulations; 1 / The Briscoe Brothers (Jay Briscoe and Mark Briscoe) defeated The OGK (Matt Taven and Mike Bennett) by pinfall / Tag team match; 2 / Trevor Murdoch defeated Brett Buffshay by pinfall / Singles match; 3 / The Hex (Allysin Kay and Marti Belle) (c) defeated Jennacide and Paola Blaze (with Taryn Terrell) by pinfall / Tag team match for the NWA World Women's Tag Team Championship; Since Jennacide and Blaze lost, they will no longer be a team; 4 / Homicide (c) defeated Austin Aries by pinfall / Singles match for the NWA World Junior Heavyweight Championship; (c) / – the champion(s) heading into the match
63 (S8E2)	"Episode 63"	March 21, 2022	Nashville, TN	March 29, 2022
Matches: No. / Results / Stipulations; 1 / Kamille defeated Madi Wrenkowski by pinfall / Singles match; 2 / Magic Jake Dumas defeated Rodney Mack by pinfall / Singles match; 3 / The Cardonas (Mike Knox and VSK) defeated The Ill Begotten (Jeremiah Plunkett and Rush Freeman) (with Alex Taylor) by pinfall / Tag team match; 4 / Nick Aldis defeated Deontae Marshall via submission / Singles match; 5 / La Rebelión (Bestia 666 and Mecha Wolf 450) (c) defeated The End (Odinson and Parrow) by pinfall / Tag team match for the NWA World Tag Team Championship; (c) / – the champion(s) heading into the match
64 (S8E3)	"Episode 64"	March 21, 2022	Nashville, TN	April 5, 2022
Matches: No. / Results / Stipulations; 1 / Matt Cardona defeated Tim Storm by pinfall / Singles match If Storm won, he would've earned an NWA Worlds Heavyweight Championship match; 2 / Rhett Titus defeated Darius Lockhart by disqualification / Singles match; 3 / Trevor Murdoch defeated Garrisaon Creed by pinfall / Singles match; 4 / Tyrus (with Austin Idol) vs. Cyon ended in a no contest / Bodyslam Challenge; If Cyon had slammed Tyrus, he would've earned an NWA World Television Championship match
65 (S8E4)	"SuperPowerrr, Episode 65"	March 21, 2022	Nashville, TN	April 12, 2022
Matches: No. / Results / Stipulations; 1 / The Commonwealth Connection (Doug Williams and Harry Smith) defeated The Dirty Sexy Boys (JTG and Dirty Dango) via submission / Tag team match; 2 / KiLynn King defeated Natalia Markova by pinfall / Singles match; 3 / The Miserably Faithful (Judais, Sal the Pal, and Gags The Gimp) (with Father James Mitchell) defeated Colby Corino and The Fixers (Jay Bradley and Wrecking Ball Legursky) by pinfall / Singles match; 4 / Matt Cardona (c) defeated The Pope by pinfall / Singles match for the NWA Worlds Heavyweight Championship; (c) / – the champion(s) heading into the match
66 (S8E5)	"Episode 66"	March 22, 2022	Nashville, TN	April 26, 2022
Matches: No. / Results / Stipulations; 1 / Nick Aldis defeated Jordan Clearwater (with BLK Jeez) via submission / Singles match; 2 / Homicide (c) defeated Rhett Titus by pinfall / Singles match for the NWA World Junior Heavyweight Championship; 3 / Trevor Murdoch defeated Aron Stevens by pinfall / Singles match; 4 / Angelina Love defeated Tootie Lynn by pinfall / Singles match; 5 / La Rebelión (Bestia 666 and Mecha Wolf 450) (c) defeated The Briscoe Brothers (Jay Briscoe and Mark Briscoe) by pinfall / Tag team match for the NWA World Tag Team Championship; (c) / – the champion(s) heading into the match
67 (S8E6)	"Episode 67"	March 22, 2022	Nashville, TN	May 3, 2022
Matches: No. / Results / Stipulations; 1 / Nick Aldis defeated Mike Bennett via submission / Singles match; 2 / The Fixers (Jay Bradley and Wrecking Ball Legursky) defeated The Rude Dudes (El Rudo and Jamie Stanley) by pinfall / No Disqualification tag team match; 3 / Mims defeated Tyrus (with Idolmania Sports Management) / Bodyslam Challenge; Since Mims slammed Tyrus, he earns an NWA World Television Championship match; 4 / Mickie James defeated Kenzie Paige by pinfall / Singles match
68 (S8E7)	"Episode 68"	March 22, 2022	Nashville, TN	May 10, 2022
Matches: No. / Results / Stipulations; 1 / Kamille (with Thom Latimer) defeated Paola Blaze by pinfall / Singles match; 2 / Matt Taven defeated Judais {with Father James Mitchell) via disqualification / Singles match; 3 / The Dirty Sexy Boys (Dirty Dango and JTG) (with Angelina Love) defeated The Miserably Faithful (Sal The Pal and Gaagz The Gymp) by pinfall / Tag team match; 4 / KiLynn King defeated Chelsea Green and Jennacide by pinfall / Three-way match to determine the number one contender to the NWA World Women's Championship; 5 / Nick Aldis and The Commonwealth Connection (Doug Williams and Harry Smith) defeated The Cardona Family (Matt Cardona, Mike Knox, and VSK) (with Chelsea Green) via submission / Six-man tag team match
69 (S8E8)	"Episode 69"	March 22, 2022	Nashville, TN	May 17, 2022
Matches: No. / Results / Stipulations; 1 / The Hex (Allysin Kay and Marti Belle) (c) defeated Kenzie Paige and Madi Wrenkowski by pinfall / Tag team match for the NWA World Women's Tag Team Championship; 2 / Colby Corino defeated AJ Cazana by pinfall / Singles match; 3 / Jax Dane and The End (Parrow and Odinson) defeated Church's Money Enterprises (BLK Jeez, Jordan Clearwater, and Marshe Rockett) and The Ill Begotten (Alex Taylor, Jeremiah Plunkett, and Rush Freeman) (with Danny Deals) / Team War match; 4 / Mickie James defeated Natalia Markova (with Taryn Terrell) by pinfall / Singles match; (c) / – the champion(s) heading into the match
70 (S8E9)	"PowerrrTrip 2 – Part 1, Episode 70"	April 30, 2022	Oak Grove, KY	May 24, 2022
Matches: No. / Results / Stipulations; 1 / Max the Impaler defeated Ella Envy by pinfall / Singles match; 2 / Cyon defeated Joe Alonzo by pinfall / Singles match; 3 / Trevor Murdoch defeated Mike Knox via disqualification / Singles match
71 (S8E10)	"PowerrrTrip 2 – Part 2, Episode 71"	April 30, 2022	Oak Grove, KY	May 31, 2022
Matches: No. / Results / Stipulations; 1 / Matt Vine defeated Eric Jackson by pinfall / Singles match; 2 / Thom Latimer defeated Rhett Titus by pinfall / Singles match; 3 / Homicide (c) defeated Colby Corino by pinfall / Singles match for the NWA World Junior Heavyweight Championship; (c) / – the champion(s) heading into the match
72 (S8E11)	"PowerrrTrip 2 – Part 3, Episode 72"	April 30, 2022	Oak Grove, KY	June 7, 2022
Matches: No. / Results / Stipulations; 1 / Nick Aldis defeated Brian Myers via submission / Singles match; 2 / Tyrus defeated KC Roxx via disqualification / Bodyslam Challenge

=== Season 9: NWA 74 ===
No.	Title	Taped date	Location	Original air date
73 (S9E1)	"Knox Out – Part 1, Episode 73"	June 12, 2022	Knoxville, TN	June 14, 2022
Matches: No. / Results / Stipulations; 1 / Taya Valkyrie defeated Taryn Terrell by pinfall / Singles match; 2 / Strictly Business (Chris Adonis and Thom Latimer) defeated The Cardonas (Mike Knox and VSK) by pinfall / Tag team match
74 (S9E2)	"Knox Out – Part 2"	June 12, 2022	Knoxville, TN	June 21, 2022
Matches: No. / Results / Stipulations; 1 / Nick Aldis defeated Brett Buffshay by submission / Singles match; 2 / Idolmania Sports Management (Tyrus and Cyon) defeated The Ill Begotten (Alex Taylor and Jeremiah Plunkett) by pinfall / Tag team match
75 (S9E3)	"Knox Out – Part 3"	June 12, 2022	Knoxville, TN	June 28, 2022
Matches: No. / Results / Stipulations; 1 / Chelsea Green and Max the Impaler defeated Jennacide and Missa Kate by pinfall / Tag team match; 2 / PJ Hawx defeated Sal The Pal and Gustavo Aguilar via submission / Three-way match; 3 / Rodney Mack (with Aron Stevens) defeated Anthony Andrews via submission / Singles match; 4 / The Commonwealth Connection (Doug Williams and Harry Smith) (c) defeated La Rebelión (Bestia 666 and Mecha Wolf 450) by pinfall / Lucha Rules tag team match for the NWA World Tag Team Championship; (c) / – the champion(s) heading into the match
76 (S9E4)	"Episode 76"	June 13, 2022	Nashville, TN	July 5, 2022
Matches: No. / Results / Stipulations; 1 / Odinson defeated AJ Cazana and Judais (with Father James Mitchell) by pinfall / Three-way match to determine the No. 1 contender to the NWA World Television Championship; 2 / Trevor Murdoch defeated "Thrillbilly" Silas Mason (with Pollo Del Mar) by pinfall / Singles match; 3 / Kerry Morton (with Ricky Morton) defeated Jay Bradley (with Wrecking Ball Legursky) by pinfall / Singles match
77 (S9E5)	"Episode 77"	June 13, 2022	Nashville, TN	July 12, 2022
Matches: No. / Results / Stipulations; 1 / Thom Latimer defeated Chris Adonis by pinfall / Race to The Chase Tournament First Round Match; 2 / Brian Myers defeated The Pope by pinfall / Race to The Chase Tournament First Round Match; 3 / KiLynn King defeated Allysin Kay by pinfall / Singles match; 4 / Nick Aldis defeated Tim Storm via disqualification / Race to The Chase Tournament First Round Match
78 (S9E6)	"Episode 78"	June 13, 2022	Nashville, TN	July 19, 2022
Matches: No. / Results / Stipulations; 1 / Max the Impaler defeated Ella Envy and Taya Valkyrie by pinfall / Three-way match; 2 / La Rebelión (Bestia 666 and Mecha Wolf 450) (with Damián 666) vs. The OGK (Matt Taven and Mike Bennett) ended in a no contest / Tag team match; 3 / "Magic" Jake Dumas (with Christi Jaynes) defeated Eric Jackson by pinfall / Singles match; 4 / Nick Aldis defeated Mike Knox (with VSK), Brian Myers, and Thom Latimer by pinfall / Race to The Chase Tournament Finals
79 (S9E7)	"EmPowerrred"	June 13, 2022	Nashville, TN	July 26, 2022
Matches: No. / Results / Stipulations; 1 / Kenzie Paige defeated Kaci Lennox by pinfall / Singles match; 2 / Taya Valkyrie defeated KiLynn King via submission / Singles match to determine the number one contender for the NWA World Women's Championship; 3 / The Commonwealth Connection (Doug Williams and Harry Smith) (c) defeated The Dirty Sexy Boys (Dirty Dango and JTG) by pinfall / Tag team match for the NWA World Tag Team Championship; 4 / Kamille defeated Chelsea Green (with Matt Cardona) by pinfall / Singles match for the NWA World Women's Championship; (c) / – the champion(s) heading into the match
80 (S9E8)	"Episode 80"	June 13, 2022	Nashville, TN	August 2, 2022
Matches: No. / Results / Stipulations; 1 / Cyon (with Austin Idol) defeated Rodney Mack (with Aron Stevens) by pinfall / Singles match to determine the number one contender to the NWA National Heavyweight Championship; 2 / The Miserably Faithful (Judais, Sal The Pal, and Gaagz The Gymp) (with Father James Mitchell) defeated The Ill Begotten (Alex Taylor, Jeremiah Plunkett, and Rush Freeman) (with Danny Dealz and Ronaldo Freeman) / Team War match; 3 / Tyrus (with BLK Jeez) (c) defeated Odinson by pinfall / Singles match for the NWA World Television Championship; (c) / – the champion(s) heading into the match
81 (S9E9)	"Episode 81"	June 13, 2022	Nashville, TN	August 9, 2022
Matches: No. / Results / Stipulations; 1 / Mike Knox (with VSK) defeated D'Vin Graves / Tables match; 2 / Ricky Morton defeated Wrecking Ball Legursky by pinfall / Singles match; 3 / Jordan Clearwater (with BLK Jeez) defeated Joe Alonzo by pinfall / Singles match; 4 / Trevor Murdoch vs. The Pope ended in a double countout / Singles match
82 (S9E10)	"Episode 82"	June 13, 2022	Nashville, TN	August 16, 2022
Matches: No. / Results / Stipulations; 1 / Angelina Love and Chelsea Green defeated Rylee and Paola Blaze by pinfall / Tag team match; 2 / Tim Storm defeated Larry D by pinfall / Singles match; 3 / Kamille defeated Hayley Shadows by pinfall / Singles match; 4 / Rodney Mack (with Aron Stevens) defeated BLK Jeez via submission / Singles match
–	"Celebration 74"	June 13, 2022	Nashville, TN	August 23, 2022
Matches: No. / Results / Stipulations; 1 / Chris Adonis defeated Caprice Coleman via technical submission / Singles match; 2 / Jennacide defeated Kayla Kassidy by pinfall / Singles match; 3 / Hawx Aerie (Luke Hawx and PJ Hawx) defeated Gustavo Aguilar and Rhett Titus and The Dirty Sexy Boys (Dirty Dango and JTG) / Three-way tag team elimination match; 4 / Pretty Empowered (Ella Envy and Kenzie Paige) defeated Hayley Shadows and Jaylee (with Mercurio) by pinfall / Tag team match; 5 / The Commonwealth Connection (Doug Williams and Harry Smith) defeated The Spectaculars (Rush Freeman and Brady Pierce) (with Rolando Freeman) by pinfall / Tag team match

=== Season 10: Hard Times 3 ===
No.	Title	Taped date	Location	Original air date
83 (S10E1)	"Episode 83"	August 29, 2022	Nashville, TN	August 30, 2022
Matches: No. / Results / Stipulations; 1 / Matt Taven defeated Mecha Wolf by pinfall / Singles match; 2 / The Question Mark (with Aron Stevens) defeated D'Vin Graves by pinfall / Singles match; 3 / Thom Latimer defeated Chris Sainz by pinfall / Singles match; 4 / Rolando Freeman (with Rush Freeman) defeated Matt Cardona (with Mike Knox) by pinfall / No Disqualification match
84 (S10E2)	"Episode 84"	August 29, 2022	Nashville, TN	September 6, 2022
Matches: No. / Results / Stipulations; 1 / Taya Valkyrie defeated KiLynn King, Chelsea Green, and Jennacide by pinfall / Four-way match to determine the number one contender to the NWA World Women's Championship; 2 / EC3 defeated Deonte Marshall by submission / Singles match; 3 / Kamille (c) vs. Allysin Kay ended in a time limit draw / Singles match for the NWA World Women's Championship; 4 / Flip Gordon defeated Doug Williams by pinfall / Singles match; (c) / – the champion(s) heading into the match
85 (S10E3)	"Episode 85"	August 29, 2022	Nashville, TN	September 13, 2022
Matches: No. / Results / Stipulations; 1 / J. R. Kratos and The Pope defeated Black Glove Management (The Question Mark and KC Roxx) (with Aron Stevens) by pinfall / Tag team match; 2 / Cyon (with Austin Idol) defeated Joe Alonzo by pinfall / Singles match; 3 / Roxy and Pretty Empowered (Kenzie Paige and Ella Envy) vs. Max the Impaler, Natalia Markova (Queen Bee), and Angelina Love (with Taryn Terrell) ended in a no contest / Queen Bee match: Stage 1: Six-woman tag team match (Max, Markova, and Love defeated Roxy and Pretty Empowered by pinfall); Stage 2: Three-way elimination match (No contest); 4 / Tyrus (c) (with BLK Jeez) defeated Mims by pinfall / Singles match for the NWA World Television Championship; No Time Limit; (c) / – the champion(s) heading into the match
86 (S10E4)	"Episode 86"	August 29, 2022	Nashville, TN	September 20, 2022
Matches: No. / Results / Stipulations; 1 / Dak Draper defeated Brian Myers by pinfall / NWA National Championship number one contender's tournament semi-final; 2 / Chris Adonis defeated "Magic" Jake Dumas (with Christi Jaynes) by submission / NWA National Championship number one contender's tournament semi-final; 3 / Marshe Rockett (with BLK Jeez) defeated Eric Jackson and Joe Ocasio by pinfall / Three-way match; 4 / Bully Ray and Thom Latimer defeated The Cardona Family (Mike Knox and VSK) (with Matt Cardona) by pinfall / Tag team match
87 (S10E5)	"Episode 87"	August 30, 2022	Nashville, TN	October 4, 2022
Matches: No. / Results / Stipulations; 1 / Odinson defeated Flip Gordon by pinfall / Singles match; 2 / EC3 defeated Traxx by submission / Singles match; 3 / Kamille defeated Jennacide by pinfall / Singles match; 4 / Rhett Titus and The OGK (Matt Taven and Mike Bennett) defeated Damián 666 and La Rebelión (Bestia 666 and Mecha Wolf) by submission / Six-man tag team match
88 (S10E6)	"Episode 88"	August 30, 2022	Nashville, TN	October 11, 2022
Matches: No. / Results / Stipulations; 1 / The Hex (Allysin Kay and Marti Belle) defeated Natalia Markova and Taryn Terrell by pinfall / Tag team match; 2 / The Question Mark II defeated KC Roxx (with Aron Stevens) by pinfall / Singles match; 3 / Dak Draper defeated Chris Adonis and "Thrillbilly" Silas Mason (with Pollo Del Mar) by pinfall / NWA National Championship number one contender's tournament final; 4 / KiLynn King defeated Taya Valkyrie by pinfall / Singles match to determine the number one contender to the NWA World Women's Championship
89 (S10E7)	"Episode 89"	August 30, 2022	Nashville, TN	October 18, 2022
Matches: No. / Results / Stipulations; 1 / Trevor Murdoch defeated Matt Taven by pinfall / Singles match; 2 / The Question Mark (with Aron Stevens) defeated J. R. Kratos by pinfall / Singles match; 3 / Chelsea Green defeated Angelina Love by pinfall / Singles match for Velvet Sky's Champions Series opportunity; 4 / Kerry Morton defeated Joe Alonzo by pinfall / Singles match; 5 / EC3 defeated Mercurio by pinfall / Singles match
90 (S10E8)	"Episode 90"	August 30, 2022	Nashville, TN	November 1, 2022
Matches: No. / Results / Stipulations; 1 / Colby Corino (with Jamie Stanley) defeated Flip Gordon by pinfall / Singles match; 2 / Hawx Aerie (Luke Hawx and PJ Hawx) defeated The Dirty Sexy Boys (Dirty Dango and JTG) by pinfall / Tag team match to determine the number one contender to the NWA World Tag Team Championship; 3 / The Question Mark (with Aron Stevens) vs. The Question Mark II ended in a no contest / Karate Exhibition; 4 / The Spectaculars (Brady Pierce, Rush Freeman, and Rolando Freeman) defeated The Cardona Family (Brian Myers, Mike Knox, and VSK) (with Matt Cardona) / Team War; 5 / Matthew Mims defeated Judais (with Father James Mitchell) and Gustavo Aguilar by pinfall / Three-way match to determine the number one contender to the NWA World Television Championship
91 (S10E9)	"Episode 91"	August 30, 2022	Nashville, TN	November 8, 2022
Matches: No. / Results / Stipulations; 1 / Kamille and KiLynn King defeated The Hex (Allysin Kay and Marti Belle) by pinfall / Tag team match; 2 / Odinson defeated Fodder by pinfall / Singles match; 3 / Taya Valkyrie defeated Madi Wrenkowski by pinfall / Singles match; 4 / Doug Williams, J. R. Kratos, and The Pope vs. Trevor Murdoch, Tyrus, and Thom Latimer ended in a no contest / Six-man tag team match

=== Season 11: Nuff Said ===
No.	Title	Taped date	Location	Original air date
92 (S11E1)	"Revolution Rumble – Part 1, Episode 92"	November 13, 2022	Chalmette, LA	November 15, 2022
Matches: No. / Results / Stipulations; 1 / Jordan Clearwater (c) vs. Mims ended in a time limit draw / Singles match for the NWA World Television Championship; 2 / Odinson defeated Ryan Davidson by pinfall / Singles match; 3 / J. R. Kratos defeated Aron Stevens by disqualification / Singles match; (c) / – the champion(s) heading into the match
93 (S11E2)	"Revolution Rumble – Part 2, Episode 93"	November 13, 2022	Chalmette, LA	November 22, 2022
Matches: No. / Results / Stipulations; 1 / Thom Latimer and Danny Flamingo defeated EC3 and Matt Lancie (with Hard Body Harper) by submission / Tag team match; 2 / Chuck Devine (c) defeated Nate Bradley by pinfall / Singles match for the WildKat Revolution Championship; 3 / Cyon (with Austin Idol) defeated "Thrillbilly" Silas Mason by pinfall / Singles match; 4 / Kamille (c) defeated Jazmin Allure by pinfall / Singles match for the NWA World Women's Championship; (c) / – the champion(s) heading into the match
94 (S11E3)	"Revolution Rumble – Part 3, Episode 94"	November 13, 2022	Chalmette, LA	November 29, 2022
Matches: No. / Results / Stipulations; 1 / Blunt Force Trauma (Carnage and Damage) (with Aron Stevens) defeated David Powers and Eddie Vero by pinfall / Tag team match; 2 / KiLynn King defeated Samantha Starr (with Baby Doll) by pinfall / Singles match; 3 / The Spectaculars (Brady Pierce and Ruch Freeman) (with Rolando Freeman) defeated The Cardona Family (Matt Cardona and Mike Knox) by disqualification / Tag team match Since The Spectaculars won, Rolando will immediately challenge Cardona for his NWA Worlds Heavyweight Championship opportunity. Had The Cardona Family won, they would've gotten five minutes in the ring alone with Rolando.; 4 / Matt Cardona (with Mike Knox) defeated Rolando Freeman (with Brady Pierce and Rush Freeman) by pinfall / Singles match for Cardona's NWA Worlds Heavyweight Championship opportunity
95 (S11E4)	"The Champions Series – Part 1, Episode 95"	TBA	Nashville, TN	December 6, 2022
The team in this episode are: Team Tyrus (captained by NWA Worlds Heavyweight Champion Tyrus): EC3, "Thrillbilly" Silas Mason, Carnage, Allysin Kay, and Kayla Kassidy (Alternate TBD); Team Brickhouse (by NWA World Women's Champion Kamille): Thom Latimer, J. R. Kratos, The Question Mark II, Samantha Starr, and Madi Wrenkowski (Alternate TBD); Team Great (captained by NWA National Champion Cyon): Bully Ray, Judais, PJ Hawx, Angelina Love, and Missa Kate (Alternate TBD); Team Fixers (captained by NWA United States Tag Team Champion Jay Bradley): Odinson, Damage, Rush Freeman, KiLynn King, and Marti Belle (Alternate: Wrecking Ball Legursky); The brackets are: Team Tyrus vs. Team Brickhouse; Team Great vs. Team Fixers; Points can be earned by the following means of winning: Submission – 6 points; Pinfall – 5 Points; Countout – 2 points; Draw – 2 points each; Basic Disqualification (Opponent initially disregarding the official's warnings) – 1 point; Extreme Disqualification (Opponent repeatedly disregarding the official's warnings) – 3 points; Matches: No. / Results / Stipulations; 1 / Bully Ray (Team Great) [2] vs. Odinson (Team Fixers) [2] ended in a time limit draw / Singles match, Champions Series First Round Match; 2 / Thom Latimer (Team Brickhouse) [1] defeated EC3 (Team Tyrus) [0] by basic disqualification / Singles match, Champions Series First Round Match; 3 / EC3 (Team Tyrus) [3] defeated Thom Latimer (Team Brickhouse) [1] by extreme disqualification / Singles match, Champions Series First Round Match; 4 / Rolando Freeman defeated Anthony Andrews, Sal the Pal, and Jeremiah Plunkett by pinfall / Four-way elimination match, Champions Series Alternates Showcase Match; Since Freeman won, he will get to personally pick which team he will represent, while the rest of the field will have their team randomly decided. Andrews was selected for Team Gold, Sal was selected for Team Great, Plunkett was selected for Team Brickhouse, and Freeman elected to be on Team Tyrus.; 5 / Judais and PJ Hawx (Team Great) [7] defeated Damage and Rush Freeman (Team Fixers) [2] by pinfall / Tag team match, Champions Series First Round Match; 6 / "Thrillbilly" Silas Mason (Team Tyrus) [8] defeated J. R. Kratos (Team Brickhouse) [1] by pinfall / Singles match, Champions Series First Round Match
96 (S11E5)	"The Champions Series – Part 2, Episode 96"	TBA	Nashville, TN	December 13, 2022
The team in this episode are: Team Pretty (captained by NWA World Women's Tag Team Champion Kenzie Paige): Trevor Murdoch, Rhett Titus, Luke Hawx, La Rosa Negra, and Ella Envy (Alternate: Aron Stevens); Team Rock 'n' Roll (captained by NWA World Junior Heavyweight Champion Kerry Morton): Dak Draper, Mims, Alex Taylor, Taya Valkyrie, and Jennacide (Alternate: Ricky Morton); Team Rebelión (captained by NWA World Tag Team Champion Mecha Wolf): Jax Dane, Colby Corino, Joe Alonzo, Max the Impaler, and Ashley D'Amboise (Alternate: Bestia 666); Team Gold (captained by NWA World Television Champion Jordan Clearwater): Chris Adonis, AJ Cazana, Mercurio, Natalia Markova, and Roxy (Alternate: Anthony Andrews); The brackets are: Team Gold vs. Team Rebelión; Team Pretty vs. Team Rock 'n' Roll; Matches: No. / Results / Stipulations; 1 / Trevor Murdoch and Rhett Titus (Team Pretty) [5] defeated Dak Draper and Mims (Team Rock 'n' Roll) [0] by pinfall / Tag team match, Champions Series First Round Match; 2 / Chris Adonis (Team Gold) [3] defeated Jax Dane (Team Rebelión) [0] by extreme disqualification / Singles match, Champions Series First Round Match; 3 / Alex Taylor (Team Rock 'n' Roll) [5] defeated Luke Hawx (Team Pretty) [5] by pinfall / Singles match, Champions Series First Round Match; 4 / Colby Corino (Team Rebelión) [6] defeated AJ Cazana (Team Gold) [3] by submission / Singles match, Champions Series First Round Match
97 (S11E6)	"The Champions Series – Part 3, Episode 97"	TBA	Nashville, TN	December 20, 2022
The teams are: Team Tyrus: Trevor Murdoch, EC3, "Thrillbilly" Silas Mason, Carnage, Allysin Kay, Samantha Starr, and Kayla Kassidy (Alternate: Rolando Freeman); Team Rebelión: Jax Dane, Colby Corino, Odinson, Joe Alonzo, KiLynn King, Max the Impaler, and Ashley D'Amboise (Alternate: Bestia 666); Team Great: Bully Ray, Thom Latimer, Judais, PJ Hawx, Angelina Love, Natalia Markova, and Missa Kate (Alternate: Sal the Pal); Team Rock 'n' Roll: Chris Adonis, Dak Draper, Mims, Alex Taylor, Taya Valkyrie, Jennacide, and Madi Wrenkowski (Alternate: Ricky Morton); The brackets are: Team Tyrus vs. Team Rebelión; Team Great vs. Team Rock 'n' Roll; Matches: No. / Results / Stipulations; 1 / Trevor Murdoch (Team Tyrus) [2] vs. Jax Dane (Team Rebelión) [2] ended in a time limit draw / Singles match, Champions Series Semi-final Match; 2 / Bully Ray, Judais, and Thom Latimer (Team Great) [5] defeated Chris Adonis, Dak Draper, and Mims (Team Rock 'n' Roll) [0] by pinfall / Six-man tag team match, Champions Series Semi-final Match; 3 / KiLynn King (Team Rebelión) [8] defeated Allysin Kay (Team Tyrus) [2] by submission / Singles match, Champions Series Semi-final Match; 4 / Alex Taylor (Team Rock 'n' Roll) [5] defeated PJ Hawx (Team Great) [5] by pinfall / Singles match, Champions Series Semi-final Match
98 (S11E7)	"SuperPowerrr, Episode 98"	TBA	Nashville, TN	December 27, 2022
Matches: No. / Results / Stipulations; 1 / Jordan Clearwater (c) (with Austin Idol and BLK Jeez) defeated Mercurio by pinfall / Singles match for the NWA World Television Championship; 2 / The Mortons (Ricky Morton and Kerry Morton) defeated The Fixers (Jay Bradley and Wrecking Ball Legursky) by pinfall / Tag team match; 3 / Jeremiah Plunkett (with Danny Dealz) defeated Garrisaon Creed and Traxx by pinfall / Three-way match; 4 / Damage (with Aron Stevens) defeated The Question Mark II by pinfall / Singles match; 5 / Kamille defeated Kenzie Paige by disqualification / Singles match; 6 / IdolMania Sports Management (Tyrus, Cyon, and Jordan Clearwater) (with BLK Jeez) defeated La Rebelión (Bestia 666 and Mecha Wolf) and Joe Alonzo by pinfall / Six-man tag team match; (c) / – the champion(s) heading into the match
99 (S11E8)	"The Champions Series – Part 4, Episode 99"	TBA	Nashville, TN	January 3, 2022
Matches: No. / Results / Stipulations; 1 / EC3, Carnage, and "Thrillbilly" Silas Mason (Team Tyrus) [8] defeated Colby Corino, Odinson, and Joe Alonzo (Team Rebelión) [8] by submission / Six-man tag team match, Champions Series Semi-final Match; 2 / Taya Valkyrie (Team Rock n' Roll) [6] defeated Angelina Love (Team Great) [5] by basic disqualification / Singles match, Champions Series Semi-final Match; 3 / Taya Valkyrie (Team Rock n' Roll) [11] defeated Angelina Love (Team Great) [5] by pinfall / Singles match, Champions Series Semi-final Match; 4 / Samantha Starr and Kayla Kassidy (Team Tyrus) [13] defeated Max the Impaler and Ashley D'Amboise (Team Rebelión) [8] by pinfall / Tag team match, Champions Series Semi-final Match; 5 / Natalia Markova and Missa Kate (Team Great) [11] defeated Madi Wrenkowski and Jennacide (Team Rock n' Roll) [11] by submission / Tag team match, Champions Series Semi-final Match; 6 / The Mortons (Ricky Morton and Kerry Morton) (Team Rock n' Roll) [16] defeated Cyon and Sal the Pall (Team Great) [11] by pinfall / Tag team match, Champions Series Semi-final Match
100 (S11E9)	"NWA Powerrr Live, Episode 100"	January 31, 2023	Knoxville, TN	January 31, 2023
Matches: No. / Results / Stipulations; 1 / Odinson defeated Bully Ray by disqualification / No Tables match; 2 / The Country Gentlemen (AJ Cazana and Anthony Andrews) defeated The Fixers (Jay Bradley and Wrecking Ball Legursky) (c) by pinfall / Tag team match for the NWA United States Tag Team Championship; 3 / Kenzie Paige defeated Charlette Renegade by pinfall / Singles match; 4 / Team Rock n' Roll (Chris Adonis, Dak Draper, Mims, Alex Taylor, Taya Valkyrie, La Rosa Negra, and Madi Wrenkowski) (with Kerry Morton and Ricky Morton) defeated Team Tyrus (Trevor Murdoch, EC3, "Thrillbilly" Silas Mason, Carnage, Allysin Kay, Robyn Renegade, and Samantha Starr) (with Tyrus, BLK Jeez and Rolando Freeman) / Ultimate Team War, Champions Series Finals; (c) / – the champion(s) heading into the match
101 (S11E10)	"Episode 101"	January 31, 2023	Knoxville, TN	February 7, 2023
Matches: No. / Results / Stipulations; 1 / J. R. Kratos defeated "Thrillbilly" Silas Mason (with Pollo Del Mar) by pinfall / Singles match; 2 / The Renegade Twins (Charlette Renegade and Robyn Renegade) defeated Pretty Empowered (Ella Envy and Roxy) (with Kenzie Paige) by pinfall / Tag team match Paige handcuffed to the ring post Since the Renegade Twins won, they earned an NWA World Women's Tag Team Championship match at Nuff Said.; 3 / Jordan Clearwater (c) (with BLK Jeez) vs. Mims ended in a time limit draw / Singles match for the NWA World Television Championship; This was Mims' Champions Series cash-in match.; 4 / Thom Latimer defeated Jax Dane (with Chris Silvio, Esq.) by technical submission / Singles match; 5 / Tyrus and Blunt Force Trauma (Carnage and Damage) (with Aron Stevens and BLK Jeez) defeated Rolando Freeman and The Cardona Family (Matt Cardona and Mike Knox) by pinfall / Six-man tag team match Since Tyrus' team won, he chose the stipulation for the NWA Worlds Heavyweight Championship match at Nuff Said (one-fall, no one allowed at ringside). Had Cardona's team won, he would've chosen the stipulation.; (c) / – the champion(s) heading into the match

=== Season 12: NWA 312 ===
No.	Title	Taped date	Location	Original air date
102 (S12E1)	"Episode 102"	February 12, 2023	Tampa, FL	February 14, 2023
Matches: No. / Results / Stipulations; 1 / Thom Latimer defeated Jordan Clearwater (c) (with Austin Idol) by submission / Singles match for the NWA World Television Championship; 2 / La Rosa Negra defeated Angelina Love by pinfall / Singles match; 3 / La Rebelión (Bestia 666 and Mecha Wolf) defeated The Mortons (Ricky Morton and Kerry Morton) by pinfall / Tag team match; 4 / Tyrus (c) defeated Rolando Freeman by pinfall / Singles match for the NWA Worlds Heavyweight Championship; (c) / – the champion(s) heading into the match
103 (S12E2)	"Episode 103"	February 12, 2023	Tampa, FL	February 21, 2023
Matches: No. / Results / Stipulations; 1 / Mile High Muscle (Dak Draper and Mims) defeated Blunt Force Trauma (Carnage and Damage) (with Aron Stevens) by disqualification / Tag team match; 2 / Cyon (c) (with Austin Idol) vs. J. R. Kratos ended in a time limit draw / Singles match for the NWA National Championship; 3 / Matt Cardona defeated Odinson by pinfall / Singles match; 4 / Pretty Empowered 2.0 (Ella Envy and Roxy) defeated The Renegade Twins (Charlette Renegade and Robyn Renegade) (c) by pinfall / Tag team match for the NWA World Women's Tag Team Championship; 5 / Madi Wrenkowski and Missa Kate defeated Pretty Empowered 2.0 (Ella Envy and Roxy) (c) by pinfall / Tag team match for the NWA World Women's Tag Team Championship; This was Wrenkowski's Champion Series cash-in match.; (c) / – the champion(s) heading into the match
104 (S12E3)	"Episode 104"	February 12, 2023	Tampa, FL	February 28, 2023
Matches: No. / Results / Stipulations; 1 / Fodder (with Angelina Love) defeated VHS by pinfall / Singles match; 2 / Kenzie Paige defeated KiLynn King by pinfall / NWA Women's Television Championship Tournament qualifying match; 3 / Bully Ray vs. Mike Knox ended in a no contest / Singles match
105 (S12E4)	"Episode 105"	February 12, 2023	Tampa, FL	March 7, 2023
Matches: No. / Results / Stipulations; 1 / Trevor Murdoch defeated Beast Mode by disqualification / Singles match; 2 / EC3 (with BLK Jeez) defeated Dontae Smiley by pinfall / Singles match; 3 / Sal the Pal vs. Gaagz the Gymp ended in a double countout / Hair vs. Mask match; 4 / Kamille defeated Ruthie Jay by pinfall / Singles match
106 (S12E5)	"Episode 106"	February 13, 2023	Tampa, FL	March 14, 2023
Matches: No. / Results / Stipulations; 1 / Kenzie Paige defeated Ashley D'Amboise by pinfall / NWA Women's Television Championship Tournament Semi-final; 2 / Mike Knox defeated Stacee Alexander by pinfall / Singles match; 3 / Thom Latimer (c) defeated Rhett Titus by submission / Singles match for the NWA World Television Championship; 4 / Kerry Morton defeated Mecha Wolf by pinfall / Singles match; (c) / – the champion(s) heading into the match
107 (S12E6)	"Episode 107"	February 13, 2023	Tampa, FL	March 21, 2023
Matches: No. / Results / Stipulations; 1 / "Thrillbilly" Silas Mason (with Pollo Del Mar) defeated Brady Pierce (with Rush Freeman and Rolando Freeman) by pinfall / Singles match; 2 / Trevor Murdoch vs. Daisy Kill and Talos ended in a no contest / Unsanctioned handicap match; 3 / Max the Impaler (with Father James Mitchell) defeated Taya Valkyrie by pinfall / NWA Women's Television Championship Tournament Semi-final
108 (S12E7)	"Episode 108"	February 13, 2023	Tampa, FL	March 28, 2023
Matches: No. / Results / Stipulations; 1 / J. R. Kratos defeated Jordan Clearwater and "Magic" Jake Dumas by pinfall / Three-way match; 2 / Magnum Muscle (Matthew Mims and Dak Draper) vs. Blunt Force Trauma (Carnage and Damage) ended in a no contest / Tag team match for Draper's Champions Series title opportunity Aron Stevens banned from ringside.; 3 / Joe Alonzo (with Jamie Stanley) defeated Alex Taylor (with Danny Dealz) by pinfall / Singles match to determine the number one contender for the NWA World Junior Heavyweight Championship; Since Taylor lost, The Ill Begotten would dissolve.; 4 / EC3 and BLK Jeez defeated Tyrus and Eric Jackson by pinfall / Tag team match
109 (S12E8)	"Episode 109"	February 13, 2023	Tampa, FL	April 4, 2023
Matches: No. / Results / Stipulations; 1 / Pretty Empowered (Ella Envy and Roxy) defeated KiLynn King and Samantha Starr by pinfall / Tag team match; 2 / Homicide defeated Salazar de la Muerte by pinfall / Singles match; 3 / "Thrillbilly" Silas Mason (with Pollo Del Mar) defeated J. R. Kratos by referee stoppage / Singles match; 4 / Aron Stevens defeated Rolando Freeman by pinfall / Titanic Tampa Street Fight

=== Season 13: Crockett Cup 2023 ===
No.	Title	Taped date	Location	Original air date
–	"NWA 312 Recap"	April 7, 2023	Highland Park, IL	April 11, 2023
Matches: No. / Results / Stipulations; 1 / Gaagz the Gymp defeated Sal the Pal by pinfall / Hair vs. Mask Strap match Judais was the special guest enforcer.; 2 / "Thrillbilly" Silas Mason won by last eliminating Odinson; Participants in order of elimination: Jordan Clearwater, Chico Suave, Mario Pardua, Cody James, The Real Drago, Jackpot Dinero, Vik Dalishus, Hale Collins, Super Beast, Matt Vine, Mercurio, Rhett Titus, Wrecking Ball Legursky, Alex Taylor, Jeremiah Plunkett, Brady Pierce, PJ Hawx, "Magic" Jake Dumas, Rush Freeman, Jay Bradley, Rolando Freeman, Fodder, Homicide, and Eric Jackson. / Bob Luce Memorial Battle Royal to determine the number one contender to the NWA National Heavyweight Championship; 3 / J. R. Kratos defeated Yabo the Clown by pinfall / Singles match
110 (S13E2)	"Episode 110"	April 8, 2023	Highland Park, IL	April 18, 2023
Matches: No. / Results / Stipulations; 1 / Thom Latimer (c) defeated Fodder (with Angelina Love) by submission / Singles match for the NWA World Television Championship; 2 / Natalia Markova defeated La Rosa Negra by pinfall / Singles match; 3 / Kerry Morton (c) defeated Joe Alonzo (with Jamie Stanley) by pinfall / Singles match for the NWA World Junior Heavyweight Championship; (c) / – the champion(s) heading into the match
111 (S13E3)	"Episode 111"	April 8, 2023	Highland Park, IL	April 25, 2023
Matches: No. / Results / Stipulations; 1 / The SVGS (Jax Dane and Blake "Bulletproof" Troop) (with Chris Sivilo, Esq.) defeated Daisy Kill and Talos by pinfall / 2023 Crockett Cup Qualifying match; 2 / Kenzie Paige (c) defeated Ella Envy by pinfall / Singles match for the NWA World Women's Television Championship; 3 / Mike Knox and Trevor Murdoch defeated The Fixers (Jay Bradley and Wrecking Ball Legursky) by pinfall / 2023 Crockett Cup Qualifying match; 4 / "Thrillbilly" Silas Mason (with Pollo Del Mar) defeated Odinson by pinfall / Singles match for Mason's NWA National Heavyweight Championship opportunity; (c) / – the champion(s) heading into the match
112 (S13E4)	"Episode 112"	April 8, 2023	Highland Park, IL	May 2, 2023
Matches: No. / Results / Stipulations; 1 / EC3 (c) defeated Carnage (with Aron Stevens) by submission / Singles match for the NWA National Heavyweight Championship; 2 / M95 (Madi Wrenkowski and Missa Kate) (c) defeated The Hollywood Blondes (Ray Lyn and Heather Monroe) by pinfall / Tag team match for the NWA World Women's Tag Team Championship; 3 / Chris Adonis (with Tyrus) defeated Cyon (with Austin Idol) by pinfall / Singles match; 4 / Kamille vs. Natalia Markova ended in a time limit draw / Singles match; (c) / – the champion(s) heading into the match
113 (S13E5)	"Episode 113"	April 8, 2023	Highland Park, IL	May 9, 2023
Matches: No. / Results / Stipulations; 1 / Thom Latimer (c) vs. EC3 ended in a time limit draw / Singles match for the NWA World Television Championship; 2 / Yabo the Clown defeated Ricky Morton by pinfall / Singles match; 3 / Bully Ray defeated Daisy Kill by pinfall / Singles match; 4 / Chris Adonis and Tyrus vs. Blunt Force Trauma (Carnage and Damage) (with Aron Stevens) ended in a double countout / Tag team match; (c) / – the champion(s) heading into the match
114 (S13E6)	"Episode 114"	April 8, 2023	Highland Park, IL	May 16, 2023
Matches: No. / Results / Stipulations; 1 / Kenzie Paige (c) defeated Sierra by pinfall / Singles match for the NWA World Women's Television Championship; 2 / Kratos and Odinson defeated Idolmania Sports Management (Cyon and Jordan Clearwater) by pinfall / Tag team match; 3 / Alex Taylor defeated Koa Laxamana and Fodder (with Angelina Love) by pinfall / Three-way match; 4 / Pretty Empowered (Ella Envy and Roxy) defeated La Rosa Negra and Labrava Escobar by pinfall / Tag team match; (c) / – the champion(s) heading into the match
115 (S13E7)	"Episode 115"	April 8, 2023	Highland Park, IL	May 23, 2023
Matches: No. / Results / Stipulations; 1 / Blake "Bulletproof" Troop (with Chris Silvio, Esq.) defeated Talos by pinfall / Singles match; 2 / La Rebelión (Bestia 666 and Mecha Wolf) (c) vs. Magnum Muscle (Dak Draper and Mims) ended in a no contest / Tag team match for the NWA World Tag Team Championship; 3 / Kerry Morton defeated Jeremiah Plunkett by pinfall / Singles match; (c) / – the champion(s) heading into the match
116 (S13E8)	"Episode 116"	April 8, 2023	Highland Park, IL	May 30, 2023
Matches: No. / Results / Stipulations; 1 / The Country Gentlemen (AJ Cazana and Anthony Andrews) vs. Mike Knox and Trevor Murdoch ended in a no contest / Tag team match; 2 / The NOW (Hale Collins and Vik Dalishus) defeated Mario Pardua and Ryan Matthews ended in a pinfall / 2023 Crockett Cup Qualifying match; 3 / Samantha Starr defeated Kylie Paige by pinfall / Singles match; 4 / The Handsome Bastards (Mercurio and "Magic" Jake Dumas) (with Christi Jaynes) defeated America's Ego (Jamie Stanley and Joe Alonzo) by pinfall / 2023 Crockett Cup Qualifying match

=== Season 14: NWA 75 ===
No.	Title	Taped date	Location	Original air date
117 (S14E1)	"Episode 117"	July 9, 2023	Highland Park, IL	July 11, 2023
Matches: No. / Results / Stipulations; 1 / The Brothers of Funstruction (Yabo and Ruffo) defeated La Rebelión (Bestia 666 and Mecha Wolf) (with Vampiro) by pinfall / Tag team match; 2 / Ricky Morton (with Kerry Morton) defeated Koa Laxamana (with Kallies) by pinfall / Singles match; 3 / Zyon (with Austin Idol) defeated Rolando Freeman by pinfall / Singles match; 4 / Natalia Markova and Pretty Empowered (Ella Envy, Kylie Paige and Roxy) defeated Kamille, Ruthie Jay and M95 (Madi Wrenkowski and Missa Kate) by pinfall / Eight-woman tag team match; 5 / EC3 (c) defeated "Thrillbilly" Silas Mason (with Pollo Del Mar) by pinfall / Singles match for the NWA National Heavyweight Championship; (c) / – the champion(s) heading into the match
118 (S14E2)	"Episode 118"	July 9, 2023	Highland Park, IL	July 18, 2023
Matches: No. / Results / Stipulations; 1 / Colby Corino defeated Alex Taylor (with Danny Dealz) by pinfall / Singles match; 2 / Thom Latimer (c) defeated Mario Pardua (with C-Red) by pinfall / Singles match for the NWA World Television Championship; 3 / Daisy Kill and Talos defeated Magic Inc. (Cody James and "Magic" Jake Dumas) (with CJ) by pinfall / NWA United States Tag Team Championship Showdown first round; 4 / The Fixers (Jay Bradley and Wrecking Ball Legursky) (with Matt Vine) defeated The Spectaculars (Brady Pierce and Rush Freeman) by pinfall / NWA United States Tag Team Championship Showdown first round; 5 / Kenzie Paige (c) defeated Samantha Starr by pinfall / Singles match for the NWA World Women's Television Championship; (c) / – the champion(s) heading into the match
119 (S14E3)	"Episode 119"	July 9, 2023	Highland Park, IL	July 25, 2023
Matches: No. / Results / Stipulations; 1 / Carnage (with Aron Stevens) defeated Jax Dane (with Chris Silvio Esq.) by countout / Singles match; 2 / Knox and Murdoch (Mike Knox and Trevor Murdoch) defeated The Alpha Kings (Schaff and Russ Jones) by pinfall / Tag team match; 3 / Blake "Bulletproof" Troop (with Chris Silvio Esq.) defeated Mims by referee stoppage / Singles match; 4 / Jordan Clearwater and Odinson defeated The Country Gentlemen (Anthony Andrews and AJ Cazana) by pinfall / Tag team match; 5 / Kerry Morton (c) (with Ricky Morton) defeated Matt Vine by pinfall / Singles match for the NWA World Junior Heavyweight Championship; (c) / – the champion(s) heading into the match
120 (S14E4)	"Episode 120"	July 9, 2023	Highland Park, IL	August 1, 2023
Matches: No. / Results / Stipulations; 1 / Chris Adonis defeated Damage (with Aron Stevens) and Dak Draper by referee stoppage / Three-way match; 2 / Judais defeated Gaagz the Gymp by technical submission (Note: Sal the Pal threw in the towel on the behalf of Gaagz the Gymp, thus ending the match in a technical submission victory.) / Submission match; 3 / Fodder and Joe Alonzo (with Angelina Love) defeated Robert Anthony and Eric Jackson by pinfall / Tag team match; 4 / Kenzie Paige (c) vs. Angelina Love ended in a time limit draw / Singles match for the NWA World Women's Television Championship; 5 / "Thrillbilly" Silas Mason (with Ricky Morton and Alex Taylor) defeated Koa Laxamana (with Kallies) by pinfall / Singles match; (c) / – the champion(s) heading into the match
121 (S14E5)	"Episode 121"	July 9, 2023	Highland Park, IL	August 8, 2023
Matches: No. / Results / Stipulations; 1 / Ella Envy (with Roxy) defeated Missa Kate (with Madi Wrenkowski) by pinfall / Singles match Since Envy won, Pretty Empowered earns an NWA World Women's Tag Team Championship match at NWA 75.; 2 / Anthony Andrews defeated Cody James (with CJ) by pinfall / Singles match; 3 / Magnum Muscle (Dak Draper and Mims) defeated SVGS (Jax Dane and Blake "Bulletproof" Troop) (with Chris Silvio, Esq.) by pinfall / Tag team match; 4 / Odinson defeated Zyon (with Austin Idol) by disqualification / Singles match; 5 / Vampiro and La Rebelión (Bestia 666 and Mecha Wolf) defeated Mario Pardua and The Brothers of Funstruction (Yabo and Ruffo) by pinfall / Six-man tag team match
122 (S14E6)	"Episode 122"	July 9, 2023	Highland Park, IL	August 15, 2023
Matches: No. / Results / Stipulations; 1 / The Southern 6 (Kerry Morton and Alex Taylor) defeated Colby Corino and Joe Alonzo by pinfall / Tag team match; 2 / Talos defeated Judais by pinfall / Singles match; 3 / Magic Inc. ("Magic" Jake Dumas and CJ) defeated AJ Cazana and Natalia Markova by pinfall / Intergender tag team match; 4 / Kamille defeated Kylie Paige by pinfall / Singles match; 5 / Blunt Force Trauma (Carnage and Damage) defeated EC3 and Jordan Clearwater (with C-Red) by pinfall / Tag team match
123 (S14E7)	"Episode 123"	July 9, 2023	Highland Park, IL	August 22, 2023
Matches: No. / Results / Stipulations; 1 / The Fixers, LLC (Jay Bradley, Matt Vine and Wrecking Bull Legursky) defeated The Spectaculars (Brady Pierce, Rolando Freeman & Rush Freeman) by pinfall / Six-man tag team match; 2 / The Outrunners (Turbo Floyd and Turbo Magnum) defeated Eric Jackson and Fodder (with Angelina Love) by pinfall / Tag team match; 3 / Daisy Kill defeated Robert Anthony and Jeremiah Plunkett by pinfall / No Disqualification three-way match; 4 / Samantha Starr defeated Ruthie Jay by pinfall / Singles match; 5 / Knox and Murdoch (Trevor Murdoch and Mike Knox) defeated Strictly Business (Thom Latimer and Chris Adonis) 2–0 / 2-out-of-3 falls match

=== Season 15: Samhain ===
No.	Title	Taped date	Location	Original air date
124 (S15E2)	"The New Era"	August 28, 2023	Nashville, TN	September 5, 2023
Matches: No. / Results / Stipulations; 1 / Max the Impaler (with Father James Mitchell) (c) defeated Taylor Rising by pinfall / Singles match for the NWA World Women's Television Championship; 2 / The Immortals (J. R. Kratos and Odinson) defeated The Outrunners (Truth Magnum and Turbo Floyd) by pinfall / Tag team match; 3 / Brady Pierce defeated Rolando Freeman by pinfall / Singles match; 4 / The Southern 6 (Kerry Morton, Alex Taylor, and "Thrillbilly" Silas Mason) defeated The Fixers, LLC (Wrecking Ball Legursky, Matt Vine, and The Fixer) by pinfall / Six-man tag team match; (c) / – the champion(s) heading into the match
125 (S15E3)	"New Era, Old Problems"	August 28, 2023	Nashville, TN	September 12, 2023
Matches: No. / Results / Stipulations; 1 / Zicky Dice defeated Judais, Dak Draper, and Gaagz the Gymp by pinfall / NWA World Television Championship Qualifier Match; 2 / Jax Dane defeated AJ Cazana by submission / Singles match; 3 / Homicide and Joe Alonzo (with Jamie Stanley) defeated Colby Corino and Koa Laxamana (with Kallies) by pinfall / Tag team match Ricky Morton was the special guest referee; 4 / Kenzie Paige (c) defeated Samantha Starr by pinfall / Singles match for the NWA World Women's Championship; (c) / – the champion(s) heading into the match
126 (S15E4)	"The Dark Carnival"	August 28, 2023	Nashville, TN	September 19, 2023
Matches: No. / Results / Stipulations; 1 / Ruthie Jay defeated Natalia Markova and Missa Kate by pinfall / Three-way match to determine the number one contender to the NWA World Women's Championship; 2 / Zyon defeated Boz by submission / Singles match; 3 / Thom Latimer defeated Rush Freeman (with Rolando Freeman) by submission / Singles match; 4 / Magic Inc. (Cody James and "Magic" Jake Dumas) (with CJ) defeated La Rebelión (Bestia 666 and Mecha Wolf) (with Vampiro) by pinfall / Tag team match
127 (S15E5)	"The G Gets The Love"	August 28, 2023	Nashville, TN	September 26, 2023
Matches: No. / Results / Stipulations; 1 / Mims defeated Blake "Bulletproof' Troop (with Chris Silvio Esq.), Chris Adonis, and Jordan Clearwater by pinfall / NWA World Television Championship Qualifier Match; 2 / Kamille defeated Madi by pinfall / Singles match; 3 / Daisy Kill and Talos (c) defeated The Brothers of Funstruction (Ruffo and Yabo) (with Violent J) by pinfall / Tag team match for the NWA United States Tag Team Championship; 4 / EC3 (C) defeated Jay Bradley by submission / Singles match for the NWA Worlds Heavyweight Championship; 5 / Blunt Force Trauma (Carnage and Damage) (c) (with Aron Stevens) defeated Knox and Murdoch by disqualification / Tag team match for the NWA World Tag Team Championship; (c) / – the champion(s) heading into the match
128 (S15E6)	"Keep Your Enemies Close"	August 29, 2023	Nashville, TN	October 3, 2023
Matches: No. / Results / Stipulations; 1 / Taylor Rising and Natalia Markova defeated M95 (Madi and Missa Kate) by submission / Tag team match to determine the #1 contenders to the NWA World Women's Tag Team Championship; 2 / Colby Corino (c) defeated Matt Vine by pinfall / Singles match for the NWA World Junior Heavyweight Championship; 3 / Jax Dane defeated Chris Silvio, Esq. by submission / Singles match; 4 / "Thrillbilly" Silas Mason (c) defeated Dak Draper by pinfall / Singles match for the NWA National Heavyweight Championship; (c) / – the champion(s) heading into the match
129 (S15E7)	"When TV Stars Align"	August 29, 2023	Nashville, TN	October 10, 2023
Matches: No. / Results / Stipulations; 1 / Mims defeated Zicky Dice by pinfall / Singles match for the vacant NWA World Television Championship; 2 / The Southern 6 (Kerry Morton and Alex Taylor) defeated The Spectaculars (Rush Freeman and Rolando Freeman) by pinfall / Tag team match; 3 / Judais (with Father James Mitchell) defeated Sal the Pal by disqualification / Singles match; 4 / Daisy Kill and Talos (c) defeated The Country Gentlemen (KC Cazana and AJ Cazana) by pinfall / Tag team match for the NWA United States Tag Team Championship; 5 / The Immortals (Odinson and Kratos) defeated Daisy Kill and Talos (c) by countout / Tag team match for the NWA United States Tag Team Championship; (c) / – the champion(s) heading into the match
130 (S15E8)	"Musical Chairs"	August 29, 2023	Nashville, TN	October 17, 2023
Matches: No. / Results / Stipulations; 1 / Yabo the Clown (with Violent J) defeated Mecha Wolf (with Vampiro) by pinfall / Pick Your Poison match Winner gets to choose the stipulation for their match at Samhain.; 2 / Thom Latimer (with Kamille) defeated Koa Laxamana (with Kallies Malia) by pinfall / Singles match; 3 / Max the Impaler (c) (with Father James Mitchell) defeated MJ Jenkins by pinfall / Singles match for the NWA World Women's Television Championship; 4 / Chris Adonis defeated Zyon by disqualification / Singles match to determine the #1 contender to the NWA National Heavyweight Championship; Austin Idol banned from ringside; (c) / – the champion(s) heading into the match
131 (S15E9)	"See You In Hell!"	August 29, 2023	Nashville, TN	October 24, 2023
Matches: No. / Results / Stipulations; 1 / Jordan Clearwater and EC3 defeated Luscious Lawrence and Kal Herro by submission / Tag team match; 2 / Knox and Murdoch defeated The Fixers (Jay Bradley and Wrecking Ball Legursky) by pinfall / Tag team match; 3 / Pretty Empowered (Kenzie Paige, Ella Envy, and Kylie Paige) defeated The WOAD, Ruthie Jay, and Samantha Starr by pinfall / Six-woman tag team match; 4 / Magic Inc. ("Magic" Jake Dumas and Cody James) (with CJ) defeated Mario Pardua and Jeremiah Plunkett by pinfall / tag team match; 5 / Blunt Force Trauma (Carnage and Damage) (with Aron Stevens) defeated KC Roxx, Sodapop Hendrix, and Luke Kurtis by pinfall / Handicap match

=== Season 16: Paranoia ===
No.	Title	Taped date	Location	Original air date
132 (S16E1)	"Samhain In Review"	October 28, 2023	Cleveland, OH	October 31, 2023
Matches: No. / Results / Stipulations; 1 / Rush Freeman defeated Brady Pierce by pinfall / Loser Leaves NWA match Rolando Freeman was the special guest referee; 2 / Violent J and The Brothers of Funstruction (Yabo and Ruffo) defeated Vampiro and La Rebelión (Bestia 666 and Mecha Wolf) (with Jerry Other) by pinfall / "Riddle Box" six-man tag team match; 3 / Kenzie Paige (c) defeated Ruthie Jay by pinfall / Singles match for the NWA World Women's Championship; (c) / – the champion(s) heading into the match
133 (S16E2)	"It's Time To Give Thanks"	November 4, 2023	Nashville, TN	November 7, 2023
Matches: No. / Results / Stipulations; 1 / The Southern 6 (Kerry Morton and Alex Taylor) defeated The Heatseekers (Sigmon and Wlliott Russell) by pinfall / Tag team match; 2 / Max the Impaler (c) (with Father James Mitchell) defeated Missa Kate by pinfall / Singles match for the NWA World Women's Television Championship; 3 / Blunt Force Trauma (Carnage and Damage) (with Aron Stevens) defeated Magic Inc. (Cody James and "Magic" Jake Dumas) (with CJ) by pinfall / Tag team match; 4 / Kenzie Paige defeated Taylor Rising by pinfall / Singles match; (c) / – the champion(s) heading into the match
134 (S16E3)	"Overman vs. Beastman"	November 4, 2023	Nashville, TN	November 14, 2023
Matches: No. / Results / Stipulations; 1 / Colby Corino (c) defeated Mo Jabari by pinfall / Singles match for the NWA World Junior Heavyweight Championship; 2 / Pretty Empowered (Ella Envy and Kylie Paige) (c) defeated The King Bees (Charity King and Danni Bee) by pinfall / Tag team match for the NWA World Women's Tag Team Championship; 3 / Blake "Bulletproof" Troop (with Chris Silvio, Esq.) defeated Koa Laxamana (with Kallies Malia) / Submission match; 4 / EC3 (c) defeated Talos by pinfall / Singles match for the NWA Worlds Heavyweight Championship; (c) / – the champion(s) heading into the match
135 (S16E4)	"Who's the Turkey Now!?"	November 4, 2023	Nashville, TN	November 21, 2023
Matches: No. / Results / Stipulations; 1 / CJ (with Magic Inc. (Cody James and "Magic" Jake Dumas)) defeated Aron Stevens (with The Carnies (Kerry Awful and Nick Iggy)) by submission / "Turkey Gobbler" match Since Stevens lost, he was forced to wear a turkey hat and gobble like a turkey.; 2 / Kylie Paige defeated Big Mama by pinfall / Singles match; 3 / Hunter James and Adrian Thomas defeated The Kidz (Alexander Lev and Jackson Drake) by pinfall / Tag team match; 4 / The Southern 6 ("Thrillbilly" Silas Mason, Kerry Morton, and Alex Taylor) defeated The New Spectaculars 1.0 (Tyler Midas, Rush Freeman, and Rolando Freeman) by pinfall / Six-man tag team match
136 (S16E5)	"Old Friends & Silver Bells"	November 4, 2023	Nashville, TN	November 28, 2023
Matches: No. / Results / Stipulations; 1 / Mims (c) defeated Carson Drake by pinfall / Singles match for the NWA World Television Championship; 2 / Thom Latimer and Kamille defeated Natalia Markova and Bryan Idol by pinfall / Mixed tag team match; 3 / Tiffany Nieves defeated Ruthie Jay by submission / Singles match; 4 / Tim Storm and Jax Dane defeated Trevor Murdoch and Burchill by disqualification / Tag team match; (c) / – the champion(s) heading into the match
137 (S16E6)	"Blood is Thicker than Gold"	November 4, 2023	Nashville, TN	December 5, 2023
Matches: No. / Results / Stipulations; 1 / The Country Gentlemen (AJ Cazana and KC Cazana) (with Joe Cazana) defeated The Slimeballz (Sage Chantz and Tommy Rant) by pinfall / Tag team match; 2 / Max the Impaler (with Father James Mitchell) (c) defeated Chelsea by pinfall / Singles match for the NWA World Women's Television Championship; Since Max retained, they can invoke the Lucky Seven Rule to challenge for the NWA World Women's Championship; 3 / The New Spectaculars 2.0 (Rush Freeman and Slade) (with Rolando Freeman) defeated The Outrunners (Truth Magnum and Turbo Floyd) by pinfall / Tag team match; 4 / Joe Alonzo defeated Rey Fury and Luke Kurtis by pinfall / Three-way match; 5 / "Thrillbilly" Silas Mason (c) defeated Devan Dixon by pinfall / Singles match for the NWA National Heavyweight Championship; (c) / – the champion(s) heading into the match
138 (S16E7)	"Return to Robarts – Part 1"	November 18, 2023	Sarasota, FL	December 12, 2023
Matches: No. / Results / Stipulations; 1 / Daisy Kill and Talos defeated The Heavenly Butterflies (Faboo Andre and Tony Donati) by pinfall / Tag team match; 2 / Colby Corino (c) defeated Joe Ocasio by pinfall / Singles match for the NWA World Junior Heavyweight Championship; 3 / Taylor Rising defeated Airica Demia and Allie Recks by pinfall / Three-way match; 4 / The Brothers of Funstruction (Yabo and Ruffo) (with Violent J) defeated The Immortals (J. R. Kratos and Odinson) (c) by disqualification / Tag team match for the NWA United States Tag Team Championship; (c) / – the champion(s) heading into the match
139 (S16E8)	"Return to Robarts – Part 2"	November 18, 2023	Sarasota, FL	December 19, 2023
Matches: No. / Results / Stipulations; 1 / Mims (c) vs. Dak Draper ended in a time limit draw / Singles match for the NWA World Television Championship; 2 / The Looks That Kill (Bryan Idol and Natalia Markova) defeated The Powerrr Couple (Thom Latimer and Kamille) by pinfall / Mixed tag team street fight; 3 / The Southern 6 (Kerry Morton, Alex Taylor, and "Thrillbilly" Silas Mason) defeated The Miserably Faithful (Judais, Sal Vation, and Gaagz the Gymp) (with Father James Mitchell) by pinfall / Six-man tag team match; (c) / – the champion(s) heading into the match
140 (S16E9)	"Christmas Hangover"	November 4, 2023 & August 27, 2023	Nashville, TN & St. Louis, MO	December 26, 2023
Matches: No. / Results / Stipulations; 1 / The Slimeballz (Sage Chantz and Tommy Rant) won by last eliminating SVGS (Blake "Bulletproof" Troop and Chris Silvio, Esq.); The other teams were: Boz and Eric Jackson, Crucifix and De'Vin Graves, The Outrunners (Truth Magnum and Turbo Floyd), and The Stew Crew (Dylan Stewart & Zach Stewart) / Christmas Wish Battle Royal for a tag team championship match of the winner's choosing The Slimeballz chose to challenge The Immortals (J. R. Kratos and Odinson) for the NWA United States Tag Team Championship; 2 / Missa Kate defeated Sal Vation by pinfall / Intergender match; 3 / Daisy Kill and Talos defeated Carson Drake and Lord Crewe by pinfall / Tag team match; 4 / Kenzie Paige defeated Kamille (c) by pinfall / Singles match for the NWA World Women's Championship; (c) / – the champion(s) heading into the match
141 (S16E10)	"Return to Robarts – Part 3"	November 18, 2023	Sarasota, FL	January 2, 2024
Matches: No. / Results / Stipulations; 1 / Joe Alonzo defeated Alex Misery by pinfall / Singles match; 2 / "Magic" Jake Dumas defeated Anthony Catena (with Chris Silvio, Esq.) and Storm Thomas by pinfall / Three-way match to determine the #1 contender to the NWA World Television Championship; 3 / Blunt Force Trauma (Carnage and Damage) (c) (with Aron Stevens) defeated The Fixers (Jay Bradley and Wrecking Ball Legursky) by pinfall / Tag team match for the NWA World Tag Team Championship; (c) / – the champion(s) heading into the match
142 (S16E11)	"Return to Robarts: Finale"	November 18, 2023	Sarasota, FL	January 9, 2024
Matches: No. / Results / Stipulations; 1 / Kylie Paige (c) defeated Ruthie Jay and Missa Kate by pinfall / Handicap match for the NWA World Women's Tag Team Championship; 2 / Kenzie Paige (c) defeated Miss Starr (with Chelsea) by pinfall / Singles match for the NWA World Women's Championship; 3 / Knox and Murdoch defeated The Country Gentlemen (AJ Cazana and KC Cazana) by pinfall / Tag team match; 4 / EC3 (c) defeated Jax Dane by pinfall / Singles match for the NWA Worlds Heavyweight Championship; (c) / – the champion(s) heading into the match
143 (S16E12)	"Powerrr Retrospective"	N/A	N/A	January 16, 2024
Matches: No. / Results / Stipulations; 1 / La Rebelión (Bestia 666 and Mecha Wolf) (c) defeated The Briscoes (Jay Briscoe and Mark Briscoe) by pinfall / Tag team match for the NWA World Tag Team Championship; 2 / Matt Cardona defeated Trevor Murdoch (c) by pinfall / Singles match for the NWA Worlds Heavyweight Championship; (c) / – the champion(s) heading into the match
144 (S16E13)	"Powerrr Retrospective #2"	N/A	N/A	January 25, 2024
Matches: No. / Results / Stipulations; 1 / Colby Corino (with Jax Dane, Jennacide, and Trevor Murdoch) defeated Sal Rinauro (Kenzie Paige, J. R. Kratos, Mims, and Thom Latimer) by pinfall / 2021 Champions Series Final; 2 / The Rock 'n' Roll Express (Ricky Morton and Robert Gibson) defeated The Wild Cards (Thom Latimer and Royce Isaacs) (c) by pinfall / Tag team match for the NWA World Tag Team Championship; (c) / – the champion(s) heading into the match
145 (S16E14)	"Powerrr Retrospective #3"	N/A	N/A	January 31, 2024
Matches: No. / Results / Stipulations; 1 / Pretty Empowered (Kenzie Paige and Ella Envy) (c) defeated The Hex (Allysin Kay and Marti Belle) by pinfall / Tag team match for the NWA World Women's Tag Team Championship; 2 / Eli Drake defeated Ken Anderson by pinfall / No Disqualification match; (c) / – the champion(s) heading into the match

=== Season 17: Hard Times 4 ===
No.	Title	Taped date	Location	Original air date
144 (S17E1)	"The Golden Door"	January 13, 2024	Fort Lauderdale, FL	February 6, 2024
Matches: No. / Results / Stipulations; 1 / Blunt Force Trauma (Carnage and Damage) (c) (with Aron Stevens) defeated Jax Dane and Tim Storm by pinfall / Tag team match for the NWA World Tag Team Championship; 2 / Kenzie Paige (c) defeated Tiffany Nieves by pinfall / Singles match for the NWA World Women's Championship; 3 / EC3 (c) defeated Matt Cardona by submission / "The Ultimate Match of Death" for the NWA World's Heavyweight Championship; (c) / – the champion(s) heading into the match
145 (S17E2)	"Look Ma! I'm On TV"	January 13, 2024	Fort Lauderdale, FL	February 13, 2024
Matches: No. / Results / Stipulations; 1 / Knox and Murdoch vs. The Southern Six (Kerry Morton and Alex Taylor) (with Ricky Morton) ended in a no contest / Tag team match; 2 / Max the Impaler (Women's) (with Father James Mitchell) defeated Mims (Men's) by pinfall / Unification match for the NWA World Television Championship and the NWA World Women's Television Championship; No time limit, there must be a winner; 3 / The Immortals (Kratos and Odinson) (c) defeated The Slimeballz (Sage Chantz and Tommy Rant) by pinfall / Tag team match for the NWA United States Tag Team Championship; 4 / "Thrillbilly" Silas Mason (c) defeated Burchill by pinfall / Singles match for the NWA National Heavyweight Championship; (c) / – the champion(s) heading into the match
146 (S17E3)	"You Will Know My Name"	January 13, 2024	Fort Lauderdale, FL	February 20, 2024
Matches: No. / Results / Stipulations; 1 / Taylor Rising, Ruthie Jay, and Natalia Markova defeated Miss Starr, CJ, and Missa Kate by pinfall / Six-woman tag team match Whoever earns the winning fall earns an NWA World Women's Championship match. Markova pinned Kate to win.; 2 / Colby Corino (c) defeated Mecha Wolf by pinfall / Singles match for the NWA World Junior Heavyweight Championship; Homicide was the special guest referee.; 3 / Daisy Kill and Talos defeated The New Spectaculars 2.0 (Rush Freeman and Slade) (with Rolando Freeman) by pinfall / Tag team match; 4 / Thom Latimer defeated Bryan Idol by pinfall / Falls Count Anywhere match; (c) / – the champion(s) heading into the match
147 (S17E4)	"Kings & Queens"	January 13, 2024	Fort Lauderdale, FL	February 27, 2024
Matches: No. / Results / Stipulations; 1 / Blake "Bulletproof" Troop (with Chris Silvio, Esq.) defeated Joe Alonzo by referee stoppage / Singles match; 2 / "Magic" Jake Dumas defeated Alex Misery by pinfall / Singles match; 3 / Zyon and Anthony Andrews (with Austin Idol) defeated The Country Gentlemen (AJ Cazana and KC Cazana) (with Joe Cazana) by pinfall / Tag team match; 4 / The King Bees (Charity King and Danni Bee) defeated Pretty Empowered (Ella Envy and Kylie Paige) (c) by pinfall / Tag team match for the NWA World Women's Tag Team Championship; (c) / – the champion(s) heading into the match
148 (S17E5)	"Shout At The Devil"	January 14, 2024	Tampa, FL	March 5, 2024
Matches: No. / Results / Stipulations; 1 / Colby Corino (c) defeated Yabo the Clown by pinfall / Singles match for the NWA World Junior Heavyweight Championship; 2 / Blunt Force Trauma (Carnage and Damage) (with Aron Stevens) defeated The Miserably Faithful (Sal Vation and Gaagz the Gymp) (with Father James Mitchell) by pinfall / Tag team match; 3 / Max the Impaler (c) (with Father James Mitchell) vs. Mims ended in a time limit draw / Singles match for the NWA World Television Championship; (c) / – the champion(s) heading into the match
149 (S17E6)	"Pretty Buzzed"	January 14, 2024	Tampa, FL	March 12, 2024
Matches: No. / Results / Stipulations; 1 / The Immortals (Kratos and Odinson) (c) vs. Daisy Kill and Talos (with Aron Stevens) ended in a double disqualification / Tag team match for the NWA United States Tag Team Championship; 2 / Missa Kate defeated Taylor Rising by pinfall / Singles match; 3 / Anthony Andrews (with Austin Idol) defeated KC Cazana (with Joe Cazana) by pinfall / Singles match; 4 / Pretty Empowered (Kenzie Paige, Ella Envy, and Kylie Paige) defeated Natalia Markova and The King Bees (Charity King and Danni Bee) by pinfall / Six-woman tag team match Since Pretty Empowered won, Envy and Kylie get an NWA World Women's Tag Team Championship match at Hard Times. Had Markova and The King Bees won, King or Bee would've earned a future NWA World Women's Championship match.; (c) / – the champion(s) heading into the match
150 (S17E7)	"Prison Rules"	January 14, 2024	Tampa, FL	March 19, 2024
Matches: No. / Results / Stipulations; 1 / The Southern 6 (Kerry Morton and Alex Taylor) (with "Thrillbilly" Silas Mason) defeated Bruiser Bob and Devan Dixon by pinfall / Tag team match; 2 / Tiffany Nieves defeated Ruthie Jay by submission / Singles match; 3 / Blake "Bulletproof" Troop (with Chris Silvio, Esq.) defeated Bryan Idol (with Natalia Markova) by technical submission / NWA National Heavyweight Championship qualifying match
151 (S17E8)	"Misery Loves Company"	January 14, 2024	Tampa, FL	March 26, 2024
Matches: No. / Results / Stipulations; 1 / Burchill defeated "Magic" Jake Dumas (with CJ) by pinfall / NWA National Heavyweight Championship qualifying match; 2 / Mecha Wolf defeated Alex Misery by pinfall / Unsanctioned match; 3 / Tim Storm and Jax Dane defeated Magnum Muscle (Mims and Dak Draper) by submission / Tag team match; 4 / AJ Cazana (with Bobby Fulton) defeated Zyon (with Austin Idol) by pinfall / NWA National Heavyweight Championship qualifying match
152 (S17E9)	"Bigs and Smalls"	January 14, 2024	Tampa, FL	April 2, 2024
Matches: No. / Results / Stipulations; 1 / Thom Latimer defeated Carson Drake by submission / NWA National Heavyweight Championship qualifying match; 2 / The Kidz (Alexander Lev and Jackson Drake) defeated The Slimeballz (Sage Chantz and Tommy Rant) by pinfall / Tag team match; 3 / Joe Alonzo defeated Mo Jabari by pinfall / Singles match; 4 / Eric Smalls and Knox and Murdoch defeated The New Spectaculars 2.0 (Spencer Slade, Rush Freeman, and Rolando Freeman) by pinfall / Six-man tag team match

=== Season 18: Crockett Cup 2024 and Back to the Territories ===
No.	Title	Taped date	Location	Original air date
153 (S18E1)	"Hard Times I: Hard Times Aren't Pretty"	March 2, 2024	Dothan, AL	April 9, 2024
Matches: No. / Results / Stipulations; 1 / Joe Alonzo defeated Colby Corino (c) by pinfall / Singles match for the NWA World Junior Heavyweight Championship; 2 / La Rosa Negra and Ruthie Jay defeated Tiffany Nieves and Reka Tehaka by pinfall / Tag team match; 3 / Spencer Slade (with Rolando Freeman) defeated "Magic" Jake Dumas by pinfall / Singles match; 4 / The King Bees (Charity King and Danni Bee) (c) defeated Pretty Empowered (Ella Envy and Kylie Paige) 2–1 / Pretty Rules match for the NWA World Women's Tag Team Championship; (c) / – the champion(s) heading into the match
154 (S18E2)	"Hard Times II: Art of the Heel"	March 2, 2024	Dothan, AL	April 16, 2024
Matches: No. / Results / Stipulations; 1 / The Fixers L.L.C. (Jay Bradley and Wrecking Ball Legursky) defeated Tim Storm and J.A.C. by pinfall / NWA United States Tag Team Championship tournament semifinals match; 2 / Taylor Rising defeated Miss Starr by pinfall / Singles match; 3 / Blunt Force Trauma (Damage and Carnage) (c) (with Aron Stevens) defeated The Immortals (Kratos and Odinson) by pinfall / Tag team match for the NWA World Tag Team Championship; (c) / – the champion(s) heading into the match
155 (S18E3)	"Hard Times III: Devil's Due"	March 2, 2024	Dothan, AL	April 23, 2024
Matches: No. / Results / Stipulations; 1 / Daisy Kill and Talos defeated Alex Misery and Mecha Wolf by pinfall / NWA United States Tag Team Championship tournament semifinals match; 2 / Kenzie Paige (c) defeated Natalia Markova by pinfall / Singles match for the NWA World Women's Championship; 3 / The Miserably Faithful (Max the Impaler, Judais, and Gaagz the Gymp) (with Father James Mitchell) defeated Carson Drake and Magnum Muscle (Dak Draper and Mims) by pinfall / Six-person mixed tag team match; (c) / – the champion(s) heading into the match
156 (S18E4)	"Hard Times IV: Rats in a Cage"	March 2, 2024	Dothan, AL	April 23, 2024
Matches: No. / Results / Stipulations; 1 / The Kidz (Alexander Lev and Jackson Drake) defeated The Slimeballz (Sage Chantz and Tommy Rant) by pinfall / Tag team match; 2 / AJ Cazana (with Joe Cazana and KC Cazana) defeated Anthony Andrews (with Austin Idol and Zyon) by pinfall / Last Call match The winner chooses who will be fired from the loser's side. KC Cazana was handcuffed to the ring post. Cazana won and his father Joe chose Andrews to be fired.; 3 / Knox and Murdoch defeated The Southern 6 (Kerry Morton and Alex Taylor) (with Ricky Morton) by escaping the cage / Steel Cage match
157 (S18E5)	"Hard Times V: Thrill-evator"	March 2, 2024	Dothan, AL	May 7, 2024
Matches: No. / Results / Stipulations; 1 / A. J. Francis defeated Bryan Idol by pinfall / No Disqualification match; 2 / Thom Latimer defeated Blake "Bulletproof" Troop (with Chris Silvio Esq.), Burchill, and Zyon (with Austin Idol) by pinfall / Four-way match for the vacant NWA National Championship; 3 / EC3 (c) defeated "Thrillbilly" Silas Mason by pinfall / Singles match for the NWA Worlds Heavyweight Championship; (c) / – the champion(s) heading into the match
158 (S18E6)	"Crockett Season"	April 12, 2024	Tampa, FL	May 14, 2024
Matches: No. / Results / Stipulations; 1^{D} / The King Bees (Charity King and Danni Bee) defeated Allie Recks and Jessica Roden by pinfall / Tag team match; 2 / The Cheese and Mike Orlando defeated The Heavenly Butterflies (Faboo Andre and Tony Donati) by pinfall / Crockett Cup Play-In match; 3 / The Spectaculars (Brady Pierce and Spencer Slade) (with Rolando Freeman) defeated Kai Price and Cam Fox by pinfall / Crockett Cup Play-In match; 4 / Zyon (with Austin Idol) defeated Mims by submission / Singles match to determine the #1 contender to the NWA National Heavyweight Championship; D / – this was a dark match
159 (S18E7)	"Cup Runneth Over"	April 12, 2024	Tampa, FL	May 21, 2024
Matches: No. / Results / Stipulations; 1^{D} / Eric Smallz (with Mike Knox and Trevor Murdoch) defeated Rolando Freeman (with The Spectaculars (Brady Pierce and Spencer Slade)) by disqualification / Arm Wrestling match; 2 / Tiffany Nieves and Reka Tehaka defeated La Rosa Negra and Ruthie Jay by pinfall / Tag team match; 3 / Joe Alonzo defeated Damian Fenrir by pinfall / Singles match; 4 / Knox and Murdoch defeated The Miserably Faithful (Sal Vation and Gaagz the Gymp) (with Father James Mitchell) by pinfall / Crockett Cup first round match; 5 / The Looks That Kill (Natalia Markova and Bryan Idol) defeated Tim Storm and Jax Dane by disqualification / Crockett Cup first round match; D / – this was a dark match
160 (S18E8)	"Everyone Believes In Magic"	April 12, 2024	Tampa, FL	May 28, 2024
Matches: No. / Results / Stipulations; 1^{D} / Alex Misery vs. Colby Corino ended in a no contest / No Limits match; 2 / Thom Latimer defeated Jake Sterling by pinfall / Singles match; 3 / Daisy Kill and Talos (with Vampiro) defeated The Stew Crew (Dylan Stewart and Zach Stewart) by pinfall / Crockett Cup first round match; 4 / The Southern 6 (Kerry Morton and "Thrillbilly" Silas Mason) defeated The Slimeballz (Sage Cantz and Tommy Rant) by pinfall / Crockett Cup first round match; 5 / Max the Impaler (c) (with Father James Mitchell) defeated "Magic" Jake Dumas by pinfall / Singles match for the NWA World Television Championship; (c) / – the champion(s) heading into the match; D / – this was a dark match
161 (S18E9)	"Gold Fever"	April 12, 2024 and April 13, 2024	Tampa, FL	June 4, 2024
Matches: No. / Results / Stipulations; 1^{D} / The Southern 6 (Kerry Morton, Alex Taylor, and "Thrillbilly" Silas Mason) defeated Joe Alonzo and The Kidz (Alexander Lev and Jackson Drake) by pinfall / Six-man tag team match; 2 / The Country Gentlemen (AJ Cazana and KC Cazana) (with Joe Cazana) defeated The Savages of Samoa (Alofa and Ativalu) by pinfall / Crockett Cup first round match; 3 / The Immortals (Kratos and Odinson) defeated The Kidz (Alexander Lev and Jackson Drake) by pinfall / Crockett Cup first round match; 4 / Ella Envy (with Miss Starr) defeated Kylie Paige and Taylor Rising by pinfall / Three-way match to determine the #1 contender to the NWA World Women's Championship; D / – this was a dark match
162 (S18E10)	"Dallas Bound"	April 13, 2024	Tampa, FL	June 11, 2024
Matches: No. / Results / Stipulations; 1^{D} / Carson Drake defeated "Magic" Jake Dumas by pinfall / Singles match; 2 / Mike Orlando and The Cheese defeated The Spectaculars (Brady Pierce and Spencer Slade) (with Rolando Freeman) by pinfall / Crockett Cup play-in match; 3 / The Warriors from the Wasteland (Max the Impaler and Judais) (with Father James Mitchell) defeated The Fixers, L.L.C. (Jay Bradley and Wrecking Ball Legursky) by pinfall / Crockett Cup first round match; 4 / Blunt Force Trauma (Carnage and Damage) (with Aron Stevens) defeated Mike Orlando and The Cheese by pinfall / Crockett Cup first round match; D / – this was a dark match

=== Season 19: NWA 76 ===
No.	Title	Taped date	Location	Original air date
163 (S19E1)	"Crockett Cup 2024: Part I"	May 18, 2024	Forney, TX	June 18, 2024
Matches: No. / Results / Stipulations; 1 / The Immortals (Kratos and Odinson) defeated Daisy Kill and Talos (with Vampiro) by pinfall / Crockett Cup quarterfinal match; 2 / Tiffany Nieves and Reka Tehaka defeated La Rosa Negra and Ruthie Jay by pinfall / Tag team match to determine the #1 contenders to the NWA World Women's Tag Team Championship; 3 / The Southern Six (Kerry Morton and Alex Taylor) (with Ricky Morton) defeated The Country Gentlemen (AJ Cazana and KC Cazana) (with Joe Cazana) by pinfall / Crockett Cup quarterfinal match
164 (S19E2)	"Crockett Cup 2024: Part II"	May 18, 2024	Forney, TX	June 25, 2024
Matches: No. / Results / Stipulations; 1 / Knox and Murdoch defeated The Looks That Kill (Bryan Idol and Natalia Markova) by pinfall / Crockett Cup quarterfinal match; 2 / Joe Alonzo (c) defeated Jack Cartwheel by pinfall / Singles match for the NWA World Junior Heavyweight Championship; 3 / Blunt Force Trauma (Carnage and Damage) (with Aron Stevens) defeated The Warriors from the Wasteland (Max the Impaler and Judais) (with Father James Mitchell) by pinfall / Crockett Cup quarterfinal match; (c) / – the champion(s) heading into the match
165 (S19E3)	"Crockett Cup 2024: Part III"	May 18, 2024	Forney, TX	July 2, 2024
Matches: No. / Results / Stipulations; 1 / Spencer Slade (with Rolando) defeated Eric Smalls / Grab the Jewels Ladder match The winner gets one free shot to his opponent's family jewels.; 2 / Thom Latimer (c) defeated Zyon (with Austin Idol) by pinfall / Singles match for the NWA National Heavyweight Championship; 3 / The Southern Six (Kerry Morton and Alex Taylor) (with Ricky Morton) defeated Knox and Murdoch by pinfall / Crockett Cup semifinal match; (c) / – the champion(s) heading into the match
166 (S19E4)	"Crockett Cup 2024: Part IV"	May 18, 2024	Forney, TX	July 9, 2024
Matches: No. / Results / Stipulations; 1 / The Immortals (Kratos and Odinson) defeated Blunt Force Trauma (Carnage and Damage) (with Aron Stevens) by pinfall / Crockett Cup semifinal match; 2 / Baron Von Storm (with Jax Dane) defeated Mims (with BLK Jeez) by submission / Singles match; 3 / Kenzie Paige (c) (with Kylie Paige) defeated Ella Envy (with Miss Starr) by pinfall / Singles match for the NWA World Women's Championship; (c) / – the champion(s) heading into the match
165 (S19E5)	"Crockett Cup 2024: Part V"	May 18, 2024	Forney, TX	July 16, 2024
Matches: No. / Results / Stipulations; 1 / The King Bees (Charity King and Danni Bee) (c) defeated Tiffany Nieves and Reka Tehaka by pinfall / Tag team match for the NWA World Women's Tag Team Championship; 2 / EC3 (c) defeated Sam Adonis by pinfall / Singles match for the NWA Worlds Heavyweight Championship; 3 / The Southern Six (Kerry Morton and Alex Taylor) (with Ricky Morton) defeated The Immortals (Kratos and Odinson) by pinfall / Crockett Cup Finals; (c) / – the champion(s) heading into the match
166 (S19E6)	"Came In Like A Wrecking Ball"	April 13, 2024	Tampa, FL	July 23, 2024
Matches: No. / Results / Stipulations; 1 / Blunt Force Trauma (Carnage and Damage) (with Aron Stevens) defeated The Heavenly Butterflies (Faboo Andre and Tony Donati) by pinfall / Tag team match; 2 / Thom Latimer (c) vs. Kerry Morton ended in a time limit draw / Singles match for the NWA National Heavyweight Championship; 3 / Kenzie Paige (c) defeated Missa Kate by pinfall / Singles match for the NWA World Women's Championship; 4 / EC3 (c) defeated Wrecking Ball Legursky (with Drew Garabo) by pinfall / Singles match for the NWA Worlds Heavyweight Championship; (c) / – the champion(s) heading into the match
167 (S19E7)	"Pretty Vacant"	April 13, 2024	Tampa, FL	July 30, 2024
Matches: No. / Results / Stipulations; 1 / Baron Von Storm and Jax Dane vs. The Southern Six (Alex Taylor and "Thrillbilly" Silas Mason) ended in a no contest / Tag team match; 2 / Max the Impaler (c) (with Father James Mitchell) vs. Ella Envy (with Miss Starr) ended in a time limit draw / Singles match for the NWA World Women's Television Championship; 3 / Daisy Kill and Talos (with Vampiro) defeated The Fixers, L.L.C. (Jay Bradley and Wrecking Ball Legursky) by pinfall / Tournament final for the vacant NWA United States Tag Team Championship; (c) / – the champion(s) heading into the match
168 (S19E8)	"Church's Money"	April 13, 2024	Tampa, FL	August 6, 2024
Matches: No. / Results / Stipulations; 1 / The Immortals (Kratos and Odinson) defeated The Dark City Violence Connection (Murder-1 and Joe Black) by pinfall / Tag team match; 2 / Colby Corino defeated Alex Misery by pinfall / Singles match; 3 / The Stew Crew (Dylan Stewart and Zach Stewart) (c) (with Joe Cazana) defeated The Miserably Faithful (Sal Vation and Gaagz the Gymp) by pinfall / Tag team match for the NWA JCP Southeastern Tag Team Championship; 4 / Mims (with BLK Jeez) defeated Zyon (with Austin Idol) by submission / Singles match; (c) / – the champion(s) heading into the match
169 (S19E9)	"The Thrill of the Chase"	April 13, 2024	Tampa, FL	August 13, 2024
Matches: No. / Results / Stipulations; 1 / Knox and Murdoch defeated Champ Matthews and Charles Bison by pinfall / Tag team match; 2 / Thom Latimer (c) defeated "Thrillbilly" Silas Mason by disqualification / Singles match for the NWA National Championship; 3 / The King Bees (Charity King and Danni Bee) defeated La Rosa Negra and Ruthie Jay by pinfall / Tag team match for the NWA World Women's Tag Team Championship; (c) / – the champion(s) heading into the match
170 (S19E10)	"Lightning in a Bottle"	April 13, 2024	Tampa, FL	August 20, 2024
Matches: No. / Results / Stipulations; 1 / Joe Alonzo (c) defeated Rolando, Sodapop Hendrix and Eric Smalls by pinfall / Four-way match for the NWA World Junior Heavyweight Championship; 2 / Jax Dane (with Baron Von Storm) defeated Anthony Catena (with Chris Silvio, Esq.) by pinfall / Singles match; 3 / Baron Von Storm (with Jax Dane) defeated Boz by submission / Singles match; 4 / EC3 (c) defeated KC Cazana (with Joe Cazana) by pinfall / Singles match for the NWA Worlds Heavyweight Championship; (c) / – the champion(s) heading into the match
171 (S19E11)	"Uncharted Territory"	April 13, 2024	Tampa, FL	August 27, 2024
Matches: No. / Results / Stipulations; 1 / The Looks That Kill (Bryan Idol and Natalia Markova) defeated AJ Cazana and Taylor Rising by pinfall / Mixed tag team match; 2 / Carson Drake and The Slimeballz (Sage Chantz and Tommy Rant) defeated "Magic" Jake Dumas and The Kidz (Alexander Lev and Jackson Drake) by pinfall / Six-man tag team match; 3 / Ella Envy (with Miss Starr) defeated Missa Kate by pinfall / Singles match; 4 / Pretty Empowered (Kenzie Paige and Kylie Paige) defeated Reka Tehaka and Tiffany Nieves by pinfall / Tag team match
172 (S19E12)	"Back to the Territories: Part I"	June 1, 2024	Knoxville, TN	September 3, 2024
Matches: No. / Results / Stipulations; 1^{D} / Colby Corino won by last eliminating Slade; Other participants in order of elimination: Tyler Shoop, Wayne Moxxi, Michael Chandler, Jason Hendrix, Rahim de la Suede, Sam Beale, Andy Optimal, Alexander Lev, Dustin Bozworth, Moses the Deliverer, Dillon McQueen, Sebastian, Manbun Jesus, Sal Vation, Anthony Catena, Samuel C, VHS, Gaagz the Gymp, Bruiser Bob, Jackson Drake, "Magic" Jake Dumas, and Daisy Kill / Matt Cardona's Carnyland Gauntlet Battle Royal for an NWA Worlds Heavyweight Championship match later in the night; 2^{D} / Evan Golden defeated Wayne Moxxi by pinfall / Singles match for the NWA Worlds Heavyweight Championship; 3 / Natalia Markova defeated Max the Impaler (with Father James Mitchell) by countout / Singles match; 4 / EC3 (c) defeated Colby Corino by pinfall / Singles match for the NWA Worlds Heavyweight Championship; 5 / Knox and Murdoch (with Eric Smalls) defeated Blunt Force Trauma (Carnage and Damage) (c) (with Aron Stevens) by pinfall / Tag team match for the NWA World Tag Team Championship; (c) / – the champion(s) heading into the match; D / – this was a dark match
173 (S19E13)	"Back to the Territories: Part II"	June 1, 2024	Knoxville, TN	September 10, 2024
Matches: No. / Results / Stipulations; 1 / Jeremiah Plunkett defeated Dante Casanova, Hunter Drake, and Mario Parua by pinfall / Four-way elimination match for the vacant NWA Mid-America Heavyweight Championship; 2 / Carson Drake defeated Bryan Idol by pinfall / Singles match; 3 / Thom Latimer (c) defeated Steve Boz by pinfall / Singles match for the NWA National Heavyweight Championship; 4 / Pretty Empowered (Kenzie Paige and Kylie Paige) defeated The It Girls (Ella Envy and Miss Starr) by pinfall / Street Fight; (c) / – the champion(s) heading into the match
174 (S19E14)	"Back to the Territories: Part III"	June 1, 2024	Knoxville, TN	September 17, 2024
Matches: No. / Results / Stipulations; 1 / Pretty Boy Smooth (c) (with Pastor C-Lo) defeated Mims (with BLK Jeez) by countout / Singles match for the NWA Exodus Pro Midwest Championship; 2 / The King Bees (Charity King and Danni Bee) (c) defeated Caribbean Flow (La Rosa Negra and Ruthie Jay) by pinfall / Tag team match for the NWA World Women's Tag Team Championship; 3 / Juventud Guerrera (c) vs. Zyon (with Austin Idol) ended in a no contest / Singles match for the NWA Kross Fire Championship; 4 / The Stew Crew (Dylan Stewart and Zach Stewart) (c) defeated The Fixers, L.L.C. (Jay Bradley and Wrecking Ball Legursky) by pinfall / Tag team match for the NWA JCP Southeastern Tag Team Championship; (c) / – the champion(s) heading into the match
175 (S19E15)	"Back to the Territories: Part IV"	June 1, 2024	Knoxville, TN	September 24, 2024
Matches: No. / Results / Stipulations; 1 / Joe Alonzo (c) defeated Damian Fenrir, Sodapop Hendrix, Camaro Jackson, Jaden Newman, Tyler Franks, Ashton Day, and Rafael Quintero by pinfall / Eight-way scramble for the NWA World Junior Heavyweight Championship; 2 / Baron Von Storm and Jax Dane defeated The Slimeballz (Sage Chantz and Tommy Rant) by submission / Tag team match to determine the #1 contender to the NWA United States Tag Team Championship; 3 / Tiffany Nieves, Reka Tehaka, and The Southern Six (Kerry Morton, Alex Taylor, and "Thrillbilly" Silas Mason) defeated Burchill, Taylor Rising, Big Mama, and The Country Gentlemen (AJ Cazana and KC Cazana) (with Joe Cazana) by pinfall / Ten-person mixed tag team match; (c) / – the champion(s) heading into the match

=== Season 20: Samhain 2 ===
No.	Title	Taped date	Location	Original air date
176 (S20E1)	"NWA 76: Part I"	August 31, 2024	Philadelphia, PA	October 1, 2024
Matches: No. / Results / Stipulations; 1 / Knox and Murdoch (c) defeated The Southern Six (Kerry Morton and Alex Taylor) by pinfall / Tag team match for the NWA World Tag Team Championship; 2 / Thom Latimer defeated EC3 (c) by pinfall / Singles match for the NWA Worlds Heavyweight Championship; (c) / – the champion(s) heading into the match
177 (S20E2)	"NWA 76: Part II"	August 31, 2024	Philadelphia, PA	October 8, 2024
Matches: No. / Results / Stipulations; 1 / The Immortals (Kratos and Odinson) defeated Blunt Force Trauma (Carnage and Damage) (with Aron Stevens) / Liberty Bell Brawl; 2 / Mims (with BLK Jeez) defeated Bryan Idol, Burchill, and Carson Drake by pinfall / Four-way elimination match for the vacant NWA National Championship; 3 / Kenzie Paige (c) defeated Max the Impaler (with Father James Mitchell) by pinfall / Singles match for the NWA World Women's Championship; (c) / – the champion(s) heading into the match
178 (S20E3)	"NWA 76: Part III"	August 31, 2024	Philadelphia, PA	October 15, 2024
Matches: No. / Results / Stipulations; 1 / Jack Cartwheel defeated Alex Misery by pinfall / Singles match to determine the #1 contender to the NWA World Junior Heavyweight Championship; 2 / Natalia Markova won by last eliminating Tiffany Nieves; Other participants in order of elimination: Ruthie Jay, Big Mama, Lili Ruiz, Kelly Madan, Mystii Marks, Kayla Rossi, "HollyHood" Haley J, Adrianna Mosley, La Rosa Negra, Santana Garrett, and Kylie Paige / Burke Invitational Gauntlet for an NWA World Women's Championship match
179 (S20E4)	"NWA 76: Part IV"	August 31, 2024	Philadelphia, PA	October 22, 2024
Matches: No. / Results / Stipulations; 1 / The Country Gentlemen (AJ Cazana and KC Cazana) (with Joe Cazana) defeated Daisy Kill and Talos (c) (with Vampiro), The Fixers, L.L.C. (Jay Bradley and Wrecking Ball Legursky), and The Slimeballz (Sage Chantz and Tommy Rant) by pinfall / Four-way tag team match for the NWA United States Tag Team Championship; 2 / The It Girls (Ella Envy and Miss Starr) defeated The King Bees (Charity King and Danni Bee) (c) by pinfall / Tag team match for the NWA World Women's Tag Team Championship; (c) / – the champion(s) heading into the match
180 (S20E5)	"NWA 76: Part V"	August 31, 2024	Philadelphia, PA	October 29, 2024
Matches: No. / Results / Stipulations; 1 / Gaagz the Gymp defeated Alexander Lev by pinfall / Singles match; 2 / Zyon and "Magic" Jake Dumas (with Austin Idol) defeated Baron Von Storm and Jax Dane by pinfall / Tag team match; 3 / "Thrillbilly" Silas Mason defeated Colby Corino by pinfall / Singles match
181 (S20E6)	"Bell Time"	October 5, 2024	Tampa, FL	November 5, 2024
Matches: No. / Results / Stipulations; 1 / Carson Drake defeated Bryan Idol by pinfall / Singles match; 2 / Tiffany Nieves and "HollyHood" Haley J defeated Pretty Empowered (Kenzie Paige and Kylie Paige) by pinfall / Tag team match; 3 / Spencer Slade (with Rolando Freeman) defeated Steve Boz by pinfall / Singles match; 4 / Max the Impaler (c) (with Father James Mitchell) defeated Mr. Grim by submission / Singles match for the NWA World Television Championship; 5 / The Immortals (Kratos and Odinson) defeated Blunt Force Trauma (Carnage and Damage) (with Aron Stevens) / Liberty Bell Brawl; (c) / – the champion(s) heading into the match
182 (S20E7)	"Kyle's Gonna Kyle"	October 5, 2024	Tampa, FL	November 12, 2024
Matches: No. / Results / Stipulations; 1^{D} / Daisy Kill and Talos defeated The Miserably Faithful (Judais and Sal Vation) by pinfall / Tag team match; 2 / Max the Impaler (c) (with Father James Mitchell) vs. Carson Drake ended in a time limit draw / Singles match for the NWA World Television Championship; 3 / Jax Dane defeated Zyon by submission / Submission match; 4 / Mims (with BLK Jeez) defeated Sodapop Hendrix by pinfall / Singles match; 5 / Knox and Murdoch (c) defeated Christian Hunter and Jake Powers by pinfall / Tag team match for the NWA World Tag Team Championship; 6 / AJ Cazana (with Joe Cazana) defeated Tommy Rant by pinfall / Singles match; 7 / The Southern Six (Kerry Morton and "Thrillbilly" Silas Mason) defeated Colby Corino and Kyle Davis by pinfall / Tag team match; (c) / – the champion(s) heading into the match; D / – this was a dark match
183 (S20E8)	"Uninvited"	October 5, 2024	Tampa, FL	November 19, 2024
Matches: No. / Results / Stipulations; 1^{D} / Alex Misery and Alexander Lev defeated Joe Ocasio by pinfall / Sacrificial Lamb match Whoever is pinned or submitted will not be a part of an NWA World Junior Heavyweight Championship number one contender's match at Samhain 2. Misery and Lev both pinned Ocasio.; 2 / The It Girls (Ella Envy and Miss Starr) (c) vs. Caribbean Flow (La Rosa Negra and Ruthie Jay) ended in a time limit draw / Tag team match for the NWA World Women's Tag Team Championship; 3 / EC3 defeated Nick Gene by pinfall / Singles match; 4 / The Colóns (Primo Colón and Epico Colón) defeated The Rewind Society (Samuel C and VHS) by pinfall / Tag team match; 5 / Kenzie Paige (c) defeated Natalia Markova by disqaulification / Singles match for the NWA World Women's Championship; 6 / Alex Taylor defeated Christian Anderson by pinfall / Singles match; (c) / – the champion(s) heading into the match; D / – this was a dark match
184 (S20E9)	"A Tale of Slime City"	October 5, 2024	Tampa, FL	November 26, 2024
Matches: No. / Results / Stipulations; 1 / Thom Latimer (c) defeated Race Allen by pinfall / Singles match for the NWA Worlds Heavyweight Championship; 2 / Knox and Murdoch (c) defeated The Fixers, L.L.C. (Jay Bradley and Wrecking Ball Legursky) by pinfall / Tag team match for the NWA World Tag Team Championship; 3 / Baron von Storm vs. "Magic" Jake Dumas ended in a no contest / Submission match; 4 / The Slimeballz (Sage Chantz and Tommy Rant) defeated The Country Gentlemen (Joe Cazana and KC Cazana) (with AJ Cazana) by pinfall / Tag team match; (c) / – the champion(s) heading into the match

=== Season 21: Looks That Kill and Shockwave ===
No.	Title	Taped date	Location	Original air date
185 (S21E1)	"Samhain 2: Part I"	October 26, 2024	Tampa, FL	December 3, 2024
Matches: No. / Results / Stipulations; 1 / The Country Joes (Joe Cazana, AJ Cazana, and KC Cazana) defeated The Slimeballz (Sage Chantz and Tommy Rant) and Jay Bradley by pinfall / By The Book Street Fight; 2 / "HollyHood" Haley J defeated Kylie Paige and Natalia Markova by pinfall / Three-way elimination match to determine the #1 contender to the NWA World Women's Championship; 3 / Daisy Kill and Talos defeated The Immortals (Kratos and Odinson) by pinfall / Tag team match to determine the #1 contender to the NWA World Tag Team Championship
186 (S21E2)	"Samhain 2: Part II"	October 26, 2024	Tampa, FL	December 10, 2024
Matches: No. / Results / Stipulations; 1 / Alex Misery vs. Alexander Lev ended in a no contest / Singles match to determine the #1 contender for the NWA World Junior Heavyweight Championship; 2 / Colby Corino and Bryan Idol defeated The Southern Six (Kerry Morton and "Thrillbilly" Silas Mason) by pinfall / Tag team match; 3 / Carson Drake defeated Max the Impaler (c) (with Father James Mitchell) by pinfall / Hell Awaits match for the NWA World Television Championship; (c) / – the champion(s) heading into the match
187 (S21E3)	"Samhain 2: Part III"	October 26, 2024	Tampa, FL	December 17, 2024
Matches: No. / Results / Stipulations; 1 / The It Girls (Ella Envy and Miss Starr) (c) defeated Caribbean Flow (La Rosa Negra and Ruthie Jay) by pinfall / Tag team match for the NWA World Women's Tag Team Championship; No Time Limit and No Count Outs; 2 / Mims (c) (with BLK Jeez) defeated Burchill by pinfall / Singles match for the NWA National Heavyweight Championship; 3 / Baron Von Storm and Jax Dane defeated Zyon and "Magic" Jake Dumas (with Austin Idol) by pinfall / Tag team match Storm is banned from using the clawhold.; (c) / – the champion(s) heading into the match
188 (S21E4)	"Samhain 2: Part IV"	October 26, 2024	Tampa, FL	December 24, 2024
Matches: No. / Results / Stipulations; 1 / Kenzie Paige (c) defeated Tiffany Nieves by pinfall / Singles match for the NWA World Women's Championship; 2 / The Temple of Duum (Stone Rockwell and The Beastman) defeated The Heavenly Butterflies (Faboo Andre and Tony Donati) by pinfall / Tag team match; 3 / Alex Taylor (c) defeated Jack Cartwheel by pinfall / No Limits match for the NWA World Junior Heavyweight Championship; (c) / – the champion(s) heading into the match
189 (S21E5)	"Samhain 2: Part V"	October 26, 2024	Tampa, FL	December 31, 2024
Matches: No. / Results / Stipulations; 1 / Knox and Murdoch (c) defeated Blunt Force Trauma (Carnage and Damage) (with Aron Stevens) pinfall / Tag team match for the NWA World Tag Team Championship; Eric Smalls was locked by the ringside area in a shark cage.; 2 / Thom Latimer (c) vs. EC3 ended in a no contest / Singles match for the NWA Worlds Heavyweight Championship; (c) / – the champion(s) heading into the match
190 (S21E6)	"Exodus"	October 6, 2024	Tampa, FL	January 7, 2025
Matches: No. / Results / Stipulations; 1^{D} / Hobo Hank defeated Gaagz the Gymp by pinfall / Singles match; 2 / EC3 defeated Josef von Schmidt by pinfall / Singles match; 3 / Ella Envy (with Miss Starr) vs. Shamar Amor and Nima More ended in a no contest / Handicap match; 4 / Knox and Murdoch (c) (with Eric Smalls) defeated The Spectaculars (Rolando and Slade) by pinfall / Tag team match for the NWA World Tag Team Championship; 5 / Mike Mondo defeated Dustin Bozworth by pinfall / Singles match; 6 / The Immortals (Kratos and Odinson) defeated The Colóns (Primo Colón and Epico Colón) by disqualification / Tag team match; (c) / – the champion(s) heading into the match; D / – this was a dark match
191 (S21E7)	"The Fix is In"	October 6, 2024	Tampa, FL	January 14, 2025
Matches: No. / Results / Stipulations; 1 / "Thrillbilly" Silas Mason defeated Mr. Grim by pinfall / Singles match; 2 / Pretty Empowered (Kenzie Paige and Kylie Paige) defeated Caribbean Flow (La Rosa Negra and Ruthie Jay) by pinfall / Tag team match; 3 / Daisy Kill and Talos defeated The Miserably Faithful (Judais and Gaagz the Gymp) by pinfall / Tag team match; 4 / "HollyHood" Haley J defeated Lili "La Pescadita" Ruiz by pinfall / Singles match; 5 / The Slimeballz (Sage Chantz and Tommy Rant) defeated The Fixers (Jay Bradley and Wrecking Ball Legursky) by disqualification / Tag team match
192 (S21E8)	"Dramatic Example"	October 6, 2024	Tampa, FL	January 21, 2025
Matches: No. / Results / Stipulations; 1 / Colby Corino and Joe Ocasio defeated Zyon and "Magic" Jake Dumas by pinfall / Tag team match; 2 / Natalia Markova vs. Tiffany Nieves ended in a double countout / Singles match; 3 / Jax Dane and Baron Von Storm defeated BLK Jeez and Mims by submission / Tag team match; 4 / Kerry Morton defeated Connor "Hazard" Murphy by pinfall / Singles match; 5 / Thom Latimer defeated Tyler Franks by pinfall / Singles match
193 (S21E9)	"At Your Service"	October 6, 2024	Tampa, FL	January 28, 2025
Matches: No. / Results / Stipulations; 1 / Burchill defeated Babathunder by disqualification / Singles match; 2 / Blunt Force Trauma (Carnage and Damage) (with Aron Stevens) defeated Modern Day Outlaws (Nick Gene and Race Allen) by pinfall / Tag team match; 3 / The Country Joes (Joe Cazana, AJ Cazana, and KC Cazana) defeated Christian Anderson and The Rewind Society (Samuel C and VHS) by pinfall / Six-man tornado tag team match; 4 / The Country Joes (Joe Cazana, AJ Cazana, and KC Cazana) defeated Carson Drake and The Slimeballz (Sage Chantz and Tommy Rant) by disqualification / Six-man tornado tag team match; 5 / Alex Taylor defeated Hunter Drake by pinfall / Singles match; 6 / Alex Misery defeated Alexander Lev by pinfall / Singles match Since Lev lost, he must now serve Misery. Had Misery lost, he would have had to serve Lev.

=== Season 22: Hard Times V ===
No.	Title	Taped date	Location	Original air date
194 (S22E1)	"Looks That Kill: Part I"	December 14, 2024	Dothan, AL	February 4, 2025
Matches: No. / Results / Stipulations; 1 / The Colóns (Primo Colón and Epico Colón) defeated Size Matters (Eric Smalls and Sam Stackhouse) by pinfall / Tag team match; 2 / Mims (c) defeated Mr. Grim by pinfall / Singles match for the NWA National Heavyweight Championship; 3 / Kenzie Paige (c) defeated "HollyHood" Haley J by pinfall / Singles match for the NWA World Women's Championship; (c) / – the champion(s) heading into the match
195 (S22E2)	"Looks That Kill: Part II"	December 14, 2024	Dothan, AL	February 11, 2025
Matches: No. / Results / Stipulations; 1 / Knox and Murdoch (c) defeated Daisy Kill and Talos by pinfall / Tag team match for the NWA World Tag Team Championship; 2 / Colby Corino defeated Kerry Morton by pinfall / No Limits match; 3 / Kenzie Paige and Big Mama (with Kylie Paige) defeated The It Girls (Ella Envy and Miss Starr) (c) by pinfall / Tag team match for the NWA World Women's Tag Team Championship; (c) / – the champion(s) heading into the match
196 (S22E3)	"Looks That Kill: Part III"	December 14, 2024	Dothan, AL	February 18, 2025
Matches: No. / Results / Stipulations; 1 / Alex Taylor (c) defeated Joe Ocasio by pinfall / Singles match for the NWA World Junior Heavyweight Championship; 2 / Carson Bartholomew Drake and The Slimeballz (Sage Chantz and Tommy Rant) defeated The Country Joes (Joe Cazana, AJ Cazana, and KC Cazana) by pinfall / Six-man tag team match; 3 / "Thrillbilly" Silas Mason defeated Bryan Idol by technical knockout / Falls Count Anywhere match; (c) / – the champion(s) heading into the match
197 (S22E4)	"Looks That Kill: Part IV"	December 14, 2024	Dothan, AL	February 25, 2025
Matches: No. / Results / Stipulations; 1 / Slade (with Rolando) defeated Alex Misery, Hunter Drake, and Lev by submission / Four-way match to determine the #1 contender to the NWA World Junior Heavyweight Championship; 2 / Mike Mondo defeated Burchill by pinfall / Singles match; 3 / Blunt Force Trauma (Carnage and Damage) (with Aron Stevens) defeated Kratos and Baron Von Storm by pinfall / Tag team match
198 (S22E5)	"Looks That Kill: Part V"	December 14, 2024	Dothan, AL	March 5, 2025
Matches: No. / Results / Stipulations; 1 / Max the Impaler defeated Tyler Franks by pinfall / Singles match; 2 / Natalia Markova defeated Tiffany Nieves by pinfall / Steel Cage match; 3 / Thom Latimer (c) defeated EC3 by pinfall / Steel Cage match for the NWA Worlds Heavyweight Championship; (c) / – the champion(s) heading into the match
199 (S22E6)	"Shockwave: Part I"	January 11, 2024	Forney, TX	March 11, 2025
Matches: No. / Results / Stipulations; 1 / Colby Corino defeated Sam Adonis by pinfall / Singles match Play-In Match to determine the #8 seed in the Dane Memorial Heavyweight Tournament.; 2 / Kenzie Paige and Big Mama (c) defeated CJ and Mystii Marks by pinfall / Tag team match for the NWA World Women's Tag Team Championship; 3 / Kerry Morton defeated Wrecking Ball Legursky by pinfall / Dane Memorial Heavyweight Tournament first round match; (c) / – the champion(s) heading into the match
200 (S22E7)	"Shockwave: Part II"	January 11, 2024	Forney, TX	March 18, 2025
Matches: No. / Results / Stipulations; 1 / Alex Misery vs. Gaagz the Gymp ended in a no contest / Hair vs. Mask match Joe Ocasio was the special guest referee.; 2 / The Money Birds (Gigi Rey and Lady Bird Monroe) defeated Miss Starr and Tiffany Nieves by pinfall / Tag team match; 3 / Frank (with Brandon McCord) defeated Max the Impaler by pinfall / Dane Memorial Heavyweight Tournament first round match
201 (S22E8)	"Shockwave: Part III"	January 11, 2024	Forney, TX	March 25, 2025
Matches: No. / Results / Stipulations; 1 / Carson Bartholomew Drake (c) vs. Alex Misery ended in a time limit draw / Singles match for the NWA World Television Championship; 2 / Burchill defeated Zyon (with Brandon McCord) by submission / Dane Memorial Heavyweight Tournament first round match; 3 / The Immortals (Kratos and Odinson) defeated Daisy Kill and Talos by pinfall / Tag team match; (c) / – the champion(s) heading into the match
202 (S22E9)	"Shockwave: Part IV"	January 11, 2024	Forney, TX	April 1, 2025
Matches: No. / Results / Stipulations; 1 / Alex Taylor (c) defeated Slade by pinfall / Singles match for the NWA World Junior Heavyweight Championship; 2 / Ruthie Jay defeated La Rosa Negra by pinfall / Empty Arena match; 3 / Colby Corino defeated "Thrillbilly" Silas Mason by pinfall / Dane Memorial Heavyweight Tournament first round match; (c) / – the champion(s) heading into the match
203 (S22E10)	"Shockwave: Part V"	January 11, 2024	Forney, TX	April 8, 2025
Matches: No. / Results / Stipulations; 1 / The Country Gentlemen (AJ Cazana and KC Cazana) (with Joe Cazana) defeated Size Matters (Eric Smalls and Sam Stackhouse) by pinfall / Tag team match; 2 / Mims (c) (with BLK Jeez) defeated Mike Mondo by pinfall / Singles match for the NWA National Heavyweight Championship; 3 / Knox defeated The Slimeballz (Sage Chantz and Tommy Rant) by pinfall / 2-on-1 Handicap match; 4 / The Slimeballz (Sage Chantz and Tommy Rant) defeated Knox by pinfall / 2-on-1 Handicap match Since The Slimeballz won, they have earned two opportunities at the NWA World Tag Team Championship; (c) / – the champion(s) heading into the match
204 (S22E11)	"Shockwave: Part VI"	January 11, 2024	Forney, TX	April 15, 2025
Matches: No. / Results / Stipulations; 1 / Natalia Markova (with Bryan Idol) defeated Hunter Drake (with Kylie Paige) by pinfall / Intergender match Had Markova lose, she would never challenge Kenzie Paige for the NWA World Women's Championship.; 2 / Pretty Boy Smooth (c) (with EC3) vs. Baron Von Storm ended in a no contest / Singles match for the NWA Exodus Pro Midwest Championship; 3 / Baron Von Storm and Bam Bam Malone defeated Pretty Boy Smooth and Brandon Barretta (with EC3) by pinfall / Tag team match; 4 / Thom Latimer (c) defeated Carnage (with Aron Stevens) by pinfall / Singles match for the NWA Worlds Heavyweight Championship; (c) / – the champion(s) heading into the match

=== Season 23: Crockett Cup 2025 ===
No.	Title	Taped date	Location	Original air date
205 (S23E1)	"Canvassing"	February 2, 2024	Forney, TX	April 22, 2025
Matches: No. / Results / Stipulations; 1 / Carson Bartholomew Drake (c) defeated Tyler Franks by pinfall / Singles match for the NWA World Television Championship; 2 / Pretty Empowered (Kenzie Paige and Kylie Paige) defeated The Money Birds (Gigi Rey and Lady Bird Monroe) by pinfall / Tag team match; 3 / Frank (with Austin Idol) defeated Kerry Morton by pinfall / Dane Memorial Heavyweight Tournament semifinal match; (c) / – the champion(s) heading into the match
206 (S23E2)	"The Fixers Implode"	February 2, 2024	Forney, TX	April 29, 2025
Matches: No. / Results / Stipulations; 1 / Wrecking Ball Legursky defeated Jay Bradley by pinfall / Singles match; 2 / Colby Corino defeated Zyon (with Austin Idol) by pinfall / Dane Memorial Heavyweight Tournament semifinal match; 3 / EC3 and Pretty Boy Smooth (with Pastor C-Lo) defeated Blunt Force Trauma (Carnage and Damage) (with Aron Stevens) by pinfall / Tag team match
207 (S23E3)	"Tag Teams Go to War"	February 2, 2024	Forney, TX	May 6, 2025
Matches: No. / Results / Stipulations; 1 / The Immortals (Kratos and Odinson) defeated The Colóns (Primo Colón and Epico Colón) by pinfall / Tag team match; 2 / La Rosa Negra defeated Kelsey Heather and Valentina Rossi by pinfall / Three-way match; 3 / Jeremiah Plunkett and Joe Ocasio defeated The Lost (Alex Misery and Gaagz the Gymp) by disqualification / Tag team match; 4 / Bryan Idol defeated Hunter Drake by submission / Singles match
208 (S23E4)	"Title Tuesday"	February 2, 2024	Forney, TX	May 13, 2025
Matches: No. / Results / Stipulations; 1 / Kenzie Paige (c) defeated Amber Nova and Carolina Cruz by pinfall / Three-way match for the NWA World Women's Championship; 2 / Knox and Murdoch (Mike Knox and Trevor Murdoch) (c) defeated The Slimeballz (Sage Chantz and Tommy Rant) by pinfall / Tag team match for the NWA World Tag Team Championship; 3 / The Slimeballz (Sage Chantz and Tommy Rant) defeated Knox and Murdoch (Mike Knox and Trevor Murdoch) (c) by disqualification / Tag team match for the NWA World Tag Team Championship; 4 / Steve Boz defeated Nic Swift by pinfall / Singles match; 5 / Tiffany Nieves defeated Big Mama (c) by submission / Singles match for the NWA World Women's Television Championship; (c) / – the champion(s) heading into the match
209 (S23E5)	"Preview"	February 2, 2024	Forney, TX	May 20, 2025
Matches: No. / Results / Stipulations; 1 / Daisy Kill and Talos defeated Damian Fenrir and Dante Casanova by pinfall / Tag team match; 2 / Carson Drake (c) vs. Baron Von Storm vs. Pretty Boy Smooth (with EC3 and Pastor C-Lo) ended in a time limit draw / Three-way match for the NWA World Television Championship; 3 / Mike Mondo and Slade (with Rolando) defeated BLK Jeez and Mims by pinfall / Tag team match; (c) / – the champion(s) heading into the match
210 (S23E6)	"Mint Julep"	February 2, 2024	Forney, TX	May 27, 2025
Matches: No. / Results / Stipulations; 1 / The Southern Six (Alex Taylor and "Thrillbilly" Silas Mason) defeated The Country Gentlemen (AJ Cazana and KC Cazana) (with Joe Cazana) by pinfall / Blood N' Grits Street Fight; 2 / Thom Latimer (c) defeated Aron Stevens by submission / Mint Julip match for the NWA Worlds Heavyweight Championship; (c) / – the champion(s) heading into the match
211 (S23E7)	"Hard Times V: Part I"	March 22, 2025	Dothan, AL	June 3, 2025
Matches: No. / Results / Stipulations; 1 / The Colóns (Primo Colón and Epico Colón) defeated Daisy Kill and Talos, The Immortals (Kratos and Odinson), and Blunt Force Trauma (Carnage and Damage) by pinfall / Four-way tag team elimination match to determine the #2 seed in the Crockett Cup; 2 / Crazzy Steve defeated Damien Fenrir by submission / Singles match; 3 / Mims (c) (with BLK Jeez) defeated Wrecking Ball Legursky by pinfall / Singles match for the NWA National Heavyweight Championship; (c) / – the champion(s) heading into the match
212 (S23E8)	"Hard Times V: Part II"	March 22, 2025	Dothan, AL	June 10, 2025
Matches: No. / Results / Stipulations; 1 / EC3 and Pretty Boy Smooth (with Pastor C-Lo) defeated Burchill and Joe Ocasio by pinfall / Tag team match; 2 / Slade defeated Hunter Drake by submission / Singles match; 3 / Colby Corino defeated Frank (with Austin Idol) by pinfall / Dane Memorial Heavyweight Tournament final match to determine the #1 contender to the NWA Worlds Heavyweight Championship
213 (S23E9)	"Hard Times V: Part III"	March 22, 2025	Dothan, AL	June 17, 2025
Matches: No. / Results / Stipulations; 1 / The Lost (Alex Misery, Lev, and Gaagz the Gymp) defeated Size Matters (Eric Smalls and Sam Stackhouse) and Tyler Franks by pinfall / Six-man tag team match; 2 / Jay Bradley defeated Slex by pinfall / Singles match; 3 / The Temple of Duum (Stone Rockwell and The Beastman) defeated Baron Von Storm and Brandon Barretta by pinfall / Tag team match
214 (S23E10)	"Hard Times V: Part IV"	March 22, 2025	Dothan, AL	June 24, 2025
Matches: No. / Results / Stipulations; 1 / TV-MA (Tiffany Nieves and Valentina Rossi) (with Miss Starr) defeated Kenzie Paige and Big Mama (c) by pinfall / Tag team match for the NWA World Women's Tag Team Championship; 2 / Mike Mondo defeated Zyon (with Austin Idol) by pinfall / Singles match; 3 / The Southern Six (Kerry Morton and Alex Taylor) defeated The Country Gentlemen (AJ Cazana and KC Cazana) (c) (with Joe Cazana) by pinfall / Tag team match for the NWA United States Tag Team Championship; (c) / – the champion(s) heading into the match
215 (S23E11)	"Hard Times V: Part V"	March 22, 2025	Dothan, AL	July 1, 2025
Matches: No. / Results / Stipulations; 1 / "Thrillbilly" Silas Mason defeated Bryan Idol by pinfall / No Limits match; 2 / Natalia Markova defeated Kylie Paige by pinfall / Singles match to determine the #1 contender to the NWA World Women's Championship at NWA 77th Anniversary Show
216 (S23E12)	"Hard Times V: Part VI"	March 22, 2025	Dothan, AL	July 8, 2025
Matches: No. / Results / Stipulations; 1 / Knox and Murdoch (c) defeated The Slimeballz (Sage Chantz and Tommy Rant) / Ladder match for the NWA World Tag Team Championship; 2 / Thom Latimer (c) defeated Carson Bartholomew Drake by pinfall / Singles match for the NWA Worlds Heavyweight Championship; (c) / – the champion(s) heading into the match

=== Season 24: NWA 77 ===
No.	Title	Taped date	Location	Original air date
217 (S24E1)	"It's Me"	May 17, 2025	Philadelphia, PA	July 29, 2025
Matches: No. / Results / Stipulations; 1 / The Slimeballz (Sage Chantz and Tommy Rant) won by last eliminating The JV Squad (Dalton McKenzie and Jack Vaughn); Teams in order of elimination: Temple of Duum (Beastman and Stone Rockwell), Adrianna Mosley and Tim Theory, Shawn Carlson and Ty Awesome, South Philly's Finest (Jimmy Konway and Luca Brazzi), Foxx Vinyer and Joe Ocasio, Size Matters (Eric Smalls and Sam Stackhouse), and Moses and Mr. Grim / David Crockett Invitational Tag Team Battle Royal to determine the #12 seed in the Crockett Cup; 2 / The Slimeballz (Sage Chantz and Tommy Rant) defeated Blunt Force Trauma (Carnage and Damage) (with Aron Stevens) by pinfall / Crockett Cup first round match; 3 / The Holy Grail (EC3 and Pretty Boy Smooth) (with Pastor C-Lo) defeated The Lost (Alex Misery and Crazzy Steve) (with Father James Mitchell, Gaagz the Gymp, and Lev) by pinfall / Crockett Cup first round match; 4 / Bryan Idol defeated Carson Bartholomew Drake by pinfall / Singles match for the vacant NWA World Television Championship
218 (S24E2)	"Hell Hath No Fury"	May 17, 2025	Philadelphia, PA	August 5, 2025
Matches: No. / Results / Stipulations; 1 / Daisy Kill and Talos defeated The Nightmare Syndicate (Zyon and Frank) (with Austin Idol) by pinfall / Crockett Cup first round match; 2 / Mike Mondo and Slade (with Rolando) defeated The Country Gentlemen (AJ Cazana and KC Cazana) (with Joe Cazana) by submission / Crockett Cup first round match; 3 / Natalia Markova defeated Kylie Paige by pinfall / No Limits match
219 (S24E3)	"Return Trip"	May 17, 2025	Philadelphia, PA	August 12, 2025
Matches: No. / Results / Stipulations; 1 / TV-MA (Tiffany Nieves and Valentina Rossi) (c) (with Miss Starr) defeated The Island Twins (Ta'ahine Tonga and Tala-vou Tonga) by pinfall / Tag team match for the NWA World Women's Tag Team Championship; 2 / The Immortals (Kratos and Odinson) defeated The Slimeballz (Sage Chantz and Tommy Rant) by pinfall / Crockett Cup quarterfinal match; 3 / The Holy Grail (EC3 and Pretty Boy Smooth) (with Pastor C-Lo) defeated The Southern Six (Kerry Morton and Alex Taylor) by pinfall / Crockett Cup quarterfinal match; (c) / – the champion(s) heading into the match
220 (S24E4)	"Cup. Crown. Repeat?"	May 17, 2025	Philadelphia, PA	August 19, 2025
Matches: No. / Results / Stipulations; 1 / Wrecking Ball Legursky defeated Jay Bradley by pinfall / Chain match; 2 / The Colóns (Primo Colón and Epico Colón) defeated Daisy Kill and Talos by pinfall / Crockett Cup quarterfinal match; 3 / Knox and Murdoch (with Eric Smalls) defeated Mike Mondo and Slade (with Rolando) by pinfall / Crockett Cup quarterfinal match
221 (S24E5)	"On The Verge"	May 17, 2025	Philadelphia, PA	August 26, 2025
Matches: No. / Results / Stipulations; 1 / Mims (c) (with BLK Jeez) defeated Max the Impaler by pinfall / Singles match for the NWA National Heavyweight Championship; 2 / "Thrillbilly" Silas Mason defeated Alex Hammerstone by pinfall / Singles match; (c) / – the champion(s) heading into the match
222 (S24E6)	"No Turning Back"	May 17, 2025	Philadelphia, PA	September 2, 2025
Matches: No. / Results / Stipulations; 1 / The Colóns (Primo Colón and Epico Colón) defeated The Holy Grail (EC3 and Pretty Boy Smooth) (with Pastor C-Lo) by pinfall / Crockett Cup semifinal match; 2 / The Immortals (Kratos and Odinson) defeated Knox and Murdoch (with Eric Smalls) by pinfall / Crockett Cup semifinal match
223 (S24E7)	"2025 Crockett Cup Finals"	May 17, 2025	Philadelphia, PA	September 9, 2025
Matches: No. / Results / Stipulations; 1^{D} / Kenzie Paige (c) defeated Nattie Neidhart by pinfall / Singles match for the NWA World Women's Championship; 2 / Thom Latimer (c) defeated Rhino and Colby Corino by pinfall / Three-way match for the NWA Worlds Heavyweight Championship; 3 / The Immortals (Kratos and Odinson) defeated The Colóns (Primo Colón and Epico Colón) by pinfall / Crockett Cup final; (c) / – the champion(s) heading into the match; D / – this was a dark match
224 (S24E8)	"Return of The Righteous"	July 1, 2025	Tampa, FL	September 16, 2025
Matches: No. / Results / Stipulations; 1^{D} / Devastation Reborn (AJ Farat, Frank Stone, and Marovik) defeated The Foundation (Jaden Newman, Jameson Shook, and Tyler Stevens) by pinfall / Six-man tag team match; 2 / Kylie Paige defeated Gabby Forza by pinfall / Singles match; 3 / Carson Bartholomew Drake defeated Midas Black by submission / Singles match; 4 / TV-MA (Tiffany Nieves and Valentina Rossi) (c) (with Miss Starr) defeated Clara Carter and Sirena Veil by submission / Tag team match for the NWA World Women's Tag Team Championship; 5 / "Thrillbilly" Silas Mason defeated Cristiano Argento by pinfall / Singles match; (c) / – the champion(s) heading into the match; D / – this was a dark match
225 (S24E9)	"Good Time"	July 1, 2025	Tampa, FL	September 23, 2025
Matches: No. / Results / Stipulations; 1^{D} / Lev defeated Izzy James, Pop-Noir, RJ Kent, and Shayne Stetson by pinfall / Five-way scramble; 2 / The Holy Grail (EC3 and Pretty Boy Smooth) defeated Cam Fox and Kai Price by pinfall / Tag team match; 3 / Alex Taylor (c) defeated Luke Kurtis by pinfall / Singles match for the NWA World Junior Heavyweight Championship; 4 / The Country Gentlemen (AJ Cazana and KC Cazana) (with Joe Cazana) defeated The Rewind Society (Samuel C and VHS) by pinfall / Tag team match; 5 / Bryan Idol (c) defeated Daisy Kill by pinfall / Singles match for the NWA World Television Championship; (c) / – the champion(s) heading into the match; D / – this was a dark match
226 (S24E10)	"Twice Bitten"	July 1, 2025	Tampa, FL	September 30, 2025
Matches: No. / Results / Stipulations; 1 / Knox and Murdoch defeated The Cloud 9 Cowboys (Ty Awesome and Shawn Carlson) (with Eric Smalls) by pinfall / Tag team match; 2 / Rich Swann defeated Alex Misery (with Father James Mitchell and Lev) by pinfall / Singles match to determine the #1 contender to the NWA World Junior Heavyweight Championship; 3 / Tiffany Nieves (c) (with Miss Starr) defeated Aleah James by submission / Singles match for the NWA World Women's Television Championship; 4 / The Pope defeated Mims by pinfall / Singles match; (c) / – the champion(s) heading into the match
227 (S24E11)	"Hold The Line"	July 1, 2025	Tampa, FL	October 7, 2025
Matches: No. / Results / Stipulations; 1^{D} / Zyon (with Austin Idol) defeated Tyler Franks / Singles match; 2 / Natalia Markova defeated Kelsey Heather by pinfall / Singles match; 3 / Colby Corino defeated JAC by pinfall / Singles match; 4 / Kenzie Paige (c) defeated Karissa Rivera by pinfall / Singles match for the NWA World Women's Championship; 5 / Hunter Drake and Tommy Henry vs. The Country Gentlemen (AJ Cazana and KC Cazana) (with Joe Cazana) ended in a no contest / Tag team match; (c) / – the champion(s) heading into the match; D / – this was a dark match
228 (S24E12)	"Entra El Dragón"	July 1, 2025	Tampa, FL	October 14, 2025
Matches: No. / Results / Stipulations; 1^{D} / The Southern Six (Kerry Morton and Alex Taylor) defeated Casey King and Jeff Paul by pinfall / Tag team match; 2 / Mike Mondo and Spencer Slade (with Aron Stevens) defeated The Lost (Lev and Alex Misery) (with Father James Mitchell) by pinfall / Tag team match; 3 / Kerry Morton defeated Dillon McQueen by pinfall / Singles match; 4 / Trevor Murdoch (with Mike Knox) defeated Eric Smalls by pinfall / "Handcuffed Heat" match Knox was zip-tied to the bottom rope.; 5 / Damian Fenrir defeated Nic Swift by pinfall / Singles match; 6 / Thom Latimer (c) defeated El Dragón Nihan by pinfall / Singles match for the NWA Worlds Heavyweight Championship; (c) / – the champion(s) heading into the match; D / – this was a dark match

=== Season 25: Samhain: Part 3 ===
No.	Title	Taped date	Location	Original air date
229 (S25E1)	"New York Minute"	August 16, 2025	Huntington, NY	October 21, 2025
Matches: No. / Results / Stipulations; 1 / Alex Taylor (c) defeated Rich Swann by pinfall / Singles match for the NWA World Junior Heavyweight Championship; 2 / The Colóns (Primo Colón and Epico Colón) defeated Blunt Force Trauma (Carnage and Damage) (with Aron Stevens), Nightmare Syn (Frank and Zyon) (with Austin Idol), and The Slimeballz (Sage Chantz and Tommy Rant) by pinfall / Four-way tag team elimination match to determine the #1 contenders to the NWA World Tag Team Championship; 3 / Bryan Idol (c) defeated Joe Ocasio by pinfall / Singles match for the NWA World Television Championship; (c) / – the champion(s) heading into the match
230 (S25E2)	"Bad Company"	August 16, 2025	Huntington, NY	October 28, 2025
Matches: No. / Results / Stipulations; 1^{D} / Lockjaw Drake defeated Dreadknot by pinfall / Singles match This match was taped on July 1, 2025 in Tampa, Florida.; 2 / Damian Fenrir defeated Luke Kurtis, Spencer Slade, and The Lost (Alex Misery, Crazzy Steve, and Lev) (with Gaagz the Gymp and Father James Mitchell) by pinfall / "King Bee" match to determine the #1 contender to the NWA World Junior Heavyweight Championship: Stage 1: Six-man tag team match (Fenrir, Kurtis, and Slade defeated The Lost); Stage 2: Three-way match (Fenrir pinned Kurtis to win); 3 / Hammerstone defeated Kerry Morton by pinfall / Singles match; 4 / Aron Stevens and Carson Bartholomew Drake defeated The Holy Grail (EC3 and Pretty Boy Smooth) (with Pastor C-Lo) by pinfall / Tag team match; D / – this was a dark match
231 (S25E3)	"Gut Check Time"	August 16, 2025	Huntington, NY	November 4, 2025
Matches: No. / Results / Stipulations; 1 / Tiffany Nieves (c) (with Miss Starr) defeated Sirena Veil by submission / Singles match for the NWA World Women's Television Championship; 2 / Tyler Stevens won by last eliminating Lockjaw Drake; The other participants in order of elimination: Izzy James, Jeremiah Plunkett, Camaro Jackson, Mario Pardua, Cristiano Argento, Jay Bradley, Frank Stone, Charlie Adams, Wrecking Ball Legursky, and Dante Casanova / Austin Idol's Heartthrob Invitational Gauntlet to determine the #1 contender to the NWA National Heavyweight Championship; 3 / Mike Mondo (with Aron Stevens) defeated Mims (c) (with BLK Jeez) by pinfall / Singles match for the NWA National Heavyweight Championship; (c) / – the champion(s) heading into the match
232 (S25E4)	"Beautiful Disaster"	August 16, 2025	Huntington, NY	November 11, 2025
Matches: No. / Results / Stipulations; 1^{D} / Pretty Boy Smooth defeated Blake "Bulletproof" Troop by pinfall / Singles match This match was taped on July 1, 2025 in Tampa, Florida.; 2 / Baron Von Storm defeated Daisy Kill (with Talos) by disqualification / No count-out match; 3 / Team NWA JCP (Bullwhip Ballard, Judy Lee Taylor, and The Country Gentlemen (AJ Cazana and KC Cazana)) (with Joe Cazana) defeated Team NWA Kross Fire (Tommy Henry, Kylie Paige, Hunter Drake, and Tyler Franks) by pinfall / No Limits eight-person tag team match; 4 / Natalia Markova defeated Kenzie Paige (c) by pinfall / Singles match for the NWA World Women's Championship; (c) / – the champion(s) heading into the match; D / – this was a dark match
233 (S25E5)	"To The Top"	August 16, 2025	Huntington, NY	November 18, 2025
Matches: No. / Results / Stipulations; 1 / El Dragón Nihan defeated Max the Impaler by pinfall / Falls Count Anywhere Street Fight; 2 / The Immortals (Kratos and Odinson) defeated Knox and Murdoch (c) by pinfall / Tag team match for the NWA World Tag Team Championship; 3 / "Thrillbilly" Silas Mason defeated Thom Latimer (c) by pinfall / Singles match for the NWA World's Heavyweight Championship; (c) / – the champion(s) heading into the match
234 (S25E6)	"Hostile Takeover"	September 5, 2025	Tampa, FL	November 25, 2025
Matches: No. / Results / Stipulations; 1^{D} / Valentina Rossi (with Miss Starr) defeated Scotti Sosa by pinfall / Singles match This match was taped on July 1, 2025.; 2 / Alex Taylor (c) defeated Damian Fenrir by pinfall / Singles match for the NWA World Junior Heavyweight Championship; 3 / Nightmare Syn (Zyon and Frank) (with Austin Idol) defeated Tyler Franks and Cristiano Argento by pinfall / Tag team match; 4 / Bryan Idol (c) defeated Slade (with Aron Stevens) by disqualification / Singles match for the NWA World Television Championship; 5 / The Immortals (Kratos and Odinson) (c) defeated The Colóns (Primo Colón and Epico Colón) by pinfall / Tag team match for the NWA World Tag Team Championship; (c) / – the champion(s) heading into the match; D / – this was a dark match
235 (S25E7)	"By The Book"	September 5, 2025	Tampa, FL	December 2, 2025
Matches: No. / Results / Stipulations; 1 / Tiffany Nieves and Gretta (with Miss Starr) defeated Pretty Empowered (Kenzie Paige and Kylie Paige) by disqualification / Tag team match for the vacant NWA World Women's Tag Team Championship; 2 / Mike Mondo (c) (with Aron Stevens defeated Tyler Stevens by pinfall / Singles match for the NWA National Heavyweight Championship; 3 / The Lost (Alex Misery and Lev) defeated Duke Hanson and Slex by pinfall / Tag team match; 4 / "Thrillbilly" Silas Mason (c) defeated JAC by pinfall / Singles match for the NWA Worlds Heavyweight Championship; (c) / – the champion(s) heading into the match
236 (S25E8)	"Homeward Bound"	September 5, 2025	Tampa, FL	December 9, 2025
Matches: No. / Results / Stipulations; 1 / The Drakes (Carson Bartholomew Drake and Lockjaw Drake) (with Aron Stevens) defeated The Rewind Society (Samuel C and VHS) by technical submission / Tag team match; 2 / Hunter Drake defeated KC Cazana by pinfall / No Limits match; 3 / Natalia Markova (c) defeated Sirena Veil by pinfall / Singles match for the NWA World Women's Championship; (c) / – the champion(s) heading into the match
236 (S25E9)	"Get In The Ring"	September 5, 2025	Tampa, FL	December 16, 2025
Matches: No. / Results / Stipulations; 1 / The Slimeballz (Sage Chantz and Tommy Rant) (with Aron Stevens) defeated Kerry Morton (c) by pinfall / Handicap match for the NWA United States Tag Team Championship; 2 / AJ Cazana (with Joe Cazana) defeated Tommy Henry by technical submission / No Limits match; 3 / Thom Latimer defeated Trevor Murdoch (with Mike Knox) by pinfall / Singles match to determine the number one contender to the NWA Worlds Heavyweight Championship; Eric Smalls was the special guest referee; (c) / – the champion(s) heading into the match
238 (S25E10)	"Stronger"	September 5, 2025	Tampa, FL	December 23, 2025
Matches: No. / Results / Stipulations; 1^{D} / Lev defeated Duke Hanson by pinfall / Singles match; 2 / Alex Misery defeated Daisy Kill and Joe Bravo by pinfall / Three-way match; 3 / The Holy Grail (EC3 and Pretty Boy Smooth) defeated The Drakes (Carson Bartholomew Drake and Lockjaw Drake) (with Aron Stevens) by pinfall / Tag team match; 4 / Tiffany Nieves (c) (with Miss Starr and Gretta) defeated Clara Carter by submission / Singles match for the NWA World Women's Television Championship; 5 / Mims defeated The Pope by pinfall / Singles match; (c) / – the champion(s) heading into the match; D / – this was a dark match

=== Season 26: Crockett Cup 2026 and Hard Times 6 ===
No.	Title	Taped date	Location	Original air date
239 (S26E1)	"Alwayz Ready"	October 17, 2025	Atlanta, GA	December 30, 2025
Matches: No. / Results / Stipulations; 1 / "HollyHood" Haley J defeated Sirena Veil by pinfall / Singles match; 2 / The Good Brothers (Doc Gallows and Karl Anderson) defeated The Hard Way (Jack Vaughn and Dalton McKenzie) by pinfall / Tag team match; 3 / Nightmare Syn (Zyon and Frank) (with Austin Idol) defeated Hunter Drake and Tyler Franks by pinfall / Empty Arena tag team match; 4 / Matt Cardona defeated Daisy Kill by pinfall / Singles match
240 (S26E2)	"Final Nail in the Coffin"	October 17, 2025	Atlanta, GA	January 6, 2026
Matches: No. / Results / Stipulations; 1 / Kerry Morton defeated Damian Fenrir by pinfall / Singles match; 2 / El Dragón Nihan defeated Mims by pinfall / Singles match; 3 / The Lost (Alex Misery, Gaagz the Gymp, and Lev) (with Father James Mitchell) defeated Aron Stevens, Carson Bartholomew Drake, and Lockjaw Drake / Six-man tag team Casket match; 4 / Mike Mondo (c) defeated Wrecking Ball Legursky by pinfall / Singles match for the NWA National Heavyweight Championship; (c) / – the champion(s) heading into the match
241 (S26E3)	"Enemy Territory"	October 17, 2025	Atlanta, GA	January 13, 2026
Matches: No. / Results / Stipulations; 1^{D} / Izzy James defeated Midas Black by pinfall / Singles match This match was taped on September 5, 2025 in Tampa, Florida.; 2 / The Slimeballz (Sage Chantz and Tommy Rant) (c) (with Aron Stevens) defeated The Holy Grail (Pretty Boy Smooth and Cristiano Argento) (with EC3 and Pastor C-Lo) by pinfall / Tag team match for the NWA United States Tag Team Championship; 3 / Hammerstone defeated Trevor Murdoch (with Mike Knox) by pinfall / Singles match; 4 / The Country Gentlemen (AJ Cazana and KC Cazana) (with Joe Cazana) defeated Pretty Empowered (Kenzie Paige and Kylie Paige) (with Tommy Henry) by pinfall / No Limits intergender tag team match; (c) / – the champion(s) heading into the match; D / – this was a dark match
242 (S26E4)	"Witching Hour"	October 17, 2025	Atlanta, GA	January 20, 2026
Matches: No. / Results / Stipulations; 1 / Spencer Slade (with Aron Stevens) defeated Alex Taylor (c) by submission / Singles match for the NWA World Junior Heavyweight Championship; 2 / TV-MA (Tiffany Nieves and Valentina Rossi) (with Miss Starr) defeated The Hex (Allysin Kay and Marti Belle) by pinfall / Tag team match for the vacant NWA World Women's Tag Team Championship; 3 / Bryan Idol (c) defeated Rich Swann by pinfall / Singles match for the NWA World Television Championship; (c) / – the champion(s) heading into the match
243 (S26E5)	"A Man of His Word"	October 17, 2025	Atlanta, GA	January 27, 2026
Matches: No. / Results / Stipulations; 1^{D} / Audrey Allen and Rachel Ley defeated Skyler Sparks and Vipress by pinfall / Tag team match This match was taped on December 13, 2025 in Tampa, Florida.; 2 / The Immortals (Kratos and Odinson) (c) defeated Blunt Force Trauma (Carnage and Damage) by pinfall / Tag team match for the NWA World Tag Team Championship; 3 / Natalia Markova (c) defeated Shotzi Blackheart by pinfall / Singles match for the NWA World Women's Championship; 4 / "Thrillbilly" Silas Mason (c) defeated Matt Cardona by technical submission / Peachtree Street Fight for the NWA Worlds Heavyweight Championship; (c) / – the champion(s) heading into the match; D / – this was a dark match
244 (S26E6)	"The Hard Way"	December 13, 2025	Tampa, FL	February 3, 2026
Matches: No. / Results / Stipulations; 1 / Mims defeated El Dragón Nihan by pinfall / Singles match; 2 / Sirena Veil and Vipress defeated "HollyHood" Haley J and Rachel Ley by pinfall / Tag team match; 3 / Pretty Boy Smooth (with EC3 and Pastor C-Lo) defeated Cristiano Argento by pinfall / Singles match; 4 / Teal Piper and Herra defeated Pretty Empowered (Kenzie Paige and Kylie Paige) by submission / Tag team match; 5 / The Immortals (Kratos and Odinson) (c) defeated The Hard Way (Jack Vaughn and Dalton McKenzie) by pinfall / Tag team match for the NWA World Tag Team Championship; (c) / – the champion(s) heading into the match
245 (S26E7)	"Slime Time"	December 13, 2025	Tampa, FL	February 10, 2026
Matches: No. / Results / Stipulations; 1 / Bryan Idol (c) defeated Carnage by pinfall / Singles match for the NWA World Television Championship; 2 / The Hex (Allysin Kay and Marti Belle) defeated TV-MA (Tiffany Nieves and Valentina Rossi) (with Miss Starr and Gretta) by pinfall / Tag team match for the NWA World Women's Tag Team Championship; 3 / Carson Bartholomew Drake defeated Alex Misery by technical submission / No Limits match; 4 / Natalia Markova (c) defeated Gisele Shaw by pinfall / Singles match for the NWA World Women's Championship; 5 / The Slimeballz (Sage Chantz and Tommy Rant) (c) defeated The Country Gentlemen (AJ Cazana and KC Cazana) (with Joe Cazana) by pinfall / Tag team match for the NWA United States Tag Team Championship; (c) / – the champion(s) heading into the match
246 (S26E8)	"Run It Back"	December 13, 2025	Tampa, FL	February 17, 2026
Matches: No. / Results / Stipulations; 1 / Damian Fenrir defeated Alex Taylor by pinfall / Singles match; 2 / Kerry Morton defeated Daisy Kill by pinfall / Singles match This was part of the Daisy Kill "Reign of Terror" open challenge; 3 / The Wrestling Machines (Mike Mondo and Spencer Slade) (with Aron Stevens) defeated Wrecking Ball Legursky and JAC by pinfall / Tag team match; 4 / Trevor Murdoch defeated Tyler Stevens by pinfall / Singles match; 5 / "Thrillbilly" Silas Mason (c) defeated Thom Latimer by pinfall / Singles match for the NWA Worlds Heavyweight Championship; (c) / – the champion(s) heading into the match
247 (S26E9)	"The Devil You Know"	December 13, 2025	Tampa, FL	February 24, 2026
Matches: No. / Results / Stipulations; 1 / Natalia Markova and Gisele Shaw defeated Tiffany Nieves and Gretta (with Miss Starr) by pinfall / Tag team match; 2 / Slade defeated Damian Fenrir by submission / Singles match; 3 / The Slimeballz (Sage Chantz and Tommy Rant) (c) defeated Jack Valor and Eddie Grayson by pinfall / Tag team match for the NWA United States Tag Team Championship; 4 / Kenzie Paige defeated Teal Piper by pinfall / Singles match; 5 / El Dragón Nihan and Wrecking Ball Legursky defeated Da Pope and Mims by pinfall / Tag team match; (c) / – the champion(s) heading into the match
248 (S26E10)	"Odd Man Out"	December 13, 2025	Tampa, FL	March 3, 2026
Matches: No. / Results / Stipulations; 1 / Trevor Murdoch (with Mike Knox) defeated Pretty Boy Smooth (with EC3 and Pastor C-Lo) by pinfall / Singles match; 2 / Herra defeated Kylie Paige by disqualification / Submission match; 3 / Alex Taylor defeated Bryce Hansen, JAC, and Tyler Franks by pinfall / Four-way elimination match; 4 / Alex Misery defeated Aron Stevens by countout / Singles match; 5 / The Country Gentlemen (AJ Cazana and KC Cazana) (with Joe Cazana) defeated The Immortals (Kratos and Odinson) (c) by disqualification / Tag team match for the NWA World Tag Team Championship; (c) / – the champion(s) heading into the match
249 (S26E11)	"The Doctor Is In"	December 13, 2025	Tampa, FL	March 10, 2026
Matches: No. / Results / Stipulations; 1 / The Hex (Allysin Kay and Marti Belle) (c) defeated Sirena Veil and Vipress by pinfall / Tag team match for the NWA World Women's Tag Team Championship; 2 / Mike Mondo (c) (with Aron Stevens) defeated Blake "Bulletproof" Troop by pinfall / Singles match for the NWA National Heavyweight Championship; 3 / Carson Drake and The Hard Way (Jack Vaughn and Dalton McKenzie) (with Aron Stevens) defeated Dr. Vik and Devastation Reborn (AJ Farat and Frank Stone) by submission / Six-man tag team match; 4 / Daisy Kill defeated Hunter Drake by pinfall / Singles match This was part of the Daisy Kill "Reign of Terror" open challenge; 5 / Daisy Kill defeated Lev (with Gaagz the Gymp) by disqualification / Singles match This was part of the Daisy Kill "Reign of Terror" open challenge; 6 / Eric Smalls defeated Daisy Kill by pinfall / Singles match This was part of the Daisy Kill "Reign of Terror" open challenge; 7 / Thom Latimer and Bryan Idol defeated The Southern Six ("Thrillbilly" Silas Mason and Kerry Morton) by pinfall / Tag team match The winning team earned the right to choose the stipulation for Mason and Idol's upcoming NWA Worlds Heavyweight Championship match. Since Idol and Latimer won, Idol chose the stipulation: a No Limits match.; (c) / – the champion(s) heading into the match
250 (S26E12)	"Episode 250"	February 21, 2026	Tampa, FL	March 17, 2026
Matches: No. / Results / Stipulations; 1 / The Immortals (Kratos and Odinson) defeated Jack Valor and Eddie Grayson by pinfall / Tag team match; 2 / Sins n' Grins (Izzy James and Bam Bam Malone) defeated Brady Pierce and Corey Hollis, The Lost (Alex Misery and Gaagz the Gymp), and The Pretty City Express (Devin Reno and Christipher Landon Anthony Streeter) by pinfall / Four-way tag team match to determine the #16a seed in the Crockett Cup; 3 / Liviyah Vale defeated Tiffany Nieves (c) (with Miss Starr and Gretta) by disqualification / Singles match for the NWA World Women's Television Championship; 4 / KC Cazana (with Joe Cazana) defeated Jake Cross by pinfall / Singles match; 5 / Hammerstone defeated Carnage by pinfall / Singles match; (c) / – the champion(s) heading into the match
251 (S26E13)	"Housebroken"	February 21, 2026	Tampa, FL	March 24, 2026
Matches: No. / Results / Stipulations; 1 / The Good Brothers (Doc Gallows and Karl Anderson) defeated The McCord Collection (Zyon and Bonez) (with Brandon McCord) by pinfall / Crockett Cup first round match; 2 / Damian Fenrir defeated Will Austin by pinfall / Singles match; 3 / The Colóns (Primo Colón and Epico Colón) defeated Red, White, & JAC'd (Wrecking Ball Legursky and JAC) by pinfall / Crockett Cup first round match; 4 / Carson Bartholomew Drake (with Aron Stevens and Lockjaw Drake) defeated Chico Adams by pinfall / Singles match; 5 / Kylie Paige (with Tommy Henry) defeated "HollyHood" Haley J by pinfall / Singles match
252 (S26E14)	"Party People"	February 21, 2026	Tampa, FL	March 31, 2026
Matches: No. / Results / Stipulations; 1 / The Wrestling Machines (Mike Mondo and Spencer Slade) (with Aron Stevens) defeated The Holy Grail Experience (Pretty Boy Smooth and Hayden Backlund) (with Pastor C-Lo) by submission / Crockett Cup first round match; 2 / Natalia Markova defeated Herra by pinfall / Singles match; 3 / The Southern Six (Kerry Morton and Alex Taylor) defeated The Hard Way (Jack Vaughn and Dalton McKenzie) by pinfall / Crockett Cup first round match; 4 / Eric Smalls defeated Daisy Kill by pinfall / Singles match This was part of the Daisy Kill "Reign of Terror" open challenge; 5 / Kenzie Paige (with Tommy Henry) defeated Sirena Veil by disqualification / Singles match to determine the number one contender to the NWA World Women's Championship
253 (S26E15)	"Booster Shot"	February 21, 2026	Tampa, FL	April 7, 2026
Matches: No. / Results / Stipulations; 1 / "Thrillbilly" Silas Mason (c) defeated Bryan Idol by pinfall / No Limits match for the NWA Worlds Heavyweight Championship; 2 / Hayden Backlund defeated Cristiano Argento and Will Austin by submission / "Gut Check Challenge" three-way match for an immediate NWA National Heavyweight Championship match; 3 / Mike Mondo (c) (with Aron Stevens) defeated Hayden Backlund by pinfall / Singles match for the NWA National Heavyweight Championship; 4 / The Hex (Allysin Kay and Marti Belle) (c) defeated TV-MA (Tiffany Nieves and Gretta) (with Miss Starr) by pinfall / Tag team match for the NWA World Women's Tag Team Championship; 5 / Natalia Markova (c) defeated Liviyah Vale by pinfall / Singles match for the NWA World Women's Championship; (c) / – the champion(s) heading into the match
254 (S26E16)	"Bury the Hatchet"	February 21, 2026	Tampa, FL	April 14, 2026
Matches: No. / Results / Stipulations; 1 / The Country Gentlemen (AJ Cazana and KC Cazana) (with Joe Cazana) defeated Trevor Murdoch and Tyler Franks (with Mike Knox) by pinfall / Crockett Cup first round match; 2 / The Slimeballz (Sage Chantz and Tommy Rant) defeated Da Pope and Mims by pinfall / Crockett Cup first round match; 3 / JAC defeated Richard Adonis by pinfall / Singles match; 4 / Thom Latimer and El Dragón Nihan defeated Carson Bartholomew Drake and Tyler Stevens (with Aron Stevens, Mike Mondo, Spencer Slade, Lockjaw Drake, Sage Chantz, and Tommy Rant) by pinfall / Crockett Cup first round match
255 (S26E17)	"Episode 255"	February 21, 2026	Tampa, FL	April 21, 2026
Matches: No. / Results / Stipulations; 1 / Damian Fenrir defeated Alex Misery and Ethan Tornadeau by pinfall / "Submission Challenge" three-way match for an immediate NWA World Junior Heavyweight Championship match; 2 / Spencer Slade (c) (with Aron Stevens) defeated Damian Fenrir by submission / Singles match for the NWA World Junior Heavyweight Championship; 3 / Bonez (with Brandon McCord) defeated Gaggz the Gymp by submission / Singles match; 4 / Pretty Boy Smooth (with Pastor C-Lo) defeated Big Cuzzo by pinfall / Singles match; 5 / The Pretty City Express (Devin Reno and Christopher Landon Anthony Streeter) defeated Jack Valor and Eddie Grayson by pinfall / Tag team match; 6 / Bryan Idol defeated Carnage by pinfall / No Limits match; (c) / – the champion(s) heading into the match
256 (S26E18)	"Doctor's Orders"	February 21, 2026	Tampa, FL	April 28, 2026
Matches: No. / Results / Stipulations; 1 / Dr. Vik (with Miss Starr and Gretta) defeated Wrecking Ball Legursky by countout / Singles match for an NWA Worlds Heavyweight Championship match later in the night; 2 / The Good Brothers (Doc Gallows and Karl Anderson) defeated The Rewind Society (Samuel C and VHS) by pinfall / Tag team match; 3 / "HollyHood" Haley J and Sirena Veil defeated Pretty Empowered (Kenzie Paige and Kylie Paige) by pinfall / Tag team match to determine the number one contender to the NWA World Women's Championship; Since Veil got the pin, she earned a title opportunity at the Crockett Cup. Had Pretty Empowered won, Kenzie would've remained number one contender while Veil and Haley would be unable to challenge for the title for one year.; 4 / Daisy Kill defeated Eric Smalls by pinfall / Lethal Ladder match A Shanghai pain stick was placed atop the ladder.; 5 / "Thrillbilly" Silas Mason (c) defeated Dr. Vik (with Miss Starr and Gretta) by pinfall / Singles match for the NWA Worlds Heavyweight Championship; (c) / – the champion(s) heading into the match

=== Season 27: NWA 78 ===
No.	Title	Taped date	Location	Original air date
257 (S27E1)	"Bracket Buster"	April 4, 2026	Forney, TX	May 1, 2026
Matches: No. / Results / Stipulations; 1 / Titans of Calamity (Ren Ayabe and Talos) defeated Jack Valor and Eddie Grayson, Devastation Reborn (AJ Farat and Frank Stone), and Death Row Militia (Leo Fox and Colt Killbane) by pinfall / Four-way tag team match to determine the #16b seed in the Crockett Cup; 2 / Titans of Calamity (Ren Ayabe and Talos) defeated Sins n' Grins (Izzy James and Bam Bam Malone) by pinfall / Tag team play-in match to determine the #16 seed in the Crockett Cup; 3 / Gisele Shaw defeated Tiffany Nieves (c) (with Miss Starr and Gretta) by pinfall / Singles match for the NWA World Women's Television Championship; 4 / Titans of Calamity (Ren Ayabe and Talos) defeated The Immortals (Kratos and Odinson) by pinfall / Crockett Cup first round match; (c) / – the champion(s) heading into the match
258 (S27E2)	"The Next Day"	April 4, 2026	Forney, TX	May 2, 2026
Matches: No. / Results / Stipulations; 1 / Alex Misery (with Brandon McCord) defeated Damian Fenrir by pinfall / Singles match to determine the number one contender to the NWA World Junior Heavyweight Championship; 2 / The Wrestling Machines (Mike Mondo and Spencer Slade) (with Aron Stevens) defeated The Southern Six (Kerry Morton and Alex Taylor) (with Ricky Morton) by submission / Crockett Cup quarterfinal match; 3 / The Country Gentlemen (AJ Cazana and KC Cazana) (with Joe Cazana) defeated The Colóns (Primo Colón and Epico Colón) by pinfall / Crockett Cup quarterfinal match; 4 / Pretty Boy Smooth (with Pastor C-Lo) defeated Trevor Murdoch by pinfall / Singles match
259 (S27E2)	"Run The Gauntlet"	April 4, 2026	Forney, TX	May 9, 2026
Matches: No. / Results / Stipulations; 1 / The Good Brothers (Doc Gallows and Karl Anderson) defeated The Slimeballz (Sage Chantz and Tommy Rant) (with Aron Stevens) by pinfall / Crockett Cup quarterfinal match; 2 / Titans of Calamity (Ren Ayabe and Talos) defeated Thom Latimer and El Dragón Nihan by pinfall / Crockett Cup quarterfinal match; 3 / Tiffany Nieves won by last eliminating Gretta; Other participants in order of elimination: Shay KarMichael, "HollyHood" Haley J, Morgan Mercy, Herra, Kenzie Paige, and Kylie Paige / Burke Invitational Gauntlet to determine the number one contender to the NWA World Women's Championship
260 (S27E4)	"The Final Four"	April 4, 2026	Forney, TX	May 16, 2026
Matches: No. / Results / Stipulations; 1 / Carson Bartholomew Drake (with Aron Stevens and Lockjaw Drake) defeated Wrecking Ball Legursky by pinfall / Singles match; 2 / Titans of Calamity (Ren Ayabe and Talos) defeated The Wrestling Machines (Mike Mondo and Spencer Slade) (with Aron Stevens) by pinfall / Crockett Cup semifinal match; 3 / The Country Gentlemen (AJ Cazana and KC Cazana) (with Joe Cazana) defeated The Good Brothers (Doc Gallows and Karl Anderson) by pinfall / Crockett Cup semifinal match; 4 / Natalia Markova (c) defeated Sirena Veil / Singles match for the NWA World Women's Championship; 5 / Tiffany Nieves (with Gretta and Miss Starr) defeated Natalia Markova (c) by pinfall / Singles match for the NWA World Women's Championship; This was Nieves' Burke Invitational Gauntlet cash-in match.; (c) / – the champion(s) heading into the match
261 (S27E5)	"2026 Crockett Cup Finals"	April 4, 2026	Forney, TX	May 23, 2026
Matches: No. / Results / Stipulations; 1 / Eric Smalls defeated Daisy Kill by pinfall / Kiss My Boots match; 2 / "Thrillbilly" Silas Mason (c) (with Kerry Morton, Alex Taylor, and Ricky Morton) defeated Bryan Idol by pinfall / No Limits Falls Count Anywhere match for the NWA World's Heavyweight Championship; 3 / Titans of Calamity (Ren Ayabe and Talos) defeated The Country Gentlemen (AJ Cazana and KC Cazana) (with Joe Cazana) by pinfall / Crockett Cup final; (c) / – the champion(s) heading into the match
262 (S27E6)	"Southern Fried Betrayal"	April 25, 2026	Tampa, FL	May 30, 2026
Matches: No. / Results / Stipulations; 1 / Pretty Boy Smooth (with Pastor C-Lo) defeated Mike Knox (with Trevor Murdoch) by submission / Singles match; 2 / Gisele Shaw (c) vs. Sirena Veil ended in a time limit draw / Singles match for the NWA World Women's Television Championship; 3 / Alex Taylor defeated Axton Ray by pinfall / Singles match; 4 / The Country Gentlemen (AJ Cazana and KC Cazana) (with Joe Cazana) defeated The Immortals (Kratos and Odinson) (c) by pinfall / Tag team match for the NWA World Tag Team Championship; (c) / – the champion(s) heading into the match
263 (S27E7)	"Larger Than Life"	April 25, 2026	Tampa, FL	June 6, 2026
Matches: No. / Results / Stipulations; 1 / Alex Misery (with Brandon McCord) defeated Lockjaw Drake (with Aron Stevens), Daisy Kill, Wrecking Ball Legursky, and JAC by pinfall / Five-way scramble for the vacant NWA World Television Championship; 2 / Carnage defeated Mims (with Da Pope) by pinfall / Singles match; 3 / The Slimeballz (Sage Chantz and Tommy Rant) (c) defeated Jack Valor and Eddie Grayson by pinfall / Tag team match for the NWA United States Tag Team Championship; 4 / Gretta (with Tiffany Nieves and Miss Starr) defeated Natalia Markova by pinfall / Singles match; (c) / – the champion(s) heading into the match
264 (S27E8)	"Hex Markes the Spot"	April 25, 2026	Tampa, FL	June 13, 2026
Matches: No. / Results / Stipulations; 1 / Carson Bartholomew Drake (with Aron Stevens) defeated Tyler Franks (with Mike Knox and Trevor Murdoch) by pinfall / Singles match; 2 / Damian Fenrir defeated Bonez (with Brandon McCord and Gilroy) by pinfall / Singles match; 3 / Thom Latimer defeated Cristiano Argento by pinfall / Singles match; 4 / Pretty Empowered (Kenzie Paige and Kylie Paige) (with Tommy Henry) defeated The Hex (Allysin Kay and Marti Belle) (c), and Clara Carter and "HollyHood" Haley J by pinfall / Three-way tag team match for the NWA World Women's Tag Team Championship; (c) / – the champion(s) heading into the match
265 (S27E9)	"Dragon Rage"	April 25, 2026	Tampa, FL	June 20, 2026
Matches: No. / Results / Stipulations; 1 / Kerry Morton defeated Vin Parker by pinfall / Singles match; 2 / Tiffany Nieves (c) (with Gretta and Miss Starr) defeated Gina Sais Quoi by submission / Singles match for the NWA World Women's Championship; 3 / Terry Yaki defeated Hayden Backlund and Jay Lucas by pinfall / "Submission Challenge" three-way match for an immediate NWA World Junior Heavyweight Championship match; 4 / Spencer Slade (c) (with Aron Stevens) defeated Terry Yaki by submission / Singles match for the NWA World Junior Heavyweight Championship; 5 / "Thrillbilly" Silas Mason (c) defeated El Dragón Nihan by pinfall / Singles match for the NWA World's Heavyweight Championship; (c) / – the champion(s) heading into the match
266 (S27E10)	"Kings Will Be Crowned"	April 25, 2026	Tampa, FL	June 27, 2026
Matches: No. / Results / Stipulations; 1 / Da Pope (with Mims) defeated Richard Adonis by pinfall / Singles match; 2 / Big Cuzzo defeated Eric Smalls by pinfall / Singles match This was Eric Smalls' "Big Challenge"; 3 / Mike Mondo (c) (with Aron Stevens) (c) defeated Bryan Idol by pinfall / Singles match for the NWA National Heavyweight Championship; 4 / The Country Gentlemen (AJ Cazana and KC Cazana) (c) (with Joe Cazana) defeated Thom Latimer and El Dragón Nihan by pinfall / Tag team match for the NWA World Tag Team Championship; (c) / – the champion(s) heading into the match
267 (S27E11)	"The Light Shines on Thee"	April 25, 2026	Tampa, FL	July 4, 2026
Matches: No. / Results / Stipulations; 1 / Alex Taylor defeated Tony Leyenda by pinfall / Singles match; 2 / Carnage and Cristino Argento defeated Da Pope and Mims (with The Light) by pinfall / Tag team match; 3 / Damian Fenrir defeated Vin Parker by pinfall / Singles match; 4 / Natalia Markova and Gisele Shaw defeated TV-MA (Tiffany Nieves and Gretta) (with Miss Starr) by disqualification / Tag team match The winning team earned the right to choose the stipulation for Nieves and Markova's NWA World Women's Championship match at Hard Times 6. Since Markova and Shaw won, Markova chose the stipulation: a No Holds Barred match.
268 (S27E12)	"All Rise"	April 25, 2026	Tampa, FL	July 11, 2026
Matches: No. / Results / Stipulations; 1 / Kerry Morton defeated Axton Ray by pinfall / Singles match; 2 / The Hard Way (Jack Vaughn and Dalton McKenzie) defeated Jeff Paul and Tyler Stevens, Death Row Militia (Leo Fox and MurderMan KillBane), and Top Team (Jay Lucas and Terry Yaki) by pinfall / "Slimeballz Invitational" to determine the number one contender to the NWA United States Tag Team Championship; 3 / "Magic" Jake Dumas defeated Chico Adams by pinfall / Singles match; 4 / Carson Bartholomew Drake (with Aron Stevens) defeated Richard Adonis by pinfall / Singles match; 5 / The Royal Court (Mike Knox and Tyler Franks) (with King Trevor Murdoch I) defeated The Holy Grail Experience (Pretty Boy Smooth and Hayden Backlund) (with Pastor C-Lo) by pinfall / Tag team match
269 (S27E13)	"Third Party"	April 25, 2026	Tampa, FL	July 18, 2026
Matches: No. / Results / Stipulations; 1 / Sirena Veil defeated Herra by pinfall / Singles match; 2 / JAC (with Eric Smalls) defeated Big Cuzzo (with Daisy Kill) by pinfall / Singles match; 3 / The Federation of Champions (Buster, Lockjaw Drake, Sage Chantz, and Tommy Rant) (with Aron Stevens) defeated The McCord Collection (Brandon McCord, Alex Misery, Gilroy, and Bonez) by pinfall / Eight-man tag team match; 4 / Pretty Empowered (Kenzie Paige and Kylie Paige) (c) (with Tommy Henry) defeated The Hex (Allysin Kay and Marti Belle) by pinfall / Tag team match for the NWA World Women's Tag Team Championship; 5 / "Thrillbilly" Silas Mason (c) defeated Kerry Morton by countout / Singles match for the NWA World's Heavyweight Championship; Alex Taylor will be the special guest referee; (c) / – the champion(s) heading into the match
270 (S27E14)	"The King's Men"	April 25, 2026	Tampa, FL	July 25, 2026
Matches: No. / Results / Stipulations; 1 / Jack Valor and Eddie Grayson defeated The Immortals (Kratos and Odinson) by pinfall / Tag team match Had The Immortals won, they would have earned an NWA World Tag Team Championship match.; 2 / King Trevor Murdoch I defeated Brandon Groom by pinfall / Singles match; 3 / "HollyHood" Haley J defeated Gina Sais Quoi by pinfall / Singles match; 4 / The Wrestling Machines (Mike Mondo and Spencer Slade) (with Aron Stevens) defeated "Thrillbilly" Silas Mason and Bryan Idol by pinfall / Tag team match
271 (S27E15)	"Morton Hunter"	June 6, 2026	Atlanta, GA	August 1, 2026
Matches: No. / Results / Stipulations; 1 / Damian Fenrir defeated Spencer Slade (c) (with Aron Stevens) by disqualification / Singles match for the NWA World Junior Heavyweight Championship; 2 / The Hardway (Jack Vaughn and Dalton McKenzie) defeated The Slimeballz (Sage Chantz and Tommy Rant) (c) (with Aron Stevens) by pinfall / Tag team match for the NWA United States Tag Team Championship; 3 / Hammerstone defeated Richard Adonis by pinfall / Singles match; 4 / Pretty Empowered (Kenzie Paige and Kylie Paige) (c) (with Tommy Henry) defeated Sirena Veil and Alice Crowley (with Paige Collett) by pinfall / Tag team match for the NWA World Women's Tag Team Championship; (c) / – the champion(s) heading into the match
272 (S27E16)	"Roll Call"	June 6, 2026	Atlanta, GA	August 8, 2026
Matches: No. / Results / Stipulations; 1 / Alex Misery (c) (with Brandon McCord) defeated Daisy Kill (with Big Cuzzo) by pinfall / Singles match for the NWA World Television Championship; 2 / The Federation of Champions (Buster and Lockjaw Drake) (with Aron Stevens) defeated Jack Valor and Eddie Grayson by pinfall / Tag team match; 3 / Da Pope defeated Carnage by disqualification / Singles match; 4 / Gretta (with Tiffany Nieves and Miss Starr) defeated Natalia Markova by pinfall / No Limits match Since Gretta won, Nieves could choose the stipulation for her and Markova's upcoming title match. Had Markova won, Nieves would have had to relinquish the NWA World Women's Championship.; (c) / – the champion(s) heading into the match
273 (S27E17)	"Unthinkable"	June 6, 2026	Atlanta, GA	August 15, 2026
Matches: No. / Results / Stipulations; 1 / Thom Latimer defeated El Dragón Nihan (with Brandon McCord) by pinfall / No Disqualification, No Countout match; 2 / Colby Corino defeated Axton Ray by pinfall / Singles match; 3 / The Royal Court (King Trevor Murdoch I, Sir Michael, Duke of Knox and Squier Franks) (with Jacob the Necromancer) defeated Mims and The Light by pinfall / Six-man tag team match; 4 / Bryan Idol defeated Mike Mondo (c) (with Aron Stevens) by pinfall / Singles match for the NWA National Championship; (c) / – the champion(s) heading into the match
274 (S27E18)	"Southern Justice"	June 6, 2026	Atlanta, GA	August 22, 2026
Matches: No. / Results / Stipulations; 1 / Gisele Shaw (c) defeated Liviyah by pinfall / Singles match for the NWA World Women's Television Championship; 2 / Kratos defeated Effy by pinfall / Singles match; 3 / Carson Batholomew Drake (with Aron Stevens) defeated Pretty Boy Smooth (with Pastor C-Lo) by pinfall / Singles match to determine the #1 contender for the NWA World's Heavyweight Championship; 4 / "Thrilbilly" Silas Mason (c) defeated Kerry Morton (with Ricky Morton) by pinfall / Singles match for the NWA World's Heavyweight Championship; Alex Taylor was the special guest referee.; (c) / – the champion(s) heading into the match

=== Season 28: EmPowerrr 2026 and Samhain: Part IV ===
No.	Title	Taped date	Location	Original air date
275 (S28E1)	"Face-Off"	July 25, 2026	Philadelphia, PA	August 29, 2026
Matches: No. / Results / Stipulations; 1 / Sirena Veil and Alice Crowley (with Paige Collett) defeated Liviyah and Corrine Joy by pinfall / Tag team match; 2 / Alex Misery (c) vs. El Dragón Nihan ended in a time-limit draw / Singles match for the NWA World Television Championship; 3 / Hayden Backlund defeated Axton Ray, Damian Fenrir and Richard Adonis by pinfall / Four-way match for the vacant NWA World Junior Heavyweight Championship; 4 / Kerry Morton defeated Colby Corino by pinfall / Singles match; (c) / – the champion(s) heading into the match
276 (S28E2)	"Tricky Stipulation"	July 25, 2026	Philadelphia, PA	September 5, 2026
Matches: No. / Results / Stipulations; 1 / The Hardway (Jack Vaughn and Dalton McKenzie) (c) defeated Jack Valor and Eddie Grayson by pinfall / Tag team match for the NWA United States Tag Team Championship; 2 / Daisy Kill (with Big Cuzzo) defeated Eric Smalls by touching the four corners / Dog Collar match; 3 / Thom Latimer and Hammerstone defeated Da Pope and Mims by pinfall / Tag team match; 4 / Tiffany Nieves (c) (with Miss Starr) defeated Gretta and Natalia Markova by pinfall / Three-way match for the NWA World Women's Championship; (c) / – the champion(s) heading into the match
277 (S28E3)	"Hear Ye, Hear Ye!"	July 25, 2026	Philadelphia, PA	September 12, 2026
Matches: No. / Results / Stipulations; 1 / Sirena Veil (with Paige Collett) defeated Gisele Shaw (c) (with Lou D'Angeli) by pinfall / Singles match for the NWA World Women's Television Championship; 2 / Bryan Idol (c) defeated Spencer Slade and Mike Mondo by retrieving the belt / Three-way ladder match for the NWA National Heavyweight Championship; 3 / The Royal Court (King Trevor Murdoch I, Sir Michael, Duke of Knox, Squire Franks, and Jacob the Necromancer) defeated The Kingdom of Slimedom (Sage Chantz, Tommy Rant, Buster, and Lockjaw Drake) / Knights of the Round Table match; (c) / – the champion(s) heading into the match
278 (S28E4)	"Texas Deathmatch"	July 25, 2026	Philadelphia, PA	September 19, 2026
Matches: No. / Results / Stipulations; 1 / The Country Gentlemen (AJ Cazana and KC Cazana) (c) (with Joe Cazana) defeated Blunt Force Trauma (Carnage and Damage) by pinfall / Tag team match for the NWA World Tag Team Championship; 2 / Heath defeated Pretty Boy Smooth (with Pastor C-Lo), Effy, Kratos, and Talos by pinfall / Five-way match to determine the #1 contender for the NWA World's Heavyweight Championship; 3 / Alex Taylor defeated Ricky Morton (with Kerry Morton) by pinfall / Texas Deathmatch; (c) / – the champion(s) heading into the match
279 (S28E5)	"Dungeon Master"	July 25, 2026	Philadelphia, PA	September 26, 2026
Matches: No. / Results / Stipulations; 1 / Nattie Neidhart defeated Kenzie Paige and Kylie Paige by submission / Three-way match; 2 / "Thrillbilly" Silas Mason (c) defeated Carson Batholomew Drake (with Aron Stevens) by referee stoppage / Singles match for the NWA Worlds Heavyweight Championship; (c) / – the champion(s) heading into the match
280 (S28E6)	"Head Case"	August 22, 2026	Tampa, FL	October 3, 2026
Matches: No. / Results / Stipulations; 1 / Tiffany Nieves (c) (with Miss Starr, Gretta, and Shamar Amor) defeated Joiya Blake by pinfall / Singles match for the NWA World Women's Championship; 2 / Heath defeated Richard Adonis by pinfall / Singles match; 3 / Hayden Backlund (c) defeated Nick Blackwell and Vin Parker by submission / Three-way match for the NWA World Junior Heavyweight Championship; 4 / Kratos defeated Romeo Quevedo by pinfall / Singles match; 5 / The Country Gentlemen (AJ Cazana and KC Cazana) (c) (with Joe Cazana) defeated The Slimeballz (Sage Chantz and Tommy Rant) by pinfall / Tag team match for the NWA World Tag Team Championship; (c) / – the champion(s) heading into the match
281 (S28E7)	"Everybody Knows"	August 22, 2026	Tampa, FL	October 10, 2026
Matches: No. / Results / Stipulations; 1 / Alex Taylor defeated Buster (with Lockjaw Drake) by disqualification / Singles match; 2 / The Hardway (Jack Vaughn and Dalton McKenzie) (c) defeated The McCord Collection (Gilroy and Bonez) (with Brandon McCord) by pinfall / Tag team match for the NWA United States Tag Team Championship; 3 / Natalia Markova defeated Mazzerati by pinfall / Singles match; 4 / The Federation of Champions (Carson Batholomew Drake, Mike Mondo and Spencer Slade) (with Aron Stevens and Lockjaw Drake) defeated "Thrilbilly" Silas Mason, Thom Latimer and Bryan Idol by pinfall / Six-man tag team match; (c) / – the champion(s) heading into the match
282 (S28E8)	"With or Without You"	August 22, 2026	Tampa, FL	October 17, 2026
Matches: No. / Results / Stipulations; 1 / Sirena Veil (c) (with Paige Collett) defeated Bobbi Thunder by pinfall / Singles match for the NWA World Women's Television Championship; 2 / Alex Misery (c) (with Brandon McCord) defeated Tony Leyenda by pinfall / Singles match for the NWA World Television Championship; 3 / Axton Ray and Shawn Carlson defeated Pretty Boy Smooth and Effy (with Pastor C-Lo) by pinfall / Tag team match; 4 / Gretta (with Tiffany Nieves, Miss Starr, and Shamar Amor) defeated Ruby Red by pinfall / Singles match; 5 / Mims defeated Da Pope by disqualification / Singles match; (c) / – the champion(s) heading into the match
283 (S28E9)	"Bloodlines"	August 22, 2026	Tampa, FL	October 24, 2026
Matches: No. / Results / Stipulations; 1 / The Royal Court (Sir Michael, Duke of Knox and Squire Franks) (with King Trevor Murdoch I and Jacob the Necromancer) defeated Cristiano Argento and A Man Known as Frank (with Brandon McCord) by pinfall / Tag team match; 2 / Daisy Kill (with Big Cuzzo) defeated Charlie Adams (with Eric Smalls) by pinfall / Singles match; 3 / Blunt Force Trauma (Carnage and Damage) defeated Jack Valor and Eddie Grayson by pinfall / Tag team match; 4 / Kerry Morton (with Julie Cutler) defeated Colby Corino by pinfall / Singles match
284 (S28E10)	"Twisted Sisters"	August 22, 2026	Tampa, FL	October 31, 2026
Matches: No. / Results / Stipulations; 1 / The Slimeballz (Sage Chantz and Tommy Rant) (with Aron Stevens) defeated Blunt Force Trauma (Carnage and Damage) by pinfall / No Disqualification match; 2 / Hayden Backlund (c) defeated Damian Fenrir by submission / Singles match for the NWA World Junior Heavyweight Championship; 3 / Carson Batholomew Drake (with Aron Stevens) defeated Charlie Adams by pinfall / Singles match; 4 / Liviyah and Mackenzie Morgan defeated Pretty Empowered (Kenzie Paige and Kylie Paige) (c) (with Tommy Henry) by 2–0 / Two out of three falls match for the NWA World Women's Tag Team Championship; (c) / – the champion(s) heading into the match
285 (S28E11)	"Within the Hollow Crown"	August 22, 2026	Tampa, FL	November 7, 2026
Matches: No. / Results / Stipulations; 1 / The Royal Court (King Trevor Murdoch I, Sir Michael, Duke of Knox, Squire Franks, and Jacob the Necromancer) defeated The McCord Collection (Cristiano Argento, A Man Known as Frank, Bonez, and Brandon McCord) by pinfall / Eight man tag team match; 2 / Alex Misery (c) vs. Kratos ended in a time-limit draw / Singles match for the NWA World Television Championship; 3 / Tiffany Nieves (c) (with Miss Starr, Gretta, and Shamar Amor) defeated Ruby Red by forfeit / Singles match for the NWA World Women's Championship; 4 / "Thrillbilly" Silas Mason and Alex Taylor defeated The Federation of Champions (Buster and Lockjaw Drake) by pinfall / Tag team match; (c) / – the champion(s) heading into the match
286 (S28E12)	"The Giant Killer"	August 22, 2026	Tampa, FL	November 14, 2026
Matches: No. / Results / Stipulations; 1 / The Country Gentlemen (AJ Cazana and KC Cazana) (c) (with Joe Cazana) defeated Live Danger (Danger Ross and LiveWire Charlie) by pinfall / Tag team match for the NWA World Tag Team Championship; 2 / Talos vs. Eric Smalls ended in a no contest / Singles match; 3 / Kerry Morton defeated Ace Lee, Colby Corino and Nick Blackwell by pinfall / Beat the Clock Challenge; 4 / The Hardway (Jack Vaughn and Dalton McKenzie) (c) defeated Death Row Militia (Leo Fox and Colt Killbane) by pinfall / Tag team match for the NWA United States Tag Team Championship; 5 / Natalia Markova defeated Gretta (with Tiffany Nieves, Miss Starr, and Shamar Amor) by disqualification / Singles match Since Markova won, she earned an NWA World Women's Championship match at Samhain: Part IV. Had Markova lost, she would have never challenged for the NWA World Women's Championship again.; (c) / – the champion(s) heading into the match
287 (S28E13)	"Episode 287"	August 22, 2026	Tampa, FL	November 21, 2026
Matches: No. / Results / Stipulations; 1 / Liviyah and Mackenzie Morgan (c) defeated Kenzie Paige and Joyia Blake and Kylie Paige and Gina Sais Quoi by pinfall / Three-way tag team match for the NWA World Women's Tag Team Championship; 2 / Eddie Grayson (with Jack Valor) defeated Axton Ray by pinfall / Singles match; 3 / Sirena Veil (c) (with Paige Collett) defeated Mazzerati by pinfall / Singles match for the NWA World Women's Television Championship; 4 / Da Pope defeated Mims by pinfall / Empty Arena Street Fight; (c) / – the champion(s) heading into the match

== List of NWA Powerrr Surge episodes ==
No.	Title	Taped date	Location	Original air date
1 (S4E1)	"Premiere"	March 21, 2021	Atlanta, GA	April 13, 2021
Matches: No. / Results / Stipulations; 1 / Mims defeated Jeremiah Plunkett by pinfall / Singles match
2 (S4E2)	"Season 4, Episode 2"	N/A	Atlanta, GA	May 4, 2021
Matches: No. / Results / Stipulations; 1 / Jennacide defeated Skye Blue by pinfall / Singles match
3 (S4E3)	"Season 4, Episode 3"	N/A	Atlanta, GA	June 1, 2021
Matches: No. / Results / Stipulations; 1 / Sal Rinauro and Tim Storm defeated Hawx Aerie (Luke Hawx and PJ Hawx) by pinfall / Tag team match
4 (S5E1)	"Season 5, Episode 1"	N/A	Atlanta, GA	July 13, 2021
Matches: No. / Results / Stipulations; 1 / Marshe Rockett defeated Jeremiah Plunkett by pinfall / Singles match; 2 / Jordan Clearwater (with BLK Jeez) defeated Papa Jive and Rush Freeman by pinfall / Three-way match; 3 / David Arquette and Tim Storm defeated The Kingdom of Jocephus (Jocephus and the Spiritual Advisor) by pinfall / David Arquette's hair vs. Jocephus' hair tag team match
5 (S6E1)	"Season 6, Episode 1"	N/A	St. Louis, MO	September 21, 2021
Matches: No. / Results / Stipulations; 1 / Colby Corino defeated Marshe Rockett by pinfall / Singles match; 2 / Skye Blue defeated Tootie Lynn and Thunder Kitty by pinfall / Three-way match; 3 / Mims defeated BLK Jeez by pinfall / Singles match
6 (S6E2)	"Season 6, Episode 2"	N/A	St. Louis, MO	October 19, 2021
Matches: No. / Results / Stipulations; 1 / Jeremiah Plunkett defeated Heartthrob Jaden by pinfall / Singles match; 2 / Thom Latimer defeated Tim Storm by pinfall / Singles match; 3 / Kamille (c) defeated Leyla Hirsch by pinfall / Singles match for the NWA World Women's Championship; (c) / – the champion(s) heading into the match
7 (S6E3)	"Season 6, Episode 3"	N/A	St. Louis, MO	November 17, 2021
Matches: No. / Results / Stipulations; 1 / JTG vs. Slice Boogie ended in a no contest / Singles match; 2 / Kiera Hogan defeated Kenzie Paige by pinfall / Singles match; 3 / Melina defeated Skye Blue via submission / Singles match; 4 / BLK Jeez (with Austin Idol, Jordan Clearwater, and Tyrus) defeated Captain YUMA by pinfall / Singles match; 5 / The End (Odinson and Parrow) defeated Hawx Aerie (Luke Hawx and PJ Hawx) by pinfall / NWA World Tag Team Championship Eliminator Tournament Finals; Winners receive an NWA World Tag Team Championship match at Hard Times
8 (S7E1)	"Joe Galli's Christmas Celebration"	December 5, 2021	Atlanta, GA	December 21, 2021
Matches: No. / Results / Stipulations; 1 / Captain YUMA defeated Fable Jake by pinfall / Singles match; 2 / Jaden Roller defeated Rush Freeman by pinfall / Singles match to determine the No. 1 contender to the NWA World Television Championship; 3 / Jay Bradley (with Wrecking Ball Legursky) defeated Diante by pinfall / Singles match
9 (S7E2)	"Meet The Fixers"	December 6, 2021	Atlanta, GA	January 26, 2022
Matches: No. / Results / Stipulations; 1 / Rodney Mack defeated D'Vin Graves via submission / Singles match; 2 / Austin Aries defeated Rhett Titus by pinfall / NWA World Junior Heavyweight Championship quarter final match; 3 / Kylie Rae defeated Madi Wrenkowski via submission / Singles match; 4 / The Fixers (Jay Bradley and Wrecking Ball Legursky) defeated Fable Jake & Miguel Robles by pinfall / Tag team match
10 (S7E3)	"Season 7, Episode 3"	December 5 & 6, 2021	Atlanta, GA	March 15, 2022
Matches: No. / Results / Stipulations; 1 / J Spade defeated Sal Rinauro (with Danny Deals) by pinfall / Singles match; 2 / Allysin Kay (with Marti Belle) defeated Missa Kate by pinfall / Singles match; 3 / Judais (with Father James Mitchell) defeated Jamie Stanley by pinfall / Singles match
11 (S8E1)	"Velvet After Dark"	March 21, 2022	Nashville, TN	April 19, 2022
Matches: No. / Results / Stipulations; 1 / Cyon defeated Garrisaon Creed by pinfall / Singles match; 2 / Paola Blaze defeated Tootie Lynn by pinfall / Singles match; 3 / Church's Money Enterprises (BLK Jeez and Marshe Rockett) defeated The Rude Dudes (El Rudo and Jamie Stanley) by pinfall / Tag team match
12 (S10E1)	"Pretty Empowered Surge"	August 29, 2022	Nashville, TN	September 27, 2022
Matches: No. / Results / Stipulations; 1 / Marti Belle defeated Madi Wrenkowski by pinfall / Singles match; 2 / The Dirty Sexy Boys (Dirty Dango and JTG) and The Miserably Faithful (Sal The Pal and Gaagz The Gymp) defeated The Ill Begotten (Alex Taylor and Jeremiah Plunkett) and The Spectaculars (Brady Pierce and Rush Freeman) (with Danny Dealz and Rolando Freeman) by pinfall / Strange Bedfellows eight-man tag team match; 3 / Rhett Titus defeated Bestia 666 (with Damián 666) / Singles match; 4 / The NOW (Hale Collins and Vik Dalishus) defeated Cyon (with Austin Idol) by countout / Handicap match; 5 / Kamille (c) defeated Max the Impaler (with Father James Mitchell) by pinfall / Singles match for the NWA World Women's Championship; (c) / – the champion(s) heading into the match
13 (S10E2)	"Velvet After Dark"	August 30, 2022	Nashville, TN	October 22, 2022
Matches: No. / Results / Stipulations; 1 / Anthony Andrews defeated Traxx by pinfall / Singles match; 2 / Eric Jackson defeated Sodapop Hendrix by pinfall / Singles match; 3 / Rolando Freeman defeated KC Roxx (with Aron Stevens) by pinfall / Singles match; 4 / Jax Dane (with Chris Silvio, Esq.) defeated Sal The Pal by pinfall / Singles match
