= RPW Heavyweight Championship =

Professional wrestling championship

Details
- Promotion: Resistance Pro Wrestling
- Date established: January 13, 2012
- Current champion: Shane Mercer
- Date won: May 18, 2019
Statistics
- First champion: Harry Smith
- Most reigns: Da Cobra (2)
- Longest reign: Shane Mercer (2,493+)
- Shortest reign: Daniel Eads (<1 day)

The Resistance Pro Wrestling Heavyweight Championship is a professional wrestling heavyweight championship and the highest ranked title in the promotion.

== Title history ==
#	Order in reign history
Reign	The reign number for the specific set of wrestlers listed
Event	The event promoted by the respective promotion in which the titles were won
—	Used for vacated reigns so as not to count it as an official reign
+	Indicates the current reign is changing daily

#	Wrestler	Reign	Date	Days held	Location	Event	Notes	Ref(s)
1	Harry Smith	1	January 13, 2012	275	Chicago, Illinois	Rise	Defeated Kevin Steen and The Sheik in a three-way match to become the inaugural RPW Heavyweight Champion.	
—	Vacated	—	October 14, 2012	—	Chicago, Illinois	—	Smith was stripped of the title.	
2	Robert Anthony	1	October 20, 2012	399	Racine, Wisconsin	RPW/GLCW Point of Entry	Defeated Bobby Lashley and Jay Bradley in a three-way match to win the vacant RPW Heavyweight Championship.	
3	Jocephus	1	November 23, 2013	349	Williamstown, New Jersey	Caress of Steel		
4	Marshe Rockett	1	November 7, 2014	71	Lockport, Illinois	And Justice For All		
5	Scott Young	1	January 17, 2015	<1	Summit, Illinois	Animals		
6	Suge D	1	January 17, 2015	245	Summit, Illinois	Animals		
7	Da Cobra	1	September 19, 2015	294	Lockport, Illinois	Rolling Thunder		
8	Sean Mulligan	1	July 9, 2016	63	Summit, Illinois	Sabotage	This was a triple threat match also including Yabo The Clown	
9	Da Cobra	2	September 10, 2016	378	Lockport, Illinois	Exile		
10	Daniel Eads	1	September 23, 2017	<1	Summit, Illinois	FW/RPW Rumble In Summit		
11	John Skyler	1	September 23, 2017	602	Lockport, Illinois	FW/RPW Rumble In Summit		
12	Shane Mercer	1	May 18, 2019	Unknown	Summit, Illinois	Resistance Chapter VI: Death Wish		
13	Deactivated		2019		N/A		title deactivated when promotion stopped running events	

== Combined reigns ==
As of March 15, 2026.

†	Indicates the current champion

Rank	Wrestler	No. of reigns	Combined days
1	John Skyler	1	602
2	Robert Anthony	1	399
3	Da Cobra	2	378
4	Shane Mercer	1	2,493
5	Jocephus	1	349
6	Harry Smith	1	275
7	Suge D	1	245
8	Marshe Rockett	1	71
9	Sean Mulligan	1	63
10	Daniel Eads	1	<1
10	Scott Young	1	<1
