= Marshe Rockett =

American professional wrestler

Marshé Rockett
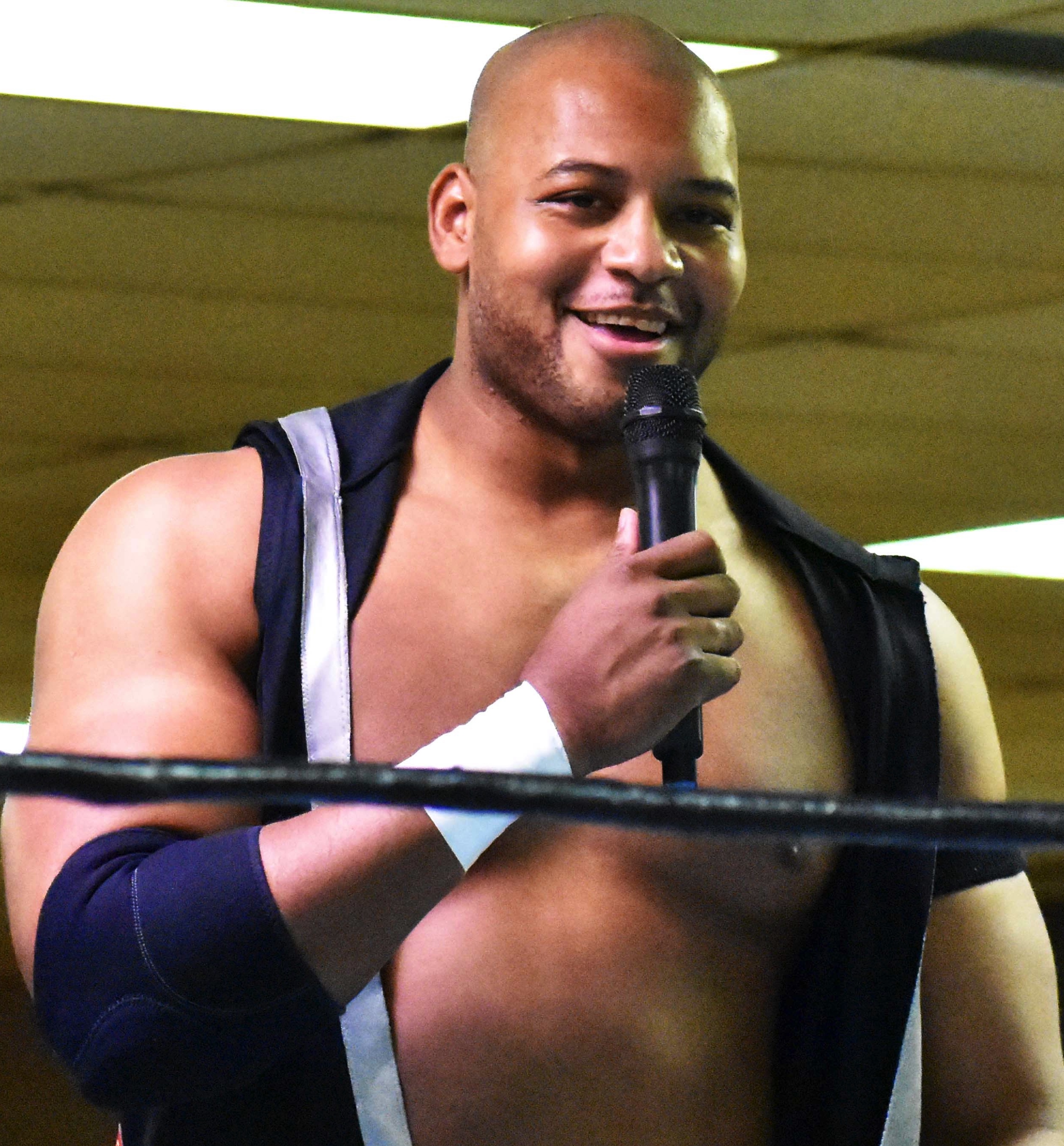
- Rockett in March 2019

Personal information
- Born: Marshé Rockett; January 5, 1985 (age 41) Normal, Illinois, U.S.

Professional wrestling career
- Ring name(s): Carnage; Marshe Rockett
- Billed height: 6 ft 4 in (193 cm)
- Billed weight: 275 lb (125 kg)
- Billed from: Chicago, Illinois; The Soul of America
- Trained by: Steve Boz; Hunter Paine; Austin Roberts; Acid Ajaz
- Debut: 2003

Marshé Rockett (born January 5, 1985) is an American professional wrestler, He is signed to the National Wrestling Alliance (NWA), where he performs under the ring name Carnage as a member of Blunt Force Trauma, and is a former NWA World Tag Team Champion. He also makes appearances on the independent circuit. He is also known for his time with Impact Wrestling.

== Professional wrestling career ==
=== Independent circuit (2006–present) ===
Rockett made his professional wrestling debut in 2005 at a Windy City Pro Wrestling event, winning the WCPW Lightweight Championship from Justin Adams. On June 24, 2006, at a Windy City Pro Wrestling event, Rockett would lose a three-way match against Abaddon and Acid Jaz for the WCPW League Title. In 2007 Rocket would go on to form the tag team Da Soul Touchaz with Willie Richardson and C. Red. As a singles wrestler and member of Da Soul Touchaz, Rockett would wrestle throughout the independent circuit, most notably for CHIKARA, IWA Mid-South, DREAMWAVE Wrestling and Resistance Pro Wrestling.

On December 1, 2012, Rockett would go on to win the DREAMWAVE Alternative Championship from Ace Martino. Rockett would hold on to the belt for 371 days before losing it to Reed Bentley on December 7, 2013.

On November 9, 2014, Rockett became RPW Heavyweight Championship, defeating Josephus and becoming RPW's fourth Heavyweight Champion.

=== Total Nonstop Action Wrestling / Impact Wrestling (2016–2017) ===
On March 24, 2016, it was announced that Rockett was one of five new signees to the Impact roster. On August 8, Rockett made his debut at TNA's One Night Only: X-Travaganza event, defeating Mandrews to qualify for a number one contender seven-man ladder match at the end of the night, losing to Braxton Sutter. Rockett made his Impact Wrestling debut on the October 6 episode, teaming with the Helms Dynasty (Andrew Everett and Trevor Lee) and losing a Team X Gold match against DJZ, Mandrews and Sutter. The following week, Rockett received an X Division Championship match, losing against DJZ. On the November 24 episode of Impact Wrestling, Rockett and the Helms Dynasty would team up once more in a Team X Gold triple threat elimination match, losing to Team Go for Broke (DJZ, Mandrews and Sutter) alongside Decay (Abyss and Crazzy Steve) and Rockstar Spud, where the winning team would receive number one contendership for the X Division Championship.

On January 6, 2017, at TNA's One Night Only: Live! event, he lost to Mahabali Shera. On January 26, at Genesis, Rockett competed in a five-way match for the X Division Championship, which was won by DJZ. On February 10, at TNA's One Night Only: Joker's Wild event, Rockett was randomly teamed with Everett and lost to the team of Eddie Edwards and Caleb Konley to qualify for the gauntlet battle royal later in the night. On the April 13 episode of Impact Wrestling, Rockett competed in a four-way match won by Andrew Everett. On the May 11 episode of Impact Wrestling, he failed to capture the Impact Grand Championship from Moose, losing in the second round. On November 1, Rockett announced on Twitter that he had departed from Impact Wrestling.

=== National Wrestling Alliance ===
==== Championship pursuits (2021–2022) ====
On the March 23, 2021, episode of NWA Powerrr, Rockett made his debut for the promotion in a three-way match to determine the number one contender to the NWA World Television Championship, which was won by Fred Rosser. On the April 20 episode of NWA Powerrr, he had another chance at the TV Title contendership in a three-way match, which was won by Tyrus. On the May 25 episode of NWA Powerrr, Rockett competed in a battle royal to determine the number one contender to the NWA Worlds Heavyweight Championship, which was won by Trevor Murdoch. On June 6, at When Our Shadows Fall, Rockett teamed with Slice Boogie in a four-way tag team match, losing to La Rebelión (Mecha Wolf and Bestia 666). On the July 13 episode of NWA PowerrrSurge, Rockett got his first televised win by defeating Jeremiah Plunkett.

The following weeks saw Rockett participate in the NWA Champions Series, being drafted to Aron Stevens and Taryn Terrell's team, and losing to Kamille and Austin Idol's Thom Latimer. On August 29, at the NWA 73rd Anniversary Show, Rockett competed in a battle royal to determine the number one contender to the NWA National Championship, which was won by Judais. On the September 7 episode of NWA Powerrr, Rockett teamed with Slice Boogie to participate in the NWA World Tag Team Championship Eliminator Tournament, but were eliminated by The Big Strong Pals (Matthew Mims and Sal Rinauro) in the first round. On the October 5 episode of NWA Powerrr, Rockett and Boogie competed in a three-way Lucha Scramble match, which was won by La Rebelión. On the December 14 episode of NWA Powerrr, Rockett was signed by BLK Jeez to join Idolmania Sports Management.

On the January 4, 2022, episode of NWA Powerrr, Rockett teamed with Jordan Clearwater to defeat Cyon in a handicap match. On the January 15 episode of NWA USA, he defeated Anthony Mayweather. On the February 8 episode of NWA Powerrr, Rockett teamed with Clearwater and Tyrus to participate in a Team War match, losing to Rodney Mack and The End (Odinson and Parrow). On the February 19 episode of NWA USA, Rockett lost a non-title bout against NWA National Champion Chris Adonis, with a title shot given to him had he won. On March 19, during night one of the Crockett Cup, Rockett teamed with Clearwater under the name "Gold Rushhh" to compete in the namesake tournament, defeating Strictly Business (Adonis and Thom Latimer) in the first round but lost to The Commonwealth Connection (Doug Williams and Harry Smith) in the quarterfinals.

The following week on NWA USA, Rockett fought Jay Bradley to determine the number one contender to the NWA National Championship, but it ended in a double disqualification. On the April 9 episode of NWA USA, Rockett teamed with NWA National Champion Jax Dane to defeat The Fixers (Bradley and Wrecking Ball Legursky), with Rockett getting the pin to gain a shot at Dane's title. Three weeks later, Rockett fought Dane for the title in a losing effort. In August, at the NWA 74th Anniversary Show, Rockett teamed with Gold Rushhh partner Clearwater to face The Country Gentlemen (AJ Cazana and Anthony Andrews) in a losing effort on the night one pre-show, and failed to capture the revived NWA United States Tag Team Championship on night two in a tag team battle royal. On the September 24 episode of NWA USA, Rockett teamed with Gold Rushhh partner Clearwater to challenge The Fixers for the NWA United States Tag Team Championship, but failed to win the titles. The following week, he competed in a tournament qualifier for the vacant NWA World Television Championship, but was eliminated by Cazana.

==== Blunt Force Trauma (2022–present) ====
On the November 30 episode of NWA Powerrr, Rockett began wearing a mask alongside Rodney Mack as "Blunt Force Trauma" (Carnage and Damage), working under Aron Stevens and defeating David Powers and Eddie Vero in a squash match. The following weeks saw Carnage participate in the NWA Champions Series under NWA Worlds Heavyweight Champion Tyrus. On the January 31, 2023, episode of NWA Powerrr, Carnage represented Team Tyrus in the Champions Series finals against Team Rock n Roll in an Ultimate Team War, eliminating Taya Valkyrie and Big Strong Mims but was eliminated by Chris Adonis. The following week, Blunt Force Trauma teamed with Tyrus and defeated Matt Cardona, Mike Knox and Rolando Freeman in a six-man tag team match. Three days later, at Nuff Said, they fought La Rebelión (Bestia 666 and Mecha Wolf) for the NWA World Tag Team Championship, losing by disqualification after Stevens hit Bestia with a loaded glove. On the May 2 episode of NWA Powerrr, Carnage was unsuccessful in beating EC3 for the NWA National Championship.

In June, during both nights of the Crockett Cup, Blunt Force Trauma competed in the namesake tournament, defeating The Outrunners (Turbo Floyd and Truth Magnum) in the second round, La Rebelión in the quarterfinals and Jinetes del Aire (Myzteziz Jr. and Octagón Jr.) in the semifinals but lost to Knox and Murdoch in the tournament final. In August, during both nights of the NWA 75th Anniversary Show, Blunt Force Trauma defeated La Rebelión to win the NWA World Tag Team Championship, and successfully defended the titles against Knox and Murdoch. On October 28, at Samhain, they retained their titles against Knox and Murdoch in a "Knight of the Round Table" tables match.

On March 2, 2024 at Hard Times 4, Blunt Force Trauma retained their titles against The Immortals (J. R. Kratos and Odinson).

== Championships and accomplishments ==
- Chicago Style Wrestling/Southland Championship Wrestling
  - CSW Heavyweight Championship (3 times, current)
  - CSW/SCW Southland Heavyweight Championship (2 times)
  - CSW Metra Division Championship (2 times)
  - SCW Tag Team Championship (1 time) - with Sean Mulligan
- Crash Tested Wrestling
  - CTW Heavyweight Championship (2 time)
  - CTW Heavyweight Title #1 Contendership (2021)
- DeathGrip Wrestling
  - King of Bourbon Street (2009)
- DREAMWAVE Wrestling
  - DREAMWAVE Alternative Championship (1 time)
  - DREAMWAVE Tag Team Championship (1 time) – with Brubaker
  - DREAMWAVE World Championship (1 time)
- Elite Pro Wrestling
  - Elite Tag Team Championship (1 time) – with Acid Jaz and Willie Richardson^{1}
- Freelance Underground
  - FU Tag Team Championship (1 time) - with Acid Jaz
- Gladiadores Aztecas de Lucha Libre Internacional
  - GALLI Tag Team Championship (8 time) – with Willie Richardson and Acid Jaz
- Global Professional Wrestling
  - GPW Battle Royal Championship (1 time)
  - GPW Championship (1 time)
- Independent Wrestling Association Mid-South
  - Candido Cup (2008) – with Acid Jaz
- Pro Wrestling Blitz
  - PWB No Limits Championship (1 time)
- Frozen Tundra Wrestling
  - FTW King In The North Heavyweight Championship (3 time, inaugural)
  - FTW King In The North Heavyweight Title Tournament (2022)
- International Wrestling Revolution Group
  - IWRG Intercontinental Tag Team Championship (1 time) – with Bryce Benjamin
- National Wrestling Alliance
  - NWA World Tag Team Championship (1 time) - with Damage
- National Wrestling Alliance Chicago
  - NWA Chicago Heavyweight Championship (1 time, current)
- Pro Wrestling Illustrated
  - Ranked No. 411 of the top 500 wrestlers in the PWI 500 in 2014
- Resistance Pro Wrestling
  - RPW Heavyweight Championship (1 time)
- Rocket Pro Wrestling
  - RPW Heavyweight Championship (1 time)
  - RPW Tag Team Championship (1 time) - with “Shogun” Chris Logan as The Final Level
- SmashMouth Pro Wrestling
  - SmashMouth Tag Team Championship (1 time) – with Acid Jaz
- Stars & Stripes Wrestling
  - SSW Heavyweight Championship (3 time)
  - SSW Lightweight Championship (1 time)
  - SSW Tag Team Championship (1 time) – with Acid Jaz, Willie Richarson, Trauma, Dymond and C. Red^{1}
- Urban American Pro Wrestling
  - UAPW Inner City Championship (1 time)
  - UAPW Tag Team Championship (1 time) – with Acid Jaz
- WAR Pro Wrestling
  - WAR Championship (1 time)
  - WAR Tag Team Championship (1 time) – with Acid Jaz
- Windy City Pro Wrestling
  - WCPW Lightweight Championship (1 time)
- Wisconsin Pro Wrestling
  - WPW Sheboygan Lakers Championship (1 time)

^{1}Da Soul Touchaz defended the title under the Freebird Rule.
