= RPW Tag Team Championship =

Professional wrestling tag team championship

Resistance Tag Team Championship

Details
- Promotion: The Resistance
- Date established: November 30, 2012
- Current champions: Timmy Lou Retton and White Mike
- Date won: December 1, 2018

Other names
- RPW Tag Team Championship (2012 - 2018); Resistance Tag Team Championship (2018 - present)
Statistics
- First champions: Aaron Epic and Suge D
- Most reigns: Jake Omen and Scotty Young (2 reigns)
- Longest reign: Timmy Lou Retton and White Mike (2661+ days)
- Shortest reign: Jay Bradley and Mad Man Pondo (<1 day)

The Resistance Tag Team Championship is a professional wrestling tag team championship currently promoted by the American promotion The Resistance. The inaugural champions were Aaron Epic and Suge D who won the titles at RPW Sad Wings Of Destiny on November 30, 2012. There have been 13 reigns and two vacancies disputed between 21 different champions. The current champions are Timmy Lou Retton and White Mike who are in their first reign.

== Title history ==
Key
No.	Overall reign number
Reign	Reign number for the specific team—reign numbers for the individuals are in parentheses, if different
Days	Number of days held
<1	Reign lasted less than a day
+	Current reign is changing daily

No.	Champion	Championship change			Reign statistics		Notes	Ref.
No.	Champion	Date	Event	Location	Reign	Days	Notes	Ref.
1	Lock Up (Aaron Epic and Suge D)	November 30, 2012	Sad Wings of Destiny	Chicago, Illinois	1	358	Defeated Jocephus & Steven Walters, The P-Dogg Millionaires (Ariya Daivari and Shawn Daivari) and Rising Sun (Lince Dorado and Samuray del Sol) in a four-way tag team match to become the inaugural champions.	
2	Da Soul Touchaz (Acid Jaz and Willie Richardson)	November 23, 2013	Caress of Steel	Williamstown, New Jersey	1	164	This was a Steel Cage match where the Special Guest referee was Kevin Nash	
3	Jocephus and Robert Anthony	May 6, 2014	Savage Amusement	Willowbrook, Illinois	1	80		
—	Vacated	July 25, 2014	The Mob Rules	Willowbrook, Illinois	—	—	The championship was vacated after Anthony suffered a legitimate injury.	
4	Eve and Jocephus (2)	July 25, 2014	The Mob Rules	Willowbrook, Illinois	1	49	Defeated Jay Bradley and Mr. 450 to win the vacant titles. Eve was the first female wrestler to have ever won the title.	
5	Jay Bradley and Mad Man Pondo	September 12, 2014	Draw The Line	Chicago, Illinois	1	<1		
—	Vacated	September 12, 2014	Draw The Line	Willowbrook, Illinois	—	—	Jay Bradley and Mad Man Pondo were stripped off the titles due to unknown circumstances.	
6	Body Magic (Brady Pierce and Eric St. Vaughn)	September 26, 2014	Practice What You Preach	Willowbrook, Illinois	1	225	Defeated BD Smooth & Hardcore Harry, Acid Jaz & Willie Richardson and Mad Man Pondo & Scotty Young in a four-way tag team match to win the vacant titles.	
7	Mad Man Pondo (2) and Shane Mercer	May 9, 2015	Delirium	Summit, Illinois	1	245		
8	Main Street Youth (Jake Omen and Scotty Young)	January 9, 2016	Resolution!	Summit, Illinois	1	119	This was a hardcore match.	
9	Corey Hollis and John Skyler	May 7, 2016	Chain Reaction	Summit, Illinois	1	182		
10	Main Street Youth (Jake Omen and Scotty Young)	November 5, 2016	Road to Ruin	Summit, Illinois	2	196	This was a Texas tornado street fight.	
11	Mojo McQueen and Yabo The Clown	May 20, 2017	Battle Of Chicago	Summit, Illinois	1	N/A	The length of this reign is uncertain, ending somewhere in the second half of 2017.	
12	Hy-Zaya and Shane Mercer (2)	2017	N/A	Summit, Illinois	1	N/A	It is unknown how and when did Hy-Zaya and Mercer win the titles. Probably at some house show, as cagematch.net is currently stating, but still it's not certain.	
13	The Gym Nasty Boyz (Timmy Lou Retton and White Mike)	December 1, 2018	Resistance Chapter IV: Silent Night, Deadly Night	Summit, Illinois	1	2661+	This was a 2-on-1 handicap match in which Mercer defended the titles alone due to Hy-Zaya not showing up for the match.	

== Combined reigns ==
As of March 15, 2026.

=== By team ===
†	Indicates the current champion

Rank	Team	No. of reigns	Combined days
1	The Gym Nasty Boyz † (Timmy Lou Retton and White Mike)	1	2661+
2	Lock Up (Aaron Epic and Suge D)	1	358
3	Main Street Youth (Jake Omen and Scotty Young)	2	315
4	Mad Man Pondo and Shane Mercer	1	245
5	Body Magic (Brady Pierce and Eric St. Vaughn)	1	225
6	Corey Hollis and John Skyler	1	182
7	Da Soul Touchaz (Acid Jaz and Willie Richardson)	1	164
8	Jocephus and Robert Anthony	1	80
9	Eve and Jocephus	1	49
10	Jay Bradley and Mad Man Pondo	1	<1
11	Hy-Zaya and Shane Mercer	1	N/A¤
11	Mojo McQueen and Yabo The Clown	1	N/A¤

=== By wrestler ===
Rank	Wrestler	No. of reigns	Combined days
1	Timmy Lou Retton †	1	2661+
1	White Mike †	1	2661+
3	Aaron Epic	1	358
3	Suge D	1	358
5	Jake Omen	2	315
5	Scotty Young	2	315
7	Mad Man Pondo	2	245
7	Shane Mercer	2	245
9	Brady Pierce	1	225
9	Eric St. Vaughn	1	225
11	Corey Hollis	1	182
11	John Skyler	1	182
13	Acid Jaz	1	164
13	Willie Richardson	1	164
15	Jocephus	2	129
16	Robert Anthony	1	80
17	Eve	1	49
18	Jay Bradley	1	<1
19	Hy-Zaya	1	N/A¤
19	Mojo McQueen	1	N/A¤
19	Yabo The Clown	1	N/A¤
