= Jocephus =

American professional wrestler (1977–2021)

Personal information
- Born: Joseph Hadley Hudson; July 1, 1977 Nashville, Tennessee, U.S.
- Died: February 24, 2021 (aged 43) Nashville, Tennessee, U.S.
- Cause of death: Congenital heart defect

Professional wrestling career
- Ring names: Jocephus; Jocephus Brody; Beauregard; Question Mark
- Billed height: 6 ft 3 in (191 cm)
- Billed weight: 279 lb (127 kg)
- Debut: January 9, 2010

Joseph Hadley Hudson (July 1, 1977 – February 24, 2021), known by the ring names Jocephus and Jocephus Brody, was an American professional wrestler. He was best known for his tenures in the National Wrestling Alliance (NWA), where he later wrestled as the Question Mark.

== Professional wrestling career ==
Jocephus began his wrestling career in 2010. In the same year, he won his first title, the USWO Heavyweight Championship, a title in which he would win at least four times.

In 2012, Jocephus began wrestling in Resistance Pro. On November 23, 2013, he defeated Robert Anthony to win the RPW Heavyweight Championship. On May 16, 2014, Anthony and Jocephus defeated Da Soul Touchaz (Acid Jaz & Willie Richardson) to win the RPW Tag Team Championship. He would also win the NWA Southern Heavyweight Championship twice around this time.

In 2018, the NWA briefly allied with Impact Wrestling, the former TNA, to hold an Empty Arena match at Universal Orlando in Orlando, Florida. It was contested by Tim Storm and Jocephus and served as a qualifier to challenge then-NWA World Heavyweight Champion Nick Aldis. The match was recorded on January 14, 2018, in which Jocephus defeated Storm. On April 27, 2019, at the Crockett Cup, Jocephus teamed up with Jay Bradley, losing a seven-team battle royal to the Wildcards (Royce Isaacs & Thom Latimer) with the winner qualifying as the last entrant for the Crockett Cup tournament. By October, Hudson began wrestling under the new ring name the Question Mark.

== Personal life and death ==
Hudson had been previously married to fellow wrestler Abriella Of Amazonia, who also wrestled as Eve. He is survived by his son. Hudson died on February 24, 2021. On June 7, Aldis revealed that Hudson's cause of death was congenital heart defect.

== Championships and accomplishments ==
- NWA Southern All-Star Wrestling
  - NWA Southern Heavyweight Championship (2 times)
  - SAW Tag Team Championship (2 times) – with Jeff Daniels
- Pro Wrestling Illustrated
  - Ranked No. 302 of the top 500 singles wrestlers in the PWI 500 in 2014
- Resistance Pro Wrestling
  - RPW Heavyweight Championship (1 time)
  - RPW Tag Team Championship (2 times) – with Robert Anthony (1) and Eve (1)
- United States Wrestling Organization
  - USWO Heavyweight Championship (4 times)

=== Luchas de Apuestas record ===
Winner (wager)	Loser (wager)	Location	Event	Date	Notes
David Arquette and Tim Storm (Arquette's hair)	Jocephus and his Spiritual Advisor (Jocephus' hair)	Clarksville, Tennessee	NWA New Years Clash	January 5, 2019	

== See also ==
- List of premature professional wrestling deaths
