= Chikara (professional wrestling) =

Professional wrestling promotion

- Founded: 2002; 24 years ago
- Defunct: 2020; 6 years ago
- Style: Professional wrestling; Lucha libre; Sports entertainment
- Headquarters: Philadelphia, Pennsylvania
- Founders: Mike Quackenbush; Reckless Youth
- Owners: Mike Quackenbush and Reckless Youth (2002); Mike Quackenbush (2002–2020)
- Sister: Kiryoku Pro (2002–2003); Wrestling is Fun! (2011–2020)
- Successor: Camp Leapfrog; Power Pro Lucha
- Website: Official website

Chikara (stylized in all capital letters and sometimes referred to as Chikara Pro) was an American professional wrestling promotion based in Philadelphia, Pennsylvania. The company took both its name and logo from the Japanese kanji meaning 'strength' (力). It was founded in 2002 by professional wrestlers Mike Quackenbush and Reckless Youth, who also served as trainers and in-ring performers.

The promotion held multiple live events per month, with the majority taking place at the Chikara Wrestle Factory school. Two of their major events, September's King of Trios, the promotion's premiere event, and April's Tag World Grand Prix were centered on tag team and trios matches. Their other major events included Aniversario, held in May, and the Young Lions Cup tournament, held between June and August. In 2011, Chikara introduced the Grand Championship, the promotion's primary singles championship.

Influenced by the lucha libre tradition, Chikara performers were grouped into técnicos and rudos (the lucha libre terms for faces and heels respectively). Just as in lucha libre, many performers in the promotion performed under masks and with unique gimmicks.

The promotion closed in June 2020, after several allegations of abuse and sexual misconduct were made against individuals within it during the Speaking Out movement.

Despite the promotion's closure, the Wrestle Factory school continues to operate in Allentown, Pennsylvania.

== History ==
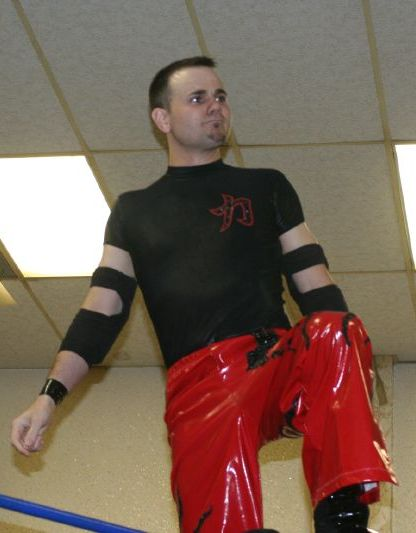
Mike Quackenbush, one of the founders and the trainer until the promotion's closure

In the summer of 2000, after "Reckless Youth" Tom Carter had been released from his World Wrestling Federation developmental deal, he, Mike Quackenbush and Don Montoya started talking about starting a wrestling school, which would teach professional wrestling in various international styles. Originally, the school was to be called "Impact Wrestling" (not to be confused with the later promotion of the same name), but when Montoya decided not to put up money for its foundation and left the project, Carter and Quackenbush decided they needed a new name. The Wrestle Factory was founded by Carter and Quackenbush in Allentown, Pennsylvania on January 7, 2002. The first class included UltraMantis, Mister Zero, Dragonfly, Hallowicked, and Ichabod Slayne. In May of the same year, Chikara expanded into a wrestling promotion with the intent of showcasing its students. The first show on May 25, 2002, featured not only the Wrestle Factory students and head trainers, but several other independent wrestlers, including Don Montoya, CM Punk, Colt Cabana, Chris Hero, Love Bug, Marshal Law, and Blind Rage. The main event of the first show featured Quackenbush and Youth joined by Don Montoya as the Black T-shirt Squad defeat the Gold Bond Mafia of Chris Hero, CM Punk, and Colt Cabana. In the early days, Blind Rage, Hallowicked, and Ichabod Slayne formed a stable known as the Night Shift, which became the top group of rudos (or heels) in the promotion. They frequently feuded with tecnicos (faces) Quackenbush, Youth, and UltraMantis. Notable events of 2002 included an appearance by former World Championship Wrestling star La Parka, who joined Mister Zero against Quackenbush and Youth, and the opening of the short-lived sister promotion Kiryoku Pro, which highlighted female wrestling.

2002 was also marked by a lawsuit against Chikara for promoting shows at the Wrestle Factory. Neighborhood activists claimed that the building was not properly zoned for assembly, and that the shows detracted from the "complexion of the community". It was eventually ruled that Chikara provided inadequate parking for their shows, and would not be allowed to promote out of the Wrestle Factory any longer. This deterred Chikara from holding any more shows until October. During the Chikara hiatus, they released tapes of their early shows, titled "The Renaissance Dawns" and "Baila, Parka, Baila", and the wrestlers worked showcase matches in other promotions, such as IWA Mid-South. Chikara soon reached an agreement with St. John's Lutheran Church in Allentown to hold shows there, only eight blocks from the Wrestle Factory. Chikara also began a second Wrestle Factory class, but lost trainer Reckless Youth at the beginning of the class, as he left the wrestling business. The first show in St. John's saw the Wildcards (Eddie Kingston and BlackJack Marciano), Gran Akuma, D. J. Skittlez, Melvin Snodgrass and Lester Crabtree debut, and shortly after, they were joined by Wrestle Factory graduates Jigsaw and Bryce Remsburg. Soon after Chikara debuted the Young Lions Cup tournament, a concept still used by the promotion. Commonly abbreviated as the YLC, the tournament was designed to showcase the best of the Wrestle Factory graduates. Hallowicked defeated Mister Zero to win the inaugural tournament, becoming the first-ever Young Lions Cup Champion in the process. In December 2002, Chikara took a two-week break during Christmastime before returning in 2003, establishing a tradition of "seasons" that they maintain today.

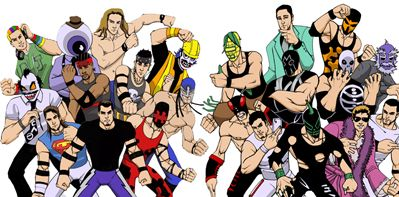
The Chikara roster of 2004

In 2004, Chris Hero became a co-trainer at the Chikara Wrestle Factory, replacing Carter. In 2005, Jorge "Skayde" Rivera joined as the third trainer. In March 2005, the school moved from Allentown to the New Alhambra Arena, in Philadelphia. They then took over the training for Combat Zone Wrestling, leading to the school's new name of CZW/Chikara Wrestle Factory. After the schools split in 2007, the training center became once again simply known as the Chikara Wrestle Factory. In 2007, Claudio Castagnoli took over Chris Hero's training duties.

On March 2, 2008, Chikara drew their biggest crowd ever of over 550 people during the King of Trios finals. That record was broken on January 31, 2010, when their first show of season nine, A Touch of Class, drew over 600 fans. Later that year, on July 25, the record was broken once again at Chikarasaurus Rex: King of Show, which drew 755 fans. The show was released by Smart Mark Video on DVD less than 24 hours after its conclusion.

On April 26, 2009, Chikara announced a working agreement with Dragon Gate USA, which saw Chikara wrestlers take part in Dragon Gate USA events. Throughout the years, Chikara has also worked with several Japanese promotions in bringing their talent over to the United States, including Dragon Gate, Ice Ribbon, JWP Joshi Puroresu, and Sendai Girls' Pro Wrestling. In 2010, Chikara established a close working relationship with the Osaka Pro Wrestling promotion. In December 2011, Chikara partnered with numerous Japanese promotion to hold the three-day-long JoshiMania event, which featured some of the biggest names in joshi puroresu. Wrestlers such as Aja Kong, Dick Togo, The Great Sasuke, Jinsei Shinzaki, Kana, Kaori Yoneyama, Kota Ibushi, Manami Toyota, and Mayumi Ozaki have made rare American appearances for Chikara.

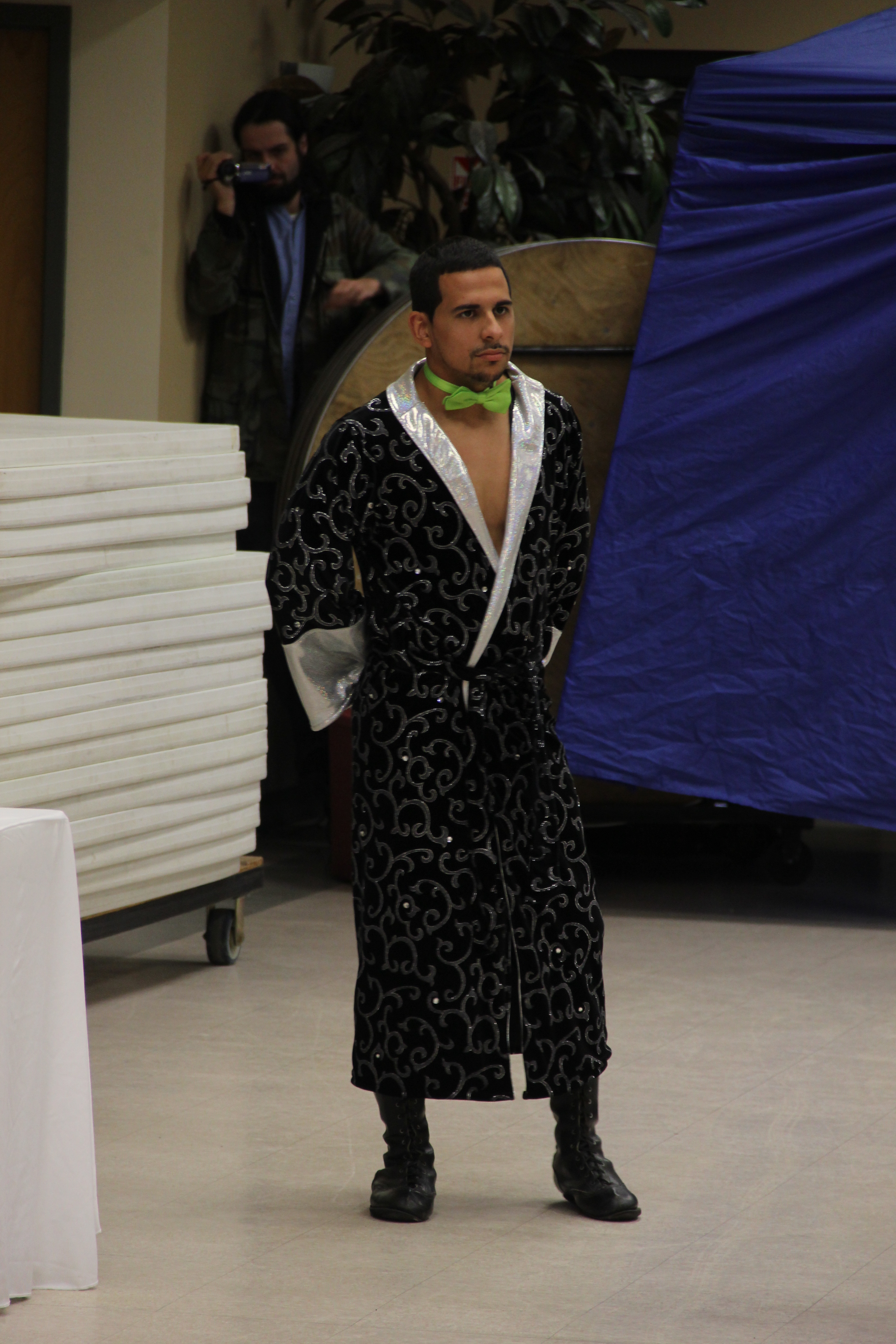
Juan Francisco de Coronado, a former Grand Champion and trainer

On April 25, 2010, Chikara announced the release of a video game, titled Rudo Resurrection, for multiple gaming platforms later in the year. After not being heard of again for four years, it was announced on May 2, 2014, that a new developer, Rotary Games, had picked up the rights to the game.

On August 1, 2011, Chikara announced that their first ever live Internet pay-per-view (iPPV), titled High Noon, would take place November 13, 2011, and would feature the crowning of the first ever Chikara Grand Champion. The event would again break Chikara's attendance record, drawing 864 fans. During 2012, High Noon was followed by the Chikarasaurus Rex: How to Hatch a Dinosaur and Under the Hood Internet pay-per-views.

In February 2012, Chikara launched their first ever web comic, written by Joey Esposito and drawn by Alex Cormack, telling the secret origin of Frightmare. On April 6, 2013, Chikara took part in WrestleCon, held during the WrestleMania 29 weekend in Secaucus, New Jersey, holding an event, which again broke the promotion's attendance record.

On June 2, 2013, Chikara ran an angle at the conclusion of their fourth iPPV, Aniversario: Never Compromise, where the event was shut down by Director of Fun Wink Vavasseur. Following the event, Chikara went inactive, "canceling" all upcoming events, though in reality these events were never scheduled to take place. Chikara held no official events for the rest of 2013, though wrestlers from the promotion did hold a small event on November 2 in Philadelphia's FDR Skatepark with the storyline that they were trying to revive the promotion. In October 2013, Viz Media acquired rights to 26 Chikara events, which would start airing on their Neon Alley digital service on Sundays as part of the new fall lineup. On February 1, 2014, it was announced that Chikara would be returning on May 25. On February 10, 2014, it was announced that The Wrestle Factory would start a new training class at the 2300 Arena on March 1.

In April 2015, Chikara made its debut in the United Kingdom with a four-show tour held across England and Wales and launched Chikaratopia, a streaming service featuring past events. That same year on July 29, the promotion launched a new weekly program, entitled Journey Into Chikara, which would air live on both Chikaratopia and YouTube. In December 2016, Chikara concluded its 16th season. However, when the promotion returned in February 2017, it was announced as the start of season 18. Season 17 had been taped during the break and would be streamed on Chikaratopia.

On August 7, 2019, Chikara announced a working relationship with Michinoku Pro Wrestling.

On June 24, 2020, Quackenbush announced Chikara was shutting down amid allegations of misconduct within the company.

== Chikara Wrestle Factory ==
On January 7, 2002, "Reckless Youth" Tom Carter and Mike Quackenbush founded the Chikara Wrestle Factory, a wrestling school based in Allentown, Pennsylvania. Following the start of the Wrestle Factory's second class, Carter departed from Chikara and ultimately left the wrestling industry. In 2004, Chris Hero became a co-trainer at the Wrestle Factory, filling the vacancy left by Carter's departure. In 2005, Mexican luchador Jorge "Skayde" Rivera became the school's third trainer. In March 2005, the school moved from Allentown to the New Alhambra Arena, in Philadelphia. In 2007, Chris Hero left Chikara and the Wrestle Factory, with Claudio Castagnoli taking over Hero's training duties. In August 2011, Castagnoli signed with WWE, and departed the Wrestle Factory. Former guest instructors included El Pantera, Terry Funk, CM Punk, Marty Jannetty, and many others.

At the time of June 2020, head trainer Mike Quackenbush was assisted by trainers Orange Cassidy (the former Fire Ant), Hallowicked, and Ophidian. As of now, training to prospective professional wrestlers, managers, valets, and referees in Northeastern Philadelphia, Pennsylvania is offered in all styles of pro wrestling, including lucha libre, puroresu, Lancashire, and catch, among others.

At the end of 2022, The Wrestle Factory moved to a new location in Allentown.

== Championships ==
Championship	Final champion(s)	Previous champion(s)	Date won	Days held	Location
Chikara Grand Championship	Dasher Hatfield	"Mr. Touchdown" Mark Angelosetti	April 5, 2019	446	Jersey City, New Jersey
Chikara Campeonatos de Parejas	The Bird and The Bee (Solo Darling and Willow Nightingale)	F.I.S.T. (Tony Deppen and Travis Huckabee)	November 9, 2019	228	Philadelphia, Pennsylvania
Chikara Young Lions Cup	Ricky South	Still Life with Apricots and Pears	January 18, 2020	158	Philadelphia, Pennsylvania

=== Other accomplishments ===
Accomplishment	Last winner(s)	Date won
King of Trios	The Crucible (Ophidian, Princess KimberLee, and Lance Steel)	October 6, 2019
Rey de Voladores	The Whisper	October 6, 2019
Tag World Grand Prix	The Throwbacks (Dasher Hatfield and "Mr. Touchdown" Mark Angelosetti)	April 14, 2018
Torneo Cibernetico	The Whisper	June 20, 2020
Infinite Gauntlet	Ophidian	May 11, 2019
The Johnny Kidd Invitational	Ophidian	September 7, 2019

== Notable alumni ==
- 1-2-3 Kid / Sean Waltman / X-Pac
- 2 Cold Scorpio
- A. C. H.
- Acid Jaz
- Aero Star
- El Alebrije
- Cedric Alexander
- Bryan Alvarez
- Amasis
- Amazing Kong
- Amazing Red
- Josh Abercrombie / Josh Raymond
- Mark Andrews
- Mark Angelosetti
- Ares
- Austin Aries
- Atlantis
- Ax
- B-Boy
- The Barbarian
- Tyler Bate
- Mike Bennett
- Big Stevie Cool
- Sinn Bodhi
- Chris Bosh
- Max Boyer / Maxime Boyer
- Brad Bradley
- Brain Damage
- Harlem Bravado
- Lancelot Bravado
- Jay Briscoe
- Mark Briscoe
- D'Lo Brown
- Bull Pain
- BxB Hulk
- C. Red
- Colt Cabana / Matt Classic
- Call-Me-Kevin
- Sami Callihan
- Arik Cannon
- Carpenter Ant
- Claudio Castagnoli / Cesaro
- Chimaera
- Dash Chisako
- Chiva IV / Chiva Kid
- Tommaso Ciampa
- Cima
- CM Punk
- Adam Cole
- Danny Boy Collins
- Command Bolshoi
- Jervis Cottonbelly
- Matt Cross
- Da Blue Guy
- Allison Danger
- Christopher Daniels / Curry Man
- Danny Daniels
- Bryan Danielson
- KC Day / Cloudy
- Sara Del Rey
- Colin Delaney / Colin Olsen
- Delirious
- Chris Dickinson
- J. J. Dillon
- DJ Hyde / Mano Metalico
- Naruki Doi
- Tim Donst
- Lince Dorado
- Drago
- Ryan Drago / Simon Grimm
- Tommy Dreamer
- Pete Dunne
- Dustin / Chuck Taylor
- Sonjay Dutt
- Dymond
- Madison Eagles
- Robbie Eagles
- Ebessan (I) / Kikutaro
- Eddie Edwards
- Egotistico Fantastico
- Robbie Ellis
- Tommy End
- Escorpion Egipcio
- Excalibur
- Fénix
- Orange Cassidy / Fire Ant
- Jody Fleisch
- A. R. Fox
- Terry Frazier
- Frightmare
- Tsukasa Fujimoto
- Gangrel
- Johnny Gargano
- El Generico
- Vin Gerard / Equinox
- Glacier
- Gran Akuma
- The Great Sanada
- The Great Sasuke
- Green Ant (I) / Silver Ant
- Green Ant (II)
- Jonathan Gresham / Hieracon
- Chavo Guerrero Jr.
- Drew Gulak / Soldier Ant
- Billy Gunn
- Dasher Hatfield
- Hailey Hatred
- Hallowicked
- Ayako Hamada
- Daisuke Harada
- Daizee Haze
- Helios / Ricochet
- Cheech Hernandez / Cheech
- Hernandez
- Chris Hero
- Hollywood Nova / Simon Dean
- Homicide
- Hydra
- Princess Kimber Lee
- Kid Lykos
- Kota Ibushi
- Icarus
- Incognito
- Greg Iron
- Ryuji Ito
- Matt Jackson
- Nick Jackson
- Jimmy Jacobs
- Jagged / Scott Parker
- Mickie James
- Marty Jannetty
- Jazz
- Jigsaw
- Johnny
- Joker / Colt Cabunny
- Kagetora
- Kana
- Maria Kanellis
- Manami Katsu
- Kenny
- Johnny Kidd
- Eddie Kingston
- Mickie Knuckles
- Kodama
- Aja Kong
- Atsushi Kotoge
- Kudo
- Tsubasa Kuragaki
- Yujiro Kushida
- La Parka
- La Parkita
- Brodie Lee
- Trevor Lee
- Candice LeRae
- Jay Lethal
- Jushin Thunder Liger
- Scott Lost
- Heidi Lovelace
- Jerry Lynn
- Mad Man Pondo
- Magno
- Makoto
- Mercedes Martinez
- Mascarita Dorada
- Shane Matthews
- Joel Maximo
- Jose Maximo
- Wil Maximo
- m.c. KZ
- Jessie McKay
- Meng
- Mikey
- Milanito Collection a.t.
- Milano Collection A.T.
- Miyawaki
- Masaaki Mochizuki
- Aldo Montoya
- Jon Moxley
- Necro Butcher / CP Munk
- Osamu Nishimura
- Shinjitsu Nohashi
- Amber O'Neal
- Kyle O'Reilly
- Yuji Okabayashi
- Kazuchika Okada
- Jimmy Olsen / Equinox (II)
- One Man Gang
- Ophidian
- El Oriental
- Chase Owens
- Mayumi Ozaki
- Pac
- El Pantera
- Archibald Peck / Mixed Martial Archie / The Mysterious and Handsome Stranger / The Latvian Proud Oak
- Portia Perez
- Pierrothito
- Player Dos / Stupefied
- Player Uno
- Psycho
- Mike Quackenbush
- Rain
- Reckless Youth
- Joel Redman
- Ashley Remington
- Rey Bucanero
- Willie Richardson
- Matt Riddle
- Jorge Rivera
- Marshe Rockett
- Rockstar Spud
- Romeo Roselli
- Ian Rotten
- Ruckus
- Joey Ryan
- Sabian
- Chris Sabin
- Zack Sabre Jr.
- Sendai Sachiko
- Raisha Saeed
- Johnny Saint
- Sumie Sakai
- Sha Samuels
- Tito Santana
- Sassy Stephie
- Meiko Satomura
- Daisuke Sekimoto
- Trent Seven
- SeXXXy Eddy
- Shark Girl
- Alex Shelley
- Mototsugu Shimizu
- Mima Shimoda
- Shingo
- Jinsei Shinzaki
- Mio Shirai
- Emil Sitoci
- Smash
- Al Snow
- Kevin Steen
- Martin Stone
- Jonny Storm
- Shane Storm / Stigma
- AJ Styles
- Super Dragon
- Super Shisa
- Rich Swann
- Larry Sweeney
- Matt Sydal
- Tadasuke
- Tatanka
- Dave Taylor
- Thief Ant
- Antonio Thomas
- Tigre Uno
- Rhett Titus
- Dick Togo
- Tank Toland
- Manami Toyota
- Akira Tozawa
- Trauma
- Toshie Uematsu
- Ultramantis / UltraMantis Black
- Victoria
- The Warlord
- Worker Ant (I)
- Worker Ant (II)
- Shiima Xion
- Yamamoto
- Keita Yano
- Kaori Yoneyama
- Masato Yoshino
- Drake Younger

== Commercial DVD releases ==
Big Vision Entertainment releases

Name	Release date	Region	Additional information
Best of Chikara	November 6, 2007	Global	Contains 9 matches from 2005 and 2006.

== See also ==
- List of independent wrestling promotions in the United States
