= Shane Mercer =

American male professional wrestler (born 1988)

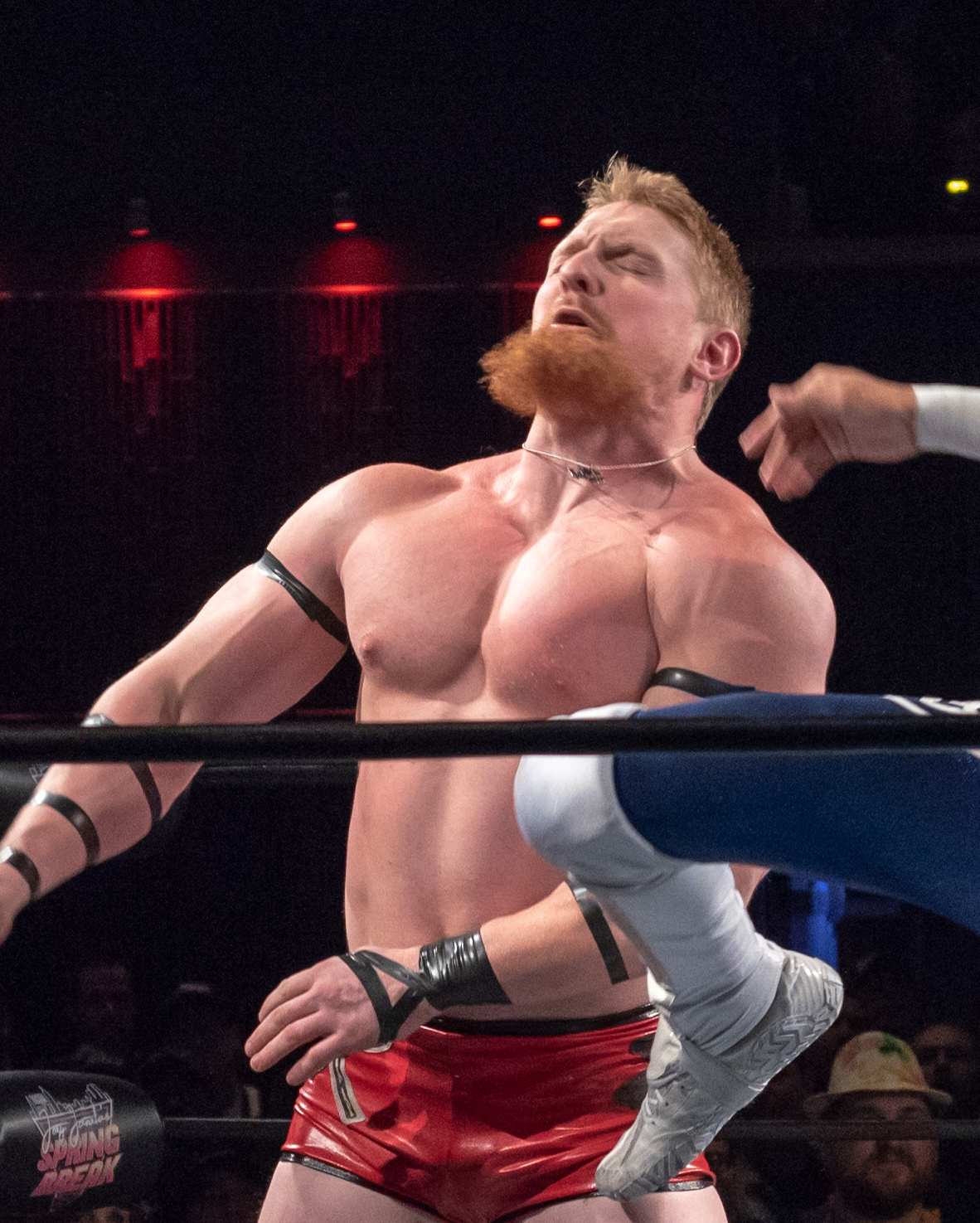
- Mercer in April 2019

Personal information
- Born: 5 June 1988 (age 38) Lexington, Kentucky, United States

Professional wrestling career
- Ring name: Diablo Riley Apex The Samurai Shane Goode Shane Mercer Shangel Creed
- Billed height: 181 cm (5 ft 11 in)
- Billed weight: 95 kg (209 lb)
- Debut: 2008

Timothy Shane Goode (born June 5, 1988) better known by his ring name Shane Mercer, is an American professional wrestler and promoter. He currently performs on the independent circuit, primarily with Juggalo Championship Wrestling (JCW) and Game Changer Wrestling (GCW). He is also the owner of the Xtreme Championship Federation (XCF) promotion.

== Professional wrestling career ==
=== American independent circuit (2008–present) ===
At Major League Wrestling's Battle Riot VI from June 1, 2024, Goode competed in the traditional 40-man Battle Riot match for a future MLW World Heavyweight Championship match, bout won by Matt Riddle and also involving notable opponents such as Bobby Fish, Tom Lawlor, Davey Boy Smith Jr. and Sami Callihan.

=== IWA Mid-South (2008–2021) ===
Goode shared a thirteen-year tenure with IWA Mid-South. He made his very professional wrestling debut in the promotion at IWA Mid-South Tryout Show, a house show held on October 26, 2008, where he wrestled under the name of "Shangel Creed" and fell short to Corey Havic in singles competition. He is a former one-time IWA Mid-South Heavyweight Champion and a former IWA Mid-South Tag Team Champion, title which he won alongside Calvin Tankman.

During his time with the promotion, he competed in several signature events. In the Ted Petty Invitational tournament, he made his first appearance at the 2015 edition in which he emerged as the runner-up to Kongo Kong and Chris Hero in the finals which were also disputed for the IWA Mid-South Heavyweight Championship. In the IWA Mid-South King of the Deathmatch, he made his first appearance at the 2020 edition where he fell to John Wayne Murdoch in the first rounds.

=== Game Changer Wrestling (2019–present) ===
Goode made his debut in Game Changer Wrestling at GCW 400 Degreez on January 12, 2019, where he won a seven-way scramble also involving Aeroboy, Bandolero, Gringo Loco, Isaias Velazquez, KTB and Tony Deppen.

He competed in various of the promotion's signature events. In the Joey Janela's Spring Break series, he made his first appearance at Spring Break 3 on April 7, 2019, where he competed in the traditional Clusterfuck Battle Royal, bout which ended in a no contest and involved notable opponents such as Joey Ryan, JTG, nWo Sting, Swoggle and others. At The Wrld on GCW on January 23, 2022, he competed in a Pabst Blue Ribbon Kickoff Scramble match won by Grim Reefer and also involving Alex Zayne, Dante Leon, Jack Cartwheel, and Ninja Mack. On the first night of the GCW Fight Club from October 8, 2022, he competed in a six-way scramble won by Lio Rush and also involving Blake Christian, Gringo Loco, Jimmy Lloyd and B-Boy. One night later, he competed in the same type of bout, won again by Rush and also involving Sawyer Wreck, Alec Price, Axton Ray, and Dustin Waller. In the GCW Bloodsport series, he made his first appearance at Bloodsport 6 on April 8, 2021, where he fell short to Chris Dickinson.

During his time with the promotion, Goode chased for various accomplishments. At GCW The People Vs. GCW on July 29, 2022, he competed in a six-way scramble for the GCW Extreme Championship won by Cole Radrick and also involving AJ Gray, Axton Ray, Grim Reefer and Marko Stunt. At GCW The Art Of War 2022 on September 3, Goode competed in a Ladder match contester for DDT Pro-Wrestling's DDT Extreme Championship won by Joey Janela and also involving Cole Radrick, Dante Leon and Drago Kid, Gringo Loco, Mike Bailey and Tony Deppen. At GCW Cage Of Survival 3 on June 2, 2024, Mercer competed in a Gauntlet of Survival match disputed for the vacant GCW World Championship, bout won by Nick Gage and also involving John Wayne Murdoch, Kasey Catal, 1 Called Manders, Microman, Jordan Oliver, and Charles Mason.

== Other media ==
Goode appears as a playable character in The Wrestling Code, a professional wrestling video game developed by Virtual Basement. He is also one of the featured athletes in the children's book Good Night Ninja, which highlights independent wrestlers and their personas.

On December 3, 2018, Sports Illustrated featured Goode in an article after footage of him lifting and swinging an entire section of metal bleachers during a match at The Resistance went viral.

== Championships and accomplishments ==
- Evolution Pro Wrestling
  - EPW Openweight Championship (1 time)
- Freelance Underground
  - FU Heavyweight Championship (1 time, current)
- Freelance Wrestling
  - Freelance World Tag Team Championship (1 time) – with Calvin Tankman
- Hooligan Championship Wrestling
  - HCW Heavyweight Championship (1 time)
- IWA Mid-South
  - IWA Mid-South Heavyweight Championship (1 time)
  - IWA Mid-South Tag Team Championship (1 time) – with Dakota Bostock
- Juggalo Championship Wrestling
  - JCW Heavyweight Championship (1 time)
  - JCW Tag Team Championship (1 time) – with Colby Corino
- Pro Wrestling Illustrated
  - Ranked No. 321 of the top 500 singles wrestlers in the PWI 500 in 2020
- Resistance Pro Wrestling
  - RPW Heavyweight Championship (1 time, final)
  - RPW Tag Team Championship (2 times) – with Mad Man Pondo (1) and Hy-Zaya (1)
- Strong Style Wrestling
  - SSW Heavyweight Championship (1 time)
- Wrestling Theology Fellowship
  - WTF Belt Of Truth Championship (1 time)
