= Da Soul Touchaz =

Professional wrestling stable

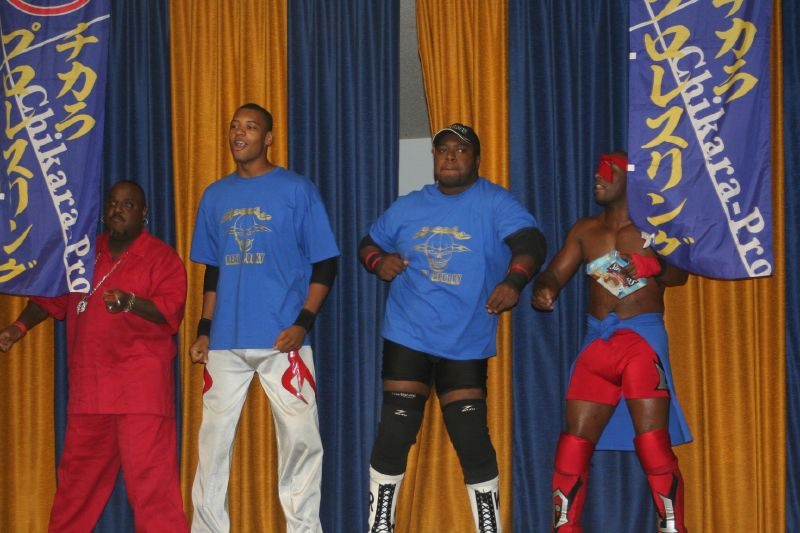
- (From left to right) C. Red, Marshe Rockett, Willie Richardson and Acid Jaz in June 2008

Statistics
- Members: Acid Jaz; Marshe Rockett; Willie Richardson; C. Red (manager)
- Name(s): Da Soul Touchaz; The Soul Touchaz
- Billed heights: C. Red: 5 ft 9 in (1.75 m); Dymond: 5 ft 6 in (1.68 m); Jaz: 5 ft 9 in (1.75 m); Richardson: 6 ft 2 in (1.88 m); Rockett: 6 ft 4 in (1.93 m); Trauma: 5 ft 10 in (1.78 m)
- Combined billed weight: C. Red: 200 lb (91 kg); Dymond: 130 lb (59 kg); Jaz: 187 lb (85 kg); Richardson: 250 lb (110 kg); Rockett: 215 lb (98 kg); Trauma: 273 lb (124 kg)
- Billed from: The Soul of America
- Former members: Dymond (valet); Trauma

Da Soul Touchaz is a professional wrestling alliance, currently consisting of American professional wrestlers Acid Jaz, Marshe Rockett, Willie Richardson and manager C. Red. The group is best known for working for Chikara, but has also worked for promotions such as Dragon Gate USA, Independent Wrestling Association Mid-South and various other independent promotions.

Originally forming on the independent circuit in the Illinois–area, the group has worked majority of its existence as babyface and has had its members hold numerous titles in promotions such as Stars & Stripes Wrestling, Vanguard Wrestling All–Star Alliance and Windy City Pro Wrestling. A major part of the group's gimmick involves its entrance, during which its members are known for doing the "Soulja Boy dance" from "Crank That (Soulja Boy)", which was also their entrance theme.

== History ==
=== Chikara (2008–2013) ===
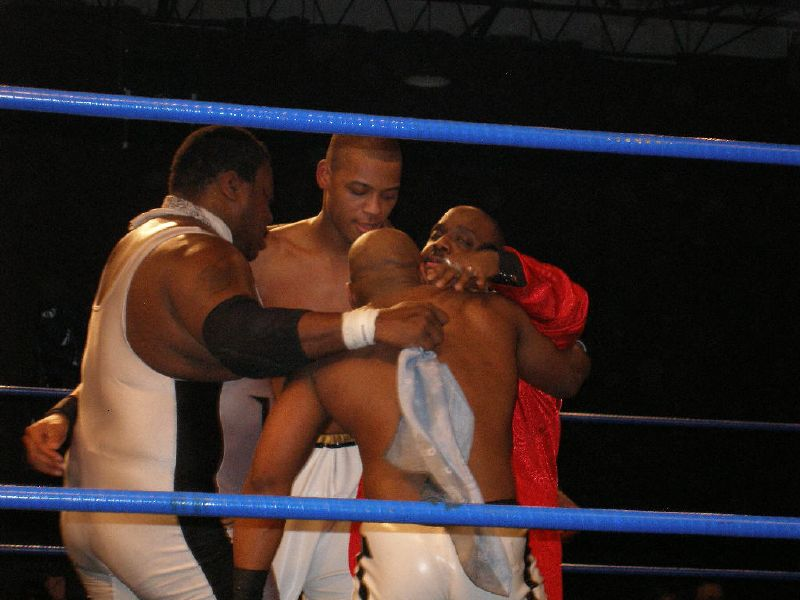
Da Soul Touchaz before a match in March 2008

After their formation on the Illinois–independent circuit, Da Soul Touchaz, being represented by Acid Jaz, Marshe Rockett, Willie Richardson and their manager C. Red, made their debut for Philadelphia, Pennsylvania–based Chikara on March 1, 2008, entering the 2008 King of Trios tournament. After defeating Team BSE (Kobra Kai, La Sombra Canadiense and Super Xtremo) in the first round, they were eliminated from the tournament later that same day by F.I.S.T. (Chuck Taylor, Gran Akuma and Icarus). The group returned to Chikara in June 2008, with Marshe Rockett entering the sixth Young Lions Cup tournament, while Acid Jaz and Willie Richardson wrestled tag team matches. On July 14 Rockett defeated Johnny Gargano in his first round match, thus advancing to the six–way elimination semifinal match later that same day, from which he was eliminated by Lince Dorado. Trauma made his Chikara debut on September 20, 2008, in an eight-man tag team match, where he, Jaz, Richardson and Rockett defeated UltraMantis Black, Crossbones, Sami Callihan and Trik Davis.

Da Soul Touchaz returned to Chikara on March 27, 2009, with Marshe Rockett, Willie Richardson and Trauma, who replaced an injured Acid Jaz, entering the 2009 King of Trios tournament. This appearance also marked the Chikara debut of their valet Dymond. In their first round match Richardson, Rockett and Trauma defeated Team CZW (Beef Wellington, Greg Excellent and Pinkie Sanchez). The following day they were eliminated from the tournament in the quarterfinals by The UnStable (Colin Delaney, STIGMA and Vin Gerard). On the third day of the tournament Richardson and Rockett entered a twelve tag team gauntlet match and eliminated Mitch Ryder and Pinkie Sanchez, before being eliminated themselves by The Young Bucks (Matt and Nick Jackson).

After not appearing for Chikara for the rest of the year, Da Soul Touchaz attempted to win a spot in the 2010 King of Trios tournament by entering Cleveland, Ohio–based Absolute Intense Wrestling's (AIW) sixteen team Jack of All Trios tournament in April 2010, the winner of which would earn themselves a spot in King of Trios. Acid Jaz, Marshe Rockett and Willie Richardson made it all the way to the semifinals of the tournament, before suffering an upset loss against the trio of Johnny Gargano, Flip Kendrick and Louis Lyndon, who went on to win the entire tournament. After missing the 2010 King of Trios, Jaz, Richardson and Rockett, managed by C. Red and Dymond, returned to Chikara on June 26, 2010, defeating the reigning King of Trios, the up to that point undefeated Bruderschaft des Kreuzes (BDK) (Ares, Claudio Castagnoli and Tursas), in a six-man tag team match. They followed that up by defeating the 2010 King of Trios runners up, The Colony (Fire Ant, Green Ant and Soldier Ant), in another six man tag team match the following day. Da Soul Touchaz's win streak came to an end on September 18, when they were defeated by the newly reformed F.I.S.T. (Chuck Taylor, Icarus and Johnny Gargano). During the rest of the year, Jaz, Richardson and Rockett scored two more victories over BDK, first in a six-man tag team match against Lince Dorado, Tim Donst and Tursas on September 19 and then in an eight-man tag team match, where they teamed with Sugar Dunkerton against Ares, Daizee Haze, Pinkie Sanchez and Tursas on November 20. The following day Da Soul Touchaz, who boasted over their victories over BDK and claimed to have their number, were ambushed and beat down by its members. The attack was used to explain the retirements of both C. Red and Dymond, with Jaz, Richardson and Rockett promising to exact revenge on BDK, becoming a more serious trio.

At the season ten premiere on January 23, 2011, BDK members Lince Dorado, Sara Del Rey and Tursas defeated Jaz, Richardson and Rockett via disqualification. On February 3, Da Soul Touchaz became the fourth team entered into the 2011 King of Trios. On April 15, Da Soul Touchaz were eliminated from the King of Trios by BDK representatives Tim Donst, Delirious and Jakob Hammermeier, following interference from Tursas. The following day, Marshe Rockett was eliminated from the Rey de Voladores tournament by BDK member Pinkie Sanchez with help from the group's own referee, Derek Sabato. In their next appearance on June 25, Da Soul Touchaz defeated Jakob Hammermeier, Tim Donst and Tursas in the main event of the show held in their hometown of Chicago, following interference from the returning C. Red. Marshe Rockett returned to Chikara in September, losing to Johnny Gargano and Ares in singles matches on the 18 and 19, respectively. Rockett, Acid Jaz and Willie Richardson returned to Chikara on November 10, 2012, in Chicago, when the three were defeated in a six-man tag team match by The Batiri (Kobald, Kodama and Obariyon). On May 18, 2013, Jaz and Rockett represented Da Soul Touchaz in the 2013 Tag World Grand Prix, but were eliminated in their first round match by Pieces of Hate (Jigsaw and The Shard).

=== Independent Wrestling Association Mid–South (2008–2010) ===
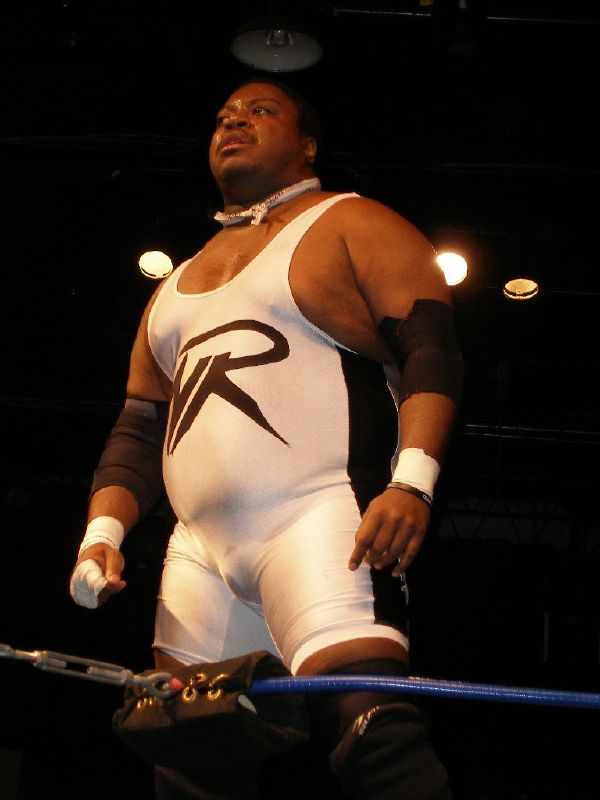
"The Urban American Dream" Willie "Da Bomb" Richardson

On August 17, 2008, Acid Jaz, Marshe Rockett and Willie Richardson made their debuts for Indiana–based Independent Wrestling Association Mid-South (IWA–MS), losing to Brian Skyline, Christian Able and Jeff Brooks in a six-man tag team match. The team picked up their first victory in the promotion on October 4, when Jaz and Rockett defeated Jason Hades and Troy Walters. At the following event on October 11, Jaz was granted a shot at Hades' IWA Mid-South Light Heavyweight Championship, but was unable to defeat him for the title. On December 6, 2008, Da Soul Touchaz, represented by Acid Jaz and Marshe Rockett, entered the second annual Candido Cup. In the first round of the tournament, Jaz and Rockett faced the Nintendogs (The Game Boy and Yellow Dog) and Team WLW (Darin Waid and Steve Anthony) in a three–way tag team match. The match ended with Team WLW being eliminated and Da Soul Touchaz and the Nintendogs advancing to the second round. Later that same day Da Soul Touchaz defeated the Strong Rednecks (Roderick Strong and Trevor Murdock) to advance to the semifinals, where they defeated Prince Mustafa Ali and Trik Davis to advance to the finals of the tournament, held that same day. In the finals of the tournament Jaz and Rockett defeated Michael Elgin and Sami Callihan to win the 2008 Candido Cup.

However, during the final match Jaz broke his leg and would spend the next eleven months sidelined from in–ring action, while Trauma was given the spot as Rockett's regular tag team partner. On June 7, 2009, IWA–MS held a benefit show to help pay for Jaz's medical bills. Jaz finally made his return on November 20, 2009, when he teamed with Rockett and Trauma in a six-man tag team match, where they defeated the Hooligans (Devin Cutter, Mason Cutter and Neil Diamond Cutter). Recently, IWA–MS had run into severe monetary issues and had cancelled many of its shows, before announcing that it would go forward with a much smaller budget. On May 16, 2010, Acid Jaz and Marshe Rockett made their to–date final appearance for IWA–MS, defeating Egotistico Fantastico and Sal Thomaselli in a tag team match.

=== Dragon Gate USA (2010) ===
On September 25, 2010, Da Soul Touchaz, being represented by Acid Jaz, Marshe Rockett and Willie Richardson, made their debut for Dragon Gate USA, defeating Billy Rayz, Danny Duggan and Gringo Loco in a dark match prior to the Untouchable 2010 pay-per-view. Later, in the pay-per-view section of the event, the three of them were defeated in a three–on–one handicap match by Brodie Lee.

== Championships and accomplishments ==
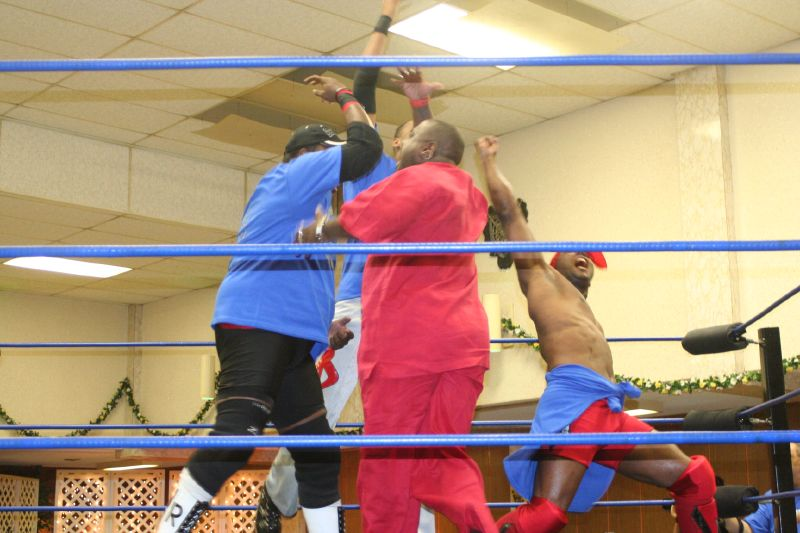
Da Soul Touchaz in June 2008

- Chicago Style Wrestling
  - CSW Tag Team Championship (2 times) – Jaz and Richardson
- DeathGrip Wrestling
  - King of Bourbon Street (2009) – Rockett
- Dreamwave Wrestling
  - Dreamwave Alternative Championship (1 time) – Rockett
- Elite Pro Wrestling
  - Elite Tag Team Championship (1 time) – Jaz and Rockett
- Gladiadores Aztecas de Lucha Libre Internacional
  - GALLI Championship (1 time) – Jaz
  - GALLI Tag Team Championship (1 time, current) – Richardson and Rockett
- Independent Wrestling Association Mid-South
  - Candido Cup (2008) – Jaz and Rockett
- Pro Wrestling Illustrated
  - PWI ranked Acid Jaz #295 of the top 500 singles wrestlers in the PWI 500 in 2009
- Resistance Pro Wrestling
  - RPW Tag Team Championship (1 time, current) – Jaz and Richardson
- Stars & Stripes Wrestling
  - SSW Lightweight Championship (2 times) – Jaz (1) and Rockett (1)
  - SSW Tag Team Championship (1 time) – Jaz, C. Red, Dymond, Richardson, Rockett and Trauma^{1}
- Universal Wrestling Alliance
  - UWA International Championship (1 time) – Trauma
  - UWA National TV Championship (1 time) – Trauma
- Urban American Pro Wrestling
  - UAPW Heavyweight Championship (1 time) – Trauma
  - UAPW Tag Team Championship (1 time) – Jaz and Rockett
- Vanguard Wrestling All–Star Alliance
  - VWAA Circuit Championship (1 time) – Richardson
  - VWAA Hardcore King (1 time) – C. Red
  - VWAA Tag Team Championship (1 time) – Richardson and Trauma
  - VWAA Women's Championship (1 time) – Dymond
- WAR Pro Wrestling
  - WAR Championship (1 times) – Jaz (1) and Rockett (1)
  - WAR Tag Team Championship (1 time, current) – Jaz and Rockett
- Windy City Pro Wrestling
  - WCPW Battle Royal Championship (1 time) – C. Red
  - WCPW Heavyweight Championship (2 times) – Richardson (1) and Trauma (1)
  - WCPW Lightweight Championship (2 times) – Jaz (1) and Rockett (1)
  - WCPW Women's Championship (1 time) – Dymond
- Other titles
  - Soul of America Urban Championship (1 time, current) – C. Red^{2}

^{1}Da Soul Touchaz defended the title under the Freebird Rule.
^{2}Championship not officially recognized by any promotion.
