= Warhorse (wrestler) =

American indie professional wrestler (born 1992)

WARHORSE
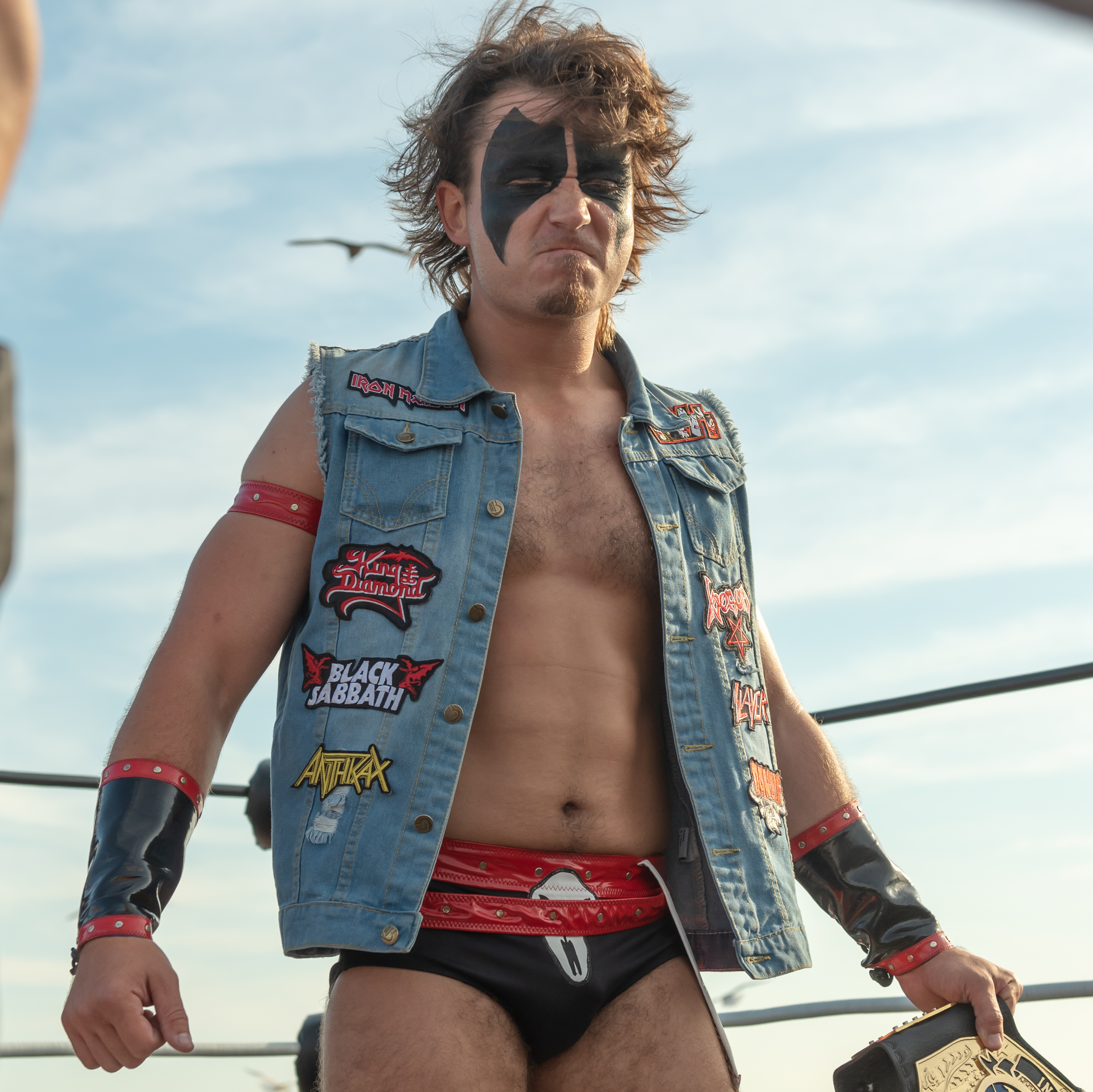
- WARHORSE in 2019

Personal information
- Born: Jake Parnell; December 26, 1992 St Louis, Missouri
- Children: 1

Professional wrestling career
- Ring name(s): Jake Parnell; WARHORSE; Brad Fox; Jackie Lee Bosch; Little Viking
- Billed height: 5 ft 11 in (1.80 m)
- Billed weight: 194 lb (88 kg)
- Trained by: Dynamo Pro Wrestling; Dingo; Ricky Cruz the Hooligans
- Debut: March 2013

Jake Parnell (born December 26, 1992) is an American professional wrestler better known by the ring name WARHORSE. He is the former IWTV/PWL Champion and has performed in various independent wrestling promotions across the United States and internationally. He is well known in the industry for a gruesome in-ring injury which occurred when Gary Jay ripped a turnbuckle out of his mouth, tearing his cheek open.

== Professional wrestling career ==
=== Independent scene (2013-present) ===
He made his professional wrestling debut as Jake Parnell in March 2013. One of his first matches was in Illinois with Dynamo Pro Wrestling against Alexandre Rudolph on March 5, 2013. That same month Parnell participated in a Triple Threat match against Dave Vaughn and Brandon Gallagher.

Parnell was originally a member of the Viking War Party, a group of Viking wrestlers composed of Alexandre Rudolph and Frank Wyatt. The team was active from Parnell's debut in 2013 to 2016 where Parnell was known as The Little Viking.

In 2019, Parnell, inspired by his love of heavy metal music and 1980s wrestling icons like The Road Warriors and Sting, reinvented himself as Warhorse, a Heavy Metal misfit with face paint that likes to headbang, yell, and "Rule Ass".

On September 21, 2019, Warhorse was crowned the IWTV (Independent Wrestling.tv) Champion after defeating Erick Stevens. Warhorse lost the title to Lee Moriarty on March 6, 2021.

In 2019, Warhorse was active in Game Changer Wrestling as part of the tag team "Warhausen" with fellow wrestler Danhausen.

On 13 July 2025, Warhorse's reign as PWL Heavyweight champion came to an end in Kingstanding, England, where he lost to MADD Dogg Max, who brought the title back to the UK.

On December 21st, 2025, Warhorse broke his fibula following a match with Kody Lane in Glory Pro Wrestling, requiring him to take medical leave from wrestling. Surgery was scheduled for early January, with a prospective return date being in the spring.

=== AEW (2020) ===
On July 29, 2020, Warhorse made his debut for All Elite Wrestling (AEW) on Dynamite where he challenged Cody Rhodes, who had established an open challenge for the TNT Championship, in a losing effort. This match was distinguished by the fact that Warhorse was not under contract with AEW at the time. His inclusion in the match was seen as being representative of AEW's willingness to include fan favorites.

On November 9, 2021, Warhorse wrestled Andrade El Idolo on AEW Dark. In June 2022, he wrestling on AEW Dark: Elevation in a tag match, teaming with Danny Adams against 2point0.

On October 2026, Warhorse made his AEW return after four years when he wrestled a dark match on Dynamite.

== Championships and accomplishments ==
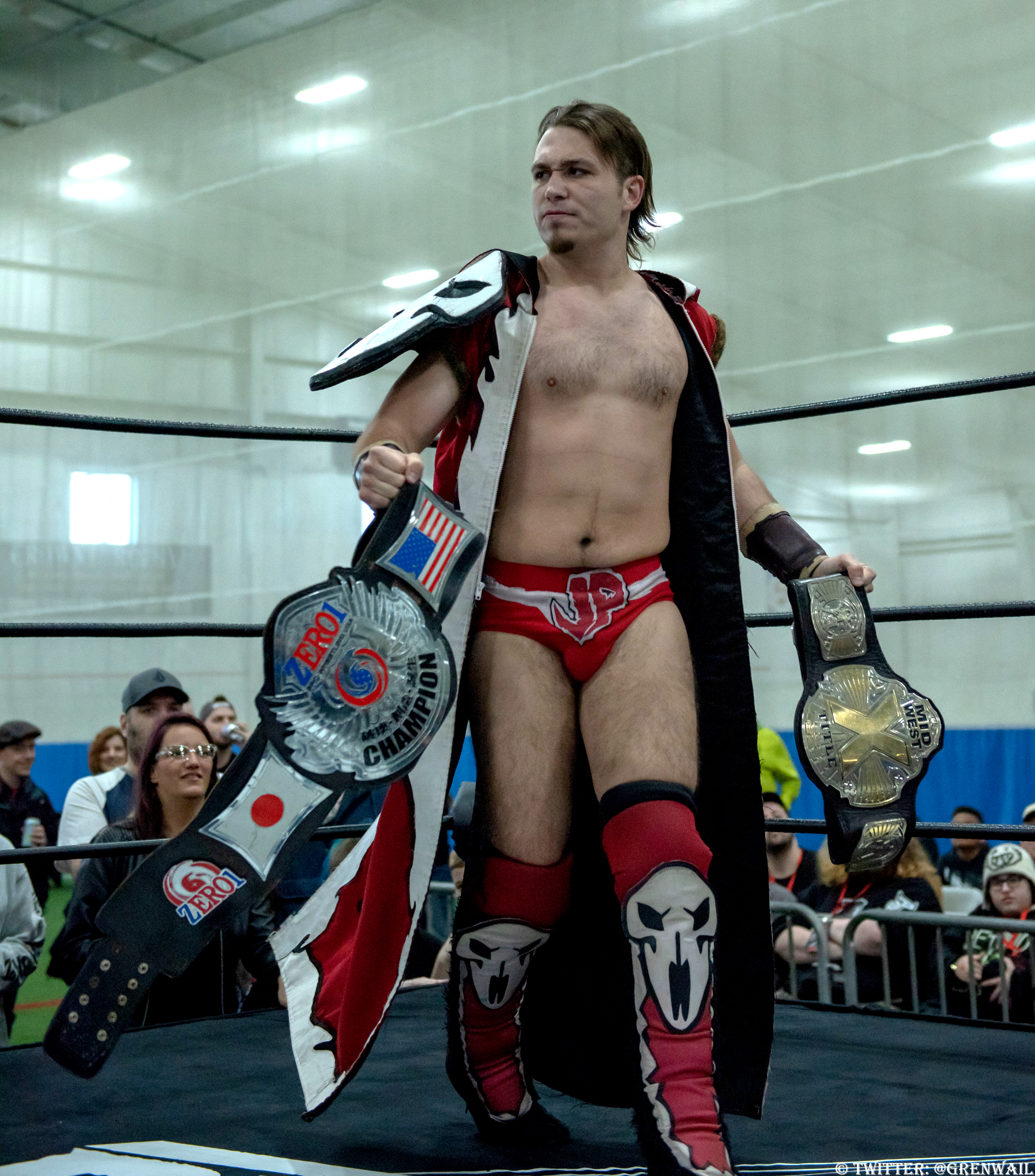
As Jake Parnell he was the simultaneous holder of the ZERO1 USA Heavyweight Championship and the Black Label Pro Midwest Champion

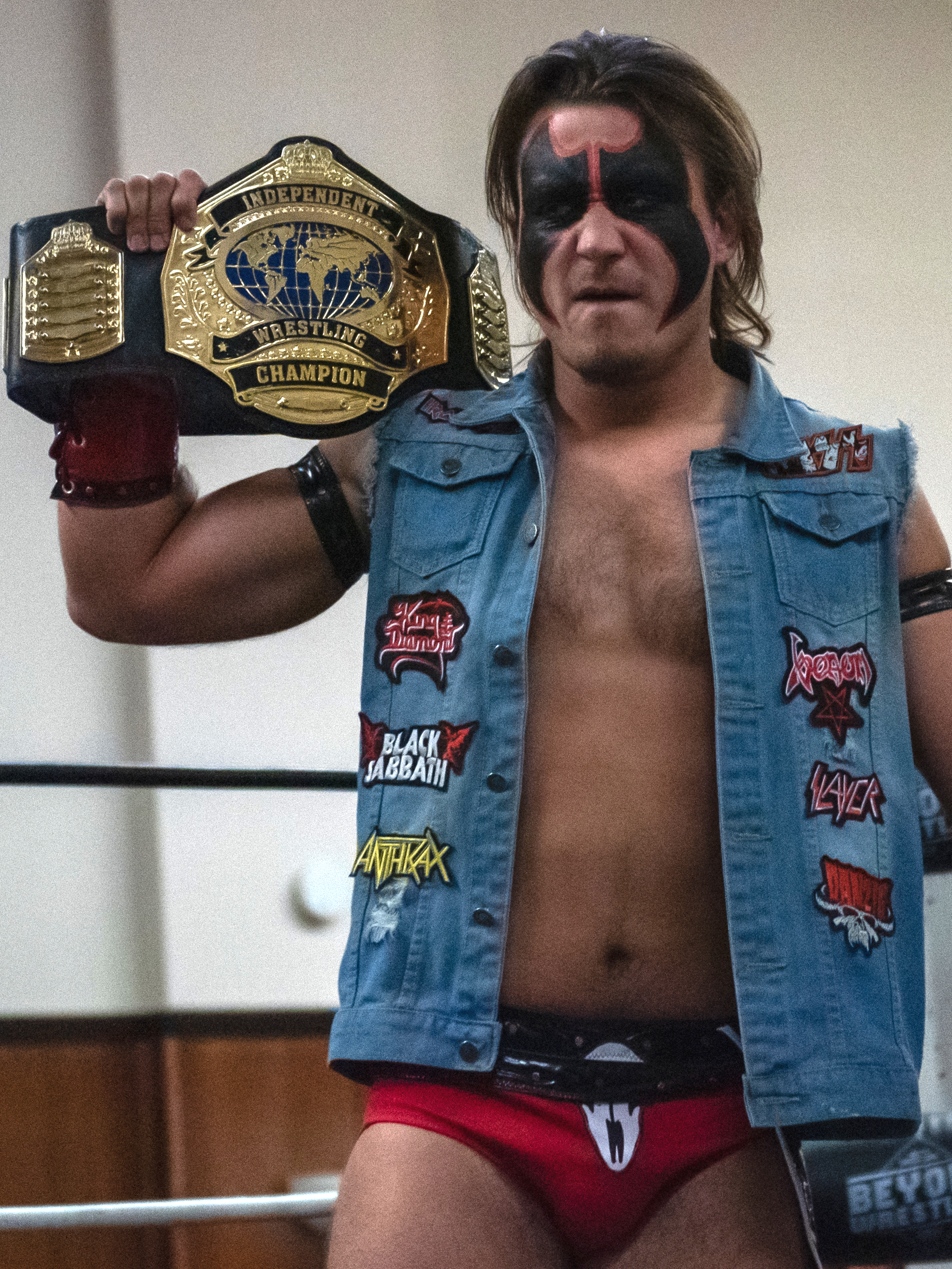
As Warhorse, he became IndependentWrestling.TV's Independent Wrestling Champion

- Chicago Style Wrestling
  - CSW Heavyweight Championship (1 time)
- Black Label Pro
  - BLP Midwest Championship (1 time)
  - Turbo Graps 16 (2019)
- Alpha-1 Wrestling
  - A1 Alpha Male Championship (1 time)
- Fully Loaded Wrestling
  - FLW Tag Team Championship (1 time) - with Alexandre Rudolph
- IndependentWrestling.TV
  - Independent Wrestling Championship (1 time)
- Relentless Wrestling
  - Relentless Heavyweight Championship (1 time)
  - Relentless Pacific Northwest Championship (1 time)
- Glory Pro Wrestling
  - Crown Of Glory Championship (1 time)
- Pro Wrestling Illustrated
  - Indie Wrestler of the Year (2020)
  - Ranked No. 97 of the top 500 singles wrestlers in the PWI 500 in 2021
- Lucha Libre And Laughs
  - LLL Heavyweight Championship (1 time)
- Pro Wrestling Live/Pro Wrestling Heat Up
  - PWL World Championship (1 time)
- Wrestling Over Everything
  - WOE Interstate Championship (1 time)
- F1RST Wrestling
  - F1RST Uptown VFW Championship (1 time)
- ACTION Wrestling
  - ACTION Championship (1 time)
- Pro Wrestling Epic
  - PWE Tag Team Championship (1 time, current) – with Herzog
- Pro Wrestling ZERO1 USA
  - ZERO1 USA Heavyweight Championship (1 time)
  - ZERO1 USA World Junior Heavyweight Championship (2 time)
  - ZERO1 USA World Tag Team Championship (2 time) - with Alexandre Rudolph (1) and Victor Analog (1)
- Frontline Pro
  - Frontline Pro Heavyweight Championship (1 time)
  - Freedom Cup (2024)
- Stricktly Nsane Pro Wrestling
  - SNPW Tag Team Championship (1 time) – with Alexandre Rudolph
- Saint Louis Anarchy
  - Destination Championship (1 time, current)
- Other Titles
  - Influence 24/7 Championship (1 time)
