= Zero1 USA World Junior Heavyweight Championship =

Professional wrestling championship title

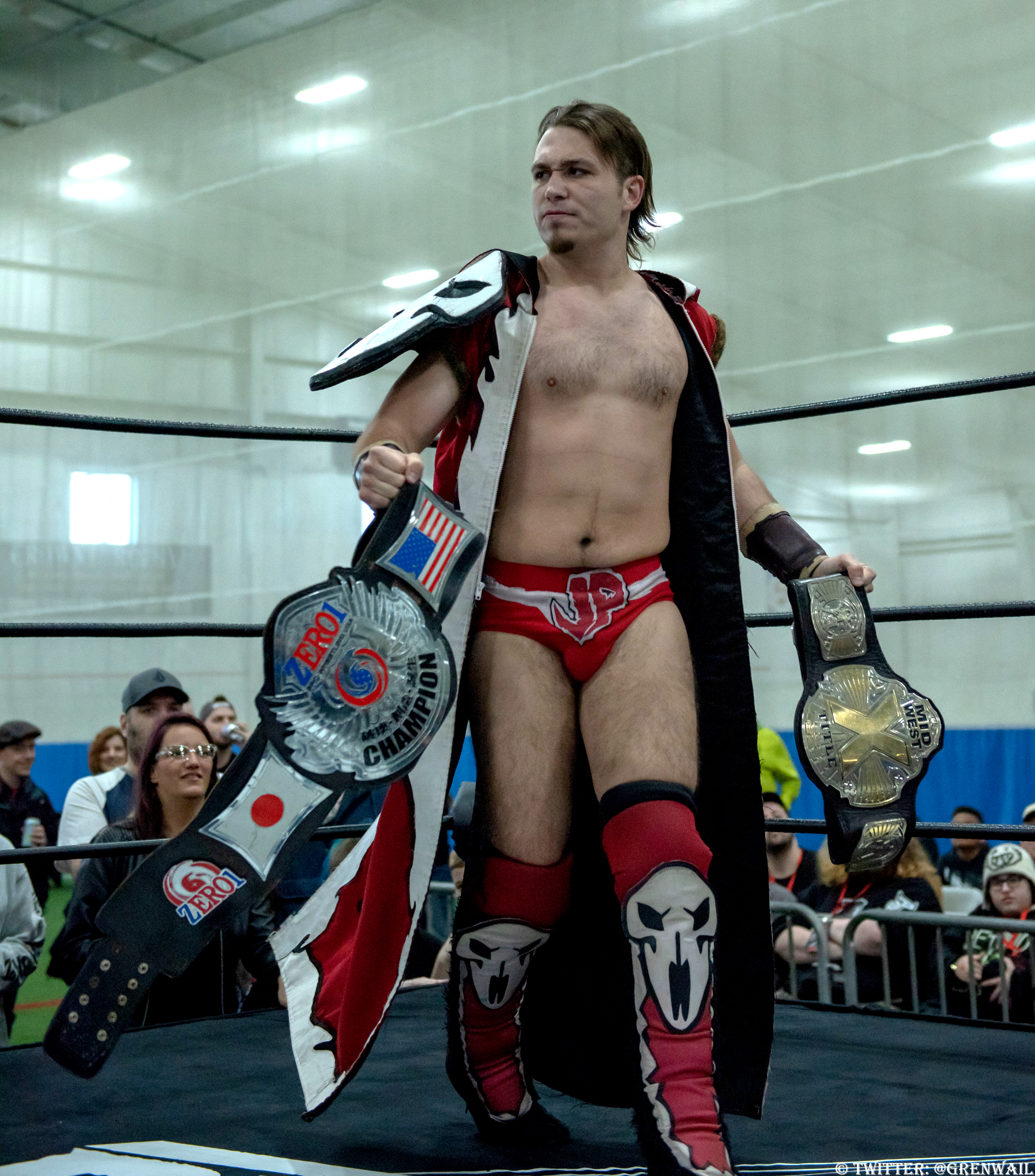
- Jake Parnell holding the title in his left hand in 2019

Details
- Promotion: National Wrestling Alliance (2003–2011); Pro Wrestling Zero1 / New Wrestling Alliance (2011–present)
- Date established: September 3, 2003
- Current champion: Joey O’Riley
- Date won: October 19th, 2024

Other names
- NWA Midwest X Division Championship (2003–2011); Zero1 USA Midwest X Division Championship (2011–2013)
Statistics
- First champion: Austin Aries
- Most reigns: WARHORSE (3 reigns)
- Longest reign: Oliver Cain (812 days)
- Shortest reign: Arya Daivari (<1 day)

The Zero1 USA World Junior Heavyweight Championship is a title defended in Pro Wrestling Zero1's American affiliate Zero1 USA. The title was previously defended in the Midwest territory of the National Wrestling Alliance as the NWA Midwest X Division Championship until 2011 when NWA Midwest disbanded following the stripping of Almighty Sheik (chairman of the territory) of the NWA Worlds Heavyweight Championship by NWA president Robert Trobich.

== Title history ==
Key
No.	Overall reign number
Reign	Reign number for the specific champion
Days	Number of days held
+	Current reign is changing daily

No.	Champion	Championship change			Reign statistics		Notes	Ref.
No.	Champion	Date	Event	Location	Reign	Days	Notes	Ref.
(NWA) National Wrestling Alliance
1	Austin Aries	September 6, 2003	N/A	Denmark, WI	1	216	Defeated Justin Kage and Shawn Daivari in a three-way match to become the first champion.	
2	Justin Kage	April 9, 2004	N/A	Milwaukee, WI	1	82		
3	Matt Sydal	June 30, 2004	N/A	Rock Island, WI	1	388		
4	Delirious	July 23, 2005	N/A	Streamwood, IL	1	112		
5	Matt Sydal	November 12, 2005	N/A	Streamwood, IL	2	84	Won the title when his partner in a tag team match, Daizee Haze pinned Delirious's partner MsChif.	
6	Jaysin Strife	February 4, 2006	N/A	Lawrence, KS	1	91		
7	Alex Shelley	May 6, 2006	N/A	Streamwood, IL	1	245	This was a four-way match also involving Jaysin Strife, Brandon Thomaselli and Acid Jazz.	
8	Jason Dukes	January 6, 2007	N/A	Streamwood, IL	1	505	This was a three-way match also involving Alex Shelley and The Mississippi Madman.	
9	Arya Daivari	May 25, 2008	N/A	Milwaukee, WI	1	0	Defeated Jason Dukes during the course of a one-night tournament.	
10	Egotistico Fantastico	May 25, 2008	N/A	Milwaukee, WI	1	229	Defeated Arya Daivari, Prince Ali and Troy Walters in the finals of a one-night tournament.	
—	Vacated	January 9, 2009	—	—	—	—		
11	Troy Walters	January 9, 2009	N/A	Milwaukee, WI	1	120	Defeated Jason Hades after Egotistico Fantastico vacated the belt.	
12	Bobby Valentino	May 9, 2009	N/A	Milwaukee, WI	1	76		
13	Troy Walters	July 24, 2009	N/A	Milwaukee, WI	2	189		
14	Mickey McCoy	January 29, 2010	N/A	Milwaukee, WI	1	49		
15	Dysfunction	March 19, 2010	N/A	West Allis, WI	1	119		
16	Mason Quinn	July 16, 2010	N/A	West Allis, WI	1	169	This was a three-way match also involving Dysfunction and TW3. The current length of this reign is uncertain.	
—	Vacated	January 1, 2011	—	—	—	—		
(NWA) National Wrestling Alliance / Pro Wrestling Zero1 (Zero1)
17	Oliver Cain	January 29, 2011	N/A	Mattoon, IL	1	812	This was a four-way match also involving Dacobra, Shank Barzini, and Jason Lyte. The championship became part of the Pro Wrestling Zero1 promotion after November 1, 2011 when some of the NWA Midwest affiliates left NWA.	
Pro Wrestling Zero1 (Zero1) / Pro Wrestling Zero1 (Zero1 USA)
18	Jonathan Gresham	April 20, 2013	N/A	Mattoon, IL	1	362		
19	Blake Steel	April 17, 2014	N/A	Champaign, IL	1	238		
20	Matt Cage	December 11, 2014	N/A	Champaign, IL	1	415		
21	Jordan Perry	January 30, 2016	N/A	Mattoon, IL	1	266		
22	Matt Cage	October 22, 2016	N/A	Mattoon, IL	2	161		
23	Jake Parnell	April 1, 2017	N/A	Mattoon, IL	1	301		
24	Gary Jay	January 27, 2018	N/A	Mattoon, IL	1	119	Last Man Standing Match	
25	Jake Parnell	May 26, 2018	N/A	Mattoon, IL	2	308	Steel Cage Match	
—	Vacated	May 25, 2019	—	—	—	—	Vacated when Jake Parnell won the Zero1 USA Heavyweight Championship and decided to continue competing in the company's heavyweight division.	
26	Jake Lander	May 25, 2019	N/A	Mattoon, IL	1	539	This was the final of the 2019 Zero1 USA Tenkaichi Junior Tournament in which Lander defeated Gary Jay to win the vacant title.	
—	Vacated	November 14, 2020	—	—	—	—	Vacated after Lander suffered a torn ACL & was diagnosed with compartment syndrome, needing to step away for multiple surgeries.	
27	Victor Analog	November 14, 2020	N/A	Noble, IL	1	287	Won in the finals of the 2020 Zero1 USA Tenkaichi Junior Tournament by defeating DaCobra.	
28	Jake Lander	August 28, 2021	N/A	Decatur, IL	2	21	This was a four-way tables, ladders & chairs match also involving Jimmy Karryt and Sabin Gauge.	
29	Jimmy Karryt	September 18, 2021	N/A	Mattoon, IL	1	224	Singles Match	
30	Mat Fitchett	April 30, 2022	N/A	Mattoon, IL	1	207	Singles Match	
—	Vacated	November 23, 2022	—	—	—	—	Vacated due to a shoulder injury.	
32	Victor Analog	December 17, 2022	Zero1 USA: How The Lowlifes Stole Christmas	Mattoon, IL	2	245	This was a four-way elimination match for the vacant title also featuring Anakin Murphy, Eli Wylder, & Devonte Knox.	
33	Jake Parnell	August 19, 2023	Zero1 USA: Homecoming 2023	Mattoon, IL	3	42	By winning this match, Warhorse became the first three-time champion in the title’s history.	
34	DaCobra	September 30, 2023	Zero1 USA Live Pro Wrestling featuring Chavo Guerrero	Clinton, IL	1	112		
35	Victor Analog	January 20, 2024	Zero1 USA New Year’s Retribution	Mattoon, IL	3	0	This was a four-way match that also included defending champion DaCobra & former champions Gary Jay & “Warhorse” Jake Parnell. Analog pinned Parnell for the first time in his career.	
36	Devonte Knox	January 20, 2024	Zero1 USA New Year’s Retribution	Mattoon, IL	1	273	Cashed in his contract for any title shot of his choosing at any time.	
37	Joey O’Riley	October 19, 2024	Zero1 USA Anniversary XVIII	Mattoon, IL	1	523	Won the title in a ladder match where if he lost, he would retire.	

=== Combined reigns ===
†	Indicates the current champion

Rank	Wrestler	No. of reigns	Combined days
1	Oliver Cain	1	812
2	Jake Parnell	3	651
3	Matt Cage	2	576
4	Jake Lander	2	560
5	Victor Analog	2	532
6	Jason Dukes	1	505
7	Matt Sydal	2	472
8	Jonathan Gresham	1	362
9	Troy Walters	2	322
10	Devonte Knox	1	273
11	Jordan Perry	1	266
12	Alex Shelley	1	245
13	Blake Steel	1	238
14	Egotistico Fantastico	1	229
15	Jimmy Karryt	1	224
16	Austin Aries	1	216
17	Mat Fitchett	1	207
18	Mason Quinn	1	169–197
19	Dysfunction	1	119
19	Gary Jay	1	119
20	DaCobra	1	112
20	Delirious	1	112
21	Jaysin Strife	1	91
22	Justin Kage	1	82
23	Bobby Valentino	1	63
24	Mickey McCoy	1	49
25	† Joey O’Riley	1	24
26	Arya Daivari	1	<1
