= Freelance World Tag Team Championship =

Professional wrestling championship

Details
- Promotion: Freelance Wrestling
- Date established: April 10, 2015
- Current champions: Bang and Matthews
- Date won: June 27, 2025

Other name
- Freelance Tag Team Championship (2015–2019)
Statistics
- First champion: The N Words
- Most reigns: Bang and Matthews (2 reigns)
- Longest reign: The Take It Homewreckers (833 days)
- Shortest reign: BUSSY (113 days)

The Freelance World Tag Team Championship is a professional wrestling championship promoted by Freelance Wrestling. The title was established as the Freelance Tag Team Championship in 2015 and adopted its current name in 2019. Bang and Matthews are the current champions; they defeated Homecookin to win the title on June 27, 2025.

== Title history ==
Championship name	Years
Freelance Tag Team Championship	2015–2019
Freelance World Tag Team Championship	2019–present

Key
No.	Overall reign number
Reign	Reign number for the specific champion
Days	Number of days held
+	Current reign is changing daily

No.	Champion	Championship change			Reign statistics		Notes	Ref.
No.	Champion	Date	Event	Location	Reign	Days	Notes	Ref.
1	The N Words; Acid Jaz and Bryce Benjamin	April 10, 2015	Born Sick	Chicago, Illinois	1	273		
2	Beauty and the Beast; Rob Matter and Stevie Fierce	January 8, 2016	Fresh Poison 2016	Chicago, Illinois	1	231		
3	The N Words; Acid Jaz and Bryce Benjamin	August 26, 2016	Big Trouble In Wicker Park	Chicago, Illinois	2	224		
4	The Superiority Complex; Roy Gordon and Tony Nas	April 7, 2017	Snakes? Why'd It Have To Be Snakes?	Chicago, Illinois	1	133		
5	Team BETA; Craig Mitchell and Kenny Sutra	August 18, 2017	Blood Feud	Chicago, Illinois	1	119		
6	The Four Star Heroes; Chris Castro and Matt Knicks	December 15, 2017	Always Fresh, Never Frozen	Chicago, Illinois	1	182		
7	The WorkHorsemen; Anthony Henry and JD Drake	June 15, 2018	Freelance Vs. The World - 4th Anniversary	Chicago, Illinois	1	427		
8	The Space Pirates; Shane Sabre and Space Monkey	August 16, 2019	Get Over Or Die Tryin'	Chicago, Illinois	1	203		
9	The Take It Homewreckers; Bucky Collins and Mikey	March 6, 2020	Lucky Punks	Chicago, Illinois	1	833		
10	The Bang Bros; August Matthews and Davey Bang	June 17, 2022	Freelance Vs. The World - 8th Anniversary	Chicago, Illinois	1	357		
11	GPA and Laynie Luck	June 9, 2023	Freelance Vs. The World 9	Chicago, Illinois	1	272		
12	BUSSY; Allie Katch and Effy	March 7, 2024	Injustice	Chicago, Illinois	1	113		
13	The Syndicate; Calvin Tankman and Shane Mercer	June 28, 2024	Freelance Vs. The World 10	Chicago, Illinois	1	176		
14	Homecookin; Dan The Dad and Kody Lane	December 21, 2024	Prelude	Chicago, Illinois	1	188		
15	Bang and Matthews; August Matthews and Davey Bang	June 27, 2025	Freelance Vs. The World 11	Chicago, Illinois	2	406+		

== See also ==
- Freelance World Championship
- Freelance Legacy Championship
