= Freelance World Championship =

Professional wrestling championship

Details
- Promotion: Freelance Wrestling
- Date established: June 12, 2015
- Current champion: Trevor Outlaw
- Date won: March 27, 2026

Other name
- Freelance Championship (2015–2018)
Statistics
- First champion: Isaias Velazquez
- Most reigns: Kylie Rae (3 reigns)
- Longest reign: Kylie Rae (636 days)
- Shortest reign: Storm Grayson (49 days)

The Freelance World Championship is a professional wrestling championship promoted by Freelance Wrestling. Established as the Freelance Championship in 2015, it was renamed the Freelance World Championship in 2018. Trevor Outlaw is the current champion; he defeated Devon Monroe to win the title on March 27, 2026.

== Title history ==
Championship name	Years
Freelance Championship	2015–2018
Freelance World Championship	2018–present

== Reigns ==
Key
No.	Overall reign number
Reign	Reign number for the specific champion
Days	Number of days held
+	Current reign is changing daily

No.	Champion	Championship change			Reign statistics		Notes	Ref.
No.	Champion	Date	Event	Location	Reign	Days	Notes	Ref.
1	Isaias Velazquez	June 12, 2015	Freelance Wrestling Vs. The World - 1st Anniversary	Chicago, Illinois	1	364		
2	Prince Mustafa Ali	June 10, 2016	Freelance Wrestling Vs. The World - 2nd Anniversary	Chicago, Illinois	1	182		
3	GPA	December 9, 2016	Triple Threat Level Midnight	Chicago, Illinois	1	175		
4	Stevie Fierce	June 2, 2017	Freelance Wrestling Vs. The World - 3rd Anniversary	Chicago, Illinois	1	196		
5	Suge D	December 15, 2017	Always Fresh, Never Frozen	Chicago, Illinois	1	84		
6	Darin Corbin	March 9, 2018	This Very Moment	Chicago, Illinois	1	98		
7	Isaias Velazquez	June 15, 2018	Freelance Vs. The World - 4th Anniversary	Chicago, Illinois	2	231		
8	Kylie Rae	February 1, 2019	Sleepless In Chicago	Chicago, Illinois	1	77		
9	Ethan Page	April 19, 2019	Burn After Watching	Chicago, Illinois	1	238		
10	Kylie Rae	December 13, 2019	War Is Inevitable	Chicago, Illinois	2	636		
—	Vacated	September 9, 2021	—	Chicago, Illinois	—	—		
11	Robert Anthony	December 17, 2021	Ding Ding Ding All The Way	Chicago, Illinois	1	182		
12	Storm Grayson	June 17, 2022	Freelance Vs. The World - 8th Anniversary	Chicago, Illinois	1	49		
13	Robert Anthony	August 5, 2022	Cheap Pop	Chicago, Illinois	2	189		
14	Storm Grayson	February 10, 2023	Three Cheers For Sweet Revenge	Chicago, Illinois	2	623		
15	Kylie Rae	October 25, 2024	Be Careful What You Wish For	Chicago, Illinois	3	57		
16	Alfonso Gonzalez	December 21, 2024	Prelude	Chicago, Illinois	1	111		
17	Devon Monroe	April 11, 2025	Nonstop Momentum	Chicago, Illinois	1	350		
18	Trevor Outlaw	March 27, 2026	Lucky Charm	Chicago, Illinois	1	133+	Outlaw defeated Devon Monroe.	

== See also ==
- Freelance Legacy Championship
- Freelance World Tag Team Championship
