= Freelance Legacy Championship =

Professional wrestling championship

Details
- Promotion: Freelance Wrestling
- Date established: June 14, 2019
- Current champion: Chico Suave
- Date won: September 20, 2025
Statistics
- First champion: Eye Candy Elliott
- Longest reign: Robert Anthony (587 days)
- Shortest reign: Eye Candy Elliott (182 days)

The Freelance Legacy Championship is a professional wrestling championship promoted by Freelance Wrestling. The title was established in 2019. Chico Suave is the current champion; he defeated Koda Hernandez and Sabin Gauge to win the title on September 20, 2025.

== Title history ==
Key
No.	Overall reign number
Reign	Reign number for the specific champion
Days	Number of days held
+	Current reign is changing daily

No.	Champion	Championship change			Reign statistics		Notes	Ref.
No.	Champion	Date	Event	Location	Reign	Days	Notes	Ref.
1	Eye Candy Elliott	June 14, 2019	Freelance Vs. The World - 5th Anniversary	Chicago, Illinois	1	182		
2	Effy	December 13, 2019	War Is Inevitable	Chicago, Illinois	1	302		
3	Robert Anthony	October 10, 2020	I Don't Think We're In Chicago Anymore	Indianapolis, Indiana	1	587		
4	Bryan Keith	May 20, 2022	Over The Top	Chicago, Illinois	1	525		
5	Darin Corbin	October 27, 2023	Dead By Dawn	Chicago, Illinois	1	245		
6	Koda Hernandez	June 28, 2024	Freelance Vs. The World 10	Chicago, Illinois	1	449		
7	Chico Suave	September 20, 2025	Sour Graps	Chicago, Illinois	1	321+	Suave defeated Koda Hernandez and Sabin Gauge.	

== See also ==
- Freelance World Championship
- Freelance World Tag Team Championship
