= Freelance Wrestling =

American independent professional wrestling promotion

- Acronym: Freelance
- Founded: 2014
- Style: Professional wrestling
- Headquarters: Chicago, Illinois, U.S.
- Founder: Nick Almendarez
- Owner: Nick Almendarez
- Website: freelancewrestling.com

Freelance Wrestling is an American independent professional wrestling promotion based in Chicago, Illinois. It was founded in 2014 by wrestler Nick Almendarez, who performs under the ring name Matt Knicks. The promotion holds most of its events in the Logan Square neighborhood, primarily at the Logan Square Auditorium, and operates a training school, the Freelance Wrestling Academy.

== History ==
Almendarez, who grew up in Bridgeview, Illinois, began wrestling in 2010 and founded Freelance Wrestling in 2014, saying he wanted a more community-oriented professional wrestling outlet in Chicago that would give opportunities to emerging local talent. The promotion combines wrestling with a punk rock presentation, and its performers and fans use the slogan "Freelance is Home".

In May 2015, the Chicago Tribune reported that Freelance was set to debut a weekly television program on The U Too, a WCIU-TV digital subchannel, hosted by Mark Maxwell and Nick Hausman.

On December 4, 2015, CM Punk made his first known appearance at a professional wrestling event since leaving WWE, at Freelance's Raw Power show. Draped in a cloak and referred to by the announcers as Kikutaro's "nameless mentor", Punk accompanied Kikutaro to the ring but did not wrestle.

The promotion's shows at the Logan Square Auditorium were the subject of a 2017 Chicago magazine photo essay by Michael Jarecki. A 2018 WGN-TV report profiled Freelance as one of more than a dozen independent wrestling promotions running shows in Chicago, noting that its wrestlers work as independent contractors without employer-provided health insurance. By May 2018, Freelance was holding monthly events at the Logan Square Auditorium.

In November 2024, WWE announced at a Freelance show that Kylie Rae, then the reigning Freelance Champion, had been signed to its Independent Development (WWE ID) program.

== Championships ==
Freelance promotes three championships: the Freelance World, Legacy and World Tag Team championships.

As of August 6, 2026
Championship	Current champion(s)	Reign	Date won	Days held	Location	Note	Ref.
Freelance World Championship	Trevor Outlaw	1	March 27, 2026	135+	Chicago, Illinois	Defeated Devon Monroe after cashing in the Red Medallion at Lucky Charm.	
Freelance Legacy Championship	Chico Suave	1	September 20, 2025	323+	Chicago, Illinois	Defeated Koda Hernandez and Sabin Gauge at Sour Graps.	
Freelance World Tag Team Championship	Bang and Matthews (August Matthews and Davey Bang)	2 (2, 2)	June 27, 2025	408+	Chicago, Illinois	Defeated Homecookin (Dan The Dad and Kody Lane) at Freelance vs. the World XI.	

== Freelance Wrestling Academy ==
Freelance opened a training school, the Freelance Wrestling Academy, in 2019 in a warehouse behind the Pro Wrestling Tees store in the Bucktown neighborhood; Pro Wrestling Tees is the promotion's main sponsor. Wrestlers Isaias Velazquez and Bryce Benjamin served as the academy's head trainers. As of 2024, the academy held classes four days a week, typically with 20 to 25 students of varying experience levels.
