= Egotistico Fantastico =

American wrestler (born 1982)

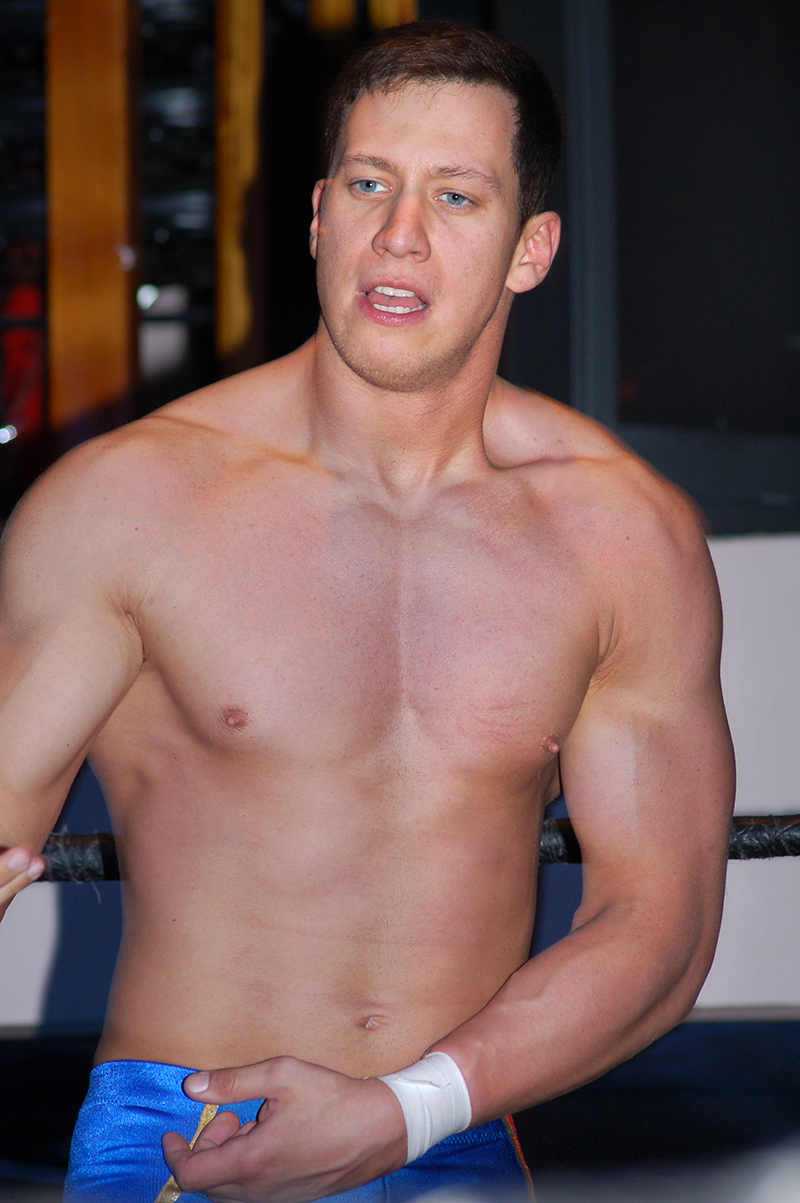

Personal information
- Born: Robert Anthony; June 11, 1982 (age 44) Romeoville, Illinois, U.S.

Professional wrestling career
- Ring name(s): Egotistico Fantastico; Ego Fantastico; Ravishing Roberta; Robert Anthony; Mystery Man; Cyon
- Billed height: 6 ft 3 in (1.91 m)
- Billed weight: 210 lb (95 kg)
- Billed from: New Jersey; Joliet, Illinois
- Trained by: Harley Race; John Burke; Sonny Rogers
- Debut: November 23, 2001

Robert Anthony (born June 11, 1982) is an American professional wrestler and promoter, better known by his ring name Egotistico Fantastico. currently working on the independent circuit. He is also owner for EGO Pro Wrestling. He is best known for his time in All Elite Wrestling (AEW) and the National Wrestling Alliance (NWA), where he competed under the ring name Cyon and was a former one-time NWA National Champion.

Anthony is also known for his tenures with Combat Zone Wrestling (CZW) where he is a former CZW World Heavyweight Champion, as well as a former World Junior Heavyweight Champion. He is also a one-time CZW Iron Man Champion, and was the last person to hold the championship.

== Professional wrestling career ==
=== Early career (2001–2006) ===
Anthony debuted in 2001 under the ring name Egotistico Fantastico, a luchador gimmick, and began competing for Pro Championship Wrestling. While in PCW, he captured the promotion's Heavyweight Championship. He would also take the gimmick to various promotions, most notably Ring of Honor, ROH's sister promotion Full Impact Pro, and Combat Zone Wrestling.

=== World Wrestling Entertainment (2006–2008, 2017) ===
In November 2006, Anthony was signed to a developmental contract by World Wrestling Entertainment before being assigned to the developmental territory Deep South Wrestling. While in DSW, he began competing under his real name instead of the Egotistico Fantastico gimmick. When DSW was shut down, Anthony was transferred over to Florida Championship Wrestling, where he continued to train until he was released from his developmental contract in February 2008.

In May 2017 he wrestled with Velveteen Dream, where he lost to him on NXT.

=== Return to the independent circuit (2008–present) ===
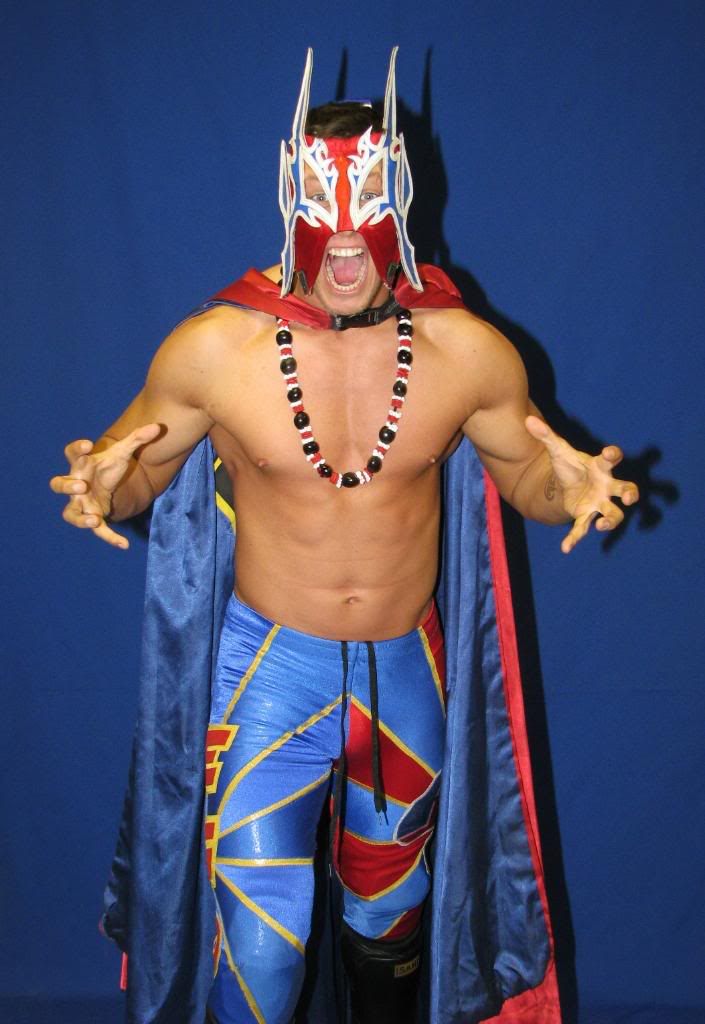
Anthony as Egotistico Fantastico

Following his release from WWE, Anthony returned to wrestling in the independent circuit for promotions such as All American Wrestling, Independent Wrestling Association Mid-South and Combat Zone Wrestling. As Egotistico Fantastico, he made his debut for IWA-MS in April soon became a mainstay for the promotion after a series of high-profile matches during the Ted Petty Invitational in 2008. On May 26, 2012, Anthony Was defeated by Ryan Slade in a Pro Wrestling Blitz event. On February 6, 2015, Anthony made his debut for Freelance Wrestling Where he was defeated by Craig Mitchell. On February 28, 2015, Anthony defeated Mr Flores at Pro Wrestling Blitz event.

=== Combat Zone Wrestling (2009–2012) ===
Later on in 2008, Egotistico Fantastico joined CZW. In June 2009 he won CZW's the Best Of The Best 9 tournament. On October 9, 2010, Anthony returned to CZW unmasked, using the ring name "The Ego" Robert Anthony.

In December 2010 he became number one contender for a major title for the first time in his career: the CZW World Heavyweight Championship, by winning a match at CZW Cage of Death XII. On February 13, 2011, at CZW Twelve: The Twelfth Anniversary Event, he defeated Jon Moxley for the CZW World Heavyweight title. Anthony lost the title on April 9, 2011, to Devon Moore. As of 2012, Anthony is not part of CZW Roster.

=== Resistance Pro (2012–2014) ===
He is currently wrestling in Resistance Pro. He wrestled for months before getting a number one contenders match against Jay Bradley at Taken By Force on June 15, 2012, and also appeared at the previous four Resistance Pro events. On October 20, 2012, he defeated Bradley and Bobby Lashley to win the RPW Heavyweight Championship. He would hold the title for 399 days, before losing it to Jocephus on November 23, 2013. On May 16, 2014, Anthony and Jocephus defeated Da Soul Touchaz (Acid Jaz & Willie Richardson) for the RPW Tag Team Championship.

=== Juggalo Championship Wrestling (2014) ===
Anthony made his debut for JCW as his Ego Fantastico character on May 11, 2014, where he was defeated by The Weedman at the JCW Road to the Gathering Tour.

=== All Elite Wrestling (2020–2022) ===
Anthony made his AEW in-ring debut under his real name on the March 24, 2020 edition of AEW Dark. Anthony appeared in a tag team with Shawn Spears and his manager Tully Blanchard against the team of SoCal Uncensored. Upon being abandoned during the match by Spears, he was pinned by Frankie Kazarian. This led to his rejection as a permanent tag team partner of Spears, who gave him a beat down after the match. Anthony appeared again on the June 9, 2020 edition of AEW Dark, losing to AEW World Champion Jon Moxley in a non-title match. He would then lose a one-sided match against Brian Cage on the June 23, 2020 edition of Dark. Anthony faced Darby Allin in a losing effort on the July 21, 2020 edition of Dark. After the match, both Anthony and Allin were attacked by Brian Cage and Ricky Starks.

=== National Wrestling Alliance (2021–2023) ===
Anthony debuted on NWA Powerrr as a Masked Mystery Man, subsequently being named Cyon. At Hard Times 2, he unsuccessfully challenged Tyrus for the NWA Television Title. On night one of the NWA 74th Anniversary Show, Cyon defeated Jax Dane to win the NWA National Championship. On April 7, 2023, at NWA 312, Cyon would lose the title against EC3.

== Championships and accomplishments ==
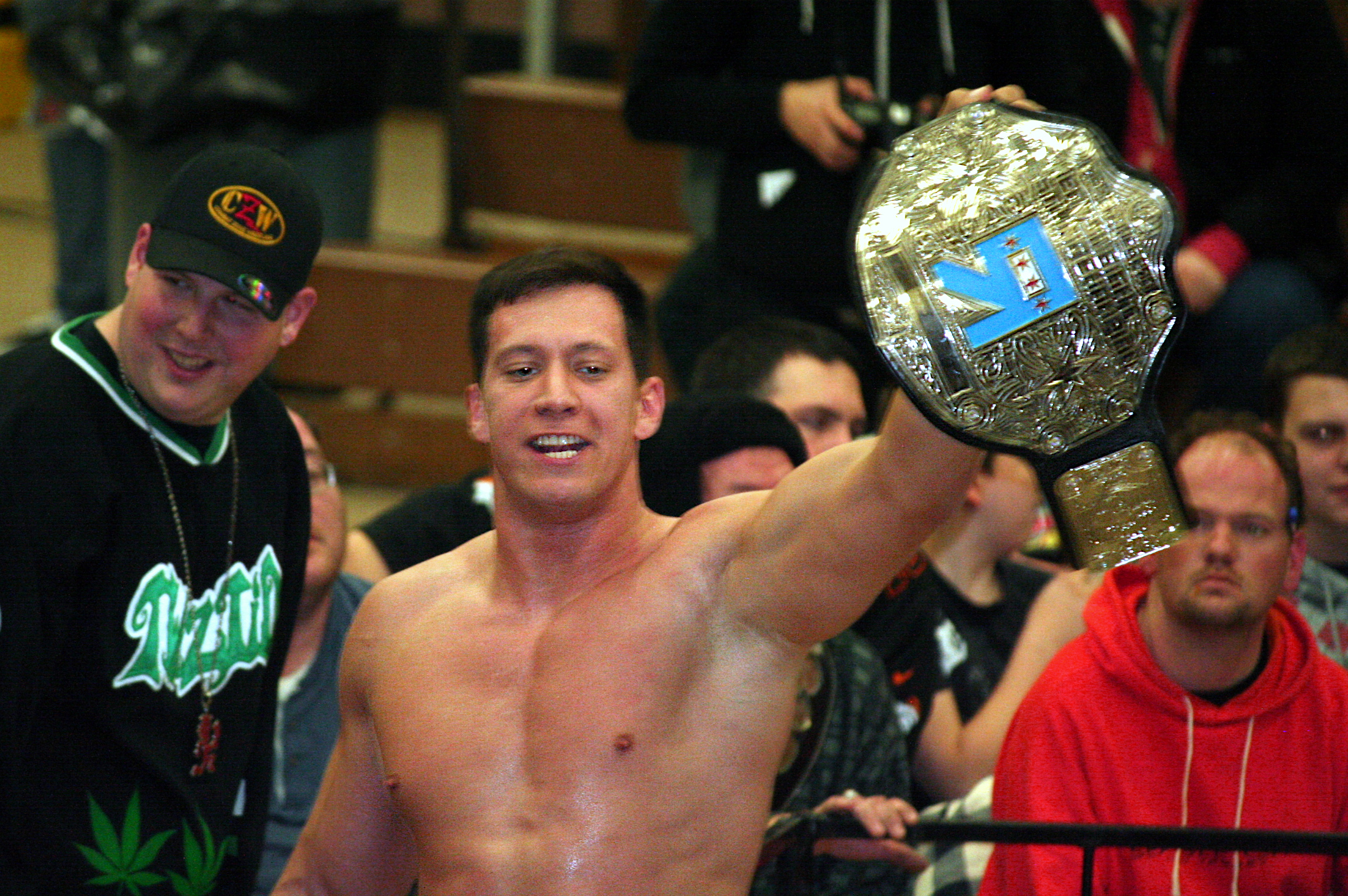
Anthony with the RPW Heavyweight Championship belt in February 2013

- 3X Wrestling
  - 3XW Heavyweight Championship (2 times)
  - Gauntlet for the Gold (2006)
  - Most Popular Wrestler of the Year (2005)
- All American Wrestling
  - AAW Heavyweight Championship (1 time)
  - AAW Heritage Championship (1 time)
- Combat Zone Wrestling
  - CZW New Horror Championship (1 time)
  - CZW World Junior Heavyweight Championship (1 time)
  - CZW World Heavyweight Championship (1 time)
  - Best of the Best 9
- Freelance Wrestling
  - Freelance Legacy Championship (1 time)
  - Freelance World Championship (2 times)
  - Freelance World Title Tournament (2021)
- Insane Championship Wrestling USA
  - ICW Heavyweight Championship (1 time)
  - ICW Midwest Championship (1 time)
  - ICW Tag Team Championship (1 time) - with Justin Dredd
  - Best of the Midwest II (2008)
- International Wrestling Cartel
  - IWC Super Indy Championship (1 time)
  - Super Indy X (2011)
- Lancashire Wrestling Federation
  - LWF Independent Championship (1 time)
- POWW Entertainment
  - POWW Regional Television Championship (1 time)
- Mercury-1 Wrestling
  - Mercury-1 Heavyweight Championship (1 time)
- National Wrestling Alliance
  - NWA National Championship (1 time)
  - Champions Series (2021) – with Jax Dane, Trevor Murdoch, Colby Corino and Jennacide
- NWA Midwest
  - NWA Midwest X Division Championship (1 time)
- Pro Championship Wrestling
  - PCW Cruiserweight Championship (1 time)
  - PCW Heavyweight Championship (1 time)
- Pro Wrestling Blitz
  - PWB King of Blitz Championship (1 time)
- Pro Wrestling Illustrated
  - PWI ranked him #193 of the top 500 singles wrestlers in the PWI 500 in 2012
- Resistance Pro Wrestling
  - RPW Heavyweight Championship (1 time)
  - RPW Tag Team Championship (1 time) – with Jocephus
  - Lethal Lottery Tournament (2014)
