= Jay Bradley =

American professional wrestler

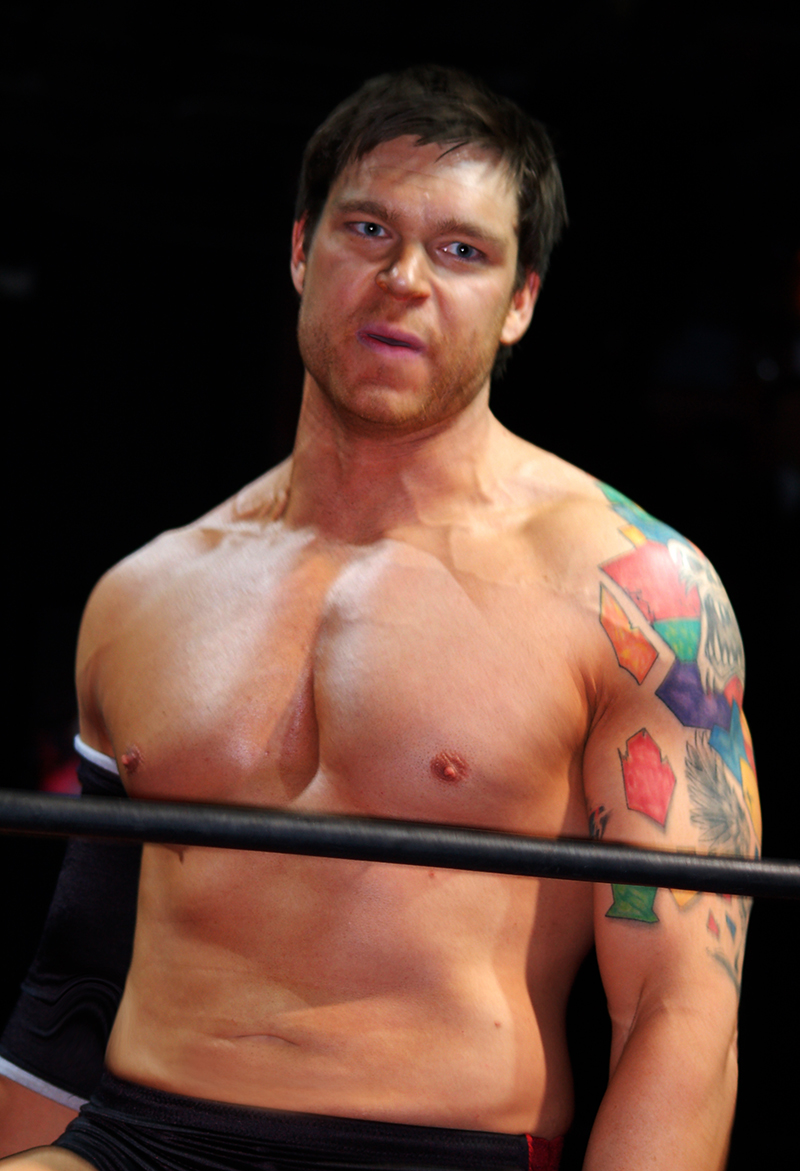
- Bradley in 2012

Personal information
- Born: Bradley Thomas Jay; November 17, 1980 (age 45) Downers Grove, Illinois, U.S.

Professional wrestling career
- Ring name(s): Aiden O'Shea; Brad Bradley; Bradley Jay; Jay Bradley; Ryan Braddock
- Billed height: 6 ft 4 in (193 cm)
- Billed weight: 260 lb (118 kg)
- Billed from: Chicago, Illinois; Southside of Chicago
- Trained by: Steel Domain Wrestling; Ace Steel; Danny Dominion; Kevin Quinn; Deep South Wrestling; Inoki Dojo
- Debut: 1999

Bradley Thomas Jay (born November 17, 1980) is an American professional wrestler, best known for his time in Impact Wrestling under the ring names of Jay Bradley and Aiden O'Shea, and WWE as Ryan Braddock.

== Professional wrestling career ==
=== Early career (1999–2005) ===
Bradley started his wrestling training at the Steel Domain Wrestling school in Chicago, where he trained with wrestlers including CM Punk and Colt Cabana. Bradley suffered several setbacks in his career as he suffered from an overactive thyroid. He worked for several independent promotions in the Mid-West, most notably for IWA Mid-South, before signing a developmental contract with World Wrestling Entertainment (WWE).

=== World Wrestling Entertainment (2005–2009) ===
He debuted in WWE's then-developmental territory Deep South Wrestling (DSW) as "The Monster of the Midway" Bradley Jay. During his time in DSW he won the Deep South Heavyweight Championship on three occasions. He also wrestled dark matches for both the Raw and SmackDown! brands. Occasionally, he made appearances on Heat as well. When WWE ended their relationship with DSW he was then sent to Ohio Valley Wrestling (OVW) to continue his development.

On May 16, he debuted in OVW under the name "Jay Bradley", defeating former OVW Heavyweight Champion, Chet the Jett. He defeated Paul Burchill and Idol Stevens in a three-way match via two Lariats to win the OVW Heavyweight Championship on June 1 at OVW's first Summer Sizzler Series event at Six Flags Kentucky Kingdom in Louisville, Kentucky to become the first man to hold both the OVW and DSW heavyweight titles. On June 15, 2007, at Ohio Valley Wrestling's third Super Summer Sizzler Series event of the year at Six Flags Kentucky Kingdom in Louisville, Kentucky, he defeated Idol Stevens to retain the OVW title. He then lost the title to Paul Burchill in a match taped on June 27 and aired on June 30. He also wrestled at Raw house shows on August 11 and 12 and September 1 (losing to "Hacksaw" Jim Duggan). He wrestled in a dark match against D'Lo Brown before a SmackDown television taping in August 2007. On December 19, in OVW, he won the "Love Thy Neighbor" four corners tag team match to win a future OVW Heavyweight title shot. He then was starting a feud with Matt Sydal and had defeated him in a tag team match where he and Mike Kruel defeated Sydal and Charles Evans. Unfortunately, before Bradley could exercise his title opportunity, OVW was dropped by World Wrestling Entertainment as a development territory.

Bradley debuted on the main SmackDown roster on the August 15, 2008, episode of the show, under the name "Ryan Braddock". He was easily defeated by Big Show after a knockout punch. At the August 14, 2008, Florida Championship Wrestling (FCW) television taping, Bradley wrestled under the Ryan Braddock name once again, making it his permanent and new ring name. On the August 22 episode of SmackDown, Braddock competed in a battle royal to qualify for the WWE Championship Scramble match at Unforgiven, but was eliminated by Big Show, who was not officially in the match. On the September 2 episode of ECW, Braddock faced Ricky Ortiz in a losing effort after being pinned by Ortiz's Big O finisher. On the September 19 episode of SmackDown, Braddock competed in a one fall match-up with Festus, who was accompanied by Jesse. Braddock won the match as a result of a disqualification, after Jesse and Festus wrapped him in bubble wrap and duct tape. Following this match, Braddock returned to FCW before being released from WWE in March 2009.

=== Independent circuit (2009–present) ===
After his release from WWE, Bradley began working for the Berwyn, Illinois based All American Wrestling promotion and on March 28, 2009, defeated Tyler Black, Chandler McClure and Egotistico Fantastico to win the AAW Heavyweight Championship. He held the title for five months, before losing it to Jimmy Jacobs on September 5. He also worked for Florida-based Full Impact Pro, losing to T. J. Perkins in his debut match on June 6, 2009.

In 2011, Bradley joined Billy Corgan's wrestling promotion, Resistance Pro. At the promotion's debut show he defeated Icarus.

In November 2012, Bradley made his debut for Extreme Rising at their iPPV debut show Remember November defeating Christian York.

At RPW Draw the Line, Bradley and Mad Man Pondo won the RPW Tag Team Championship. they were stripped of the titles on the same day.

On July 9, 2015, Bradley competed in a triple threat match against Joey Avalon and Matt Cage for Global Force Wrestling for their GFW Grand Slam Tour in Appleton, Wisconsin, Avalon won after pinning Cage.

=== Return to OVW (2013–2014) ===
Bradley returned to OVW after his appearance on Impact Wrestling Gut Check. Bradley's first match since returning to OVW was against Tommy Gunn on March 6 which he won. On May 8, Bradley teamed with Rob Terry to face The Coalition (Raul LaMotta & Shiloh Jonze) they ended up getting the victory by DQ after the other members of The Coalition interfered. On May 22, 2013, Bradley defeated the OVW Heavyweight Champion Jamin Olivencia in a non-title match. On June 19, 2013, Bradley was defeated by Rob Terry in a number one contenders match for the OVW Heavyweight Championship. On September 7, 2013, Bradley unsuccessfully challenged Jamin Olivencia for the OVW Heavyweight Championship in a loaded boomstick on a pole match. On December 11, 2013, Bradley and Terry began teaming again getting wins over The Rockstars (Rockstar Spud and Ryan Howe) on two separate occasions. On January 1, 2014, Bradley defeated Deonta Davis and Leon Shelly in a two on one handicap match during an OVW Live Event. On January 4, 2014, Bradley faced Ryan Howe that ended in a no contest they had a rematch where Howe defeated Bradley in a street fight. on January 11, Bradley defeated Leon Shelly. on January 18, at OVW TV, Bradley defeated Bud Dwight. on January 25, Bradley defeated Robbie Walker. On February 1, 2014, at OVW TV, Bradley competed in the Nightmare rumble won by Johnny Spade. on February 1, 2014, at OVW Saturday Night Special, Bradley faced Ryan Howe in a losing effort.

=== Total Nonstop Action Wrestling (2013–2014) ===
On the January 10, 2013, episode of Impact Wrestling, Bradley appeared as part of the Impact Wrestling Gut Check, defeating Brian Cage. The following week, Bradley was chosen over Cage by the storyline Gut Check judges to earn a contract in Impact Wrestling.

Bradley returned on the May 16 episode of Impact Wrestling, defeating Christian York in the first qualifying round for the Bound for Glory Series Gut Check Tournament. On June 2 at Slammiversary XI, Bradley defeated Sam Shaw to qualify for the 2013 Bound for Glory Series. Bradley would go to lose all of his beginning matches in the BFG series to the likes of Austin Aries, Hernandez, and Joseph Park. Bradley ended his participation in the tournament on the August 28 episode of Impact Wrestling Xplosion, with a pinfall victory over Joseph Park, finishing eleventh out of the ten other wrestlers in a tie with Hernandez in the tournament. On January 13, 2014, Bradley was released from his Impact Wrestling contract.

=== Wrestle-1 (2013) ===
As part of a working relationship between TNA and Wrestle-1 it was announced on November 6, 2013, that Bradley would be working a tour for the Japanese promotion between November 16 and December 1. In their debut match for the promotion, Bradley and fellow TNA worker Rob Terry defeated Kaz Hayashi and Shuji Kondo in a tag team match. Bradley and Terry remained undefeated in tag team matches for the entire tour, but Bradley's tour ended with a three match losing streak in singles matches against his fellow Impact Wrestling worker.

=== Return to TNA (2015–2017) ===
On October 4, 2015, at Bound for Glory, Bradley made his return to Impact Wrestling under the ring name Aiden O'Shea (and began using an Irish ruffian gimmick) and competed in a twelve-man Bound For Gold Gauntlet match which was won by Tyrus. During October and November, O'Shea also competed in the first TNA World Title Series tournament that was taped in July 2015 as a member of Group Wildcard, where he ended third of his block by only defeating Crazzy Steve to receive 3 points. On January 8, 2016, at One Night Only: Live, O'Shea was defeated by Rockstar Spud after they had a confrontation in the ring. On the October 6, 2016, episode of Impact Wrestling, O'Shea made his return to Impact Wrestling after his hiatus, accompanying Impact Wrestling President Billy Corgan to the ring and serving as muscle/representative. Bradley left TNA quietly in 2017.

=== Second Return to OVW (2017–2020) ===
O'Shea made his return to OVW on April 28, 2017, at Run For The Ropes III where he won a battle royal to face the OVW Heavyweight Championship. Later that night, O'Shea was unsuccessful at winning the OVW Heavyweight Championship against Big Jon. On May 13, at OVW Saturday Night Special Uprising, Bradley was defeated by Justin Smooth. On June 2, 2018, Bradley and Shiloh Jonze unsuccessfully challenged The Bro Godz (Colton Cage & Dustin Jackson) for the OVW Southern Tag Team Championships. On August 23, Bradley was defeated by Jax Dane in the first round of the Grand Tournament.

On July 31, 2019, Bradley won a gauntlet match to become the new OVW Television Champion. Three days later, he and Cash Flo defeated Big Zo & Maximus Khan to become the new OVW Southern Tag Team Champions, thus making Bradley a double champion. On August 21, 2019, Bradley would lose the OVW Television Championship to Maximus Khan in a Gauntlet match. On November 24, 2020, Bradley was part of a Ten Man Elimination tag team match in which his team was victorious.

=== Pro Wrestling Noah (2018) ===
On January 6, 2018, at the Korakuen Hall in Tokyo, Jay Bradley made his debut for Pro Wrestling Noah in a singles match against Takashi Sugiura.

=== National Wrestling Alliance (2018–present) ===
On October 21, 2018, Jay Bradley wrestled at the NWA 70th Anniversary Show. On the card he lost a 4-way elimination match to qualify for the NWA National title match. The match, which also included Mike Parrow and Ricky Starks, was won by Willie Mack. On January 5, 2019, Bradley teamed with Caleb Konley losing to War Kings (Crimson and Jax Dane) in a qualifying match for the Crockett Cup. The night of the tournament, Bradley would team with Jocephus, losing a seven-team battle royal to the Wildcards (Royce Isaacs & Tom Latimer) with the winner qualifying as the last entrant for the Crockett Cup tournament. In 2021, Jay Bradley and Wrecking Ball Legursky formed the Fixers tag team and would start serving as muscle for Colby Corino. On August 28, 2022, the Fixers won a 12-team battle royal at the NWA 74th Anniversary Show to determine the inaugural NWA United States Tag Team Champions. The Fixers held the titles until January 31, 2023, when they lost the belts to The Country Gentlemen.

== Championships and accomplishments ==
- All American Wrestling
  - AAW Heavyweight Championship (1 time)
- Deep South Wrestling
  - Deep South Heavyweight Championship (3 times)
- Independent Wrestling Association Mid-South
  - IWA Mid-South Tag Team Championship (2 times) – with Ryan Boz (2) and Tirk Davis (1)
- Mid American Wrestling
  - MAW Heavyweight Championship (1 time)
- National Wrestling Alliance
  - NWA United States Tag Team Championship (1 time, inaugural) – with Wrecking Ball Legursky
- Ohio Valley Wrestling
  - OVW Heavyweight Championship (2 times)
  - OVW Television Championship (1 time)
  - OVW Southern Tag Team Championship (2 times) – with Ca$h Flo, Big Zo and Hy-Zaya (1) and Ca$h Flo, Big Zo, Hy-Zaya and Steve Michaels (1)
  - Twenty-fifth OVW Triple Crown Champion
- Pro Wrestling Illustrated
  - PWI ranked him #137 of the top 500 singles wrestlers in the PWI 500 in 2012
- Pro Wrestling Blitz
  - PWB Heavyweight Championship (1 time)
- Resistance Pro Wrestling
  - RPW Tag Team Championship (1 time) – with Mad Man Pondo
- Steel Domain Wrestling
  - SDW Heavyweight Championship (1 time)
- Total Nonstop Action Wrestling
  - TNA Gut Check winner
  - TNA Gut Check Tournament (2013)
