= Resistance Pro Wrestling =

American professional wrestling promotion

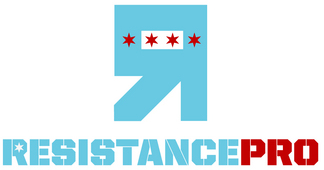
- Acronym: RPW
- Founded: 2011
- Style: Professional wrestling Sports entertainment
- Headquarters: Lockport, Illinois, U.S.
- Founder(s): Billy Corgan; Jacques Baron; Gabe Baron

Resistance Pro Wrestling (RPW) was an American professional wrestling promotion based in Lockport, Illinois. It was founded in 2011 by musician Billy Corgan and brothers Jacques and Gabe Baron. The promotion held monthly events around Chicago, attracting between 300 and 600 people per event.

== History ==
Corgan and the Baron brothers decided to form Resistance Pro in the summer of 2011. Corgan served as creative director, while the Barons handled booking, finance, marketing, merchandise, and social media.

The promotion's first show, "Black Friday", took place at the Excalibur nightclub in Chicago on November 25, 2011. ESPN reported that the inaugural event featured 22 wrestlers. The promotion adopted Sports Legacy Institute concussion-safety protocols, including regular concussion screening and a ban on chair shots to the head.

Corgan announced in November 2014 that he had left the promotion.

On May 20, 2017, Resistance Pro co-promoted Battle of Chicago with Freelance Wrestling; the card included matches for the RPW Heavyweight and Tag Team Championships.

A later promotion, The Resistance, was described in 2018 wrestling coverage as "formerly Resistance Pro". It worked with Girl Fight at an event at Spark Recreation Center in Summit in June 2018 and presented Blood Feast at Summit Park District in July 2019.

== Reality series ==
In March 2014, AMC was developing an unscripted reality series about Resistance Pro. In May, AMC greenlit an eight-episode series to follow Corgan as the promotion's creative director, and filming began in Chicago that summer. AMC canceled the project in October as it withdrew from almost all unscripted programming.

== See also ==
- List of independent wrestling promotions in the United States
