= 2023 Fangoria Chainsaw Awards =

Annual US horror film awards ceremony

29th Fangoria Chainsaw Awards
- Release poster
- Presented by: Fangoria
- Announced on: January 27, 2023
- Presented on: May 21, 2023
- Hosted by: Peaches Christ and David Dastmalchian

Highlights
- Most awards: The Black Phone (4)
- Most nominations: Nope (10)

The 29th Fangoria Chainsaw Awards is an award ceremony presented for horror films that were released in 2022. The nominees were announced on January 27, 2023. The ceremony took place on May 23, 2023.

== Winners and nominees ==
Best Wide Release	Best Limited Release
The Black Phone − Directed by Scott Derrickson; Barbarian − Directed by Zach Cregger; Nope − Directed by Jordan Peele; Pearl − Directed by Ti West; X − Directed by Ti West	Terrifier 2 − Directed by Damien Leone; Orphan: First Kill − Directed by William Brent Bell; Resurrection − Directed by Andrew Semans; Something in the Dirt − Directed by Justin Benson and Aaron Moorhead; Mad God − Directed by Phil Tippett
Best International Movie	Best Streaming Premiere
Speak No Evil − Directed by Christian Tafdrup (Denmark); Hatching − Directed by Hanna Bergholm (Finland); The Innocents − Directed by Eskil Vogt (Norway); Piggy − Directed by Carlota Pereda (Spain); Saloum − Directed by Jean Luc Herbulot (Senegal)	Prey − Directed by Dan Trachtenberg (Hulu); Fresh − Directed by Mimi Cave (Hulu); Hellbender − Directed by John Adams, Zelda Adams, and Toby Poser (Shudder); Hellraiser − Directed by David Bruckner (Hulu); A Wounded Fawn − Directed by Travis Stevens (Shudder)
Best Director	Best First Feature
Jordan Peele − Nope; Zach Cregger − Barbarian; David Cronenberg − Crimes of the Future; Chloe Okuno − Watcher; Ti West − X	Watcher − Directed by Chloe Okuno; Blood Relatives − Directed by Noah Segan; Deadstream − Directed by Vanessa Winter and Joseph Winter; The Sadness − Directed by Rob Jabbaz; We're All Going to the World's Fair − Directed by Jane Schoenbrun
Best Lead Performance	Best Supporting Performance
Mia Goth − Pearl as Pearl; Anna Diop − Nanny as Aisha; Isabelle Fuhrman − Orphan: First Kill as Esther Albright; Rebecca Hall − Resurrection as Margaret; Daniel Kaluuya − Nope as Otis "OJ" Haywood Jr.; Amber Midthunder − Prey as Naru; Maika Monroe − Watcher as Julia; Keke Palmer − Nope as Emerald "Em" Haywood; Josh Ruben − A Wounded Fawn as Bruce Ernst; Taylor Russell − Bones and All as Maren Yearly	Madeleine McGraw − The Black Phone as Gwen; Jamie Clayton − Hellraiser as The Priest; Ethan Hawke − The Black Phone The Grabber; Justin Long − Barbarian as AJ; Jenna Ortega − Scream as Tara Carpenter; Mark Rylance − Bones and All as Sully; Rachel Sennott − Bodies Bodies Bodies as Alice; Brittany Snow − X as Bobby-Lynne Parker; Kristen Stewart − Crimes of the Future as Timlin; Steven Yeun − Nope as Ricky "Jupe" Park
Best Screenplay	Best Score
The Black Phone − C. Robert Cargill and Scott Derrickson; Barbarian − Zach Cregger; The Menu − Seth Reiss and Will Tracy; Nope − Jordan Peele; Pearl − Mia Goth and Ti West	Halloween Ends − John Carpenter, Cody Carpenter and Daniel Davies; Bones and All − Trent Reznor and Atticus Ross; Men − Geoff Barrow and Ben Salisbury; Nope − Michael Abels; Pearl − Tyler Bates and Tim Williams
Best Make-Up FX	Best Creature FX
Terrifier 2 − Damien Leone; Barbarian − Lyudmil Ivanov; Crimes of the Future − Alexandra Anger and Monica Pavez/Black Spot FX; Hellraiser − Josh & Sierra Russell/RussellFX; X − Sarah Rubano & Kevin Wasner/WETA	Prey − Alec Gillis and Tom Woodruff Jr.; Hatching − Gustav Hoegen; Jurassic World Dominion − John Nolan; Nope − Guillaume Rocheron/MPC; V/H/S/99 − Troy Larson, Patrick Magee, and Mark Villalobos
Best Costume Design	Best Cinematography
Prey − Stephanie Porter; Crimes of the Future − Mayou Trikerioti; The Munsters − András Dániel Tóth and Godena-Juhász Attila; Nope − Alex Bovaird; Pearl − Malgosia Turzanska	Nope − Hoyte Van Hoytema; Men − Rob Hardy; Pearl − Eliot Rockett; X − Eliot Rockett; A Wounded Fawn − Ksusha Genenfeld
Best Documentary Feature	Best Short
Pennywise: The Story of IT − Directed by John Campopiano and Chris Griffiths; The Found Footage Phenomenon − Directed by Sarah Appleton and Phillip Escott; In Search of Darkness: Part II − Directed by David A. Weiner; Living with Chucky − Directed by Kyra Elise Gardner; This is GWAR − Directed by Scott Barber	Close Your Eyes − Directed by Andy Chen; Blink − Directed by Spenser Cohen; Guts − Directed by Chris McInroy; Meat Friend − Directed by Izzy Lee; O, Glory − Directed by Charlie Edwards-Moss and Joe Williams
Best Series	Best Non-Fiction Series or Miniseries
Stranger Things (Netflix); Cabinet of Curiosities (Netflix); Chucky (Syfy); What We Do in the Shadows (FX); Yellowjackets (Showtime)	101 Scariest Horror Movie Moments of All Time (Shudder); Cursed Films II (Shudder); The Boulet Brothers' Dragula: Titans (Shudder); Joe Bob's Ghoultide Get-Together (Shudder); Queer for Fear (Shudder)
Best Amityville	Best Kill
Amityville Christmas Vacation − Directed by Steve Rudzinski; Amityville In Space − Directed by Mark Polonia; Amityville Karen − Directed by Shawn C. Phillips; Amityville Scarecrow II − Directed by Adam Cowie; Amityville Uprising − Directed by Thomas J. Churchill	Killing Allie – Terrifier 2
Editor's Eyeball on the Future Award
Lauren Lavera as Sienna − Terrifier 2; Emily Bennett and Justin Brooks − Alone with You; Mason Thames as Finney − The Black Phone

== Presenters ==
- Clarke Wolfe and Anthony DiBlasi — presented Best Supporting Performance
- Sarah Nicklin — presented Best Short
- Mason Thames and Madeleine McGraw — presented Best First Feature
- Catherine Corcoran and Felissa Rose — presented Best Cinematography
- Tiffany Shepis — presented Best International Movie
- Jeffrey Reddick — presented Best Creature FX
- Thomas Dekker and Mink Stole — presented Best Costume Design
- Twin Temple — presented Best Score
- Kelli Maroney and Barbara Crampton — presented Best Limited Release
- Jonah Ray Rodrigues — presented Best Amityville
- Vamp — presented Best Documentary Feature
- Teri Gamble and Julia Marchese — presented Best Non-Fiction Series or Miniseries
- Misha Osherovich — presented Best Series
- Phil Nobile Jr. and Angel Melanson — presented Editor's Eyeball on the Future Award
- Biqtch Puddin' and Violet McGraw — presented Best Make-Up FX
- Elric Kane and Rebekah McKendry — presented Best Streaming Premiere
- Akela Cooper — presented Best Screenplay
- Adrienne King — presented Best Lead Performance
- Tyler Gillett and Chad Villella — presented Best Director
- Christopher Nelson — presented Best Kill
- Jamie Clayton — presented Best Wide Release
