= Yann Gael =

French-Cameroonian actor

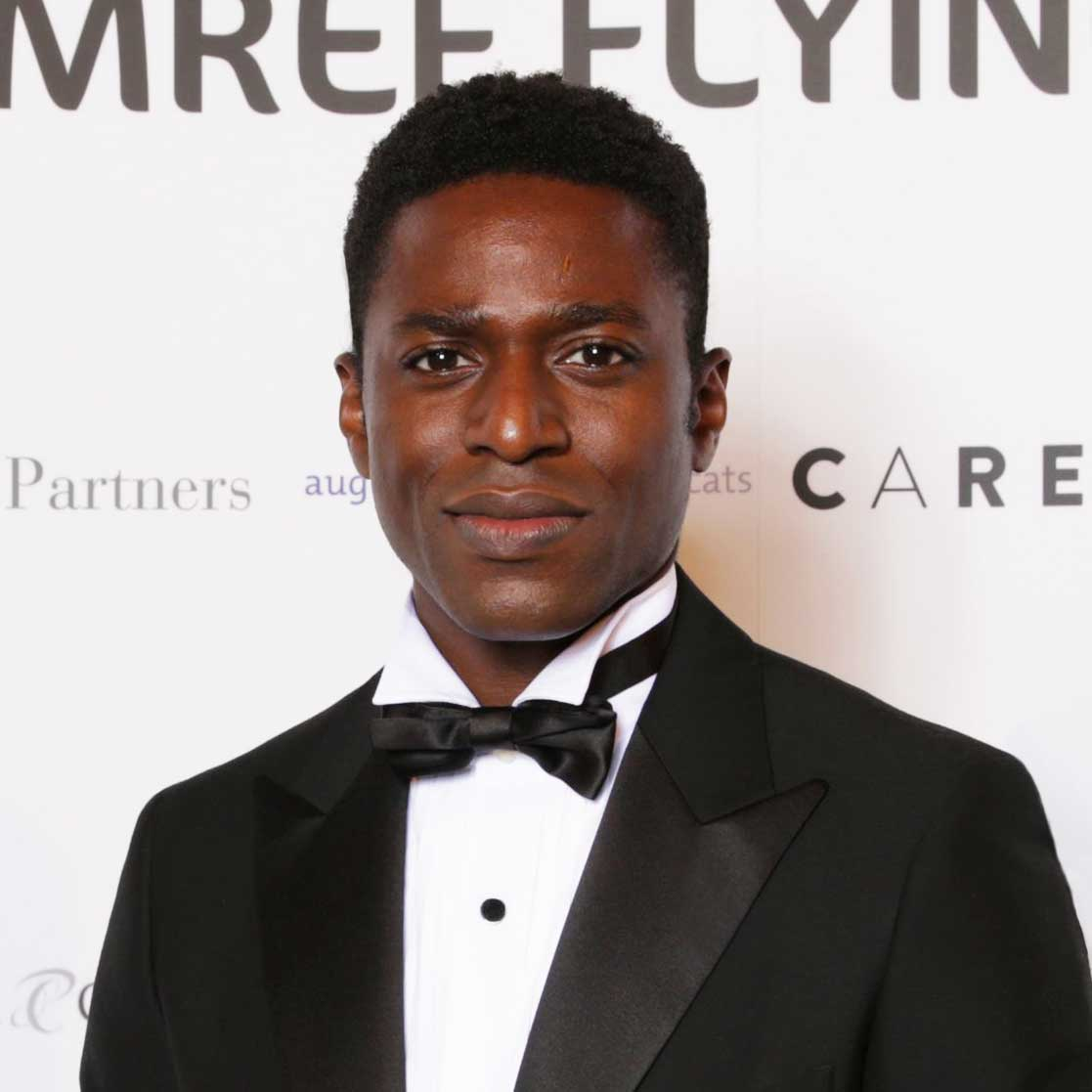
- Born: Garoua, Cameroon
- Occupation: Actor
- Notable work: 1899, Saloum, Le Rêve Français

Yann Gael is a French-Cameroonian actor and writer. He is best known for his performance in the films Le Rêve Français (2017), Saloum (2021), and Vanilla (2025), and the TV series 1899 (2022) and Néro the Assassin (2025).

== Early life and education ==
Yann Gael was born in Garoua, Cameroon.

He attended the French National Academy of Dramatic Arts (Conservatoire National Supérieur d'Art Dramatique) in Paris.

== Career ==
=== Acting ===
Gael first became known to French television audiences through roles including Duel au soleil and Le Rêve français. In Le Rêve français, a France 2 drama about migration from the French overseas departments to metropolitan France during the BUMIDOM period, he played Samuel Rénia and won the Best Male Performance award at the 2017 Festival de la Fiction TV de La Rochelle.

Gael starred in the Senegalese detective series Sakho & Mangane, created by Jean Luc Herbulot for Canal + International. In the United Kingdom, the series was released by Walter Presents on All 4 in September 2020, with UK press describing it as Walter Presents' first-ever African series. Netflix later described Sakho & Mangane as the first African French-language Netflix series.

Gael subsequently led Jean Luc Herbulot's genre film Saloum, playing Chaka, leader of the Bangui Hyenas. The film had its world premiere in the Midnight Madness section of the Toronto International Film Festival in 2021.

On 2 May 2021, Deadline Hollywood announced Gael as part of the ensemble cast of 1899, the multilingual Netflix mystery series created by Jantje Friese and Baran bo Odar. He played Jérôme, a French stowaway aboard the Kerberos. The series premiered on Netflix in November 2022 and was cancelled after one season in January 2023.

Yann plays Bastien in the 2025 British LGBT drama film directed by Joseph A. Adesunloye, Vanilla.

In 2025, Gael appeared in Rebecca Lenkiewicz's feature directorial debut Hot Milk, adapted from the novel by Deborah Levy. The film was selected for the Competition section of the 75th Berlin International Film Festival, where it screened on 14 February 2025.

He also appeared in the French Netflix historical action series Néro, the Assassin, created by Jean-Patrick Benes, Martin Douaire and Allan Mauduit. Netflix lists the series as an eight-episode 2025 action series set in France in 1504, with Pio Marmaï, Camille Razat, Olivier Gourmet, Yann Gael among others.

In 2026, he joined Aimee-Ffion Edwards in the cast of Lluest, a Welsh-language Western directed by Gareth Bryn and produced by Hannah Thomas for S4C and Sinema Cymru. He also served on the short-film jury of the 40th Cabourg Film Festival, chaired by Xavier Dolan.

=== Writing ===
On the invitation of Léonora Miano, he wrote a chapter of the book Marianne and the Black Boy (Editions Pauvert), in which he talks about black masculinity in France through his work as an actor.

== Awards ==
- 2013 : Best Male Interpretation Award of Festival de Hyères Les Palmiers for Le Retour
- 2014 : Best Male Interpretation Award of Festival Cinebanlieue for Le Retour
- 2017 : France Televisions Award for Best Male Interpretation of Festival du Court-Métrage de Clermont-Ferrand for Et toujours nous marcherons
- 2017 : Melhor Ator of Festival FestiFrance Brésil for Et toujours nous marcherons
- 2017 : Best Male Interpretation Award at Festival de la Fiction at La Rochelle 2017 for Le Rêve français
- 2018 : Special Mention at Festival Vues d'Afrique for Le Rêve français

== Filmography ==
=== Film ===
Year	Title	Director	Ref.
2018	Loro	Paolo Sorrentino	
2021	Black Soldier	Jimmy Laporal-Trésor	
2021	Saloum	Jean Luc Herbulot	
2023	Vanilla	Joseph A. Adesunloye	
2024	Gladiator II	Ridley Scott	
2025	Hot Milk	Rebecca Lenkiewicz	
2027	Lluest	Gareth Bryn	

=== Television ===
Year	Title	Director	Ref.
2014–2016	Duel Au Soleil	Olivier Guignard	
2015	Il Coraggio Di Vincere	Marco Pontecorvo	
2017	Le Rêve Français	Christian Faure	
2019	Plan Cœur	Noémie Saglio, Renaud Bertrand	
2019	Sakho and Mangane	Jean Luc Herbulot	
2022	1899	Baran bo Odar, Jantje Friese	
2025	Néro the Assassin	Allan Mauduit, Ludovic Colbeau-Justin	
2027	Stunts	Erwan Marinopoulos	

=== Music Videos ===
- Jimmy, Booba (2013)
