= James Smith (actor) =

English actor

- Occupation: Actor
- Years active: 1975–present
- Children: 3

James Smith is an English actor best known for his part as senior special adviser Glenn Cullen in the BBC political satirical comedy series The Thick of It.

== Career ==
Smith played senior special adviser Glenn Cullen all four series of the BBC's The Thick of It, from 2005 to 2012. He also featured as Michael Rodgers, Director of Diplomacy at the Foreign Office, in the film spin-off In the Loop.

In 2010 Smith played Clive in all 12 episodes of the BBC comedy Grandma's House, alongside his The Thick of It co-star Rebecca Front. Smith further collaborated with Simon Amstell when he played Graham Watkins in the 2017 mockumentary, Carnage.

He played a supporting role as Lord Carrington in the 2011 biopic about former Prime Minister Margaret Thatcher, The Iron Lady.

From 2014 to 2016 he appeared in all 13 episodes of Boomers as Trevor.

In 2018, he played the principal role of Sidney Godolphin, 1st Earl of Godolphin in Yorgos Lanthimos's film The Favourite.

In 2025, Smith has the role of Lewis in the 2025 LGBT drama film directed by Joseph A. Adesunloye, Vanilla.

== Politics and personal life ==
In October 2012, Smith compered a rally organised by the Trades Union Congress against government cuts.

Smith has three children and nine grandchildren. He was in a relationship with a woman for 30 years until she died in 1998, and later began a new relationship in the early 2010s. Smith is an amateur bridge player and drummer.
