= NWA Samhain: Part 3 =

2025 National Wrestling Alliance event

- Promotional poster featuring various NWA wrestlers
- Promotion: National Wrestling Alliance
- Date: October 17, 2025 (aired December 30th, 2025, January 6, 2026, January 13, 2026, January 20, 2026, January 27, 2026)
- City: Atlanta, Georgia
- Venue: Center Stage

Supercard chronology
← Previous; 77th Anniversary Show	Next → Crockett Cup

Samhain chronology
← Previous; 2	Next → Part IV

NWA Samhain (Note: /sɑːwɪn/ SAH-win, /ˈsaʊɪn/ SOW-in): Part 3 was a professional wrestling event produced by the National Wrestling Alliance (NWA). It was the third event in the Samhain chronology and took place on October 17, 2025, at Center Stage in Atlanta, Georgia, later airing on tape delay across several episodes of NWA Powerrr on The Roku Channel.

== Production ==
=== Background ===
NWA Samhain was originally a pay-per-view event produced by the NWA that took place on October 28, 2023. The event was notable for a segment where Father James Mitchell, the event's host, along with several people, ingested cocaine and other illicit substances. This segment allegedly soured the NWA's broadcasting deal with The CW to air NWA Powerrr and other programming on television, but NWA President William Patrick Corgan rebutted that was not the case.

On August 8, 2025, the NWA announced that Samhain: Part 3 would take place on October 17, 2025, at Center Stage in Atlanta, Georgia.

=== Storylines ===
The event featured professional wrestling matches that involve different wrestlers from pre-existing scripted feuds and storylines. Wrestlers portray heroes, villains, or less distinguishable characters in scripted events that built tension and culminate in a wrestling match or series of matches. Storylines were played out on the twenty-fifth season of the NWA's weekly series, Powerrr.

== Results ==
First episode (aired December 30th, 2025)
No.	Results	Stipulations	Times
1^{D}	Nightmare Syn (Zyon and Frank) (with Austin Idol) defeated Hunter Drake and Tyler Franks by pinfall	Empty Arena tag team match	7:47
2	Haley J defeated Sirena Veil by pinfall	Singles match	6:03
3	The Good Brothers (Doc Gallows and Karl Anderson) defeated The Hard Way (Jack Vaughn and Dalton McKenzie) by pinfall	Tag team match	6:42
4	Matt Cardona defeated Daisy Kill by pinfall	Singles match	4:05
D / – this was a dark match

Second episode (aired January 6, 2026)
No.	Results	Stipulations	Times
1	Kerry Morton defeated Damian Fenrir by pinfall	Singles match	8:37
2	El Dragón Nihan defeated Mims by pinfall	Singles match	4:53
3	The Lost (Alex Misery, Gaagz the Gymp, and Lev) (with Father James Mitchell) defeated Aron Stevens, Carson Bartholomew Drake, and Lockjaw Drake	Six-man tag team Casket match	8:16
4	Mike Mondo (c) defeated Wrecking Ball Legursky by pinfall	Singles match for the NWA National Heavyweight Championship	7:14
(c) / – the champion(s) heading into the match

Third episode (aired January 13, 2026)
No.	Results	Stipulations	Times
1	The Slimeballz (Sage Chantz and Tommy Rant) (c) (with Aron Stevens) defeated The Holy Grail (Pretty Boy Smooth and Cristiano Argento (Note: EC3 was originally meant to be Smooth's partner, but due to a knee injury, Argento took his place.)) (with EC3 and Pastor C-Lo) by pinfall	Tag team match for the NWA United States Tag Team Championship	6:57
2	Hammerstone defeated Trevor Murdoch (with Mike Knox) by pinfall	Singles match	10:10
3	The Country Gentlemen (AJ Cazana and KC Cazana) (with Joe Cazana) defeated Pretty Empowered (Kenzie Paige and Kylie Paige) (with Tommy Henry) by pinfall	No Limits intergender tag team match	9:06
(c) / – the champion(s) heading into the match

Fourth episode (aired January 20, 2026)
No.	Results	Stipulations	Times
1	Spencer Slade (with Aron Stevens) defeated Alex Taylor (c) by submission	Singles match for the NWA World Junior Heavyweight Championship	12:58
2	TV-MA (Tiffany Nieves and Valentina Rossi) (with Miss Starr) defeated The Hex (Allysin Kay and Marti Belle) by pinfall	Tag team match for the vacant NWA World Women's Tag Team Championship	8:14
3	Bryan Idol (c) defeated Rich Swann by pinfall	Singles match for the NWA World Television Championship	11:19
(c) / – the champion(s) heading into the match

Fifth episode (aired January 27, 2026)
No.	Results	Stipulations	Times
1	The Immortals (Kratos and Odinson) (c) defeated Blunt Force Trauma (Carnage and Damage) by pinfall	Tag team match for the NWA World Tag Team Championship	8:43
2	Natalia Markova (c) defeated Shotzi Blackheart by pinfall	Singles match for the NWA World Women's Championship	6:30
3	Silas Mason (c) defeated Matt Cardona (Note: Thom Latimer was originally meant to be Mason's opponent but was attacked by Cardona before the match. Cardona then took his place as he was promised an NWA Worlds Heavyweight Championship match by NWA President William Patrick Corgan the next time he was "in the ring.") by technical submission	Peachtree Street Fight for the NWA Worlds Heavyweight Championship	14:38
(c) / – the champion(s) heading into the match

== See also ==
- 2025 in professional wrestling
