= NWA Samhain: Part IV =

2026 National Wrestling Alliance event

- Promotional poster featuring NWA World's Heavyweight Champion "Thrillbilly" Silas Mason
- Promotion: National Wrestling Alliance
- Date: September 27, 2026
- City: Milwaukee, Wisconsin
- Venue: Turner Hall Ballroom
- Tagline: Thrill...or be Thrilled!

Supercard chronology
← Previous; EmPowerrr	Next → Gigawar

Samhain chronology
← Previous; Part 3	Next → —

NWA Samhain: Part IV is an upcoming professional wrestling event produced by the National Wrestling Alliance (NWA). It will be the fourth event in the Samhain chronology and will take place on September 27, 2026, at the Turner Hall Ballroom in Milwaukee, Wisconsin, and is expected to air on tape delay across several episodes of NWA Powerrr on Comet. The event will also honor WCW Hall of Famer and former NWA United States Television Champion Reggie "The Crusher" Lisowski, who is known as "The Man Who Made Milwaukee Famous".

== Production ==
=== Background ===
NWA Samhain was originally a pay-per-view event produced by the NWA that took place on October 28, 2023. The event was notable for a segment where Father James Mitchell, the event's host, along with several people, ingested cocaine and other illicit substances. This segment allegedly soured the NWA's broadcasting deal with The CW to air NWA Powerrr and other programming on television, but NWA President William Patrick Corgan rebutted that was not the case.

=== Storylines ===
The event featured professional wrestling matches that involve different wrestlers from pre-existing scripted feuds and storylines. Wrestlers portray heroes, villains, or less distinguishable characters in scripted events that built tension and culminate in a wrestling match or series of matches. Storylines were played out on the twenty-fifth season of the NWA's weekly series, Powerrr.

At NWA 78, "Thrillbilly" Silas Mason defended the NWA World's Heavyweight Championship against Carson Drake. During the match, the two would end up on the outside, where Drake hit Mason with a neckbreaker. However, Drake appeared to sustain an injury and was unable to get up, with the referee awarding Mason the win via stoppage. On September 18, the NWA announced a rematch between the two for Samhain: Part IV.

== Matches ==
No.	Matches*	Stipulations
1	"Thrillbilly" Silas Mason (c) vs. Carson Drake (with Aron Stevens)	Singles match for the NWA World's Heavyweight Championship
2	Tiffany Nieves (c) (with Miss Starr, Gretta, and Shamar Amor) vs. Natalia Markova	Singles match for the NWA World Women's Championship
3	Bryan Idol (c) vs. Thom Latimer	Singles match for the NWA National Heavyweight Championship
4	Kerry Morton vs. Colby Corino	Singles match
5	Pretty Boy Smooth (with Pastor C-Lo) vs. Da Pope	Singles match
6	Sirena Veil (c) vs. TBD	Singles match for the NWA World Women's Television Championship
7	Alex Misery (c) (with Brandon McCord) vs. TBD	Singles match for the NWA World Television Championship
8	The Hardway (Jack Vaughn and Dalton McKenzie) (c) vs. TBD	Tag team match for the NWA United States Tag Team Championship
9	Hayden Backlund (c) vs. TBD	Singles match for the NWA World Junior Heavyweight Championship
(c) / – the champion(s) heading into the match; *Card subject to change
