= Vanilla (2025 British film) =

2025 British film

- Directed by: Joseph A. Adesunloye
- Written by: Joseph A. Adesunloye; Gabriel Winter
- Starring: Yann Gael; Gabriel Winter
- Cinematography: Claudio Napoli
- Edited by: Philip Brereton
- Music by: Ros Gilman
- Production company: Dreamcoat Films
- Distributed by: The Open Reel; Dark Star Pictures
- Release date: 2025
- Running time: 76 minutes
- Country: United Kingdom

Vanilla is a 2025 British LGBT romantic drama film directed by Joseph A. Adesunloye, starring Yann Gael and Gabriel Winter in the lead roles.

== Synopsis ==
Matt and Bastien are an interracial gay couple attempting to repair their relationship while on holiday in Barcelona, Spain, celebrating their third anniversary. Bastien’s infidelity months earlier has left lingering resentment and emotional distance. During the trip, Florent, a gay English tour guide, develops an interest in Bastien, further testing the fragile bond between the two men.

== Cast ==
- Yann Gael as Bastien
- Gabriel Winter as Matt
- Jack Hamilton as Florent
- James Smith as Lewis
- Desislav Gausa Moreno as Young Skater

== Production ==
Vanilla is directed by British Nigerian filmmaker Joseph A. Adesunloye, and produced through his company Dreamcoat Films. It was written by Adesunloye and Gabriel Winter.

Cinematography was by Claudio Napoli, and the film was edited by Philip Brereton. The score was composed by Ros Gilman.

The film is 76 minutes long.

Vanilla was selected for First Look at the Locarno Film Festival in Switzerland in August 2023. after which international sales agency The Open Reel acquired international distribution rights to the film.

== Release ==
North American distribution company Dark Star Pictures released the film digitally in the United States.

== Reception ==
Tyler Geis of Video Librarian website believes that the film is worthy of collection by public and academic libraries. They give the film 3.5 out of 5 stars, writing that the film "distinguishes itself in the LGBTQ+ relationship drama genre through its raw emotional honesty and minimalistic storytelling. Rather than relying on grand gestures or melodrama, director Joseph Adesunloye focuses tightly on the intimate, day-to-day unraveling of a couple's bond".
