= Brampton Manor Academy =

Location
- Roman Road, East Ham; London, E6 3SQ; England; 51.5223°N 0.0420°E

Information
- Former name: Brampton Manor School
- Type: Academy
- Motto: Success through effort and determination
- Local authority: Newham London Borough Council
- Trust: Brampton Manor Trust
- Department for Education URN: 136669 Tables
- Ofsted: Reports
- Executive Principal: Dayo Olukoshi
- Gender: Mixed
- Age range: 11–19
- Enrolment: 2,880 (2025)
- Capacity: 2,046
- Colour: Blue 🟦
- Website: www.bramptonmanor.org
- Trust UID= 2413

Brampton Manor Academy (formerly Brampton Manor School) is an 11–19 mixed, secondary school and selective sixth form with academy status in East Ham, London, England. It is the second largest school in the London Borough of Newham. In 2019, 41 of its students were offered Oxbridge places; by 2022, this had reached 85 - one of the highest for any state school in the United Kingdom. The sixth form is particularly noted for its academic excellence, with a majority of students from Black and Asian backgrounds and a significant number qualifying for free school meals.

== History ==
Brampton Manor was built on the current site between 1957 and 1962. It was originally divided into a girls' school, taking senior students formerly at Brampton (now Brampton Primary School), and a boys' school, taking senior students formerly at Central Park. The two wings had separate numbering systems, with the west wing featuring classrooms prefixed with W, and the east wing featuring classrooms indexed numerically.

Control of the school passed from the County Borough of East Ham to the London Borough of Newham on the creation of that authority in 1965. It converted to an academy in 2011.

== Buildings ==
In 2019 the school expanded from 10 forms of entry (10fe) to (14fe).

The school's former purpose-built sixth form centre opened in September 2012.

=== Renovation projects ===
There have been extensive renovations of the school in since the school became an academy in 2011. A new sports hall was built and the old sports hall has been turned into a drama studio with a theatre at the front as Brampton Manor is now a specialist performing arts academy. There is also a new Media/Art suite, with a chill out area and media rooms for both performing, recording and dance use. In 2019 new accommodation has been started in a 5,339 sqm stand alone block for the incoming Year 7 students. This is alongside an expanded sixth form centre (871 sqm). The catering facilities have been expanded to deal with the growing student population.

== Results ==
The school was rated "outstanding" in its two most recent Ofsted inspections, which took place in 2012 and 2018.

In the 2018 Department for Education school league tables, Brampton Manor Academy ranked the highest achieving school in Newham at GCSE, with a Progress 8 score of 1.15, an Attainment 8 score of 59.2, 86% of students entering Ebacc, and an Ebacc Average Point Score of 5.25. The school also achieves outstanding A-Level results. In 2017, the school achieved a progress score at A-level of 0.63, the highest in Newham.

== Notable Alumni ==
- Ravi Bopara, professional cricketer for England and Essex.
- Jade Ewen, finalist performer at Eurovision 2009 and member of Sugababes
- Ghetts, grime music artist
- Leah Harvey, stage and screen actor.
- Lee Hodges, professional footballer
- Rob May, musician and record producer
- Shayden Morris, professional footballer for Aberdeen F.C.
- Dudley O'Shaughnessy, model and actor
- Dominic Poleon, Professional footballer for Bradford City A.F.C.
- Rob Whiteman, chief executive of CIPFA
- Danny Woodards, professional footballer

== See also ==
- Langdon Academy
