= Boomers (TV series) =

British television sitcom

- Genre: Comedy
- Created by: Richard Pinto
- Written by: Richard Pinto
- Directed by: Adam Miller
- Starring: Philip Jackson; Alison Steadman; Russ Abbot; Stephanie Beacham; June Whitfield; James Smith; Paula Wilcox
- Theme music composer: Smokey Robinson and The Miracles
- Opening theme: "Tears of a Clown"
- Country of origin: United Kingdom
- Original language: English
- No. of series: 2
- No. of episodes: 13

Production
- Executive producers: Jimmy Mulville; Shane Allen; Gregor Sharp
- Producer: Paul Schlesinger
- Running time: 30 minutes
- Production company: Hat Trick Productions

Original release
- Network: BBC One; BBC One HD
- Release: 15 August 2014 – 29 April 2016

Boomers is a British television sitcom that was first broadcast on BBC One on 15 August 2014. The show was originally titled Grey Mates but was changed to Boomers in June 2014. Spanning two series and a special, it follows the ups and downs of three late middle-aged, recently retired (or due to retire) couples who live in Thurnemouth, 'Norfolk's only west-facing resort'. The series was written by Richard Pinto, directed by Adam Miller and made by Hat Trick Productions. Paul Schlesinger is the producer and Jimmy Mulville is the executive producer for Hat Trick Productions.

== Cast ==
- Russ Abbot as John
- Stephanie Beacham as Maureen
- Philip Jackson as Alan
- James Smith as Trevor
- Alison Steadman as Joyce
- June Whitfield as Joan
- Paula Wilcox as Carol

== Production ==
In September 2013, it was announced that Hat Trick Productions was recording a pilot of Boomers, then titled Grey Mates. The non-broadcast pilot was filmed in Hunstanton in northwest Norfolk and Herne Bay as well as the studio in September 2013.

Boomers, which was announced by Charlotte Moore, went into production in spring 2014. Filming began in May 2014.

The exteriors for the series were filmed in Herne Bay in Kent.

The theme tune is "The Tears of a Clown" which accompanies the opening titles.

Filming for subsequent episodes took place in September 2015. A special was broadcast on BBC One on 23 December 2015, followed by a six-part second series beginning on 25 March 2016.

== Episodes ==
=== Series 1 (2014) ===
The first series consists of six episodes and began airing on BBC One on 15 August 2014.

No.	Title	Directed by	Written by	Original release date	Viewers (millions)
1	"Episode One"	Adam Miller	Richard Pinto	15 August 2014	5.324
A funeral is approaching, and Alan is particularly looking forward to it as his old friend Mick is attending, from his retirement home in Spain. No one else is quite so pleased.
2	"Episode Two"	Adam Miller	Richard Pinto	22 August 2014	4.25
Carol and Trevor celebrate their 40th wedding anniversary. With Joyce having organised a gastro-pub lunch, it looks like it could be a party to remember.
3	"Episode Three"	Adam Miller	Richard Pinto	29 August 2014	3.01†
Thurnemouth Day comes once a year; it's when the town puts on its party hat and celebrates its history.
4	"Episode Four"	Adam Miller	Richard Pinto	5 September 2014	2.86†
Joyce is retiring and Alan has invited all of their friends round to the house for a party.
5	"Episode Five"	Adam Miller	Richard Pinto	12 September 2014	2.65†
6	"Episode Six"	Adam Miller	Richard Pinto	19 September 2014	2.85†
Everyone goes on a holiday to a seaside resort but Joyce doesn't like it because they go every year. Joyce decides to go dancing with Carol because she is worried, when Carol dances with a man that she knows from the past Joyce is concerned, it is reviled that the man in question is gay and the dance is platonic, Joyce dances with him and breaks his arm. Meanwhile, the men go rock climbing.

- † - Marks the overnight ratings, used because the show is out of the Top 30 on BARB's listings for those weeks.

=== Christmas Special (2015) ===
The Christmas Special aired on BBC One on 23 December 2015. (Source: British Comedy Guide)

No.	Title	Directed by	Written by	Original release date	Viewers (millions)
1	"Christmas Special"	Adam Miller	Richard Pinto	23 December 2015	TBA
It's Christmas Eve, and the three couples have reached the Eurotunnel in Calais, returning from a long weekend visiting the Christmas markets in Cologne.

=== Series 2 (2016) ===
The second series consists of six episodes and began airing on BBC One on 25 March 2016. (Source: British Comedy Guide)

No.	Title	Directed by	Written by	Original release date	Viewers (millions)
1 (7)	"Camping"	Adam Miller	Richard Pinto	25 March 2016	4.00
Celebrating Trevor's birthday and anniversary on a campsite, Joyce, Maureen and Carol strike up an interesting new friendship with a strapping young Nordic man.
2 (8)	"Matt & Seb"	Adam Miller	Richard Pinto	1 April 2016	4.01
New couple Matt and Seb are having a housewarming party. John's keeping a low profile as he thinks he's catnip to gay men and Trevor's got performance anxiety as his and Carol's period of sexual lent draws to a close.
3 (9)	"Naming Ceremony"	Adam Miller	Richard Pinto	8 April 2016	TBA
Joyce steals her own granddaughter at her Naming Ceremony for essential Facebook updates, while Carol attempts to publish her own version of Fifty Shades of Grey (and Trevor frets because it might be based on personal experience).
4 (10)	"Mick's Return"	Adam Miller	Richard Pinto	15 April 2016	TBA
Mick returns from his Spanish paradise minus his young Lithuanian wife and has a surprise in store for Joyce.
5 (11)	"Murder Mystery"	Adam Miller	Richard Pinto	22 April 2016	TBA
It's John's birthday and he's decided to do something different this year - a Murder Mystery Party.
6 (12)	"Wedding"	Adam Miller	Richard Pinto	29 April 2016	TBA
Maureen's mum Joan shocks everyone with a surprise announcement that proves there's still life in the old dog yet!

== DVD release ==
The complete first series of Boomers was released on DVD on 22 September 2014.
