= Kross Fire Wrestling =

Professional wrestling promotion

- Acronym: KFW; NWA KFW
- Founded: 2006
- Style: Professional wrestling
- Headquarters: Sevierville, Tennessee
- Founder(s): Tommy Henry; Isaac Cain
- Owner(s): Kenzie Henry; Kylie Henry

Kross Fire Wrestling (KFW), also known as NWA Kross Fire, is a professional wrestling promotion owned by Kenzie and Kylie Henry better known by their ring names Kenzie and Kylie Paige. It is affiliated with the National Wrestling Alliance (NWA) and serves as a territory for the organization.

== History ==
Kross Fire Wrestling logo used from 2021 to 2024

Kross Fire Wrestling logo used in 2024

The promotion was first established in 2006 as an independent promotion. On October 21, 2022 during the Black Harvest event, Juventud Guerrera won the KFW Championship after defeating Colby Corino. On April 29, 2024, the NWA announced that KFW would become a territory in the NWA's territory system. On June 1, 2024 during the Back to the Territories tapings for NWA Powerrr, Juventud Guerrera defended the KFW Championship against Zyon. On July 19, 2024, KFW owner Kenzie Paige signed a multi-year contract with the NWA. On July 13, 2026, the NWA announced that they would be teaming up with KFW to revive the EmPowerrr event which is scheduled to take place on August 28, 2026 in Sevierville, Tennessee.

== Championships ==
Championship	Current champion(s)	Date won	Days held	Event	Location	Notes
KFW Championship	Tyler Franks	May 8, 2026	146+	The Reset	Sevierville, Tennessee	
KFW Women's Championship	Lizzy Cassidy	May 8, 2026	146+	The Reset	Sevierville, Tennessee	
KFW Tag Team Championship	Chase Stevens and Shane Williams	May 8, 2026	146+	The Reset	Sevierville, Tennessee	
