= Amityville Christmas Vacation =

- Blu-ray cover
- Directed by: Steve Rudzinski
- Written by: Bill Murphy; Steve Rudzinski
- Based on: The Amityville Horror
- Starring: Aleen Isley; Garrett Hunter; Autumn Ivy
- Cinematography: Scott Lewis; Steve Rudzinski
- Edited by: Steve Rudzinski
- Music by: Mike Trebilcock
- Release date: September 19, 2022
- Running time: 55 minutes
- Country: United States
- Language: English

Amityville Christmas Vacation is a 2022 comedy horror film that was directed by Steve Rudzinski, based on a script he co-wrote with Bill Murphy. The film is one of several films that uses the title of Amityville, but is not an official part of the franchise based on the 1977 book The Amityville Horror or any of the other media that shares the name Amityville.

== Synopsis ==
The film opens with an unspecified person stating that they need a human sacrifice to keep evil forces at bay. They have decided to sacrifice Wally Griswold after seeing an article about him performing a heroic feat in the news, justifying their actions by saying that all cops are bastards and that Wally is likely no different. The movie then cuts to Wally, who has just received a letter stating that he has won a free stay at a bed and breakfast located in Amityville, New York. Despite never entering any such contest, Wally packs his bags and travels to the home, where he's greeted by the owner, Samantha. She helps him settle in, deliberately hiding that the home is haunted by a murderous ghost, Jessica.

As Christmas Eve progresses, Wally and Jessica fall in love with one another. This raises the ire of Jessica's boss, as she works for a ghost agency whose offerings include murder. The two must also contend with a ghost hunter who traps Jessica. Ultimately the two overcome these obstacles and Jessica is brought back to life so she and Wally can stay together.

== Cast ==
- Steve Rudzinski as Wally Griswold
- Aleen Isley as Jessica
- Garrett Hunter as Vincent Phillip II
- Autumn Ivy as Zelda
- Scott Lewis as Creighton Spool
- Marci Leigh as Samantha

== Release ==
Amityville Christmas Vacation was released to video on demand platforms in late 2022. A trailer for the film was released in December of that same year; Collider reacted to the trailer, writing that "hopefully, this film is as funny as the ridiculous premise sounds and not as cringeworthy as the trailer looks."

== Reception ==
Bloody Disgusting praised the film as being "amusingly self-aware" while also stating that "Like most comedies, audience mileage will vary depending on their tolerance for low-brow jokes." Horror Society was also positive in their review, citing the acting as a highlight.

=== Awards ===
- Fangoria Chainsaw Award for Best Amityville (2023, won)
