= EmPowerrr (2026) =

2026 National Wrestling Alliance event

- Promotional poster featuring Pretty Empowered (Kenzie Paige and Kylie Paige)
- Promotion(s): National Wrestling Alliance; Kross Fire Wrestling
- Date: August 28, 2026
- City: Sevierville, Tennessee
- Venue: Sevierville Civic Center

Supercard chronology
← Previous; 78th Anniversary Show	Next → Samhain: Part IV

EmPowerrr chronology
← Previous; 2021	Next → —

The 2026 EmPowerrr was a professional wrestling livestreaming event co-produced by the National Wrestling Alliance (NWA) and territory promotion Kross Fire Wrestling (KFW). The event took place on August 28, 2026, at the Sevierville Civic Center in Sevierville, Tennessee and was streamed live on YouTube. This was the second EmPowerrr event since the inaugural 2021 event five years prior and the first NWA live event to air in full since Samhain nearly three years prior.

== Production ==
=== Background ===
On August 28, 2021, the NWA held the inaugural EmPowerrr event at the Chase Park Plaza Hotel in St. Louis, Missouri. The event aired on pay-per-view on FITE TV, currently Triller TV, and was the NWA's first all-women's professional wrestling event, consisting solely of matches in their women's division. The card also featured wrestlers from partner promotions at the time such as All Elite Wrestling (AEW), Impact Wrestling (now Total Nonstop Action Wrestling (TNA)), and Lucha Libre AAA Worldwide (AAA); the event was headlined by the inaugural NWA Women's Invitational Cup Gauntlet match won by Chelsea Green.

On April 29, 2024, the NWA announced that Kross Fire Wrestling, an East Tennessee-based independent promotion founded by Kenzie and Kylie Paige's father Tommy Henry and owned by the sisters, would become a territory in the NWA's territory system. On July 19, 2024, Kenzie Paige signed a multi-year exclusive contract with the NWA.

On July 13, 2026, the NWA announced that they would be teaming up with KFW to revive the EmPowerrr event, which will to take place on August 28, 2026, at the Sevierville Civic Center in Sevierville, Tennessee. It would be streamed live on YouTube, making it the first NWA live event to air in full since 2023.

=== Storylines ===
EmPowerrr featured professional wrestling matches that involves different wrestlers from pre-existing scripted feuds and storylines. Wrestlers portrayed villains, heroes, or less distinguishable characters in scripted events that built tension and culminated in a wrestling match or series of matches. Storylines were produced on the National Wrestling Alliance and Kross Fire Wrestling's various events and on the twenty-eighth season of the NWA's television show, Powerrr.

== Results ==
No.	Results	Stipulations	Times
1	TVMA (Tiffany Nieves and Gretta) (with Shamar Amor) defeated Alice Crowley and Lizzy Cassidy (with Paige Collett) by pinfall	Tag team match	3:28
2	Gisele Shaw (c) defeated Mackenzie Morgan by pinfall	Singles match for the NWA World Women's Television Championship	6:48
3	Liviyah defeated Clara Carter by pinfall	Singles match	7:19
4	Sirena Veil and Paige Collett defeated Corrine Joy and Alexandra Quinn by pinfall	Tag team match	7:23
5	Carson Drake (with Aaron Stevens) defeated Effy by pinfall	Singles match	11:41
6	The Country Gentlemen (AJ Cazana and KC Cazana) (Men's) (with Joe Cazana) defeated Pretty Empowered (Kenzie Paige and Kylie Paige) (Women's) (with Tommy Henry) by pinfall	Intergender champions vs. champions tag team match	14:02
7	Tiffany Nieves (c) (with Gretta and Shamar Amor) defeated Alice Crowley (with Paige Collett) by pinfall	Singles match for the NWA World Women's Championship	9:35
(c) / – the champion(s) heading into the match
