= Dudley O'Shaughnessy =

British boxer, model, and actor

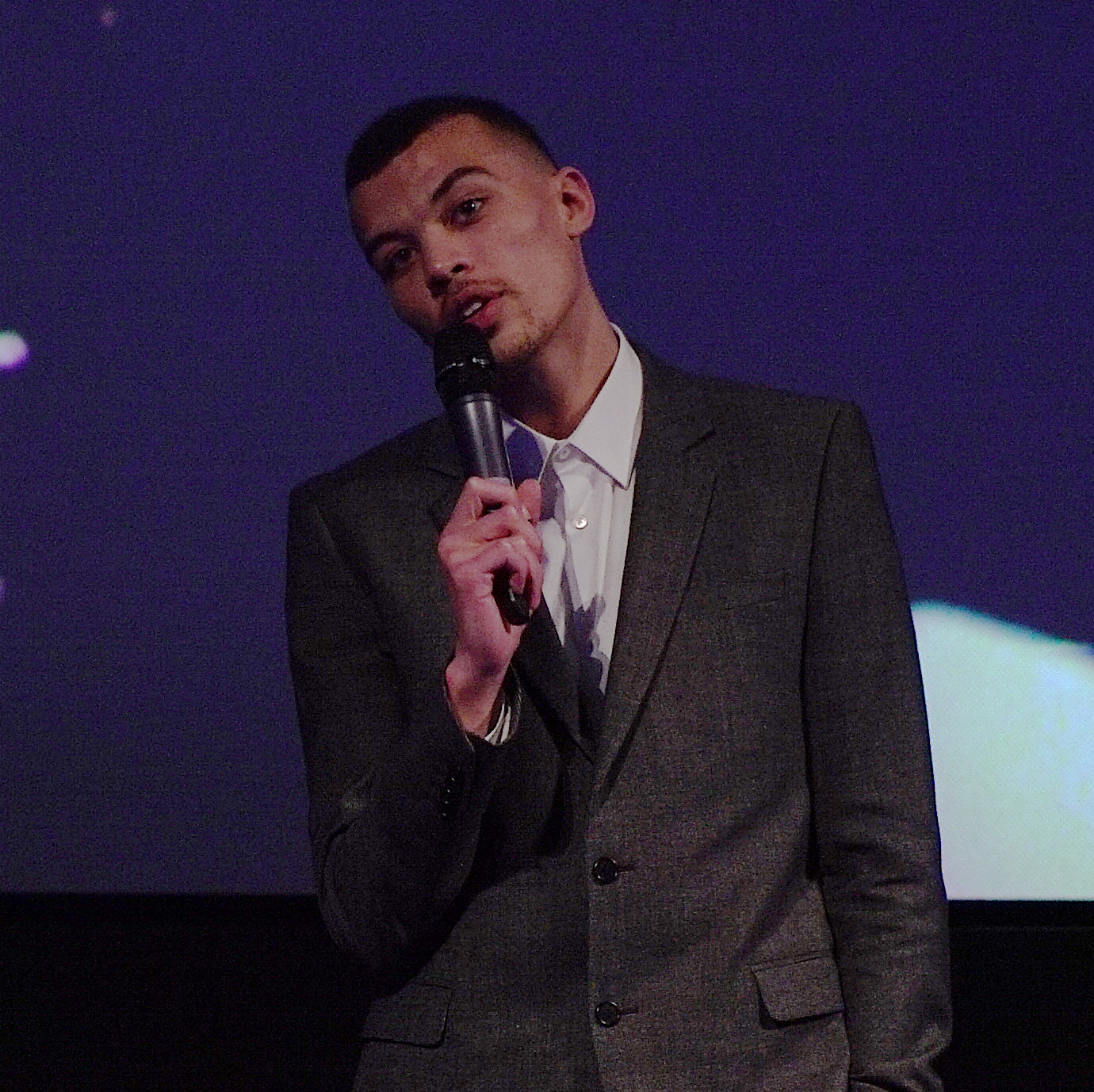
- O'Shaughnessy in 2016
- Born: London, England
- Occupations: Boxer; actor; model

Dudley O'Shaughnessy is a British former amateur boxer, actor, and model.

== Early life and education ==
Dudley O'Shaughnessy was born in East London to a Saint Lucian father with Afro-Caribbean and Irish heritage and an English mother.

He attended school at Brampton Manor Academy in East Ham.

== Career ==
=== Boxing ===
O'Shaughnessy (also known as "Lil Saint") was an amateur boxer from the age of nine, after being introduced to the sport by his father, who himself was a former boxer. O'Shaughnessy lost a fight to Northern Irish boxer Matthew Johnston, who trained with the Abbey Boxing Club.

He became the British amateur welterweight champion in 2010, after being the runner-up in 2009. However, he was not selected by the British Olympic Association.

=== Modelling ===
At the age of 19, O'Shaughnessy was scouted by a local modelling agency, and then moved to NEXT Model Management. He then began to focus on modelling.

=== Acting ===
In 2011, O'Shaughnessy was chosen to star in the music video for "We Found Love" by Rihanna. He has featured in some of the works by Oswald Boateng, Fred Perry, and Stone Island (where he featured in a short film portraying his aspiration to be an Olympic boxer). He appeared on the cover of fashion magazines as well as featuring in the editorial by Bullett Magazine, alongside Vogue cover girl Valerie van der Graaf.

In 2012, he appeared on the runway for designers such as Jeremy Scott, fall 2012 New York City, Timo Welliand's 2012 fall ready to wear collection and has walked for Michael Michalsky at the Berlin Fashion Week.

In January 2013, O'Shaughnessy was cast in the UK's United Colors of Benetton ad campaign. In 2014, he appeared in an episode of the detective drama Suspects, playing "Wakim Ahmed".

In 2016, O'Shaughnessy had his first lead role in a feature film, in Joseph A Adesunloye's White Colour Black.

In 2024, O'Shaughnessy portrayed Gabriel in the Netflix film Mary.

== Recognition and awards ==
O'Shaughnessy was awarded the 2012 Male Model of the year by ARISE magazine.

He was nominated in the Best Newcomer category at BFI London Film Festival for his role in White Colour Black.
