= We Found Love (music video) =

2011 film by Melina Matsoukas

- A screenshot of Rihanna vomiting pink and white streamers
- Directed by: Melina Matsoukas
- Produced by: Juliette Larthe; Ben Sullivan; Prettybird (co-producer); Candice Ouaknine (executive producer)
- Starring: Rihanna; Dudley O'Shaughnessy; Calvin Harris; Agyness Deyn (voice only)
- Narrated by: Agyness Deyn
- Edited by: Jeff Selis
- Music by: Rihanna
- Production companies: Def Jam; SRP
- Distributed by: Universal Music and Video Distribution
- Release dates: October 19, 2011 (premiere); October 22, 2011 (download)
- Running time: 4:36
- Country: United States
- Language: English

The music video for Barbadian singer Rihanna's 2011 single "We Found Love" was directed by Melina Matsoukas. It was filmed on September 26–28, 2011, in the New Lodge area of Belfast and Bangor, County Down, Northern Ireland. People driving around the location of the set informed BBC that traffic in the area was congested as drivers wanted to see the singer. The video premiered on October 19, 2011, and was made available to download digitally three days later on October 22. As of April 2026, the video has amassed over 1.1 billion views on YouTube.

The video begins with a monologue given by fashion model Agyness Deyn. Scenes of Rihanna with her romantic interest (Dudley O'Shaughnessy) in both love and hate scenarios intersperse, as they experience mounting difficulties in their relationship. After enduring the overwhelming effects of recreational drugs and physical violence, she finds her boyfriend unconscious on the floor of his apartment, and leaves him, having had enough of the relationship. Images of the song's producer and featured artist Calvin Harris appear in outdoor DJ scenes, while the video has regular references to popular culture, such as themes of films and content of other singers' videos.

Many critics noted that the video resembled a short film, and compared it to the films Trainspotting and Requiem for a Dream. Some critics also compared the thematic content to those of Rihanna's videos for "S&M" and "Man Down". Despite that, the video caused much controversy among activist groups. Christian youth pastor Brandon Ward, John Colonnello and the Ulster Cancer Foundation criticized the video for Rihanna's portrayal of her character having sex while under the influence of illegal drugs and smoking heavily. Consequently, the video was banned from being shown before 10 pm on French television. It won the Grammy Award for Best Short Form Music Video and MTV's VMA for Video of the Year. The video further managed to peak at number one on the Polish Top Airplay TV Chart and the Romanian TV Airplay Chart.

== Development ==
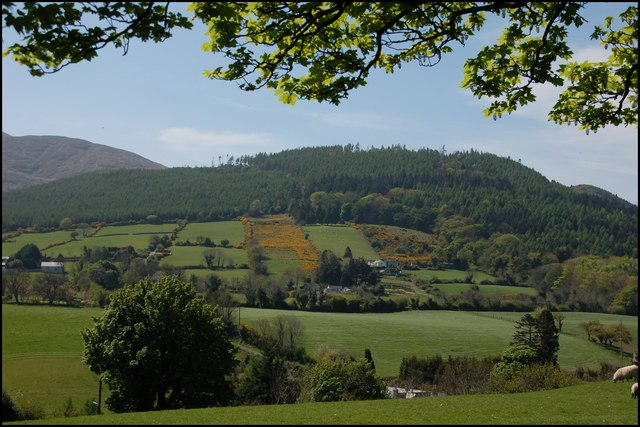
One of the video locations was a field in County Down, Northern Ireland, where recording was halted when the field's owner, Alan Graham, expressed distaste at Rihanna stripping down to her waist on his land.

The music video for "We Found Love" was shot on September 26–28, 2011, in County Down, Northern Ireland. It was filmed in a field in the town of Bangor, County Down, ahead of Rihanna's embarkment on the European leg of the Loud Tour (2011), and the New Lodge area of North Belfast. It was directed by Melina Matsoukas, who had previously directed the videos for "Rude Boy" (2010), and the controversial "S&M" (2011). During the filming, people driving around the location of the set informed the BBC that traffic in the area was congested as drivers tried to see the singer. Pictures showing Rihanna wearing a red bandana top, long flannel shirt, and "dirty denim", similar to the clothing she wore for the song's artwork, were leaked onto the internet the same day. She filmed scenes while wearing a bikini with the pattern of the US flag, and a denim vest and ripped jeans. The owner of the field, farmer and North Down Borough Council Democratic Unionist Party councillor Alan Graham, expressed distaste after seeing Rihanna topless on his field, saying: "When the filming did become to my mind unacceptable I requested the filming to stop ... it became apparent to me that the situation was becoming inappropriate and I requested them to stop and they did". On September 28, 2011, the shoot location was moved to a closed set in Titanic Quarter, Belfast where both photographers and fans were barred from watching the singer.

Extras for the shoot were not told what was expected of them until the last minute, in order to keep the content of the video as secret as possible. Regarding the video's content, Rihanna posted a message on Twitter that read: "I really can't stop thinking about this video we just shot! EASILY the BEST video I've done thus far!" Rihanna elaborated on the concept of the video: "We've never done a video like this before. This is probably one of the deepest videos I've ever done ... it's all about love and love being like a drug, you definitely get that from this." The male love interest in the video is Dudley O'Shaughnessy, a model and former boxer. Upon the release of the video, Matsoukas explained the content of the video in an interview with MTV:

We love, obviously, to do provocative imagery ... we always try to definitely push the limits ... I think because, in the end, it's not really at all about domestic violence. It's really just about it being toxic, and they're on this drug trip and that definitely plays a part, but I think it's also about being triumphant over those weaknesses, and she leaves him. It's not trying to glorify that type of relationship. The bad parts of it, that's what you don't want. In the end, her leaving, it represents her getting that out of her life. The drugs and the addiction and the toxic—that's what brings her downfall and brings a lot of harm.

The director went on to explain the content with regard to Rihanna's domestic violence case against former boyfriend Chris Brown in February 2009, saying that it is not a reenactment of what happened between Rihanna and Brown, but rather that Rihanna is acting in the video. Matsoukas said:

[The song's] totally rave-y ... and that's the feeling, just music rushing over you, and then I started thinking about drugs and addiction and love and how that's an addiction ... we've all lived the ups and downs of being in a toxic relationship. It's really about the obstacles of trying to let it go, but at the same time how great it makes you feel, so it's hard to let it go. Again, it goes back to a story that we all can relate to ... It's not Rihanna's story; it's her story in the video, and she's acting. But everybody's [as well]. Obviously, there's a lot of comparisons to her real life, and that's not at all the intention. It's just that I guess people naturally go there because art imitates life, and it's a story we all relate to and we've all experienced. Like, it's based on my life; it's based on her life; it's based on your life, like, everybody.

In an interview with Pitchfork, Matsoukas explained that she was surprised with the professional standard of Rihanna's acting. The inspiration for Rihanna acting in the video came from when Matsoukas saw the clip for "Man Down" in April 2011; the director stated that she was taken aback at how Rihanna realistically re-enacted a rape scenario. Matsoukas described the process for choosing O'Shaughnessy as the male love interest, stating that Rihanna had asked her to find a man she could "fake fuck" while filming. The director said that she telephoned a boxer her friend had told her about, and asked him to make a tape of himself using the description of how the male love interest should act. When asked if any of the video was improvised, Matsoukas revealed that she would create a scenario and then it was left to Rihanna and O'Shaughnessy to elaborate upon what the director had given them. Matsoukas jokingly said that the scene in which O'Shaughnessy draws a tattoo on Rihanna's buttock cheek was not part of the video's treatment, and that O'Shaughnessy improvised it. Upon the video's release, multiple media outlets and music critics compared the content of the video to a reenactment of Rihanna and Brown's physical altercation. When asked about this, Matsoukas clarified that the video was not linked to Brown in any circumstance, and said, "[O'Shaughnessy] doesn't even really look like Chris Brown to me."

== Synopsis ==
The video begins with a monologue by fashion model Agyness Deyn about love and heartbreak:

It's like you're screaming but no one can hear. You almost feel ashamed that someone could be that important, that without them, you feel like nothing. No one will ever understand how much it hurts. You feel hopeless, like nothing can save you. And when it's over and it's gone, you almost wish that you could have all that bad stuff back so you can have the good.

During the narration, Rihanna and her lover are depicted in both love and hate scenarios. Before the song begins to play, lightning bolts are projected onto a wall in which Rihanna stands in front of. She and her lover are depicted as enamored with each other, and enjoying activities such as fairground rides and eating in fast food restaurants. During the chorus, images of drugs, pills, and dilated pupils are shown, while brief scenes of Rihanna and her boyfriend preparing to have sex are shown.

The chorus continues and the video cuts to a scene in which Rihanna and other people dance at an outside rave; Calvin Harris features as the DJ. As the second chorus begins, Rihanna and her boyfriend are happily running amok in a supermarket, pushing each other in a shopping cart and spraying canned drinks at each other. However, they begin arguing in a car. The video then shows the couple experiencing mounting difficulties in their relationship. They eventually begin to physically abuse one another. During the final chorus, a rewind of the whole event is shown, before Rihanna is seen vomiting streamers; she is also seen unconscious on the street while her boyfriend tries to revive her. After finding the boyfriend unconscious on the floor of his apartment, Rihanna decides she has had enough of the relationship and leaves him. The video ends with Rihanna curled up in the corner of a room, crying.

== Release and reception ==
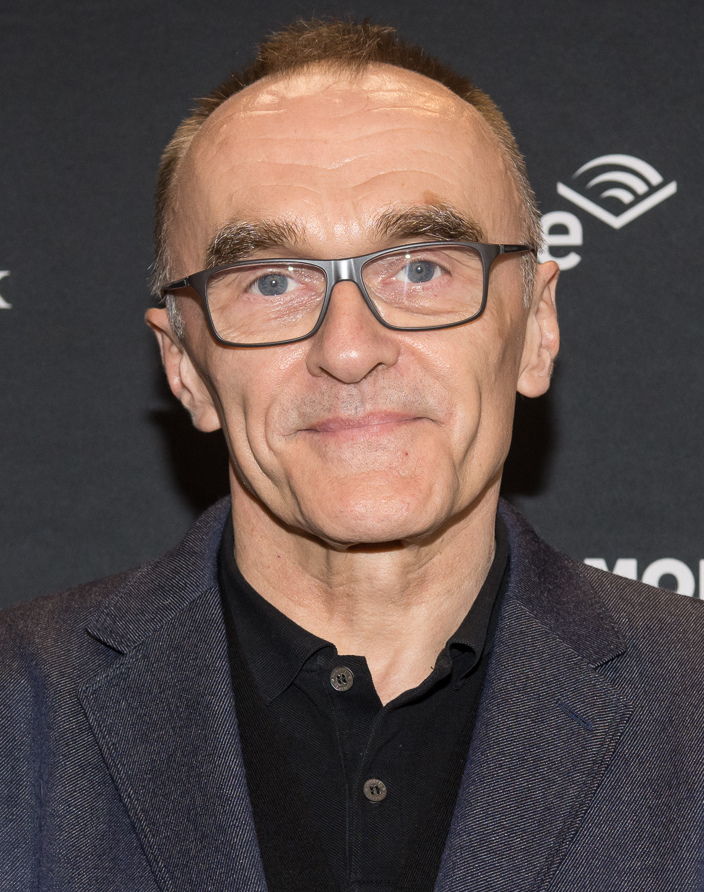
The video received multiple comparisons from various music critics to Trainspotting (1996), directed by Danny Boyle (pictured), because of its overly sexualized and violent themes, as well as the opening monologue by Agyness Deyn.

The video for "We Found Love" premiered on the website Whosay.com on October 19, 2011. Chris Coplan of Consequence of Sound praised the production of the video, noting its cinematic feel and that it shows the "ins and outs [and] ups and downs" of love. Coplan compared the video to the film Blue Valentine due to its sexualized content and a narrative that consists of a couple in a turbulent relationship. Erika Ramirez of Billboard magazine called the video artful and poignant, and noted that it shows "neon colors, explicit sex, bathtub embraces and painful arguments of the couple's world". Jocelyn Vena of MTV commented that although the song is upbeat and carefree, the video represents the antithesis, depicting "a dark look at love and substance abuse". Vena, like Coplan, noted that the song's video has a cinematic feel, calling it a "mini-movie". She compared the video to the films Trainspotting and Requiem for a Dream, with regard to its opening monologue, which Vena thought foreshadowed the video.

Matthew Perpetua of Rolling Stone wrote, "the footage looks like a remake of Trainspotting, and, ["We Found Love"] matches its thumping rave beat to footage that often looks like a remake of Trainspotting". Amanda Dobbins of New York magazine was more critical of the video; she criticized Rihanna's undressing in a farmer's field as "the least of its provocations" and listed the activities the couple partake in: "smoking, drinking, dancing on fast-food tables, dancing at raves, heavy petting, stealing groceries, drunk wheelies, and bathing while fully clothed [and] candy-colored drugs". Dobbins noted that the list of illicit and frowned upon activities may aggravate parents and committees because of the explicit nature of the video, which caused controversy for Rihanna in her videos for "S&M" and "Man Down". Charlotte Cowles of the same publication commented that the voice-over provided by Deyn at the start of the video sounded "incredibly depressing".

Leah Greenblatt of Entertainment Weekly described the video as "a Trainspotting-meets-Drugstore Cowboy portrait of wasted youth and finding love in an apparently very pharmaceutical place". Greenblatt continued her review in a more negative manner, asking if it "paint[s] a too-glamorous portrait of crazy, stupid love for her young fans? Or is it [Rihanna]'s prerogative to push the boundaries of dilated pupils, couch sex, and how many cigarettes two people can conceivably smoke simultaneously?" Jamie Lewis of the International Business Times noted that the video is likely to cause controversy among sections of the public due to the "multitude of illicit and illegal acts", and condemned the activities that the singer appeared to be partaking in, writing, "Rihanna can be seen swallowing unmarked pills, smoking what looks like marijuana, publicly stripping, stealing goods and vandalising". Lewis also wrote that Rihanna had received mixed reactions from her fans via her Twitter and Facebook feeds.

=== Accolades ===
The video was included on many lists of the best music videos of 2011. Out of 50 videos, "We Found Love" ranked at number 21 on NME's Best Music Videos of 2011. A reviewer for NME called it, "an artful mini-movie of a promo, an ode to crazy, youthful love." It ranked at number 12 out of 25 on Slant Magazine's Top 2011 Music Videos. A reviewer for Slant Magazine praised Matsoukas' directorial skills, writing, "Melina Matsoukas's video projects (literally and figuratively) the fleeting rush of both young love and drugs—and the often fatal cocktail that's produced when the two are combined." The video was included on The Guardian's 2011 list, entitled "The best pop videos of 2011". As of January 2015, Billboard named the video as the second best music video of the 2010s (so far). The video received three MTV Video Music Award nominations, including Best Pop Video, and won the award for Video of the Year. The video received the Grammy Award for Best Short Form Music Video at the 55th Annual Grammy Awards which was held on February 10, 2013 at the Staples Center, Los Angeles. In a 2025 retrospective, Billboard ranked "We Found Love" as the greatest Video of the Year winner in the history of the MTV Video Music Awards.

== Controversy ==
=== UK controversy ===
In the UK, The Rape Crisis Centre, an organization that helps victims of sexual abuse and sexual violence, criticized the video. Eileen Kelly, a representative of the group, stated that the video sends "out an inappropriate message" and told The Daily Star that the clip "is a disgrace. It sends the message that she is an object to be possessed by men, which is disturbingly what we see in real violence cases".

=== US controversy ===
The video was also criticized by Brandon Ward, a youth pastor of Oasis Christian Center in Staten Island, New York, for "damaging the moral and self-worth of young impressionable teens." Ward wrote how he thought the video affects females' sense of self-worth:

The real issue is that it moves the moral center more towards the obscene. That it becomes more normal to be more sexually promiscuous, because they are bombarded with imagery that is loaded with innuendo, and that is seen as normal, even preferred ... if girls and women find their identity and self-worth in the approval of people, they will do whatever it takes to become popular and loved. When stars like Rihanna, who blast sexuality, are thrust into the limelight, girls tend to think that is the way for them to be valuable. God tells us that we are fearfully and wonderfully made ... bearing His image. Rihanna is selling a lie.

John Colonnello, a youth pastor from Athens, Alabama, criticized Rihanna's failure as a role model for young girls and women who look up to her. Colonello said that Rihanna is promoting the importance of one's physical appearance, and unhealthy sex: "the message should be that it's about who you are on the inside and your character. That you should be honest, trustworthy, faithful, kind, loving, compassionate and more."

=== French ban ===
On November 15, 2011, the music video is banned from broadcasting in France during the day and was broadcast after 10:00 p.m. by the French audiovisual regulation with a warning (Not advised to kids under 10 years old) or (Not advised to kids under 12 years old) due to many so-called self-destructive, violent, suggestive scenes and of use of drugs and alcohol. Ulster Cancer Foundation, an anti-smoking organization, condemned Rihanna for smoking in the music video. Doreen Reegan, a spokesperson for the organization, commented on the singer's decision to include smoking as part of her promotional image, saying:

Three-quarters of adult smokers start the habit as teenagers, which is why it is so irresponsible of Rihanna to influence her young fan base in this way ... After so much hype around the filming of the video it was very disappointing to see Rihanna so blatantly smoking throughout it ... Artists such as Rihanna are held in high esteem and regarded as role models by millions of young people.

== Comparisons ==
=== Chris Brown ===
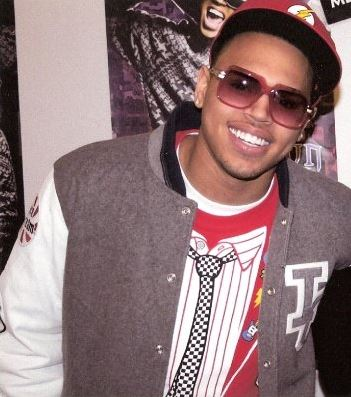
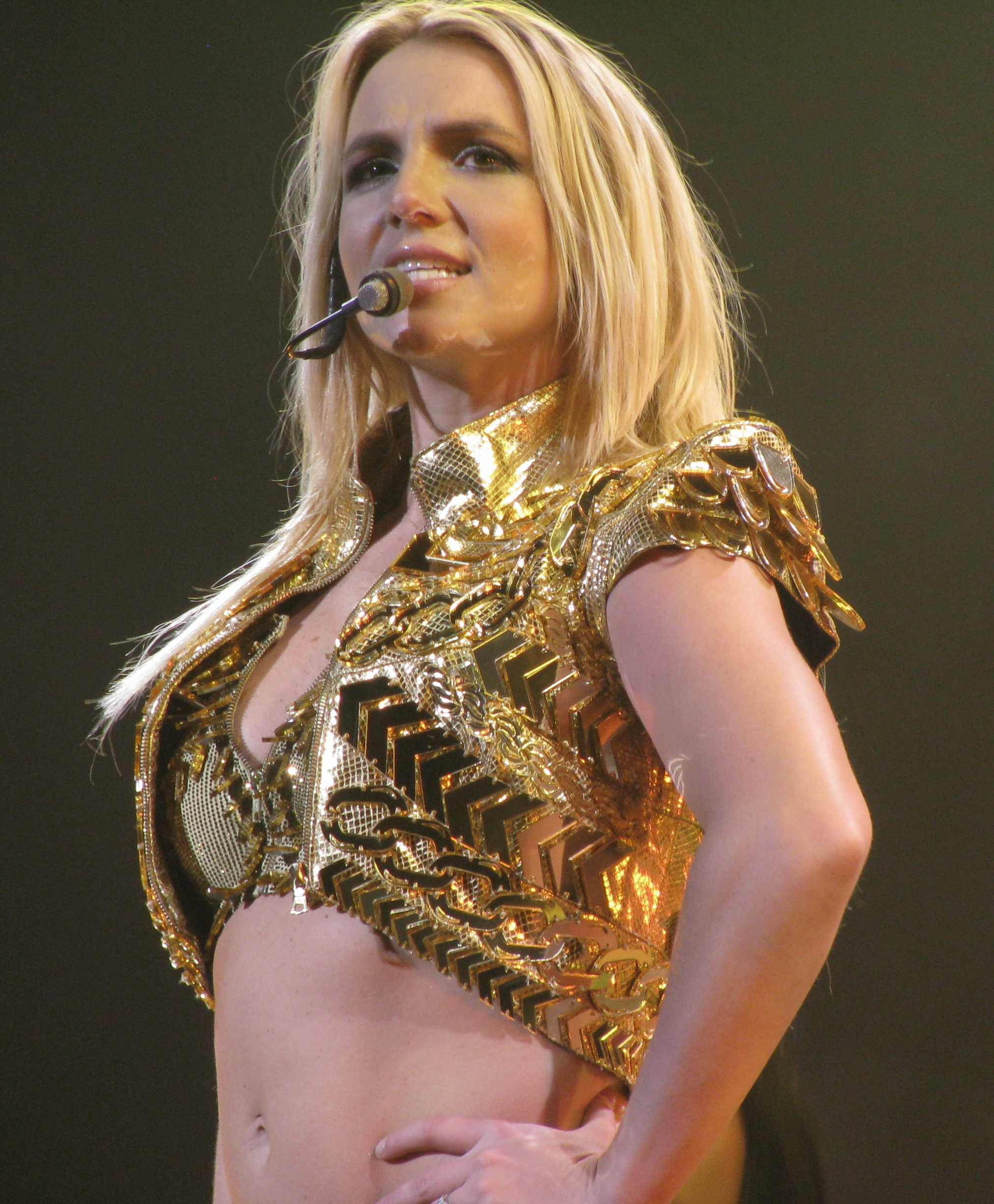
Upon the release of the music video, multiple critics noted the striking physical resemblance between Rihanna's ex-boyfriend Chris Brown (pictured, left) and Dudley O'Shaughnessy, as well as how the content of the video appeared to be a reenactment of Brown's assault on Rihanna. The plot and themes of the video also received comparisons to Britney Spears' (pictured, right) "Criminal" video, which premiered two days before "We Found Love".

After the release of the video, critics commented on the resemblance between Rihanna's ex-boyfriend Chris Brown and her fictional love interest in the video, Dudley O'Shaughnessy, and how the video's content appeared to be somewhat of a reenactment of the assault upon Rihanna by Brown on the evening of the 51st Annual Grammy Awards. Chris Doplan of Consequence of Sound explained that O'Shaughnessy strongly resembled Brown in his appearance. Amanda Dobbins of New York magazine concurred with Doplan, and wrote that O'Shaughnessy has short blond hair like Brown once had. Erika Ramirez of Billboard magazine also thought that O'Shaughnessy's character is a depiction of Brown, especially in relation to the scene which features the couple in a car, with O'Shaughnessy driving recklessly and Rihanna begging him to stop. William Goodman of Spin provided an analysis of the video with regard to the Brown comparisons. Like many reviewers, he noted the resemblance between Brown and O'Shaughnessy, writing "The clip stars a dead ringer for Brown, complete with dyed hair and bulging biceps". Goodman commented upon the video's opening narration, which was actually voiced by Agyness Deyn, "The video opens with a Rihanna voice-over that warns, 'You almost feel ashamed that someone could be that important. No one will ever understand how much it hurts ... you almost wish that you could have all that bad stuff back, so that you have the good'." In conclusion, Goodman commented that the scene showing an altercation in a car is reminiscent of Brown's assault on Rihanna, which occurred inside a car. Goodman wrote: "during a heated argument between the couple in a muscle car, the Brown look-alike gives the Barbadian beauty a slap on the face. Convinced yet?"

=== Britney Spears' "Criminal" ===
The video also received comparisons to Spears' "Criminal", which was released two days before "We Found Love", on October 17, 2011. Critics noted that both videos were filmed in the United Kingdom and caused controversy there, both contain scenes of sex, violence, and crime, and both featured "bad boy" stereotypes and evoke the personal lives of the artists. Katherine St Asaph of PopDust noted that although most pop stars release videos that draw from their personal lives, they do not make the viewer uncomfortable. The same cannot be said for Spears and Rihanna, regardless of whether they have moved on from past situations, because the discussion about them has not. St Asaph also expressed that neither Spears nor Rihanna said much about the parallels to their lives, but that they do not need to—their videos are much more effective than anything the singers could reveal in an interview. Rae Alexandra of the SF Weekly wrote that both videos feature an anti-British sentiment and that the villains in the video, Rihanna's boyfriend and Spears' policemen, are British, whereas Spears' savior in her video is an American criminal. Alexandra noted that Spears and Rihanna chose to film their grittiest videos in a country with a lower crime rate than the United States. According to her, the videos continue with a tradition of xenophobic portrayals of British people as villains by American film and video directors.

=== References to popular culture ===
The video for "We Found Love" references popular culture in the form of films. According to James Montgomery of MTV News, its main themes are sex, drugs, and violence, which feature heavily in works by independent filmmaker Gregg Araki. Many of Araki's films, including Totally Fucked Up (1993), The Doom Generation (1995) and Nowhere (1997), depict scenes of a sexual nature, drug abuse and violence as part of their narratives. "We Found Love"'s use of vibrant colors and imagery is reminiscent of Oliver Stone's 1994 film Natural Born Killers, which depicts two murderers, Mickey and Mallory, on a killing spree in the southwest of the United States. The film incorporates "nightmarish-colors" and rear wall projected imagery, similar to that shown in "We Found Love". Critics noted that the music video features visual effects that resembled those in Darren Aronofsky's film Requiem for a Dream (2000), which incorporates a close-up shot of a dilated pupil; this effect was used many times in "We Found Love"'s video.

Elements of the music video for "We Found Love" have been compared to the works of Britney Spears, Eminem and Madonna. The scene in which Rihanna and O'Shaughnessy blow marijuana exhalations into each other's mouths is stylistically reminiscent of the cover artwork on English musician Tricky's 2001 album Blowback. Rihanna's video was compared to the video for Spears' song "Everytime" (2004). Critics noted that Rihanna lay in a bathtub and submerged her head under the water, which can be interpreted as a suicide attempt. In "Everytime", Spears is shown as a successful singer constantly bothered by the media and paparazzi about her turbulent relationship with her boyfriend. In "Everytime"'s video, Spears drowns in a bathtub as a result of a concussion. Rihanna's video also bears resemblances to that for Eminem and Rihanna's "Love the Way You Lie" (2010); both contain lyrical and visual content about a doomed relationship and scenes of graphic violence and substance abuse. Like "We Found Love", "Love the Way You Lie" displays scenes of a couple in various stages of undress and intimacy. "We Found Love"'s video includes stylistic references to Madonna's video for "Ray of Light" (1998). James Montgomery of MTV News noted that "Ray of Light"'s video features "a whole lot of high-speed, time-lapse shots taken in cities around the world", the same technique used for the drug scenes in "We Found Love".

== Credits ==
Video credits

- Melina Matsoukas via Prettybird ― direction
- Juliette Larthe & Ben Sullivan ― produced
- Candice Ouaknine ― executive producer
- Paul Laufer ― direction of photography
- Mark Geraghty ― art director
- Mark Geraghty ― production designer
- Bert Yukich and Amy Yukich (KromA) ― visual effects
- Jeff Selis ― editional
- Agyness Deyn ― narration
- Calvin Harris ― cameo appearance
- Dudley O'Shaughnessy ― starring role
- Rihanna ― starring role

Song credits

- Rihanna ― vocals
- Calvin Harris ― songwriter, producer, recording, mixing and instrumentation
- Marcos Tovar ― vocal recording
- Alejandro Barajs ― assistant recording engineer
- Phil Tan ― mixing
- Damien Lewis ― assistant mixing

== Charts ==
Chart (2011–2012)	Peak position
Poland (Top Airplay TV Chart)	1
Romania TV Airplay (Media Forest)	1

== Release history ==
Country	Date	Format	Label	Ref.
Worldwide	October 19, 2011	Online premiere (via Vevo)	—N/a	
Argentina	October 22, 2011	Digital download	Def Jam Recordings	
Australia	October 22, 2011	Digital download	Def Jam Recordings	
Austria	October 22, 2011	Digital download	Def Jam Recordings	
Brazil	October 22, 2011	Digital download	Def Jam Recordings	
Czech Republic	October 22, 2011	Digital download	Def Jam Recordings	
France	October 22, 2011	Digital download	Universal Music	
Germany	October 22, 2011	Digital download	Universal Music	
Greece	October 22, 2011	Digital download	Def Jam Recordings	
Hungary	October 22, 2011	Digital download	Def Jam Recordings	
Ireland	October 22, 2011	Digital download	Def Jam Recordings	
Italy	October 22, 2011	Digital download	Def Jam Recordings	
Japan	October 22, 2011	Digital download	Def Jam Recordings	
The Netherlands	October 22, 2011	Digital download	Def Jam Recordings	
New Zealand	October 22, 2011	Digital download	Def Jam Recordings	
Spain	October 22, 2011	Digital download	Def Jam Recordings	
Switzerland	October 22, 2011	Digital download	Def Jam Recordings	
United States	October 25, 2011	Digital download	Def Jam Recordings	
