= Néro the Assassin =

French television series

- French: Néro
- Genre: Adventure; Fantasy
- Created by: Allan Mauduit; Jean-Patrick Benes; Martin Douaire; Nicolas Digard
- Written by: Allan Mauduit; Jean-Patrick Benes; Martin Douaire; Nicolas Digard; Raphaëlle Richet
- Directed by: Allan Mauduit; Ludovic Colbeau-Justin
- Starring: Pio Marmaï; Alice Isaaz; Olivier Gourmet; Lili-Rose Carlier Taboury; Louis-Do de Lencquesaing; Camille Razat; Yann Gael
- Composer: Guillaume Roussel
- Country of origin: France
- Original language: French
- No. of seasons: 1
- No. of episodes: 8

Production
- Producers: Antoine Rein; Antoine Gandaubert; Fabrice Goldstein; Antonio Mansilla
- Production locations: Eastern Pyrenees, Perpignan, Fort de Salses, Ventimiglia, Barcelona, Lleida, Valencia
- Cinematography: Vincent Gallot; Romain Lacourbas
- Editors: Olivier Gajan; Nathan Delannoy; Riwanon Le Beller; Cyril Nakache; Jean-Baptiste Morin
- Running time: 46–57 minutes
- Production companies: Karé Productions; Bonne Nouvelle Productions; Netflix

Original release
- Network: Netflix
- Release: 8 October 2025 – present

Néro the Assassin (French: Néro) is a French adventure fantasy television series created by Allan Mauduit, Jean-Patrick Benes, Martin Douaire and Nicolas Digard, and starring Pio Marmaï. The series was released on Netflix on October 8, 2025.

The project started as an adaptation of Jean-Philippe Jaworski's first speculative fiction fantasy novel Gagner la guerre (To the Victor go the Spoils). Similarities in stories include the assassin-spy and his high-ranked master, the road movie and chase theme, and the city-state of Lamartine and its analog in the novel of the Republic of Ciudalia as well as the witchcraft elements. However the series creators departed so much from the original that they agreed with the author that the final product was too different to be considered an adaptation.

== Plot ==
Set in 1504 (French Renaissance) in the south of France, the series revolves around Néro (Pio Marmaï), a skilled but jaded assassin who is betrayed by his patron and long-term ally. At the same time, the country is beset by civil unrest and danger due to a severe drought. Néro must navigate the enemies now after him and bands of roving "penitents", to retrieve and protect his daughter, Perla, who he had left in an orphanage years earlier. They discover that a prophecy about Perla has brought other forces to bear on their journey.

== Cast and characters ==
- Pio Marmaï as Néro Miséricorde
- Alice Isaaz as Hortense de Rochemort
- Olivier Gourmet as Horace (monk)
- Lili-Rose Carlier Taboury as Perla
- Louis-Do de Lencquesaing as Nicolas de Rochemort
- Camille Razat as La Borgne (one-eyed witch)
- Yann Gael as Lothar (knight of the consulate of Lamartine)
- Sandra Parfait as Zineb (assassin)
- Max Baissette de Malglaive as the Prince of Ségur
- Pauline Clément as princess Joséphine of Ségur
- Quentin D'Hainaut as L'Inquisiteur (Inquisition's envoy)
- David Talbot as the Archbishop of Ségur
- Scali Delpeyrat as the Chancellor of Ségur
- Laurent Claret as Barrin
- Noam Morgensztern as Frère Pénitence
- Raphaël Roger Levy as Rimbaud (assassin)

== Reception ==
As of December 2025 the series had two critics' reviews on Rotten Tomatoes. Joel Keller gave it a positive review, writing "Néro The Assassin has enough action and irreverence, with interesting protagonists and antagonists, to keep viewers engaged, despite a muddy mythology." Pramit Chatterjee gave it a mixed review, stating that it was in parts "convoluted and borderline inane", but praised Pio Marmaï, writing "at the end of the day, it’s Marmaï who sticks in your memory, and he absolutely earns his right to stay in your cranium. He is as good at pulling off complicated action choreography as he is at making you empathize with Nero in some very darkly comedic moments."

On the French language site allocine.fr, the series got an average rating of 3.6 out of 5 based on 151 audience reviews.
