= The Disappearance (2015 TV series) =

French television series

- French: Disparue
- Genre: Drama
- Based on: Desaparecida by Miguel Ángel Bernardeau
- Written by: Marie Deshaires; Catherine Touzet; Nathalie Alquier
- Directed by: Charlotte Brandström
- Composer: Frans Bak
- Country of origin: France
- Original language: French
- No. of seasons: 1
- No. of episodes: 8

Production
- Producers: Iris Bucher; Nicolas Duval Adassovsky; Laurent Zeitoun; Yann Zenou; Arnauld de Battice; Caroline de Borchgrave; Anne Leduc
- Production locations: Lyon, France
- Cinematography: Pascal Gennesseaux
- Running time: 52 minutes
- Production companies: Quad Télévision; AT-Production; RTBF

Original release
- Network: France 2
- Release: April 22 – May 13, 2015

The Disappearance (French: Disparue) is an eight-part French police thriller mini-series, which was originally broadcast in France from 22 April to 13 May 2015, and inspired by the Spanish series Desaparecida. The series was subsequently broadcast in the United Kingdom, in a subtitled version, beginning 28 May 2016, on BBC4.

The series explores the complex drama caused by the disappearance of a teenage girl in Lyon, and the subsequent police investigation to find her.

== Cast and credits ==
Actor	Character
Pierre-François Martin-Laval	Julien Morel, Lea's father
Alix Poisson	Florence Morel, Lea's mother
Camille Razat	Lea Morel
Maxime Taffanel	Thomas Morel, Lea's older brother
Stella Trotonda	Zoe Morel, Lea's younger sister
Laurent Bateau	Jean Morel, Julien's brother
Zoe Marchal	Chris Morel, Jean's daughter
Muriel Combeau	Sophie, Lea's god-mother
Francois-Xavier Demaison	Commandant Bertrand Molina
Alice Pol	Camille Guerin, Molina's deputy
Christophe Gendreau	Commissaire Louvin
Saida Jawad	Alex, forensic scene of crime officer
Leon Vitale	a police officer
Leo Legrand	Romain Jamond-Valette, Lea's boyfriend, who also dated Chris
Stéphane Debac	Mathias Tellier, Lea's teacher
Johan Libereau	Nicolas Barraut, a waiter at the Morel's cafe
Cylia Malki	Anne, Julien's former lover
Jacques Chambon	head teacher at Lea's school
Melanie Tran	Audrey, Thomas's girlfriend
Clementine Allain	Elodie, Nicolas's partner
Mary Luneau	Rose Molina, Bertrand's teenage daughter
Julie Seebacher	Jenny, la prostitute
Melanie Baxter Jones	Corinne, Jean's girlfriend
Mas Belsito	Marco Berti, racing car tutor
Cecile Giroud	Isabelle, Marco's wife
Frans Bak	Original music
Marie Deshaires and Catherine Touzet	Screenplay
Iris Bucher	Producer
Charlotte Brandstrom	Director
