= Jean Luc Herbulot =

Congolese film director and screenwriter (born 1983)

- Born: 1983 (age 42–43); Pointe-Noire, Republic of the Congo
- Occupations: Film director; screenwriter
- Years active: 2004—present
- Known for: Dealer

Jean Luc Herbulot (pronounced [ʒɑ̃ lyk ɛʁbylo]; born in 1983 in Pointe-Noire, Republic of the Congo) is a Congolese film director and screenwriter.

== Biography ==
Herbulot started drawing and writing stories at an early age. His activities included writing, drawing, composing music, working on video games, and graphic design.

In 2004, while studying editing as part of his multimedia studies in Paris, he directed his first short movie, titled Vierge(s), for which he also did the scriptwriting, storyboard, lighting, editing, and DVD release. Despite the amateur quality and the fact that the film was his first step in moviemaking, this project was quite successful at festivals and on the internet.

Herbulot graduated as a multimedia project manager and started to work for TF1 as a graphic designer. Meanwhile, he created his own production company, which made music videos exclusively for independent artists, in order to maintain high creative standards for low-budget productions.

In 2009, he co-produced and directed the film Concurrence loyale (Loyal Competition). The cast included Thierry Frémont and Sagamore Stévenin. The film was bought by Canal Plus and Orange, and distributed in Italy, Spain, Russia, and North Africa.

Herbulot won his first award for a hip hop music video at the French International Music Video Festival in Paris for his music video to the Medine and Youssoupha song "Blokkk Identitaire" in 2013.

In 2014, he wrote and directed the film Dealer, his first independent feature in France, which premiered at the Fantasia International Film Festival in Montreal, Canada, and opened the L'Étrange Festival in Paris. The film was inspired by the life of French actor Dan Bronchinson.

In 2019, he created, directed and operated as showrunner for the TV series Sakho & Mangane, entirely filmed in Dakar for Canal+ Afrique, with actors Yann Gael and Issaka Sawadogo.

His most recent project is the feature film Saloum, which mixes elements of African mythology with Western and horror. The film premiered at the 2021 Toronto International Film Festival.
