= Joseph A. Adesunloye =

British-Nigerian filmmaker and writer

- Occupation(s): Screenwriter, Filmmaker, Television director

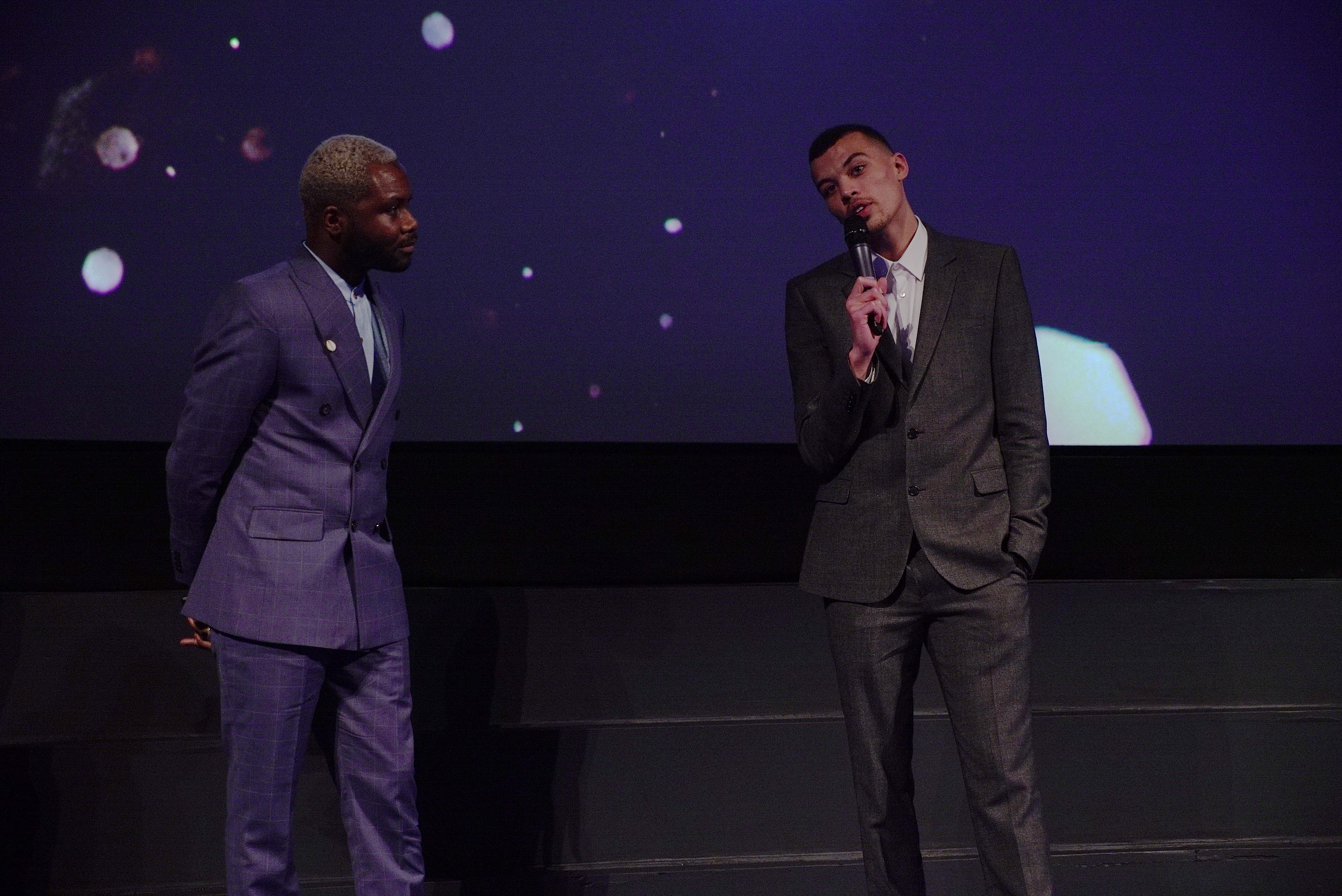
Adesunloye (left) and Dudley O'Shaughnessy (right), 2016

Joseph A. Adesunloye is British-Nigerian filmmaker, television director, and writer. He is known for his 2016 feature film White Colour Black, starring Dudley O'Shaughnessy, and his 2025 LGBT romantic drama Vanilla, starring Yann Gael. His production company is Dreamcoat Productions.

== Early life and education ==
Joseph A. Adesunloye was born in Lagos, Nigeria, the son of a Yoruba man and an Urhobo woman from the Niger-Delta region. He grew up in London, England. He has said that his early years in Nigeria, with his diverse cultural identity, "instilled in me an awareness that I am a product of multiple spaces, which shape how I see the world". He decided as a teenager that he wanted to be a filmmaker.

He graduated from the University of Aberdeen with an MA in English Literature & Film Studies, after completing undergraduate studies there first.

He graduated from the London Film Academy with a Filmmaking Diploma (a one-year course) in 2007.

== Career ==
In 2008 Adesunloye set up his own production company, DreamCoat Productions.

Adesunloye's first feature film was the 2016 drama White Colour Black. The film was selected to screen at the BFI London Film Festival in 2016, and was acclaimed by critics, including in The Guardian and The Times. The British Blacklist called it "a journey of self-discovery with stirring cinematography and a rich, purposeful narrative". It was also included by the British Film Institute in their "3 You Must See: LFF Black History" series.

His second feature film, Faces (2018), stars Terry Pheto. It became available on streaming services Amazon Prime and BFI Player.

In 2020 he was commissioned to make a short documentary film about five African writers shortlisted for the 2020 AKO Caine Prize for African Writing, which was titled Writing Africa.

Adesunloye's third feature film is LGBT romantic drama film, Vanilla, released in 2025, in which Yann Gael plays the lead role of Bastien.

== Recognition and awards ==
In 2016, Adesunloye was one of four young filmmakers nominated for the inaugural IWC Schaffhausen Filmmaker Bursary Award. The award recognised a UK-based writer or director with a first or second feature in official selection at the BFI London Film Festival, and was sponsored by Swiss watchmakers IWC Schaffhausen.

In 2017, Adesunloye was longlisted in the "Best Debut Screenwriter" category in the BIFA Awards (British Independent Film Awards), for his work in White Colour Black. The film was also longlisted for two BIFAs, including the category of "Most Promising Newcomer" for the film's star Dudley O'Shaughnessy.

White Colour Black was screened at the Baltimore International Black Film Festival 2017, winning Best International Feature and Best Narrative Feature. Adesunloye received the Oscar Micheaux Award for directing.

Faces was nominated for the "Best International Feature" award at the Durban International Film Festival in 2018.

== Filmography ==
- 2025 Vanilla
- 2020 Writing Africa (Short)
- 2019 2064 (Short) (as Joseph Adesunloye)
- 2018 Faces
- 2017 46 (Short)
- 2016 White Colour Black
- 2014 Beyond Plain Sight (Short)
- 2013 Tangle (Short)
- 2012 Labalaba, He'll Return (Short)
- 2007 Shadowed (Short) (as Joseph Adesunloye)
