= Camille Razat =

French actress and model (born 1994)

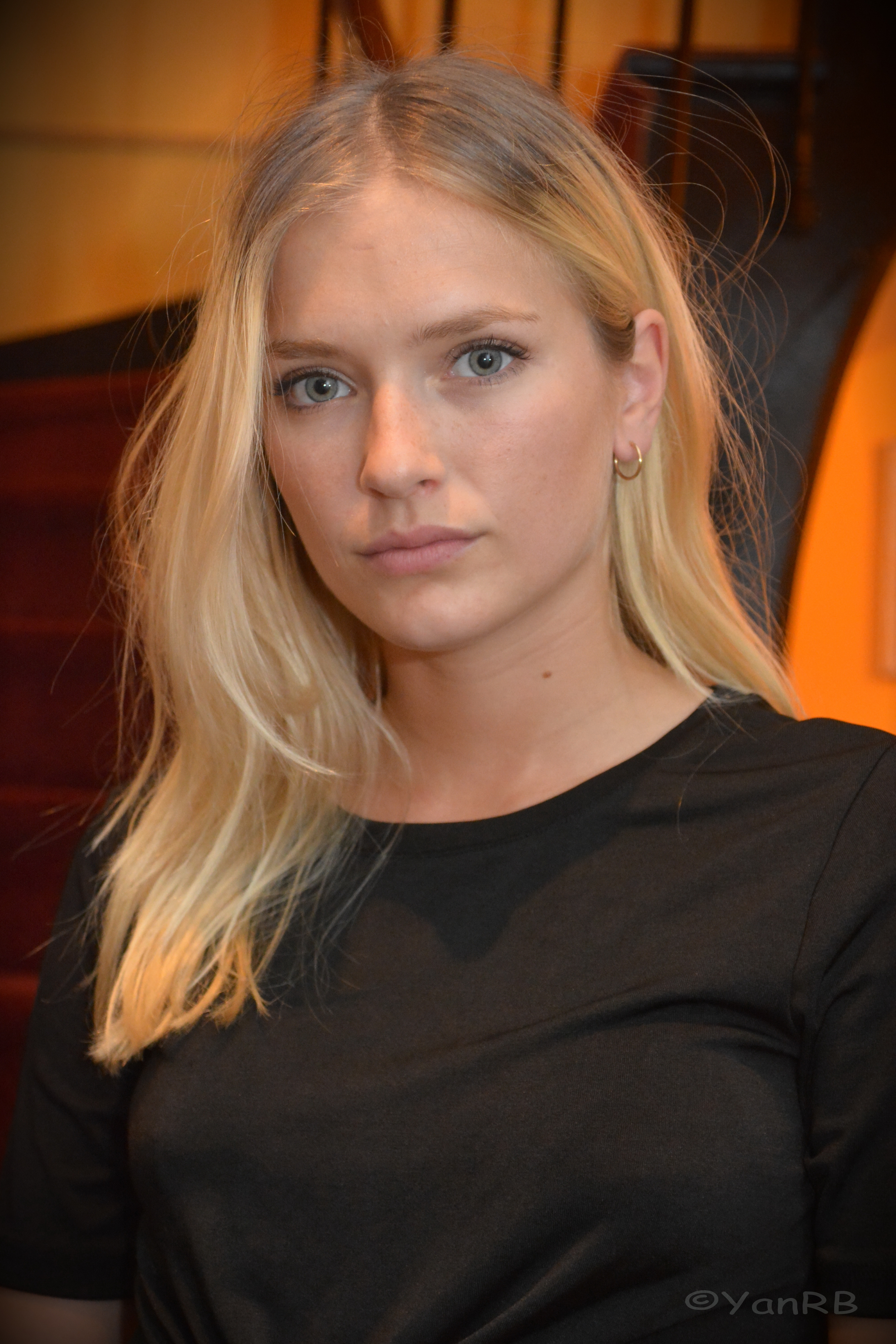
- Razat in 2018
- Born: 1 March 1994 (age 32); Toulouse, Occitanie, France
- Occupations: Actress; model
- Height: 5 ft 6 in (1.68 m)

Camille Émilie Razat (born 1 March 1994) is a French actress and model. She is known for playing Léa Morel in France 2 drama The Disappearance, Salome in Josée Dayan's Capitaine Marleau, Camille in the Netflix television series Emily in Paris, and the one-eyed witch in the Netflix series Néro the Assassin.

== Early life and education ==
Camille Razat was born in Saint-Jean, Haute-Garonne, France and spent her early childhood in Montberon before moving to Toulouse. She completed her schooling at the Lycée Saint-Sernin in Toulouse. At 16, she began her career in modelling, moving to Paris at 18. Razat later studied acting at Cours Florent drama school there, where she trained in theatre and screen performance.

== Career ==
=== Modelling ===
Razat began modelling in her mid-teens. Now represented by the French agency Premium Models, she has been featured in multiple editorials for publications such as Elle, L'Officiel, and Vogue. Razat has presented for the brands Louis Vuitton, Cartier, Balmain, and Lancôme.

Razat has taken part in Paris Fashion Week events and continues to work in fashion alongside her acting career, also appearing as a spokesperson for French Vanity Fair. In 2020, Roger Vivier’s creative director Gherardo Felloni chose Razat for a campaign featuring the brand's jewelry collections.

=== Acting ===
Razat began her screen career with the role of Léa Morel in The Disappearance (2015), which earned her national attention in France. She went on to appear in a number of French television series and films before gaining international recognition with her portrayal of Camille in the Netflix series Emily in Paris. She made her theatre debut in 2018 in Amanda Sthers' play Le Vieux Juif blonde. She has also starred in feature films such as Girls with Balls (2018), Paris Pigalle (2018) and The Accusation (2021).

Razat founded her production company, Tazar Production, in 2022. The company has produced several short films to date, including The Ceremony (2023) and Condensation (2023), both produced by Samuel Kaperski, A Draft (À la Dérive, 2024), directed by Célia Pyamoottoo, and Fortune (2025), co-directed by Kaperski and Pyamoottoo. Tazar Production has also created 2 music videos. Its objective is to soon produce feature-length films while maintaining “creative freedom.” and, more recently, “[to give] a chance to new talents.”

== Personal life ==
Originally, Razat wanted to become a war correspondent. Before committing to five years of studying for it, she challenged herself to do something “a little more fun and light, without it being a sabbatical year,” thus taking a theatre internship at Cours Florent. After loving “everything [she] did there,” Razat decided to pursue acting, and began doing so professionally after attending the school for 3 years. Razat has cited American filmmakers John Cassavetes and Gena Rowlands as major influences on her acting, explaining in interviews that she grew up watching films with her mother and developed an early love of cinema.

Razat is in a relationship with French photographer Etienne Baret. She announced their engagement on Instagram in 2021, although the original post is no longer publicly available.

== Filmography ==
Television and film roles
Year	Title	Role	Notes	Ref.
2015	The Disappearance	Lea Morel	Main role; French title: Disparue	
2015	Capitaine Marleau	Salome Delevigne	1 episode	
2017	Rock'n Roll	Fille boîte de nuit	Film	
2018	Girls with Balls	Lise	Film	
2018	Paris Pigalle	Caprice	Film	
2018	The 15:17 to Paris	Train Attendant #1	Film	
2020–2024	Emily in Paris	Camille	Main role (40 Episodes)	
2021	The Accusation	Quitterie	Film	
2025	Néro the Assassin	La Borgne	7 episodes	
2025	Waltzing with Brando	Michelle	Film	
2025	The Lost Station Girls	Flore Robin	6 episodes	
