= Hellbender (film) =

- Theatrical release poster
- Directed by: John Adams; Zelda Adams; Toby Poser
- Written by: John Adams; Zelda Adams; Toby Poser
- Produced by: Toby Poser
- Starring: Zelda Adams; Toby Poser; John Adams; Lulu Adams
- Cinematography: John Adams; Zelda Adams
- Edited by: John Adams
- Music by: John Adams
- Production company: Wonder Wheel Productions
- Distributed by: Shudder
- Release dates: August 14, 2021 (Fantasia Fest); February 24, 2022 (United States)
- Running time: 86 minutes
- Country: United States
- Language: English
- Box office: $67,474

Hellbender is a 2021 American horror film written and directed by John Adams, Zelda Adams and Toby Poser, all of whom also star in the film. The story follows a mother-daughter metal band living in an isolated woodland home, whose relationship is challenged when the daughter discovers the family's secret.

== Plot ==
Izzy and her mother (who is never named) live a quiet, remote existence in the woods, spending most of their time creating metal music. They eat a strictly vegan, foraged diet, and Izzy is home-schooled and forbidden to have any contact with others, her mother telling her that she has an autoimmune disease. Her mother visits the nearby town for art supplies, but Izzy is not allowed to go.

After a chance meeting with a teenaged neighbor, Izzy is invited to a party where she consumes a worm on a dare, and begins to hallucinate. Her mother is disturbed when she learns of it, but begins to tell Izzy about what they are and the powers that are awakening in her. She explains that they are Hellbenders, an all-female, matriarchal clan of supernatural beings. ("A cross between a witch, a demon, and an apex predator.") Their magic is based on fear, especially the fear of death, which the Hellbender absorbs when she eats a living thing; the bigger and more advanced the creature, the more power is drawn from eating it.

Izzy realizes that she was never ill, and that their isolated life has been her mother's plan to keep her from realizing her heritage. Izzy's mother stresses the importance of controlling their power by strictly limiting what they consume - she snacks on mealworms as a treat - but Izzy becomes power-hungry and begins killing animals in the forest.

Her mother grows alarmed as she realizes she is losing control of Izzy and her increasing power, and their relationship becomes strained. In an attempt to bond with Izzy and remain close to her, her mother shares her mealworm stash and they have a hallucinogenic experience together. Under the influence, she confesses to Izzy that she is over a hundred years old, and that Hellbenders reproduce by consuming their mothers.

Izzy constructs a tunnel under the house and traps her teenaged neighbor there, using her as a food source. When her mother discovers it, Izzy calmly tells her she's in no danger, because Izzy isn't yet ready to become a mother. She then says she's going to town and soars into the sky, appearing for the first time in her full, monstrous Hellbender form.

== Cast ==
- Zelda Adams as Izzy
- Toby Poser as Mother
- Lulu Adams as Amber
- John Adams as Uncle
- Rinzin Thonden as AJ
- Khenzom as Ingrid

== Production ==
John Adams and Toby Poser are married, and Lulu and Zelda are their children. Inspired by the musical project H6LLB6ND6R they had formed two years earlier, the family devised a film exploring parenting, witchcraft and matriarchy. The filmmaking family shot the film in their home in Catskill, New York during COVID-19 pandemic lockdowns, taking turns as the film crew. Many scenes and dialogue in the film were improvised.

== Release ==
Hellbender premiered at the 25th Fantasia International Film Festival on August 14, 2021. It was released on Shudder on February 24, 2022.

== Reception ==
On the review aggregator website Rotten Tomatoes, 97% of 67 critics' reviews are positive, with an average rating of 7.3/10. The website's consensus reads: "Hellbender stirs a boiling cauldron of adolescent angst, serving up a coming-of-age story with dark horror overtones." On Metacritic, the film has a weighted average score of 70 out of 100, based on 9 critics, indicating "generally favorable" reviews.

Leslie Felperin of The Guardian awarded the film three out of five stars, praising the film's script, visual effects, and cinematography, calling it "[a] highly original exercise in folk horror". Katie Rife from The A.V. Club scored the film a grade B, commending the film's cinematography, visuals, editing, and performances, while also noting the film's low-budget special effects.

Brian Tallerico of RogerEbert.com gave the film three out of four stars, commending the Adams family for making "daring, confident genre films", adding that it "gets better as it gets more surreal". He added that the film lives up to the legacy of the "witch horror" genre.
