= A Wounded Fawn =

- Directed by: Travis Stevens
- Written by: Travis Stevens; Nathan Faudree
- Produced by: Joe Barbagallo; Laurence Gendron; Travis Stevens
- Starring: Sarah Lind; Josh Ruben; Malin Barr
- Cinematography: Ksusha Genenfeld
- Music by: Vaaal
- Release date: December 1, 2022 (Shudder)
- Running time: 91 minutes
- Country: United States
- Language: English

A Wounded Fawn is a 2022 American horror film directed by Travis Stevens and written by Stevens and Nathan Faudree. It stars Sarah Lind, Josh Ruben and Malin Barr.

== Plot ==
Several people are at an auction bidding on a statue of The Wrath of the Erinyes, which features the three sisters descending on a male victim. Kate and Bruce are bidding against each other, with Kate ultimately winning. That night, at her home, Bruce knocks on her door and claims he has a client who will pay double what she did for the statue. While the two discuss the piece, Bruce sees a tall, silent, owl-like figure that demands he take Kate's life, and he murders her.

Meredith, a museum curator, is discussing a prior bad relationship with her psychiatrist. She later tells her friends she has a date with Bruce. He’s going to take her to his cabin for a romantic weekend. On the drive there Meredith sees a street-side market and asks to stop for snacks and to use the bathroom. Bruce, not wanting to be seen with his next victim, says they’re almost there and can she wait.

When they arrive at the cabin it’s dark and Bruce goes to unlock the door while Meredith gets out of the car. She hears a disembodied voice yell for her to leave, as well as a scream as she shuts the trunk. Bruce doesn’t hear anything. Inside, Meredith notices the statue at Bruce's home. He tells her it is a replica, but Meredith remembers it coming through the museum she works at and doesn’t believe him. While he cooks dinner she goes though a photo album where all the photos have been taken out. She finds one of Bruce being affectionate with a woman outside the house, and the back says her name is Leonora. Throughout the evening, Meredith keeps seeing and hearing things, at one point there is clearly a woman right outside on the patio. Meredith is spooked and on edge, with an increasingly agitated Bruce telling her she just needs to relax and nothing is there. She finally tells him she is scared and wants to leave which angers Bruce. He relents and she goes to pack her bag. Meredith texts a photo of the statue to a friend, who tells her it's legitimate and that Kate has disappeared, and she needs to leave. Bruce meanwhile sees the owl figure again and prepares to kill Meredith. She comes out and he attacks her. She fights back, but he gains the upper hand and stabs her in the throat. She appears dead, but shortly after she uses the statue to beat him in the head and cuts his eye, before running away.

Bruce then experiences strange visions of mysterious figures taunting him. One of them is the Owl, whose encounter reveals Bruce has a tumor in his brain, suggesting his hallucinations and compulsion to murder are due to the tumor. Three female figures accompany the Owl, representing Kate, Meredith, and Bruce's murdered girlfriend, Leonora. The Meredith figure asks whether Bruce or his murderous persona, the Owl, selected her. He says both, but she insists Bruce and the Owl are one and the same. The Owl demands a sacrifice must be made, and Bruce commits suicide. As he bleeds out, the Meredith figure watches him.

== Cast ==
- Sarah Lind as Meredith Tanning
- Josh Ruben as Bruce Ernst
- Malin Barr as Kate Horna
- Katie Kuang as Leonora
- Laksmi Hedemark as Julia
- Tanya Everett as Wendy
- Marshall Taylor Thurman as the Red Owl
- Neal Mayer as auctioneer

== Release ==
The film premiered at the 2022 Tribeca Festival, and was screened at FrightFest London and Fantastic Fest. The film was released on Shudder on December 1, 2022.

== Reception ==
=== Critical response ===
The film received positive reviews from critics. On the review aggregator website Rotten Tomatoes, 96% of 47 critics' reviews are positive, with an average rating of 7.40/10. The website's consensus reads: "Delightfully dark and impressively ambitious, A Wounded Fawn offers a grimly distinctive treat for slasher fans."

Noel Murray of the Los Angeles Times wrote that the film was "really all of a piece in the way it toys with expectations, keeping viewers off-balance. Stevens and company put the audience in the place of both the predator and prey." Katie Rife of RogerEbert.com said that the film was "a film that celebrates art and art history, one that reaches back across the millennia for inspiration and pulls out symbolism that still resonates today", giving it 3/4 stars. Nick Schager of The Daily Beast praised Lind's performance, and added, "Stevens' phantasmagoric horror show embraces the incomprehensible, even as it preserves a tether to the Greco-Roman mythology at its core."

=== Awards ===
The film was nominated for Best Streaming Premiere Movie at the 2023 Fangoria Chainsaw Awards.
