= Pretty Boy Smooth =

American professional wrestler

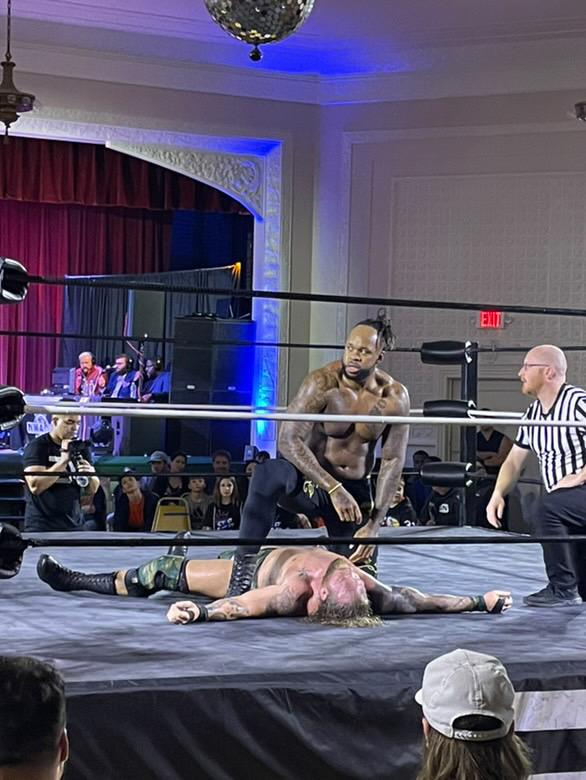

Personal information
- Born: Paul Bilbo; October 15, 1991 (age 35) Hempstead, New York, United States
- Education: Mercyhurst University
- Website: www.PrettyBoySmooth.com

Professional wrestling career
- Ring name: Pretty Boy Smooth
- Billed height: 6 ft 9 in (206 cm)
- Billed weight: 260 lb (118 kg)
- Trained by: Ethan Carter III; Aaron Draven; Candice LeRae; Johnny Gargano; Pepper Parks
- Debut: March 13, 2016

Paul Bilbo (born October 15, 1991), better known by his ring name Pretty Boy Smooth, is an American professional wrestler, actor, and philanthropist. He is currently signed to the National Wrestling Alliance.

== Early life and education ==
Born in Hempstead, New York, Bilbo started at St. Dominic High School in Oyster Bay, New York, where he helped lead the Bayhawk team to a 52–24 record in his last three seasons. Bilbo played Division I basketball at Hofstra University with former future Golden State Warriors 2011 second round draft pick, Charles Jenkins. Bilbo finished his collegiate career at Division II college Mercyhurst University He received a bachelor's degree in communications and a master's degree in organizational leadership.

== Professional wrestling career ==
Smooth began training as a professional wrestler for Pro Wrestling Rampage in Erie, PA under head trainer Aaron Draven. When the school closed, he trained under WWE's Johnny Gargano at the Absolute Intense Wrestling School in Cleveland, Ohio, then later with AEW's The Blade at Grapplers Anonymous in Buffalo, NY. Smooth's official professional wrestling debut was March 13, 2016.

Smooth is currently a feature talent for the National Wrestling Alliance, both for NWA POWERRR, and the first of the new NWA territories, NWA Exodus. On May 11, 2024, Pretty Boy Smooth accompanied by Pastor C-Lo, defeated Brandon Day, Cristiano Argento, and Kal Herro in a Fatal Four Way Elimination Match to become the inaugural NWA Midwest Champion, the heavyweight title for the Exodus territory that is officially sanctioned by the National Wrestling Alliance. Smooth held the title for 252 days with 20 title defenses across 10 different wrestling promotions before eventually losing the title to Dante Casanova on January 18, 2025, at NWA Exodus: Begin Again.

On January 17, 2026, at NWA Exodus, Smooth was offered a full-time contract with the National Wrestling Alliance by NWA World Heavyweight Champion Silas Mason, which he accepted. The news was first reported by Sean Ross Sapp of Fightful and later picked up by other wrestling media outlets. Smooth signed a long-term deal, making him an exclusive talent for the NWA.

Smooth was also a mainstay at AIW and won several titles on the independent wrestling circuit, including an eight-month AIW tag team title run with Hornswoggle, and a victory over Tracy Williams for the AIW Absolute Championship, a victory over Wardlow of All Elite Wrestling Revenge Heavyweight Championship, and more recently winning the RYSE Grand Championship with a win over 6 competitors in one night, including Colin Delaney. Smooth appeared on AEW Collision on September 16, 2023, tagging with Wes Barkley vs Aussie Open on TBS.

== Professional wrestling style and personas ==
Standing at 6 ft 9 in (2.06 m) tall and 260 lb (120 kg), Pretty Boy Smooth has a large physical presence that informs his in-ring style. Performing under the nickname “The Urban Playboy,” his wrestling approach emphasizes power-based offense, including slams and strikes delivered from his height advantage. His reported signature moves include the “Hoss Cross” (a knockout punch) and “The Penthouse” (a standing blue thunder bomb).

== Filmography ==
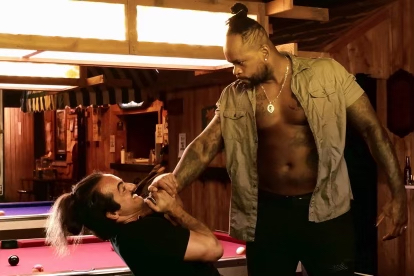
P. B. Smooth in the film Pact of Vengeance.

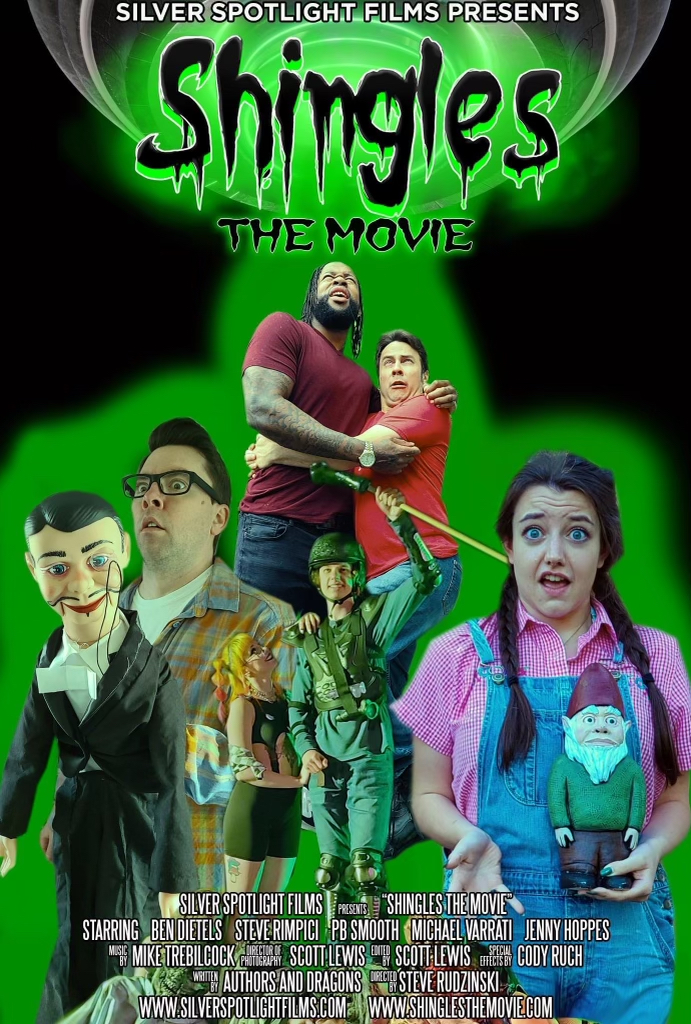
P. B. Smooth featured in Shingles the Movie poster

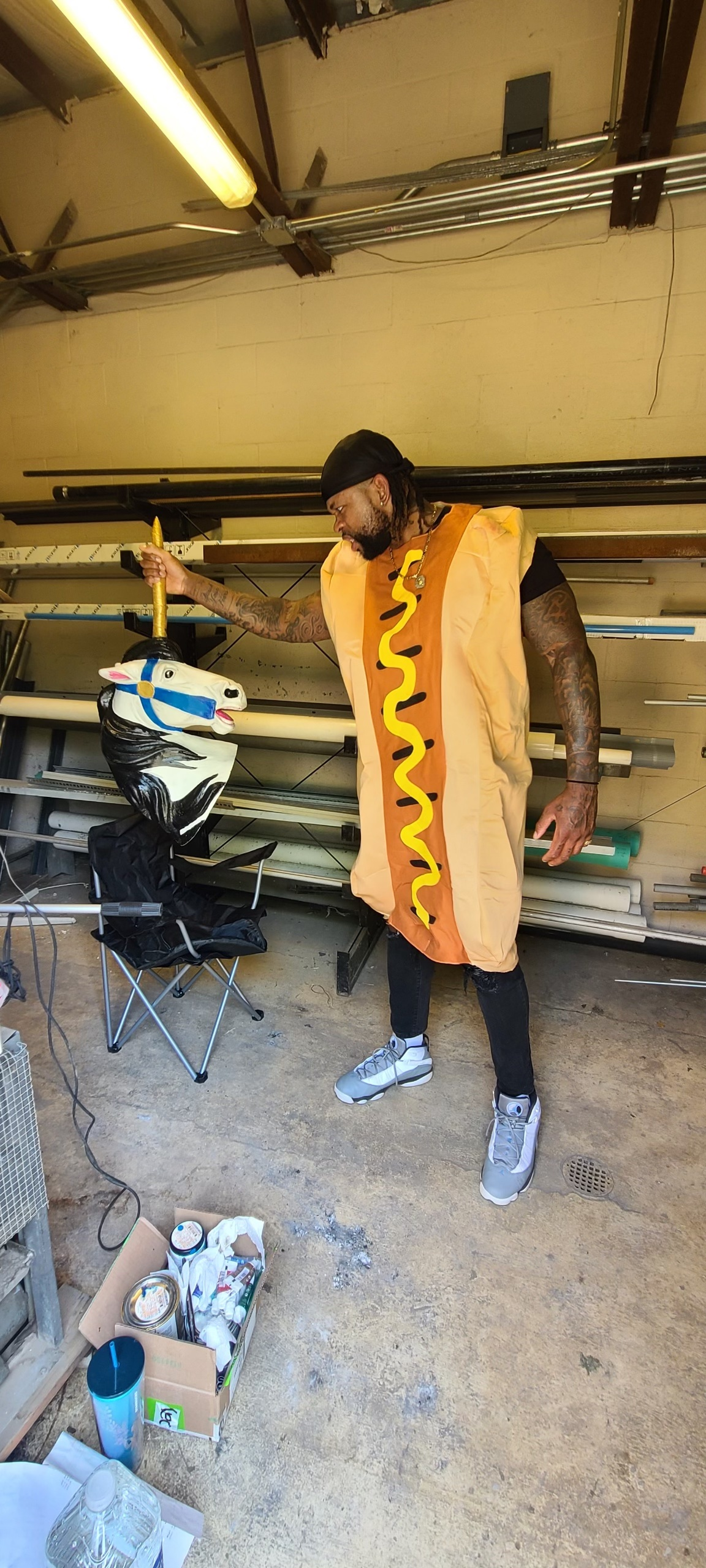
P. B. Smooth behind the scenes in CarousHELL 3

List of acting appearances in feature films
| Year | Title | Role | Notes | Refs |
|---|---|---|---|---|
| 2022 | Pact of Vengeance | Hightower | | |
| 2022 | Shingles the Movie | Smasher | | |
| 2023 | CarousHELL 3 | Ben | | |

== Personal life ==
Smooth lives in Erie, Pennsylvania.

In 2020, Smooth founded the PB Provides Scholarship Fund which is awarded yearly to an African American student who is interested in obtaining a communications degree at Mercyhurst University.

In 2025, Smooth became a sponsored athlete for Gaspari Nutrition.

== Championships and accomplishments ==
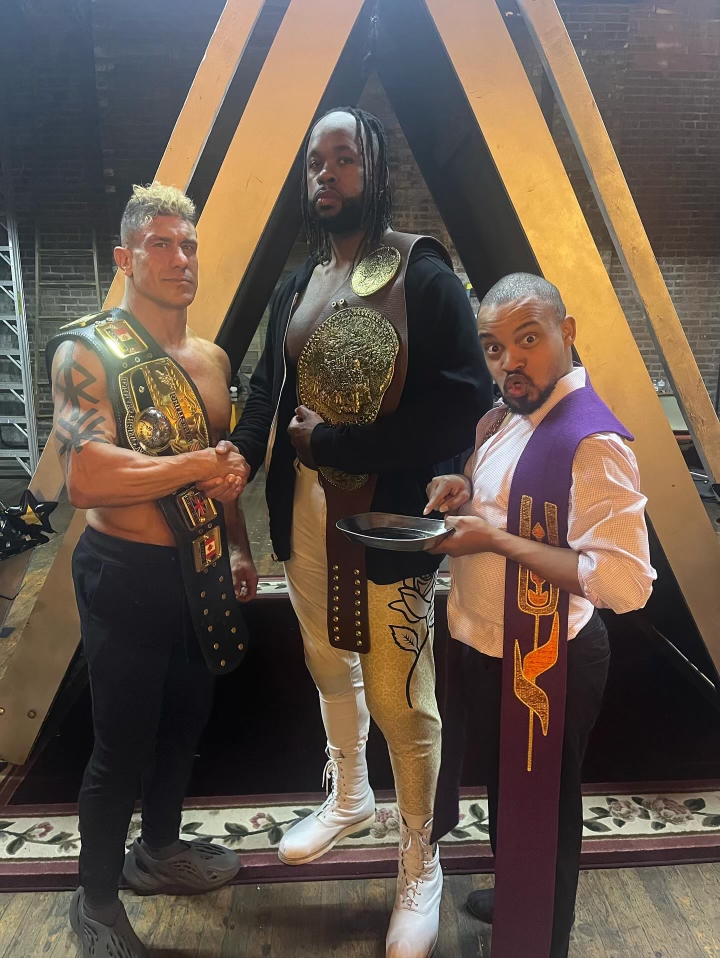
2024 NWA Exodus Midwest Heavyweight Champion Pretty Boy Smooth accompanied by Pastor C-Lo and EC3

- RYSE Wrestling
  - RYSE Wrestling Grand Championship (1 time)
- Absolute Intense Wrestling
  - AIW Absolute Championship (1 time)
  - AIW Future Cup (2017)
  - AIW Tag Team Championship (1 time) – with Hornswoggle
- NWA Exodus Pro Midwest
  - NWA Midwest Heavyweight Championship (1 time, inaugural)
- Expect The Unexpected Wrestling
  - ETU Atlantic Tag Team Championship (1 time, inaugural) – with J Boujii
  - Title Wave Tournament (2025) – with J Boujii
- Pro Wrestling Illustrated
  - Ranked No. 258 of the top 500 singles wrestlers in the PWI 500 in 2026
- Pro Wrestling Rampage
  - Pro Wrestling Rampage Tag Team Championship (1 time) – with Colby Redd
- Revenge Pro Wrestling
  - Revenge Heavyweight Championship (1 time)
