= Steve Rudzinski =

American director and writer

- Born: February 14, 1987 (age 39); Leesburg, Florida
- Occupations: Director, writer, actor
- Known for: Amityville Christmas Vacation; CarousHELL

Steve Rudzinski is an American director, writer, and actor known for his film Amityville Christmas Vacation and the CarousHELL trilogy.

== Career ==
Rudzinski started working as a filmmaker in 2010 and had a goal of releasing ten films before 2020. He operates primarily in Pittsburgh, Pennsylvania and prefers to film in the area. In 2019, Rudzinski released CarousHELL, a horror film about a killer carousel unicorn. He released a sequel to the film in 2021 and completed the trilogy in 2023. Aleen Isley, a frequent collaborator, has worked with Rudzinski since 2012, after responding to a Craigslist casting call for one of his early films, Everyone Must Die!.

Rudzinski has also worked as an actor for Marvel Comics Live Appearance, where he portrayed Spider-Man.

== Personal life ==
Rudzinksi was born in 1987 in Florida. He is bisexual.

== Awards and recognition ==
- Fangoria Chainsaw Award for Best Amityville (2023, won - Amityville Christmas Vacation)
- Best Filmmaker, Best of Pittsburgh City Paper (2023, won)

== Select filmography ==
- Captain Z & The Terror of Leviathan (2012)
- Everyone Must Die! (2012)
- CarousHELL (2016)
- Slaughter Drive (2017, actor, as Duncan Filmore)
- A Meowy Christmas (2017)
- A Meowy Halloween (2018)
- A Meowy St. Patrick's Day (2020, short film)
- A Meowy Christmas Vacation (2020)
- CarousHELL 2 (2021)
- A Meowy Dark Timeline (2022, short film)
- Amityville Christmas Vacation (2022)
- Shingles: The Movie (2023)
- Rye Hard - A CarousHELL (2023, short film)
- CarousHELL 3 (2023)
- Curtains for Christmas (2024)
- A Cheesy Christmas (2024)
- Wally Meets Popeye (2025)
- CarousHELL 4 (2026)
