= CarousHell =

American comedy slasher film trilogy

CarousHell (stylized as CarousHELL) is an American comedy slasher film trilogy, directed by Steve Rudzinski. The three films: CarousHell, CarousHell 2, CarousHell 3, released in 2016, 2021, and 2023, respectively, are about a killer carousel unicorn named Duke.

== Synopsis ==
The CarousHell films revolve around Duke, a carousel unicorn. In the first film, he is mishandled by children, after which he breaks free from the carousel and seeks revenge by killing multiple people. The film features a sex scene between Duke and a woman; Felix Vasquez of Cinema Crazed called it "one of the most awkward sex scenes ever filmed".

In the second film, Duke becomes a father, and his son, Robbie, is hunted by Nazis.

In CarousHell 3, Duke and his son are hunted by a carousel rabbit.

== Cast ==
- Steve Rimpici as Duke (CarousHell 1–3)
- Brittany Barnebei as Robbie (CarousHell 2–3)
- Aleen Isley as Ilsa (CarousHell 2)
- Terence Lee Cover as Otto (CarousHell 2)
- Mark McConnell Jr. as Klaus (CarousHell 2)
- Rebecca Rinehart as Katrina (CarousHell 2)

== Production and release ==
Aleen Isley pitched the idea of Caroushell to Steve Rudzinski; the two of them co-wrote the film and Rudzinski directed. Duke is an inanimate carousel horse. In CarousHell 2 and 3, the character Robbie is a puppet voiced and controlled by Brittany Barnebei. Rudzinski said in an interview that he disliked working with the puppet due to having to move the wires out of the camera. Carousel 2 was filmed in Canonsburg and Coraopolis, Pennsylvania, over the course of eleven days.

CarousHell premiered at the Calgary Horror Convention in 2017. CarousHell 2 premiered at The Hollywood Theater in Dormont, Pennsylvania.

== Reception ==
Reviews for the first CarousHell film were generally favorable. Common elements of praise centered on the film's humor, dialogue, and on-screen kills. Reviewers such as Kieran Fisher of Dread Central and Felix Vasquez of Cinema Crazed highlighted the movie's bizarreness, prompting Fisher to call it "the funniest horror comedy of 2016, as well as most brilliantly bizarre". Blacktooth of Horror Society rated the film 4/5 stars, writing "it had a fun story, a comedic angle, and was set to star some of my favorite indie actors". Charlie Cargile of PopHorror wrote that the film is "fucking amazing" and complimented its dialogue and acting.

Both sequels received positive reviews from PopHorror. Tori Danielle, the reviewer of CarousHell 2, called it "a blast", and Jason Burke complimented CarousHell 3's character arcs and special effects.
