= Saloum (film) =

2021 film by Jean Luc Herbulot

- Theatrical release poster
- Directed by: Jean Luc Herbulot
- Written by: Jean Luc Herbulot
- Story by: Jean Luc Herbulot; Pamela Diop
- Produced by: Pamela Diop; Jean Luc Herbulot
- Starring: Yann Gael; Roger Sallah; Mentor Ba; Evelyne Ily Juhen; Bruno Henry; Marielle Salmier
- Cinematography: Gregory Corandi
- Edited by: Nicolas Desmaison; Alasdair McCulloch; Sébastien Prangère
- Music by: Reksider
- Production companies: Lacmé; Rumble Fish Productions; Tableland Pictures
- Release date: 30 September 2021 (TIFF)
- Running time: 84 minutes
- Countries: Senegal; France
- Languages: French; Wolof
- Box office: $5,078

Saloum is a 2021 crime horror-thriller film directed by Congolese filmmaker Jean Luc Herbulot, written and produced by Herbulot and Pamela Diop. Set in Senegal in 2003, it mostly uses a mix of French, Wolof, and sign language.

The film follows a trio of elite African mercenaries, the "Hyenas of Bangui", who, on their way by plane from Bissau to Dakar, try to lie low and find supplies in a resort near Saloum Delta in Senegal, where they must hide their identities and fight for survival. The film stars Yann Gael, Roger Sallah and Mentor Ba as the Hyenas, alongside Evelyne Ily Juhen, Bruno Henry, and Marielle Salmier in supporting roles; it was one of Ba's final roles, as he died in August 2023. It is a fictional story taking inspiration from African legends and real-life events.

The film had its international premiere in the Midnight Madness section of the 2021 Toronto International Film Festival on 30 September 2021. The film received critical acclaim and was screened worldwide, and began streaming internationally on Shudder in September 2022. Saloum was met with very positive reviews, with praise for its unique blend of styles and influences, direction, and performances. Herbulot won the Award for Best Director in the Next Wave section at the Fantastic Fest, and the film won the Audience Award for most popular film in the Altered States program at the 2021 Vancouver International Film Festival.

== Plot ==
The Hyenas of Bangui, elite African mercenaries Chaka, Rafa, and Minuit, are hired to extract Felix, a Mexican drug lord, from Bissau, Guinea-Bissau amid the 2003 coup d'état and take him to Dakar, Senegal in exchange for a briefcase full of gold. En route, a leak in their airplane, which they later identify as sabotage, forces them to land in a remote part of the Senegalese region of Sine-Saloum.

Seeking a place where they can escape the police and find resin and fuel to fix their plane, Chaka, a native of Sine-Saloum, leads the Hyenas and Felix to an isolated resort named the Baobab, near the Senegalese Saloum river delta, claiming to be familiar with the place and its owner, Omar. The four men, posing as gold miners, are introduced to Omar's trusted employee Salamane and the Baobab's other guests: artists Younce and Sephora, and Awa, a woman who is both deaf and mute. Tensions arise due to both Awa revealing to the Hyenas via sign language (which only she and the Hyenas understand) that she knows who they are and will reveal their true identities unless they let her join them, and the last-minute arrival of guest Souley, a policeman from Dakar, who claims to have come on vacation.

The next day, Souley reveals to Felix that he knows of their true identities and that his teams will raid the Baobab during dinner. During dinner, a vengeful Chaka reveals, to the surprise of everyone else, that he is a former child soldier who served under Omar, who was previously a warlord known as Colonel Remington, until an eleven-year old Chaka escaped after having been imprisoned and raped repeatedly by Omar. Chaka kills Omar using the revolver he had stolen from him during his escape as a child. Souley calls for reinforcements, but Chaka reveals that he bought out Souley's men earlier the same day using some of Felix's gold. A furious Rafa realizes that it was Chaka who had sabotaged the plane, having orchestrated the whole course of events since their departure to take revenge on Omar.

Suddenly, night turns to day and swarm-like entities appear and kill Felix. As the survivors seek shelter, Salamane reveals that Omar was keeping the curse of Gana Sira Bana (Note: A real-life legend, which claims that Bainuk king Gana Sira Bana cursed his own people and lands after many of them conspired in an effort to kill him.) from breaking free in the Saloum Delta. As the entities kill mostly by sound, the survivors find ways to isolate their ears from external sounds, with Awa's deafness and the Hyenas' use of sign language proving to be useful assets.

Rafa forgives Chaka for lying, and the two, with Souley and Salamane, travel to the nearby village of Sira Bana-worshipping Diola people to find more ways to isolate themselves from sound and the resources needed for the plane. Chaka finds and frees the imprisoned children, whom Salamane reveals were used by Omar for his rituals. Souley is killed by the entities while Salamane is caught and killed by the vengeful children. Chaka and Rafa return to the Baobab, where both Younce and Sephora have died to the creatures; Minuit, still alive, is beyond saving, having let the entities affect him to hold them back with his spiritual powers. Rafa and Chaka wish a heartbroken farewell to him and mercy kill him. The two and Awa escape the resort by boat to start their journey back to the plane, having gathered the resources to fix it, but one of the entities, possessing Omar's body, drags Chaka down into the water, claiming that he will now take Omar's place. Rafa and Awa continue their escape by boat. They are swarmed by the entities but left unharmed.

== Cast ==
- Yann Gael as Chaka, the leader of the Hyenas of Bangui and a former child soldier. He uses the alias "Cheikh" while staying at the resort.
- Roger Sallah as Rafa, a member of the Hyenas of Bangui with a love for expensive items, using the alis "Rufin" at the resort.
- Mentor Ba as Papa Minuit, a member of the Hyenas of Bangui well-versed in the bwiti spiritual practice, using the alias "Maudou" at the resort.
- Evelyne Ily Juhen as Awa, a guest at the resort who is both deaf and mute
- Bruno Henry as Omar, an owner and host of the resort
- Marielle Salmier as Sephora, an artist and Younce's ex-girlfriend
- Babacar Oually as Salamane, Omar's trusted right-hand man
- Ndiaga Mbow as Captain Souleymane "Souley" Fale, a police captain from Dakar, who is a friend of Omar and a guest at the resort
- Cannabasse as Youce, an artist and Sephora's ex-boyfriend
- Renaud Farah as Felix, a Mexican drug lord who uses the alias "Felipe" at the resort.
- Alvina Karamoko as Narrator

== Reception ==
On the review aggregator website Rotten Tomatoes, 96% of 48 critics' reviews are positive, with an average rating of 7.6/10. The website's consensus reads: "Smart, dynamic, and fast-paced, Saloum mixes tones and genres into a tart, smoothly blended treat."

Jeanette Catsoulis reviewed the film positively in The New York Times, saying "The plot is ludicrously jam-packed, but the pace is fleet and the dialogue has wit and a carefree bounce". Richard Kuipers of Variety wrote that "[Saloum] freely mixes and marries the cinematic languages of spaghetti Westerns, samurai dramas and classic monster movies to tell an exciting and distinctly African story". Valerie Complex of Deadline Hollywood praised the film for its "supernatural horror elements", which, according to him also contain "comedy and suspense". In Vulture, Roxana Hadadi praised the film's cinematography, production, sound design, and folklore elements, and said the film's "only real disappointment is its visual effects, which once we see them aren't quite as frightening as what Saloum accomplished through suggestion".

According to Meagan Navarro of Bloody Disgusting, the film's "Spirituality, morality, mythology, and mysticism get thrown into a gritty crime thriller blender, culminating in a refreshingly unique type of genre-bender".
