= List of Deadlock Pro-Wrestling events =

This is a list of events held and promoted by Deadlock Pro-Wrestling, a professional wrestling promotion based in the United States which was founded by Anthony Douglas, James Darnell, and John Blud. Over the course of its history, it has held 55 major events. All of the events were streamed and made available on the company's streaming service, DPW On Demand.

== List of events ==
=== 2022 ===
Name	Date (taped)	Date (aired)	Venue	City	Main event	Ref
You Already Know	January 8, 2022	January 15, 2022	Raleigh Convention Center	Raleigh, North Carolina	Bojack vs. Andrew Everett for the inaugural DPW Worlds Championship	
Forever	April 16, 2022	April 23, 2022	Amran Shriners Building	Raleigh, North Carolina	Bojack (c) vs. Biff Busick for the DPW Worlds Championship	
No Pressure	June 5, 2022	June 11, 2022	Holshouser Building	Raleigh, North Carolina	Bojack (c) vs. Matt Cross for the DPW Worlds Championship	
Showdown In The Carolinas	July 10, 2022	July 16, 2022	Durham Armory	Durham, North Carolina	Calvin Tankman vs. Kevin Ku for the inaugural DPW National Championship	
Believe The Hype	August 6, 2022	August 13, 2022	Holshouser Building	Raleigh, North Carolina	Konosuke Takeshita vs. Andrew Everett	
Victory Lap	September 17, 2022	September 24, 2022	C3 At The Venue	Raleigh, North Carolina	Bojack (c) vs. Jay Malachi for the DPW Worlds Championship	
Carolina Classic	October 15, 2022	October 22, 2022	Durham Convention Center	Durham, North Carolina	Lucky Ali vs. Andrew Everett vs. Mike Bailey vs. SB Kento in a Four-way elimination match	
World's Strongest	November 12, 2022	November 19, 2022	Cabarrus Arena	Concord, North Carolina	Bojack (c) vs. Lucky Ali vs. Kidd Bandit for the DPW Worlds Championship	
1st Anniversary	December 10, 2022	December 17, 2022	Winston-Salem Fairgrounds	Winston-Salem, North Carolina	Calvin Tankman (c) vs. Andrew Everett for the DPW National Championship	

=== 2023 ===
Name	Date (taped)	Date (aired)	Venue	City	Main event	Ref
Live 1	January 14, 2023		Cabarrus Arena	Concord, North Carolina	Lucky Ali (c) vs. SB Kento for the DPW Worlds Championship	
You Already Know	February 25, 2023	March 4, 2023	Kerr Scott Building	Raleigh, North Carolina	Lucky Ali (c) vs. Colby Corino in a Title vs. Career Carolina Warfare match for the DPW Worlds Championship	
Forever	March 26, 2023	April 1, 2023	Durham Armory	Durham, North Carolina	Violence Is Forever (Dominic Garrini and Kevin Ku) (c) vs. The Workhorsemen (Anthony Henry and JD Drake) in a Steel Cage match for the DPW Worlds Tag Team Championship	
Live 2	April 16, 2023		Phil Sheridan Building	Ridgefield Park, New Jersey	Violence Is Forever (Dominic Garrini and Kevin Ku) (c) vs. Marcus Mathers and Matt Tremont in a Jersey Street Fight for the DPW Worlds Tag Team Championship	
DPW x Gatoh Move: Tokyo Crossover	April 25, 2023	May 7, 2023	Shin-Kiba 1st Ring	Tokyo, Japan	Violence Is Forever (Dominic Garrini and Kevin Ku) (c) vs. Calamari Drunken Kings (Chris Brookes and Masa Takanashi) for the DPW Worlds Tag Team Championship	
DPW x Gatoh Move: Tokyo Crossover	April 27, 2023	May 7, 2023	Shinjuku Face	Tokyo, Japan	Emi Sakura (c) vs. Miyuki Takase for the DPW Women's Worlds Championship	
DPW vs. Elevation Pro: Standing Room Only	May 20, 2023	June 1, 2023	Bull City Ciderworks	Lexington, North Carolina	Lucky Ali (c) vs. Jason Kincaid for the DPW Worlds Championship	
No Pressure	May 21, 2023	June 3, 2023	Durham Convention Center	Durham, North Carolina	Calvin Tankman vs. Bojack	
Tag Festival	June 18, 2023	June 24, 2023	Durham Armory	Durham, North Carolina	Violence Is Forever (Dominic Garrini and Kevin Ku) (c) vs. The Workhorsemen (Anthony Henry and JD Drake) vs. Best Bros (Baliyan Akki and Mei Suruga) vs. Above The Rest (Gabriel Skye and Tristen Thai) in a Four-way tag team elimination match for the DPW Worlds Tag Team Championship	
Beast Coast	August 13, 2023	August 19, 2023	Durham Armory	Durham, North Carolina	Violence Is Forever (Dominic Garrini and Kevin Ku) vs. The Motor City Machine Guns (Alex Shelley and Chris Sabin)	
Carolina Classic	September 17, 2023	September 23, 2023	Durham Armory	Durham, North Carolina	Lucky Ali (c) vs. Jay Malachi in a Carolina Warfare match for the DPW Worlds Championship	
Live 3	October 15, 2023		Phil Sheridan Building	Ridgefield Park, New Jersey	Colby Corino vs. Krule in a Last Man Standing match	
World's Strongest	November 12, 2023	November 18, 2023	Durham Armory	Durham, North Carolina	Jay Malachi (c) vs. Alec Price for the DPW Worlds Championship	
2nd Anniversary	December 10, 2023	December 16, 2023	Durham Convention Center	Durham, North Carolina	Emi Sakura (c) vs. Miyuki Takase for the DPW Women's Worlds Championship	

=== 2024 ===
Name	Date (taped)	Date (aired)	Venue	City	Main event	Ref
Live 4	January 20, 2024		Kerr Scott Building	Raleigh, North Carolina	Calvin Tankman (c) vs. Andrew Everett for the DPW Worlds Championship	
You Already Know	January 21, 2024	January 28, 2024	Kerr Scott Building	Raleigh, North Carolina	Calvin Tankman (c) vs. Colby Corino in a Steel Cage match for the DPW Worlds Championship	
Forever	February 18, 2024	February 24, 2024	Campbell Hall	Pasadena, Texas	Bryan Keith (c) vs. Jake Something for the DPW National Championship	
Live 5	March 10, 2024		Berwyn Eagles Club	Berwyn, Illinois	Bryan Keith (c) vs. Anthony Henry for the DPW National Championship	
No Pressure	April 14, 2024	April 20, 2024	Durham Convention Center	Durham, North Carolina	Calvin Tankman (c) vs. Mike Bailey for the DPW Worlds Championship	
Limit Break	May 19, 2024	May 25, 2024	Durham Convention Center	Durham, North Carolina	Calvin Tankman (c) vs. Kevin Ku for the DPW Worlds Championship	
Live 6	June 16, 2024		Logan Square Auditorium	Chicago, Illinois	Calvin Tankman (c) vs. Alex Shelley for the DPW Worlds Championship	
Live 7	July 6, 2024		Kerr Scott Building	Raleigh, North Carolina	Speedball x Something (Mike Bailey and Jake Something) (c) vs. Calvin Tankman and Titus Alexander for the DPW Worlds Tag Team Championship	
Tag Festival	July 7, 2024	July 13, 2024	Kerr Scott Building	Raleigh, North Carolina	Miracle Generation (Dustin Waller and Kylon King) vs. MxM (Mason Madden and Mansoor) vs. Grizzled Young Veterans (James Drake and Zack Gibson) vs. Violence Is Forever (Dominic Garrini and Kevin Ku) in a Tag Festival Tournament final Four-way tag team elimination match	
Untouchable	July 20, 2024		United Irish Culture Center	San Francisco, California	Shelton Benjamin vs. Titus Alexander	
High Noon	August 18, 2024	August 24, 2024	Campbell Hall	Pasadena, Texas	Speedball x Something (Mike Bailey and Jake Something) (c) vs. ABC (Ace Austin and Chris Bey) for the DPW Worlds Tag Team Championship	
Carolina Classic	September 15, 2024	September 22, 2024	Durham Convention Center	Durham, North Carolina	Jake Something vs. LaBron Kozone vs. Luke Jacobs vs. Mike Bailey in a Carolina Classic Tournament final Four-way elimination match	
Roseland 9	September 29, 2024		Roseland Theater	Portland, Oregon	Alan Angels (c) vs. Mustafa Ali for the Prestige World Championship	
Super Battle	October 13, 2024	October 19, 2024	Grady Cole Center	Charlotte, North Carolina	Calvin Tankman (c) vs. Jake Something for the DPW Worlds Championship	
World's Strongest	November 17, 2024	November 24, 2024	White Eagle Hall	Jersey City, New Jersey	Jake Something (c) vs. Donovan Dijak for the DPW Worlds Championship	
3rd Anniversary	December 8, 2024	December 17, 2024	Durham Convention Center	Durham, North Carolina	Adam Priest (c) vs. LaBron Kozone for the DPW National Championship	

=== 2025 ===
Name	Date (taped)	Date (aired)	Venue	City	Main event	Ref
You Already Know	January 17, 2025	January 21, 2025	The Mecca	Ridgefield Park, New Jersey	Jake Something (c) vs. Ace Austin for the DPW Worlds Championship	
Title Fight in Texas	January 26, 2025	February 2, 2025	Campbell Hall	Pasadena, Texas	Miyuki Takase (c) vs. Dani Luna for the DPW Women's Worlds Championship	
No Pressure	February 16, 2025	February 23, 2025	Logan Square Auditorium	Chicago, Illinois	Dani Luna (c) vs. Hyan in a Chicago Street Fight for the DPW Women's Worlds Championship	
Forever	March 16, 2025	March 23, 2025	Durham Armory	Durham, North Carolina	Dani Luna (c) vs. Hyan in a Dog Collar match for the DPW Women's Worlds Championship	
Title Fight in Vegas	April 18, 2025	April 23, 2025	MEET Las Vegas	Las Vegas, Nevada	Ultimate Conflict match for the vacant DPW Worlds Championship	
Spirit Rising	April 24, 2025	May 10, 2025	Shinjuku Face	Tokyo, Japan	Dani Luna (c) vs. Rika Tatsumi for the DPW Women's Worlds Championship	
Spirit Rising	April 25, 2025	May 11, 2025	Shin-Kiba 1st Ring	Tokyo, Japan	LaBron Kozone (c) vs. Takuya Nomura for the DPW National Championship	
Limit Break	May 18, 2025	May 25, 2025	Durham Armory	Durham, North Carolina	Trevor Lee and Adam Priest vs. LaBron Kozone and Colby Corino	
Unit3d	June 1, 2025		Vermont Hollywood	Los Angeles, California	Cowboy Way (1 Called Manders and Thomas Shire) (c) vs. Sinner and Saint (Judas Icarus and Travis Williams) for the West Coast Pro Tag Team Championship	
Victory Lap	June 15, 2025	June 22, 2025	Durham Armory	Durham, North Carolina	Adam Priest (c) vs. Calvin Tankman for the DPW Worlds Championship	
Tag Festival	July 13, 2025	July 20, 2025	Durham Convention Center	Durham, North Carolina	Grizzled Young Veterans (James Drake and Zack Gibson) (c) vs. Miracle Generation (Dustin Waller and Kylon King) vs. The Beast Mortos and Jake Something vs. The Workhorsemen (JD Drake and Anthony Henry) in a Tag Festival Tournament final Four-way tag team elimination match for the DPW Worlds Tag Team Championship	
Cruel Summer	July 26, 2025		United Irish Cultural Center	San Francisco, California	Kevin Blackwood (c) vs. Cedric Alexander in a Two out of three falls match for the West Coast Pro Heavyweight Championship	
Showdown in Cary	August 8, 2025	August 17, 2025	SportHQ	Cary, North Carolina	Adam Priest (c) vs. Anthony Henry for the DPW Worlds Championship	
Beast Coast	August 10, 2025	August 23, 2025	White Eagle Hall	Jersey City, New Jersey	Adam Priest (c) vs. Jake Something for the DPW Worlds Championship	
Carolina Classic	September 14, 2025	September 21, 2025	Durham Armory	Durham, North Carolina	Jake Something vs. Calvin Tankman vs. LaBron Kozone vs. Trevor Lee in the Carolina Classic tournament final	
Super Battle	October 19, 2025	October 26, 2025	Grady Cole Center	Charlotte, North Carolina	Adam Priest (c) vs. Jake Something in a Steel Cage match for the DPW Worlds Championship	
Showdown in Cary II	November 7, 2025	November 16, 2025	SportHQ	Cary, North Carolina	LaBron Kozone vs. Jake Something in a Champion vs. Champion match	
4th Anniversary	December 12, 2025	December 21, 2025	SportHQ	Cary, North Carolina	Jake Something (Worlds) vs. LaBron Kozone (National) in a Winner Takes All match for the DPW Worlds Championship and DPW National Championship	

== Results ==
=== You Already Know (2022) ===
You Already Know (2022)
- Promotion: Deadlock Pro-Wrestling
- Date: January 8, 2022 (aired January 15, 2022)
- City: Raleigh, North Carolina
- Venue: Raleigh Convention Center

Pay-per-view chronology
← Previous; First	Next → Forever (2022)

You Already Know chronology
← Previous; First	Next → You Already Know (2023)

You Already Know (2022) was a professional wrestling internet pay-per-view (iPPV) held in Raleigh, North Carolina at the Raleigh Convention Center on January 15, 2022. It was DPW's first major event and the first event under the You Already Know chronology, where the main event featured Bojack and Andrew Everett competing in a tournament final for the DPW Worlds Championship. Commentary was provided by the company's founders Anthony Douglas, James Darnell and John Blud. This show aired on DPW On Demand on January 8, 2022.

No.	Results	Stipulations	Times
1^{P}	Mikey Banker (with Josh Fuller) defeated Aaron Cox	Singles match	8:36
2^{P}	TSF (Hunter Knott and Rosario Grillo) defeated The NDA (Chance Rizer and Mason Myles) (with Chris Danger)	Tag team match	7:26
3	Kidd Bandit defeated Ho Ho Lun	Singles match	7:32
4	Lucky Ali defeated Diego Hill and Donnie Ray	Three-way match	7:06
5	KZT defeated Raychell Rose	Singles match	7:58
6	Sawyer Wreck defeated BK Westbrook, Calibus Kingston, Josh Fuller, Kat Spencer, Luther, Skyler Mack, Tenshi X, Will Wolfen and Yoscifer	Battle Royal	—
7	Colby Corino defeated Gringo Loco	Hardcore match	16:08
8	Calvin Tankman defeated Blake Christian	Singles match	16:11
9	Ryo Mizunami defeated Yuu	Singles match	14:04
10	Bojack defeated Andrew Everett	Tournament final for the inaugural DPW Worlds Championship	21:57
P / – the match was broadcast on the pre-show

=== Forever (2022) ===
Forever (2022)
- Promotion: Deadlock Pro-Wrestling
- Date: April 16, 2022 (aired April 23, 2022)
- City: Raleigh, North Carolina
- Venue: Amran Shriners Building

Pay-per-view chronology
← Previous; You Already Know (2022)	Next → No Pressure (2022)

Forever chronology
← Previous; First	Next → Forever (2023)

Forever (2022) was a professional wrestling internet pay-per-view (iPPV) held in Raleigh, North Carolina at the Amran Shriners Building on April 16, 2022. It was the first event under the Forever chronology. The event saw The NDA (Chance Rizer and Patrick Scott) and The Workhorsemen (Anthony Henry and JD Drake) compete for the inaugural DPW Worlds Tag Team Championship. Commentary was provided by the company's founders Anthony Douglas, James Darnell and John Blud. This show aired on DPW On Demand on April 23, 2022.

No.	Results	Stipulations	Times
1^{P}	Mason Myles defeated Aaron Cox and James Ryan	Three-way match	5:47
2^{P}	KZT defeated AleXevion, Jet Jaghori, Josh Fuller, Mikey Banker, Skyler Mack, Tenshi X, Will Wolfen and Yoscifer	Battle Royal	14:02
3^{P}	Savannah Evans defeated Heidi Howitzer	DPW Women's Worlds Championship Tournament Quarter Final match	7:20
4	Diego Hill defeated Andrew Everett, BK Westbrook and Gringo Loco	Four-way match	9:50
5	Kidd Bandit defeated Lucky Ali	Singles match	13:03
6	Jay Malachi defeated World Famous CB	Singles match	11:15
7	Colby Corino defeated Donnie Ray	Hardcore match	18:57
8	Rosemary defeated Hiroyo Matsumoto	DPW Women's Worlds Championship Tournament Quarter Final match	14:38
9	The NDA (Chance Rizer and Patrick Scott) (with Chris Danger) defeated The Workhorsemen (Anthony Henry and JD Drake)	Tag team match for the inaugural DPW Worlds Tag Team Championship	20:53
10	Bojack (c) defeated Biff Busick	Singles match for the DPW Worlds Championship	15:14
(c) / – the champion(s) heading into the match; P / – the match was broadcast on the pre-show

=== No Pressure (2022) ===
No Pressure (2022)
- Promotion: Deadlock Pro-Wrestling
- Date: June 5, 2022 (aired June 11, 2022)
- City: Raleigh, North Carolina
- Venue: Holshouser Building

Pay-per-view chronology
← Previous; Forever (2022)	Next → Showdown In The Carolinas

No Pressure chronology
← Previous; First	Next → No Pressure (2023)

No Pressure (2022) was a professional wrestling internet pay-per-view (iPPV) held in Raleigh, North Carolina at the Holshouser Building on June 5, 2022. It was the first event under the No Pressure chronology. The event saw Miyu Yamashita and Miyuki Takase competing against one another for the first time ever. The event included a training seminar hosted by Chris Hero. Commentary was provided by the company's founders Anthony Douglas, James Darnell and John Blud. This show aired on DPW On Demand on June 11, 2022.

No.	Results	Stipulations	Times
1	Alex Coughlin defeated JD Drake	Singles match	12:01
2	Kevin Ku defeated Mason Myles	DPW National Championship Tournament Semi Final match	12:15
3	The NDA (Chance Rizer and Patrick Scott) (c) (with Chris Danger) defeated Chase Holliday and Shawn Kemp	Tag team match for the DPW Worlds Tag Team Championship	11:49
4	Andrew Everett, Donnie Ray and Kidd Bandit defeated BK Westbrook, Jay Malachi and Lucky Ali	Six-man tag team match	20:21
5	Calvin Tankman defeated Colby Corino	DPW National Championship Tournament Semi Final match	10:35
6	Miyu Yamashita defeated Miyuki Takase	Singles match for a Golden Opportunity	15:27
7	Bojack (c) defeated Matt Cross	Singles match for the DPW Worlds Championship	11:51
(c) / – the champion(s) heading into the match

=== Showdown In The Carolinas ===
Showdown In The Carolinas
- Promotion: Deadlock Pro-Wrestling
- Date: July 10, 2022 (aired July 16, 2022)
- City: Durham, North Carolina
- Venue: Durham Armory

Pay-per-view chronology
← Previous; No Pressure	Next → Believe The Hype

Showdown In The Carolinas was a professional wrestling internet pay-per-view (iPPV) event that took place in Durham, North Carolina at the Durham Armory on July 10, 2022. The event saw Calvin Tankman and Kevin Ku competing for the inaugural DPW National Championship. Commentary was provided by the company's founders Anthony Douglas, James Darnell and John Blud. This show aired on DPW On Demand on July 16, 2022.

No.	Results	Stipulations	Times
1	Donnie Ray defeated Adam Priest, Diego Hill, James Ryan, LaBron Kozone and Mason Myles	Six-way match	6:50
2	Kidd Bandit defeated Sawyer Wreck	Singles match for a Golden Opportunity	7:43
3	The Workhorsemen (Anthony Henry and JD Drake) defeated Chase Holliday and Shawn Kemp	Tag team match	13:29
4	Raychell Rose defeated Promise Braxton	DPW Women's Worlds Championship Tournament Semi Final match	11:28
5	Colby Corino defeated Krule	Hardcore match	9:30
6	Bojack and Jay Malachi defeated Lucky Ali and BK Westbrook	Tag team match	13:45
7	Rosemary defeated Savannah Evans	DPW Women's Worlds Championship Tournament Semi Final match	11:09
8	The NDA (Chance Rizer and Patrick Scott) (c) (with Chris Danger) defeated Injustice (Jordan Oliver and Myron Reed)	Tag team match for the DPW Worlds Tag Team Championship	11:25
9	Calvin Tankman defeated Kevin Ku	Tournament final for the inaugural DPW National Championship	22:30
(c) / – the champion(s) heading into the match

=== Believe The Hype ===
Believe The Hype
- Promotion: Deadlock Pro-Wrestling
- Date: August 6, 2022 (aired August 13, 2022)
- City: Raleigh, North Carolina
- Venue: Holshouser Building

Pay-per-view chronology
← Previous; Showdown In The Carolinas	Next → Victory Lap (2022)

Believe The Hype was a professional wrestling internet pay-per-view (iPPV) event that took place in Raleigh, North Carolina at the Holshouser Building on August 6, 2022. This event saw Raychell Rose and Rosemary competing for the inaugural DPW Women's Worlds Championship and the main event between Konosuke Takeshita and Andrew Everett. Commentary was provided by the company's founders Anthony Douglas, James Darnell and John Blud. This show aired on DPW On Demand on August 13, 2022.

No.	Results	Stipulations	Times
1	Bojack (c) defeated Donnie Ray	Singles match for the DPW Worlds Championship	13:47
2	Jay Malachi defeated Chase Holliday, Joe Lando, Lucky Ali and Shawn Kemp	Five-way match	8:13
3	Emi Sakura defeated Mizuki	Singles match	11:02
4	Calvin Tankman (c) defeated Baliyan Akki	Singles match for the DPW National Championship	11:31
5	Mason Myles and The Workhorsemen (Anthony Henry and JD Drake) defeated Alec Price and The NDA (Chance Rizer and Patrick Scott)	Six-man tag team match	17:53
6	Gringo Loco defeated ASF and La Estrella	Three-way match	10:18
7	Raychell Rose defeated Rosemary	Tournament final for the inaugural DPW Women's Worlds Championship	15:15
8	Dante Martin defeated Diego Hill	Singles match	7:30
9	Konosuke Takeshita defeated Andrew Everett	Singles match	18:41
(c) / – the champion(s) heading into the match

=== Victory Lap (2022) ===
Victory Lap (2022)
- Promotion: Deadlock Pro-Wrestling
- Date: September 17, 2022 (aired September 24, 2022)
- City: Raleigh, North Carolina
- Venue: C3 At The Venue

Pay-per-view chronology
← Previous; Believe The Hype	Next → Carolina Classic (2022)

Victory Lap chronology
← Previous; First	Next → Victory Lap (2025)

Victory Lap was a professional wrestling internet pay-per-view (iPPV) event that took place in Raleigh, North Carolina at C3 At The Venue on September 17, 2022. Commentary was provided by the company's founders Anthony Douglas, James Darnell and John Blud, which was the last time the three would do so. This show aired on DPW On Demand on September 24, 2022.

No.	Results	Stipulations	Times
1	Shun Skywalker defeated Jack Evans and SB Kento	Three-way match	11:25
2	KZT defeated Sumie Sakai	Singles match	8:50
3	The NDA (Chance Rizer and Patrick Scott) (c) (with Chris Danger) defeated Waves And Curls (Jaylen Brandyn and Traevon Jordan)	Tag team match for the DPW Worlds Tag Team Championship	10:56
4	Colby Corino, Diego Hill, Donnie Ray and Mason Myles defeated BK Westbrook, Jaden Newman, James Ryan and Zoey Skye	Eight-man tag team match	14:51
5	Lucky Ali defeated B-Boy	Singles match	8:59
6	The Workhorsemen (Anthony Henry and JD Drake) vs. Violence Is Forever (Dominic Garrini and Kevin Ku) ended in a time limit draw	Tag team match	20:00
7	Jungle Kyona defeated Maya Yukihi	Singles match	14:48
8	Bojack (c) defeated Jay Malachi	Singles match for the DPW Worlds Championship	18:31
(c) / – the champion(s) heading into the match

=== Carolina Classic (2022) ===
Carolina Classic (2022)
- Promotion: Deadlock Pro-Wrestling
- Date: October 15, 2022 (aired October 22, 2022)
- City: Durham, North Carolina
- Venue: Durham Convention Center

Pay-per-view chronology
← Previous; Victory Lap (2022)	Next → World's Strongest (2022)

Carolina Classic chronology
← Previous; First	Next → Carolina Classic (2023)

Carolina Classic 2022 was a professional wrestling internet pay-per-view (iPPV) event that took place in Durham, North Carolina at the Durham Convention Center on October 15, 2022. The event featured a one night 8-man tournament. Commentary was provided by Joe Dombrowski and Rich Bocchini. This show aired on DPW On Demand on October 22, 2022.

No.	Results	Stipulations	Times
1	Andrew Everett defeated Shun Skywalker by pinfall	Carolina Classic First Round match	10:25
2	SB Kento defeated BK Westbrook by pinfall	Carolina Classic First Round match	07:54
3	Lucky Ali defeated Yuya Uemura by pinfall	Carolina Classic First Round match	10:39
4	Mike Bailey defeated Colby Corino by pinfall	Carolina Classic First Round match	12:09
5	Sumie Sakai and Jungle Kyona defeated Hyan and Janai Kai by pinfall	Tag team match	13:19
6	Alec Price defeated La Estrella and Yoya by pinfall	Three-way match	5:47
7	Emi Sakura defeated Mei Suruga by pinfall	Singles match	15:47
8	Bojack, Donnie Ray and Mason Myles defeated Jay Malachi, Diego Hill, and LaBron Kozone by pinfall	Six-man tag team match	19:11
9	Lucky Ali defeated Mike Bailey, SB Kento and Andrew Everett by pinfall	Carolina Classic Tournament final Four-way elimination match	17:47

=== World's Strongest (2022) ===
World's Strongest (2022)
- Promotion: Deadlock Pro-Wrestling
- Date: November 12, 2022 (aired November 19, 2022)
- City: Concord, North Carolina
- Venue: Cabarrus Arena

Pay-per-view chronology
← Previous; Carolina Classic (2022)	Next → 1st Anniversary

World's Strongest chronology
← Previous; First	Next → World's Strongest (2023)

World's Strongest (2022) was a professional wrestling internet pay-per-view (iPPV) event that took place in Concord, North Carolina at the Cabarrus Arena on November 12, 2022. Commentary was provided by Joe Dombrowski and Rich Bocchini. This show aired on DPW On Demand on November 19, 2022.

No.	Results	Stipulations	Times
1^{P}	Chance Rizer (with Chris Danger) defeated Hunter Raynor	Singles match	6:35
2^{P}	Adam Priest defeated Alexander Moss and Manny Lo	Three-way match	6:15
3	SB Kento defeated LaBron Kozone	Singles match	8:03
4	Sumie Sakai defeated Hyan	Singles match	8:45
5	Adam Priest defeated Jackson Drake	Singles match	14:00
6	The Workhorsemen (Anthony Henry and JD Drake) defeated Donnie Ray and Mason Myles	Tag team match	15:10
7	Jay Malachi defeated BK Westbrook	Singles match	12:07
8	Raychell Rose (c) defeated KZT	Singles match for the DPW Women's Worlds Championship	12:05
9	Andrew Everett and Miyuki Takase defeated Best Bros (Baliyan Akki and Mei Suruga)	Tag team match	15:26
10	Emi Sakura defeated Jungle Kyona	Singles match to determine the #1 contender to the DPW Women's Worlds Championship	12:32
11	Lucky Ali defeated Bojack (c) and Kidd Bandit	Three-way match for the DPW Worlds Championship; This was Bandit's Golden Opportunity cash-in match.	16:52
(c) / – the champion(s) heading into the match; P / – the match was broadcast on the pre-show

=== 1st Anniversary ===
1st Anniversary
- Promotion: Deadlock Pro-Wrestling
- Date: December 10, 2022 (aired December 17, 2022)
- City: Winston-Salem, North Carolina
- Venue: Winston-Salem Fairgrounds

Pay-per-view chronology
← Previous; World's Strongest	Next → Live 1

Anniversary chronology
← Previous; First	Next → 2nd Anniversary

1st Anniversary was a professional wrestling internet pay-per-view (iPPV) event that took place in Winston-Salem, North Carolina at the Winston-Salem Fairgrounds on December 10, 2022. The event was a celebration of DPW's one year anniversary. Commentary was provided by Rich Bocchini. This show aired on DPW On Demand on December 17, 2022.

No.	Results	Stipulations	Times
1^{P}	Donnie Ray and Mason Myles defeated Alexander Moss and Manny Lo	Tag team match	7:48
2^{P}	Baliyan Akki (c) defeated Cole Radrick	Singles match for the Super Asia Championship	6:57
3	Adam Brooks defeated LaBron Kozone	Singles match	10:43
4	Jay Malachi defeated Diego Hill	Singles match	11:17
5	Hyan defeated BK Westbrook	Singles match	9:11
6	Emi Sakura defeated Raychell Rose (c)	Singles match for the DPW Women's Worlds Championship	10:18
7	Lucky Ali (c) defeated Bojack	Singles match for the DPW Worlds Championship	16:46
8	Konosuke Takeshita defeated Colby Corino	Singles match	14:22
9	Violence Is Forever (Dominic Garrini and Kevin Ku) defeated The NDA (Chance Rizer and Patrick Scott) (c) (with Chris Danger)	Tag team match for the DPW Worlds Tag Team Championship	19:47
10	Andrew Everett defeated Calvin Tankman (c)	Singles match for the DPW National Championship	21:09
(c) / – the champion(s) heading into the match; P / – the match was broadcast on the pre-show

=== Live 1 ===
Live 1
- Promotion: Deadlock Pro-Wrestling
- Date: January 14, 2023
- City: Concord, North Carolina
- Venue: Cabarrus Arena

Pay-per-view chronology
← Previous; 1st Anniversary	Next → You Already Know (2023)

Live chronology
← Previous; First	Next → Live 2

Live 1 (also known as Live: Ali vs. KENTo) was a professional wrestling internet pay-per-view (iPPV) event that took place in Concord, North Carolina at the Cabarrus Arena on January 14, 2023. The event was DPW's first show held live and the first event under the Live chronology. Commentary was provided by Rich Bocchini.

No.	Results	Stipulations	Times
1	LaBron Kozone defeated Jaden Newman	Singles match	12:22
2	Queen Aminata defeated Jada Stone	Singles match	7:06
3	Alexander Moss defeated Manny Lo	Singles match	7:33
4	Jay Malachi defeated Bojack, Oliver Sawyer and Yoya	Four-way match	10:48
5	Colby Corino defeated Kevin Ku	Singles match	14:38
6	JD Drake defeated Arik Royal and Noah Hossman	Three-way match	10:23
7	Lucky Ali (c) defeated SB Kento	Singles match for the DPW Worlds Championship	21:01
(c) / – the champion(s) heading into the match

=== You Already Know (2023) ===
You Already Know (2023)
- Promotion: Deadlock Pro-Wrestling
- Date: February 25, 2023 (aired March 4, 2023)
- City: Raleigh, North Carolina
- Venue: Kerr Scott Building

Pay-per-view chronology
← Previous; Live 1	Next → Forever (2023)

You Already Know chronology
← Previous; You Already Know (2022)	Next → You Already Know (2024)

You Already Know (2023) was a professional wrestling internet pay-per-view (iPPV) event that took place in Raleigh, North Carolina at the Kerr Scott Building on February 25, 2023. It was the second event under the You Already Know chronology. The event featured a defense of the Princess Tag Team Championship for the first time in the United States of America, a 25-year rematch between Emi Sakura and Sumie Sakai, and a Title vs. Career match between Lucky Ali and Colby Corino. Commentary was provided by Rich Bocchini. This show aired on DPW On Demand on March 4, 2023.

No.	Results	Stipulations	Times
1^{P}	Jackson Drake defeated Oliver Sawyer	Singles match	8:32
2^{P}	Alexander Moss defeated Donnie Ray (with Mason Myles)	Singles match	9:17
3^{P}	Manny Lo defeated Alexander Moss	Singles match	0:06
4	Andrew Everett (c) defeated Mason Myles	Singles match for the DPW National Championship	10:53
5	Wasteland War Party (Heidi Howitzer and Max the Impaler) (c) defeated Jada Stone and Raychell Rose	Tag team match for the Princess Tag Team Championship	10:30
6	Jay Malachi and LaBron Kozone defeated Adam Brooks and BK Westbrook	Tag team match	18:06
7	Emi Sakura (c) defeated Sumie Sakai	Singles match for the DPW Women's Worlds Championship	14:04
8	Violence Is Forever (Dominic Garrini and Kevin Ku) (c) defeated Above The Rest (Gabriel Skye and Tristen Thai) and MSP (Aiden Aggro and The DangerKid)	Three-way tag team match for the DPW Worlds Tag Team Championship	17:55
9	Lucky Ali (c) defeated Colby Corino	Title vs. Career Carolina Warfare match for the DPW Worlds Championship	34:09
(c) / – the champion(s) heading into the match; P / – the match was broadcast on the pre-show

=== Forever (2023) ===
Forever (2023)
- Promotion: Deadlock Pro-Wrestling
- Date: March 26, 2023 (aired April 1, 2023)
- City: Durham, North Carolina
- Venue: Durham Armory

Pay-per-view chronology
← Previous; You Already Know (2023)	Next → Live 2

Forever chronology
← Previous; Forever (2022)	Next → Forever (2024)

Forever (2023) (also known as Forever: Steel Cage Showdown) was a professional wrestling internet pay-per-view (iPPV) event that took place in Durham, North Carolina at the Durham Armory on March 26, 2023. It was the second event under the Forever chronology. The event featured the first ever Steel Cage match in DPW. Commentary was provided by Rich Bocchini and Caprice Coleman. This show aired on DPW On Demand on April 1, 2023.

No.	Results	Stipulations	Times
1^{P}	Oliver Sawyer defeated Donnie Ray, Drew Adler, Hunter Drake and Mason Myles	Five-way match	4:38
2^{P}	MSP (Aiden Aggro and The DangerKid) defeated The VeloCities (Jude London and Paris De Silva)	Tag team match	8:57
3^{P}	Alexander Moss vs. Manny Lo ended in a no contest	Singles match	—
4	Jackson Drake defeated Adam Priest	Singles match	9:06
5	Hyan defeated Jada Stone and Raychell Rose	Three-way match	8:07
6	Calvin Tankman defeated Kevin Knight and Myron Reed	Three-way match	13:06
7	Adam Brooks, BK Westbrook and Lucky Ali defeated Andrew Everett, Jay Malachi and LaBron Kozone 2-1 •First Fall: Brooks defeated Everett (1–0) •Second Fall: Kozone defeated Westbrook (1–1) •Third Fall: Ali defeated Malachi (2–1)	Two out of three falls six-man tag team match	33:49
8	Violence Is Forever (Dominic Garrini and Kevin Ku) (c) defeated The Workhorsemen (Anthony Henry and JD Drake)	Steel Cage match for the DPW Worlds Tag Team Championship	17:42
(c) / – the champion(s) heading into the match; P / – the match was broadcast on the pre-show

=== Live 2 ===
Live 2
- Promotion: Deadlock Pro-Wrestling
- Date: April 16, 2023
- City: Ridgefield Park, New Jersey
- Venue: Phil Sheridan Building

Pay-per-view chronology
← Previous; Forever (2023)	Next → DPW x Gatoh Move: Tokyo Crossover

Live chronology
← Previous; Live 1	Next → Live 3

Live 2 was a professional wrestling internet pay-per-view (iPPV) event that took place in Ridgefield Park, New Jersey at the Phil Sheridan Building on April 16, 2023. The event was DPW's second show held live and the first to take place outside of North Carolina. It was the second event under the Live chronology. Commentary was provided by Rich Bocchini and Phil Stamper.

No.	Results	Stipulations	Times
1	MSP (Aiden Aggro and The DangerKid) defeated Above The Rest (Gabriel Skye and Tristen Thai)	Tag team match to determine the #1 contender to the DPW Worlds Tag Team Championship	11:38
2	Adam Priest defeated Bojack, Diego Hill and LaBron Kozone	Four-way match	8:32
3	Janai Kai defeated B3cca	Singles match	10:03
4	Jay Malachi defeated Alec Price and Jackson Drake	Golden Opportunity Qualifier Three-way match	13:36
5	Andrew Everett (c) defeated BK Westbrook	Singles match for the DPW National Championship	14:39
6	Miyu Yamashita defeated Nicole Matthews	Singles match	13:24
7	Violence Is Forever (Dominic Garrini and Kevin Ku) (c) defeated Marcus Mathers and Matt Tremont	Jersey Street Fight for the DPW Worlds Tag Team Championship	27:06
(c) / – the champion(s) heading into the match

=== DPW x Gatoh Move: Tokyo Crossover ===
DPW x Gatoh Move: Tokyo Crossover
- Promotion(s): Deadlock Pro-Wrestling; Gatoh Move Pro Wrestling
- Date: April 25, 2023; April 27, 2023 (aired May 7, 2023)
- City: Tokyo
- Venue: Shin-Kiba 1st Ring; Shinjuku Face

Pay-per-view chronology
← Previous; Live 2	Next → DPW vs. Elevation Pro: Standing Room Only

DPW x Gatoh Move: Tokyo Crossover was a two night a joint professional wrestling event produced by Deadlock Pro-Wrestling and Gatoh Move Pro Wrestling which took place in Tokyo at Shin-Kiba 1st Ring on April 25, 2023, and Shinjuku Face on April 27, 2023. The event was DPW's first co-promoted show as well as their first show outside the United States of America. Both shows aired on DPW On Demand on May 7, 2023.

Night 1 (April 25)
No.	Results	Stipulations	Times
1	Mochi Natsumi defeated Miya Yotsuba	Singles match	8:37
2	Saki and Sayaka Obihiro defeated Antonio Honda and Tokiko Kirihara, and Choun Shiryu and Shin Suzuki	Three-way tag team match	7:02
3	Emi Sakura and Kaori Yoneyama vs. Luminous (Haruka Umesaki and Miyuki Takase) ended in a time limit draw	Tag team match	15:00
4	Baliyan Akki defeated Rina Yamashita	Singles match	13:18
5	Mei Suruga and Ryo Mizunami defeated Chie Koishikawa and Kaho Kobayashi	Tag team match	16:23
6	Violence Is Forever (Dominic Garrini and Kevin Ku) (c) defeated Calamari Drunken Kings (Chris Brookes and Masa Takanashi)	Tag team match for the DPW Worlds Tag Team Championship	17:20
(c) / – the champion(s) heading into the match

Night 2 (April 27)
No.	Results	Stipulations	Times
1	Antonio Honda, Choun Shiryu, Shin Suzuki and Tokiko Kirihara defeated Death Worm, KOJIO, Sayaka Obihiro and Tiger Jet Shinjuku	Eight-man tag team match	7:26
2	Hikari Shimizu and Saki defeated Ryo Mizunami and Sayaka	Tag team match	8:00
3	Minoru Fujita and Rina Yamashita defeated Chie Koishikawa and Hagane Shinno	Tag team match	13:54
4	Mei Suruga defeated Arisu Endo	Singles match	8:54
5	Baliyan Akki, Calamari Drunken Kings (Chris Brookes and Masa Takanashi) and Ken Ohka defeated Isami Kodaka, Masashi Takeda and Violence Is Forever (Dominic Garrini and Kevin Ku)	Eight-man tag team match	18:42
6	Emi Sakura (c) defeated Miyuki Takase	Singles match for the DPW Women's Worlds Championship	18:24
(c) / – the champion(s) heading into the match

=== DPW vs. Elevation Pro: Standing Room Only ===
DPW vs. Elevation Pro: Standing Room Only
- Promotion(s): Deadlock Pro-Wrestling; Elevation Pro Wrestling
- Date: May 20, 2023 (aired June 1, 2023)
- City: Lexington, North Carolina
- Venue: Bull City Ciderworks

Pay-per-view chronology
← Previous; DPW x Gatoh Move: Tokyo Crossover	Next → No Pressure (2023)

DPW vs. Elevation Pro: Standing Room Only was a joint professional wrestling event produced by Deadlock Pro-Wrestling and Elevation Pro Wrestling which took place in Lexington, North Carolina at the Bull City Ciderworks on May 20, 2023. The event was DPW's second co-promoted show. The show aired on YouTube on June 1, 2023.

No.	Results	Stipulations	Times
1	Yabba Dabba Daddy (EPW) defeated BK Westbrook (DPW), Diego Hill (DPW), LaBron Kozone (DPW) and Movie Myk (EPW)	Five-way match	9:10
2	Jackson Drake and Jay Malachi (DPW) defeated Viva Las Amish (Hezekiah Hoskins and Jebediah Hoskins) (EPW)	Tag team match	7:39
3	Savannah Evans defeated Kaitlyn Marie	Singles match	5:49
4	The Workhorsemen (Anthony Henry and JD Drake) defeated Donnie Ray and Mason Myles	Tag team match	16:45
5	Andrew Everett (c) (DPW) defeated Rob Killjoy (EPW)	Singles match for the DPW National Championship	10:51
6	TIM (c) (EPW) defeated Bojack (DPW)	Singles match for the Elevation Pro Championship	12:02
7	Lucky Ali (c) (DPW) defeated Jason Kincaid (EPW)	Singles match for the DPW Worlds Championship	16:49
(c) / – the champion(s) heading into the match

=== No Pressure (2023) ===
No Pressure (2023)
- Promotion: Deadlock Pro-Wrestling
- Date: May 21, 2023 (aired June 3, 2023)
- City: Durham, North Carolina
- Venue: Durham Convention Center

Pay-per-view chronology
← Previous; DPW vs. Elevation Pro: Standing Room Only	Next → Tag Festival (2023)

No Pressure chronology
← Previous; No Pressure (2022)	Next → No Pressure (2024)

No Pressure (2023) was a professional wrestling internet pay-per-view (iPPV) event that took place in Durham, North Carolina at the Durham Convention Center on May 21, 2023. It was the second event under the No Pressure chronology. Commentary was provided by Rich Bocchini and Caprice Coleman. This show aired on DPW On Demand on June 3, 2023.

No.	Results	Stipulations	Times
1^{P}	Alexander Moss defeated Mason Myles (with Donnie Ray and Manny Lo)	Singles match	6:10
2^{P}	LaBron Kozone defeated Diego Hill and Oliver Sawyer	Golden Opportunity Qualifier Three-way match	7:50
3^{P}	Krule defeated Hunter Raynor	Singles match	1:49
4	The Workhorsemen (Anthony Henry and JD Drake) defeated Miracle Generation (Dustin Waller and Kylon King)	Tag team match	10:54
5	Nicole Matthews defeated Jada Stone	Singles match	8:33
6	Jay Malachi defeated Myron Reed	Singles match	11:36
7	Lucky Ali (c) (with BK Westbrook) defeated Jackson Drake	Singles match for the DPW Worlds Championship	11:24
8	Bryan Keith defeated Kevin Blackwood	Singles match	13:05
9	Violence Is Forever (Dominic Garrini and Kevin Ku) (c) defeated MSP (Aiden Aggro and The DangerKid)	Tag team match for the DPW Worlds Tag Team Championship	14:29
10	Calvin Tankman defeated Bojack	Singles match	18:08
(c) / – the champion(s) heading into the match; P / – the match was broadcast on the pre-show

=== Tag Festival (2023) ===
Tag Festival (2023)
- Promotion: Deadlock Pro-Wrestling
- Date: June 18, 2023 (aired June 24, 2023)
- City: Durham, North Carolina
- Venue: Durham Armory

Pay-per-view chronology
← Previous; No Pressure (2023)	Next → Beast Coast

Tag Festival chronology
← Previous —	Next → Tag Festival (2024)

Tag Festival (2023) was a professional wrestling internet pay-per-view (iPPV) event that took place in Durham, North Carolina at the Durham Armory on June 18, 2023. The event featured a one night 8-team tournament. Commentary was provided by Rich Bocchini, Caprice Coleman and Veda Scott. The show aired on DPW On Demand on June 24, 2023.

No.	Results	Stipulations	Times
1	Violence Is Forever (Dominic Garrini and Kevin Ku) (c) defeated Miracle Generation (Dustin Waller and Kylon King) by pinfall	Tag Festival First Round match for the DPW Worlds Tag Team Championship	12:16
2	The Workhorsemen (JD Drake and Anthony Henry) defeated Jackson Drake and Jay Malachi by pinfall	Tag Festival First Round match	10:53
3	Above The Rest (Gabriel Skye and Tristen Thai) defeated MSP (Aiden Aggro and The DangerKid) by pinfall	Tag Festival First Round match	8:44
4	BestBros (Mei Suruga and Baliyan Akki) defeated International Giants (Andrew Everett and Miyuki Takase) by pinfall	Tag Festival First Round match	16:04
5	Mizuki and Emi Sakura (with Yuka Sakazaki) defeated Miyu Yamashita and VertVixen by pinfall	Tag team match	11:37
6	Lucky Ali (c) (with BK Westbrook) defeated Mike Bailey by pinfall	Singles match for the DPW Worlds Championship; Colby Corino served as the special outside enforcer.	22:38
7	The Workhorsemen (JD Drake and Anthony Henry) defeated Violence Is Forever (Dominic Garrini and Kevin Ku) (c), BestBros (Mei Suruga and Baliyan Akki) and Above The Rest (Gabriel Skye and Tristen Thai) by referee stoppage	Tag Festival Tournament final Four-way tag team elimination match for the DPW Worlds Tag Team Championship	28:16
(c) / – the champion(s) heading into the match

=== Beast Coast (2023) ===
Beast Coast (2023)
- Promotion: Deadlock Pro-Wrestling
- Date: August 13, 2023 (aired August 19, 2023)
- City: Durham, North Carolina
- Venue: Durham Armory

Pay-per-view chronology
← Previous; Tag Festival (2023)	Next → Carolina Classic (2023)

Beast Coast chronology
← Previous —	Next → Beast Coast (2025)

Beast Coast (2023) was a professional wrestling internet pay-per-view (iPPV) event that took place in Durham, North Carolina at the Durham Armory on August 13, 2023. Commentary was provided by Rich Bocchini and Caprice Coleman. The show aired on DPW On Demand August 13, 2023.

No.	Results	Stipulations	Times
1^{P}	Diego Hill defeated LaBron Kozone	Singles match	9:28
2^{P}	Lucky Ali defeated Robert Martyr	Proving Ground match Since Martyr did not last 10 minutes, he did not earn an opportunity to challenge for Ali's DPW Worlds Championship.	8:42
3	Calvin Tankman defeated Jay Malachi and Shigehiro Irie	Three-way match	10:21
4	Adam Priest defeated Jackson Drake	Submission match	9:07
5	The Workhorsemen (Anthony Henry and JD Drake) (c) defeated Double Kevin (Kevin Knight and Kevin Blackwood)	Tag team match for the DPW Worlds Tag Team Championship	14:31
6	Emi Sakura (c) defeated Killer Kelly	Singles match for the DPW Women's Worlds Championship	9:49
7	Bryan Keith defeated Andrew Everett (c)	Singles match for the DPW National Championship	17:18
8	The Motor City Machine Guns (Alex Shelley and Chris Sabin) defeated Violence Is Forever (Dominic Garrini and Kevin Ku)	Tag team match	20:54
(c) / – the champion(s) heading into the match; P / – the match was broadcast on the pre-show

=== Carolina Classic (2023) ===
Carolina Classic (2023)
- Promotion: Deadlock Pro-Wrestling
- Date: September 17, 2023 (aired September 23, 2023)
- City: Durham, North Carolina
- Venue: Durham Armory

Pay-per-view chronology
← Previous; Beast Coast	Next → Live 3

Carolina Classic chronology
← Previous; Carolina Classic (2022)	Next → —

Carolina Classic 2023 was a professional wrestling internet pay-per-view (iPPV) event that took place in Durham, North Carolina at the Durham Armory on September 17, 2023. Commentary was provided by Rich Bocchini, Caprice Coleman, and Veda Scott. The show aired on DPW On Demand on September 23, 2023.

No.	Results	Stipulations	Times
1	Jay Malachi defeated Ichiban	Carolina Classic First Round match	7:29
2	Jake Something defeated Myron Reed	Carolina Classic First Round match	9:24
3	Tom Lawlor defeated LaBron Kozone	Carolina Classic First Round match	15:01
4	Mike Bailey defeated Andrew Everett	Carolina Classic First Round match	14:02
5	Bryan Keith (c) defeated Shun Skywalker	Singles match for the DPW National Championship	13:53
6	Emi Sakura (c) defeated Nicole Matthews	Singles match for the DPW Women's Worlds Championship	12:03
7	Jay Malachi defeated Tom Lawlor, Jake Something and Mike Bailey	Carolina Classic Tournament final Four-way elimination match	27:46
8	Jay Malachi defeated Lucky Ali (c)	Carolina Warfare match for the DPW Worlds Championship	29:04
(c) / – the champion(s) heading into the match

=== Live 3 ===
Live 3
- Promotion: Deadlock Pro-Wrestling
- Date: October 15, 2023
- City: Ridgefield Park, New Jersey
- Venue: Phil Sheridan Building

Pay-per-view chronology
← Previous; Carolina Classic (2023)	Next → World's Strongest (2023)

Live chronology
← Previous; Live 2	Next → Live 4

Live 3 was a professional wrestling internet pay-per-view (iPPV) event that took place in Ridgefield Park, New Jersey at the Phil Sheridan Building on October 15, 2023. Commentary was provided by Rich Bocchini, Caprice Coleman, and Veda Scott. The event was DPW's third show held live and the third to take place outside of North Carolina. It was also the third event under the Live chronology.

No.	Results	Stipulations	Times
1	Alec Price and Miracle Generation (Dustin Waller and Kylon King) defeated Marcus Mathers and Above The Rest (Gabriel Skye and Tristen Thai)	Six-man tag team match	9:06
2	LaBron Kozone defeated Kevin Blackwood	Singles match	7:17
3	Masha Slamovich defeated Takumi Iroha and Mio Momono	Three-way match	9:06
4	Grizzled Young Veterans (James Drake and Zack Gibson) defeated The Workhorsemen (Anthony Henry and JD Drake)	Proving Ground Tag team match Since Grizzled Young Veterans did won the match, they did earn an opportunity to challenge for Workhorsemen's DPW Worlds Tag Team Championship.	12:46
5	Bryan Keith (c) defeated Dominic Garrini, Kevin Ku, and Mike Bailey	Four-way match for the DPW National Championship	19:02
6	Jay Malachi (c) defeated Jordan Oliver	Singles match for the DPW Worlds Championship	12:03
7	Colby Corino defeated Krule	Last Man Standing match	18:36
(c) / – the champion(s) heading into the match

=== World's Strongest (2023) ===
World's Strongest (2023)
- Promotion: Deadlock Pro-Wrestling
- Date: November 12, 2023 (aired November 18, 2023)
- City: Durham, North Carolina
- Venue: Durham Armory

Pay-per-view chronology
← Previous; Live 3	Next → 2nd Anniversary

World's Strongest chronology
← Previous; World's Strongest (2022)	Next → World's Strongest (2024)

World's Strongest (2023) was a professional wrestling internet pay-per-view (iPPV) event that took place in Durham, North Carolina at the Durham Armory on November 12, 2023. This event marked the in-ring debut of Chris Danger, who was originally scheduled to face Adam Cole before he broke his ankle at AEW Grand Slam. Commentary was provided by Rich Bocchini and Caprice Coleman. The show aired on DPW On Demand on November 18, 2023.

No.	Results	Stipulations	Times
1	Jake Something defeated Baliyan Akki and LaBron Kozone	Three-way match	9:30
2	Shawn Spears defeated Chris Danger	Singles match	14:34
3	Masato Tanaka, Bryan Keith and Calvin Tankman defeated Team Filthy (Tom Lawlor, Jorel Nelson and Royce Isaacs)	Six-man tag team match	15:21
4	Emi Sakura (c) defeated Masha Slamovich	Singles match for the DPW Women's Worlds Championship	13:34
5	The Workhorsemen (Anthony Henry and JD Drake) (c) defeated Grizzled Young Veterans (James Drake and Zack Gibson)	Tag team match for the DPW Worlds Tag Team Championship	18:49
6	Colby Corino defeated Lucky Ali	"I Quit" match	25:43
7	Jay Malachi (c) defeated Alec Price	Singles match for the DPW Worlds Championship	23:57
(c) / – the champion(s) heading into the match

=== 2nd Anniversary ===
2nd Anniversary
- Promotion: Deadlock Pro-Wrestling
- Date: December 10, 2023 (aired December 16, 2023)
- City: Durham, North Carolina
- Venue: Durham Armory

Pay-per-view chronology
← Previous; World's Strongest (2023)	Next → Live 4

Anniversary chronology
← Previous; 1st Anniversary	Next → 3rd Anniversary

2nd Anniversary was a professional wrestling internet pay-per-view (iPPV) event that took place in Durham, North Carolina at the Durham Armory on December 10, 2023. The event was a celebration of DPW's two year anniversary. Commentary was provided by Rich Bocchini, Caprice Coleman, and Veda Scott. The show aired on DPW On Demand on December 16, 2023.

No.	Results	Stipulations	Times
1	LaBron Kozone and Violence Is Forever (Dominic Garrini and Kevin Ku) defeated Team Filthy (Tom Lawlor, Jorel Nelson and Royce Isaacs)	Six-man tag team match	10:15
2	Nicole Matthews defeated Yuu	Singles match	10:52
3	Jake Something and Mike Bailey defeated Titus Alexander and Bryan Keith	Tag team match	15:36
4	Andrew Everett defeated BK Westbrook	No Holds Barred match	25:32
5	Bojack defeated Oliver Sawyer	Singles match	0:43
6	The Motor City Machine Guns (Alex Shelley and Chris Sabin) defeated The Workhorsemen (Anthony Henry and JD Drake) (c)	Tag team match for the DPW Worlds Tag Team Championship	15:53
7	Calvin Tankman defeated Colby Corino	Singles match for the vacant DPW Worlds Championship	14:57
8	Miyuki Takase defeated Emi Sakura (c)	Singles match for the DPW Women's Worlds Championship	16:38
(c) / – the champion(s) heading into the match

=== Live 4 ===
Live 4
- Promotion: Deadlock Pro-Wrestling
- Date: January 20, 2024
- City: Raleigh, North Carolina
- Venue: Kerr Scott Building

Pay-per-view chronology
← Previous; 2nd Anniversary	Next → You Already Know (2024)

Live chronology
← Previous; Live 3	Next → Live 5

Live 4 was a professional wrestling internet pay-per-view (iPPV) event that took place in Raleigh, North Carolina at the Kerr Scott Building on January 20, 2024, and aired on DPW On Demand on the same day. Commentary was provided by Rich Bocchini, Caprice Coleman, and Veda Scott. This was the fourth event under the Live chronology.

No.	Results	Stipulations	Times
1	Bojack defeated BK Westbrook by pinfall	Singles match	8:31
2	Titus Alexander defeated Kevin Blackwood by pinfall	Singles match	9:52
3	MxM (Mason Madden and Mansoor) defeated Miracle Generation (Dustin Waller and Kylon King) by pinfall	Tag team match	14:12
4	Colby Corino defeated Adam Priest, LaBron Kozone and Alec Price by pinfall	Four-way match to determine the #1 contender to the DPW Worlds Championship	11:16
5	The Dark Order (Evil Uno and Stu Grayson) defeated Violence Is Forever (Dominic Garrini and Kevin Ku) by pinfall	Tag team match to determine the #1 contender to the DPW Worlds Tag Team Championship	18:12
6	Miyuki Takase (c) defeated Nicole Matthews by pinfall	Singles match for the DPW Women's Worlds Championship	11:51
7	Calvin Tankman (c) defeated Andrew Everett by pinfall	Singles match for the DPW Worlds Championship	16:42
(c) / – the champion(s) heading into the match

=== You Already Know (2024) ===
You Already Know (2024)
- Promotion: Deadlock Pro-Wrestling
- Date: January 21, 2024 (aired January 28, 2024)
- City: Raleigh, North Carolina
- Venue: Kerr Scott Building

Pay-per-view chronology
← Previous; Live 4	Next → Forever (2024)

You Already Know chronology
← Previous; You Already Know (2023)	Next → You Already Know (2025)

You Already Know 2024 was a professional wrestling internet pay-per-view (iPPV) event that took place in Raleigh, North Carolina at the Kerr Scott Building on January 21, 2024. This was the third event under the You Already Know chronology. Commentary was provided by Rich Bocchini, Caprice Coleman, and Veda Scott. This show aired on DPW On Demand on January 28.

No.	Results	Stipulations	Times
1	Bojack and LaBron Kozone defeated Oliver Sawyer and BK Westbrook by pinfall	Tag team match	9:48
2	Adam Priest defeated Andrew Everett by submission	Singles match	8:29
3	Nicole Matthews defeated Rachel Armstrong by pinfall	Singles match	8:18
4	Mike Bailey and Jake Something defeated Kevin Blackwood and Alec Price by pinfall	Tag team match	17:59
5	Miyuki Takase (c) defeated Lady Frost by pinfall	Singles match for the DPW Women's Worlds Championship	10:57
6	The Motor City Machine Guns (Alex Shelley and Chris Sabin) (c) defeated The Dark Order (Evil Uno and Stu Grayson) by pinfall	Tag team match for the DPW Worlds Tag Team Championship	15:35
7	Calvin Tankman (c) defeated Colby Corino by pinfall	Steel Cage match for the DPW Worlds Championship	13:17
(c) / – the champion(s) heading into the match

=== Forever (2024) ===
Forever (2024)
- Promotion: Deadlock Pro-Wrestling
- Date: February 18, 2024 (aired February 24, 2024)
- City: Pasadena, Texas
- Venue: Campbell Hall

Pay-per-view chronology
← Previous; You Already Know (2024)	Next → Live 5

Forever chronology
← Previous; Forever (2023)	Next → —

Forever (2024) was professional wrestling internet pay-per-view (iPPV) event that took place in Pasadena, Texas at Campbell Hall on February 18, 2024. It was the third event under the Forever chronology. The show aired on DPW On Demand on February 24. It was the fourth event to take place outside of North Carolina and the first to take place in Texas. Commentary was provided by Rich Bocchini and Alex Del Rey.

No.	Results	Stipulations	Times
1	MxM (Mason Madden and Mansoor) defeated Culture Inc. (Eli Knight and Malik Bosede) by pinfall	Tag team match	10:20
2	Hyan defeated Raychell Rose by pinfall	Singles match	9:11
3	Kevin Blackwood defeated Alec Price by pinfall	Singles match	13:30
4	The Workhorsemen (Anthony Henry and JD Drake) defeated Chris Danger and Breeze by pinfall	Tag team match	14:30
5	Nicole Matthews defeated VertVixen by pinfall	Singles match	8:46
6	Calvin Tankman (c) defeated Gringo Loco and Stephen Wolf by pinfall	Three-way match for the DPW Worlds Championship	12:48
7	Bryan Keith (c) defeated Jake Something by pinfall	Singles match for the DPW National Championship	18:33
(c) / – the champion(s) heading into the match

=== Live 5 ===
Live 5
- Promotion: Deadlock Pro-Wrestling
- Date: March 10, 2024
- City: Berwyn, Illinois
- Venue: Berwyn Eagles Club

Pay-per-view chronology
← Previous; Forever (2024)	Next → No Pressure (2024)

Live chronology
← Previous; Live 4	Next → Live 6

Live 5 was a professional wrestling internet pay-per-view (iPPV) event that took place in Berwyn, Illinois at the Berwyn Eagles Club on March 10, 2024, and aired on DPW On Demand on the same day. This was the fifth event under the Live chronology and the first to take place in Illinois. Commentary was provided by Rich Bocchini, Caprice Coleman, and Veda Scott.

No.	Results	Stipulations	Times
1	Team Filthy (Tom Lawlor, Jorel Nelson and Royce Isaacs) defeated LaBron Kozone and Violence Is Forever (Dominic Garrini and Kevin Ku)	Six-man tag team match	11:07
2	Lady Frost defeated VertVixen	Singles match	9:38
3	Mustafa Ali defeated BK Westbrook	Singles match	12:00
4	Calvin Tankman (c) defeated Titus Alexander and Mason Madden	Three-way match for the DPW Worlds Championship	11:45
5	Speedball x Something (Mike Bailey and Jake Something) defeated The Motor City Machine Guns (Alex Shelley and Chris Sabin) (c)	Tag team match for the DPW Worlds Tag Team Championship	18:44
6	Bryan Keith (c) defeated Anthony Henry (with JD Drake)	Singles match for the DPW National Championship	14:20
(c) / – the champion(s) heading into the match

=== No Pressure (2024) ===
No Pressure (2024)
- Promotion: Deadlock Pro-Wrestling
- Date: April 14, 2024 (aired April 20, 2024)
- City: Durham, North Carolina
- Venue: Durham Convention Center

Pay-per-view chronology
← Previous; Live 5	Next → Limit Break

No Pressure chronology
← Previous; No Pressure (2023)	Next → No Pressure (2025)

No Pressure (2024) was a professional wrestling internet pay-per-view (iPPV) event that took place in Durham, North Carolina at the Durham Convention Center on April 14, 2024. It was the third event under the No Pressure chronology. This show aired on DPW On Demand on April 20, 2024. Commentary was provided by Rich Bocchini, Caprice Coleman, and Veda Scott.

No.	Results	Stipulations	Times
1	Jake Something defeated 1 Called Manders by pinfall	Singles match	9:15
2	VertVixen defeated Promise Braxton by pinfall	Singles match	7:49
3	Adam Priest defeated Andrew Everett by submission	Singles match	12:11
4	LaBron Kozone and Violence Is Forever (Dominic Garrini and Kevin Ku) defeated Tom Lawlor and West Coast Wrecking Crew (Jorel Nelson and Royce Isaacs) by pinfall	Captain's Fall Six-man tag team elimination match The match ends if a team captain (Labron Kozone or Tom Lawlor) is pinned or submitted. If a non-captain is pinned or submits, the match continues without the captain.	22:19
5	Bojack defeated Diego Hill, Ichiban and Myron Reed by pinfall	Four-way match	9:39
6	Queen Aminata and Emi Sakura defeated Lady Frost and Hyan by pinfall	Tag team match	15:28
7	Colby Corino defeated Masato Tanaka by pinfall	No Disqualification match	22:41
8	Calvin Tankman (c) defeated Mike Bailey by referee stoppage	Singles match for the DPW Worlds Championship; Since Tankman won, he earned a DPW Worlds Tag Team Championship match.	20:32
(c) / – the champion(s) heading into the match

=== Limit Break (2024) ===
Limit Break (2024)
- Promotion: Deadlock Pro-Wrestling
- Date: May 19, 2024 (aired May 26, 2024)
- City: Durham, North Carolina
- Venue: Durham Convention Center

Pay-per-view chronology
← Previous; No Pressure (2024)	Next → Live 6

Limit Break chronology
← Previous —	Next → Limit Break (2025)

Limit Break (2024) was a professional wrestling internet pay-per-view (iPPV) event that took place in Durham, North Carolina at the Durham Convention Center on May 19, 2024. This show aired on DPW On Demand on May 26, 2024.

No.	Results	Stipulations	Times
1^{D}	Morgan Dash defeated Chris Young by pinfall	Singles match	4:17
2	LaBron Kozone defeated Bojack by pinfall	DPW National Championship Eliminator Qualifying match	11:48
3	Miyu Yamashita and Lady Frost defeated Hyan and VertVixen by pinfall	Tag team match	13:31
4	Adam Priest defeated Kevin Blackwood by submission	DPW National Championship Eliminator Qualifying match	14:11
5	The Motor City Machine Guns (Alex Shelley and Chris Sabin) defeated MxM (Mason Madden and Mansoor) by pinfall	Tag team match	17:31
6	Roderick Strong defeated Fuminori Abe by pinfall	Singles match	17:08
7	Calvin Tankman (c) defeated Kevin Ku by pinfall	Singles match for the DPW Worlds Championship	16:49
(c) / – the champion(s) heading into the match; D / – this was a dark match

=== Live 6 ===
Live 6
- Promotion: Deadlock Pro-Wrestling
- Date: June 16, 2024
- City: Chicago, Illinois
- Venue: Logan Square Auditorium

Pay-per-view chronology
← Previous; Limit Break	Next → Live 7

Live chronology
← Previous; Live 5	Next → Live 7

Live 6 was a professional wrestling internet pay-per-view (iPPV) event that took place in Chicago, Illinois at the Logan Square Auditorium on June 16, 2024, and aired on DPW On Demand on the same day. This was the sixth event under the Live chronology and the second to take place in Illinois.

No.	Results	Stipulations	Times
1^{D}	Vaughn Vertigo defeated Grant Watts by pinfall	Singles match	—
2^{D}	Rachel Armstrong defeated Haley Dylan by pinfall	Singles match	—
3	Violence Is Forever (Dominic Garrini and Kevin Ku) defeated Ichiban and Diego Hill by pinfall	Tag team match	14:27
4	Kevin Blackwood (c) defeated Andrew Everett by pinfall	Singles match for the West Coast Pro Wrestling Heavyweight Championship	4:20
5	Adam Priest defeated LaBron Kozone by technical submission	DPW National Championship Eliminator match	14:46
6	Speedball x Something (Mike Bailey and Jake Something) (c) defeated Sinner and Saint (Travis Williams and Judas Icarus) by pinfall	Tag team match for the DPW Worlds Tag Team Championship	15:02
7	Miyuki Takase (c) defeated Dani Luna by pinfall	Singles match for the DPW Women's Worlds Championship	10:47
8	Calvin Tankman (c) defeated Alex Shelley by pinfall	Singles match for the DPW Worlds Championship	15:29
(c) / – the champion(s) heading into the match; D / – this was a dark match

=== Live 7 ===
Live 7
- Promotion: Deadlock Pro-Wrestling
- Date: July 6, 2024
- City: Raleigh, North Carolina
- Venue: Kerr Scott Building

Pay-per-view chronology
← Previous; Live 6	Next → Tag Festival (2024)

Live chronology
← Previous; Live 6	Next → —

Live 7 was a professional wrestling internet pay-per-view (iPPV) event that took place in Raleigh, North Carolina at the Kerr Scott Building on July 6, 2024, and aired on DPW On Demand on the same day. This was the seventh event under the Live chronology.

No.	Results	Stipulations	Times
1^{D}	Ryan Clancy defeated Grant Watts by pinfall	Singles match	—
2^{D}	Miracle Generation (Dustin Waller and Kylon King) defeated Manny Lo and Morgan Dash by pinfall	Tag team match	—
3	LaBron Kozone defeated Diego Hill and Ichiban by pinfall	Three-way match	9:19
4	Chris Danger defeated Breeze by pinfall	Singles match	11:52
5	Dani Luna defeated Danni Bee by pinfall	Battle of the Best First Round match	10:36
6	Kevin Blackwood and BK Westbrook defeated Adam Priest and Krule by pinfall	Raleigh Street Fight	18:36
7	Robbie Eagles defeated Alec Price by submission	Singles match	14:27
8	Shoko Nakajima defeated Masha Slamovich by pinfall	Battle of the Best First Round match	16:16
9	Speedball x Something (Mike Bailey and Jake Something) (c) defeated Calvin Tankman and Titus Alexander by pinfall	Tag team match for the DPW Worlds Tag Team Championship	17:40
(c) / – the champion(s) heading into the match; D / – this was a dark match

=== Tag Festival (2024) ===
Tag Festival (2024)
- Promotion: Deadlock Pro-Wrestling
- Date: July 7, 2024 (aired July 13, 2024)
- City: Raleigh, North Carolina
- Venue: Kerr Scott Building

Pay-per-view chronology
← Previous; Live 7	Next → Untouchable

Tag Festival chronology
← Previous; Tag Festival (2023)	Next → Tag Festival (2025)

Tag Festival (2024) was professional wrestling internet pay-per-view (iPPV) event that took place in Raleigh, North Carolina at the Kerr Scott Building on July 7, 2024. It was the second event under the Tag Festival chronology. The event featured a one night 8-team tournament. The show aired on DPW On Demand on July 13, 2024.

No.	Results	Stipulations	Times
1^{D}	Ryan Clancy defeated Manny Lo	Singles match	—
2^{D}	Ichiban defeated Grant Watts	Singles match	—
3	Miracle Generation (Kylon King and Dustin Waller) defeated Above The Rest (Gabriel Skye and Tristen Thai) by pinfall	Tag Festival First Round match	10:17
4	MxM (Mansoor and Mason Madden) defeated Judas Icarus and Alan Angels (with Travis Williams) by pinfall	Tag Festival First Round match	9:16
5	Grizzled Young Veterans (James Drake and Zack Gibson) defeated The Motor City Machine Guns (Alex Shelley and Chris Sabin) by pinfall	Tag Festival First Round match	15:14
6	Violence Is Forever (Dominic Garrini and Kevin Ku) defeated West Coast Wrecking Crew (Jorel Nelson and Royce Isaacs) by pinfall	Tag Festival First Round match	10:28
7	Hyan defeated Kylie Rae by pinfall	Battle of the Best First Round match	9:49
8	Titus Alexander defeated Mike Bailey by pinfall	Singles match	13:30
9	Adam Priest defeated BK Westbrook and Kevin Blackwood by submission	Three-way match for the vacant DPW National Championship	16:48
10	Violence Is Forever (Dominic Garrini and Kevin Ku) defeated Miracle Generation (Dustin Waller and Kylon King), MxM (Mason Madden and Mansoor), and Grizzled Young Veterans (James Drake and Zack Gibson) by pinfall	Tag Festival Tournament final Four-way tag team elimination match	17:21
D / – this was a dark match

=== Untouchable ===
Untouchable
- Promotion(s): Deadlock Pro-Wrestling; West Coast Pro Wrestling; Prestige Wrestling
- Date: July 20, 2024
- City: San Francisco, California
- Venue: United Irish Culture Center

Pay-per-view chronology
← Previous; Tag Festival (2024) (DPW); Pro For The Coast (West Coast Pro); Combat Clash PDX (Prestige)	Next → High Noon (DPW); City To City (West Coast Pro); Roseland 9 (Prestige)

Untouchable was a co-promoted professional wrestling event produced by Deadlock Pro-Wrestling, West Coast Pro Wrestling, and Prestige Wrestling that took place in San Francisco, California at the United Irish Culture Center on July 20, 2024. This event was DPW's third co-promoted show.

No.	Results	Stipulations	Times
1	Alpha Zo defeated Alex Shelley by pinfall	Singles match	11:54
2	Kevin Blackwood (c) defeated BEEF by pinfall	Singles match for the West Coast Pro Heavyweight Championship	14:42
3	Sandra Moone defeated Zara Zakher by pinfall	Singles match	10:03
4	Adam Priest (c) defeated Vinnie Massaro by submission	Singles match for the DPW National Championship	12:28
5	Calvin Tankman (c) (with Beef) defeated Jiah Jewell by pinfall	Singles match for the DPW Worlds Championship	9:33
6	Los Suavecitos (Danny Rose and Ricky Gee) (c) (with Adrian Quest) defeated Lucas Riley and Alonso Alvarez by pinfall	Tag team match for the West Coast Pro Tag Team Championship	11:36
7	Aaron Solo defeated Jasper Montoya by submission	Singles match	00:51
8	Starboy Charlie defeated Alan Angels (c) by pinfall	Singles match for the Prestige World Championship	11:15
9	Shelton Benjamin defeated Titus Alexander by pinfall	Singles match	17:24
(c) / – the champion(s) heading into the match

=== High Noon ===
High Noon
- Promotion: Deadlock Pro-Wrestling
- Date: August 18, 2024 (aired August 24, 2024)
- City: Pasadena, Texas
- Venue: Campbell Hall

Pay-per-view chronology
← Previous; Untouchable	Next → Carolina Classic

High Noon was professional wrestling internet pay-per-view (iPPV) event that took place in Pasadena, Texas at Campbell Hall on August 18, 2024. The show aired on DPW On Demand on August 24, 2024.

No.	Results	Stipulations	Times
1	Violence is Forever (Dominic Garrini and Kevin Ku) defeated CPF (Danny Black and Joe Lando) by pinfall	Tag team match	8:46
2	Trish Adora defeated Ashley Vox by pinfall	Battle of the Best First Round match	12:37
3	LaBron Kozone defeated Alec Price by pinfall	Singles match	10:42
4	Adam Priest (c) defeated Kevin Blackwood by referee stoppage	Singles match for the DPW National Championship	12:38
5	Calvin Tankman (c) defeated Trevor Lee by pinfall	Singles match for the DPW Worlds Championship	20:07
6	Speedball x Something (Mike Bailey and Jake Something) (c) vs. ABC (Ace Austin and Chris Bey) ended in a time-limit draw	Tag team match for the DPW Worlds Tag Team Championship	30:00
(c) / – the champion(s) heading into the match

=== Carolina Classic (2024) ===
Carolina Classic (2024)
- Promotion: Deadlock Pro-Wrestling
- Date: September 15, 2024 (aired September 22, 2024)
- City: Durham, North Carolina
- Venue: Durham Convention Center

Pay-per-view chronology
← Previous; High Noon	Next → Roseland 9

Carolina Classic chronology
← Previous; Carolina Classic (2023)	Next → Carolina Classic (2025)

Carolina Classic 2024 was a professional wrestling internet pay-per-view (iPPV) event that took place in Durham, North Carolina at the Durham Convention Center on September 15, 2024. Commentary was provided by Rich Bocchini, Caprice Coleman, and Veda Scott. The show aired on DPW On Demand on September 22, 2024.

No.	Results	Stipulations	Times
1	Jake Something defeated Mad Dog Connelly by pinfall	Carolina Classic First Round match	7:28
2	Luke Jacobs defeated Kevin Blackwood by pinfall	Carolina Classic First Round match	14:05
3	LaBron Kozone defeated Timothy Thatcher by pinfall	Carolina Classic First Round match	13:42
4	Mike Bailey defeated Titus Alexander by pinfall	Carolina Classic First Round match	12:43
5	Robbie Eagles (c) defeated Jackson Drake by submission	Singles match for the Soul of PWA Championship	15:15
6	Dani Luna defeated Hyan by pinfall	Battle of the Best Semifinal match	13:02
7	Shoko Nakajima defeated Jada Stone by pinfall	Battle of the Best Semifinal match	11:21
8	Jake Something defeated LaBron Kozone, Luke Jacobs and Mike Bailey	Carolina Classic Tournament final Four-way elimination match	24:03
(c) / – the champion(s) heading into the match

=== Roseland 9 ===
Roseland 9
- Promotion(s): Deadlock Pro-Wrestling; West Coast Pro Wrestling; Prestige Wrestling
- Date: September 29, 2024
- City: Portland, Oregon
- Venue: Roseland Theater

Pay-per-view chronology
← Previous; Carolina Classic (DPW); Bring The Pain (West Coast Pro); Untouchable (Prestige)	Next → Super Battle (DPW); For The Homies By The Homies (West Coast Pro); Always The Hard Way (Prestige)

Roseland 9 was a co-promoted professional wrestling event produced by Deadlock Pro-Wrestling, West Coast Pro Wrestling, and Prestige Wrestling that took place in Portland, Oregon at the United Roseland Theater on September 29, 2024. This event was DPW's fourth co-promoted show.

No.	Results	Stipulations	Times
1	Sinner and Saint (Judas Icarus and Travis Williams) (c) defeated Violence Is Forever (Dominic Garrini and Kevin Ku) and C4 (Cody Chhun and Guillermo Rosas) by pinfall	Three-way tag team match for the Prestige Tag Team Championship	12:52
2	Adam Priest (c) defeated Ethan HD by submission	Singles match for the DPW National Championship	8:16
3	Masha Slamovich defeated Kylie Rae by pinfall	Singles match	12:58
4	Jaiden defeated Alpha Zo and Matt Branagan by pinfall	Three-way match	13:52
5	Athena defeated Amira by pinfall	Singles match	12:42
6	Kevin Blackwood (c) defeated Trevor Lee by pinfall	Singles match for the West Coast Pro Heavyweight Championship	21:10
7	Midnight Heat (Eddie Pearl and Ricky Gibson) defeated SoCal Uncensored (Frankie Kazarian and Scorpio Sky)	Tag team match	14:49
8	Calvin Tankman (c) defeated Donovan Dijak by pinfall	Singles match for the DPW Worlds Championship	15:56
9	Mustafa Ali defeated Alan Angels (c) (with Travis Williams and Judas Icarus) by disqualification	Singles match for the Prestige World Championship	19:27
(c) / – the champion(s) heading into the match

=== Super Battle ===
Super Battle
- Promotion: Deadlock Pro-Wrestling
- Date: October 13, 2024 (aired October 19, 2024)
- City: Charlotte, North Carolina
- Venue: Grady Cole Center

Pay-per-view chronology
← Previous; Roseland 9	Next → World's Strongest

Super Battle was a professional wrestling internet pay-per-view (iPPV) event that took place in Charlotte, North Carolina at the Grady Cole Center on October 13, 2024. The show aired on DPW On Demand on October 19, 2024.

No.	Results	Stipulations	Times
1	1 Called Manders, BK Westbrook and Thomas Shire defeated Leon Slater and Lykos Gym (Kid Lykos and Kid Lykos II) by pinfall	Six-man tag team match	12:09
2	Danni Bee and Hyan defeated Alex Windsor and Emi Sakura by pinfall	Tag team match	14:05
3	Kenta defeated Kevin Blackwood by pinfall	Singles match	14:28
4	LaBron Kozone defeated Mike Bailey by pinfall	Singles match to determe a #1 contender for the DPW National Championship	12:43
5	Dani Luna defeated Shoko Nakajima by pinfall	Battle of the Best Tournament final	13:17
6	Adam Priest (c) defeated Masato Tanaka by pinfall	Singles match for the DPW National Championship	13:53
7	FTR (Cash Wheeler and Dax Harwood) vs. Violence Is Forever (Dominic Garrini and Kevin Ku) ended in a time-limit draw	Tag team match	20:00
8	Jake Something defeated Calvin Tankman (c) by pinfall	Singles match for the DPW Worlds Championship	22:49
(c) / – the champion(s) heading into the match

=== World's Strongest (2024) ===
World's Strongest (2024)
- Promotion: Deadlock Pro-Wrestling
- Date: November 17, 2024 (aired November 24, 2024)
- City: Jersey City, New Jersey
- Venue: White Eagle Hall

Pay-per-view chronology
← Previous; Super Battle	Next → 3rd Anniversary

World's Strongest chronology
← Previous; World's Strongest (2023)	Next → —

World's Strongest 2024 was a professional wrestling internet pay-per-view (iPPV) event that took place in Jersey City, New Jersey at the White Eagle Hall on November 17, 2024. The show was aired on DPW On Demand on November 24, 2024.

No.	Results	Stipulations	Times
1^{D}	Juni Underwood defeated TJ Crawford	Singles match	—
2	Andrew Everett and BK Westbrook defeated 1 Called Manders and Thomas Shire by pinfall	Tag team match	13:51
3	LaBron Kozone defeated Jackson Drake by pinfall	Singles match	11:04
4	Dani Luna defeated Danni Bee by pinfall	Singles match	8:15
5	The Beast Mortos defeated Rey Horus and Arez by pinfall	Three-way match	10:34
6	Kushida defeated Adam Priest (c) by disqualification	Singles match for the DPW National Championship	12:05
7	Mike Bailey defeated Titus Alexander 2–1	Two out of three falls match	20:34
8	Jake Something (c) defeated Donovan Dijak by pinfall	Singles match for the DPW Worlds Championship	17:51
(c) / – the champion(s) heading into the match; D / – this was a dark match

=== 3rd Anniversary ===
3rd Anniversary
- Promotion: Deadlock Pro-Wrestling
- Date: December 8, 2024 (aired December 15, 2024)
- City: Durham, North Carolina
- Venue: Durham Convention Center

Pay-per-view chronology
← Previous; World's Strongest	Next → You Already Know

Anniversary chronology
← Previous; 2nd Anniversary	Next → —

3rd Anniversary was a professional wrestling internet pay-per-view (iPPV) event that took place in Durham, North Carolina at the Durham Convention Center on December 8, 2024. The show was aired on DPW On Demand on December 15, 2024.

No.	Results	Stipulations	Times
1	BK Westbrook defeated Jackson Drake by pinfall	Singles match	10:56
2	Kevin Blackwood defeated Mad Dog Connelly by pinfall	Singles match	8:20
3	Hyan defeated Emi Sakura by pinfall	Singles match	9:29
4	Luke Jacobs defeated 1 Called Manders by pinfall	Singles match	12:11
5	Trevor Lee defeated Andrew Everett by pinfall	Singles match	16:41
6	Violence Is Forever (Dominic Garrini and Kevin Ku) defeated Speedball x Something (Mike Bailey and Jake Something) (c) by pinfall	Tag team match for the DPW Worlds Tag Team Championship	24:07
7	LaBron Kozone defeated Adam Priest (c) by pinfall	Singles match for the DPW National Championship	18:38
(c) / – the champion(s) heading into the match

=== You Already Know (2025) ===
You Already Know (2025)
- Promotion: Deadlock Pro-Wrestling
- Date: January 17, 2025 (aired January 21, 2025)
- City: Ridgefield Park, New Jersey
- Venue: The Mecca

Pay-per-view chronology
← Previous; 3rd Anniversary	Next → Title Fight in Texas

You Already Know chronology
← Previous; You Already Know (2024)	Next → —

You Already Know (2025) was a professional wrestling internet pay-per-view (iPPV) event that took place in Ridgefield Park, New Jersey at The Mecca on January 17, 2025. The show was aired on DPW On Demand on January 21, 2025.

No.	Results	Stipulations	Times
1^{D}	Juni Underwood defeated Landon Hale	Singles match	—
2^{D}	Love Doug defeated Channing Thomas	Singles match	—
3	Miracle Generation (Dustin Waller and Kylon King) defeated Ichiban and Diego Hill by pinfall	Tag team match	9:38
4	Queen Aminata defeated Kylie Rae by pinfall	Singles match	11:22
5	Adam Priest defeated 1 Called Manders by submission	DPW National Championship Eliminator qualifying match	11:38
6	Kevin Blackwood defeated Titus Alexander by pinfall	DPW National Championship Eliminator qualifying match	15:39
7	Trevor Lee and Calvin Tankman defeated Andrew Everett and BK Westbrook by pinfall	Tag team match	19:32
8	LaBron Kozone (c) defeated Starboy Charlie by pinfall	Singles match for the DPW National Championship	15:41
9	Jake Something (c) defeated Ace Austin by pinfall	Singles match for the DPW Worlds Championship	19:45
(c) / – the champion(s) heading into the match; D / – this was a dark match

=== Title Fight in Texas ===
Title Fight in Texas
- Promotion: Deadlock Pro-Wrestling
- Date: January 26, 2025 (aired February 2, 2025)
- City: Pasadena, Texas
- Venue: Campbell Hall

Pay-per-view chronology
← Previous; You Already Know (2025)	Next → No Pressure (2025)

Title Fight chronology
← Previous; First	Next → Title Fight in Vegas

Title Fight in Texas was a professional wrestling internet pay-per-view (iPPV) event that took place in Pasadena, Texas at the Campbell Hall on January 26, 2025. The show was aired on DPW On Demand on February 2, 2025.

No.	Results	Stipulations	Times
1	Calvin Tankman defeated Danny Orion by pinfall	Singles match	7:43
2	Grizzled Young Veterans (James Drake and Zack Gibson) defeated Arez and Látigo by pinfall	Tag team match	13:16
3	LaBron Kozone defeated Titus Alexander by pinfall	Proving Ground match Since Alexander did not lasts 10 minutes, he did not earn an opportunity to challenge for Kozone's DPW National Championship.	9:59
4	Kevin Blackwood defeated Adam Priest by pinfall	DPW National Championship Eliminator match	14:24
5	Violence Is Forever (Dominic Garrini and Kevin Ku) (c) defeated Intergalactic Jet Setters (Kevin Knight and Kushida) by pinfall	Tag team match for the DPW Worlds Tag Team Championship	15:26
6	Dani Luna defeated Miyuki Takase (c) by pinfall	Singles match for the DPW Women's Worlds Championship	14:51
(c) / – the champion(s) heading into the match

=== No Pressure (2025) ===
No Pressure (2025)
- Promotion: Deadlock Pro-Wrestling
- Date: February 16, 2025 (aired February 23, 2025)
- City: Chicago, Illinois
- Venue: Logan Square Auditorium

Pay-per-view chronology
← Previous; Title Fight in Texas	Next → Forever (2025)

No Pressure chronology
← Previous; No Pressure (2024)	Next → —

No Pressure (2025) was a professional wrestling internet pay-per-view (iPPV) event that took place in Chicago, Illinois at the Logan Square Auditorium on February 16, 2025. The show was aired on DPW On Demand on February 23, 2025.

No.	Results	Stipulations	Times
1	Titus Alexander defeated Juni Underwood by pinfall	Singles match	7:37
2	Miracle Generation (Dustin Waller and Kylon King) defeated Sinner and Saint (Travis Williams and Judas Icarus) by pinfall	Tag team match	10:11
3	Adam Priest defeated Colby Corino and Trevor Lee by pinfall	Three-way match	15:34
4	Grizzled Young Veterans (James Drake and Zack Gibson) defeated Violence Is Forever (Dominic Garrini and Kevin Ku) (c) by pinfall	Tag team match for the DPW Worlds Tag Team Championship	21:10
5	LaBron Kozone (c) defeated Kevin Blackwood by pinfall	Singles match for the DPW National Championship	17:06
6	Dani Luna (c) defeated Hyan by pinfall	Chicago Street Fight for the DPW Women's Worlds Championship	21:57
(c) / – the champion(s) heading into the match

=== Forever (2025) ===
Forever (2025)
- Promotion: Deadlock Pro-Wrestling
- Date: March 16, 2025 (aired March 23, 2025)
- City: Durham, North Carolina
- Venue: Durham Armory

Pay-per-view chronology
← Previous; No Pressure (2025)	Next → Title Fight in Vegas

Forever chronology
← Previous; Forever (2024)	Next → —

Forever (2025) was a professional wrestling internet pay-per-view (iPPV) event that took place in Durham, North Carolina at the Durham Armory on March 16, 2025. The show was aired on DPW On Demand on March 23, 2025.

No.	Results	Stipulations	Times
1	Leon Slater defeated Manny Lo and Jackson Drake by pinfall	Three-way match	10:28
2	Grizzled Young Veterans (James Drake and Zack Gibson) defeated Andrew Everett and BK Westbrook by pinfall	Proving Ground Tag team match Since Everett and Westbrook did not lasts 15 minutes, they did not earn an opportunity to challenge for Grizzled Young Veterans' DPW Worlds Tag Team Championship.	12:35
3	Kenta defeated Titus Alexander by pinfall	Singles match	11:56
4	Colby Corino and Masato Tanaka defeated Calvin Tankman and Trevor Lee by pinfall	Tag team match	12:44
5	LaBron Kozone (c) defeated Kevin Blackwood by pinfall	Singles match for the DPW National Championship	15:33
6	Dani Luna (c) defeated Hyan by technical submission	Dog Collar match for the DPW Women's Worlds Championship	16:40
(c) / – the champion(s) heading into the match

=== Title Fight in Vegas ===
Title Fight in Vegas
- Promotion: Deadlock Pro-Wrestling
- Date: April 18, 2025 (aired April 23, 2025)
- City: Las Vegas, Nevada
- Venue: MEET Las Vegas

Pay-per-view chronology
← Previous; Forever (2025)	Next → Spirit Rising

Title Fight chronology
← Previous; Title Fight in Texas	Next → —

Title Fight in Vegas was a professional wrestling internet pay-per-view (iPPV) event that took place in Las Vegas, Nevada at MEET Las Vegas on April 18, 2025. This event was a part of "Las Vegas Mania" run by Prestige Wrestling, West Coast Pro Wrestling and Deadlock Pro-Wrestling. The show was aired on April 23, 2025, on DPW On Demand.

No.	Results	Stipulations	Times
1	Masha Slamovich and Queen Aminata defeated Magenta (Maria and Riko Kawahata) by pinfall	Tag team match	12:54
2	Arez and The Beast Mortos defeated Laredo Kid and Rey Horus by pinfall	Tag team match	9:58
3	Takumi Iroha defeated Dani Luna by pinfall	Proving Ground match Since Iroha won the match, she earned an opportunity to challenge for Luna's DPW Women's Worlds Championship.	9:38
4	LaBron Kozone (c) defeated Leon Slater by pinfall	Singles match for the DPW National Championship	14:49
5	Grizzled Young Veterans (James Drake and Zack Gibson) (c) defeated Violence Is Forever (Dominic Garrini and Kevin Ku) by pinfall	Sin City Street Fight for the DPW Worlds Tag Team Championship	18:44
6	Adam Priest won by last eliminating Calvin Tankman (Note: Other competitors in order of elimination: Titus Alexander, Michael Oku, Thomas Shire, Mad Dog Connelly, Matt Tremont, Bryan Keith, Luke Jacobs, Kevin Blackwood, BK Westbrook, and Trevor Lee.)	Ultimate Conflict match for the vacant DPW Worlds Championship	32:29
(c) / – the champion(s) heading into the match

=== Spirit Rising ===
Spirit Rising
- Promotion: Deadlock Pro-Wrestling
- Date: April 24–25, 2025 (aired May 10–11, 2025)
- City: Tokyo, Japan
- Venue: Shinjuku Face (April 24); Shin-Kiba 1st Ring (April 25)

Pay-per-view chronology
← Previous; Title Fight in Vegas	Next → Limit Break (2025)

Spirit Rising was a two-day professional wrestling internet pay-per-view (iPPV) event that took place in Tokyo, Japan at Shinjuku Face on April 24, 2025, and at Shin-Kiba 1st Ring on April 25, 2025. The show aired on DPW On Demand on May 10 and 11, 2025.

Day 1
No.	Results	Stipulations	Times
1	Miyuki Takase defeated Miku Kanae by pinfall	Singles match	10:17
2	Emi Sakura and BestBros (Mei Suruga and Baliyan Akki) defeated Miya Yotsuba, Chie Koishikawa, and Hagane Shinno by pinfall	Six-person tag team match	12:27
3	Chris Brookes and Harashima vs. LaBron Kozone and Calvin Tankman ended in a time-limit draw	Tag team match	20:00
4	Astronauts (Fuminori Abe and Takuya Nomura) defeated Violence Is Forever (Dominic Garrini and Kevin Ku) by submission	Tag team match	16:28
5	Adam Priest (c) defeated Shigehiro Irie by submission	Singles match for the DPW Worlds Championship	12:08
6	Dani Luna (c) defeated Rika Tatsumi by pinfall	Singles match for the DPW Women's Worlds Championship	11:56
(c) / – the champion(s) heading into the match

Day 2
No.	Results	Stipulations	Times
1	BestBros (Mei Suruga and Baliyan Akki), Emi Sakura, and Chris Brookes defeated Violence Is Forever (Dominic Garrini and Kevin Ku), Miyuki Takase, and Ryo Mizunami by pinfall	Eight-person tag team match	14:02
2	Calvin Tankman and Kazuma Sumi defeated Kazusada Higuchi and Yuki Ishida by pinfall	Tag team match	9:41
3	Adam Priest defeated Fuminori Abe by pinfall	Singles match for the DPW Worlds Championship	13:41
4	Dani Luna (c) defeated Rina Yamashita by pinfall	Singles match for the DPW Women's Worlds Championship	11:23
5	LaBron Kozone (c) defeated Takuya Nomura by pinfall	Singles match for the DPW National Championship	14:52
(c) / – the champion(s) heading into the match

=== Limit Break (2025) ===
Limit Break (2025)
- Promotion: Deadlock Pro-Wrestling
- Date: May 18, 2025 (aired May 25, 2025)
- City: Durham, North Carolina
- Venue: Durham Armory

Pay-per-view chronology
← Previous; Spirit Rising	Next → Unit3d

Limit Break (2025) was a professional wrestling internet pay-per-view (iPPV) event that took place in Durham, North Carolina at Durham Armory on May 18, 2025. The show aired on DPW On Demand on May 25, 2025.

No.	Results	Stipulations	Times
1	Bojack defeated Morgan Dash and Manny Lo by pinfall	Three-way match	8:58
2	Hyan defeated Maya World by pinfall	Singles match	9:15
3	BK Westbrook defeated Kevin Blackwood by pinfall	DPW National Championship Eliminator qualifying match	10:52
4	Mad Dog Connelly defeated Thomas Shire by technical submission	Relaxed Rules match	8:43
5	Grizzled Young Veterans (James Drake and Zack Gibson) (c) defeated Miracle Generation (Dustin Waller and Kylon King) by pinfall	Tag team match for the DPW Worlds Tag Team Championship	15:16
6	Cedric Alexander defeated Andrew Everett by pinfall	DPW National Championship Eliminator qualifying match	12:16
7	Trevor Lee and Adam Priest (Worlds) defeated LaBron Kozone (National) and Colby Corino	Golden Ticket tag team match Since Lee pinned Corino, he earned a title match against Kozone.	19:23
(c) / – the champion(s) heading into the match

=== Unit3d ===
Unit3d
- Promotion(s): Deadlock Pro-Wrestling; West Coast Pro Wrestling; Prestige Wrestling
- Date: June 1, 2025
- City: Los Angeles, California
- Venue: Vermont Hollywood

Pay-per-view chronology
← Previous; Limit Break (2025)	Next → Victory Lap (2025)

Unit3d was a co-promoted professional wrestling event produced by Deadlock Pro-Wrestling, West Coast Pro Wrestling, and Prestige Wrestling that took place in Los Angeles, California at Vermont Hollywood on June 1, 2025. This event was DPW's fifth co-promoted show.

No.	Results	Stipulations	Times
1	Andrew Cass and Jiah Jewell defeated Jason Xavier and JT Thorne by pinfall	Tag team match	6:36
2	Jordan Cruz defeated Starboy Charlie by pinfall	Singles match	6:27
3	Kevin Blackwood (c) defeated Shane Haste by pinfall	Singles match for the West Coast Pro Heavyweight Championship	12:37
4	Dani Luna (c) defeated Nicole Matthews by pinfall	Singles match for the DPW Women's Worlds Championship	13:04
5	Jake Something and Matt Tremont defeated Adam Priest and Mad Dog Connelly by pinfall	Tag team match	12:13
6	Alan Angels (c) (with Jordan Cruz) defeated Jordan Oliver by pinfall	Singles match for the Prestige World Championship	13:53
7	Cedric Alexander defeated Trevor Lee by pinfall	Singles match	17:21
8	Cowboy Way (1 Called Manders and Thomas Shire) (c) defeated Sinner and Saint (Judas Icarus and Travis Williams) by pinfall	Tag team match for the West Coast Pro Tag Team Championship	23:52
(c) / – the champion(s) heading into the match

=== Victory Lap (2025) ===
Victory Lap (2025)
- Promotion: Deadlock Pro-Wrestling
- Date: June 15, 2025 (aired June 22, 2025)
- City: Durham, North Carolina
- Venue: Durham Armory

Pay-per-view chronology
← Previous; Unit3d	Next → Tag Festival (2025)

Victory Lap chronology
← Previous; Victory Lap (2022)	Next → —

Victory Lap (2025) was a professional wrestling internet pay-per-view (iPPV) event that took place in Durham, North Carolina at Durham Armory on June 15, 2025. The show aired on DPW On Demand on June 22, 2025.

No.	Results	Stipulations	Times
1	Morgan Dash and Bojack defeated Jackson Drake and Manny Lo by pinfall	Tag team match	8:36
2	Cedric Alexander defeated BK Westbrook by pinfall	DPW National Championship Eliminator match	12:12
3	Jake Something and Colby Corino defeated Kevin Blackwood and Thomas Shire by pinfall	Tag team match	15:23
4	Mad Dog Connelly defeated Matt Tremont by technical submission	Durham Street Fight	13:51
5	Nicole Matthews defeated Dani Luna (c) by technical submission	Last Chance match for the DPW Women's Worlds Championship	13:58
6	LaBron Kozone (c) defeated Trevor Lee by pinfall	Singles match for the DPW National Championship	16:45
7	Adam Priest (c) defeated Calvin Tankman by submission	Singles match for the DPW Worlds Championship	18:47
(c) / – the champion(s) heading into the match

=== Tag Festival (2025) ===
Tag Festival (2025)
- Promotion: Deadlock Pro-Wrestling
- Date: July 13, 2025 (aired July 20, 2025)
- City: Durham, North Carolina
- Venue: Durham Convention Center

Pay-per-view chronology
← Previous; Victory Lap (2025)	Next → Cruel Summer

Tag Festival chronology
← Previous; Tag Festival (2024)	Next → —

Tag Festival (2025) was a professional wrestling internet pay-per-view (iPPV) event that took place in Durham, North Carolina at the Durham Convention Center on July 13, 2025. The show aired on DPW On Demand on July 20, 2025.

No.	Results	Stipulations	Times
1	Grizzled Young Veterans (James Drake and Zack Gibson) (c) defeated Davey Bang and August Matthews by pinfall	Tag Festival first round match for the DPW Worlds Tag Team Championship	11:20
2	Miracle Generation (Dustin Waller and Kylon King) defeated Violence Is Forever (Dominic Garrini and Kevin Ku) by pinfall	Tag Festival first round match	13:12
3	The Beast Mortos and Jake Something defeated Trevor Lee and Adam Priest by pinfall	Tag Festival first round match	10:55
4	The Workhorsemen (JD Drake and Anthony Henry) defeated Cowboy Way (1 Called Manders and Thomas Shire) by pinfall	Tag Festival first round match	10:43
5	Queen Aminata defeated Jada Stone by pinfall	Battle of the Best first round match	7:57
6	LaBron Kozone (c) defeated Cedric Alexander by pinfall	Singles match for the DPW National Championship	18:27
7	Miracle Generation (Dustin Waller and Kylon King) defeated Grizzled Young Veterans (James Drake and Zack Gibson) (c), The Beast Mortos and Jake Something, and The Workhorsemen (JD Drake and Anthony Henry)	Tag Festival tournament final Four-way tag team elimination match for the DPW Worlds Tag Team Championship	20:51
(c) / – the champion(s) heading into the match

=== Cruel Summer ===
Cruel Summer
- Promotion(s): Deadlock Pro-Wrestling; West Coast Pro Wrestling
- Date: July 26, 2025
- City: San Francisco, California
- Venue: United Irish Cultural Center

Pay-per-view chronology
← Previous; Tag Festival (2025)	Next → Showdown in Cary

Cruel Summer was a co-promoted professional wrestling event produced by Deadlock Pro-Wrestling, West Coast Pro Wrestling, and Prestige Wrestling that took place in San Francisco, California at United Irish Cultural Center on July 16, 2025. This event was DPW's sixth co-promoted show.

No.	Results	Stipulations	Times
1	Alpha Zo defeated Adrian Quest, Danny Orion, Jordan Cruz, Manny Lo and Ryan Clancy by pinfall	Golden Gate Gauntlet match for the vacant West Coast Pro Golden Gate Championship	28:33
2	LaBron Kozone (c) defeated Travis Williams by pinfall	Singles match for the DPW National Championship	9:57
3	Dani Luna and Johnnie Robbie defeated Masha Slamovich and Nicole Matthews by pinfall	Tag team match	10:44
4	Mad Dog Connelly defeated Vinnie Massaro by pinfall	No Disqualification match	10:57
5	Leon Slater defeated Judas Icarus (c) by disqualification	Singles match for the Prestige World Championship	13:14
6	The Crush Boys (Starboy Charlie and Titus Alexander) defeated Cowboy Way (1 Called Manders and Thomas Shire) (c) by pinfall	Tag team match for the West Coast Pro Tag Team Championship	14:54
7	Kevin Blackwood (c) defeated Cedric Alexander 2–1	Two out of three falls match for the West Coast Pro Heavyweight Championship	24:50
(c) / – the champion(s) heading into the match

=== Showdown in Cary ===
Showdown in Cary
- Promotion: Deadlock Pro-Wrestling
- Date: August 8, 2025 (aired August 17, 2025)
- City: Cary, North Carolina
- Venue: SportHQ

Pay-per-view chronology
← Previous; Cruel Summer	Next → Beast Coast

Showdown in Cary was professional wrestling internet pay-per-view (iPPV) event that took place in Cary, North Carolina at the SportHQ on August 8, 2025. The show aired on DPW On Demand on August 17, 2025.

No.	Results	Stipulations	Times
1	BK Westbrook defeated Andrew Everett, Morgan Dash and Bojack by pinfall	DPW National Championship Eliminator qualifying match	9:15
2	Jake Something defeated Kody Lane by pinfall	Singles match	7:00
3	Dani Luna defeated Lena Kross by pinfall	Battle of the Best first round match	15:05
4	LaBron Kozone, Calvin Tankman and Manny Lo defeated Erick Stevens and Violence is Forever (Dominic Garrini and Kevin Ku) by pinfall	Six-man tag team match	18:06
5	Nicole Matthews (c) defeated Trish Adora by pinfall	Singles match for the DPW Women's Worlds Championship	14:40
6	Miracle Generation (Dustin Waller and Kylon King) (c) defeated MxM Collection (Mansoor and Mason Madden) by pinfall	Tag team match for the DPW Worlds Tag Team Championship	17:29
7	Adam Priest (c) defeated Anthony Henry (with JD Drake) by pinfall	Singles match for the DPW Worlds Championship	15:28
(c) / – the champion(s) heading into the match

=== Beast Coast (2025) ===
Beast Coast (2025)
- Promotion: Deadlock Pro-Wrestling
- Date: August 10, 2025 (aired August 23, 2025)
- City: Jersey City, New Jersey
- Venue: White Eagle Hall

Pay-per-view chronology
← Previous; Showdown in Cary	Next → Carolina Classic (2025)

Beast Coast chronology
← Previous; Beast Coast (2023)	Next → —

Beast Coast (2025) was a professional wrestling internet pay-per-view (iPPV) event that took place in Jersey City, New Jersey at the White Eagle Hall on August 10, 2025. The show aired on DPW On Demand on August 23, 2025.

No.	Results	Stipulations	Times
1	Trevor Lee defeated Ryan Clancy by pinfall	Singles match	8:52
2	Yuu defeated Hyan by pinfall	Battle of the Best first round match	10:56
3	Mei Suruga defeated Emi Sakura by pinfall	Battle of the Best first round match	12:59
4	Mad Dog Connelly defeated Dominic Garrini by submission	Jersey City Street Fight	12:55
5	Cedric Alexander and The Workhorsemen (JD Drake and Anthony Henry) defeated Calvin Tankman, LaBron Kozone and Manny Lo by pinfall	Six-man tag team match	15:56
6	Nicole Matthews (c) defeated Masha Slamovich by pinfall	Singles match for the DPW Women's Worlds Championship	12:19
7	Miracle Generation (Dustin Waller and Kylon King) (c) defeated Grizzled Young Veterans (James Drake and Zack Gibson) by pinfall	Tag team match for the DPW Worlds Tag Team Championship	17:21
8	Adam Priest (c) (with Trevor Lee) defeated Jake Something by referee stoppage	Singles match for the DPW Worlds Championship	16:39
(c) / – the champion(s) heading into the match

=== Carolina Classic (2025) ===
Carolina Classic (2025)
- Promotion: Deadlock Pro-Wrestling
- Date: September 14, 2025 (aired September 21, 2025)
- City: Durham, North Carolina
- Venue: Durham Armory

Pay-per-view chronology
← Previous; Beast Coast (2025)	Next → Super Battle (2025)

Carolina Classic chronology
← Previous; Carolina Classic (2024)	Next → —

Carolina Classic 2025 was professional wrestling internet pay-per-view (iPPV) event that took place in Durham, North Carolina at the Durham Armory on September 14, 2025. The show aired on DPW On Demand on September 21, 2025.

No.	Results	Stipulations	Times
1	LaBron Kozone (with Manny Lo) defeated Erick Stevens by pinfall	Carolina Classic first round match	9:47
2	Jake Something defeated JD Drake by pinfall	Carolina Classic first round match	11:49
3	Trevor Lee defeated Anthony Henry by pinfall	Carolina Classic first round match	11:28
4	Calvin Tankman defeated Cedric Alexander by pinfall	Carolina Classic first round match	12:46
5	Manny Lo and Adam Priest defeated Bojack and Morgan Dash by pinfall	Tag team match	7:55
6	Queen Aminata defeated Mei Suruga and Yuu	Battle of the Best tournament final	14:30
7	Jake Something defeated Calvin Tankman, LaBron Kozone and Trevor Lee	Carolina Classic tournament final four-way elimination match	16:38

=== Super Battle (2025) ===
Carolina Classic (2025)
- Promotion: Deadlock Pro-Wrestling
- Date: October 19, 2025 (aired October 26, 2025)
- City: Charlotte, North Carolina
- Venue: Grady Cole Center

Pay-per-view chronology
← Previous; Carolina Classic (2025)	Next → Showdown in Cary II

Super Battle chronology
← Previous; 2024	Next → —

Super Battle 2025 was professional wrestling internet pay-per-view (iPPV) event that took place in Charlotte, North Carolina at the Grady Cole Center on October 19, 2025. The show aired on DPW On Demand on October 26, 2025.

No.	Results	Stipulations	Times
1	Bojack, BK Westbrook and Morgan Dash defeated Trevor Lee and Sinner & Saint (Travis Williams and Judas Icarus) by pinfall	Six-man tag team match	15:32
2	Dani Luna and Emersyn Jayne defeated Hyan and Lena Kross by pinfall	Tag team match	11:53
3	Leon Slater defeated Manny Lo by pinfall	Singles match	12:07
4	Queen Aminata defeated Nicole Matthews (c) by pinfall	Singles match for the DPW Women's Worlds Championship	16:44
5	LaBron Kozone (c) defeated Calvin Tankman by pinfall	Singles match for the DPW National Championship	12:24
6	Roderick Strong defeated Erick Stevens by pinfall	Singles match	15:24
7	Miracle Generation (Dustin Waller and Kylon King) (c) defeated Violence is Forever (Dominic Garrini and Kevin Ku) and Grizzled Young Veterans (James Drake and Zack Gibson)	Three-way ladder match for the DPW Worlds Tag Team Championship	19:23
8	Jake Something defeated Adam Priest (c) by pinfall	Steel Cage match for the DPW Worlds Championship	16:32
(c) / – the champion(s) heading into the match

=== Showdown in Cary II ===
Showdown in Cary II
- Promotion: Deadlock Pro-Wrestling
- Date: November 7, 2025 (aired November 16, 2025)
- City: Cary, North Carolina
- Venue: SportHQ

Pay-per-view chronology
← Previous; Super Battle (2025)	Next → 4th Anniversary

Showdown in Cary chronology
← Previous; Showdown in Cary I	Next → —

Showdown in Cary II was professional wrestling internet pay-per-view (iPPV) event that took place in Cary, North Carolina at the SportHQ on November 7, 2025. The show aired on DPW On Demand on November 16, 2025.

No.	Results	Stipulations	Times
1	Calvin Tankman defeated Manny Lo by pinfall	Singles match	7:52
2	Leah Night defeated Amanda Kiss by pinfall	Singles match	6:26
3	Dani Luna defeated Jada Stone by pinfall	Singles match	9:10
4	Adam Priest defeated Anthony Henry by pinfall	Singles match	10:58
5	Trevor Lee defeated BK Westbrook by pinfall	Singles match to determine the #1 contender to the DPW National Championship	15:05
6	Erick Stevens defeated Bryan Keith by pinfall	Singles match	14:11
7	Bo-Dash (Bojack and Morgan Dash) defeated Miracle Generation (Dustin Waller and Kylon King) (c) by pinfall	Tag team match for the DPW Worlds Tag Team Championship	14:11
8	LaBron Kozone (National) defeated Jake Something (Worlds) by pinfall	Champion vs. Champion match Since Kozone won, he earned a DPW Worlds Championship match at DPW 4th Anniversary	13:16
(c) / – the champion(s) heading into the match

=== 4th Anniversary ===
4th Anniversary
- Promotion: Deadlock Pro-Wrestling
- Date: December 12, 2025 (aired December 21, 2025)
- City: Cary, North Carolina
- Venue: SportHQ

Pay-per-view chronology
← Previous; Showdown in Cary II	Next → —

Anniversary chronology
← Previous; 3rd Anniversary	Next → —

DPW 4th Anniversary was professional wrestling internet pay-per-view (iPPV) event that took place in Cary, North Carolina at the SportHQ on December 12, 2025. The show aired on DPW On Demand on December 21, 2025. It was the final event held by DPW in the United States.

No.	Results	Stipulations	Times
1	Kevin Blackwood defeated Baliyan Akki by pinfall	Singles match	9:43
2	Bryan Keith defeated Manny Lo by pinfall	Singles match	10:38
3	Calvin Tankman defeated Kevin Ku by pinfall	Singles match	14:03
4	Andrew Everett and BK Westbrook defeated Trevor Lee and Adam Priest by pinfall	Street Fight	18:57
5	Miracle Generation (Dustin Waller and Kylon King) defeated Bo-Dash (Bojack and Morgan Dash) (c) by pinfall	Tag team match for the DPW Worlds Tag Team Championship	10:28
6	Mei Suruga (with Baliyan Akki) defeated Lena Kross by pinfall	Singles match for the vacant DPW Women's Worlds Championship	18:44
7	Erick Stevens defeated Mad Dog Connelly by pinfall	Dog Collar match	14:20
8	LaBron Kozone (National) defeated Jake Something (Worlds) by pinfall	Winner Takes All match for the DPW Worlds Championship and DPW National Championship	18:25
9	LaBron Kozone (c) defeated Trevor Lee (with Adam Priest) by pinfall	Singles match for the DPW National Championship	0:08
(c) / – the champion(s) heading into the match
