= DPW Fire =

American professional wrestling television program

- DPW Fire logo
- Genre: Professional wrestling
- Created by: Anthony Douglas; James Darnell; John Blud
- Presented by: James Darnell (play-by-play commentator); Anthony Douglas (color commentator); John Blud (color commentator)
- Country of origin: United States
- Original language: English
- No. of seasons: 3
- No. of episodes: 11

Production
- Camera setup: Multicamera setup
- Running time: 36-85 minutes
- Production company: Deadlock Pro-Wrestling

Original release
- Network: YouTube; DPW on Demand
- Release: December 16, 2021 – June 3, 2022

DPW Fire was a professional wrestling streaming television program produced by Deadlock Pro-Wrestling (DPW) that premiered on December 16, 2021, on YouTube. It was considered DPW's flagship program and is one of the company's two programs, along with its second main program, Spark. Due to the series not being financial enough to continue, Fire concluded with its final episode on June 3, 2022. Though, the company would still stick to its format of monthly major events.

All episodes are available for free on both YouTube and the company's streaming service DPW On Demand.

== Series overview ==
Season	Episodes	Originally released	
Season	Episodes	First released	Last released
1	4	December 16, 2021	January 6, 2022
2	4	March 17, 2022	April 8, 2022
3	3	May 20, 2022	June 3, 2022

== List of DPW Fire episodes ==
Each season of Fire focuses on storylines leading into the DPW's major events. Season 1 was the lead up to the company's inaugural major event You Already Know, Season 2 was the lead up to Forever, and Season 3 was the lead up to No Pressure.

=== Season 1 ===
No.	Title	Matches	Stipulations	Time	Original release date	Taped date and location
1	"Season 1, Episode 1"	Lucky Ali defeated Kidd Bandit	Singles match	7:18	December 16, 2021	December 11, 2021; Jacksonville, North Carolina
1	"Season 1, Episode 1"	Bojack defeated Josh Fuller (with Mikey Banker)	DPW Worlds Championship Tournament Quarter Final match	6:42	December 16, 2021	December 11, 2021; Jacksonville, North Carolina
1	"Season 1, Episode 1"	Andrew Everett defeated Rosemary	DPW Worlds Championship Tournament Quarter Final match	14:00	December 16, 2021	December 11, 2021; Jacksonville, North Carolina
2	"Season 1, Episode 2"	KZT defeated Angelica Risk	Singles match	6:45	December 23, 2021	December 11, 2021; Jacksonville, North Carolina
2	"Season 1, Episode 2"	The Reality x NDA (Chance Rizer and Patrick Scott) (with Chris Danger) defeated The Delinquents (Josh Fuller and Mikey Banker)	Tag team match	8:33	December 23, 2021	December 11, 2021; Jacksonville, North Carolina
2	"Season 1, Episode 2"	Calvin Tankman defeated Donnie Ray	DPW Worlds Championship Tournament Quarter Final match	9:01	December 23, 2021	December 11, 2021; Jacksonville, North Carolina
3	"Season 1, Episode 3"	Jakob Hammermeier defeated Matt Lee (pre-show)	Singles match	8:43	December 30, 2021	December 11, 2021; Jacksonville, North Carolina
3	"Season 1, Episode 3"	Kevin Ku defeated Diego Hill	DPW Worlds Championship Tournament Quarter Final match	9:35	December 30, 2021	December 11, 2021; Jacksonville, North Carolina
3	"Season 1, Episode 3"	Raychell Rose defeated Kat Spencer	Singles match	4:10	December 30, 2021	December 11, 2021; Jacksonville, North Carolina
3	"Season 1, Episode 3"	The Reality x NDA (Chance Rizer and Patrick Scott) (with Chris Danger) defeated TSF (Hunter Knott and Rosario Grillo)	Tag team match	3:23	December 30, 2021	December 11, 2021; Jacksonville, North Carolina
4	"Season 1, Episode 4"	Andrew Everett defeated Calvin Tankman	DPW Worlds Championship Tournament Semi Final match	13:23	January 6, 2022	December 11, 2021; Jacksonville, North Carolina
4	"Season 1, Episode 4"	Luther defeated Aaron Cox, Calibus Kingston, Donnie Ray, Kidd Bandit, Lucky Ali, Skyler Mack and Tenshi X	Battle Royal	15:25	January 6, 2022	December 11, 2021; Jacksonville, North Carolina
4	"Season 1, Episode 4"	Bojack defeated Kevin Ku	DPW Worlds Championship Tournament Semi Final match	6:32	January 6, 2022	December 11, 2021; Jacksonville, North Carolina

=== Season 2 ===
No.	Title	Matches	Stipulations	Time	Original release date	Taped date and location
5	"Season 2, Episode 1"	Mason Myles defeated BK Westbrook	Singles match	8:59	March 17, 2022	March 12, 2022; Jacksonville, North Carolina
5	"Season 2, Episode 1"	Sawyer Wreck defeated Genesis	Singles match	0:29	March 17, 2022	March 12, 2022; Jacksonville, North Carolina
5	"Season 2, Episode 1"	Sawyer Wreck defeated Trip Jordy	Singles match	0:53	March 17, 2022	March 12, 2022; Jacksonville, North Carolina
5	"Season 2, Episode 1"	Sawyer Wreck defeated Tenshi X	Singles match	0:30	March 17, 2022	March 12, 2022; Jacksonville, North Carolina
5	"Season 2, Episode 1"	The Reality x NDA (Chance Rizer and Patrick Scott) (with Chris Danger) defeated Chase Holliday and Shawn Kemp	Tag team match	8:50	March 17, 2022	March 12, 2022; Jacksonville, North Carolina
6	"Season 2, Episode 2"	Donnie Ray defeated Jay Malachi and Yoya	Three-way match	9:56	December 30, 2021	March 24, 2022; Jacksonville, North Carolina
6	"Season 2, Episode 2"	Savannah Evans defeated Angelica Risk	Singles match	7:25	December 30, 2021	March 24, 2022; Jacksonville, North Carolina
6	"Season 2, Episode 2"	JTG defeated Kidd Bandit	Singles match	10:03	December 30, 2021	March 24, 2022; Jacksonville, North Carolina
7	"Season 2, Episode 3"	Kidd Bandit defeated Calibus Kingston, Genesis, Gwendolyn Garnet Neodonna, Ishmael Vaughn, Josh Fuller, Mikey Banker, Skyler Mack, Tenshi X, Will Wolfen and Yoscifer (pre-show)	Battle Royal	19:57	March 31, 2022	March 12, 2022; Jacksonville, North Carolina
7	"Season 2, Episode 3"	The Reality x NDA (Chance Rizer and Patrick Scott) defeated TSF (Hunter Knott and Rosario Grillo) (pre-show)	DPW Worlds Tag Team Championship decider match	11:52	March 31, 2022	March 12, 2022; Jacksonville, North Carolina
7	"Season 2, Episode 3"	Diego Hill defeated Lince Dorado	Singles match	10:29	March 31, 2022	March 12, 2022; Jacksonville, North Carolina
7	"Season 2, Episode 3"	The Delinquents (Josh Fuller and Mikey Banker) defeated Skyler Mack and Yoscifer	Tag team match	5:31	March 31, 2022	March 12, 2022; Jacksonville, North Carolina
7	"Season 2, Episode 3"	Lucky Ali defeated Andrew Everett	Singles match	12:34	March 31, 2022	March 12, 2022; Jacksonville, North Carolina
8	"Season 2, Episode 4"	Calvin Tankman defeated Alex Coughlin	Singles match	11:42	April 8, 2022	March 12, 2022; Jacksonville, North Carolina
8	"Season 2, Episode 4"	Aaron Cox defeated AleXevion and James Ryan	Three-way match	2:57	April 8, 2022	March 12, 2022; Jacksonville, North Carolina
8	"Season 2, Episode 4"	Bojack (c) defeated JTG	Singles match for the DPW Worlds Championship	13:51	April 8, 2022	March 12, 2022; Jacksonville, North Carolina

=== Season 3 ===
No.	Title	Matches	Stipulations	Time	Original release date	Taped date and location
9	"Season 3, Episode 1"	Andrew Everett defeated BK Westbrook, Donnie Ray, Gringo Loco and Yoya	Five-way match	9:44	May 20, 2022	May 15, 2022; Jacksonville, North Carolina
9	"Season 3, Episode 1"	Raychell Rose defeated Angelica Risk	DPW Worlds Championship Tournament Quarter Final match	8:08	May 20, 2022	May 15, 2022; Jacksonville, North Carolina
9	"Season 3, Episode 1"	Konosuke Takeshita defeated Adam Brooks	Singles match	8:40	May 20, 2022	May 15, 2022; Jacksonville, North Carolina
10	"Season 3, Episode 2"	Mason Myles defeated Alec Price	DPW National Championship Tournament Quarter Final match	9:37	May 27, 2022	May 15, 2022; Jacksonville, North Carolina
10	"Season 3, Episode 2"	Calvin Tankman defeated Jay Malachi	DPW National Championship Tournament Quarter Final match	13:20	May 27, 2022	May 15, 2022; Jacksonville, North Carolina
10	"Season 3, Episode 2"	The Reality x NDA (Chance Rizer and Patrick Scott) (c) (with Chris Danger) defeated Chaos Project (Luther and Serpentico)	Tag team match for the DPW Worlds Tag Team Championship	12:45	May 27, 2022	May 15, 2022; Jacksonville, North Carolina
11	"Season 3, Episode 3"	Promise Braxton defeated Janai Kai (pre-show)	DPW Women's Worlds Championship Tournament Quarter Final match	5:13	June 3, 2022	May 15, 2022; Jacksonville, North Carolina
11	"Season 3, Episode 3"	Colby Corino defeated Anthony Henry	DPW National Championship Tournament Quarter Final match	14:29	June 3, 2022	May 15, 2022; Jacksonville, North Carolina
11	"Season 3, Episode 3"	Kevin Ku defeated Davey Richards	DPW National Championship Tournament Quarter Final match	15:52	June 3, 2022	May 15, 2022; Jacksonville, North Carolina
11	"Season 3, Episode 3"	Bojack (c) defeated Diego Hill	Singles match for the DPW Worlds Championship	28:14	June 3, 2022	May 15, 2022; Jacksonville, North Carolina
