= DPW Worlds Championship =

Professional wrestling championship

Details
- Promotion: Deadlock Pro-Wrestling
- Date established: December 11, 2021
- Current champion: LaBron Kozone
- Date won: December 12, 2025

Other names
- DPW World Championship; DPW Worlds Heavyweight Championship
Statistics
- First champion: Bojack
- Most reigns: Jake Something (2)
- Longest reign: Lucky Ali (309 days)
- Shortest reign: Jay Malachi (56 days)
- Oldest champion: Jake Something (36 years, 86 days)
- Youngest champion: Jay Malachi (19 years, 275 days)

The DPW Worlds Championship is a professional wrestling world heavyweight championship owned and promoted by Deadlock Pro-Wrestling (DPW). The current champion is LaBron Kozone, who is in his first reign. He won the title by defeating Jake Something in a Winner Takes All match also for Kozone's DPW National Championship, at 4th Anniversary on December 12, 2025, in Cary, North Carolina.

== History ==
On December 11, 2021, Deadlock Pro-Wrestling (DPW) filmed their first DPW Fire episode, where a tournament for the title was started. On January 8, 2022, Bojack defeated Andrew Everett in the tournament finals to become the inaugural world champion.

=== Worlds Championship Eliminator Tournament (2021) ===
First round Fire (December 11, 2021)
Bojack	Pin
Josh Fuller	6:42
Diego Hill
Kevin Ku	Sub
Andrew Everett	Pin
Rosemary	14:00
Calvin Tankman	Pin
Donnie Ray	9:01

Semifinals; Fire (December 11, 2021)
Bojack	Pin
Kevin Ku	6:32
Andrew Everett	Pin
Calvin Tankman	13:23

Final; You Already Know (January 8, 2022)
Bojack	Pin
Andrew Everett	21:57

== Reigns ==
As of November 3, 2026, there have been eight reigns between seven different champions with two vacancies.

The current champion is LaBron Kozone, who is in his first reign. He won the title by defeating Jake Something in a Winner Takes All match also for Kozone's DPW National Championship, at 4th Anniversary on December 12, 2025, in Cary, North Carolina.

Key
No.	Overall reign number
Reign	Reign number for the specific champion
Days	Number of days held
Defenses	Number of successful defenses
+	Current reign is changing daily

No.	Champion	Championship change			Reign statistics			Notes	Ref.
No.	Champion	Date	Event	Location	Reign	Days	Defenses	Notes	Ref.
1	Bojack	January 8, 2022	You Already Know	Raleigh, NC	1	308	6	Defeated Andrew Everett in the finals of a 8-wrestlers single-elimination tournament to become the inaugural champion. Aired on tape delay on January 15.	
2	Lucky Ali	November 12, 2022	World's Strongest	Concord, NC	1	309	6	This was a three-way match, also involving Kidd Bandit. Aired on tape delay on November 19, 2022.	
3	Jay Malachi	September 17, 2023	Carolina Classic	Concord, NC	1	56	2	Aired on tape delay on September 23, 2023.	
—	Vacated	November 12, 2023	World's Strongest	Durham, NC	—	—	—	Jay Malachi relinquished the title after signing with WWE. Aired on tape delay on November 18, 2023.	
4	Calvin Tankman	December 10, 2023	2nd Anniversary	Durham, NC	1	308	12	Defeated Colby Corino to win the vacant championship. Aired on tape delay on December 16, 2023.	
5	Jake Something	October 13, 2024	Super Battle	Charlotte, NC	1	118	3	Aired on tape delay on October 23, 2024.	
—	Vacated	February 8, 2025	—	—	—	—	—	Jake Something vacated the title after suffering a legitimate injury.	
6	Adam Priest	April 18, 2025	Title Fight in Vegas	Las Vegas, NV	1	184	5	This was an Ultimate Conflict match for the vacant championship, which Priest won by last eliminating Calvin Tankman. Aired on tape delay on April 23, 2025.	
7	Jake Something	October 19, 2025	Super Battle	Charlotte, NC	2	54	0	This was a Steel Cage match. Aired on tape delay on October 27, 2025.	
8	LaBron Kozone	December 12, 2025	4th Anniversary	Cary, NC	1	326+	0	This was Winner Takes All match in which Kozone's DPW National Championship was also on the line. Aired on tape delay on December 21, 2025.	

== Combined reigns ==
As of November 3, 2026

†	Indicates the current champion

Rank	Wrestler	No. of reigns	Combined defenses	Combined days
1	LaBron Kozone †	1	0	326+
2	Lucky Ali	1	6	309
3	Calvin Tankman	1	12	308
3	Bojack	1	6	308
5	Adam Priest	1	4	184
6	Jake Something	2	3	172
7	Jay Malachi	1	2	56
