= Heidi Howitzer =

American professional wrestler

Personal information
- Born: October 24, 1989 (age 36) Houston, Texas
- Spouse: Austin Reddick (m. 2020)

Professional wrestling career
- Ring names: Wrecking Ball; Heidi Howitzer
- Billed height: 173 cm (5 ft 8 in)
- Billed weight: 77 kg (170 lb)
- Debut: 2019

Sarah Slack, better known by her ring name Heidi Howitzer, is an American professional wrestler currently working as a freelancer and is best known for her time with Women of Wrestling and Lucha Libre & Laughs. She has also competed in Tokyo Joshi Pro-Wrestling where she is a former Princess Tag Team Champion.

== Professional wrestling career ==
=== American independent circuit (2018–present) ===
Slack made her professional wrestling debut at RMP Supercharged 2 #186, an event promoted by Rocky Mountain Pro on February 28, 2019, where she defeated Simone Lockhart in singles competition. She is known for her tenures with various other promotions from the American independent scene with which she has shared brief or longer stints such as Deadlock Pro-Wrestling, Women of Wrestling, Hoodslam, and many others. She has become the most accomplished in Lucha Libre & Laughs, promotion where she has held the LLL Super Championship one time, the LLL Women's Championship two times, and the LLL Tag Team Championship one time alongside Bentley Powell.

At DPW Spark #5, an event promoted by Deadlock Pro-Wrestling on April 16, 2022, Slack fell short to Savannah Evans in a DPW Women's Worlds Championship Eliminator Tournament First Round match.

=== All Elite Wrestling (2021, 2022) ===
She made her first appearance for All Elite Wrestling (AEW) at AEW Dark #116 from November 9, 2021, where she fell short to Riho. At AEW Dark: Elevation #67 on June 13, 2022, she fell short to Ruby Soho. At AEW Dark: Elevation #68 on June 20, 2022, Slack teamed up with Max the Impaler in a losing effort against Nyla Rose and Marina Shafir.

At ROH on HonorClub #37, an event promoted by Ring of Honor on November 9, 2023, Slack fell short to ROH Women's World Champion Athena in a proving ground match.

=== Japan excursion (2023) ===
In the first half of 2023, Slack went into a competing excursion in Japan alongside "Wasteland War Party" tag team partner and stablemate Max the Impaler. They mainly competed in Tokyo Joshi Pro-Wrestling, where they made their debuts at TJPW Tokyo Joshi Pro '23 on January 4, 2023, by defeating Reiwa Ban AA Cannon (Saki Akai and Yuki Arai) to win the Princess Tag Team Championship. After defending the titles on three separate occasions, both in Japan and the United States, Slack and Max eventually dropped them to 121000000 (Maki Itoh and Miyu Yamashita) at Grand Princess '23 on March 18. Besides TJPW, Slack and Max made an appearance at Judgement 2023, an event promoted by DDT Pro-Wrestling where they teamed up to defeat Antonio Honda and Super Sasadango Machine. Slack and Max wrestled their last match for TJPW at TJPW Live In Los Angeles on March 31, 2023, where they defeated Miu Watanabe and Shoko Nakajima.

== Personal life ==
Slack alongside Max the Impaler became the first all-LGBTQ team to hold the Princess Tag Team Championship for the Tokyo-Joshi Pro Wrestling promotion. She is married to fellow professional wrestler Austin Reddick.

== Championships and accomplishments ==
- FEST Wrestling
  - FEST Tag Team Championship (1 time) – with Leon Ravage
- Lucha Libre & Laughs
  - LLL Super Championship (1 time)
  - LLL Tag Team Championship (1 time) – with Bentley Powell
  - LLL Women's Championship (2 times)
- New South Pro Wrestling
  - New South Tag Team Championship (1 time) – with Max the Impaler
- Pro Wrestling Illustrated
  - Ranked No. 231 of the top 250 female singles wrestlers in the PWI Women's 250 in 2023
  - Ranked Howitzer and Max the Impaler No. 92 of the top 100 tag teams in the PWI Tag Team's 100 in 2023
- Rocky Mountain Pro
  - RMP Lockettes Championship (1 time)
- Tokyo Joshi Pro-Wrestling
  - Princess Tag Team Championship (1 time) – with Max the Impaler
