= Adam Priest =

American professional wrestler (born 1996)

in Battleground Alabama

in Cullman County

- Priest at Death Before Dishonor 2026

Personal information
- Born: February 29, 1996 (age 30) Battleground, Alabama, U.S.

Professional wrestling career
- Ring name: Adam Priest
- Billed height: 5 ft 6 in (168 cm)
- Billed weight: 185 lb (84 kg)
- Trained by: AR Fox; WWA4 Wrestling School
- Debut: 2017

Adam Priest (born February 29, 1996) is an American professional wrestler. He is a freelancer―predominately performing for All Elite Wrestling (AEW), Ring of Honor (ROH), and the independent circuit.

== Professional wrestling career ==
=== Early career (2017–2020) ===
Priest began his professional wrestling career in 2017, mainly wrestling on the American Southeast independent scene.

=== All Elite Wrestling / Ring of Honor (2020–present) ===
On October 14, 2020, Priest made his All Elite Wrestling (AEW) debut on Dark, losing to Alan Angels. Over the next few years, Priest would continue to make appearances on Dark. In 2023, Priest began appearing for AEW's sister promotion Ring of Honor (ROH). On the March 7, 2024, Priest made his Collision debut, losing to Nick Wayne. In 2025, Priest formed a tag team with Tommy Billington.

=== Deadlock Pro-Wrestling (2022–2025) ===
In 2022, Priest made his debut for Deadlock Pro-Wrestling. On July 7, 2024, Priest defeated BK Westbrook and Kevin Blackwood to win the vacant DPW National Championship. On December 8, Priest lost the title to LaBron Kozone, ending his reign at 154 days and five successful defenses. On April 18, 2025, Priest defeated twelve other wrestlers in an elimination match to win the vacant DPW Worlds Championship. On October 19, Priest lost the title to Jake Something in a steel cage match, ending his reign at 184 days and five successful defenses. On December 14 at DPW's 4th Anniversary event, Priest teamed with Trevor Lee in a losing effort against Andrew Everett and BK Westbrook in his final match for DPW before the promotion went on hiatus.

== Championships and accomplishments ==
- ACTION Wrestling
  - ACTION Championship (2 time)
- Deadlock Pro-Wrestling
  - DPW Worlds Championship (1 time)
  - DPW National Championship (1 time)
- New Level Pro Wrestling
  - NLP Middleweight Championship (2 times)
- Rocket City Championship Wrestling
  - RCCW World Heavyweight Championship (1 time)
- New South Pro Wrestling
  - New South Championship (1 time)
  - New South Tag Team Championship (1 time) – with Britt Jackson
  - Heart of the Southern Sixteen Tournament (2021)
- Pro South Wrestling
  - PSW All-Out Championship (1 time)
- Scenic City Invitational
  - Scenic City Invitational Tournament (2024)
- Pro Wrestling Illustrated
  - Ranked No. 59 of the top 500 singles wrestlers in the PWI 500 in 2025
- West Coast Pro Wrestling
  - West Coast Pro Heavyweight Chmpionship (1 time, current)
