= DPW Women's Worlds Championship =

Professional wrestling championship

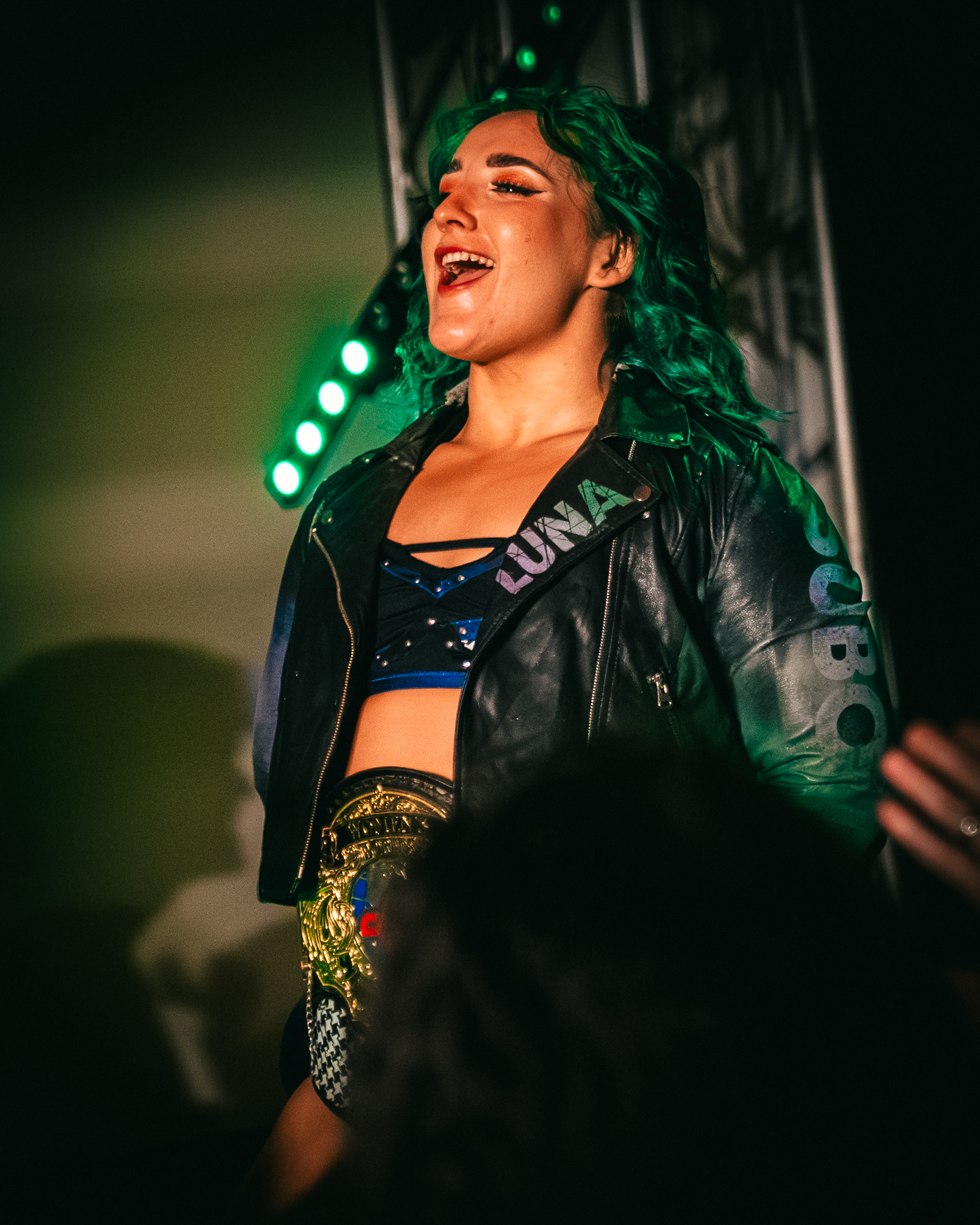
- Dani Luna with the title belt in April 2025

Details
- Promotion: Deadlock Pro-Wrestling
- Date established: March 21, 2022
- Current champion: Mei Suruga
- Date won: December 12, 2025 (aired December 21, 2025)
Statistics
- First champion: Raychell Rose
- Most reigns: All title holders (1)
- Longest reign: Miyuki Takase (413 days)
- Shortest reign: Raychell Rose (126 days)
- Oldest champion: Emi Sakura (46 years, 67 days)

The DPW Women's Worlds Championship is a women's professional wrestling world championship owned and promoted by Deadlock Pro-Wrestling (DPW). Raychell Rose was the inaugural champion. Mei Suruga is the current champion in her first reign. She won the vacant title by defeating Lena Kross at 4th Anniversary on December 12, 2025. Previous champion Queen Aminata vacated the title due to a neck injury.

The title has been defended in the main event of six major DPW events.

== History ==
The title was announced on March 21, 2022, on Twitter and was won by Raychell Rose who defeated Rosemary in a tournament final at Believe the Hype on August 6, 2022.

=== DPW Women's Worlds Championship Tournament (2022) ===
First round Forever (April 16, 2022); Fire (May 15, 2022)
Rosemary	14:38
Hiroyo Matsumoto	Pin
Savannah Evans	7:20
Heidi Howitzer	Pin
Raychell Rose	8:08
Angelica Risk	Pin
Promise Braxton	5:13
Janai Kai	Pin

Semifinals; Showdown In The Carolinas (July 10, 2022)
Rosemary	Pin
Savannah Evans	11:09
Raychell Rose	11:28
Promise Braxton	Pin

Final; Believe The Hype (August 6, 2022)
Rosemary	15:15
Raychell Rose	Pin

== Reigns ==
As of September 25, 2026, there have been seven reigns between seven different champions, with one vacancy. Mei Suruga is the current champion in her first reign. She won the vacant title by defeating Lena Kross at 4th Anniversary on December 12, 2025. Previous champion Queen Aminata vacated the title due to a neck injury.

Key
No.	Overall reign number
Reign	Reign number for the specific champion
Days	Number of days held
Defenses	Number of successful defenses
<1	Reign lasted less than a day
+	Current reign is changing daily

No.	Champion	Championship change			Reign statistics			Notes	Ref.
No.	Champion	Date	Event	Location	Reign	Days	Defenses	Notes	Ref.
1	Raychell Rose	August 6, 2022	Believe The Hype	Raleigh, NC	1	126	2	Defeated Rosemary in a tournament final to become the inaugural champion. Aired on tape delay on August 13.	
2	Emi Sakura	December 10, 2022	1st Anniversary	Winston-Salem, NC	1	365	5	Aired on tape delay on December 17.	
3	Miyuki Takase	December 10, 2023	2nd Anniversary	Durham, NC	1	413	4	Aired on tape delay on December 16.	
4	Dani Luna	January 26, 2025	Title Fight in Texas	Pasadena, TX	1	140	5	Aired on tape delay on February 2.	
5	Nicole Matthews	June 15, 2025	Victory Lap	Durham, NC	1	126	2	This was a Last Chance match. Aired on tape delay on June 22.	
6	Queen Aminata	October 19, 2025	Super Battle	Charlotte, NC	1	54	0	Aired on tape delay on October 26.	
—	Vacated	December 12, 2025	4th Anniversary	Cary, NC	—	—	—	Aminata vacated the title due to a neck injury	
7	Mei Suruga	December 12, 2025	4th Anniversary	Cary, NC	1	287+	3	Defeated Lena Kross to win the vacant title. Aired on tape delay on December 21.	
