= Kevin Blackwood =

American blackjack player

- Born: Maine
- Occupations: Author, Professional Gambler
- Writing career
- Subject: Gambling
- Website: www.kevinblackwood.com

Kevin Blackwood is a professional blackjack player, card counter and gambling author. He is best known for his novel, The Counter, and his instructional book, Play Blackjack Like the Pros.

Blackwood has played in the World Series of Blackjack and the Ultimate Blackjack Tour, a televised 10-week blackjack tournament airing on CBS.

== Bibliography ==
- The Counter (2002)
  A novel following Raven Townsend's quest to earn a million dollars at high-stakes blackjack.
- Play Blackjack Like the Pros (2005)
  Instructional book on winning at blackjack.
- Casino Gambling For Dummies (2006)
  Hands-on guide of insider secrets and tips for maximizing winnings and minimizing losses in the most popular casino games. It is a book for the complete novices in gambling, which includes the basics and the strategies. He also covers manner issues, bluffing and bank roll. He talks about baccarat, blackjack, roulette, slots, craps, poker, keno and bingo. Blackwood narrates horse racing betting and other sports betting.
