= DPW Worlds Tag Team Championship =

Professional wrestling championship

Details
- Promotion: Deadlock Pro-Wrestling
- Date established: March 17, 2022
- Current champions: Miracle Generation (Dustin Waller and Kylon King)
- Date won: December 12, 2025 (aired December 21, 2025)
Statistics
- First champions: The Reality x NDA (Chance Rizer and Patrick Scott)
- Most reigns: Violence is Forever (Dominic Garrini and Kevin Ku) and Miracle Generation (Dustin Waller and Kylon King) (2)
- Longest reign: Speedball x Something (Mike Bailey and Jake Something) (273 days)
- Shortest reign: Bo-Dash (Bojack and Morgan Dash) (35 days)

The DPW Worlds Tag Team Championship is a men's professional wrestling world tag team championship owned and promoted by Deadlock Pro-Wrestling (DPW). The Reality x NDA (Chance Rizer and Patrick Scott) were the inaugural champions. The current champions are Miracle Generation (Dustin Waller and Kylon King), who are in their record-tying second reign as a team and individually. They won the titles by defeating Bo-Dash (Bojack and Morgan Dash) at 4th Anniversary in Cary, North Carolina on December 12, 2025.

The titles have been defended in the main event of seven major DPW events.

== History ==
The DPW Worlds Tag Team Championship was first announced on the March 17, 2022 edition of DPW Fire by Chris Danger. The inaugural champions would be decided at DPW Forever between The Workhorsemen (Anthony Henry and JD Drake) and The Reality x NDA (Chance Rizer and Patrick Scott), the latter team of whom would be the winners.

== Reigns ==
As of May 29, 2026, there have been ten reigns between right different teams composed of 16 individual champions. The current champions are Miracle Generation (Dustin Waller and Kylon King), who are in their record-tying second reign as a team and individually. They won the titles by defeating Bo-Dash (Bojack and Morgan Dash) at 4th Anniversary in Cary, North Carolina on December 12, 2025.

Key
No.	Overall reign number
Reign	Reign number for the specific team—reign numbers for the individuals are in parentheses, if different
Days	Number of days held
Defenses	Number of successful defenses
<1	Reign lasted less than a day
+	Current reign is changing daily

No.	Champion	Championship change			Reign statistics			Notes	Ref.
No.	Champion	Date	Event	Location	Reign	Days	Defenses	Notes	Ref.
1	The Reality x NDA (Chance Rizer and Patrick Scott)	April 16, 2022	Forever	Raleigh, NC	1	238	4	Defeated The Workhorsemen (Anthony Henry and JD Drake) to become the inaugural champions. Aired on tape delay on April 23.	
2	Violence is Forever (Dominic Garrini and Kevin Ku)	December 10, 2022	1st Anniversary	Winston-Salem, NC	1	190	6	Aired on tape delay on December 17.	
3	The Workhorsemen (Anthony Henry and JD Drake)	June 18, 2023	Tag Festival	Durham, NC	1	175	2	This was a four-way tag team elimination match, also featuring Best Bros (Baliyan Akki and Mei Suruga) and Above the Rest (Gabriel Skye and Tristen Thai). Aired on tape delay on June 24.	
4	The Motor City Machine Guns (Alex Shelley and Chris Sabin)	December 10, 2023	2nd Anniversary	Durham, NC	1	91	1	Aired on tape delay on December 16.	
5	Speedball x Something (Mike Bailey and Jake Something)	March 10, 2024	Live 5	Berwyn, IL	1	273	3		
6	Violence is Forever (Dominic Garrini and Kevin Ku)	December 8, 2024	3rd Anniversary	Durham, NC	2	70	1	Aired on tape delay on December 15.	
7	Grizzled Young Veterans (James Drake and Zack Gibson)	February 16, 2025	No Pressure	Chicago, IL	1	147	3	Aired on tape delay on February 23.	
8	Miracle Generation (Dustin Waller and Kylon King)	July 13, 2025	Tag Festival	Durham, NC	1	117	2	This was a four-way tag team elimination match, also featuring The Beast Mortos and Jake Something, and The Workhorsemen (Anthony Henry and JD Drake). Aired on tape delay on July 20, 2025.	
9	Bo‑Dash (Bojack and Morgan Dash)	November 7, 2025	Showdown in Cary II	Cary, NC	1	35	0	Aired on tape delay on November 16, 2025	
10	Miracle Generation (Dustin Waller and Kylon King)	December 12, 2025	4th Anniversary	Cary, NC	2	168+	0	Aired on tape delay on December 22, 2025.	

== Combined reigns ==
As of May 29, 2026.

=== By team ===
†	Indicates the current champions

Rank	Wrestler	No. of reigns	Combined defenses	Combined days
1	Miracle Generation (Dustin Waller and Kylon King) †	2	2	285+
1	Speedball x Something ("Speedball" Mike Bailey and Jake Something)	1	3	273
2	Violence is Forever (Dominic Garrini and Kevin Ku)	2	7	260
4	The Reality x NDA (Chance Rizer and Patrick Scott)	1	4	238
5	The Workhorsemen (Anthony Henry and JD Drake)	1	2	175
6	Grizzled Young Veterans (James Drake and Zack Gibson)	1	3	147
7	The Motor City Machine Guns (Alex Shelley and Chris Sabin)	1	1	91
8	Bo-Dash (Bojack and Morgan Dash)	1	0	35

=== By wrestler ===
Rank	Wrestler	No. of reigns	Combined defenses	Combined days
1	Dustin Waller †	2	2	285+
1	Kylon King †	2	2	285+
3	Jake Something	1	3	273
3	"Speedball" Mike Bailey	1	3	273
5	Dominic Garrini	2	7	260
5	Kevin Ku	2	7	260
7	Chance Rizer	1	4	238
7	Patrick Scott	1	4	238
9	Anthony Henry	1	2	175
9	JD Drake	1	2	175
11	James Drake	1	3	147
11	Zack Gibson	1	3	147
13	Alex Shelley	1	1	91
13	Chris Sabin	1	1	91
15	Bojack	1	0	30
15	Morgan Dash	1	0	30
