= DPW National Championship =

Professional wrestling championship

Details
- Promotion: Deadlock Pro-Wrestling
- Date established: April 28, 2022
- Current champion: LaBron Kozone
- Date won: December 8, 2024
Statistics
- First champion: Calvin Tankman
- Most reigns: All title holders (1)
- Longest reign: LaBron Kozone (517+ days)
- Shortest reign: Calvin Tankman (153 days)
- Oldest champion: Bryan Keith (31 years, 334 days)
- Youngest champion: Calvin Tankman (27 years, 200 days)
- Heaviest champion: Calvin Tankman (381 lb (173 kg))
- Lightest champion: Andrew Everett (214 lb (97 kg))

The DPW National Championship is a professional wrestling championship owned and promoted by Deadlock Pro-Wrestling (DPW). It is the secondary championship in DPW. Calvin Tankman was the inaugural champion. The current champion is LaBron Kozone, who is in his first reign. He won the title by defeating Adam Priest at 3rd Anniversary on December 8, 2024, in Durham, North Carolina. The title has been defended in the main event of six major DPW events.

== History ==
The National Championship was announced on April 28, 2022, on Twitter and was won by Calvin Tankman who defeated Kevin Ku at Showdown In The Carolinas in a tournament finals on July 10, 2022.

=== DPW National Championship Tournament (2022) ===
First round Fire (May 15, 2022)
Calvin Tankman	13:20
Jay Malachi	Pin
Colby Corino	14:29
Anthony Henry	Pin
Mason Myles	9:37
Alec Price	Pin
Kevin Ku	15:52
Davey Richards	Submit

Semifinals; No Pressure (June 5, 2022)
Calvin Tankman	Pin
Colby Corino	10:35
Mason Myles	12:15
Kevin Ku	Pin

Final; Showdown In The Carolinas (July 10, 2022)
Calvin Tankman	22:30
Kevin Ku	Pin

== Reigns ==
As of May 29, 2026, there have been five reigns between five champions, with one vacancy. Calvin Tankman was the inaugural champion. The current champion is LaBron Kozone, who is in his first reign. He won the title by defeating Adam Priest at 3rd Anniversary on December 8, 2024, in Durham, North Carolina.

Key
No.	Overall reign number
Reign	Reign number for the specific champion
Days	Number of days held
Defenses	Number of successful defenses
<1	Reign lasted less than a day
+	Current reign is changing daily

No.	Champion	Championship change			Reign statistics			Notes	Ref.
No.	Champion	Date	Event	Location	Reign	Days	Defenses	Notes	Ref.
1	Calvin Tankman	July 10, 2022	Showdown In The Carolinas	Durham, NC	1	153	2	Defeated Kevin Ku in a tournament final to become the inaugural champion. Aired on tape delay on July 16.	
2	Andrew Everett	December 10, 2022	1st Anniversary	Winston-Salem, NC	1	246	4	Aired on tape delay on December 17.	
3	Bryan Keith	August 13, 2023	Beast Coast	Durham, NC	1	323	5	Aired on tape delay on August 19.	
—	Vacated	July 1, 2024	—	—	—	—	—	Bryan Keith vacated the title after suffering a legitimate injury.	
4	Adam Priest	July 7, 2024	Tag Festival	Raleigh, NC	1	154	5	Defeated BK Westbrook and Kevin Blackwood in a three-way match to win the vacant championship. Aired on tape delay on July 13.	
5	LaBron Kozone	December 8, 2024	3rd Anniversary	Durham, NC	1	537+	9	Aired on tape delay on December 15.	
