= LaBron Kozone =

American professional wrestler and trainer

Personal information
- Born: August 29, 1992 (age 34) Greensboro, North Carolina, U.S.

Professional wrestling career
- Ring name: LaBron Kozone
- Billed height: 6 ft 2 in (188 cm)
- Billed weight: 245 lb (111 kg)
- Billed from: Greensboro, North Carolina
- Trained by: Jeff Rudd; Big Daddy Edwards
- Debut: June 4, 2011

LaBron Kozone (born August 29, 1992) is an American professional wrestler and trainer. He is signed to Major League Wrestling (MLW). He also makes appearances on the independent circuit and is a trainer at the Fire Star Pro Wrestling Training Center in Greensboro, North Carolina.

== Championships and accomplishments ==
- Deadlock Pro-Wrestling
  - DPW Worlds Championship (1 time, current)
  - DPW National Championship (1 time, current)
- Major League Wrestling
  - MLW Southern Crown Championship (1 time, current)
- Pro Wrestling Illustrated
  - Ranked No. 234 in the PWI 500 in 2026
