= Saquon Shugars =

American professional wrestler (born 2000)

Personal information
- Born: Copeland Barbee; April 30, 2000 (age 26) Washington, D.C., U.S.
- Education: Queens University of Charlotte

Professional wrestling career
- Ring name(s): Saquon Shugars; Lucky Ali; Lavar Barbie
- Billed height: 6 ft 1 in (1.85 m)
- Billed weight: 222 lb (101 kg)
- Trained by: Caleb Konley; George South
- Debut: 2018

Copeland Barbee (born April 30, 2000) is an American professional wrestler. He is signed to WWE, where he performs on the NXT brand under the ring name Saquon Shugars.

Barbee was previously known under the ring name Lucky Ali on the independent circuit.

== Professional wrestling career ==
=== Early career (2018–2023) ===
Barbee began training in 2018 under Caleb Konley and George South in North Carolina and made his debut on June 7, 2018 under the ring name Lucky Ali. On April 4, 2022, he debuted in All Elite Wrestling (AEW) in a match taped for AEW Dark Elevation, where he lost to Frankie Kazarian. He also began working for Deadlock Pro-Wrestling around this time, where he won the Carolina Classic and the DPW Worlds Championship. He lost the title to Jay Malachi on September 17, 2023, ending his reign at 309 days. His last appearance for the promotion was at DPW World's Strongest on November 11, 2023, where he lost to Colby Corino in an I Quit match before signing with WWE.

=== WWE (2023–present) ===
Barbee made his WWE debut on the May 15, 2023 edition of Raw as an enhancement talent, under the name Lavar Barbie, where he and his partner Drake Thompson were defeated by Indus Sher (Sanga and Veer). In December 2023, it was reported that Barbee had signed with WWE after completing a tryout, where he would report to the NXT brand. He made his debut under the ring name Saquon Shugars on the March 22, 2024 episode of NXT Level Up, losing to Tavion Heights. In April, he would suffer a knee injury, sidelining him for almost a year. At NXT Vengeance Day on February 15, 2025, Shugars made his return from injury as a member of the new stable DarkState alongside Dion Lennox, Cutler James and Osiris Griffin, where they attacked Fraxiom, Josh Briggs, Yoshiki Inamura, and Oba Femi, establishing himself as a heel in the process. Over the next few weeks, they would attack and lay out several wrestlers, claiming that "nobody is safe". On the April 8 episode of NXT, Lennox, James and Shugars defeated Trick Williams, Je'Von Evans and Femi in a six-man tag team match in their first match as a team. At NXT Stand & Deliver on April 19, Lennox, Osiris and Shugars defeated The Family (Tony D'Angelo, Channing "Stacks" Lorenzo, and Luca Crusifino) in a six-man tag team match. On the December 10 episode of NXT, Lennox handed Shugars his half of the NXT Tag Team Championship in order to focus on the Iron Survivor match at NXT Deadline, thus making Shugars a champion alongside Griffin.

On the May 19, 2026, episode of NXT, after failing to regain the NXT Tag Team Championship, this time held by The Vanity Project, DarkState would brutally assault Shugars after the match, thus removing him from the group and turning him face for the first time in WWE. Shugars and DarkState leader Dion Lennox would face each other in a short feud, first at The Great American Bash, and then in a Weaponized Steel Cage match on the 25 August episode of NXT, with Shugars winning both matches. On the 8 September episode of NXT, Shugars, Mason Rook, and Tony D'Angelo defeated Cruz Montana, EK Prosper, and Keanu Carver in a Six-Man Tag Team match to qualify for the NXT Championship No. 1 contender's Triple Threat match the following week, which Shugars lost when Tristan Angels pulled the referee out of the ring as he was counting the pinfall, and the match was eventually won by Mason Rook.

=== Total Nonstop Action Wrestling (2025) ===
On the July 3, 2025 episode of Impact!, Barbee, as Saquon Shugars, made his Total Nonstop Action Wrestling (TNA) debut alongside Darkstate where they attacked Matt Cardona.

== Championships and accomplishments ==
- American Combat Wrestling
  - ACW Heavyweight Championship (1 time)
- Deadlock Pro-Wrestling
  - DPW Worlds Championship (1 time)
  - DPW Carolina Classic Tournament (2022)
- Full Impact Pro
  - FIP World Heavyweight Championship (1 time)
- Pro Wrestling Illustrated
  - Ranked No. 412 of the top 500 singles wrestlers in the PWI 500 in 2023
- Premiere Wrestling Xperience
  - PWX Innovative Television Championship (1 time)
- WWE
  - NXT Tag Team Championship (1 time) – with Osiris Griffin
