= King of Kings (2025) =

2025 DDT Pro-Wrestling event

King of Kings: Storm's June Showdown
- Official poster of the event featuring Chris Brookes and Kazusada Higuchi
- Promotion: CyberFight
- Brand: DDT
- Date: June 29, 2025
- City: Tokyo, Japan
- Venue: Korakuen Hall
- Tagline: All or Nothing: The Ultimate Showdown (Note: Japanese: 乾坤一擲 頂上決戦, Hepburn: Kenkon'itteki Chōjō Kessen)

Event chronology
← Previous; Judgement 2025	Next → Rock in Ring 2025

King of Kings chronology
← Previous; First	Next → 2026

King of Kings: Storm's June Showdown (Japanese: KING OF KINGS ～嵐の6月決戦～, Hepburn: King of Kings: Arashi no Rokugatsu Kessen) was a professional wrestling event promoted by CyberFight's sub-brand DDT Pro-Wrestling (DDT). It took place on June 29, 2025, in Tokyo, Japan, at the Korakuen Hall. The event aired on CyberFight's streaming service Wrestle Universe.

The main event saw 2025 King of DDT Tournament winner Kazusada Higuchi defeat Chris Brookes to win the KO-D Openweight Championship .

== Production ==
=== Background ===
The event featured professional wrestling matches that resulted from scripted storylines, where wrestlers portrayed villains, heroes, or less distinguishable characters in the scripted events that built tension and culminated in a wrestling match or series of matches.

=== Storylines ===
On May 25, 2025, Kazusada Higuchi defeated Kanon in the final of the 2025 King of DDT Tournament to earn an opportunity to challenge for the KO-D Openweight Championship held by Chris Brookes. The challenge was made official at a press conference on May 27.

June 29, 2025 marked the 25th anniversary of the Ironman Heavymetalweight Championship. On May 31, Poison Sawada Julie, its creator and inaugural champion, won the title back for a tenth time. He announced that he would unveil a new belt for the title at King of Kings.

=== Event ===
The event began with a pre-show match in which Harimau (Naomi Yoshimura and Yuki Ishida) defeated Akito and Kazuma Sumi.

==== Preliminary matches ====
The main card opened with a six-man tag team match, where Jun Akiyama, Daichi Satoh and Soma Takao defeated Toru Owashi, Antonio Honda and Takeshi Masada.

This was followed by a tag team bout in which MxM Collection (Mansoor and Mason Madden) defeated Danshoku Dino and Kazuki Hirata.

Afterwards, 1,748th Ironman Heavymetalweight Champion Poison Sawada Julie introduced the new title belt, replacing the original belt after 25 years of use. Sanshiro Takagi used this opportunity to hit him with a stunner and pin him to become the new champion.

In the following bout, Damnation T.A. (MJ Paul and Ilusion) defeated Harashima and Kumadori.

Next, Daisuke Sasaki and Hideki Okatani won a three-way tag team match against Strange Love Connection (Mao and Kanon) and The37Kamiina (Shunma Katsumata and To-y) when Sasaki submitted Katsumata with the "La Mistica Crossface".

Then, Minoru Suzuki and Yuki Ueno defeated Shinya Aoki and Yuya Koroku.

In the semi main event, The Apex (Yuki Iino and Yukio Naya) defeated Astronauts (Fuminori Abe and Takuya Nomura) to win the KO-D Tag Team Championship, ending Astronauts' reign at 101 days and five defenses.

==== Main event ====
In the main event, 2025 King of DDT Tournament winner Kazusada Higuchi defeated Chris Brookes with the "Claw Slam" to win the KO-D Openweight Championship, ending Brookes' reign at 237 days and four defenses.

== Results ==
No.	Results	Stipulations	Times
1^{P}	Harimau (Naomi Yoshimura and Yuki Ishida) defeated Akito and Kazuma Sumi	Tag team match	6:49
2	Jun Akiyama, Daichi Sato and Soma Takao defeated Toru Owashi, Antonio Honda and Takeshi Masada	Six-man tag team match	8:53
3	MxM Collection (Mansoor and Mason Madden) defeated Danshoku Dino and Kazuki Hirata	Tag team match	8:57
4	Damnation T.A. (MJ Paul and Ilusion) defeated Harashima and Kumadori	Tag team match	10:43
5	Damnation T.A. (Daisuke Sasaki and Hideki Okatani) defeated Strange Love Connection (Mao and Kanon) (with Kimihiro) and The37Kamiina (Shunma Katsumata and To-y)	Three-way tag team match	8:39
6	Minoru Suzuki and Yuki Ueno defeated Shinya Aoki and Yuya Koroku	Tag team match	14:03
7	The Apex (Yuki Iino and Yukio Naya) defeated Astronauts (Fuminori Abe and Takuya Nomura) (c)	Tag team match for the KO-D Tag Team Championship	14:14
8	Kazusada Higuchi defeated Chris Brookes (c)	Singles match for the KO-D Openweight Championship	20:43
(c) / – the champion(s) heading into the match; P / – the match was broadcast on the pre-show
