= AEW Rampage =

Professional wrestling television program

- AEW Rampage logo (2024)
- Genre: Professional wrestling
- Created by: Tony Khan
- Starring: AEW roster
- Country of origin: United States
- Original language: English
- No. of seasons: 4
- No. of episodes: 177 (list of episodes)

Production
- Producer: Tony Khan (Head of Creative)
- Camera setup: Multi-camera setup
- Running time: 60 minutes (including commercials)
- Production company: All Elite Wrestling

Original release
- Network: TNT
- Release: August 13, 2021 – December 27, 2024

Related
- AEW Dynamite; AEW Collision; AEW Battle of the Belts

AEW Rampage, also known as Friday Night Rampage or simply Rampage, is an American professional wrestling television program that was produced by the American promotion All Elite Wrestling (AEW), running from August 13, 2021, to December 27, 2024. It aired every Friday at 10 p.m. Eastern Time (ET) on TNT in the United States, although major sporting events occasionally moved it to an earlier or later time slot the same day or the next day (as a special Saturday Night Rampage).

Rampage was AEW's second weekly television show, following the premiere of Dynamite, and the second professional wrestling program to air on TNT since the final episode of WCW Monday Nitro on March 26, 2001. With the premiere of Collision in June 2023 (which subsequently became AEW's secondary flagship program), and the cancellation of AEW's YouTube shows (Dark and Elevation), Rampage essentially succeeded the YouTube shows by focusing on younger and mid-to-low card talent. The series came to an end on December 27, 2024, as the program was not included in AEW's media rights deal with Warner Bros. Discovery that took effect on January 1, 2025.

Episodes of Rampage were typically taped after the live broadcast of the preceding episode of Dynamite. On occasion, some episodes were also taped after Collision, while a select few episodes had aired live, notably those that aired back-to-back with the Battle of the Belts special.

== History ==
=== Original format (2021–2023) ===
The American professional wrestling promotion All Elite Wrestling (AEW) was officially announced and launched on January 1, 2019, and their weekly flagship television program, Dynamite, began airing on TNT that October. On January 15, 2020, TNT's parent company WarnerMedia (now Warner Bros. Discovery) and AEW announced a US$175 million contract extension for Dynamite through 2023. As part of the new deal, it was also announced that AEW would be launching a second weekly television show.

In May 2021, AEW revealed their second weekly television show, and fourth program overall, as AEW Rampage, which would begin airing on TNT on August 13 as a one-hour show on Fridays at 10pm Eastern Time (ET). During AEW's marquee event Double or Nothing on May 30, former WWE wrestler Mark Henry was announced to be a part of the Rampage commentary team as an analyst. On August 4, Dynamite and Dark's commentators Excalibur and Taz and wrestler Chris Jericho, who had served as a guest commentator several times on Dynamite, were announced to join Henry as Rampage's four-man commentary team. AEW President and Chief Executive Officer Tony Khan said that the commentary team would not always be all four men, as Henry would also have other roles on the show, such as doing interviews. In September, AEW wrestler Ricky Starks replaced Henry on the commentary team, with Henry subsequently just doing interviews on the show.

In an interview with PWInsider, Khan stated that while Rampage would air live for most episodes, some episodes they would pre-tape, depending on the city that the preceding episode of Dynamite was held in (although this would later shift to most episodes being taped in conjunction with Dynamite with only a few airing live). He also said that Rampage would serve as the go-home show for AEW's pay-per-view (PPV) events, due to the show airing two days before those events. Rampage in turn replaced that role for Dark as although Dark normally aired on Tuesdays, it would instead air on Fridays during the week of a PPV to serve as the go-home show. Khan also said that Warner had asked him if he would rather expand Wednesday's Dynamite to three hours, but he rejected the notion, stating that he did not want to run Dynamite for that length as he highly preferred that third hour as a separate show on a different night. He also claimed that Rampage would not be a secondary show to Dynamite, and that it would be its partner or its equivalent. He further said that Dynamite and Rampage would be AEW's core properties, while their YouTube shows, Dark and Dark: Elevation, would be their peripheral properties, essentially their developmental programs.

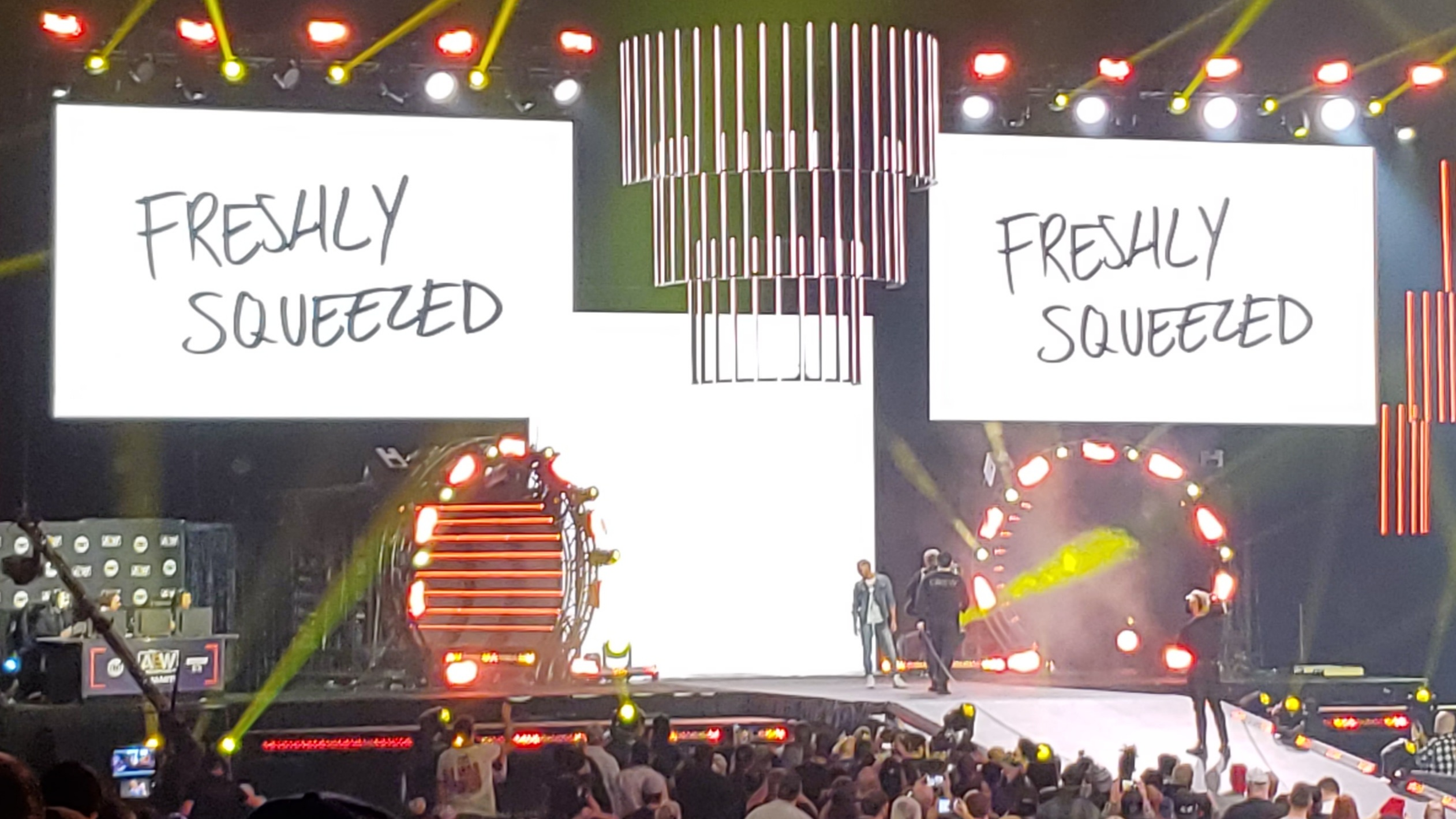
The Rampage set used from August 13, 2021, to December 30, 2022. It had also been used for Dynamite, Battle of the Belts, and some pay-per-view events.

Rampage aired immediately following WWE's own Friday television program, SmackDown, which aired on Fox and then USA Network beginning in September 2024. Although Dynamite had run against WWE's NXT from October 2019 to April 2021, there was expectation that there would be no overlap between Rampage and SmackDown in nearly the entire country (Note: Honolulu Fox affiliate KHON-TV aired WWE SmackDown at 7–9pm Hawaii time. TNT and TBS's West Coast feeds aired Rampage at 8pm in Hawaii during Pacific Standard Time and 7pm in Hawaii during Pacific Daylight Time.) unless SmackDown were to run over its scheduled endtime of 10pm ET, when Rampage began broadcasting. Throughout Rampage's 2.5 year broadcast history, this only occurred once, which was on October 15, 2021. That night, SmackDown aired a special episode titled "Supersized SmackDown", which extended its runtime to 10:30pm with the additional 30 minutes airing commercial free, therefore directly competing with Rampage for its first 30 minutes. SmackDown had also aired on Fox's sister channel FS1 due to the MLB playoffs airing on Fox, which also decreased SmackDown's normal average viewership. During the 30 minutes that the shows went head-to-head, Rampage beat SmackDown in the key demographic of viewers aged 18 to 49, drawing 328,000 views to SmackDown's 285,000 views.

It was initially announced that both Dynamite and Rampage would be moving to TNT's sister channel TBS, also owned by WarnerMedia, in January 2022. However, on September 23, 2021, it was revealed that Rampage would remain on TNT while only Dynamite would move to TBS.

The May 6 and May 13, 2022, episodes of Rampage were moved to 5:30 p.m. ET in order to accommodate TNT's coverage of the NHL Stanley Cup playoffs. The May 20 episode was moved to 7 p.m. ET to make way for TNT's coverage of the NBA Western Conference finals.

=== Final format (2023–2024) ===
As a result of an amended broadcasting deal with Warner Bros. Discovery, AEW added a third weekly program on Saturday nights called Collision, which premiered in June 2023 on TNT. The YouTube shows, Dark and Elevation, were subsequently canceled to make way for Collision, which was positioned as AEW's second main program, while Rampage shifted to focusing on younger wrestlers, essentially becoming what the YouTube shows were for the company.

Due to the NCAA March Madness coverage occurring on March 22, 2024, on TNT, Rampage instead aired live on March 20 immediately after Dynamite, with both programs airing on TBS. This would be the only time for the program to air on TBS.

During the tapings on December 22, 2024, Tony Khan announced that the December 27 episode, which was the New Year's Smash special, would be the final episode of Rampage as the program was not included in AEW's new media rights agreement with Warner Bros. Discovery, which took effect on January 1, 2025.

== Episodes ==
=== 2021 ===
No.	Date	Location	Venue	Main event
1	August 13, 2021	Pittsburgh, Pennsylvania	Petersen Events Center	Dr. Britt Baker, D.M.D. (c) vs. Red Velvet for the AEW Women's World Championship
2	August 20, 2021 (The First Dance)	Chicago, Illinois	United Center	Jon Moxley vs. Daniel Garcia
3	August 27, 2021	Milwaukee, Wisconsin	UW–Milwaukee Panther Arena	Christian Cage and Frankie Kazarian vs. Brandon Cutler and Kenny Omega
4	September 3, 2021	Hoffman Estates, Illinois	NOW Arena	Darby Allin vs. Daniel Garcia
5	September 10, 2021	Cincinnati, Ohio	Fifth Third Arena	Brian Pillman Jr. vs. Max Caster
6	September 17, 2021	Newark, New Jersey	Prudential Center	Miro (c) vs. Fuego Del Sol for the AEW TNT Championship
7	September 24, 2021 (Grand Slam)	Queens, New York	Arthur Ashe Stadium	Eddie Kingston and Jon Moxley vs. Minoru Suzuki and Lance Archer in a Lights Out match
8	October 1, 2021	Rochester, New York	Blue Cross Arena	Orange Cassidy vs. Jack Evans in a Hair vs. Hair match
9	October 8, 2021	Philadelphia, Pennsylvania	Liacouras Center	Ricky Starks (c) vs. Brian Cage in a Philly Street Fight for the FTW Championship
10	October 15, 2021	Miami, Florida	James L. Knight Center	The Inner Circle (Chris Jericho, Jake Hager and Sammy Guevara) vs. Men of the Year (Ethan Page and Scorpio Sky) and Junior dos Santos
11	October 22, 2021	Miami, Florida	James L. Knight Center	PAC vs. Andrade El Idolo
12	October 29, 2021	Boston, Massachusetts	Agganis Arena	Dr. Britt Baker, D.M.D. vs. Abadon in a Trick or Treat match
13	November 5, 2021	St. Louis, Missouri	Chaifetz Arena	Adam Cole vs. John Silver
14	November 12, 2021	Minneapolis, Minnesota	Target Center	Matt Hardy vs. Orange Cassidy in a Lumberjack match
15	November 19, 2021	Norfolk, Virginia	Chartway Arena	Adam Cole and Bobby Fish vs. Jurassic Express (Jungle Boy and Luchasaurus)
16	November 26, 2021	Chicago, Illinois	Wintrust Arena	Eddie Kingston vs. Daniel Garcia
17	December 3, 2021	Duluth, Georgia	Gas South Arena	Death Triangle (PAC and Penta El Zero Miedo) vs. FTR (Cash Wheeler and Dax Harwood)
18	December 10, 2021	Elmont, New York	UBS Arena	Adam Cole vs. Wheeler Yuta
19	December 17, 2021 (Winter Is Coming)	Garland, Texas	Curtis Culwell Center	The Acclaimed (Anthony Bowens and Max Caster), 2point0 (Jeff Parker and Matt Lee) and Daniel Garcia vs. Santana and Ortiz, The Lucha Brothers (Penta El Zero Miedo and Rey Fenix) and Eddie Kingston
20	December 25, 2021 (Holiday Bash)	Greensboro, North Carolina	Greensboro Coliseum	Sammy Guevara (c) vs. Cody Rhodes for the AEW TNT Championship
21	December 31, 2021 (New Year's Smash)	Jacksonville, Florida	Daily's Place	Cody Rhodes (c) vs. Ethan Page for the AEW TNT Championship

=== 2022 ===
No.	Date	Location	Venue	Main event
22	January 7, 2022	Newark, New Jersey	Prudential Center	Daniel Garcia and 2point0 (Jeff Parker and Matt Lee) vs. Eddie Kingston, Santana and Ortiz in a Street Fight
23	January 14, 2022	Raleigh, North Carolina	PNC Arena	Jurassic Express (Jungle Boy and Luchasaurus) (c) vs. The Dark Order (John Silver and Alex Reynolds) for the AEW World Tag Team Championship
24	January 21, 2022	Washington, D.C.	Entertainment & Sports Arena	Jade Cargill (c) vs. Anna Jay for the AEW TBS Championship
25	January 28, 2022 (Beach Break Championship Friday)	Cleveland, Ohio	Wolstein Center	Jurassic Express (Jungle Boy and Luchasaurus) (c) vs. Private Party (Isiah Kassidy and Marq Quen) for the AEW World Tag Team Championship
26	February 4, 2022	Chicago, Illinois	Wintrust Arena	Ricky Starks (c) vs. Jay Lethal for the FTW Championship
27	February 11, 2022	Atlantic City, New Jersey	Boardwalk Hall	Jurassic Express (Jungle Boy and Luchasaurus) (c) vs. The Gunn Club (Austin and Colten Gunn) for the AEW World Tag Team Championship
28	February 18, 2022 (Slam Dunk)	Nashville, Tennessee	Nashville Municipal Auditorium	Trent Beretta vs. Jay White
29	February 25, 2022	Bridgeport, Connecticut	Webster Bank Arena	Orange Cassidy vs. Anthony Bowens
30	March 4, 2022	Orlando, Florida	Addition Financial Arena	Ethan Page vs. Christian Cage
31	March 11, 2022	Estero, Florida	Hertz Arena	Shane "Swerve" Strickland vs. Tony Nese
32	March 18, 2022	San Antonio, Texas	Freeman Coliseum	Keith Lee vs. Max Caster
33	March 25, 2022	Austin, Texas	H-E-B Center	Ricky Starks (c) vs. Swerve Strickland for the FTW Championship
34	April 1, 2022	Columbia, South Carolina	Colonial Life Arena	Powerhouse Hobbs vs. Keith Lee
35	April 8, 2022	Boston, Massachusetts	Agganis Arena	Jon Moxley vs. Wheeler Yuta
36	April 15, 2022	Garland, Texas	Curtis Culwell Center	"Hangman" Adam Page (c) vs. Adam Cole in a Texas Deathmatch for the AEW World Championship
37	April 22, 2022	Pittsburgh, Pennsylvania	Petersen Events Center	Jade Cargill (c) vs. Marina Shafir for the AEW TBS Championship
38	April 29, 2022	Philadelphia, Pennsylvania	Liacouras Center	Samoa Joe (c) vs. Trent Beretta for the ROH World Television Championship
39	May 6, 2022	Baltimore, Maryland	Chesapeake Employers Insurance Arena	Jay Lethal vs. Konosuke Takeshita
40	May 13, 2022	Long Island, New York	UBS Arena	Scorpio Sky (c) vs. Frankie Kazarian for the AEW TNT Championship
41	May 20, 2022	Houston, Texas	Fertitta Center	Blackpool Combat Club (Bryan Danielson and Jon Moxley) vs. Dante Martin and Matt Sydal
42	May 27, 2022	Las Vegas, Nevada	Michelob Ultra Arena	Kris Statlander vs. Ruby Soho
43	June 3, 2022	Ontario, California	Toyota Arena	Scorpio Sky (c) vs. Dante Martin for the AEW TNT Championship
44	June 10, 2022	Independence, Missouri	Cable Dahmer Arena	FTR (Cash Wheeler and Dax Harwood) and Trent Beretta vs. Will Ospreay and Aussie Open (Kyle Fletcher and Mark Davis)
45	June 17, 2022 (Road Rager)	St. Louis, Missouri	Chaifetz Arena	Darby Allin vs. Bobby Fish
46	June 24, 2022	Milwaukee, Wisconsin	UW–Milwaukee Panther Arena	Jeff Cobb vs. Cash Wheeler
47	July 1, 2022 (Royal Rampage)	Detroit, Michigan	Little Caesars Arena	Nyla Rose vs. Toni Storm
48	July 8, 2022	Rochester, New York	Blue Cross Arena	Orange Cassidy vs. Tony Nese
49	July 15, 2022 (Fyter Fest)	Savannah, Georgia	Enmarket Arena	The Lucha Brothers (Rey Fenix and Penta Oscuro) vs. Private Party (Isiah Kassidy and Marq Quen)
50	July 22, 2022 (Fyter Fest)	Duluth, Georgia	Gas South Arena	Jay Lethal vs. Christopher Daniels
51	July 29, 2022 (Fight for the Fallen)	Worcester, Massachusetts	DCU Center	Anna Jay vs. Ruby Soho
52	August 5, 2022	Grand Rapids, Michigan	Van Andel Arena	Swerve In Our Glory (Keith Lee and Swerve Strickland) vs. Josh Woods and Tony Nese in a Street Fight
53	August 12, 2022	Minneapolis, Minnesota	Target Center	Orange Cassidy vs. Ari Daivari
54	August 19, 2022	Charleston, West Virginia	Charleston Coliseum	Best Friends (Chuck Taylor and Trent Beretta) and Orange Cassidy vs. The Trustbusters (Ari Daivari, Parker Boudreaux and Slim J)
55	August 26, 2022	Cleveland, Ohio	Wolstein Center	Claudio Castagnoli (c) vs. Dustin Rhodes for the ROH World Championship
56	September 2, 2022	Chicago, Illinois	Now Arena	Ricky Starks vs. QT Marshall
57	September 9, 2022	Buffalo, New York	KeyBank Center	Claudio Castagnoli (c) vs. Dax Harwood for the ROH World Championship
58	September 16, 2022	Albany, New York	MVP Arena	Samoa Joe (c) vs. Josh Woods for the ROH World Television Championship
59	September 23, 2022 (Grand Slam)	Queens, New York	Arthur Ashe Stadium	Powerhouse Hobbs vs. Ricky Starks in a Lights Out match
60	September 30, 2022	Philadelphia, Pennsylvania	Liacouras Center	John Silver vs. Rush
61	October 7, 2022	Washington D.C.	Entertainment and Sports Arena	Death Triangle (PAC, Penta El Zero Miedo and Rey Fenix) (c) vs. The Dark Order (Alex Reynolds, John Silver and 10) for the AEW World Trios Championship
62	October 14, 2022	Toronto, Ontario	Coca-Cola Coliseum	FTR (Cash Wheeler and Dax Harwood) and Shawn Spears vs. The Embassy (Kaun, Brian Cage and Toa Liona)
63	October 21, 2022	Jacksonville, Florida	Daily's Place	Orange Cassidy (c) vs. Preston Vance vs. Rush for the AEW All-Atlantic Championship
64	October 28, 2022	Uncasville, Connecticut	Mohegan Sun Arena	Wardlow (c) vs. Matt Taven for the AEW TNT Championship
65	November 4, 2022	Atlantic City, New Jersey	Jim Whelan Boardwalk Hall	WarJoe (Wardlow and Samoa Joe) vs. Gates of Agony (Kaun and Toa Liona)
66	November 11, 2022	Boston, Massachusetts	Agganis Arena	Orange Cassidy (c) vs. Lee Johnson for the AEW All-Atlantic Championship
67	November 18, 2022	Newark, New Jersey	Prudential Center	Jun Akiyama and Konosuke Takeshita vs. Eddie Kingston and Ortiz
68	November 25, 2022	Chicago, Illinois	Wintrust Arena	Rush and the Butcher and the Blade vs. The Dark Order (John Silver, Alex Reynolds and Preston Vance)
69	December 2, 2022	Indianapolis, Indiana	Indiana Farmers Coliseum	Orange Cassidy (c) vs. QT Marshall in a Lumberjack match for the AEW All-Atlantic Championship
70	December 9, 2022	Cedar Park, Texas	H-E-B Center at Cedar Park	Orange Cassidy (c) vs. Trent Seven for the AEW All-Atlantic Championship
71	December 16, 2022 (Winter Is Coming)	Garland, Texas	Curtis Culwell Center	Best Friends (Chuck Taylor, Orange Cassidy and Trent Beretta) and Dustin Rhodes vs. Kip Sabian and The Butcher and The Blade (The Blade and The Butcher) and Trent Seven
72	December 23, 2022 (Holiday Bash)	San Antonio, Texas	Freeman Coliseum	Jay Lethal and Jeff Jarrett vs. Anthony Bowens and Daddy Ass
73	December 30, 2022 (New Year's Smash)	Broomfield, Colorado	1stBank Center	Swerve Strickland vs. Wheeler Yuta

=== 2023 ===
No.	Date	Location	Venue	Main event
74	January 6, 2023	Portland, Oregon	Veterans Memorial Coliseum	Darby Allin (c) vs. Mike Bennett for the AEW TNT Championship
75	January 13, 2023	Inglewood, California	Kia Forum	Ruby Soho and Willow Nightingale vs. TayJay A.S. (Anna Jay A.S. and Tay Melo) in a Street Fight
76	January 20, 2023	Fresno, California	Save Mart Center	Action Andretti vs. Daniel Garcia
77	January 27, 2023	Lexington, Kentucky	Rupp Arena	Jamie Hayter vs. Emi Sakura
78	February 3, 2023	Fairborn, Ohio	Nutter Center	Rush vs. Christopher Daniels
79	February 10, 2023	El Paso, Texas	El Paso County Coliseum	Orange Cassidy (c) vs. Lee Moriarty for the AEW All-Atlantic Championship
80	February 17, 2023 (Slam Dunk)	Laredo, Texas	Sames Auto Arena	Dustin Rhodes vs. Swerve Strickland
81	February 24, 2023	Phoenix, Arizona	Footprint Center	Sammy Guevara vs. Action Andretti
82	March 3, 2023	Daly City, California	Cow Palace	Keith Lee and Dustin Rhodes vs. Mogul Affiliates (Swerve Strickland and Parker Boudreaux)
83	March 10, 2023	Sacramento, California	Golden 1 Center	Riho vs. Nyla Rose
84	March 17, 2023 (St. Patrick's Day Slam)	Winnipeg, Manitoba	Canada Life Centre	Daniel Garcia vs. Brody King
85	March 25, 2023	Independence, Missouri	Cable Dahmer Arena	The Acclaimed (Anthony Bowens and Max Caster) vs. The Kingdom (Matt Taven and Mike Bennett)
86	March 31, 2023	St. Louis, Missouri	Chaifetz Arena	Juice Robinson vs. Action Andretti
87	April 7, 2023	Kingston, Rhode Island	Ryan Center	Anna Jay A.S. vs. Julia Hart
88	April 14, 2023	Milwaukee, Wisconsin	UW–Milwaukee Panther Arena	"Jungle Boy" Jack Perry vs. Shawn Spears
89	April 22, 2023	Pittsburgh, Pennsylvania	Petersen Events Center	El Hijo del Vikingo (c) vs. Dralístico for the AAA Mega Championship
90	April 28, 2023	Sunrise, Florida	FLA Live Arena	Jay Lethal vs. Cash Wheeler
91	May 5, 2023	Baltimore, Maryland	CFG Bank Arena	The Hardys (Jeff Hardy and Matt Hardy), Hook and Isiah Kassidy vs. The Firm (Stokely Hathaway, Ethan Page, Lee Moriarty and Big Bill) in The Firm Deletion match
92	May 13, 2023	Detroit, Michigan	Little Caesars Arena	The Mogul Embassy (Brian Cage and Swerve Strickland) vs. The Dark Order (Alex Reynolds and John Silver)
93	May 19, 2023	Austin, Texas	Moody Center	Dustin Rhodes vs. Bishop Kaun
94	May 26, 2023	Las Vegas, Nevada	MGM Grand Garden Arena	Best Friends (Chuck Taylor and Trent Beretta) vs. Lee Moriarty and Big Bill
95	June 2, 2023 (Championship Friday)	San Diego, California	Viejas Arena	Katsuyori Shibata (c) vs. Lee Moriarty for the ROH Pure Championship
96	June 9, 2023	Colorado Springs, Colorado	Broadmoor World Arena	Skye Blue vs. Nyla Rose vs. Dr. Britt Baker, D.M.D. vs. Mercedes Martinez to determine the #1 contender to the AEW Women's World Championship
97	June 16, 2023	Washington D.C.	Capital One Arena	Konosuke Takeshita vs. Bandido
98	June 23, 2023	Chicago, Illinois	Wintrust Arena	"Jungle Boy" Jack Perry vs. Douki
99	June 30, 2023	Hamilton, Ontario	FirstOntario Centre	Hikaru Shida vs. Taya Valkyrie
100	July 7, 2023 (Rampage 100)	Edmonton, Alberta	Rogers Place	Brian Cage and Big Bill vs. Matt Sydal and Trent Beretta in a Blind Eliminator Tag Team Tournament Quarterfinal match
101	July 14, 2023	Saskatoon, Saskatchewan	SaskTel Centre	Athena vs. Willow Nightingale in a Women's Owen Hart Cup Tournament Semifinal match
102	July 21, 2023 (Royal Rampage)	Boston, Massachusetts	TD Garden	Kris Statlander (c) vs. Marina Shafir for the AEW TBS Championship
103	July 28, 2023	Albany, New York	MVP Arena	Hikaru Shida vs. Nyla Rose
104	August 4, 2023	Tampa, Florida	Yuengling Center	Blackpool Combat Club (Jon Moxley and Claudio Castagnoli) vs. Best Friends (Chuck Taylor and Trent Beretta) in a Parking Lot Fight
105	August 11, 2023	Columbus, Ohio	Nationwide Arena	Saraya vs. Skye Blue for a spot on the AEW Women's World Championship match at All In
106	August 18, 2023 (Fight for the Fallen)	Nashville, Tennessee	Bridgestone Arena	Hikaru Shida and Skye Blue vs. The Outcasts (Toni Storm and Ruby Soho)
107	August 25, 2023 (Fyter Fest)	Lexington, Kentucky	Rupp Arena	The Outcasts (Saraya and Toni Storm) vs. Dr. Britt Baker, D.M.D. and Hikaru Shida
108	September 1, 2023	Hoffman Estates, Illinois	Now Arena	Willow Nightingale and Skye Blue vs. Anna Jay and Taya Valkyrie
109	September 8, 2023	Indianapolis, Indiana	Indiana Farmers Coliseum	Samoa Joe vs. Jeff Hardy in a Grand Slam World Championship Eliminator Tournament Quarterfinal match
110	September 15, 2023	Cincinnati, Ohio	Heritage Bank Center	Kris Statlander (c) vs. Jade Cargill for the AEW TBS Championship
111	September 22, 2023 (Grand Slam)	Queens, New York	Arthur Ashe Stadium	Mogul Embassy (Brian Cage, Bishop Kaun, and Toa Liona) (c) vs. The Elite ("Hangman" Adam Page and The Young Bucks (Nick Jackson and Matt Jackson)) for the ROH World Six-Man Tag Team Championship
112	September 29, 2023	Broomfield, Colorado	1stBank Center	Hikaru Shida vs. Ruby Soho
113	October 6, 2023	Stockton, California	Stockton Arena	Kris Statlander and Hikaru Shida vs. Nyla Rose and Marina Shafir
114	October 13, 2023	Independence, Missouri	Cable Dahmer Arena	Blackpool Combat Club (Claudio Castagnoli and Wheeler Yuta) vs. Gates of Agony (Kaun and Toa Liona)
115	October 20, 2023	Rosenberg, Texas	Fort Bend Epicenter	Ruby Soho vs. Skye Blue
116	October 27, 2023	Philadelphia, Pennsylvania	Liacouras Center	Konosuke Takeshita vs. Kyle Fletcher
117	November 3, 2023	Louisville, Kentucky	KFC Yum! Center	Daniel Garcia vs. Trent Beretta
118	November 10, 2023	Oakland, California	Oakland Arena	FTR (Cash Wheeler and Dax Harwood) vs. El Hijo del Vikingo and Komander
119	November 17, 2023	Inglewood, California	Kia Forum	Roderick Strong vs. Action Andretti
120	November 25, 2023	Pittsburgh, Pennsylvania	Petersen Events Center	Katsuyori Shibata (c) vs. Wheeler Yuta for the ROH Pure Championship
121	December 1, 2023	Minneapolis, Minnesota	Target Center	Penta El Zero Miedo, Komander and El Hijo del Vikingo vs. Brian Cage and The WorkHorsemen (Anthony Henry and JD Drake)
122	December 8, 2023	Montreal, Quebec, Canada	Bell Centre	Bryan Danielson vs. Daniel Garcia in a AEW Continental Classic Blue League match
123	December 15, 2023 (Winter Is Coming)	Arlington, Texas	College Park Center	Penta El Zero Miedo, Komander and El Hijo del Vikingo vs. Action Andretti and Top Flight (Dante Martin and Darius Martin)
124	December 22, 2023 (Holiday Bash)	Oklahoma City, Oklahoma	Paycom Center	El Hijo del Vikingo (c) vs. Black Taurus for the AAA Mega Championship
125	December 29, 2023 (New Year's Smash)	Orlando, Florida	Addition Financial Arena	Rocky Romero, Trent Beretta and Orange Cassidy vs. Action Andretti and Top Flight (Dante Martin and Darius Martin)

=== 2024 ===
No.	Date	Location	Venue	Main event
126	January 5, 2024	Newark, New Jersey	Prudential Center	Wheeler Yuta (c) vs. Komander for the ROH Pure Championship
127	January 12, 2024 (Homecoming)	Jacksonville, Florida	Daily's Place	The Dark Order (Evil Uno, John Silver, and Alex Reynolds) vs. Jake's Crew (Jake Hager, Matt Menard, and Angelo Parker)
128	January 19, 2024	North Charleston, South Carolina	North Charleston Coliseum	Darby Allin vs. Jeff Hardy
129	January 26, 2024	Savannah, Georgia	Enmarket Arena	Kip Sabian vs. Komander vs. The Butcher vs. El Hijo del Vikingo
130	February 2, 2024	New Orleans, Louisiana	UNO Lakefront Arena	Místico, Volador Jr., Máscara Dorada, and Hechicero vs. Christopher Daniels, Matt Sydal, Matt Menard, and Angelo Parker
131	February 9, 2024	Phoenix, Arizona	Footprint Center	Kris Statlander and Willow Nightingale vs. The Outcasts (Saraya and Ruby Soho)
132	February 16, 2024	Cedar Park, Texas	H-E-B Center at Cedar Park	The Bang Bang Scissor Gang (Jay White, Colten Gunn, Austin Gunn, Max Caster, Anthony Bowens and Billy Gunn) vs. Jay Lethal, Jeff Jarrett, Satnam Singh and The Dark Order (Evil Uno, Alex Reynolds and John Silver)
133	February 23, 2024	Tulsa, Oklahoma	BOK Center	Roderick Strong vs. Jake Hager
134	March 1, 2024	Springfield, Missouri	Great Southern Bank Arena	Matt Sydal vs. Magnus
135	March 8, 2024	Duluth, Georgia	Gas South Arena	Top Flight (Darius Martin and Dante Martin) vs. Komander and Bryan Keith vs. Private Party ("Brother Zay" Isiah Kassidy and Marq Quen)
136	March 15, 2024	Boston, Massachusetts	TD Garden	The Undisputed Kingdom (Roderick Strong, Matt Taven and Mike Bennett) vs. Action Andretti and Top Flight (Dante Martin and Darius Martin)
137	March 20, 2024	Toronto, Ontario, Canada	Coca-Cola Coliseum	Kris Statlander and Willow Nightingale vs. Julia Hart and Skye Blue in a Street Fight
138	March 29, 2024	Quebec City, Quebec, Canada	Videotron Centre	Roderick Strong vs. Matt Menard in an AEW International Championship eliminator match
139	April 5, 2024	Worcester, Massachusetts	DCU Center	Daniel Garcia vs. Action Andretti vs. Bryan Keith vs. Komander in a four-way elimination match
140	April 12, 2024	Charleston, West Virginia	Charleston Coliseum & Convention Center	Jay White vs. Matt Sydal
141	April 20, 2024	Highland Heights, Kentucky	Truist Arena	The Undisputed Kingdom (Roderick Strong, Matt Taven and Mike Bennett) vs. Kyle O'Reilly, Rocky Romero and Matt Menard
142	April 27, 2024	Peoria, Illinois	Peoria Civic Center	Daniel Garcia and Katsuyori Shibata vs. Shane Taylor Promotions (Shane Taylor and Lee Moriarty)
143	May 1, 2024	Winnipeg, Manitoba, Canada	Canada Life Centre	Willow Nightingale (c) vs. Skye Blue in a Manitoba Massacre match for the AEW TBS Championship
144	May 11, 2024	Edmonton, Alberta, Canada	Rogers Place	Pac vs. Johnny TV
145	May 18, 2024	Portland, Oregon	Moda Center	Brian Cage vs. Anthony Bowens
146	May 24, 2024	Bakersfield, California	Mechanics Bank Arena	Kris Statlander and Willow Nightingale vs. Anna Jay and Alex Windsor
147	May 31, 2024	Inglewood, California	Kia Forum	Rey Fénix vs. "Brother Zay" Isiah Kassidy
148	June 7, 2024	Loveland, Colorado	Blue Arena	Mina Shirakawa vs. Serena Deeb
149	June 14, 2024	Des Moines, Iowa	Wells Fargo Arena	Pac vs. Jay Lethal
150	June 21, 2024	Allentown, Pennsylvania	PPL Center	Willow Nightingale vs. Serena Deeb in a Women's Owen Hart Cup Tournament Quarterfinal match
151	June 28, 2024	Buffalo, New York	KeyBank Center	Queen Aminata vs. Skye Blue
152	July 5, 2024 (Beach Break)	Chicago, Illinois	Wintrust Arena	Hikaru Shida vs. Mariah May in a Women's Owen Hart Cup Tournament Semifinal match
153	July 12, 2024	Southaven, Mississippi	Landers Center	Shane Taylor Promotions (Shane Taylor, Lee Moriarty and Anthony Ogogo) vs. Action Andretti and Top Flight (Dante Martin and Darius Martin)
154	July 19, 2024	North Little Rock, Arkansas	Simmons Bank Arena	The Lucha Brothers (Penta El Zero Miedo and Rey Fenix) vs. Private Party ("Brother Zay" Isiah Kassidy and Marq Quen)
155	July 26, 2024 (Royal Rampage)	Nashville, Tennessee	Bridgestone Arena	The Don Callis Family (Kyle Fletcher and Rush) vs. The Outrunners (Turbo Floyd and Truth Magnum), The Righteous (Vincent and Dutch) and Private Party ("Brother Zay" Isiah Kassidy and Marq Quen)
156	August 2, 2024	Greenville, South Carolina	Bon Secours Wellness Arena	MxM Collection (Mason Madden and Mansoor) vs. Private Party ("Brother Zay" Isiah Kassidy and Marq Quen)
157	August 9, 2024	Winston-Salem, North Carolina	Lawrence Joel Veterans Memorial Coliseum	Saraya vs. Nyla Rose
158	August 16, 2024	Norfolk, Virginia	Chartway Arena	Top Flight (Dante Martin and Darius Martin) vs. MxM Collection (Mason Madden and Mansoor)
159	August 23, 2024	Arlington, Texas	Esports Stadium Arlington	The Von Erichs (Marshall Von Erich and Ross Von Erich) vs. The Outrunners (Turbo Floyd and Truth Magnum)
160	August 30, 2024	Champaign, Illinois	State Farm Center	Konosuke Takeshita vs. Lio Rush vs. Komander vs. The Beast Mortos
161	September 6, 2024	Hoffman Estates, Illinois	Now Arena	House of Black (Brody King and Buddy Matthews) vs. MxM Collection (Mansoor and Mason Madden)
162	September 13, 2024	Lexington, Kentucky	Rupp Arena	Konosuke Takeshita vs. Action Andretti
163	September 20, 2024	Wilkes-Barre Township, Pennsylvania	Mohegan Sun Arena at Casey Plaza	Nick Wayne vs. Lio Rush vs. Kip Sabian vs. Rocky Romero
164	September 27, 2024	Springfield, Massachusetts	MassMutual Center	Willow Nightingale vs. Taya Valkyrie
165	October 4, 2024	Pittsburgh, Pennsylvania	Petersen Events Center	The Conglomeration (Kyle O'Reilly and Orange Cassidy) vs. The Learning Tree (Big Bill and Bryan Keith)
166	October 11, 2024	Spokane, Washington	Spokane Arena	Rocky Romero vs. Bryan Keith
167	October 18, 2024	San Jose, California	SAP Center	Private Party (Zay and Quen) vs. MxM Collection (Mansoor and Mason Madden)
168	October 25, 2024	West Valley City, Utah	Maverik Center	Ricochet vs. Nick Wayne
169	November 1, 2024	Cleveland, Ohio	Wolstein Center	Komander vs. Lio Rush
170	November 8, 2024	Manchester, New Hampshire	SNHU Arena	Lio Rush vs. Komander
171	November 15, 2024	Bridgeport, Connecticut	Total Mortgage Arena	Ricochet vs. Dante Martin
172	November 22, 2024	Reading, Pennsylvania	Santander Arena	The Conglomeration (Mark Briscoe, Rocky Romero and Tomohiro Ishii) vs. The Dark Order (Evil Uno, John Silver and Alex Reynolds)
173	November 30, 2024	Reading, Pennsylvania	Santander Arena	Hechicero vs. Komander
174	December 6, 2024	Fishers, Indiana	Fishers Event Center	Ricochet vs. Komander in a AEW Continental Classic Gold League match
175	December 13, 2024 (Winter Is Coming)	Kansas City, Missouri	T-Mobile Center	Powerhouse Hobbs and Mark Davis vs. The Don Callis Family (Konosuke Takeshita and Lance Archer)
176	December 20, 2024 (Holiday Bash)	Washington, D.C.	Entertainment & Sports Arena	Brody King vs. Komander in a AEW Continental Classic Gold League match
177	December 27, 2024 (New Year's Smash)	New York City, New York	Hammerstein Ballroom	Hook vs. Nick Wayne

== Broadcasting ==
In the United States, Rampage aired on Fridays on TNT at 10pm ET. The program was to move to TBS in January 2022, but in September, AEW announced that while Dynamite would move to TBS, Rampage would remain on TNT.

On September 25, 2019, AEW announced an international streaming deal with FITE TV primarily for regions outside of the United States and Canada via the "AEW Plus" package, which included live streaming and replay access of Dynamite in simulcast with its U.S. airing. This was expanded to include Rampage.

=== Canada ===
On August 9, 2021, PWInsider reported that TSN, which aired Dynamite in Canada, would stream Rampage online in simulcast with the U.S. through its website and TSN Direct service.

=== Europe ===
On July 3, 2021, WarnerTV Serie (known as TNT Serie until September 24, 2021) announced a deal to air Rampage on Monday nights in Germany.

On July 6, 2021, Toonami (another Warner channel) announced a deal to air Rampage in France.

On August 27, 2021, Sky Sport (owned by Comcast, which held rights to rival wrestling promotion WWE in the United States) and AEW announced that Rampage would air on Mondays nights in Italy.

On January 1, 2022, AEW announced that Rampage would be broadcast every Tuesday night on ITV4 with repeats every Thursday night on ITV1 in the United Kingdom. It was also available to view on their streaming service ITVX.

On February 10, 2022, Warner TV announced that they would air Rampage in Poland.

In Spain, AEW announced that Rampage would air on TNT starting on June 19, 2022.

=== Latin America ===
On October 22, 2020, AEW reached an agreement with the digital platform Pluto TV, broadcasting its repeat events (including past pay-per-views) with commentators in Spanish from Latin America. This would later include Rampage.

On October 1, 2021, Rampage began airing on Space, a WarnerMedia International channel in Brazil and on Space's Spanish feed, available throughout Latin America on Saturdays. On September 30, 2022, it was announced that AEW would stop airing on Space in Latin America on October 1, with Brazil following on December 30.

=== Africa ===
Rampage began airing on TNT Africa on October 2, 2021, in Sub-Saharan Africa. The show aired every Saturday morning at 10 AM CAT, one week after the U.S. broadcast.

=== Asia ===
In India, Rampage aired on Eurosport starting on August 15, 2021, and later at the same time as the American airing from August 21, 2021, every Saturday 7:30 AM IST. Eurosport was owned by Discovery Communications, which acquired WarnerMedia later in 2021 to become Warner Bros. Discovery. Rampage began airing on Premier Sports in the Philippines in October 2021 On April 8, 2022, it was announced that as part of the AEW and New Japan Pro-Wrestling (NJPW) working relationship that Rampage would air in Japan on NJPW World.

=== Oceania ===
Rampage aired on ESPN2 starting February 18, 2023, in Australia, New Zealand, Fiji, Samoa, Tonga, Cook Islands, Solomon Islands, Niue, Nauru, Vanuatu, Kiribati, Northern Marianas, Tokelau, Tahiti, Tuvalu, New Caledonia, American Samoa, Marshall Islands, Palau, Federated States of Micronesia, Papua New Guinea, Wallis, and Futuna.

== See also ==
- List of professional wrestling television series
