= Kingdom Pro Wrestling =

Bahraini professional wrestling promotion

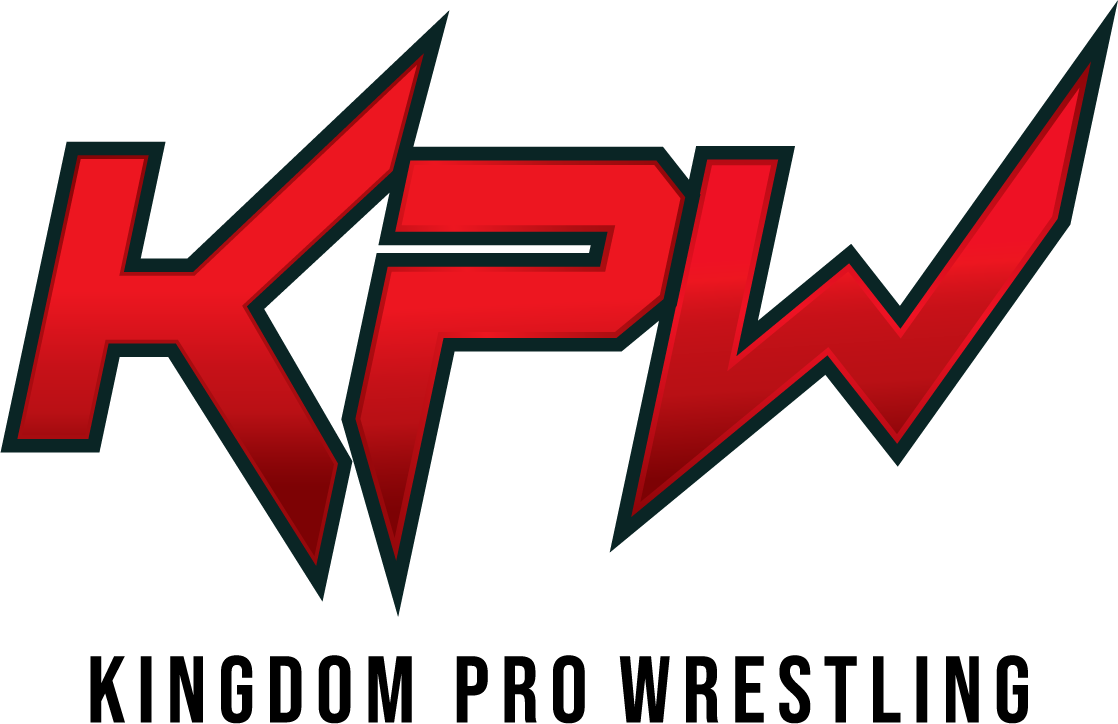
- Logo since November 2025
- Founded: 23 August 2022
- Style: Professional wrestling Sports entertainment
- Headquarters: Manama, Bahrain
- Website: kpwbh.com

Kingdom Pro Wrestling (KPW) is a Bahraini professional wrestling promotion founded on 23 August 2022.

== Training school ==
Kingdom Pro Wrestling hosts a professional wrestling school in Manama, Bahrain. It was founded in January 2019. Kingdom Pro Wrestling training school is an official facility that belongs to Kingdom Pro Wrestling promotion, which makes it the first wrestling promotion in the Middle East to have its own developmental school in which all the KPW roster were trained. The school currently has signed U.S veteran wrestler Glen Holbrook from The State of Georgia as Head Trainer. During his training career, Glen Holbrook has trained wrestlers like The Enfoncer, Chris Cruz, Kochi Takakura and Steve Lawler who trained Disco Inferno.

== History ==
=== Background and formation (2018–2020) ===
In December 2018, several social media users in Bahrain indicated the launch of Kingdom Pro Wrestling. However, KPW's first show was in February 2020 at ELMercado Arena.

=== COVID-19 pandemic (2020–2021) ===
As other sports cancellations and postponements were being announced by KPW in March 2020, KPW had canceled all events due to the pandemic and then announced the return of shows to fans in February 2022.

=== The Official start and the return to touring (2022–NOW) ===
- KPW logo until October 2025

As part of the company's new vision, new branding has been announced

In February 2022, KPW announced that they would be returning with four events in one year in three different towns, beginning with a special event on February 11, 2022 in Janabiya, Bahrain which has been called KPW Redemption in which Eight Man Tag Team Elimination Match took place, in turn becoming the first and only major professional wrestling promotion locally.

KPW then announced their new partnership with LuLu Group International to sponsor their events in Bahrain. Next event KPW Brawl In The Mall would be KPW's Manama debut, a town primarily known as the capital of Bahrain. Bahrain's popular hip-hop artist Flipperachi made an appearance to perform live rap music, as well as their other two events held after that. The first event was KPW SuperClash on May 20th, 2022 in which KPW Championship belt has been revealed and KPW Ramli Mall on November 11th, 2022 in Which Mixed Martial Artist Hamza Kooheji interfered during the main event to help The Great Zubari as he was beaten by Rudy Ruyal and the lumberjacks. Both events got a lot of buzz and took place in Lulu Group locations which at that time considered by the public as BaIn hrain's own wrestling locations.

In 2023, KPW held their most attended event at that time. Over 2,500 spectators in Hidd, Bahrain watched as Razor Jaw Shareef became the KPW Champion after beating The Great Zubari in the tournament final. The event featured most of roster including Ahmed Dragon, Ali Ninja, Alkaboos, Ismael The Living Dead, Jabbar, Khalid Kombat, Madrex, Mass Kid Man, Qassimovic, Razor Jaw Shareef, The Great Zubari and Yaqoob.

In 2024, KPW held three events. KPW WinterSlam, in which Razor Jaw Shareef retained the KPW championship in a Triple Threat Match against Jabbar and The Great Zubari. Another event was the first sold-out event KPW BattleZone and KPW Comiccon. At KPW Comiccon, ex-WWE Wrestlers Mansoor and Mason Madden MXM made an appearance in which they teamed up with Razor Jaw Shareef and wrestled in a six-man tag team match against Madrex, Tigre and the Great Zubari after they beat famous Bahraini comedic actor Hasan Makki.

In February 2025, KPW held KPW Comfest at Bahrain International Circuit where Aldababa made his KPW debut. This was followed by another event on February 28, 2025 at Galleria Mall Arena.

In May and June 2025, KPW held Four sold-out shows in Al-Riffa SC. The shows created a lot of buzz among Bahraini people and some wrestling fans in the GCC. KPW Texas Championship title has been revealed.

=== (NOV 2025 – NOW ) ===
In November 2025, KPW announced a new era in which they changed their previous simple logo for another one and teased new surprises and changes. They have appointed Mohamed Hamada as the new General Manager of the shows. From that point, the product took on a more storyline driven direction and high-spots and tables were also utilized.

In November 14, KPW Underground 5 was held in Riffa Club. Qassimovic debuted as a hardcore wrestler, the new Gerneral Manager Mohamed Hamada announced a Royal Rumble match and revealed the KPW Tag Team Championship belts. Aldababa has won the KPW title and the KPW Texas title after winning a seven-way match against Razor Jaw Shareef, Khalid Kombat, Khalil Kombat, Nerd #1, Nerd #2 and Yaqoob. Aldababa ended a 723-day championship reign of Razor Jaw Shareef.

A week later, on November 21, KPW Underground 6 was Held followed by KPW Underground 7 on November 28. The show featured multiple street fights between Qassimovic and MKM The Nightwolf and controversial ending of Ahmed Dragon and AlDababa match.

At Underground 8 on December 5, sport personality and anchor Hamad Alshamlan and actor Hasan Makki were involved in an angle against the Great Zubari and Mohamed Hamada in which he uses Tigre to defeat the Great Zubari.

In January 2026, KPW Announced Hidd Storm. The show took place at Hidd Club on the January 9 in which The Kombat Brothers become the first event KPW Tag Team Champions after defeating Tigre and MKM The NightWolf in the final of the tag team tournament. Mr. Mohamed Hamada announced the Royal Rumble match will take place next month with the participation of Shareef who made a comeback at this event after missing many shows.

A month later, KPW BahrainMania (Bahrain's Royal Rumble( took place at Dana Mall events arena in Manama. One of the biggest surprises of the night was the participation of Bahrain Finest YouTuber Omar Farooq, along with Actor Hasan Maki, Sport Anchor and commentator Hamad Alshamlan and Actor Mohamed Jahrami. The event considered the Biggest event KPW has ever Had since its start. Razor Jaw Shareef won the dramatic royal rumble match to get a title shot for the KPW Championship.

== Events ==
Event	Date	Venue	Location	Main event
KPW Mercado	February 17, 2020	El Mercado Mall Arena	Janabiya	Jabbar vs. Rudy Ruyal
KPW Redemption	February 11, 2022	El Mercado Mall Arena	Janabiya	Eight Man Tag Team Elimination Match
KPW Brawl In The Mall	March 25, 2022	Dana Mall Arena	Manama	The Great Zubari vs. Razor Jaw Shareef
KPW SuperClash	May 20, 2022	Dana Mall Arena	Manama	Hamad The Lion vs. VCT in a Chain Match
KPW Ramli Battle	November 4, 2022	Ramli Mall Arena	A,ali	The Great Zubari vs. Rudy Ruyal in a No Escape Match
KPW Road To The Gold	November 22, 2023	LuluHyper Market Arena	Hidd	Razor Jaw Shareef vs. The Great Zubari for the KPW Championship title.
KPW WinterSlam	January 12, 2024	Galleria Mall Arena	Zinj	Razor Jaw Shareef (c) vs. Jabbar vs. The Great Zubari is a Triple Threat Match.
KPW BattleZone	April 12, 2024	Galleria Mall Arena	Zinj	Khalid Kombat vs. MKM The NightWolf in a Mask On A Pole Match
KPW Comiccon 1	April 27, 2024	Bahrain International Circuit	Zallaq	The Great Zubari & Madrex & Tigre w/ Hasan Maki vs. Mansoor & Masson Madden & Razor Jaw Shareef w/ Glen Holbrook in a 6 Men Tag Team Match
KPW Comfest	February 1, 2025	Bahrain International Circuit	Zallaq	Razor Jaw Shareef (c) vs. MKM The NightWolf for the KPW Championship tile.
KPW WinterClash	February 28, 2025	Galleria Mall Arena	Zinj	Razor Jaw Shareef (c) vs. MKM The NightWolf for the KPW Championship tile.
KPW ComicCon 2	May 3, 2025	Bahrain International Circuit	Zallaq	Razor Jaw Shareef (c) vs. MKM The NightWolf vs. Ismaeel The Living Dead vs. Qassimovic for the KPW Texas Championship tile.
KPW Underground 1	May 23, 2025	Riffa Sport Club	Riffa	Razor Jaw Shareef (c) vs. Hasan Maki for the KPW Championship Title.
KPW Underground 2	May 30, 2025	Riffa Sport Club	Riffa	Razor Jaw Shareef (c) vs. Aldababa for the KPW Texas Championship tile.
KPW Underground 3	June 13, 2025	Riffa Sport Club	Riffa	Razor Jaw Shareef (c) vs. Aldababa for the KPW Texas Championship tile.
KPW Underground 4	June 20, 2025	Riffa Sport Club	Riffa	Razor Jaw Shareef (c) vs. Aldababa (c) in a Title vs. Title Match for the KPW Texas Championship tile & The KPW Championship Title.
KPW Underground 5	November 11, 2025	Riffa Sport Club	Riffa	Aldababa won KPW championship title and KPW Texas championship title.
KPW Underground 6	November 21, 2025	Riffa Sport Club	Riffa	Aldababa (c) vs. The Great Zubari for the KPW Championship tile.
KPW Underground 7	November 28, 2025	Riffa Sport Club	Riffa	Aldababa (c) vs. Ahmed Dragon for The KPW Championship Title.
KPW Underground 8	December 5, 2025	Riffa Sport Club	Riffa	Aldababa (c) vs. Madrex for The KPW Championship Title and KPW Texas Championship title.
KPW Hidd Storm	January 9, 2026	Hidd Sport Club	Hidd	The Kombat Brothers vs. Tigre and MKM The NightWolf for The KPW Tag Team Championship Title.
KPW BahrainMania ( Bahrain Royal Rumble )	February 7, 2026	Dana Mall Arena	Manama	30 Men Royal Rumble Match

== Roster ==
=== Wrestlers ===
- Ahmed Dragon
- Aldababa – Current KPW champion and KPW Texas champion
- Fernando
- Hamad The Lion
- Ismaeel The Living Dead
- Jabbar
- Khalid Kombat - One half of KPW Tag Team champions
- Khalil Kombat - One half of KPW Tag Team champions
- Madrex
- MKM The Night Wolf
- Nerd #1
- Nerd #2
- Qassimovic
- Razor Jaw Shareef
- Rudy Ruyal
- Shankool
- The Great Zubari
- Tigre
- VCT
- Yaqoob
- Zameel Bhia

=== Managers ===
- Glen Holbrook
- Mr. Khorshid
- Mr. Mohamed Hamada

=== Visiting International Wrestlers ===
- Mansoor *appeared in 2024
- Masson Madden *appeared in 2024

== Champions ==
=== KPW Championship Title ===
The KPW Championship is the main championship in the Kingdom Pro Wrestling promotion. The current champion is Aldababa, who is in his first reign.

=== Reigns ===
Key
No.	Overall reign number
Reign	Reign number for the specific champion
Days	Number of days held

No.	Champion	Championship change			Reign statistics		Notes	Ref.
No.	Champion	Date	Event	Location	Reign	Days	Notes	Ref.
1	The Great Zubari	November 22, 2023	Road To The Gold	Hidd, Bahrain	1	0	The Great Zubari defeated Madrex in the tournament final to become the first ever KPW champion in history but lost it after 4 minutes.	
2	Razor Jaw Shareef	November 22, 2023	Road To The Gold	Hidd, Bahrainl	1	723	Razor Jaw Shareef asked for his title shot and won the KPW championship by pinning The Great Zubari.	
3	Aldababa	November 14, 2025	KPW Underground 5	Riffa, Bahrainl	1	367+	Aldababa wins the KPW championship title to end Razor Jaw Shareef's 723 days title reign.	

=== KPW Texas Championship Title ===
The KPW Texas Championship is a championship introduced by KPW Head Trainer Glen Holbrook. The current champion is Aldababa, who is in his Second reign.

=== Reigns ===
Key
No.	Overall reign number
Reign	Reign number for the specific champion
Days	Number of days held

No.	Champion	Championship change			Reign statistics		Notes	Ref.
No.	Champion	Date	Event	Location	Reign	Days	Notes	Ref.
1	Razor Jaw Shareef	May 3, 2025	ComicCon 2	Zallaq, Bahrain	1	41	Razor Jaw Shareef won a four-man Gauntlet Match to become the first ever KPW Texas champion in history.	
2	Aldababa	June 13, 2025	Underground 3	Riffa, Bahrain	1	7	Aldababa won the championship by pinfall.	
3	Razor Jaw Shareef	June 20, 2025	Underground 4	Riffa, Bahrain	2	147	Razor Jaw Shareef won the title for the 2nd time in a Ladder Match.	
4	Aldababa	November 14, 2025	Underground 5	Riffa, Bahrain	2	367+	Aldababa won The 7 Men Battle Royal Match to win the title.	

=== KPW Tag Team Championship Title ===
The KPW Tag Team Championship is the main championship in the Kingdom Pro Wrestling promotion for the Tag Team Competitions. The current champion Are Khalid Kombat & Khalil Kombat ( The Kombat Brothers ), who are the first ever KPW Tag Team Champions in History and they are in their first reign.

=== Reigns ===
Key
No.	Overall reign number
Reign	Reign number for the specific champion
Days	Number of days held

No.	Champion	Championship change			Reign statistics		Notes	Ref.
No.	Champion	Date	Event	Location	Reign	Days	Notes	Ref.
1	The Kombat Brothers	January 9, 2026	Hidd Storm	Hidd, Bahrain	1	311+	The Kombat Brothers defeated Tigre and MKM The NightWolf in the tournament final to become the first ever KPW Tag Team champions in history.	
