= Brent Williams (American football) =

American football player (born 1964)

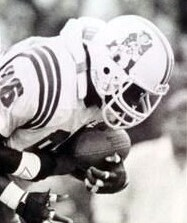
- Williams playing for the Patriots circa 1988

No. 96, 93, 91
- Position: Defensive end

Personal information
- Born: October 23, 1964 (age 62); Flint, Michigan, U.S.
- Listed height: 6 ft 4 in (1.93 m)
- Listed weight: 283 lb (128 kg)

Career information
- High school: Flint Northern (Flint, Michigan)
- College: Toledo
- NFL draft: 1986: 7th round, 192nd overall pick

Career history
- New England Patriots (1986–1993); Seattle Seahawks (1994–1995); New York Jets (1996)

Awards and highlights
- 2x First-team All-MAC (1984, 1985); New England Patriots All-1990s Team; PFWA All-Rookie Team (1986)

Career NFL statistics
- Tackles: 491
- Sacks: 45.5
- Fumble recoveries: 12
- Stats at Pro Football Reference

Brent Dione Williams (born October 23, 1964) is an American former professional football player who was a defensive end for 11 seasons in the National Football League (NFL). He played college football for the Toledo Rockets. His son is former NFL offensive tackle and current AEW professional wrestler Brennan Williams.

== Career ==
Williams attended the University of Toledo from 1982 to 1985, where he played college football for the Toledo Rockets. In his last two seasons he was elected to the First-team All-MAC. In 2016 he was inducted into the Varsity 'T' Hall of Fame, the hall of fame of the Toledo Rockets, for his achievements.

In the 1986 NFL draft, Williams was selected in the seventh round by the New England Patriots. In his first six seasons, he started every game for five seasons. The only exception was the 1987 season, which was plagued by a players' strike. He played a total of eight seasons with the Patriots. During this time he achieved 43.5 sacks, which in 1993 was the second most and currently the sixth most in the history of the franchise after Andre Tippett's 100. He was elected to the 1990s All-Decade Team for his achievements with the Patriots. In 1994 he joined the Seattle Seahawks, but became a free agent after the 1995 season. In 1996 he played his final season for the New York Jets.
