= Revolutionary Championship Wrestling =

Professional wrestling promotion

- Acronym: RCW
- Founded: 2002
- Style: American Wrestling
- Headquarters: Portsmouth, Ohio, United States (2002-current)
- Founder: Dirk Cunningham
- Owner(s): Dirk Cunningham (2002-current); The Phoenix (On screen character)
- Website: RCWonline.com

Revolutionary Championship Wrestling is a Midwestern independent professional wrestling promotion based in Portsmouth, Ohio.

== History ==
RCW was formed in early 2002 by Dirk Cunningham who had left the Superstar Wrestling Federation (SWF) after creative differences with Owner Andy Runyon. Soon afterwards several other wrestling stars left the SWF as well due to creative differences.

In mid-2002 Cunningham acquired a ring, promoters license and formed a booking committee featuring himself, Jerry Davis, Jason Taylor, V.L. Stricklett, Ace Gigolo, Jay Vastine, Chris Smith and Exotic E. The first show was booked for West Union, Ohio on November 29, 2002 and was titled "RCW: The Gathering". Notable appearances included surprise appearances by SWF stars "The King" Randy Allen, "The Notorious" Jay Vastine, "Livewire" Chris Smith and Total Nonstop Action Wrestling tag team champion "Wildcat" Chris Harris.

After 2 events, Cunningham disbanded the committee and set forth on running the promotion himself. By 2013, RCW is still going strong with Cunningham at the helm.

An ongoing storyline thru 2012 was the mysterious Owner of RCW, "The Phoenix". At the 7 Year Anniversary Show it was discovered that Al Snow was the Owner of RCW, and the man behind the mask. In 2012 at RCW 100, Al Snow's ownership was sold to another mysterious owner. In December 2012, at RCW's 10th Anniversary Event, Dirk Extreme (Cunningham) announced that he was the true owner of RCW. It was also announced that night that Trik Nasty would be the acting owner for 1 year until Extreme retired from active wrestling to not cause a conflict.

RCW has produced over 100 TV episodes. First, a half-hour TV program on the Local WB/CW affiliate (WHCP) that saw 72 original episodes. RCW then produced a TV Show entitled RCW: Wrestling Shadows which broadcast over-the-air on TV station WTZP The Zone, channel 59 in Chillicothe, Ohio and channel 66 in Portsmouth, Ohio. Shadows still replays on the Zone periodically. RCW is currently at work on an all new show for the area that is due out sometime in 2013.

In January 2013, RCW was affiliated with the movie "Pro Wrestlers vs Zombies" starring Roddy Piper, Jim Duggan, Matt Hardy and others. The RCW Ring is visible in several scenes during the movie. RCW Talent Dirk Cunningham (Extreme), Tyson Rogers and Randy Allen also appear in the film as Zombies. RCW Cameraman Chris Jones was also used on the film behind the camera.

RCW has an extensive Film Crew that video and edit footage for several companies such as Remix Pro Wrestling, ASW Wrestling, IWA East Coast Wrestling, UVC MMA, Tammy Jo's Dance Studio and Stacey's Dance Studio. Dirk Cunningham with cousin Chris Jones primarily make up the staff.

== RCW Roster ==
RCW Champions

Championship	Current champion(s)	Date won	Event	Previous champion(s)
RCW Championship	Jason Legend	November 23rd, 2024	Full Circle XXII	Dirk Extreme
RCW North American Championship	Rey Tormenta Jr	November 14th, 2026	Full Circle XXIV	Randy Allen
RCW Tag-Team Champions	Onyx and Maxx Power	November 14th, 2026	Full Circle XXIV	Dirk Extreme and Simon

RCW Wrestlers

- "Astonishing" Aaron Williams
- Black Smoke
- "Natural" Chad Cruise
- "Captivating" Corey Mason
- Cyrus Poe
- "Dangerous" Damien Kass
- "Re-Enforcer" Devlin Anderson
- "American Idol" Dirk Extreme
- Eclipso
- El Nino
- "The Angel Of Old School" Evelyn Sage
- Flash Fury
- Heavy Metal
- Jack Doe
- Jason "The Gift" Kincaid
- Jason Legend
- Jimmy "Pretty Boy" Malloy
- "Genuine" Jock Samson
- Judas Thorn
- "Bad News" Keith Hamblin
- "The Villainess" Liberty L.
- Mastermind
- "Reaper" Matt Conard
- "Loony" Mike Horton
- Onyx
- The Cobra
- Randy "The King" Allen
- Rase Banon
- Rey Tormenta JR.
- Sara Stricklett
- "The Las Vegas Playboy" Simon Rothchild
- Tank Runyon
- Theo Strong
- Tommy Chill
- Trik Nasty
- Tyson Rogers
- "Violent" Vance Desmond
- "Supernatural" Zac Vincent
- Zaiden Kayne

== RCW Past Wrestlers & Managers ==
- Adam Hileman
- Al B. Damm
- "Awesome" Aaron Andrews
- Ace Gigolo
- "Attitude" Andy Runyon
- Angel
- Average White Guy
- B.J. Cantrell
- Beautiful Bobby L.
- Billy McCarty
- Bryan Fury
- C.O. Hustler
- Capt. Kevin Johnson
- "Too Bad" Chad Allegra
- "Livewire" Chris Smith
- Dude Rock
- Dregen
- Exotic E
- Fyre
- The Great Meco
- The Informer
- Ivanna B. Eighton
- J.D. Santos
- "Too Fine" Jason Taylor
- Jay Donaldson
- "Heartbreaker" Jay Vastine
- Heidi Loveless/Ruby Riott
- Jeremy Maddrox
- Josh Hayes
- Juggulator
- Mace Parker
- Maxx Power
- "Mean" Mark Manson
- Meltdown
- Nick Wrath
- Nikki Tyler
- "Precious" Paul Harley
- Peaches
- Pele
- Sancho
- "All American" Shawn Parks
- "Too Sexy" Sean Casey
- Shigroth
- Sin-D
- Suicide Kyd
- Syren
- Victor Stone
- Vile
- "The Giant Killer" Tiny Tim
- Zodiac

== RCW Factions ==
- Army of Darkness
- The Coven
- Excalibur
- Weapons of Mass Destruction
- I.O.U
- Loony's Asylum
- Wrestle Ohio

== RCW Title History ==
RCW Championship

#	Wrestler	Reign	Date Won	Event	Defeated
1	Dregen	1	2/08/03	Hail to the King	Vile
-	Vacant	-	6/16/03	N/A	Dregen
2	Vile	1	7/03/03	Independence Blast	Sean Casey
-	Vacant	-	10/18/03	N/A	Vile
3	"Beautiful" Bobby L.	1	10/18/03	Nightmare on Elm Street	Maxx Power
4	Maxx Power	1	12/13/03	Full Circle	"Beautiful" Bobby L.
5	Trik Nasty	1	10/16/04	Uncivil War	Randy "The King" Allen
6	"Attitude" Andy Runyon	1	12/11/04	Full Circle II	Trik Nasty
7	Dirk Extreme	1	6/18/05	RCW TV Taping	Trik Nasty
-	Vacant	-	10/15/05	Uncivil War	Dirk Extreme
8	Randy "The King" Allen	1	12/3/05	Full Circle III	Judas Thorn
9	Judas Thorn	1	2/18/06	Ashland Assault	Randy "The King" Allen
10	Tank Runyon	1	2/3/07	Sheer Impact	Judas Thorn
11	Trik Nasty	2	6/30/07	Injection 5	Tank Runyon
12	Tank Runyon	2	12/1/07	Full Circle V	Trik Nasty
13	Onyx	1	8/23/08	Voracity	Tank Runyon
14	Tank Runyon	3	11/01/08	Uncivil War	Onyx
15	"American Idol" Dirk Extreme	2	12/06/08	Full Circle VI	Tank Runyon
16	Flash Fury	1	08/29/09	RCW 75	"American Idol" Dirk Extreme
17	"Violent" Vance Desmond	1	12/05/09	Full Circle VII	Flash Fury
18	Judas Thorn	2	05/01/10	Road To Injection	"Violent" Vance Desmond
19	Juggulator	1	02/05/11	Invitational Tagteam Cup	Judas Thorn
20	"Violent" Vance Desmond	2	09/17/11	Out of Control	Juggulator
21	"Natural" Chad Cruise	1	12/03/11	Full Circle IX	"Genuine" Jock Samson
22	Judas Thorn	3	12/01/12	Full Circle X	"Natural" Chad Cruise
23	Dangerous Damien Kass	1	07/27/13	Impoundment	Judas Thorn
24	Tyson Rogers	1	07/27/13	Impoundment	Dangerous Damien Kass
25	"The Black Superman" Onyx	2	01/09/15	Full Circle XII	Tyson Rogers
26	Dangerous Damien Kass	2	11/14/15	Uncivil War 2015	"The Black Superman" Onyx
27	Tommy Chill	1	05/07/16	Spring Loaded 2016	Dangerous Damien Kass
27	Trik Nasty	3	01/13/17	Full Circle XIV Day 1	Tommy Chill
28	Tommy Chill	2	01/14/17	Full Circle XIV Day 2	Trik Nasty
29	Trik Nasty	4	01/14/17	Full Circle XIV Day 2	Tommy Chill
30	Tank Runyon	4	12/09/17		Dirk Extreme (Substitute for Trik Nasty)
31	"The Black Superman" Onyx	3	03/09/18	Full Circle XV	Tank Runyon

== RCW Staff ==
- Chris Jones - RCW Videographer
- Dirk Cunningham - RCW Owner
- Dustie King - RCW Audio Engineer
- Eric Schomburg - RCW Photographer
- John Reuben - RCW Senior Referee
- "WWWorld Famous" Kenny Young - RCW Ring Announcer
- Mastermind - RCW Commissioner
- RangerBob - RCW Play-By-Play Commentator
- Steve Helphenstine - RCW Referee
- Trik Nasty - RCW Acting Owner

== Superstars that have appeared ==
- Barbarian
- Big Van Vader
- Demolition Ax
- "Beautiful" Bobby Eaton
- Eugene
- Zach Gowen
- "Wildcat" Chris Harris
- Honky Tonk Man
- "The Russian Bear" Ivan Koloff
- "Russian Nightmare" Nikita Koloff
- Jerry "The King" Lawler
- Mad Man Pondo
- Ricky Morton
- Al Snow
- "Dr. Death" Steve Williams

== See also ==
- List of independent wrestling promotions in the United States
