= Soft Ground Wrestling =

Ugandan wrestling promotion and school

- Acronym: SGW
- Founded: 2023
- Style: Professional wrestling, with aspects of mud wrestling
- Headquarters: Mukono District
- Founder: Daniel Bumba
- Website: Official website

Soft Ground Wrestling (Ekigwo kya Bumbash, abbreviated SGW) is an Ugandan independent professional wrestling promotion and wrestling school. Based in Mukono–Kirangira, Mukono District, SGW was founded on March 16, 2023, by local resident Daniel Bumba, a quantity surveyor turned television presenter. As of March 2024, the school trains over 180 students. The promotion is noted for their rudimentary production setup that consists of a wrestling ring made from mud, surrounded by nylon ropes held together by bamboo posts.

The promotion gained international attention when All Elite Wrestling's Will Ospreay and Total Nonstop Action Wrestling's Jordynne Grace made donations to a GoFundMe fundraiser aimed at providing it a standard wrestling ring as well as additional operating funds.

== History ==
Soft Ground Wrestling was founded on March 16, 2023, by Daniel Bumba. The company began wrestling in an informal ring, composed of nylon ropes, bamboo ring posts, and a bare ground, which gave the promotion its name. The company began posting clips of their matches and promos online, which began to gain attention on social media.

Beginning in February 2024, SGW ran several crowdfunding campaigns to buy materials needed to maintain their wrestling promotion. This included a wrestling ring and supplies. They also promised that money raised would be spent on legally renting the land used for SGW events. These crowdfunding campaigns garnered significant attention. The original goal was $10,000, but between the different crowdfunding campaigns, as well as other donations, the promotion ended up raising over $40,000. Many wrestlers donated money, including Will Ospreay and Jordynne Grace.

Later, a livestream was held to raise money for the promotion. This livestream attracted a lot of attention and brought in many guests, including Mason and Mansoor of MxM Collection, Mojo Rawley, Evil Uno, Mustafa Ali, Dijak, Joe Hendry, and Nikki Cross. This livestream, meant to raise money for a van as well as additional supplies. In total, the livestream raised nearly $30,000. In addition, Mansoor's mother donated the full amount of money needed for a van.

After this, the promotion began to see wrestlers visit from overseas. In April 2024, Cima and other performers from Japanese professional wrestling and mixed martial arts promotion Gleat appeared for SGW. That same month, MxM Collection appeared in the promotion. In May 2024, Tate Mayfairs joined SGW. He later competed in a tournament in the promotion to crown their first SGW Champion.

In May 2024, there was an incident at a SGW show where multiple wrestlers for the promotion, including Bumba, were arrested for malicious property damage. SGW claimed that the land they were on was legally theirs, having bought it, but later, Bumba claimed to have been duped by a fake broker. Bumba claimed later to have bribed the police to let the wrestlers go and to have the incident wiped off their records.

In April 2025, British YouTuber and social media influencer Joe Weller participated in SGW's Mud Mania event, defeating One Man Army in a match held in a wrestling ring made from mud. Post-match, Joe announced that he would be donating money that will go toward providing medical services for SGW future events, such as paying for ambulances and medical staff.

== Controversies ==
=== Mishandling of money ===
Despite the money raised for SGW to buy themselves a ring, controversy arose when they continued to wrestle on their ground ring like before. Daniel Bumba had appointed an American teenager to look over the crowdfunding campaigns and get the money to SGW in Uganda. However, the teenager had trouble with this, leading to accusations that they had stolen the money. This led to harassment on social media of the teenager. Bumba admitted in private, however, that he had acted abusively towards the teenager.

While the money was later transferred to SGW, transfer fees and bank fees consumed most of the money, meaning that SGW was unable to buy themselves a ring at the time. This led to subsequent crowdfunding campaigns. Following this controversy, on June 11, 2024, WWE's Cody Rhodes announced he would cover the cost to have an official ring constructed for the promotion. Rather than donate money for SGW to use, he bought the ring directly, allowing them to circumvent the issues around transferring money that they had run into before. In February 2025, SGW began holding matches in their official ring.

Further controversy arose around the van that SGW had raised money for. According to Cassidy Haynes' investigation, multiple vans were bought with the money, while Bumba continued to insist that he had only bought one. The quality of the vans was also in doubt, as they were meant to transport SGW wrestlers, but lacked back seats.

There have also been disputes around how SGW handles the money they raise from shows and merchandise. Despite selling shirts with wrestlers' likeness on them, it was unclear if the wrestlers were getting the money from sales, or if the money was being withheld under the promise of being paid out at a later date.

=== Orphanage status ===
While SGW promotes itself as an orphanage and a place for youths to find options for themselves, others have disputed this. SGW is not registered as an orphanage or wrestling school in Uganda, meaning its operations would be unofficial. They have also run into legal issues due to their unofficial status and using land which they do not own or rent, which has put into question the safety of the youths they are training.

SGW charges wrestlers 40 USD to train at their school, which is equivalent to 150,000 UGX. This is far above the Ugandan average monthly wage. This has raised questions about SGW's intentions and whether the promise of supporting orphans that they claim to do. SGW also charged their students for basic necessities, such as toilet paper, electricity, and rent.

=== Risk of injury ===
Many outlets called attention to the unsafe conditions of SGW. Despite advertising themselves as a place for underprivileged youths to gain opportunities for the future, SGW lacked safety standards. While no wrestlers or students were ever seriously injured, several were hurt in minor ways, such as sprained body parts.
