= Mansoor (wrestler) =

Saudi professional wrestler (born 1995)

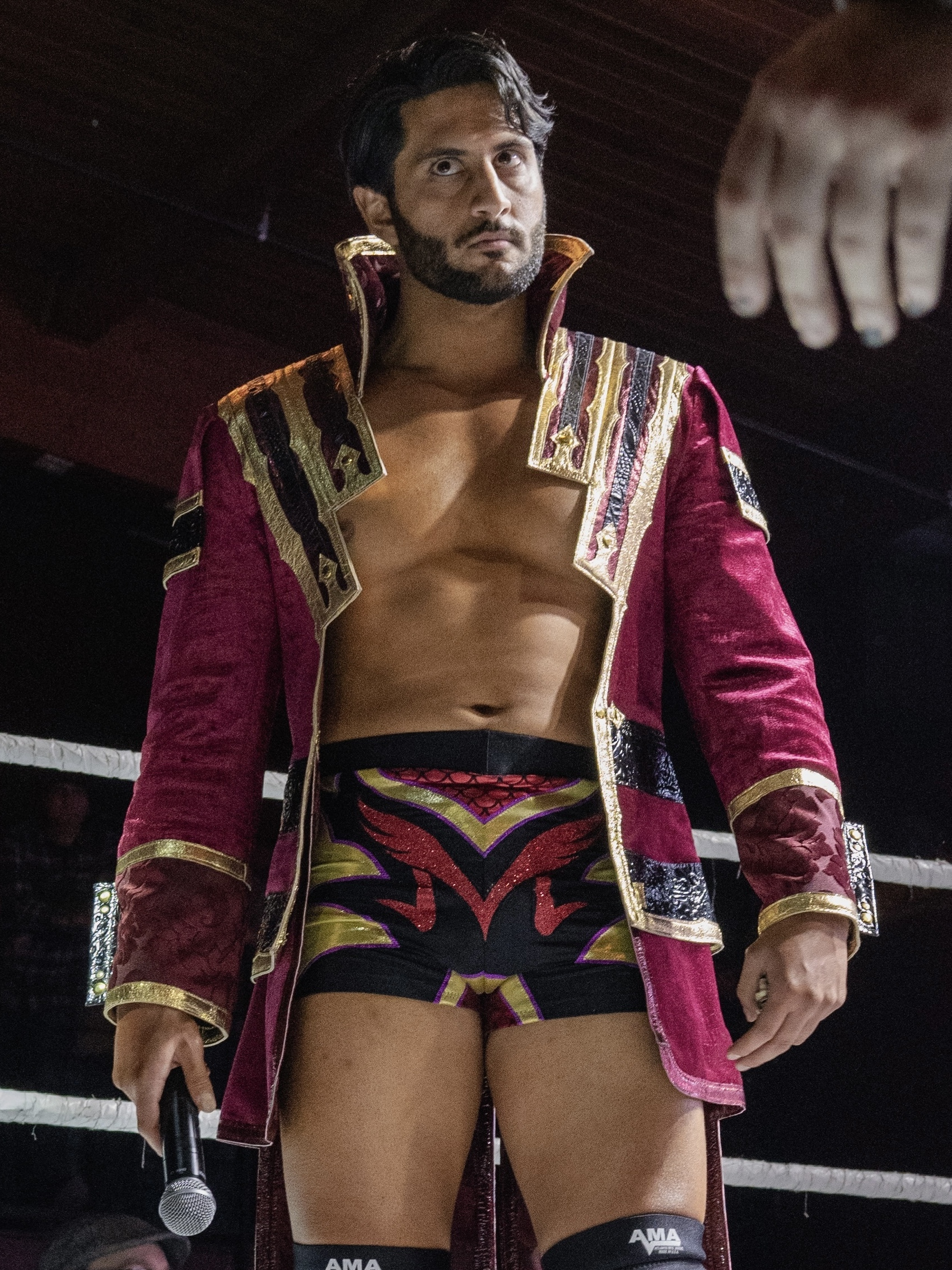
- Mansoor in 2024

Personal information
- Born: Mansoor Abdul Aziz Mohamed Abdul Aziz Al-Shehail; October 28, 1995 (age 31) Riyadh, Saudi Arabia

Professional wrestling career
- Ring name(s): Mansoor mån.sôör Mansoor Al-Shehail; Manny Faberino; Big Money Manny
- Billed height: 6 ft 0 in (183 cm)
- Billed weight: 216 lb (98 kg)
- Billed from: Riyadh, Saudi Arabia
- Trained by: Dory Funk Jr. Stoner U Academy; WWE Performance Center
- Debut: January 15, 2015

Mansoor Abdul Aziz Mohamed Abdul Aziz Al-Shehail (Note: Arabic: منصور عبد العزيز محمد عبد العزيز الشهيل) (born 28 October 1995), known mononymously as Mansoor, is a Saudi-American professional wrestler, internet personality, and livestreamer. He is signed to All Elite Wrestling (AEW), where he is one-half of MxM Collection with Mason Madden as members of MxM TV. He also wrestles for AEW's sister promotion Ring of Honor (ROH) and on the independent circuit―notably for Pro Wrestling Rebellion (PWR), where he is an in-ring talent, a writer, and producer. He is also known for his tenure in WWE, where he is the first Saudi wrestler to have competed in the promotion.

== Early life ==
Mansoor Al-Shehail was born in Riyadh, Saudi Arabia, on October 28, 1995 to an American mother and a Saudi father. At the age of 11, he moved to the United States where he grew up in California. Al-Shehail was a fan of professional wrestling from a young age, and was surrounded by friends whom he shared this passion with, often by playing wrestling video games.

Al-Shehail struggled with his mixed Saudi-American heritage as a child, saying "My mother is American, but there were times growing up that I was treated like I was too Saudi to be American, but also too American to be Saudi. Identity-wise, it's something that I've always had to juggle with, but in terms of wrestling it was a huge advantage as they have wrestling schools all across the US so I was able to learn from a young age."

== Professional wrestling career ==
=== Early career (2015–2018) ===
Mansoor Al-Shehail was initially trained by the Stoner U Academy and Dory Funk Jr. In his early career, he worked under the names Manny Faberino and Big Money Manny on the independent circuit for various promotions including Hoodslam, All Pro Wrestling, Stoner Brothers University, Best of the West Wrestling, and Gold Rush Pro Wrestling. During this period, he won East Bay Pro Wrestling's main championship once, which he vacated upon signing with WWE.

=== WWE (2018–2023) ===
==== Early beginnings (2018–2022) ====
Al-Shehail was one of eight participants WWE scouted during a tryout in Jeddah, Saudi Arabia, ahead of 2018's Greatest Royal Rumble, WWE's first major event in Saudi Arabia, and was offered additional training at the WWE Performance Center in Orlando, Florida. He was featured in a segment during the event, where he and his fellow recruits partook in a physical altercation with Shawn Daivari and Ariya Daivari. Al-Shehail, under his "Manny Faberino" ring name, made his WWE debut at an NXT live event on September 6, 2018, losing to Luke Menzies. He made his television debut on the February 6, 2019 episode of NXT as a face, and going by the ring name Mansoor, where he was defeated by Jaxson Ryker. Al-Shehail also provided the voice of Cole Quinn, one of the main characters in WWE 2K19's MyCareer mode, which he would reprise in WWE 2K20 the following year.

He appeared on WWE events on Saudi Arabia, like winning a 51-man Battle Royal at Super ShowDown, defeating Cesaro at Crown Jewel, and Dolph Ziggler at Super ShowDown. Following this, Mansoor became a regular on 205 Live and Main Event, developing a winning streak.

On the 3 May episode of Raw, Mansoor was assigned to the Raw brand, and made his in-ring debut the same night, losing to United States Champion Sheamus by disqualification due to interference from Humberto Carrillo, and ending his winning streak. According to Mansoor, his winning streak was a "creative order" and he felt frustrated. In June, Mansoor began a storyline with Mustafa Ali, who tried to convince him that the rest of WWE superstars were "backstabbers", "would do anything just to get ahead", and "cheaters", leading to a match on the 5 July episode of Raw, where Mansoor suffered his first pinfall loss.

As part of the 2021 Draft, Mansoor was drafted to the SmackDown brand. On the October 11 episode of Raw, Mansoor was attacked by Ali in the backstage after they lost to The Hurt Business, ending the alliance between the two; Ali would challenge him to a match at Crown Jewel later that night. At the event, Mansoor defeated Ali. This was Mansoor's last appearance in Saudi Arabia, since Vince McMahon told him that the Saudi Arabian government didn't want him competing in the country anymore.

==== Maximum Male Models (2022–2023) ====
On April 22, 2022, in a dark segment on SmackDown, Mansoor turned heel for the first time in his career when he was announced as the newest member of LA Knight's stable, Knight Model Management alongside Mace. On the July 1 episode of SmackDown, Knight, now known as Max Dupri, announced Mace and Mansoor, under the tweaked names ma.çé and mån.sôör, as his new tag team, Maximum Male Models. Maximum Male Models later welcomed Maxxine Dupri, Max's (kayfabe) sister, to manage the team. Maximum Male Models joined the Raw brand on February 6, 2023, and remained on Raw following the 2023 Draft. After weeks of spending time with Otis of the Alpha Academy, Maxxine left Maximum Male Models to join Alpha Academy on the May 15 episode of Raw when she cheered on Otis and Chad Gable eliminating ma.çé and mån.sôör in the Intercontinental Championship number one contenders' battle royal match. After months of inactivity, ma.çé and mån.sôör were both released from their WWE contracts on September 21.

=== Independent circuit (2023–present) ===
Al-Shehail, reverting to his previous ring name Mansoor, made a surprise appearance at Deadlock Pro-Wrestling (DPW) 2nd Anniversary taping on December 10, 2023, as part of the tag team MxM alongside Mason Madden (formerly Mace). DPW announced that MxM would make their debut at DPW Live 4 on January 20, 2024. On December 11, 2023, Game Changer Wrestling (GCW) announced that Mansoor would make his debut at Look At Me on January 26, 2024. On April 13, MxM appeared for the Ugandan-based Soft Ground Wrestling (SGW) promotion, with their appearance helping give the rising promotion further notoriety, with many other wrestlers from promotions such as AEW and TNA showing their support for both the team and the promotion itself. On April 27, MxM appeared in the Middle East for Kingdom Pro Wrestling (KPW) promotion, in a show called KPW ComicCon.

=== All Elite Wrestling / Ring of Honor (2024–present) ===
Mansoor and Madden, as MxM Collection, made their Ring of Honor (ROH) debut on the July 4, 2024 episode of Ring of Honor Wrestling in a pre-taped vignette. On July 10, it was reported that MxM Collection had signed a deal with ROH and its sister promotion All Elite Wrestling (AEW). MxM Collection made their ROH in-ring debut at Death Before Dishonor: Zero Hour on July 26, defeating Spanish Announce Project (Angélico and Serpentico). MxM Collection made their AEW debut on the July 27 episode of AEW Collision, in a losing effort against FTR (Cash Wheeler and Dax Harwood). On the November 6, episode of Collision, MxM Collection formed an alliance with Johnny TV. At the Revolution pre-show on March 9, 2025, TV and MxM Collection lost to "Big Boom!" A.J., Orange Cassidy and Mark Briscoe in a trios match. TV and MxM Collection were later joined by TV's real-life wife Taya Valkyrie, forming MxM TV.

=== Consejo Mundial de Lucha Libre (2024–present) ===
On July 24, 2024, Mansoor was announced as a participant in the 2024 Grand Prix. On August 16, 2024, Mansoor X made his debut at the CMLL Super Viernes at the Arena México teaming with Rocky Romero losing against Niebla Roja and Ángel de Oro. On August 17, 2024, Mansoor teamed with Rocky Romero and Robbie X defeated Titán, Templario and Flip Gordon at the Arena Coliseo. On August 18, 2024, Mansoor teamed with Robbie X and Flip Gordon losing against Atlantis Jr., Máscara Dorada and Angel de Oro at the Arena México. On August 19, 2024, Mansoor teamed with Ikuro Kwon and Akira losing against Los Predadores! (Volador Jr., Magnus and Rugido) at the Arena Puebla. On August 23, 2024 at the CMLL Grand Prix Internacional, he was eliminated by Mascara Dorada.

=== DDT Pro-Wrestling (2025–present) ===
On June 29, 2025 at King of Kings, MxM Collection made their DDT Pro-Wrestling debut, defeating Danshoku Dino and Kazuki Hirata.

=== Pro Wrestling Rebellion (2026–present) ===
In 2026, Mansoor began working for the Indian independent promotion Pro Wrestling Rebellion (PWR) as an in-ring talent, writer, and a producer.

== Personal life ==
In 2017, American actor Shia LaBeouf, Finnish artist Nastja Säde Rönkkö, and British artist Luke Turner launched a political livestreaming installation, He Will Not Divide Us, which Al-Shehail and a group of friends participated in. During his time on stream, he became known as Punished Jesus or Jihadi Jesus by fans, and most notably donned an eyepatch and sang "Snake Eater", the opening theme to the 2004 video game Metal Gear Solid 3: Snake Eater, and re-enacted the opening scene to the 2012 film The Dark Knight Rises.

On April 27, 2021, Al-Shehail married his girlfriend Mia Carey. He also has a child.

== Championships and accomplishments ==
- Australian Championship Wrestling
  - ACW World Tag Team Championship (1 time, current) – with Mason Madden
- DDT Pro-Wrestling
  - Ironman Heavymetalweight Championship (1 time)
- East Bay Pro Wrestling
  - EBPW Championship (1 time)
- Hoodslam
  - Intergalactic Tag Team Championship (1 time) – with Mason Madden
- Pro Wrestling Illustrated
  - Ranked No. 181 of the top 500 singles wrestlers in the PWI 500 in 2021
- Wrestling Observer Newsletter
  - Worst Gimmick (2022) Maximum Male Models
- WWE
  - 51-Man Battle Royal
