= IWF Promotions =

American professional wrestling promotion

- Founded: 2001
- Style: Professional wrestling, lucha libre
- Headquarters: Denver, Colorado
- Founder(s): Tamera Halbeisen, Larry Shelton, Alan Carnill
- Owner(s): Tamera Halbeisen

IWF Promotions was an independent professional wrestling company based in Denver, Colorado that was founded in 2001 by Tamera Halbeisen. IWF was the only known wrestling company in the United States that was owned by a Hispanic Woman. Showcasing two styles of professional wrestling including American professional wrestling and the Mexican style; Lucha Libre with over 25 high-impact live events yearly in the Denver, Colorado metropolitan area.

== History ==
IWF Promotions was started July 14, 2001 by Tamera Halbeisen, Larry Shelton and Alan Carnill. Hosting shows with a Rock and Wrestling theme, booking local bands and independent professional wrestling at events held at the Gothic Theater in Denver, Colorado. Continuing to cross promote independent wrestling IWF joined with Knockout Events, a regional Toughman organization throughout 2002 and 2003 and then again in 2005.

Beginning in 2003 a series of semi-monthly events were held at the Sheridan Recreation Center, Sheridan, Colorado. Professional wrestlers involved in these events included The Honky Tonk Man, Superfly Jimmy Snuka, Beautiful Bobby Dean, Kato, Beetlejuice (Alan Carnill), breaking ground for many independent wrestlers such as Prodigee & Shocktherapy.

January 25, 2004 Co-Founder Alan Carnill was killed after he was thrown from a car in which he was a passenger. The car went out of control on an icy bridge before flipping over outside Hays, Kansas on his way back home to Colorado after working a wrestling show the night before in Hoisington, Kansas. The other passengers in the car include Larry Shelton, Carrie Mathews, Joseph McDougal and Gerald Krueger.

IWF continued to run semi-monthly events in the Denver, Colorado metropolitan area, as well in the rocky mountain region including Gillette, Wyoming, Pueblo and Fairplay, Colorado until closing in January 2005.

After a year and a half hiatus IWF resumed operations as IWF Premier Pro Wrestling by booking monthly wrestling shows and opened The Butcher Shop, a professional wrestling training gym located in Commerce City, Colorado. IWF Promotions currently runs monthly wrestling shows under IWF Premier, IWF Lucha Libre & Primos Hardcore & Wrestling throughout the metro Denver, Colorado area.

In August 2011 IWF Promotions was sold to Joseph McDougal and he continues to run it exclusively under the Primos Hardcore & Wrestling name, Joseph also runs and has maintained the Butcher Shop Pro Wrestling Gym in the Denver metro area.

== The Butcher Shop ==
The Butcher Shop trained both American or Sports Entertainment and Lucha Libre style wrestlers. Guest trainers have included Dennis Condrey, Jerry Lynn, Big Van Vader (Leon White), Mad Man Pondo (Kevin Canady), and Colt Cabana (Scott Colton).

== Publicity ==
In 2008 the Butcher Shop was featured by the Westword Newspaper.

The Greeley Tribune featured High Flying Wrestling action at the Fiesta.

IWF was featured in the Independent film Faces and Heels: A Real Look at Independent Wrestling by Daniel R. Beehler.

== Roster ==
American Wrestlers	Lucha Libre	Managers	Referees
Adrian Grimm	La Bestia	Bigg Mike	Brian Marks
Arik Angel	Fuersa Chicana	Michael Titus	Jonathan Douglas
Beetlejuice	Pikachu	Perfect 10	Scotty McLovin
Brandon Morris	Mathmatico		
Bronx	Momia		
Candyman	Huracancito Ramirez Jr.		
Chris Wrath
Derek Stone
Jack Mecidal
Jason Noel
Jay Synn
Joey Terrofyin
Johnny Crash
Joseph A. Kincade
Juntsu
Mascara Mistica
Noah Terrella
Patrick McDaniels
Paul Stetich
Prodigee
Rob Ryzin
Robert Romero
Romeo
Ronin The Rock-n-Roll Vampire
Rose Thorn
Sensi Dalton
Shredder Con
Superstar
Synjin Tiger Smith
Trajan Ender
War Dog Damien Payne

== Champions ==
IWF Championship
05/15/2011 to closure Rob Ryzin
01/2011 to 05/15/2011 Trajan Ender
04/2010 to 01/2011 Adrian Grimm
07/2009 to 04/2010 Hoodlum
04/2009 to 7/2009 Bronx
11/2008 to 4/2009 Vacant
10/2008 to 11/2008 Matt Yaden
05/2008 to 10/2009 Jesse Williams
12/2009 to 05/2008 Jay Synn
10/2007 to 12/2007 Justice

IWF Tag Team Champions
6/12/11 to closure Jason Noel & Noah Terrella
11/2010 to 6/12/11 Joseph A Kincade & Bronx
10/2010 to 11/2010 Paul Stetich & Sensai Dalton
4/2010 to 10/2010 Arik Angel & Paul Stetich
8/2009 to 4/2010 Primal Chaos: Damien Payne & Tiger Smith
01/2009 to 8/2009 The Horde: Adrian Grimm and Shredder Con
09/2008 to 01/2009 The Firm: Bronx and Hoodlum

IWF Hardcore Championship
04/2011 to closure Joseph A. Kincade
03/2011 to 04/2011 Bud Doobie
03/2010 to 03/2011 Juntsu
03/2008 to 3/2010 Joey Terrofyn
12/2007 to 3/2008 Shocktherapy

IWF Lucha Libre
4/2010 to closure Vacant
12/2009 to 4/2010 Quantum
11/2008 to 12/2009 Vagabundo
12/2007 to 11/2008 Quantum
10/2007 to 12/2007 Hurricancito Ramirez Jr.

IWF Annual A3 Cup Holder
2011 Prodigee
2010 Chris Wrath

== Friends of IWF ==
- Jerry Lynn
- Big Van Vader (Leon White)
- Dennis Condrey
- Mad Man Pondo (Kevin Canady)
- Scot Summers
- Corporal Robinson (Steve Robinson)
- Tiki Tapu
- Violent J (Joseph Frank "Joe" Bruce)
- Bobby Lashley
- Hijo de Rey Misterio
- The Universal Heartthrob Don Juan
- Colt Cabana (Scott Colton)

== See also ==
- List of independent wrestling promotions in the United States
