= MxM TV =

American professional wrestling stable

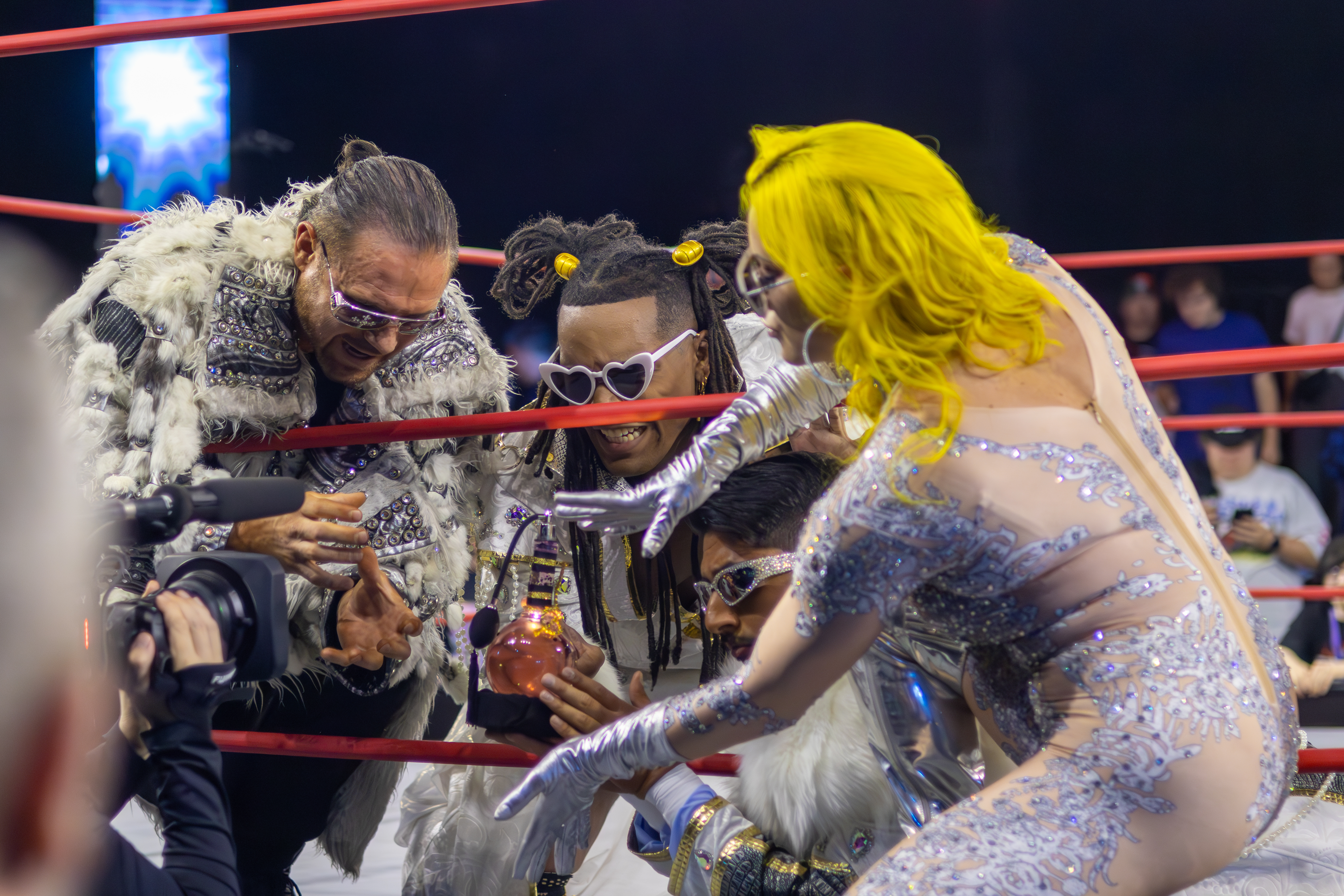
- From left to right: Johnny TV, Mason Madden, Mansoor and former member Taya Valkyrie in 2025

Stable
- Name(s): Knight Model Management; Maximum Male Models; MxM; MxM Collection; MxM TV
- Members: Mansoor / mån.sôör Mason Madden / Mace / ma.çé Johnny TV
- Billed heights: Madden: 6 ft 6 in (1.98 m); Mansoor: 6 ft 0 in (1.83 m); Johnny: 6 ft 0 in (1.83 m)
- Former members: Max Dupri (leader); Maxxine Dupri (valet); Taya Valkyrie
- Debut: July 1, 2022
- Years active: 2022–present

MxM TV is a professional wrestling stable consisting of Mason Madden, Mansoor, and Johnny TV. They are signed to All Elite Wrestling (AEW) and its sister promotion Ring of Honor (ROH), while also making occasional appearances on the independent circuit.

Originally a tag team consisting of Madden and Mansoor, the latter two formed in 2020 while signed to WWE. They were introduced as a stable including Max Dupri and Maxxine Dupri called the Maximum Male Models, in which they went by the ring names of Mace and Mansoor (stylized as ma.çé and mån.sôör).

== History ==
=== WWE (2022–2023) ===
On April 22, 2022 in a dark segment on SmackDown, Mansoor turned heel for the first time in WWE when he was announced as the newest member of LA Knight's stable, Knight Model Management alongside Mace. On the July 1 episode of SmackDown, Knight, now known as Max Dupri, announced Mace and Mansoor, under the tweaked names ma.çé and mån.sôör, as his new tag team Maximum Male Models. Maximum Male Models later welcomed Maxxine Dupri, Max's (kayfabe) sister, to manage the team. Max ended his relationship with Maximum Male Models on the September 30 episode of SmackDown and reverted to being LA Knight the following week. Maximum Male Models joined the Raw brand on February 6, 2023, and remained on Raw following the 2023 WWE Draft. After weeks of spending time with Otis of the Alpha Academy, Maxxine left Maximum Male Models to join Alpha Academy on the May 15 episode of Raw when she cheered on Otis and Chad Gable eliminating ma.çé and mån.sôör in the Intercontinental Championship number one contenders' battle royal match. After months of inactivity, ma.çé and mån.sôör were both released from their WWE contracts on September 21.

=== Independent circuit (2023–present) ===
After their releases from WWE, Mansoor and Mace continued their union. The two made their first post-WWE appearance at Deadlock Pro-Wrestling (DPW) 2nd Anniversary taping on December 10, 2023 as MxM, with Mace now going by the name of Mason Madden (sometimes Mason D. Madden). MxM made their in ring debut for DPW at DPW Live 4 on January 20, 2024. On April 13, MxM appeared for the Ugandan-based Soft Ground Wrestling (SGW) promotion, with their appearance helping give the rising promotion further notoriety, with many other wrestlers from promotions such as AEW and TNA showing their support for both the team and the promotion itself. On April 27, MxM appeared in the Middle East for Kingdom Pro Wrestling (KPW) promotion, in a show called KPW ComicCon.

=== All Elite Wrestling / Ring of Honor (2024–present) ===
Mansoor and Madden, as MxM Collection, made their Ring of Honor (ROH) debut on the 4 July 2024 episode of Ring of Honor Wrestling in a pre-taped vignette. On July 10, it was reported that MxM Collection had signed with a deal with ROH and its sister promotion All Elite Wrestling (AEW). MxM Collection made their ROH in-ring debut at Death Before Dishonor: Zero Hour on July 26, defeating Spanish Announce Project (Angélico and Serpentico). MxM Collection made their AEW debut on the July 27 episode of Collision in a losing effort against FTR (Cash Wheeler and Dax Harwood). On October 12 at WrestleDream, MxM Collection were managed by Rico Constantino in a bout against The Acclaimed but were defeated. On the November 2 episode of Collision, MxM Collection formed an alliance with Johnny TV. At the Revolution pre-show on March 9, 2025, TV and MxM Collection lost to "Big Boom!" A.J., Orange Cassidy and Mark Briscoe in a trios match. In August, MxM Collection and TV formed a stable including the latter's real-life wife Taya Valkyrie, named MxM TV. On October 4, the group began a weekly open challenge segment on Collision titled the "MxM TV Casting Call”, the first of which was answered by the Don Callis Family (Kyle Fletcher, Konosuke Takeshita and Josh Alexander). On November 4, 2026, Valkyrie announced that her AEW contract had expired and elected not to renew, ending her three-year tenure with the promotion and leaving MxM TV.

=== DDT Pro-Wrestling (2025–present) ===
On 29 June 2025 at King of Kings, MxM Collection made their DDT Pro-Wrestling debut, defeating Danshoku Dino and Kazuki Hirata.

=== Consejo Mundial de Lucha Libre (2026–present) ===
On January 30, 2026, MxM TV (minus Valkyrie) debuted for Consejo Mundial de Lucha Libre, with TV changing his ring name to Johnny Consejo. The group defeated Soberano Jr. and Los Hermanos Chàvez (Ángel de Oro and Niebla Roja).

== Members ==
*	Founding member(s)
I-II	Leader(s)
M	Manager

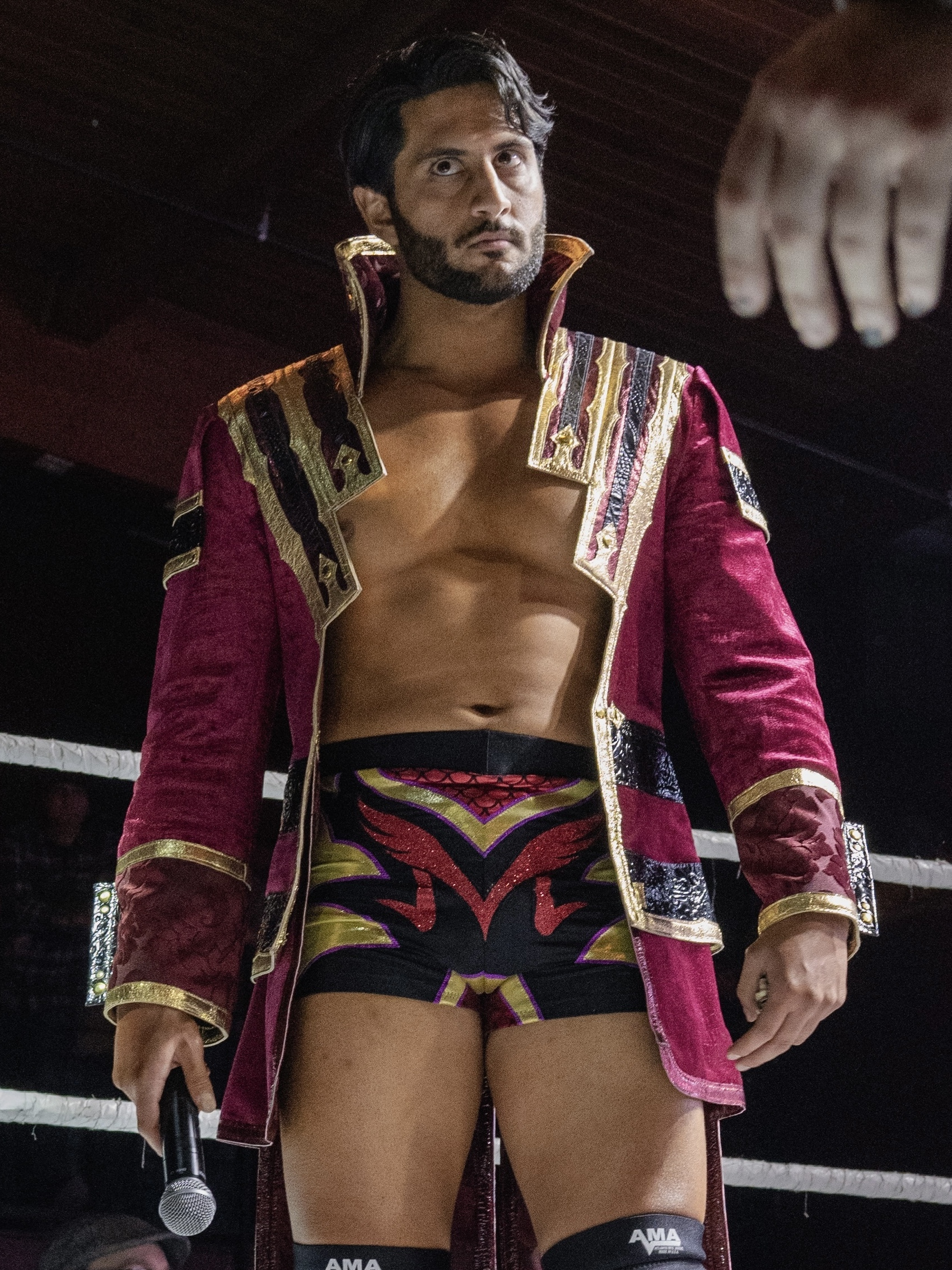
mån.sôör / Mansoor

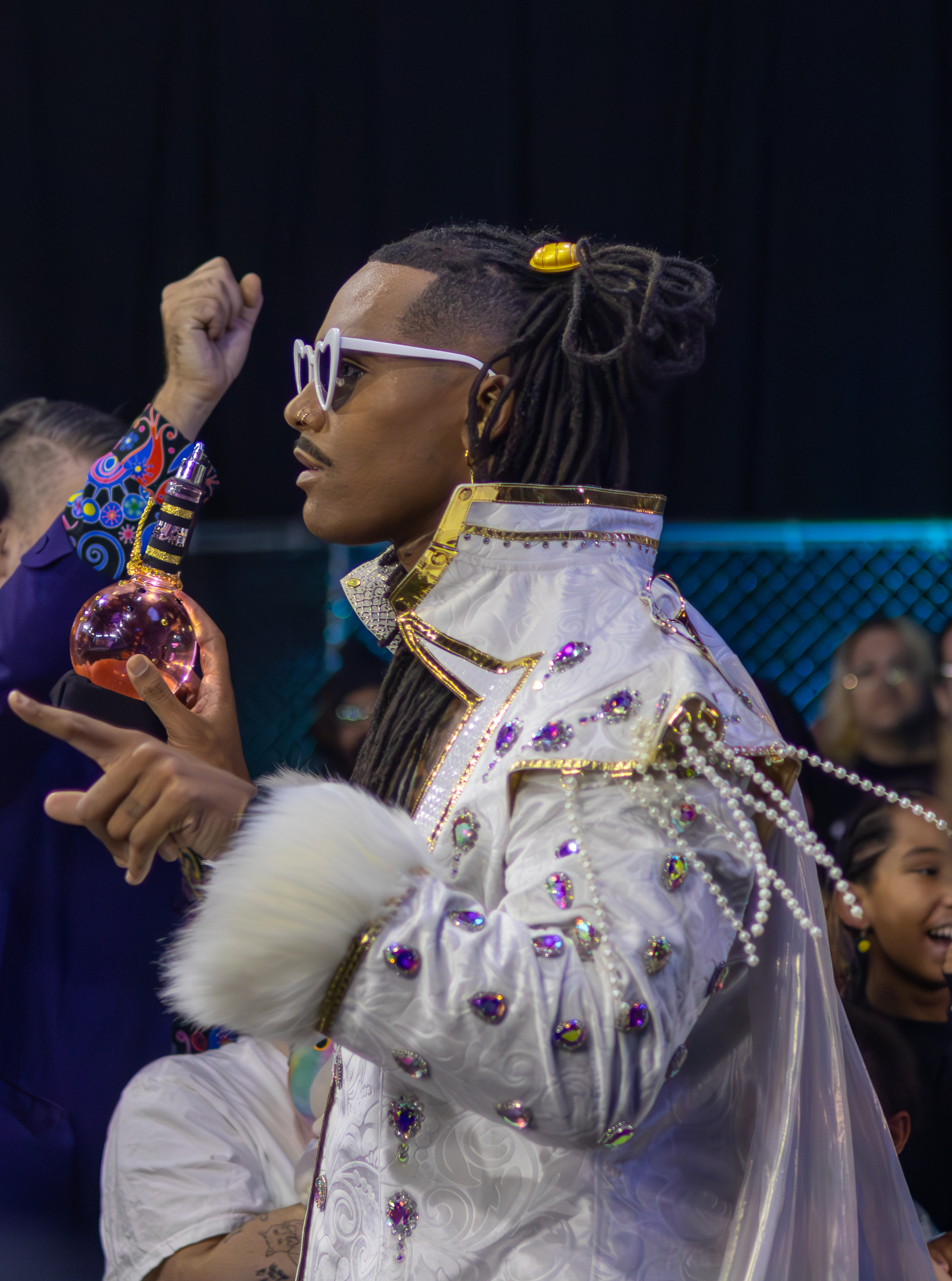
ma.çé / Mace / Mason Madden

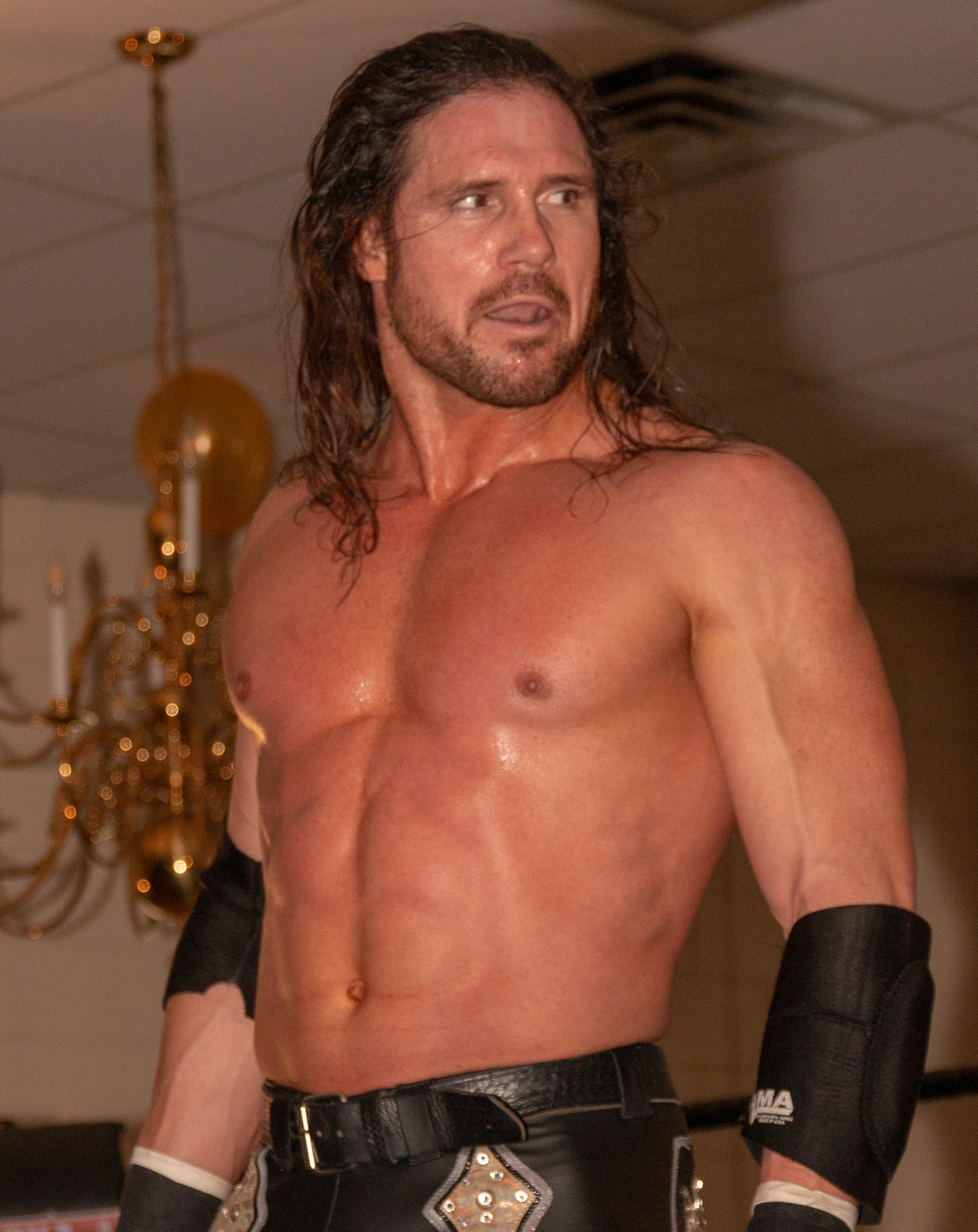
Johnny TV

=== Current ===
Members	Joined
mån.sôör / Mansoor	July 1, 2022 *
ma.çé / Mace / Mason Madden	July 1, 2022 *
Johnny TV	November 2, 2024

=== Former ===
Member		Joined	Left
Max Dupri	L/M	July 1, 2022 *	September 30, 2022
Maxxine Dupri	M	July 22, 2022	May 15, 2023
Taya Valkyrie		August 6, 2025	November 4, 2026

== Sub-groups ==
=== Current ===
Affiliate	Members	Tenure	Type	Promotion(s)
MxM Collection	Mansoor; Mason Madden	2022–present	Tag team	WWE; AEW; ROH; CMLL; Independent circuit

== Championships and accomplishments ==
- Australian Championship Wrestling
  - ACW World Tag Team Championship (1 time, current) – Madden and Mansoor
- DDT Pro-Wrestling
  - Ironman Heavymetalweight Championship (2 times) – Madden (1) and Mansoor (1)
- Hoodslam
  - Intergalactic Tag Team Championship (1 time) – Madden and Mansoor
- Mystery Wrestling
  - Mystery Wrestling World Championship (1 time, current) – Johnny
- Pro Wrestling Rebellion
  - PWR World Heavyweight Championship (1 time, current) – Johnny
- Wrestling Observer Newsletter
  - Worst Gimmick (2022) – as Maximum Male Models
