= List of professional wrestling promotions =

Listing of professional wrestling promotions by country

A professional wrestling promotion is a company or business that regularly performs shows involving professional wrestling. "Promotion" also describes a role which entails management, advertising and logistics of running a wrestling event. Within the convention of the show, the company is a sports governing body that sanctions wrestling matches and gives authority to the championships and is responsible for maintaining the divisions and their rankings. In truth, the company serves as a touring theatre troupe, as well as event promotion body for its own events.

Most promotions are self-contained, organized around one or more championships and do not acknowledge or recognize the legitimacy of other promotions' titles unless they share a working agreement. Governing bodies, such as the CyberFight, United Wrestling Network, WWNLive, Allied Independent Wrestling Federations, Union of European Wrestling Alliances, Pro Wrestling International and, previously, the National Wrestling Alliance, act as an umbrella organization that governs titles that are shared among multiple promotions. During the 1950s, the National Wrestling Alliance oversaw many wrestling territories such as Mid-Atlantic Wrestling and NWA San Francisco, in a business model known as the "territory system".

The most notable past and present professional wrestling promotions include:

== Australia and New Zealand ==
Active

- Australasian Wrestling Federation
- Impact Pro Wrestling
- International Wrestling Australia
- Melbourne City Wrestling
- New Zealand Wide Pro Wrestling
- Riot City Wrestling
- Southern Pro Wrestling
- World Series Wrestling

Defunct

- Dominion Wrestling Union
- I-Generation Superstars of Wrestling
- Pro Wrestling Women's Alliance
- World Championship Wrestling
- World Wrestling All-Stars

== Canada ==
Active

- Border City Wrestling
- Great Canadian Wrestling
- High Impact Wrestling Canada
- International Wrestling Syndicate
- Maple Leaf Pro Wrestling
- Northern Championship Wrestling
- nCw Femmes Fatales
- Real Canadian Wrestling
- Winnipeg Pro Wrestling

Defunct

- BSE Pro
- Elite Canadian Championship Wrestling
- Eastern Sports Association
- Hart Legacy Wrestling
- International Wrestling Alliance
- Lutte Internationale
- Maximum Pro Wrestling
- NWA: All-Star Wrestling
- Prairie Wrestling Alliance
- Stampede Wrestling

== Japan ==
Active

- Active Advance Pro Wrestling
- Actwres girl'Z
- All Japan Pro Wrestling
- Big Japan Pro Wrestling
- ChocoPro
- CyberFight
  (umbrella brand)
  - DDT Pro-Wrestling
  - Pro Wrestling Noah
  - Tokyo Joshi Pro-Wrestling
- Dradition
- Dragongate
- Dream Star Fighting Marigold
- Frontier Martial-Arts Wrestling-Explosion
- Ganbare Pro-Wrestling
- Gleat
- Ice Ribbon
- JTO
- Kyushu Pro-Wrestling
- Ladies Legend Pro-Wrestling-X
- Lion's Gate Project
- Marvelous
- Michinoku Pro Wrestling
- New Japan Pro-Wrestling
- Osaka Pro Wrestling
- Oz Academy
- Pro-Wrestling Basara
- Pro Wrestling Freedoms
- Pro Wrestling Land's End
- Pro-Wrestling Shi-En
- Pro Wrestling Wave
- Pro Wrestling Zero1
- Pure-J
- Seadlinnng
- Sendai Girls' Pro Wrestling
- Strong Style Pro-Wrestling
- Tenryu Project
- Tokyo Gurentai
- World Woman Pro-Wrestling Diana
- World Wonder Ring Stardom
- Wrestling of Darkness 666

Defunct

- All Japan Women's Pro-Wrestling
- Apache Pro-Wrestling Army
- Arsion
- Battlarts
- Diamond Ring
- Federacion Universal de Lucha Libre
- Fighting Network Rings
- Gaea Japan
- Global Professional Wrestling Alliance
- Hustle
- Inoki Genome Federation
- International Wrestling Enterprise
- IWA Japan
- Japan Pro-Wrestling
- Japan Women's Pro-Wrestling
- Japan Wrestling Association
- Jd'
- JWP Joshi Puroresu
- Kingdom
- NEO Japan Ladies Pro-Wrestling
- Never (professional wrestling)
- Pro Wrestling Fujiwara Gumi
- Riki Pro (WJ)
- Smash
- Super World of Sports
- Tokyo Pro Wrestling
- Universal Wrestling Federation
- Union Pro Wrestling
- UWF International
- Wrestle Association "R"
- Wrestling International New Generations
- Wrestle-1
- Wrestling New Classic

== Mexico ==
Active

- Alianza Universal De Lucha Libre
- Consejo Mundial de Lucha Libre
- International Wrestling Revolution Group
- Lucha Libre AAA Worldwide
- The Crash Lucha Libre
- Toryumon Mexico

Defunct

- International Wrestling League
- Los Perros del Mal
- Lucha Libre Elite
- Nación Lucha Libre
- Promo Azteca
- Universal Wrestling Association
- World Wrestling Association
- Xtreme Latin American Wrestling

== United Kingdom and Ireland ==
Active

- All Star Wrestling
- Attack! Pro Wrestling
- Bellatrix Female Warriors
- British Kingdom Pro-Wrestling
- Fight Factory Pro Wrestling
- Grand Pro Wrestling
- Insane Championship Wrestling
- Lucha Britannia
- New Generation Wrestling
- Over the Top Wrestling
- Pro Championship Wrestling
- PROGRESS Wrestling
- Pro-Wrestling: EVE
- Revolution Pro Wrestling
- TNT Extreme Wrestling
- World Association of Wrestling

Defunct

- 1 Pro Wrestling
- 5 Star Wrestling
- Frontier Wrestling Alliance
- International Pro Wrestling: United Kingdom
- Irish Whip Wrestling
- Joint Promotions
- Pro Wrestling Elite
- Pro Wrestling Pride
- World of Sport Wrestling
- X Wrestling Alliance

== United States ==
Active

- 4th Rope Wrestling
- All American Wrestling
- All Elite Wrestling
- All Pro Wrestling
- Assault Championship Wrestling
- Chaotic Wrestling
- Combat Zone Wrestling
- DEFY Wrestling
- East Coast Wrestling Association
- Empire Wrestling Federation
- Funking Conservatory
- Game Changer Wrestling
- House of Glory
- Independent Wrestling Federation
- Juggalo Championship Wrestling
- Lucha VaVOOM
- Major League Wrestling
- MCW Pro Wrestling
- Main Event Championship Wrestling
- National Wrestling Alliance
- New England Championship Wrestling
- Northeast Wrestling
- Ohio Valley Wrestling
- OnlyWrestlers
- Pro Wrestling Guerrilla
- Pro Wrestling Unplugged
- Reality of Wrestling
- Revolutionary Championship Wrestling
- Ring of Honor
- Southern States Wrestling
- Sukeban
- Texas All-Star Wrestling
- Top Rope Promotions
- Total Nonstop Action Wrestling
- Ultra Championship Wrestling-Zero
- United Wrestling Network
  (governing body)
  - 1 Fall Wrestling
  - Championship Wrestling
  - Gotham Wrestling
  - Memphis Wrestling
- Warrior Wrestling
- West Coast Wrestling Connection
- Women Superstars United
- Women of Wrestling
- Women's Wrestling Army
- World League Wrestling
- World Wrestling Network
  (governing body)
  - Full Impact Pro
  - Shine Wrestling
- WWE

Defunct (modern-era)

- American Wrestling Federation
- Century Wrestling Alliance
- Chikara
- CWF Mid-Atlantic Wrestling
- Deadlock Pro-Wrestling
- Deep South Wrestling
- Dragon Gate USA
- Extreme Championship Wrestling (1992–2001)
- Extreme Championship Wrestling (WWE, 2006–2010)
- Extreme Rising
- Evolve
- Family Wrestling Entertainment
- Florida Championship Wrestling
- Front Row Wrestling
- Future of Wrestling
- Global Force Wrestling
- Hardcore Homecoming
- Heartland Wrestling Association
- House of Hardcore
- Incredibly Strange Wrestling
- Independent Professional Wrestling Alliance
- Independent Wrestling Association Mid-South
- IWF Promotions
- Jersey All Pro Wrestling
- Lucha Libre USA
- Lucha Underground
- Mason-Dixon Wrestling
- Memphis Championship Wrestling
- Memphis Wrestling
  (governing body)
- Mid-Eastern Wrestling Federation
- Millennium Wrestling Federation
- Naked Women's Wrestling League
- National Championship Wrestling
- OMEGA Championship Wrestling
- Phoenix Championship Wrestling
- Power League Wrestling
- Pro-Pain Pro Wrestling
- Resistance Pro Wrestling
- Rise Wrestling
- Southern Championship Wrestling
- Shimmer Women Athletes
- Steel City Wrestling
- Texas Wrestling Alliance
- Turnbuckle Championship Wrestling
- Ultimate Pro Wrestling
- Warriors 4 Christ Wrestling
- Wrestling Society X
- Wrestling Superstars Live
- Wrestlicious
- Xcitement Wrestling Federation
- Xtreme Pro Wrestling
- World Wide Wrestling Alliance
- World Women's Wrestling
- World Wrestling Stars
- World Wrestling Legends
- World Xtreme Wrestling
- WrestleReunion

Defunct (territory-era)

- All-Star Championship Wrestling
- American Wrestling Association
- Championship Wrestling from Florida
- Championship Wrestling from Georgia
- Continental Championship Wrestling
- Continental Wrestling Association
- Georgia Championship Wrestling
- Global Wrestling Federation
- Gorgeous Ladies of Wrestling
- Heart of America Sports Attractions
- International Championship Wrestling
- International World Class Championship Wrestling
- International Wrestling Association
- International Wrestling Federation
- Jim Crockett Promotions
- Ladies Professional Wrestling Association
- Mid-South Wrestling
- Minneapolis Boxing and Wrestling Club
- National Wrestling Association
  (governing body)
- National Wrestling Federation
- Pacific Northwest Wrestling
- Powerful Women of Wrestling
- Pro Wrestling America
- Pro Wrestling USA
- Smoky Mountain Wrestling
- Southern Championship Wrestling (Georgia)
- Southwest Championship Wrestling
- St. Louis Wrestling Club
- United States Wrestling Association
- Universal Wrestling Federation
- Windy City Pro Wrestling
- World Championship Wrestling
- World Class Championship Wrestling
- World Wrestling Association
- World Wrestling Network
- Worldwide Wrestling Associates

== Other ==
Active

- (South Africa) Africa Wrestling Alliance
- (Brazil) Brazilian Wrestling Federation
- (India) Continental Wrestling Entertainment
- (France) Fédération Française de Catch Professionnel
- (Philippines) Filipino Pro Wrestling
- (Thailand) (Japan) Gatoh Move Pro Wrestling
- (France) International Catch Wrestling Alliance
- (Republic of Ireland) Irish Whip Wrestling
- (Israel) Israeli Pro Wrestling Association
- IWA Puerto Rico
- (Bahrain) Kingdom Pro Wrestling
- (Puerto Rico) La Liga Wrestling
- Singapore Pro Wrestling
- (Uganda) Soft Ground Wrestling
- (Germany) Westside Xtreme Wrestling
- (Puerto Rico) WWC
- (South Africa) World Wrestling Professionals
- Nigeria Professional Wrestling Federation
- (Nigeria) Pro Wrestling Africa
- ATTACK ! Pro Wrestling Nigeria
- (Nigeria) African Professional Wrestling Commission
- SuperHardCore Wrestling Club of Nigeria

Defunct

- (China) Oriental Wrestling Entertainment
- (Austria) (Germany) Catch Wrestling Association
- (India) Ring Ka King
- (Israel) Israeli Wrestling League
- Ultimate Wrestling Israel
- (Philippines) Philippine Wrestling Revolution
- (Philippines) Manila Wrestling Federation
- (Germany) Verband der Berufsringer
- (Nigeria) Gold Wrestling Association
- (Nigeria) Kicx Wrestling Entertainment
- (Nigeria) Fancy Super Star
- (Nigeria) HardCore Wrestling
- Nigeria Wrestling Board of Control
- (Nigeria) Power Mike International Promotions

== See also ==
- Lists of professional wrestling personnel
- List of women's wrestling promotions
