= DDT King of Kings =

King of Kings
- Promotions: CyberFight (2025–present)
- Brands: DDT Pro-Wrestling (2025–present)
- First event: King of Kings (2025)

King of Kings is a recurring professional wrestling event promoted by CyberFight for the DDT Pro-Wrestling brand (DDT). The event is held in June and airs as an internet pay-per-view (iPPV) on CyberFight's streaming service Wrestle Universe.

== History ==
In 2025, the first King of Kings event was produced by CyberFight's DDT Pro-Wrestling brand in Korakuen Hall, as a replacement for What Are You Doing, which served as DDT's June event between 2008 and 2024.

== Events ==
| Event | Date | City | Venue | Main event | Ref. |
|---|---|---|---|---|---|
| King of Kings: Storm's June Showdown | June 29, 2025 | Tokyo, Japan | Korakuen Hall | Chris Brookes (c) vs. Kazusada Higuchi for the KO-D Openweight Championship | |
| King of Kings 2026: Tenka Tairan | June 28, 2026 | Tokyo, Japan | Korakuen Hall | Yuki Ueno (c) vs. Shinya Aoki for the KO-D Openweight Championship | |
(c) – refers to the champion(s) heading into the match
