= Mason Madden =

American football player and professional wrestler (born 1991)

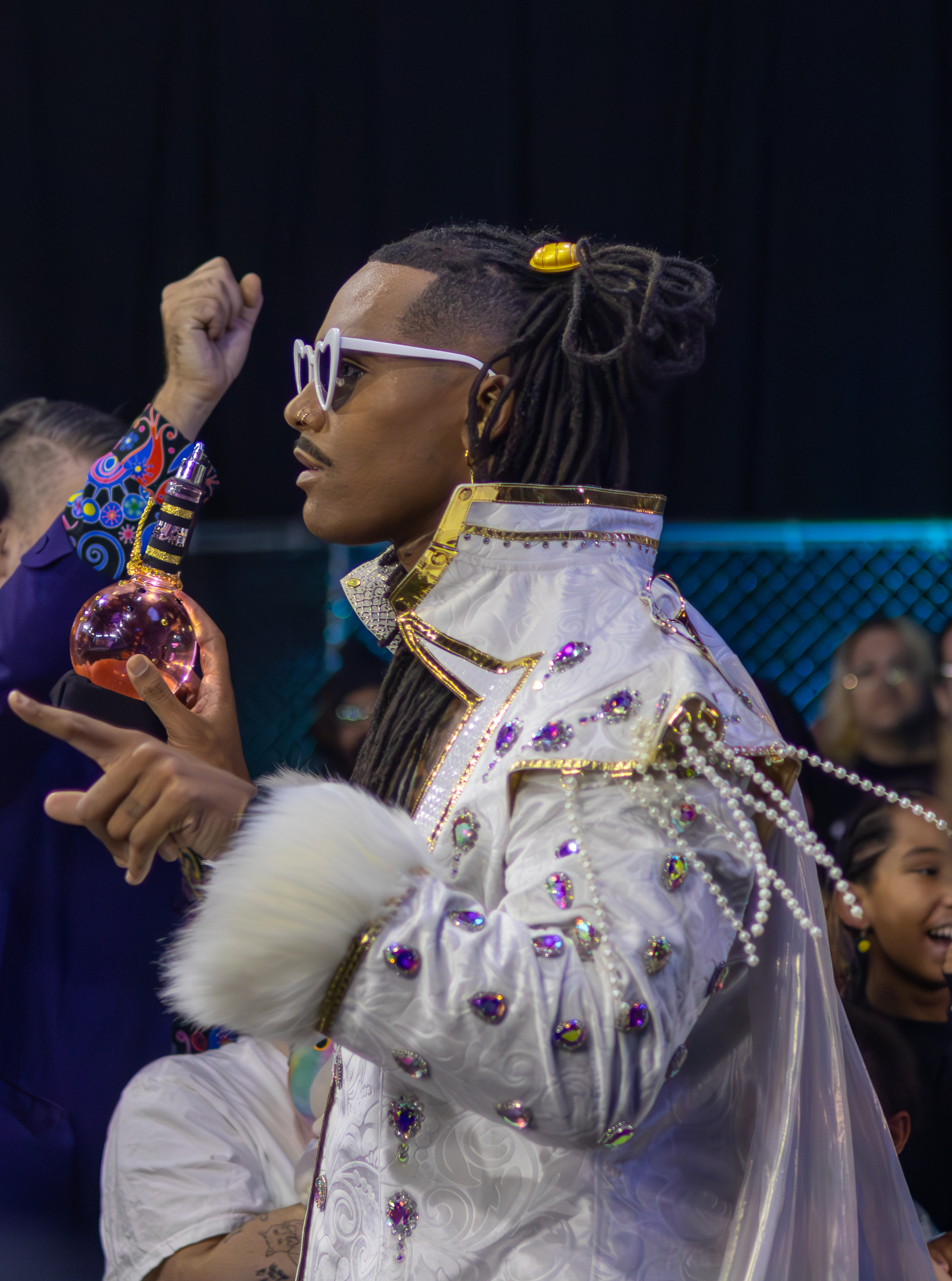
- Williams in August 2025
- Born: Brennan Marcel Williams; February 5, 1991 (age 35); Easton, Massachusetts, U.S.
- Education: UNC Chapel Hill
- Spouse: Ciarra Williams
- Children: 3
- Family: Brent Williams (father)
- Professional wrestling career
- Ring names: Brennan Williams; Dio Maddin; Mace; ma.çé; Marcellus Black; Mase Madden; Mason Madden; Mason D. Madden
- Billed height: 6 ft 8 in (203 cm)
- Billed weight: 286 lb (130 kg)
- Billed from: "The savage lands of Shaolin"
- Trained by: Booker T; Matt Bloom; Reality of Wrestling; Robbie Brookside; WWE Performance Center
- Debut: February 1, 2016
- Football career

No. 73, 65
- Position: Offensive tackle

Personal information
- Listed height: 6 ft 6 in (1.98 m)
- Listed weight: 314 lb (142 kg)

Career information
- High school: Catholic Memorial (West Roxbury, Massachusetts)
- College: North Carolina
- NFL draft: 2013: 3rd round, 89th overall pick

Career history
- Houston Texans (2013); Jacksonville Jaguars (2015)*; New England Patriots (2015)*
- * Offseason or practice squad member only
- Stats at Pro Football Reference

Brennan Marcel Williams (born February 5, 1991) is an American professional wrestler and former football player. He is signed to All Elite Wrestling (AEW) and its sister promotion Ring of Honor (ROH), where he performs under the ring name Mason Madden and is one-half of MxM Collection alongside Mansoor as members of MxM TV. He also makes appearances on the independent circuit. He is best known for his tenure in WWE, where he performed under the ring names Dio Maddin, Mace, and ma.çé.

Prior to beginning his professional wrestling career, Williams played college football for the North Carolina Tar Heels. He was selected by the Houston Texans of the National Football League (NFL) in the third round of the 2013 NFL draft. He joined WWE from 2016 to 2023.

== Early life ==
Williams was born in North Easton, Massachusetts, and attended Catholic Memorial School in the West Roxbury neighborhood of Boston.

While at Catholic Memorial, Williams was a member of PrepStar's High School All-America team, a member of the "Super 26" team in 2008, an all-scholastic by the Boston Globe and Boston Herald. He was named all-conference as both a junior and senior. He was rated as the eighth best offensive lineman in the country by SuperPrep All-America. Rivals.com rated him the seventh best offensive guard in the country. Scout.com rated him as the 15th best offensive lineman in the country. ESPN.com rated him the 35th best offensive tackle in the country. He was also a member of the Rivals 250. He also played in the U.S. Army All-American Bowl.

On February 15, 2014, Williams's number 73 was retired by Catholic Memorial.

== Football career ==
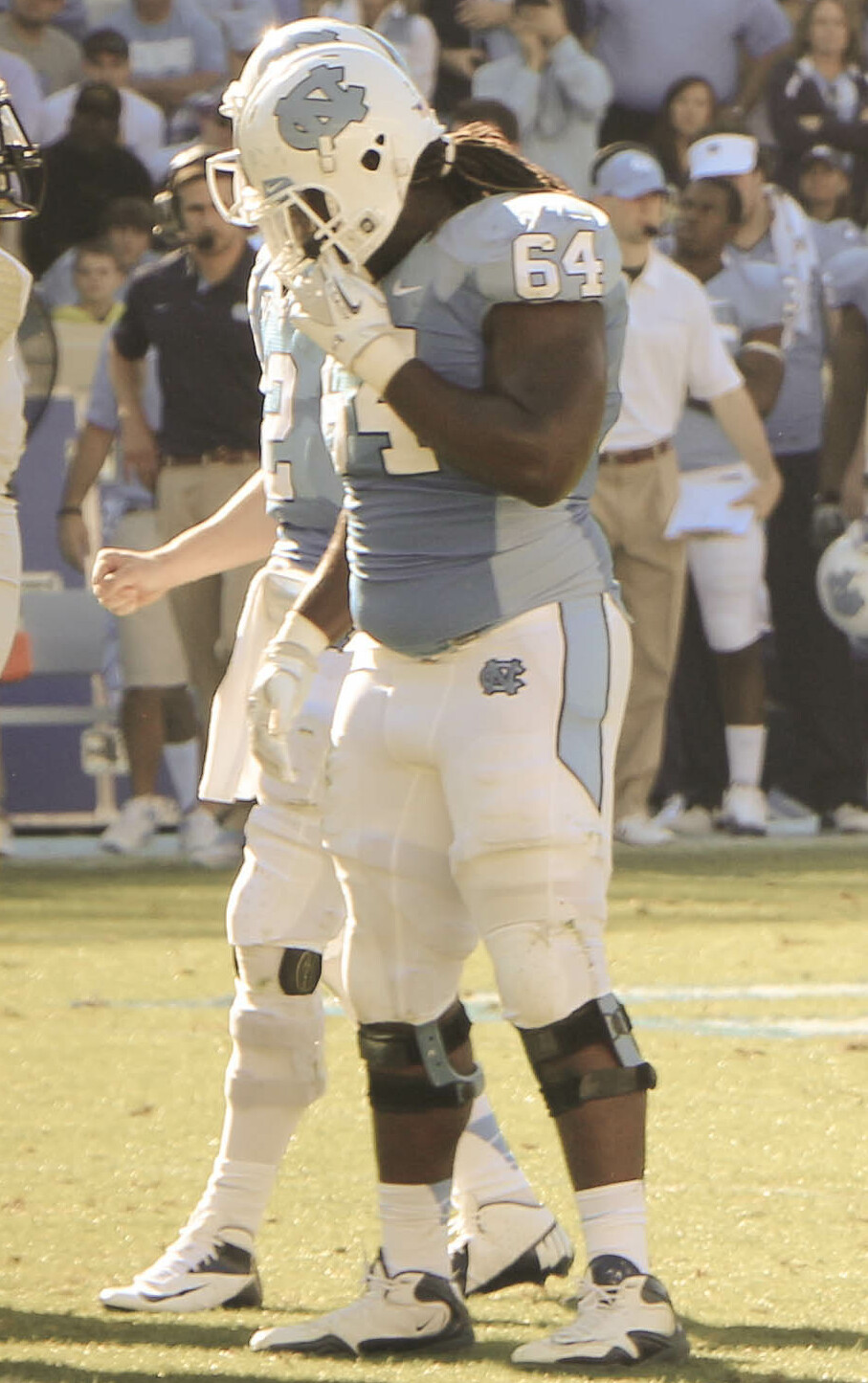
Williams with North Carolina in 2012.

=== College ===
Williams received an athletic scholarship to attend the University of North Carolina at Chapel Hill, where he played for the North Carolina Tar Heels football team from 2009 to 2012. As a senior in 2012, he received honorable mention All-Atlantic Coast Conference (ACC) honors. Williams tore his labrum his senior year of college. Williams majored in communications while attending North Carolina.

=== Professional ===
==== Houston Texans ====
The Houston Texans selected Williams in the third round with the 89th overall pick of the 2013 NFL draft. He would go on to miss his rookie season with a microfracture in his knee. On July 21, 2014, he was released.

==== Jacksonville Jaguars ====
On February 20, 2015, Williams was signed by the Jacksonville Jaguars, to a two-year contract, with the intention of being a backup to starter Jermey Parnell. On August 29, 2015, Williams was released by Jacksonville.

==== New England Patriots ====
On October 20, 2015, the New England Patriots signed Williams to their practice squad. They waived him two days later.

== Professional wrestling career ==
=== Early career (2016) ===
After being released by the Patriots, Williams returned to Houston to train to become a professional wrestler under the tutelage of WWE star Booker T. He made his debut with Booker's Reality of Wrestling promotion on February 1, 2016, under the ring name of Marcellus Black.

=== WWE (2016–2023) ===
==== Early appearances (2016–2020) ====
On February 11, 2016, Williams participated in a WWE try-out at the WWE Performance Center in Orlando, Florida. On August 1, 2016, WWE officially announced the signing of Williams, who started training at the Performance Center the same day. He made his in-ring debut for the company at a NXT live event in Orlando, Florida, on September 30, 2016, competing in a battle royal.

In June 2019, Brennan was given the new ring name, Dio Maddin. On September 10, Maddin joined the commentary team for 205 Live, replacing Nigel McGuinness. Later that same month, WWE announced as part of their "Premiere Week" that the commentary teams would be changed, with Maddin becoming an analyst for the Raw commentary team with Vic Joseph and Jerry Lawler. His work as commentator ended in November 2019, when he was sent back to NXT to train as a wrestler. His absence was explained when, on the November 4, 2019, edition of Raw, Maddin was attacked by Brock Lesnar who performed an F-5 on Maddin through the announcer's table.

==== Retribution (2020–2022) ====
On the September 21, 2020, episode of Raw, he made his main roster debut. Now as a wrestler, he was revealed as a member of the villainous stable Retribution, under the ring name Mace, with a mask, new outfit, and sporting a noticeably lighter and more defined physique. On the October 5 episode of Raw, Mustafa Ali revealed as the stable's leader. At Fastlane on March 21, 2021, Mace and T-Bar attacked Ali, disbanding the stable. On the April 12 episode of Raw, Mace and T-Bar attacked Drew McIntyre. The following week on Raw, Mace was finally unmasked along with T-Bar in a tag team match against McIntyre and Braun Strowman, in which Mace and T-Bar won by disqualification. Later in an interview, they confirmed the start of their tag team run. As part of the 2021 Draft, Mace was selected to the SmackDown brand while T-Bar remained on the Raw brand, thus disbanding the team.

==== Maximum Male Models (2022–2023) ====
On the April 15, 2022, episode of SmackDown, Mace returned in a dark segment as LA Knight's first acquisition under Knight Model Management. Following the announcement, Mace defeated Erik of The Viking Raiders in a dark match. On the July 1 episode of SmackDown, Knight, now known as Max Dupri, announced Mace and Mansoor, under the tweaked names ma.çé and mån.sôör, as his new tag team, Maximum Male Models. Maximum Male Models later welcomed Maxxine Dupri, Max's (kayfabe) sister, to manage the team. Maximum Male Models joined the Raw brand on February 6, 2023, and remained on Raw following the 2023 WWE Draft. After weeks of spending time with Otis of the Alpha Academy, Maxxine left Maximum Male Models to join Alpha Academy on the May 15 episode of Raw when she cheered on Otis and Chad Gable eliminating ma.çé and mån.sôör in the Intercontinental Championship number one contenders' battle royal match. After months of inactivity, ma.çé and mån.sôör both announced on X that they were no longer with WWE on September 21.

=== Independent circuit (2023–present) ===
Madden made a surprise appearance at Deadlock Pro-Wrestling (DPW) 2nd Anniversary taping on December 10, 2023, alongside Mansoor as part of the tag team MxM. MxM made their in ring debut for DPW at DPW Live 4 on January 20, 2024.

On April 13, MxM appeared for the Ugandan-based Soft Ground Wrestling (SGW) promotion, with their appearance helping give the rising promotion further notoriety, with many other wrestlers from promotions such as AEW and TNA showing their support for both the team and the promotion itself.

=== All Elite Wrestling / Ring of Honor (2024–present) ===
Madden and Mansoor, as MxM Collection, made their Ring of Honor (ROH) debut on the July 4, 2024 episode of Ring of Honor Wrestling in a pre-taped vignette. On July 10, it was reported that MxM Collection had signed a deal with ROH and its sister promotion All Elite Wrestling (AEW). MxM Collection made their ROH in-ring debut at Death Before Dishonor: Zero Hour on July 26 defeating Spanish Announce Project (Angélico and Serpentico). MxM Collection made their AEW debut on the July 27 episode of AEW Collision, in a losing effort against FTR (Cash Wheeler and Dax Harwood). On the November 6, episode of Collision, MxM Collection formed an alliance with Johnny TV.

At the Revolution pre-show on March 9, 2025, TV and MxM Collection lost to "Big Boom!" A.J., Orange Cassidy and Mark Briscoe in a trios match. TV and MxM Collection were later joined by TV's real-life wife Taya Valkyrie, forming MxM TV.

=== DDT Pro-Wrestling (2025–present) ===
On June 29, 2025, at King of Kings, MxM Collection made their DDT Pro-Wrestling debut, defeating Danshoku Dino and Kazuki Hirata.

== Personal life ==
Williams is the son of Jacquelyn and former NFL defensive end Brent Williams. He has three children with his wife Ciarra. His brother Cam played as a linebacker for Ohio State and became a scout for the New England Patriots. His younger sister Jaylen, a former basketball player at Penn State, signed with the WWE from August 19, 2021, until April 29, 2022. Williams has been a fan of professional wrestling growing up, citing Eddie Guerrero and The Great Muta as some of his favorite wrestlers. He is also a fan of video games, anime and manga. His love for anime is part of his wrestling gimmick, with his running knee attack named "Nico Nico Knee", a play on the catchphrase "Nico Nico Nii" which belongs to the character Nico Yazawa from the anime Love Live!.

== Other media ==
JiBo VT

YouTube information
- Channel: JiBoVT
- Years active: 2021–present
- Genre: VTuber
- Subscribers: 12.2 thousand
- Views: 872.4 thousand
- Last updated: March 30, 2025

Williams has appeared in various streams on the tabletop role-playing YouTube channel The Third Wheel, most notably in the role of The Batsu Sama, the scariest person in the world. He joined the main series of the channel "Thrilling Intent", as a steely alchemist named Harlock, with a bionic arm and a love for traps, as well as another series on the channel, No Smarts But Hearts, where he plays the prestigious Clover Von Krone, a warm-natured, but incredibly strong member with the elite Adventurer Knights. He also appears on several series on the tabletop role-playing channel Stabbyness, in "Forgotten Indigo", "Carbon Interface", and "Reflection".

Williams took part in multiple collaborations with the YouTube channel Super Best Friends Play, where he earned the nickname "Better Woolie" for his resemblance to group member Woolie Madden, from which his name change to Dio Maddin is partly derived. He also appeared in a Minecraft Wrestling Show called "Minecraft Wrestling Alliance".

He has also done voice-over/narration for various videos, such as "Jojo's Bizarre Adventure Part 2" by Did You Know Anime, and "Welcome to YouTube Comments (2016) - Part 1" by JelloApocalypse.

On February 3, 2021, Williams re-launched his YouTube channel as a VTuber under the name JiBo.

== Championships and accomplishments ==
- Australian Championship Wrestling
  - ACW World Tag Team Championship (1 time, current) – with Mansoor
- DDT Pro-Wrestling
  - Ironman Heavymetalweight Championship (1 time)
- Hoodslam
  - Intergalactic Tag Team Championship (1 time) – with Mansoor
- Pro Wrestling Illustrated
  - Ranked No. 211 of the top 500 singles wrestlers in the PWI 500 in 2021
- WrestleCrap
  - Gooker Award (2020) – as part of Retribution
- Wrestling Observer Newsletter
  - Worst Gimmick (2022) Maximum Male Models

== See also ==
- List of gridiron football players who became professional wrestlers
