= WXw World Tag Team Festival =

World Tag Team Festival
- Promotions: Westside Xtreme Wrestling
- First event: 2015
- Event gimmick: Round-robin tournament Single-elimination tournament

The wXw World Tag Team Festival, formerly known as the wXw World Tag Team League is an annual single-elimination tournament produced by the Westside Xtreme Wrestling (wXw) promotion. The competition was first conceived in 2015 and has been held every year since then with the exception of the 2020 and 2021 editions which was cancelled due to the COVID-19 pandemic.

== 2015 ==
The 2016 edition of the tournament took place between October 2 and 4 in Oberhausen, Germany.

Round 1 (October 2 and 3, 2015)
Big Daddy Walter and Zack Sabre Jr.	Pin
Reich Und Schön (Kevin Roadster and Marius van Beethoven)	11:13
French Flavour (Lucas Di Leo and Peter Fischer)	7:16
Bullet Club (Doc Gallows and Karl Anderson)	Pin
Cerberus (Julian Nero and Robert Dreissker)	Pin
Prost (Mike Schwarz and Toby Blunt)	8:42
Die Schilds (Bobby Gunns and Vincent The Beast)	11:11
Calamari Catch Kings (Chris Brookes and Jonathan Gresham)	Pin
Jurn Simmons and Tyler Bate	Pin
Champions Of Champions (Absolute Andy and John Klinger)	13:37
Young Lions (Hakan Aslan and Tarkan Aslan)	10:06
Hot And Spicy (Axel Dieter Jr. and Da Mack)	Pin
Sumerian Death Squad (Michael Dante and Tommy End)	Pin
Super Smash Brothers (Evil Uno and Stu Grayson)	11:17
ACH and Tommaso Ciampa	15:10
reDRagon (Bobby Fish and Kyle O'Reilly)	Pin

Quarterfinals (October 2 and 3, 2015)
Big Daddy Walter and Zack Sabre Jr.	Pin
Bullet Club (Doc Gallows and Karl Anderson)	14:31
Cerberus (Julian Nero and Robert Dreissker)	7:45
Calamari Catch Kings (Chris Brookes and Jonathan Gresham)	Count-out
Jurn Simmons and Tyler Bate	6:50
Hot And Spicy; Axel Dieter Jr. and Da Mack)	Pin
Sumerian Death Squad (Michael Dante and Tommy End)	13:44
reDRagon (Bobby Fish and Kyle O'Reilly)	Pin

Semifinals (October 4, 2015)
Big Daddy Walter and Zack Sabre Jr.	Pin
Calamari Catch Kings (Chris Brookes and Jonathan Gresham)	13:09
Hot And Spicy; Axel Dieter Jr. and Da Mack)	16:01
reDRagon (Bobby Fish and Kyle O'Reilly)	Pin

Final (October 4, 2015)
Big Daddy Walter and Zack Sabre Jr.	Pin
reDRagon (Bobby Fish and Kyle O'Reilly)	18:36

== 2016 ==
The 2016 edition of the tournament took place between September 30 and October 2 in Oberhausen, Germany.

Final standings
Block A		Block B	
JML (David Starr and Shane Strickland)	6	The Leaders Of The New School (Marty Scurll and Zack Sabre Jr.)	7
Ringkampf (Walter and Timothy Thatcher)	6	Death By Elbow (Chris Hero and J. T. Dunn)	4
Moustache Mountain (Trent Seven and Tyler Bate)	3	A4 (Absolute Andy and Marius Al-Ani)	3
Los Gueros Del Cielo (Angélico and Jack Evans)	3	Cerberus (Ilja Dragunov and Julian Nero)	3

Block A	Starr Strickland	Walter Thatcher	Seven Bate	Angélico Evans
Starr Strickland	—N/a	Starr; Strickland (15:42)	Starr; Strickland	Angélico; Evans (8:15)
Walter Thatcher	Starr; Strickland (15:42)	—N/a	Gunther; Thatcher (11:00)	Gunther; Thatcher
Seven Bate	Starr; Strickland	Gunther; Thatcher (11:00)	—N/a	Seven; Bate (12:17)
Angélico Evans	Angélico; Evans (8:15)	Gunther; Thatcher	Seven; Bate (12:17)	—N/a

Block B	Scurll Sabre Jr.	Hero Dunn	Andy Al-Ani	Dragunov Nero
Scurll Sabre Jr.	—N/a	Draw (30:00)	Scurll; Sabre Jr. (17:04)	Scurll; Sabre Jr.
Hero Dunn	Draw (30:00)	—N/a	Andy; Al-Ani (20:44)	Hero; Dunn (16:19)
Andy Al-Ani	Scurll; Sabre Jr. (17:04)	Andy; Al-Ani (20:44)	—N/a	Dragunov; Nero (14:22)
Dragunov Nero	Scurll; Sabre Jr.	Hero; Dunn (16:19)	Dragunov; Nero (14:22)	—N/a

Final
A1	JML (David Starr and Shane Strickland)	Pin (Note: This match was also disputed for the vacant wXw World Tag Team Championship.)
B1	The Leaders Of The New School (Marty Scurll and Zack Sabre Jr.)	—

== 2017 ==
The 2017 edition of the tournament took place between October 6 and 8 in Oberhausen, Germany.

Final standings
Block A		Block B	
Massive Product (David Starr and Jurn Simmons)	9	Ringkampf (Walter and Timothy Thatcher)	6
The Young Lions (Lucky Kid and Tarkan Aslan)	3	The Briscoes (Jay Briscoe and Mark Briscoe)	6
A4 (Absolute Andy and Marius Al-Ani)	3	The Rottweilers (Homicide and Low Ki)	3
Spirit Squad (Kenny and Mikey)	3	EYFBO (Angel Ortiz and Mike Draztik)	3

Block A	Starr Simmons	Kid Aslan	Andy Al-Ani	Kenny Mikey
Starr Simmons	—N/a	Starr; Simmons (13:39)	Starr; Simmons (19:29)	Starr; Simmons (11:32)
Kid Aslan	Starr; Simmons (13:39)	—N/a	Andy; Al-Ani (15:43)	Kid; Aslan (11:09)
Andy Al-Ani	Starr; Simmons (19:29)	Andy; Al-Ani (15:43)	—N/a	Kenny; Mikey (6:23)
Kenny Mikey	Starr; Simmons (11:32)	Kid; Aslan (11:09)	Kenny; Mikey (6:23)	—N/a

Block B	Walter Thatcher	Briscoe Briscoe	Homicide Low Ki	Ortiz Draztik
Walter Thatcher	—N/a	Walter; Thatcher (20:20)	Homicide; Low Ki (17:29)	Walter; Thatcher (11:30)
Briscoe Briscoe	Walter; Thatcher (20:20)	—N/a	Briscoe; Briscoe (forfeit)	Briscoe; Briscoe (11:55)
Homicide Low Ki	Homicide; Low Ki (17:29)	Briscoe; Briscoe (forfeit)	—N/a	Ortiz; Dratzik (11:30)
Ortiz Draztik	Walter; Thatcher (11:30)	Briscoe; Briscoe (11:55)	Ortiz; Dratzik (11:30)	—N/a

Final
A1	Massive Product (David Starr and Jurn Simmons)	Pin (Note: This match was also disputed for the vacant wXw World Tag Team Championship.)
B1	Ringkampf (Walter and Timothy Thatcher)	13:10

== 2018 ==
The 2018 edition of the tournament took place between October 5 and 7 in Oberhausen, Germany.

Final standings
Block A		Block B	
Calamari Catch Kings (Chris Brookes and Jonathan Gresham)	6	Jay FK (Francis Kaspin and Jay Skillet)	6
Ringkampf (Walter and Timothy Thatcher)	6	Aussie Open (Kyle Fletcher and Mark Davis)	6
Lucha Brothers (Penta El Zero Miedo and Rey Fénix)	3	Angélico and Jeff Cobb	3
Okami (Daichi Hashimoto and Hideyoshi Kamitani)	3	Monster Consulting (Avalanche and Julian Nero)	3

Block A	Brookes Gresham	Walter Thatcher	Miedo Fénix	Hashimoto Kamitani
Brookes Gresham	—N/a	Brookes; Gresham (14:37)	Brookes; Gresham (9:05)	Hashimoto; Kamitani (13:50)
Walter Thatcher	Brookes; Gresham (14:37)	—N/a	Walter; Thatcher (15:50)	Walter; Thatcher (10:32)
Miedo Fénix	Brookes; Gresham (9:05)	Walter; Thatcher (15:50)	—N/a	Miedo; Fénix (7:08)
Hashimoto Kamitani	Hashimoto; Kamitani (13:50)	Walter; Thatcher (10:32)	Miedo; Fénix (7:08)	—N/a

Block B	Kaspin Skillet	Fletcher Davis	Angélico Cobb	Avalanche Nero
Kaspin Skillet	—N/a	Kaspin; Skillet (7:51)	Kaspin; Skillet (14:10)	Avalanche; Nero (10:10)
Fletcher Davis	Kaspin; Skillet (7:51)	—N/a	Fletcher; Davis (16:35)	Fletcher; Davis (12:12)
Angélico Cobb	Kaspin; Skillet (14:10)	Fletcher; Davis (16:35)	—N/a	Angélico; Cobb (14:07)
Avalanche Nero	Avalanche; Nero (10:10)	Fletcher; Davis (12:12)	Angélico; Cobb (14:07)	—N/a

Final
A1	Calamari Catch Kings (Chris Brookes and Jonathan Gresham)	Pin (Note: This match was also disputed for the vacant wXw World Tag Team Championship.)
B1	Jay FK (Francis Kaspin and Jay Skillet)	13:10

== 2019 ==
The 2019 edition of the tournament took place between October 4 and 6 in Oberhausen, Germany.

First rounds (October 4, 2019)
The Pretty Bastards (Maggot and Prince Ahura)	Pin
Jay-AA (Absolute Andy and Jay Skillet)	—
The Crown (Alexander James and Jurn Simmons)	—
David Starr and Norman Harras	Pin
Arrows Of Hungary (Dover and Icarus)	Pin
Violence is Forever (Dominic Garrini and Kevin Ku)	—
Schadenfreude (Kyle Fletcher and Lucky Kid)	—
The Purge Club (Ivan Kiev and Pete Bouncer)	Pin
The WorkHorsemen (Anthony Henry and JD Drake)	Pin
The Anti-Fun Police (Chief Deputy Dunne and Los Federales Santos Jr.)	—
Ringkampf (Timothy Thatcher and Veit Müller)	17:09
Danny Burch and Oney Lorcan	Pin

Semifinals (October 5, 2019)
The Pretty Bastards (Maggot and Prince Ahura)	Pin
David Starr and Norman Harras	—
Arrows Of Hungary (Dover and Icarus)	Pin
The Purge Club (Ivan Kiev and Pete Bouncer)	—
The WorkHorsemen (Anthony Henry and JD Drake)	—
Danny Burch and Oney Lorcan	Pin

Finals (October 6, 2019)
The Pretty Bastards (Maggot and Prince Ahura)	Pin
Arrows Of Hungary (Dover and Icarus)	—
Danny Burch and Oney Lorcan	—

== 2022 ==
The 2022 edition of the tournament took place between October 1 and 3 in Oberhausen, Germany.

Final standings
Block A		Block B	
Frenchadors (Aigle Blanc and Senza Volto)	6	Amboss (Icarus and Robert Dreissker)	6
Calamari Drunken Kings (Chris Brookes and Masahiro Takanashi)	4	Fuminori Abe and Shigehiro Irie	6
Pretty Bastards (Ahura and Maggot)	4	Violence is Forever (Dominic Garrini and Kevin Ku)	3
SAnitY (Axel Tischer and Eric Young)	3	Rott Und Flott (Michael Schenkenberg and Nikita Charisma)	3

Block A	Blanc Volto	Brookes Takanashi	Ahura Maggot	Tischer Young
Blanc Volto	—N/a	Blanc; Volto (17:58)	Ahura; Maggot (10:24)	Blanc; Volto (7:48)
Brookes Takanashi	Blanc; Volto (17:58)	—N/a	Draw (20:00)	Brookes; Takanashi (12:12)
Ahura Maggot	Ahura; Maggot (10:24)	Draw (20:00)	—N/a	Tischer; Young (7:40)
Tischer Young	Blanc; Volto (7:48)	Brookes; Takanashi (12:12)	Tischer; Young (7:40)	—N/a

Block B	Icarus Dreissker	Abe Irie	Garrini Ku	Schenkenberg Charisma
Icarus Dreissker	—N/a	Icarus; Dreissker (15:57)	Icarus; Dreissker (10:42)	Schenkenberg; Charisma (6:51)
Abe Irie	Icarus; Dreissker (15:57)	—N/a	Abe; Irie (15:07)	Abe; Irie (10:38)
Garrini Ku	Icarus; Dreissker (10:42)	Abe; Irie (15:07)	—N/a	Garrini; Ku (9:41)
Schenkenberg Charisma	Schenkenberg; Charisma (6:51)	Abe; Irie (10:38)	Garrini; Ku (9:41)	—N/a

Final
A1	Frenchadors (Aigle Blanc and Senza Volto)	Pin (Note: This match was also disputed for the vacant wXw World Tag Team Championship.)
B1	Amboss (Icarus and Robert Dreissker)	17:48

== 2023 ==
The 2023 edition of the tournament took place between September 22 and 24 in Oberhausen, Germany.

First rounds (September 22, 2023)
Cash & Hektor (Dennis Dullnig and Hektor Invictus)	Pin
Maggot and Psycho Mike	17:15
Y2Kuties (Aaron Rourke, Ava Everett and Jacob Crane)	17:15
Jurn Simmons and Levaniel	Pin
Only Friends (Bobby Gunns and Michael Knight)	Pin (Note: This match was also disputed for Gunns and Knight's wXw World Tag Team Championship.)
Rott Und Flott (Michael Schenkenberg and Nikita Charisma)	10:38
Los Vipers (Arez and Látigo)	10:37
Amboss (Laurance Roman and Robert Dreissker)	Pin
Astronauts (Fuminori Abe and Takuya Nomura)	Pin
The Second Gear Crew (1 Called Manders and Mance Warner)	12:48
Frenchadors (Aigle Blanc and Senza Volto)	16:41
Renegades (Mizuki Watase and Shigehiro Irie)	Pin

Semifinals (September 23, 2023)
Cash & Hektor (Dennis Dullnig and Hektor Invictus)	Pin
Jurn Simmons and Levaniel	9:51
Only Friends (Bobby Gunns and Michael Knight)	Pin (Note: This match was also disputed for Gunns and Knight's wXw World Tag Team Championship.)
Amboss (Laurance Roman and Robert Dreissker)	11:20
Astronauts (Fuminori Abe and Takuya Nomura)	16:14
Renegades (Mizuki Watase and Shigehiro Irie)	Pin

Finals (September 24, 2023)
Cash & Hektor (Dennis Dullnig and Hektor Invictus)	Pin
Amboss (Laurance Roman and Robert Dreissker)	23:13
Renegades (Mizuki Watase and Shigehiro Irie)	—

== 2024 ==
The 2024 edition of the tournament took place between October 4 and 6 in Oberhausen, Germany.

First rounds (October 4, 2024)
Young Blood (Oskar Leube and Yuto Nakashima)	Pin
Elijah Blum and LSG	9:41
Y2Kuties (Ava Everett and Jacob Crane)	7:18
High Performer Ltd. (Icarus and Joseph Fenech Jr.)	Pin
Los Desperados (Arez and Gringo Loco)	Pin
Lykos Gym (Kid Lykos and Kid Lykos II)	17:24
Cash & Hektor (Dennis Dullnig and Hektor Invictus)	10:20
KXS (Axel Tischer and Fast Time Moodo)	Pin (Note: This match was also disputed for Dullnig and Invictus' wXw World Tag Team Championship.)
Fuminori Abe and Shigehiro Irie	Pin
Bobby Gunns and Stephanie Maze	12:12
Real (Hideki Suzuki and Timothy Thatcher)	22:57
1 Called Manders and Thomas Shire	Pin

Semifinals (October 5, 2024)
Young Blood (Oskar Leube and Yuto Nakashima)	Pin
High Performer Ltd. (Icarus and Joseph Fenech Jr.)	10:25
Los Desperados (Arez and Gringo Loco)	9:19
KXS (Axel Tischer and Fast Time Moodo)	Pin (Note: This match was also disputed for Tischer and Moodo's wXw World Tag Team Championship.)
Fuminori Abe and Shigehiro Irie	13:21
1 Called Manders and Thomas Shire	Pin

Finals (October 6, 2024)
Young Blood (Oskar Leube and Yuto Nakashima)	Pin (Note: This match was also disputed for Tischer and Moodo's wXw World Tag Team Championship.)
KXS (Axel Tischer and Fast Time Moodo)	20:33
1 Called Manders and Thomas Shire	—

== 2025 ==
Quarterfinals
Greedy Souls (Brendan White and Danny Jones)	Pin
Dragon Dia and Dragon Kid	12:34
The Gulyas Bros (Atilla Gulyas and Vilmos Gulyas)	Pin
Violence is Forever (Dominic Garrini and Kevin Ku)	11:36
The Grind (Laurance Roman and Nick Schreier)	17:04
KxS (Axel Tischer and Fast Time Moodo)	Pin
Hype Dawgs (Kuro and Mecca)	10:34
Planet Gojirah (Marc Empire and Robert Dreissker)	Pin

Semifinals
Greedy Souls (Brendan White and Danny Jones)	Pin
Violence is Forever (Dominic Garrini and Kevin Ku)	11:01
The Grind (Laurance Roman and Nick Schreier)	Pin
Planet Gojirah (Marc Empire and Robert Dreissker)	13:08

Finals
Greedy Souls (Brendan White and Danny Jones)	Pin
The Grind (Laurance Roman and Nick Schreier)	15:29

== 2026 ==
Quarterfinals
Greedy Souls (Brendan White and Danny Jones)	Pin
Quick And Dirty (Hugo Brand and Niklas Bock)	7:33
10/10 Next Level (Aleksander Bellamy and Alex Duke)	11:20
The Grind (Laurance Roman and Nick Schreier)	Pin
Planet Gojirah (Robert Dreissker and Marc Empire)	Pin
Better Together (Hadar Horvitz and Ori Gold)	10:00
BestBros (Baliyan Akki and Mei Suruga)	13:17
Hyperactive (Anita Vaughan and Safire Reed)	Pin

Semifinals
Greedy Souls (Brendan White and Danny Jones)	Pin
The Grind (Laurance Roman and Nick Schreier)	17:02
N/A (Note: Planet Gojirah forfeited their semifinal match against Hyperactive after Marc Empire suffered an injury, thus giving Hyperactive a bye to the finals.)	–
Hyperactive (Anita Vaughan and Safire Reed)	Bye

Finals
Greedy Souls (Brendan White and Danny Jones)	Pin
Hyperactive (Anita Vaughan and Safire Reed))	N/A
