= Rhett Titus =

American professional wrestler (born 1987)

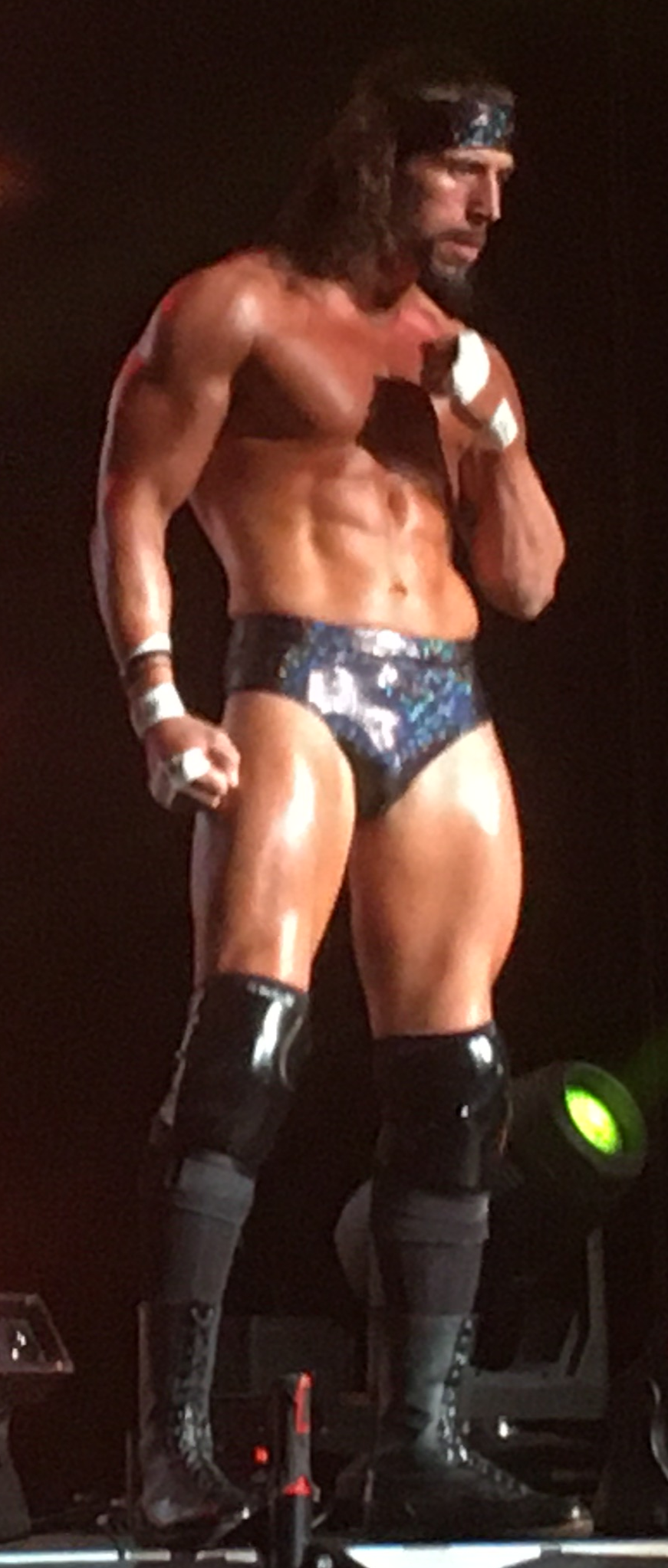
- Titus in 2019

Personal information
- Born: Everett Lawrence Titus; September 15, 1987 (age 39) Ocean City, Maryland, U.S.

Professional wrestling career
- Ring name(s): Rhett Titus; The Romantic Touch
- Billed height: 6 ft 2 in (188 cm)
- Billed weight: 230 lb (104 kg)
- Billed from: "The Temple of Lust/Desire" off Long Beach Island, New Jersey "Lovers' Township, New Jersey"; Long Beach Island, New Jersey
- Trained by: Austin Aries; Bryan Danielson
- Debut: 2006

Everett Lawrence Titus (born September 15, 1987) is an American professional wrestler. He currently performs on the independent circuit. He is best known for his time in Full Impact Pro (FIP) and Ring of Honor (ROH).

He began his training in the ROH Wrestling Academy, where he won the ROH Top of the Class Trophy. He would work for ROH from 2006 until 2022. He began under the character of Addicted to Love, but later he created the team All Night Express with Kenny King, winning the ROH World Tag Team Championship. The team disbanded when King left ROH and worked as singles wrestler, sometimes as The Romantic Touch masked character. He won the ROH Tag Team Championship one more time with Tracy Williams and the ROH World Television Championship, until he left ROH after the promotion was bought by Tony Khan.

== Early life ==
Raised in Lacey Township, New Jersey, Titus played prep football at Lacey Township High School, graduating in 2005.

== Professional wrestling career ==
=== Training ===
Titus began training at the ROH Wrestling Academy with Austin Aries at the age of 17, and was later trained by Bryan Danielson at the academy. He was one of only two people in his class, the other being Mitch Franklin. Titus later said that he "hated training with Bryan" at the time, but was grateful for it later as it made him "a more dedicated wrestler".

=== Full Impact Pro (2006–2010) ===
Titus debuted for Full Impact Pro (FIP) in November 2006. In his first match on November 10 at All or Nothing, Titus and Alex Payne lost a tag team match to the YRR (Steve Madison and Chasyn Rance). His second match, the following day at Evening the Odds 2006, saw him and Payne win a tag team match against The Heartbreak Express by disqualification. In his next appearances, in late 2008, Titus began a feud with Grizzly Redwood, which culminated in a six-man tag team match between the team of Redwood and the Loggers, and Titus and The Heartbreak Assassins at Unstoppable 2008.

Titus won the FIP Florida Heritage Championship on March 28, 2009, by defeating Chris Jones. He successfully defended the championship against Jones on May 2, and Brad Attitude on August 1 at Heatstroke '09. He lost the championship to Attitude on October 3 at Fallout 2009, after holding the championship for just over six months. Titus' last appearance in FIP was at Southern Stampede on April 17, 2010, when he competed in a battle royal, before defeating Bruce Santee in a singles match later that night.

=== Independent circuit (2006–present) ===
In February 2008, Titus took part in Chikara's King of Trios tournament alongside Shane Hagadorne and Alex Payne, losing to Las Chivas Rayadas (Chiva II, Chiva III, and Chiva IV) in the first round.

On July 8, 2013, Titus appeared as an extra in a backstage segment on WWE Raw, dressed in a suit in the background during a segment involving Brad Maddox and Vickie Guerrero. Titus then appeared 2 years later on SmackDown getting quickly defeated in a Tag Team match by The Ascension.

Titus also began appearing for Jersey Championship Wrestling (JCW) in 2014. On March 28, he and Joey Janela entered a tournament for the vacant JCW Tag Team Championship. They defeated Jarrett Foster and Steve Sterling in the preliminaries, Ken Doane and Mike Mondo in the semifinals, and Chris Dickinson and Aaron Epic in the finals to win the titles.

=== Ring of Honor ===
==== Debut and storyline with Delirious (2006–2008) ====
Titus debuted for Ring of Honor (ROH) in 2006, and competed in dark matches for the company for several months, wrestling against people including Chad Collyer, Ernie Osiris, and Bobby Dempsey. His first match on the main card for ROH was at Glory By Honor V Night 1 on September 15, when he teamed with Pelle Primeau in a loss to The Ring Crew Express. Most of Titus' matches in ROH up until 2008 were dark matches, with the only exception being at Caged Rage on August 24, 2007, when he lost to Jimmy Jacobs. Titus went on to win the ROH Top of the Class Trophy from Ernie Osiris in a dark match at the Respect is Earned II pay-per-view on June 7, 2008. Titus was the last holder of the Trophy, as ROH stopped recognizing it as an official championship in October 2008.

In mid-2008, Titus began a feud with Delirious over female wrestler Daizee Haze. Both men attempted to get a date with Haze, and Titus began training with Delirious and Haze. Shortly afterwards, Titus claimed to have had sex with Haze and to have recorded it on his mobile phone. This led to a series of matches with Delirious, with Delirious coming out as the winner. He later had Haze's face airbrushed onto his wrestling tights. At Age of Insanity on August 15, Delirious joined The Age of the Fall faction, and defeated Titus after the referee stopped the match. His feud with Delirious came to an end at the Rising Above pay-per-view, when Delirious defeated him in a grudge match. Titus later said that this feud was the favorite of his career. His storyline with Haze came to an end at Southern Hostility on December 6, when Haze confronted Titus about his claims, and she and the Necro Butcher forced Titus to admit that he had been lying, and that he was, in storyline, a virgin.

==== The All-Night Express and S.C.U.M. (2009–2013) ====
In early 2009, Titus began teaming with Kenny King as the All-Night Express. In March 2009, Titus and King formed an alliance with Austin Aries, interfering in his matches and attacking wrestlers on his behalf. On December 18 at Final Battle 2010 the All Night Express defeated Adam Cole and Kyle O'Reilly, announcing their intention of becoming ROH World Tag Team Champions in 2011. On February 26, 2011, at 9th Anniversary Show, Titus and King failed in their first attempt to win the ROH World Tag Team Championship, when they were defeated by The Kings of Wrestling (Chris Hero and Claudio Castagnoli).

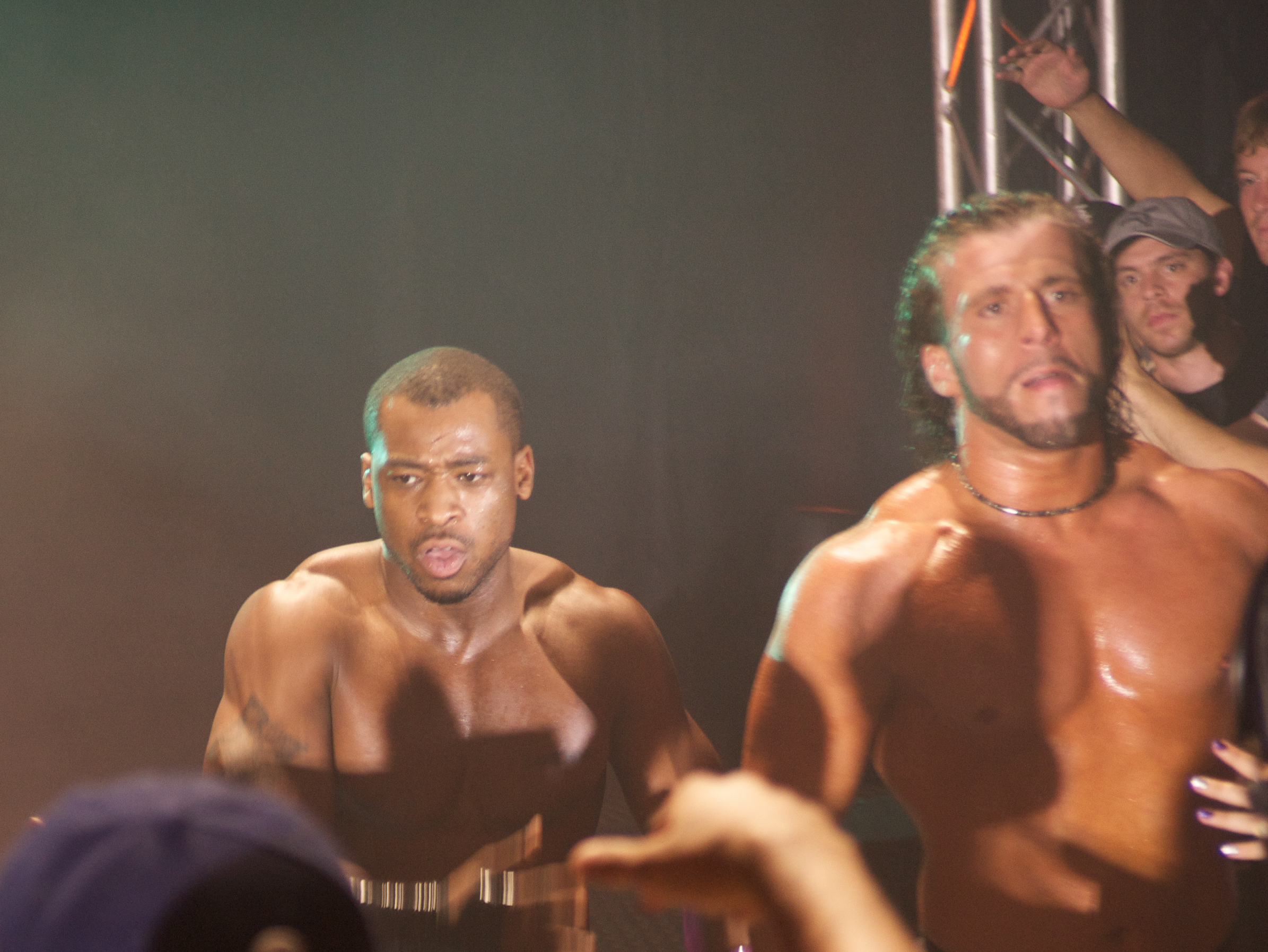
The All-Night Express: Kenny King (left) and Titus (right) in 2011

During the program with the Kings of Wrestling, Titus and King showed signs of a face turn and finalized their turn on March 19 at Manhattan Mayhem IV, after defeating the Briscoe Brothers (Jay and Mark). On April 6, Ring of Honor announced that Titus had signed a new contract with the promotion. On September 17 at Death Before Dishonor IX, the All Night Express defeated the Briscoe Brothers in a ladder match to become the number one contenders to the ROH World Tag Team Championship. On June 24 at Best in the World 2012: Hostage Crisis, Titus and King defeated Wrestling's Greatest Tag Team (Charlie Haas and Shelton Benjamin) to win the ROH World Tag Team Championship for the first time.

On July 10, 2012, Titus was officially stripped of the ROH World Tag Team Championship from The All Night Express due to the departure of Kenny King, ending their reign at 16 days. Titus then attempted to regain the title by entering a tournament with rival Charlie Haas. The team made it all the way to the finals, before losing to S.C.U.M. (Jimmy Jacobs and Steve Corino) on September 15 at Death Before Dishonor X: State of Emergency. On September 22, Titus unsuccessfully challenged Kevin Steen for the ROH World Championship.

On March 2, 2013, at the 11th Anniversary Show, Titus, Cliff Compton, Jimmy Rave and Matt Hardy, revealed themselves as the newest members of S.C.U.M. by attacking numerous members of the ROH roster following the main event, joining Kevin Steen, Jimmy Jacobs, Rhino and Steve Corino as members of the group. On June 23, S.C.U.M. was forced to disband, after being defeated by Team ROH in a Steel Cage Warfare match.

==== The Romantic Touch and The Cabinet/The Rebellion (2013–2017) ====
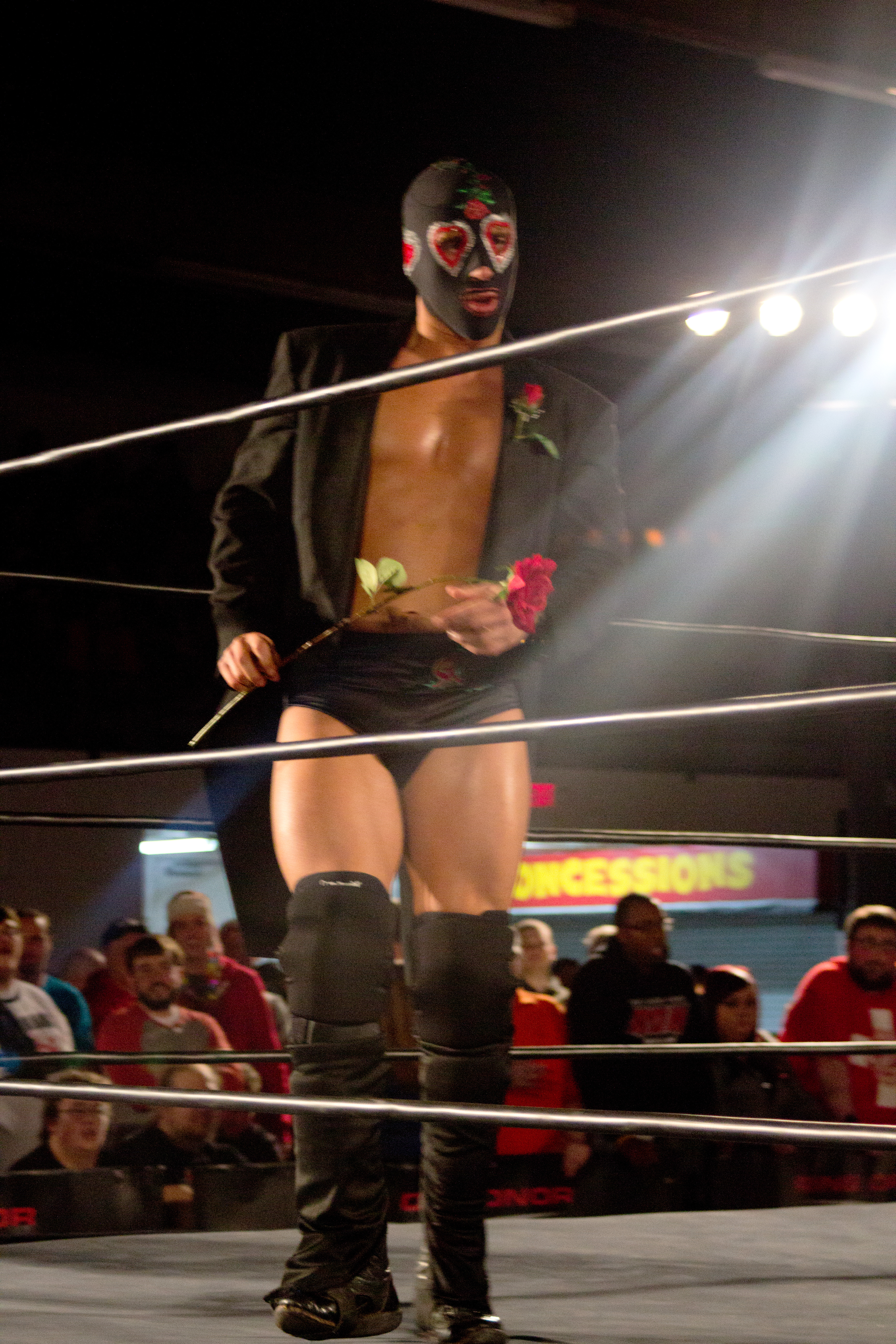
Titus as The Romantic Touch in January 2014

Titus returned to ROH on October 26, 2013, working under a mask and the ring name "The Romantic Touch", defeating Will Ferarra in a dark match prior to Glory By Honor XII. On September 18, 2015, Titus dropped the Romantic Touch persona, reuniting with the returning Kenny King as The All Night Express to defeat the Briscoe Brothers in a tag team match at All Star Extravaganza VII.

Titus teamed with Caprice Coleman and Kenny King to form the Cabinet. The Cabinet defeated Jason Kincaid, Leon St. Giovanni and Shaheem Ali in the first round of the ROH World Six-Man Tag Team Championship. The Cabinet was defeated by A. C. H., Jay White and Kushida. The Cabinet was originally portrayed as something not be taken seriously, but in late 2016, the trio turned serious and renamed themselves "The Rebellion", eventually also adding Shane Taylor as a member. The Rebellion remained together until June 2017, when they were defeated by Search and Destroy in a match, where the losing team had to disband.

==== The Dawgs, gimmick change and The Foundation (2017–2022) ====
Following the dissolution of the Rebellion, Titus formed a new tag team named "The Dawgs" with Will Ferrara in late 2017.

By early 2019, Titus and Ferrara quietly split up their team. Titus then started a new gimmick reminiscent of Rick Rude and Lex Luger, showing off his body by constantly flexing.

On the November 28, 2020 episode of Ring of Honor Wrestling, Titus appeared with newly formed faction The Foundation (Jonathan Gresham, Jay Lethal & Tracy Williams) while donning a red octopus mask.

== Championships and accomplishments ==
- Fight Pro
  - FIGHTT Pro Premier Hybrid Division Championship (1 time)
- Full Impact Pro
  - FIP Florida Heritage Championship (1 time)
- Impact Championship Wrestling
  - ICW Tag Team Championship (1 time) – with Matt Taven
- Jersey Championship Wrestling
  - JCW Tag Team Championship (1 time) - with Joey Janela
- MCW Pro Wrestling
  - MCW Heavyweight Championship (1 time)
- National Wrestling Superstars
  - NWS Jersey Shore Championship (1 time)
  - NWS Jersey Junior Heavyweight Championship (1 time)
  - Chris Candido Memorial J-Cup Tournament (2008)
  - WSU/NWS King and Queen of the Ring (2008) – with Nikki Roxx
- Pro Wrestling Illustrated
  - Ranked No. 98 of the top 500 singles wrestlers in the PWI 500 in 2012
- Ring of Honor
  - ROH World Television Championship (1 time)
  - ROH World Tag Team Championship (2 times) – with Kenny King (1), and Tracy Williams (1)
  - ROH Top of the Class Trophy Championship (1 time, final)
  - ROH Year-End Award (1 time)
    - Faction of the Year (2020) – with The Foundation (Jay Lethal, Jonathan Gresham, & Tracy Williams)
- United Elite Wrestling
  - UEW Heavyweight Championship (1 time)
- WildKat Sports
  - Revolution Rumble (2022)
