= DPW =

DPW may refer to:

- Deadlock Pro-Wrestling, an American professional wrestling federation
- Democratic Party of Wisconsin
- Department of Public Works, alternately Public Works Department
- Disney Publishing Worldwide

See also

- Davis Polk & Wardwell, a law firm (commonly known as Davis Polk)
- DP World, formerly Dubai Ports World, originally Dubai Ports International
