= Jersey J-Cup =

Professional wrestling tournament

- Promotions: Jersey Championship Wrestling/Game Changer Wrestling (2000–2004, 2014, 2023–present); National Wrestling Superstars (2005–2012)
- First event: 2000
- Event gimmick: Single elimination tournament for junior heavyweight wrestlers

The Jersey J-Cup, also known as the Chris Candido Memorial J-Cup Tournament, is an annual professional wrestling tournament held in New Jersey, typically in February. Modeled after New Japan Pro-Wrestling's Super J-Cup, it is the second-oldest active independent wrestling tournament in United States after the East Coast Wrestling Association's Super 8 Tournament.

The wrestlers in the tournament are typically junior heavyweight wrestlers from independent promotions all over North America. The tournament was initially hosted by New Jersey–based Jersey Championship Wrestling (JCW) and National Wrestling Superstars (NWS). The tournament was revived by JCW in 2014 before becoming inactive again after the promotion was renamed to Game Changer Wrestling (GCW). JCW and NWS held a combined fourteen J-Cup tournaments. No wrestler ever won the tournament twice during the JCW and NWS years, however, a number of participants did enter the tournament multiple times. Devon Moore was the wrestler who participated in the most J-Cups during its initial existence as he wrestled in all NWS-promoted tournaments except the 2007 tournament.

In 2023, GCW brought back the Jersey J-Cup, holding the tournament to determine the inaugural holder of the JCW World Championship.

== History and format ==
The tournament was first held in 2000 by Jersey Championship Wrestling (JCW). It was originally created by JCW's founder Ricky Otazu, inspired by the success of the Super 8 Tournament, as an American counterpart to New Japan Pro-Wrestling's Super J-Cup. The Jersey J-Cup was intended to showcase the top independent wrestlers in the United States and North America. The tournament was regularly hosted by JCW until its close in 2004 whereupon it was taken over by National Wrestling Superstars (NWS).

In 2005, shortly after purchasing the rights to the Jersey J-Cup, NWS promoter Joe Panzarino announced that the tournament would be renamed the Chris Candido Memorial J-Cup Tournament, and the J-Cup itself renamed to the Chris Candido Memorial J-Cup Trophy. Subsequently, the tournament was changed with the opening rounds consisting of three-way elimination matches to reduce the duration of the event while keeping the same number of competitors.

In 2006, NWS began hosting a separate tournament for female wrestlers called the J-Cup Tournament, which NWS would begin co-promoting with Women Superstars Uncensored (WSU) in 2008. NWS co-promoted the tournament until 2010 when it became exclusive to WSU. In 2007, NWS also began hosting a separate tournament for tag teams called the J-Cup Tag Team Tournament, which was renamed as the Lou Albano Memorial J-Cup Tag Team Tournament in 2010 as a tribute to Captain Lou Albano.

NWS closed in 2012 and JCW was reinstated in 2013. JCW revived the Jersey J-Cup in 2014 before the promotion was revamped as Game Changer Wrestling (GCW) in 2015. GCW revived the Jersey J-Cup in 2023 to crown the inaugural JCW World Champion.

== Tournament winners ==
Tournament	Year	Venue	Location	Winner	Total won	Refs
J-Cup I	2000	Paramus High School	Paramus, New Jersey	Judas Young	1	
J-Cup II	2001	JCW Arena	Lodi, New Jersey	Low Ki	1	
J-Cup III	2002	Rex Plex	Elizabeth, New Jersey	Reckless Youth	1	
J-Cup IV	2003	Garfield Boys and Girls Club	Garfield, New Jersey	Jay Lethal	1	
J-Cup V	2004	Garfield Boys and Girls Club	Garfield, New Jersey	Super Dragon	1	
J-Cup VI	2005	Recreation Station Arena	Toms River, New Jersey	Mike Kruel	1	
J-Cup VII	2006	Manville VFW Hall	Manville, New Jersey	Grim Reefer	1	
J-Cup VIII	2007	Manville VFW Hall	Manville, New Jersey	Deranged	1	
J-Cup IX	2008	Manville VFW Hall	Manville, New Jersey	Rhett Titus	1	
J-Cup X	2009	Manville VFW Hall	Manville, New Jersey	Myke Quest	1	
J-Cup XI	2010	Veterans Center	Kenilworth, New Jersey	R. J. Brewer	1	
J-Cup XII	2011	New Point Comfort Fire Company Hall	Keansburg, New Jersey	Nicky Oceans	1	
J-Cup XII	2012	Knights of Columbus	Belleville, New Jersey	Devon Moore	1	
J-Cup XIV	2014	Manville VFW Hall	Manville, New Jersey	Chris Dickinson	1	
J-Cup XV	2023	White Eagle Hall	Jersey City, New Jersey	Jordan Oliver	1	
J-Cup XVI	2024	White Eagle Hall	Jersey City, New Jersey	Masha Slamovich	1	
J-Cup XVII	2025	White Eagle Hall	Jersey City, New Jersey	Masha Slamovich	2	
J-Cup XVIII	2026	White Eagle Hall	Jersey City, New Jersey	Charles Mason	1	

== Events ==
=== 2000 ===
The 2000 JCW Jersey J-Cup was a two-block, 16-man tournament held on May 12, 2000, at Paramus High School in Paramus, New Jersey. Wrestlers from seven promotions, including Jersey Championship Wrestling, were represented at the inaugural tournament including the CyberSpace Wrestling Federation, East Coast Pro Wrestling, Jersey All Pro Wrestling, NWA New York, Outlaws of Wrestling and World Xtreme Wrestling.

Judas Young won the tournament by winning four matches at the event. Over the course of the evening, he defeated Homicide in the opening round, Crazy Ivan in the quarter-finals, Low Ki in the semi-finals and Ryan Wing in the final match. Ryan Wing, hometown hero and favorite to win the tournament, made a surprise "heel turn" arrogantly criticizing the fans and brought out his "mother", Mrs. Wing, to be in his corner during his match against Judas Young. It was a failed attempt at outside interference, an ill-timed slap that accidentally hit her son, that allowed Young to pin Wing with a schoolboy rollup for the win.

Results

May 12, 2000 in Paramus, New Jersey (Paramus High School)

#	Results	Stipulations	Times
1	Crazy Ivan (JCW) defeated "Sterling" Rick Silver (NWA-NY)	First Round Tournament match	n/a
2	"Smooth" Tommy Suede (WXW) defeated Marc Reil (JAPW)	First Round Tournament match	n/a
3	Judas Young (JCW) defeated Homicide (JAPW)	First Round Tournament match	n/a
4	"Sure Thing" Ryan Wing (JCW) defeated Dave Delicious (CWF)	First Round Tournament match	n/a
5	Billy Reil (JCW) defeated "Superstar" Dave Grecco (JCW)	First Round Tournament match	n/a
6	Embassamador (ECPW) defeated Zero Gravity (WXW)	First Round Tournament match	n/a
7	Low Ki (JCW) defeated Grandmaster B (ECPW)	First Round Tournament match	n/a
8	Abunai (JCW) defeated White Lotus (OOW)	First Round Tournament match	n/a
9	Judas Young defeated Crazy Ivan	Quarter Final Tournament Match	n/a
10	Ryan Wing defeated Tommy Suede	Quarter Final Tournament Match	n/a
11	Low Ki defeated Billy Reil	Quarter Final Tournament Match	n/a
12	Abunai defeated Embassamador	Quarter Final Tournament Match	n/a
13	Judas Young defeated Low Ki	Semi Final Tournament match	n/a
14	Ryan Wing defeated Abunai	Semi Final Tournament match	n/a
15	Judas Young defeated Ryan Wing (with Mrs. Wing)	Tournament Finals match	n/a

Tournament bracket

Pin-Pinfall; Sub-Submission; CO-Countout; DCO-Double countout; DQ-Disqualification; Ref-Referee's decision

First round
Crazy Ivan
Rick Silver	Pin
Judas Young
Homicide	Pin
Billy Reil
Dave Grecco	Pin
Low Ki
Grandmaster B	Pin
Tommy Suede
Marc Reil	Pin
Ryan Wing
Dave Delicious	Pin
Embassamador
Zero Gravity	Pin
Abunai
White Lotus	Pin

Quarterfinals
Crazy Ivan
Judas Young	Pin
Billy Reil
Low Ki	Pin
Tommy Suede
Ryan Wing	Sub
Embassamador
Abunai	Pin

Semi-finals
Judas Young
Low Ki	Pin
Ryan Wing
Abunai	Pin

Final
Judas Young
Ryan Wing	Pin

=== 2001 ===
The 2001 JCW Jersey J-Cup was a two-block, 16-man tournament held on June 23, 2001, at the JCW Arena in Lodi, New Jersey. Wrestlers from nine promotions, including Jersey Championship Wrestling, were represented at the tournament including the CyberSpace Wrestling Federation, Eastern Wrestling Federation, Heartland Wrestling Association, Jersey All Pro Wrestling, Maryland Championship Wrestling, Outlaws of Wrestling, Ultimate Championship Wrestling and World Xtreme Wrestling.

Low Ki won the tournament by winning four matches at the event. Over the course of the evening, he defeated Xavier in the opening round, Joel Maximo in the quarter-finals, Shark Boy in the semi-finals and Queenan Creed in the final match. In addition to the tournament, a special challenge match was held as one of the two semi-main events pitting former Extreme Championship Wrestling wrestler Julio Dinero against Rick Ratchet who mas making his in-ring return after being out of action for six months due to an injury.

Results

June 23, 2001 in Lodi, New Jersey (JCW Arena)

#	Results	Stipulations	Times
1	Judas Young (JCW) defeated Ryan Wing (CWF)	First Round Tournament match	n/a
2	Low Ki (JCW) defeated Xavier (UCW)	First Round Tournament match	n/a
3	"Superstar" Dave Greco (JCW) defeated Supreme Lee Great (WXW)	First Round Tournament match	n/a
4	Joel Maximo (UCW) defeated Jose Maximo (UCW)	First Round Tournament match	n/a
5	Dixie (JAPW) defeated Felipe the Pool Boy (JCW)	First Round Tournament match	n/a
6	Shark Boy (HWA) defeated Dylan Cage (JCW)	First Round Tournament match	n/a
7	Queenan Creed (MCW) defeated White Lotus (OOW)	First Round Tournament match	n/a
8	Mike Quackenbush (EWF) defeated Red (UCW)	First Round Tournament match	n/a
9	Shark Boy defeated Judas Young	Quarter Final Tournament Match	n/a
10	Low Ki defeated Joel Maximo	Quarter Final Tournament Match	n/a
11	Mike Quackenbush defeated Dave Greco	Quarter Final Tournament Match	n/a
12	Queenan Creed defeated Dixie	Quarter Final Tournament Match	n/a
13	Low Ki defeated Shark Boy	Semi Final Tournament match	n/a
14	Queenan Creed defeated Mike Quackenbush	Semi Final Tournament match	n/a
15	Julio Dinero defeat Rik Ratchet	Special Challenge match	n/a
16	Low Ki defeated Queenan Creed	Tournament Finals match	n/a

Tournament bracket

Pin-Pinfall; Sub-Submission; CO-Countout; DCO-Double countout; DQ-Disqualification; Ref-Referee's decision

First round
Judas Young
Ryan Wing	Pin
Shark Boy
Dylan Cage	Pin
Low Ki
Xavier	Sub
Joel Maximo
Jose Maximo	Pin
Dave Greco
Supreme Lee Great	Pin
Mike Quackenbush
Red	Pin
Dixie
Felipe the Pool Boy	Pin
Queenan Creed
White Lotus	Pin

Quarterfinals
Judas Young
Shark Boy	Pin
Low Ki
Joel Maximo	Sub
Dave Greco
Mike Quackenbush	Pin
Dixie
Queenan Creed	Pin

Semi-finals
Low Ki
Shark Boy	Sub
Mike Quackenbush
Queenan Creed	Pin

Final
Low Ki
Queenan Creed	Sub

=== 2002 ===
The 2002 JCW Jersey J-Cup was a two-block, 16-man tournament held on June 15, 2002, at the Rex Plex in Elizabeth, New Jersey. Wrestlers from fourteen promotions, including Jersey Championship Wrestling, were represented at the tournament including Chikara, the East Coast Wrestling Association, Impact Championship Wrestling, IPW Hardcore, IWA Mid-South, Jersey All Pro Wrestling, Maryland Championship Wrestling, NWA New England, Ring of Honor, 3PW, USA Pro Wrestling, World Wrestling All-Stars and World Xtreme Wrestling.

Reckless Youth won the tournament by winning four matches at the event. Over the course of the evening, he defeated The Insane Dragon in the opening round, CM Punk in the quarter-finals, AJ Styles in the semi-finals and American Dragon in the final match. In addition to the tournament, a singles match between Inferno and Jay Briscoe was held as one of the two semi-main events.

Results

June 15, 2002 in Elizabeth, New Jersey (Rex Plex)

#	Results	Stipulations	Times'
1	American Dragon (ROH) defeated Supreme Lee Great (WXW)	First Round Tournament match	n/a
2	Dave Greco (JCW) defeated Dixie (JAPW)	First Round Tournament match	n/a
3	Mark Briscoe (JCW) defeated Shawn Sheridan	First Round Tournament match	n/a
4	Scoot Andrews (ECWA) defeated Jason Rumble (NWA-NE)	First Round Tournament match	n/a
5	Colt Cabana (IWA-MS) defeated Damian Dragon (ICW)	First Round Tournament match	n/a
6	A.J. Styles (WWA) defeated Qenaan Creed (MCW)	First Round Tournament match	n/a
7	CM Punk (3PW) defeated Billy Reil (USAPW)	First Round Tournament match	n/a
8	Reckless Youth (CHIKARA) defeated The Insane Dragon (JAPW)	First Round Tournament match	n/a
9	American Dragon defeated Dave Greco	Quarter Final Tournament Match	n/a
10	Scoot Andrews defeated Mark Briscoe	Quarter Final Tournament Match	n/a
11	A.J. Styles defeated Colt Cabana	Quarter Final Tournament Match	n/a
12	Reckless Youth defeated CM Punk	Quarter Final Tournament Match	n/a
13	American Dragon defeated Scoot Andrews	Semi Final Tournament match	n/a
14	Reckless Youth defeated AJ Styles	Semi Final Tournament match	n/a
15	Inferno defeated Jay Briscoe		n/a
16	Reckless Youth defeated American Dragon	Tournament Finals match	n/a

Tournament bracket

Pin-Pinfall; Sub-Submission; CO-Countout; DCO-Double countout; DQ-Disqualification; Ref-Referee's decision

First round
American Dragon
Supreme Lee Great
Dave Greco
Dixie
Mark Briscoe
Shawn Sheridan
Scoot Andrews
Jason Rumble
Colt Cabana
Damian Dragon
A.J. Styles
Qenaan Creed
CM Punk
Billy Reil
Reckless Youth
The Insane Dragon

Quarterfinals
American Dragon
Dave Greco
Mark Briscoe
Scoot Andrews
Colt Cabana
AJ Styles
CM Punk
Reckless Youth

Semi-finals
American Dragon
Scoot Andrews
Reckless Youth
AJ Styles

Final
American Dragon
Reckless Youth

=== 2003 ===
The 2003 JCW Jersey J-Cup was a two-block, 16-man tournament held on August 24, 2003, at the Garfield Boys and Girls Club in Garfield, New Jersey. Wrestlers from several promotions, including Jersey Championship Wrestling, were represented at the tournament including Combat Zone Wrestling, IWA Mid-South, Jersey All Pro Wrestling and the New York Wrestling Connection .

Jay Lethal won the tournament by winning four matches at the event. Over the course of the evening, he defeated Rob Eckos in the opening round, CM Punk in the quarter-finals, Jimmy Jacobs in the semi-finals and Homicide in the final match. In addition to the tournament, a singles match between Striker and Jonny Storm was held as one of the two semi-main events. The tournament also opened with a tag team match for the JCW Tag Team Championship between the champions, Los Boricuas, and the challengers, The Disciples Of Darling, in which Los Boricuas retained the championship via disqualification.

Results

August 24, 2003 in Garfield, New Jersey (Garfield Boys and Girls Club)

#	Results	Stipulations	Times
1	Los Boricuas (Warpath and Tony Blaze) (c) defeated The Disciples Of Darling (Kimani and Jason Static) (with John Shane) via disqualification.	Tag Team match for the JCW Tag Team Championship	n/a
2	Jay Lethal defeated Rob Eckos	First Round Tournament match	n/a
3	CM Punk defeated Sonjay Dutt (CZW)	First Round Tournament match	n/a
4	Shawn Sheridan (JCW) defeated Deranged	First Round Tournament match	n/a
5	Jimmy Jacobs (IWA-MS) defeated Dixie (JAPW)	First Round Tournament match	n/a
6	Homicide defeated Grim Reefer	First Round Tournament match	n/a
7	Johnny Ova (NYWC) defeated Dan Barry (NYWC)	First Round Tournament match	n/a
8	Alex Shelley (IWA-MS) defeated Ruckus (CZW)	First Round Tournament match	n/a
9	Slyk Wagner Brown (with April Hunter) defeated Dave Greco (JCW)	First Round Tournament match	n/a
10	Jay Lethal defeated CM Punk	Quarter Final Tournament Match	n/a
11	Jimmy Jacobs defeated Shawn Sheridan	Quarter Final Tournament Match	n/a
12	Homicide defeated Alex Shelley	Quarter Final Tournament Match	n/a
13	Slyk Wagner Brown (with April Hunter) defeated Johnny Ova	Quarter Final Tournament Match	n/a
14	Jay Lethal defeated Jimmy Jacobs	Semi Final Tournament match	n/a
15	Homicide defeated Slyk Wagner Brown (with April Hunter)	Semi Final Tournament match	n/a
16	Striker defeated Jonny Storm (with John Shane)	Singles match	n/a
17	Jay Lethal defeated Homicide	Tournament Finals match	n/a

Tournament bracket

Pin-Pinfall; Sub-Submission; CO-Countout; DCO-Double countout; DQ-Disqualification; Ref-Referee's decision

First round
Jay Lethal
Rob Eckos	Pin
CM Punk
Sonjay Dutt	Pin
Shawn Sheridan
Deranged	Pin
Jimmy Jacobs
Dixie	Pin
Homicide
Grim Reefer	Pin
Alex Shelley
Ruckus	Pin
Johnny Ova
Dan Barry	Pin
Slyk Wagner Brown
Dave Greco	Pin

Quarterfinals
Jay Lethal
CM Punk	Sub
Shawn Sheridan
Jimmy Jacobs	Pin
Homicide
Alex Shelley	Pin
Johnny Ova
Slyk Wagner Brown	Pin

Semi-finals
Jay Lethal
Jimmy Jacobs	Pin
Homicide
Slyk Wagner Brown	Pin

Final
Jay Lethal
Homicide	Pin

=== 2004 ===
The 2004 JCW Jersey J-Cup was a two-block, 16-man tournament held on June 27, 2004, at the Garfield Boys and Girls Club in Garfield, New Jersey. Wrestlers from nine promotions, including Jersey Championship Wrestling, were represented at the tournament including the Combat Zone Wrestling, East Coast Wrestling Association, Full Impact Pro, Lucha Xtreme Wrestling, New York Wrestling Connection, 3PW and Zero-1.

Super Dragon won the tournament by winning four matches at the event. Over the course of the evening, he defeated Altar Boy Luke in the opening round, Shawn Sheridan in the quarter-finals, M-Dogg 20 in the semi-finals and B-Boy in the final match; Super Dragon was also awarded the vacant JCW Light Heavyweight Championship. In addition to the tournament, the semi-main event was a standard wrestling match for the JCW Heavyweight Championship between the champion, Slyk Wagner Brown, and the challenger, Homicide, in which Homicide won the championship.

Results

June 27, 2004 in Garfield, New Jersey (Garfield Boys and Girls Club)

#	Results	Stipulations	Times
1	Dave Greco (JCW) defeated Damian Adams (3PW)	First Round Tournament match	7:30
2	Mike Quackenbush (CHIKARA) defeated Jigsaw (CHIKARA)	First Round Tournament match	7:40
3	M-Dogg 20 defeated Rob Eckos (ECWA)	First Round Tournament match	5:02
4	Striker (NYWC) defeated Dan Barry	First Round Tournament match	9:04
5	Shawn Sheridan (JCW) defeated Sabian (CZW)	First Round Tournament match	5:57
6	Super Dragon defeated Altar Boy Luke (LXW)	First Round Tournament match	8:54
7	Josh Daniels (Zero-1) defeated Tyler Payne (NYWC)	First Round Tournament match	10:01
8	B-Boy (CZW) defeated Chris Idol	First Round Tournament match	7:51
9	M-Dogg 20 defeated Dave Greco	Quarter Final Tournament Match	9:19
10	B-Boy defeated Mike Quackenbush	Quarter Final Tournament Match	12:21
11	Super Dragon defeated Shawn Sheridan	Quarter Final Tournament Match	n/a
12	Josh Daniels defeated Striker	Quarter Final Tournament Match	14:25
13	Super Dragon defeated M-Dogg 20	Semi Final Tournament match	11:10
14	B-Boy defeated Josh Daniels	Semi Final Tournament match	11:09
15	Homicide defeated Slyk Wagner Brown (with April Hunter) (c)	Single match for the JCW Heavyweight Championship	13:26
16	Super Dragon defeated B-Boy	Tournament Finals match	23:52

Tournament bracket

Pin-Pinfall; Sub-Submission; CO-Countout; DCO-Double countout; DQ-Disqualification; Ref-Referee's decision

First round
Dave Greco
Damian Adams
M-Dogg 20
Rob Eckos
Super Dragon
Altar Boy Luke
Shawn Sheridan
Sabian
Mike Quackenbush
Jigsaw
B-Boy
Chris Idol
Striker
Dan Barry
Josh Daniels
Tyler Payne

Quarterfinals
Dave Greco
M-Dogg 20
Super Dragon
Shawn Sheridan
Mike Quackenbush
B-Boy
Striker
Josh Daniels

Semi-finals
M-Dogg 20
Super Dragon
B-Boy
Josh Daniels

Final
Super Dragon
B-Boy

=== 2005 ===
The 2005 NWS Jersey J-Cup was a two-block, 16-man tournament held on April 30, 2005, at the Recreation Station Arena in Toms River, New Jersey. The show opened with a tribute to Chris Candido followed by a formal announcement by National Wrestling Superstars, which had recently purchased the rights to the J-Cup, that the tournament would be renamed the Chris Candido Memorial J-Cup Tournament, and the J-Cup itself as the Candido Memorial J-Cup Trophy. It also introduced a new concept in which the opening rounds consisted of Fatal Four Way matches. This reduced the duration of the tournament, eliminating the quarter-finals, while keeping the same number of participants and allowed additional non-tournament matches.

Mike Kruel won the tournament by winning four matches at the event. Over the course of the evening, he defeated Damian Adams, Slayer and Steve Zapf in the opening round, Trent Acid in the semi-finals and Azriael in the final match; Kruel was presented the trophy by Candido's family after the match. In addition to the tournament, there were two championship matches on the undercard; WXW Heavyweight Champion Bison Bravado defended his title against Funky White Boy and AWA Heavyweight Champion Danny Demanto wrestled JD Smooth, both defeating their opponents.

Results

April 30, 2005 in Toms River, New Jersey (Recreation Station Arena)

#	Results	Stipulations	Times
1	Azriael beat Drew Blood, Luis Ortiz and Tommy Force	First Round Tournament match	n/a
2	Deranged defeated Arcadia, Gavin Quest and Neeno Capone	First Round Tournament match	n/a
3	Trent Acid defeated Nick Berk, Devon Moore and Tony Flow	First Round Tournament match	n/a
4	Mike Kruel defeated Damian Adams, Slayer and Steve Zapf	First Round Tournament match	n/a
5	Bison Bravado (c) defeated Funky White Boy	Single match for the WXW Heavyweight Championship	n/a
6	Danny Demanto (c) defeated JD Smooth	Single match for the AWA Heavyweight Championship	n/a
7	Azriael defeated Deranged	Semi Final Tournament match	n/a
8	Mike Kruel defeated Trent Acid	Semi Final Tournament match	n/a
9	Eric Justice and Jim Neidhart beat Hasheem Ali and Simon Diamond	Tag team match	n/a
10	Mike Kruel defeated Azriael	Tournament Finals match	n/a

=== 2006 ===
The 2006 NWS Jersey J-Cup was a two-block, 16-man tournament held on April 29, 2006, at the VFW Hall in Manville, New Jersey. The opening rounds were held as three-man elimination matches.

Grim Reefer won the tournament by winning three matches at the event. Over the course of the evening, he defeated Archadia and Ghanda Rhea Akbar in the opening round, Devon Moore in the semi-finals and Deranged in the final match. In addition to the tournament, a 6-man tag team "grudge" match between Bison Bravado, TNT and Shane Taylor defeated The Famous Clown, Ice Pick Lowinski and Bulldog Collare. Another featured match was WWF Hall of Famer Jimmy “Superfly” Snuka, accompanied by Captain Lou Albano against Johnny Candido, which Snuka won.

Results

April 29, 2006 in Manville, New Jersey (VFW Hall)

#	Results	Stipulations	Times
1	The Grim Reefer defeated Archadia and Ghanda Rhea Akbar	First Round Tournament match	n/a
2	Devon Moore defeated Sabian and Mike Kruel	First Round Tournament match	n/a
3	Deranged defeated Nicky Oceans and Judas Young	First Round Tournament match	n/a
4	Gavin Quest defeated Corvis Fear and Drew Blood (with Ashe-Samuels)	First Round Tournament match	n/a
5	Bison Bravado, TNT and Shane Taylor defeated The Famous Clown, Ice Pick Lowinski and Bulldog Collare	6-man tag team match	n/a
6	Grim Reefer defeated Devon Moore	Semi Final Tournament match	n/a
7	Deranged defeated Gavin Quest	Semi Final Tournament match	n/a
8	Jimmy "Superfly" Snuka (with Captain Lou Albano) defeated Johnny Candido	Singles match	n/a
9	Grim Reefer defeated Deranged	Tournament Finals match	n/a

=== 2007 ===
The 2007 NWS Jersey J-Cup was a two-block, 8-man tournament held on April 21, 2007, at the VFW Hall in Manville, New Jersey. This was the first and only time since 2005 that the tournament was held as a standard single-elimination tournament and with less than 16 participants.

Deranged won the tournament by winning three matches at the event. Over the course of the evening, he defeated Mikey Pacifica in the opening round, Jorge Santi in the semi-finals and NWS Junior Heavyweight Champion Gavin Quest in the final match. In addition to the tournament, two tag team matches were held. The first, an intergender tag team match, matched 2006 NWS King and Queen of the Ring Danny Demanto and Melissa Stripes against 2006 J-Cup winners Grim Reeper and Alexa; the former team was later replaced with Bison Bravado and Amber. The second featured bout was a 6-man tag team match with Greg "The Hammer" Valentine, Salvatore Sincere and NWS Hardcore Champion Johnny Candido wrestling David Sammartino, "Indian Warrior" Draven and Rich "Ice Pick" Lowinski.

Results

April 21, 2007 in Manville, New Jersey (VFW Hall)

#	Results	Stipulations	Times
1	Deranged defeated Mikey Pacifica	First Round Tournament match	n/a
2	Gavin Quest defeated Nicky Oceans	First Round Tournament match	n/a
3	Bison Bravado and Amber versus Danny Demanto and Melissa Stripes	Intergender tag team match	n/a
4	Corvis Fear defeated Rhett Titus	First Round Tournament match	n/a
4	Jorge Santi defeated Minyon	First Round Tournament match	n/a
5	Deranged defeated Jorge Santi	Semi Final Tournament match	n/a
6	Gavin Quest defeated Corvis Fear	Semi Final Tournament match	n/a
7	Greg Valentine, Johnny Candido and Salvatore Sincere versus Wes Draven, Ice Pick and David Sammartino	6-man tag team match	n/a
8	Deranged defeated Gavin Quest	Tournament Finals match	n/a

Tournament bracket

Pin-Pinfall; Sub-Submission; CO-Countout; DCO-Double countout; DQ-Disqualification; Ref-Referee's decision

Quarterfinals
Deranged
Mikey Pacifica
Gavin Quest
Nicky Oceans
Corvis Fear
Rhett Titus
Jorge Santi
Minyon

Semifinals
Deranged
Jorge Santi
Gavin Quest
Corvis Fear

Finals
Deranged
Gavin Quest

=== 2008 ===
The 2008 NWS Jersey J-Cup was a two-block, 16-man tournament held on April 26, 2008, at the VFW Hall in Manville, New Jersey. The opening rounds were held as three-man elimination matches.

Rhett Titus won the tournament by winning three matches at the event. Over the course of the evening, he defeated Mikey Pacifica and Brett Thunder in the opening round, Nicky Oceans in the semi-finals and Drew Blood in the final match. In addition to the tournament, Scotty 2 Hotty wrestled Mike "G.Q." Quest, accompanied by Romeo Roselli, as part of the semi-event.

Results

April 26, 2008 in Manville, New Jersey (VFW Hall)

#	Results	Stipulations	Times
1	Skitzo defeated Ronnie The Red	Singles match	n/a
2	Devon Moore defeated Sabotage and Minyon	First Round Tournament match	n/a
3	Drew Blood defeated Unbreakable Andy and Fantastic Maxx	First Round Tournament match	n/a
4	Mike "Bulldog" Collare defeated Bison Bravado	Singles match	n/a
5	Rhett Titus defeated Mikey Pacifica and Brett Thunder	First Round Tournament match	n/a
4	Nicky Oceans defeated “Firebird” Jorge Santi and Golden Lynx	First Round Tournament match	n/a
5	Drew Blood defeated Devon Moore	Semi Final Tournament match	n/a
6	Rhett Titus defeated Nicky Oceans	Semi Final Tournament match	n/a
7	Nate Mustang defeated J.D. Smoothie	Singles match	n/a
8	Scotty 2 Hotty defeated Mike “G.Q.” Quest (with Romeo Roselli)	Singles match	n/a
9	Rhett Titus defeated Drew Blood	Tournament Finals match	n/a

=== 2009 ===
The 2009 NWS Jersey J-Cup was a two-block, 16-man tournament held on May 16, 2009, at the VFW Hall in Manville, New Jersey. The opening rounds were held as Fatal Four Way matches.

Myke Quest won the tournament by winning four matches at the event. Over the course of the evening, he defeated Arachadia, Corvis Fear and Amasis in the opening round, Nicky Oceans in the semi-finals and Jay Lethal in the final match. In addition to the tournament, former Extreme Championship Wrestling alumni Balls Mahoney and Axl Rotten made a guest appearance to pay tribute to Chris Candido before the show; Mahoney later won a "Big Man Battle Royal" and wrestled Gene Snitsky in a Loser Goes Through a Door match in which the loser would be powerbombed though a door.

Results

May 16, 2009 in Manville, New Jersey (VFW Hall)

#	Results	Stipulations	Times
1	Jay Lethal defeated Mikey Pacifica, J.D. Smoothie and AaronArbo	First Round Tournament match	n/a
2	Nicky Oceans defeated Damian Adams, Joey Janela and Unbreakable Andy	First Round Tournament match	n/a
3	Devon Moore defeated Golden Lynx, Ophidian and Frightmare	First Round Tournament match	n/a
4	Myke Quest defeated Arachadia, Corvis Fear and Amasis	First Round Tournament match	n/a
5	Balls Mahoney won a Big Man Battle Royal	Big Man Battle Royal	n/a
6	Jay Lethal defeated Devon Moore	Semi Final Tournament match	n/a
7	Myke Quest defeated Nicky Oceans	Semi Final Tournament match	n/a
8	Gene Snitsky defeated Balls Mahoney	Loser Goes Through a Door match	n/a
9	Myke Quest defeated Jay Lethal	Tournament Finals match	n/a

=== 2010 ===
The 2010 NWS Jersey J-Cup was a two-block, 16-man tournament held on May 14, 2010, at the Veterans Center in Kenilworth, New Jersey. The opening rounds were held as three-man elimination matches.

R. J. Brewer won the tournament by winning four matches at the event. Over the course of the evening, he defeated Jumping Joey Janela and Nick Talent in the opening round, Joel Maximo in the quarter-finals, Pat Buck in the semi-finals and Nicky Oceans in the final match. In addition to the tournament, Reality Check (Danny Demanto and Kevin Matthews) were declared the co-winners of a "Baker's Dozen Heavyweight Battle Royal". The winner was to receive a match against former World Wrestling Federation superstar Kamala, however, an altercation with special guest referee The Patriot caused to change it to a tag team match.

Results

May 14, 2010 in Kenilworth, New Jersey (Veterans Center)

#	Results	Stipulations	Times
1	R. J. Brewer defeated Jumping Joey Janela and Nick Talent	First Round Tournament match	n/a
2	Pat Buck defeated Alex “Sugarfoot” Payne and “Too Hot” Steve Scott	First Round Tournament match	n/a
3	“The Love Machine” Nicky Oceans defeated Chris D’Andrea and Sabotage	First Round Tournament match	n/a
4	Mike Dennis defeated “Mr. Entertainment” J.D. Smoothie and Devon Moore	First Round Tournament match	n/a
5	Reality Check (Danny Demanto and Kevin Matthews) were declared co-winners of a 13-man battle royal. (Note: The other participants included were: NWS Heavyweight Champion "Corrupted" Corey Havoc, The Masked Assassin, "The Happy Hillbilly" Justin Blackwell, Saddam Insane of the Baghdad Bullies, Mister Nick Gregory, Snake-Eyez, "Cannonball" Jeff Guerrero, Jay Silva, "The Little Gipper" Steve Gipke, Anthony Scorase, and Jack Spade.)	Baker's Dozen Heavyweight Battle Royal; As per the pre-match stipulation, the winner received a match with Kamala. An altercation with special guest referee The Patriot, however, led to a tag team match between Reality Check versus The Patriot and Kamala later that night.	n/a
6	Nicky Oceans defeated Mike Dennis	Semi Final Tournament match	n/a
7	John Walters defeated Pat Buck	Semi Final Tournament match	n/a
8	Kamala and The Patriot defeated Reality Check (Danny Demanto and Kevin Matthews)	Tag Team match	n/a
9	John Walters defeated Nicky Oceans	Tournament Finals match	n/a

=== 2011 ===
The 2011 NWS Jersey J-Cup was a two-block, 12-man tournament held on August 6, 2011, at the New Point Comfort Fire Company Hall in Keansburg, New Jersey. The opening rounds were held as three-man elimination matches.

Nicky Oceans won the tournament by winning three matches at the event. Over the course of the evening, he defeated "Jersey Shore Jock" Mike Dennis and Johnny in the opening round, Chris Steeler in the semi-finals, and Devon Moore in the final match. In addition to the tournament, 2 Rude Dudes (Rampage Rogers and Corey Havoc) were declared the co-winners of a "Baker's Dozen Heavyweight Battle Royal".The winner was to receive a match against former World Wrestling Federation superstar Tommy Dream however, an altercation with special guest referee Johnny Candido (Chris Candido's brother) caused to change it to a tag team match.

Results

August 11, 2011 in Keansburg, New Jersey (New Point Comfort Fire Company Hall)

#	Results	Stipulations	Times	
1	Devon Moore defeated Chris D'Andrea and Nick Talent	First Round Tournament match	n/a	
2	The Jersey Kidd defeated Mike Donovan and Steve Scott	First Round Tournament match	n/a	
3	“The Love Machine" Nicky Oceans defeated Johnny and Mike Dennis	First Round Tournament match	n/a	
4	2 Rude Dudes (Corey Havoc and Rampage Rogers) were declared co-winners of a 13-man battle royal. (Note: The other participants included were: BF Saluka, Bobby Youngblood, Chill Will, Goal-Duh, Johnny Ringo, Michael Reigns, Mr. Nick Gregory, Richard Michaels, Shock, Steve Gipke and Tony Scorace .)	First Round Tournament match	Baker's Dozen Heavyweight Battle Royal; As per the pre-match stipulation, the winner received a match with Tommy Dreamer. An altercation with special guest referee Johnny Candido, however, led to a tag team match between 2 Rude Dudes versus Tommy Dreamer and Johnny Candido later that night.	n/a
5	Devon Moore defeated The Jersey Kidd	Semi Final Tournament match	n/a	
6	Nicky Oceans defeated Chris Steeler	Semi Final Tournament match	n/a	
7	Tommy Dreamer and Johnny Candido defeated 2 Rude Dudes (Corey Havoc and Rampgae Rogers)	Tag Team match	n/a	
8	Nicky Oceans defeated Devon Moore	Tournament Finals match	n/a	

=== 2012 ===
Results

No.	Results	Stipulations
1	Devon Moore defeated B. Fehrm and Nick Napoleon	Chris Candido Memorial J-Cup first round triple threat elimination match
2	Chris Powers defeated JD Smoothie and The Funky White Boy	Chris Candido Memorial J-Cup first round triple threat elimination match
3	Mike Dennis defeated Marcus Streets and Mike Matixx	Chris Candido Memorial J-Cup first round triple threat elimination match
4	Nicky Oceans defeated Eddie Franken and Rikki Roxx	Chris Candido Memorial J-Cup first round triple threat elimination match
5	Rhett Titus defeated Nick Talent and The Jersey Kidd	Chris Candido Memorial J-Cup first round triple threat elimination match
6	Steve Scott defeated Mark Modest and Rob Fury	Chris Candido Memorial J-Cup first round triple threat elimination match
7	Devon Moore defeated Chris Powers	Chris Candido Memorial J-Cup semi-final round match
8	Nicky Oceans defeated Steve Scott	Chris Candido Memorial J-Cup semi-final round match
9	Rhett Titus defeated Mike Dennis	Chris Candido Memorial J-Cup semi-final round match
10	Danny Demanto and Jennifer Cruz defeated Kimberly and Nikki Rich	Tag team match
11	Devon Moore defeated Nicky Oceans and Rhett Titus	Triple threat elimination match in the Chris Candido Memorial J-Cup final

=== 2014 ===
Results

No.	Results	Stipulations	Times
1	Chris Sabin defeated Bandido Jr., Brian Myers and Grim Reefer	Jersey J-Cup first round triple threat elimination match	5:45
2	Joey Janela defeated Jaka, Lance Anoa'i and Steve Scott	Jersey J-Cup first round triple threat elimination match	—
3	Teddy Hart defeated Frightmare, Jigsaw and Shane Strickland	Jersey J-Cup first round triple threat elimination match	—
4	Chris Dickinson defeated Lucky 13, Pinkie Sanchez and Sabu	Jersey J-Cup first round triple threat elimination match	—
5	Joey Janela defeated Shane Strickland	Jersey J-Cup semi-final match	—
6	Chris Dickinson defeated Chris Sabin	Jersey J-Cup semi-final match	—
7	Eric Corvis and Myke Quest defeated Cono and Nate Mustang	Tag team match	—
8	Chris Dickinson defeated Joey Janela	Jersey J-Cup final match	—

=== 2023 ===
Results

Session 1
No.	Results	Stipulations	Times
1	Jordan Oliver defeated Alex Shelley	Jersey J-Cup first round match	17:55
2	Cole Radrick defeated Dante Leon, Dyln McKay, Grim Reefer, Marcus Mathers and Yoya	Six-Way Scramble match in the Jersey J-Cup first round	10:57
3	Blake Christian defeated Alec Price	Jersey J-Cup first round match	13:36
4	Joey Janela defeated Starboy Charlie	Jersey J-Cup first round match	16:34
5	Lio Rush defeated Tony Deppen	Jersey J-Cup first round match	13:25
6	Charles Mason defeated Billie Starkz	Jersey J-Cup first round match	14:19
7	Komander defeated Arez	Jersey J-Cup first round match	12:38
8	Mike Bailey defeated Jonathan Gresham	Jersey J-Cup first round match	20:59

Session 2
No.	Results	Stipulations	Times
1	Mike Bailey defeated Komander	Jersey J-Cup quarter-final match	12:33
2	Jordan Oliver defeated Charles Mason	Jersey J-Cup quarter-final match	14:54
3	Joey Janela defeated Lio Rush	Jersey J-Cup quarter-final match	10:20
4	Blake Christian defeated Cole Radrick	Jersey J-Cup quarter-final match	11:56
5	Jordan Oliver defeated Joey Janela	Jersey J-Cup semi-final match	28:56
6	Mike Bailey defeated Blake Christian	Jersey J-Cup semi-final match	15:30
7	The S.A.T. (Joel Maximo and Jose Maximo) defeated Alec Price and Dante Leon, Brat Pack (Billie Starkz and Starboy Charlie) and Different Youth (Jimmy Lloyd and Marcus Mathers)	Four-way tag team match	9:02
8	Jordan Oliver defeated Mike Bailey	Jersey J-Cup final match for the new JCW World Championship	21:25

Tournament brackets

First Round
Mike Bailey	Pin
Jonathan Gresham	20:59
Arez	12:38
Komander	Pin
Jack Cartwheel Marcus Mathers Yoya Dante Leon Dyln McKay	10:57
Cole Radrick	Pin
Alec Price	13:36
Blake Christian	Pin
Joey Janela	Pin
Starboy Charlie	16:34
Tony Deppen	13:25
Lio Rush	Pin
Charles Mason	Pin
Billie Starkz	14:19
Alex Shelley	17:55
Jordan Oliver	Pin

Quarterfinals
Mike Bailey	Pin
Komander	12:33
Cole Radrick	11:56
Blake Christian	Pin
Joey Janela	Pin
Lio Rush	10:20
Charles Mason	14:54
Jordan Oliver	Pin

Semifinals
Mike Bailey	Pin
Blake Christian	15:30
Joey Janela	28:56
Jordan Oliver	Pin

Final
Mike Bailey	21:25
Jordan Oliver	Pin

=== 2024 ===
Results

Session 1
No.	Results	Stipulations	Times
1	Nick Wayne defeated Marcus Mathers by pinfall	Jersey J-Cup first round match	16:15
2	Matt Makowski defeated Tony Deppen by pinfall	Jersey J-Cup first round match	13:28
3	Masha Slamovich defeated Man Like DeReiss by pinfall	Jersey J-Cup first round match	14:08
4	Joey Janela defeated Kerry Morton by pinfall	Jersey J-Cup first round match	17:17
5	Alec Price defeated Jonathan Gresham by pinfall	Jersey J-Cup first round match	9:40
6	Myron Reed defeated Mr. Danger, Jack Cartwheel, Charles Mason, Cole Radrick and Billie Starkz by pinfall	Six-way scramble match This was a first round match in the Jersey J-Cup.	8:48
7	Violence is Forever (Kevin Ku and Dominic Garrini) (c) defeated Astronauts (Fuminori Abe and Takuya Nomura) by pinfall	Tag team match for the GCW World Tag Team Championship	13:40
8	Jordan Oliver (c) defeated Griffin McCoy by pinfall	Jersey J-Cup first round match for the JCW World Championship	21:00
9	The Great Sasuke defeated Mike Bailey by pinfall	Jersey J-Cup first round match	27:40
(c) / – the champion(s) heading into the match

Session 2
No.	Results	Stipulations	Times
1	Alec Price defeated Joey Janela by pinfall	Jersey J-Cup quarterfinals match	10:22
2	Masha Slamovich defeated Matt Makowski by pinfall	Jersey J-Cup quarterfinals match	10:34
3	Nick Wayne defeated The Great Sasuke by pinfall	Jersey J-Cup quarterfinals match	12:55
4	Jordan Oliver (c) defeated Myron Reed	Jersey J-Cup quarterfinals match for the JCW World Championship	17:22
5	Astronauts (Fuminori Abe and Takuya Nomura) defeated Jonathan Gresham and Mike Bailey by pinfall	Tag team match	18:26
6	Masha Slamovich defeated Alec Price by pinfall	Jersey J-Cup semifinals match	11:55
7	Jordan Oliver (c) defeated Nick Wayne by pinfall	Jersey J-Cup semifinals match for the JCW World Championship	21:05
8	Mr. Danger, Man Like DeReiss, Allie Katch, Cole Radrick and Los Macizos (Ciclope and Miedo Extremo) defeated Charles Mason, Griffin McCoy, Jack Cartwheel, Jimmy Lloyd, Kerry Morton and Tony Deppen (with Parrow) by pinfall	Twelve-person mixed tag team match	16:35
9	Blake Christian (c) defeated Homicide by pinfall	Singles match for the GCW World Championship	13:58
10	Masha Slamovich defeated Jordan Oliver (c) by referee stoppage	Jersey J-Cup finals for the JCW World Championship	18:50
(c) / – the champion(s) heading into the match

Tournament brackets

First Round
Masha Slamovich	Pin
Man Like DeReiss	14:08
Matt Makowski	27:43
Tony Deppen	Pin
Jonathan Gresham	9:40
Alec Price	Pin
Joey Janela	Pin
Kerry Morton	13:36
Nick Wayne	Pin
Marcus Mathers	17:17
The Great Sasuke	Pin
Mike Bailey	27:45
Cole Radrick Jack Cartwheel Mr. Danger Charles Mason Billie Starkz	8:48
Myron Reed	Pin
Griffin McCoy	21:05
Jordan Oliver	Pin

Quarterfinals
Masha Slamovich	Pin
Matt Makowski	10:34
Alec Price	14:18
Joey Janela	Pin
Nick Wayne	Pin
The Great Sasuke	12:58
Myron Reed	14:54
Jordan Oliver	Pin

Semifinals
Masha Slamovich	Pin
Alec Price	11:55
Nick Wayne	21:05
Jordan Oliver	Pin

Final
Masha Slamovich	TKO
Jordan Oliver	18:50

=== 2025 ===
Results

Session 1
No.	Results	Stipulations	Times
1	Marcus Mathers defeated Jackson Drake and Jack Cartwheel by pinfall	Three-way match This was a first round match in the Jersey J-Cup.	13:56
2	Clark Connors defeated Arez by pinfall	Jersey J-Cup first round match	10:16
3	Leon Slater defeated Kevin Knight by pinfall	Jersey J-Cup first round match	12:44
4	Alec Price defeated Cole Radrick by pinfall	Jersey J-Cup first round match	17:11
5	Drew Parker defeated Rich Swann by pinfall	Jersey J-Cup first round match	13:46
6	Atticus Cogar defeated Joey Janela by submission	Jersey J-Cup first round match	17:24
7	Sidney Akeem defeated Fuego Del Sol, Mr. Danger, Charles Mason and Terry Yaki by pinfall	Five-way scramble match This was a first round match in the Jersey J-Cup.	11:29
8	Masha Slamovich (c) defeated Amazing Red by pinfall	Jersey J-Cup first round match for the JCW World Championship	15:25
9	Gabe Kidd (with Clark Connors) defeated Homicide (with Julius Smokes) by pinfall	Singles match	16:33
(c) / – the champion(s) heading into the match

Session 2
No.	Results	Stipulations	Times
1	Alec Price defeated Clark Connors by pinfall	Jersey J-Cup quarterfinals match	10:22
2	Leon Slater defeated Drew Parker by pinfall	Jersey J-Cup quarterfinals match	8:22
3	Sidney Akeem defeated Atticus Cogar by pinfall	Jersey J-Cup quarterfinals match	10:10
4	Masha Slamovich (c) defeated Marcus Mathers	Jersey J-Cup quarterfinals match for the JCW World Championship	12:39
5	Matthew Justice won by pinning Mr. Danger (Note: Order of entrants: Rich Swann, Cole Radrick, Kevin Knight, Fuego Del Sol, Arez, Jackson Drake, Charles Mason, Mr. Danger, Jimmy Lloyd, and Matthew Justice.)	The Jersey Lotto for a future JCW World Championship match	13:54
6	Alec Price defeated Sidney Akeem by pinfall	Jersey J-Cup semifinals match	11:44
7	Masha Slamovich (c) defeated Leon Slater by pinfall	Jersey J-Cup semifinals match for the JCW World Championship	8:11
8	Mance Warner vs. Gabe Kidd ended in a no contest	Hardcore match	16:52
9	Masha Slamovich (c) defeated Alec Price by referee stoppage	Jersey J-Cup finals for the JCW World Championship	18:50
(c) / – the champion(s) heading into the match

Tournament brackets

First Round
Masha Slamovich	Pin
Amazing Red	15:25
Marcus Mathers	Pin
Jackson Drake Jack Cartwheel	13:56
Leon Slater	Pin
Kevin Knight	12:44
Drew Parker	Pin
Rich Swann	13:46
Alec Price	Pin
Cole Radrick	17:11
Clark Connors	Pin
Arez	10:16
Atticus Cogar	Sub
Joey Janela	17:24
Sidney Akeem	Pin
Fuego Del Sol Mr. Danger Charles Mason Terry Yaki	11:29

Quarterfinals
Masha Slamovich	Pin
Marcus Mathers	12:59
Leon Slater	8:22
Drew Parker	Pin
Alec Price	Pin
Clark Connors	14:18
Atticus Cogar	10:10
Sidney Akeem	Pin

Semifinals
Masha Slamovich	Pin
Leon Slater	8:11
Alec Price	Pin
Sidney Akeem	11:44

Final
Masha Slamovich	TKO
Alec Price	18:50

=== 2026 ===
Tournament brackets

First Round
Billie Starkz	Pin
Ryan Clancy	12:33
Oro	11:49
Man Like DeReiss	Pin
KJ Orso	Pin
Terry Yaki	10:27
Vengador	Pin
Griffin McCoy Joe Lando Joey Janela Manny Lo Travis Williams	14:53
Adam Priest	16:03
Jonathan Gresham	Pin
Darian Bengston	Pin
Judas Icarus	8:01
Alec Price	Draw
Jordan Oliver	20:00
Erick Stevens	12:29
Charles Mason	Pin

Quarterfinals
Billie Starkz	Pin
Man Like DeReiss	11:57
KJ Orso	Pin
Vengador	9:02
Jonathan Gresham	Pin
Darian Bengston	15:31
Bye
Charles Mason	N/A

Semifinals
Billie Starkz	Pin
KJ Orso	7:44
Jonathan Gresham	18:52
Charles Mason	Pin

Final
Billie Starkz	5:55
Charles Mason	Pin

== See also ==
- Best of the Super Juniors
