= ROH Top of the Class Trophy Championship =

Professional wrestling championship in Ring of Honor

Details
- Promotion: Ring of Honor (ROH)
- Date established: November 4, 2005
- Date retired: October 25, 2008
Statistics
- First champion(s): Davey Andrews
- Final champion(s): Rhett Titus
- Most reigns: All titleholders (1)
- Longest reign: Shane Hagadorn (315 days)
- Shortest reign: Mitch Franklin (70 days)

The ROH Top of the Class Trophy Championship was a professional wrestling championship intended for young wrestlers that was created and promoted by Ring of Honor (ROH).

== History ==
The ROH Top of the Class Trophy Championship was created in 2005 by Ring of Honor (ROH) and was intended to be held by ROH's rookie competitors and trainees. On November 4, 2005 Davey Andrews became the inaugural champion by defeating Derrick Dempsey and Shane Hagadorn at Showdown in Motown. The championship was deactivated and abandoned in 2008; Rhett Titus was the final holder of the trophy.

== Trophy design ==
Unlike traditional professional wrestling championships, the ROH Top of the Class Trophy Championship was not represented by a belt but by a trophy. The trophy was entirely gold and featured a stand at the bottom of it.

== Reigns ==
Key
No.	Overall reign number
Reign	Reign number for the specific champion
Days	Number of days held
Defenses	Number of successful defenses
<1	Reign lasted less than a day
+	Current reign is changing daily

No.	Champion	Championship change			Reign statistics			Notes	Ref.
No.	Champion	Date	Event	Location	Reign	Days	Defenses	Notes	Ref.
Ring of Honor (ROH) and ROH Wrestling Academy
1	Davey Andrews	November 4, 2005	Showdown in Motown	Detroit, MI	1	71	1	Defeated Derrick Dempsey and Shane Hagadorn to become the inaugural champion.	
—	Vacated	December 17, 2005	—	—	—	—	—	The championship was vacated when Ricky Reyes destroyed the trophy on December 17, 2005.	
2	Derrick Dempsey	January 14, 2006	Hell Freezes Over	Philadelphia, PA	1	140	5	Defeated Bobby Dempsey, Pelle Primeau, and Shane Hagadorn to win the vacant championship.	
3	Shane Hagadorn	June 3, 2006	Destiny	East Windsor, CT	1	315	12		
4	Pelle Primeau	April 14, 2007	Fighting Spirit	Edison, NJ	1	132	1		
5	Mitch Franklin	August 24, 2007	Caged Rage	Hartford, CT	1	70	1		
6	Ernie Osiris	November 2, 2007	Glory by Honor VI: Night One	Philadelphia, PA	1	218	5		
7	Rhett Titus	June 7, 2008	Respect is Earned II	Philadelphia, PA	1	140	1		
—	Deactivated	October 25, 2008	—	—	—	—	—	The title was abandoned on October 25, 2008, making Rhett Titus the final champion.	

== Combined reigns ==
Rank	Wrestler	No. of reigns	Combined defenses	Combined days
1	Shane Hagadorn	1	12	315
2	Ernie Osiris	1	5	218
3	Derrick Dempsey	1	5	140
4	Rhett Titus	1	1	140
5	Pelle Primeau	1	1	132
6	Davey Andrews	1	1	71
7	Mitch Franklin	1	1	70

== See also ==
- ROH Dojo
