= Reckless Youth =

American wrestler (born 1974)

Personal information
- Born: Thomas Carter; September 18, 1974 (age 51) Mount Holly, New Jersey, U.S.

Professional wrestling career
- Ring name(s): Reckless Youth; Silver Wings; Tom Carter
- Billed height: 5 ft 8 in (1.73 m)
- Billed weight: 199 lb (90 kg)
- Trained by: Al Snow; Larry Sharpe; William Regal
- Debut: September 1995
- Retired: 2010

Thomas Carter (born September 18, 1974) is an American retired professional wrestler, better known by his ring name: Reckless Youth. He has competed in numerous North American independent promotions including the East Coast Wrestling Association, Combat Zone Wrestling and Chikara, where he was one of the original founders alongside Mike Quackenbush. In January 1998, Pro Wrestling Illustrated senior editor Bill Apter called Reckless Youth "one of the most recognizable independent stars" in the United States.

== Professional wrestling career ==
=== Early career ===
Carter was part of a small group of "backyard wrestlers", including D'Lo Brown, while growing up in New Jersey. Carter and his friends eventually began renting an actual wrestling ring from Larry Sharpe's Monster Factory. Within a few years, Sharpe eventually offered to book the young men on his shows if they joined his wrestling school and sold tickets for live events. Carter made his pro debut in September 1995. He also trained at Al Snow's Bodyslammers Gym in Lima, Ohio during his rookie year.

=== Great Lakes Wrestling ===
Youth made his debut for Great Lakes Wrestling in a ladder match with Steve Nixon. He later started a stable alongside "Dirty" Don Montoya and Diamond (later Simon Diamond) called East Coast Invasion. Youth went on to win the GLW World title and competed in the final match in GLW defeating "Dirty" Don Montoya in a two out of three falls match on January 17, 1997.

=== Combat Zone Wrestling ===
Youth's first appearance in Combat Zone Wrestling (CZW) was against Justice Pain, at The Staple Gun. He then faced Mike Quackenbush and Ric Blade in a three-way match at Down In Flames on June 19, 1999. Youth would also have a memorable three-way match at Un F'N Believable, against Trent Acid and Blade. He then faced Minoru Fujita at the next three shows, all in a losing effort. His final appearance in CZW was a four-way against Nick Berk, Nick Mondo, and Tony Mamaluke in 2003.

== Personal life ==
Youth married his wife Kathy on November 4, 2000; together they had three children. Youth pursued the career of accounting, a side job he worked while on the independents, and is currently the Director of the Tax Department at Jones Apparel.

== Championships and accomplishments ==
- American Championship Pro Wrestling
  - ACPW Light Heavyweight Championship (1 time)
- Big Time Wrestling
  - BTW Light Heavyweight Championship (1 time)
- East Coast Wrestling Association
  - ECWA Mid-Atlantic Heavyweight Champion (1 time)
  - ECWA Hall of Fame (Class of 2001)
- Global Wrestling Alliance
  - GWA Junior Heavyweight Championship (1 time)
- Great Lakes Wrestling
  - GLW Heavyweight Championship (1 time)
- Hardkore Championship Wrestling
  - HCW Heavyweight Championship (1 time)
  - HCW Incredible 8 winner (2003)
- Independent Wrestling Union
  - IWU Light Heavyweight Championship (1 time)
- International Pro Wrestling
  - IPW Light Heavyweight Championship (1 time)
- IPW Hardcore
  - IPW Jeff Peterson Memorial Cup winner (2003)
- IWA Mid-South
  - IWA Mid-South Light Heavyweight Champion (1 time)
- Jersey All Pro Wrestling
  - JAPW New Jersey State Championship (1 time)
- Jersey Championship Wrestling
  - JCW Championship (1 time)
  - JCW Television Championship (1 time)
  - Jersey J-Cup winner (2002)
- Maryland Championship Wrestling
  - MCW Cruiserweight Champion (1 time)
  - MCW Shane Shamrock Memorial Cup winner (2002)
- Mid Eastern Wrestling Federation
  - MEWF Cruiserweight Championship (1 time)
- National Wrestling Alliance
  - NWA North American Heavyweight Champion (2 times)
- New Jack City Wrestling
  - NJCW Light Heavyweight Championship (1 time)
- Northern States Wrestling Alliance
  - NSWA Light Heavyweight Championship (1 time)
- Pennsylvania Championship Wrestling
  - PCW Americas Championship (1 time)
  - PCW Commonwealth Championship (1 time)
  - PCW Junior Heavyweight Championship (2 times)
  - PCW Tag Team Championship (1 time) – with Lance Diamond
- Pro Wrestling Illustrated
  - PWI ranked him 50 of the top 500 singles wrestlers in the PWI 500 in 1998
- Steel City Wrestling
  - SCW Light Heavyweight Championship (1 time)
