= Revolver Texas Championship =

Professional wrestling championship

- The Revolver Texas Championship belt

Details
- Promotion: The Wrestling Revolver
- Date established: November 19, 2024
- Current champion: KJ Orso
- Date won: September 27, 2025
Statistics
- First champion: Brick Savage
- Longest reign: KJ Orso (341+ days)
- Shortest reign: Brick Savage (34 days)
- Oldest champion: JD Griffey (40–41 years)
- Youngest champion: KJ Orso (29 years, 346 days)
- Heaviest champion: Brick Savage (330 lb (150 kg))
- Lightest champion: KJ Orso (169 lb (77 kg))

The Revolver Texas Championship is a professional wrestling championship created and promoted by The Wrestling Revolver. The title was established on November 19, 2024. The current champion is KJ Orso, who is in his first reign. He won the title by defeating Brick Savage to win the vacant title at Redemption on September 27, 2025, in Bedford, Texas. The title was previously vacant when previous champion JD Griffey suffered an injury that forced Wrestling Revolver to vacate the title.

== History ==
On November 19, 2024, The Wrestling Revolver announced the Revolver Texas Championship, a professional wrestling championship. On May 11, 2025, Revolver announced the "Texas Title Tournament" event in Bedford, Texas, which was slated to feature an eight-person single-elimination tournament held to crown the inaugural champion. The inaugural champion was Brick Savage, who won the title by defeating JD Griffey in the final of the Revolver Texas Title Tournament at Texas Title Tournament on June 28.

=== Inaugural tournament ===
Revolver Texas Title Tournament bracket – Winner: Brick Savage

First round Texas Title Tournament; June 28, 2025
KJ Orso	Win
Vert Vixen
Brick Savage	Win
Exodus Prime
JD Griffey	Win
Stephen Wolf
Damo McCullough
Delynn Cavens	Win

Semifinals; Texas Title Tournament; June 28, 2025
KJ Orso
Brick Savage	Win
JD Griffey	Win
Delynn Cavens

Final; Texas Title Tournament; June 28, 2025
Brick Savage	Win
JD Griffey

== Reigns ==
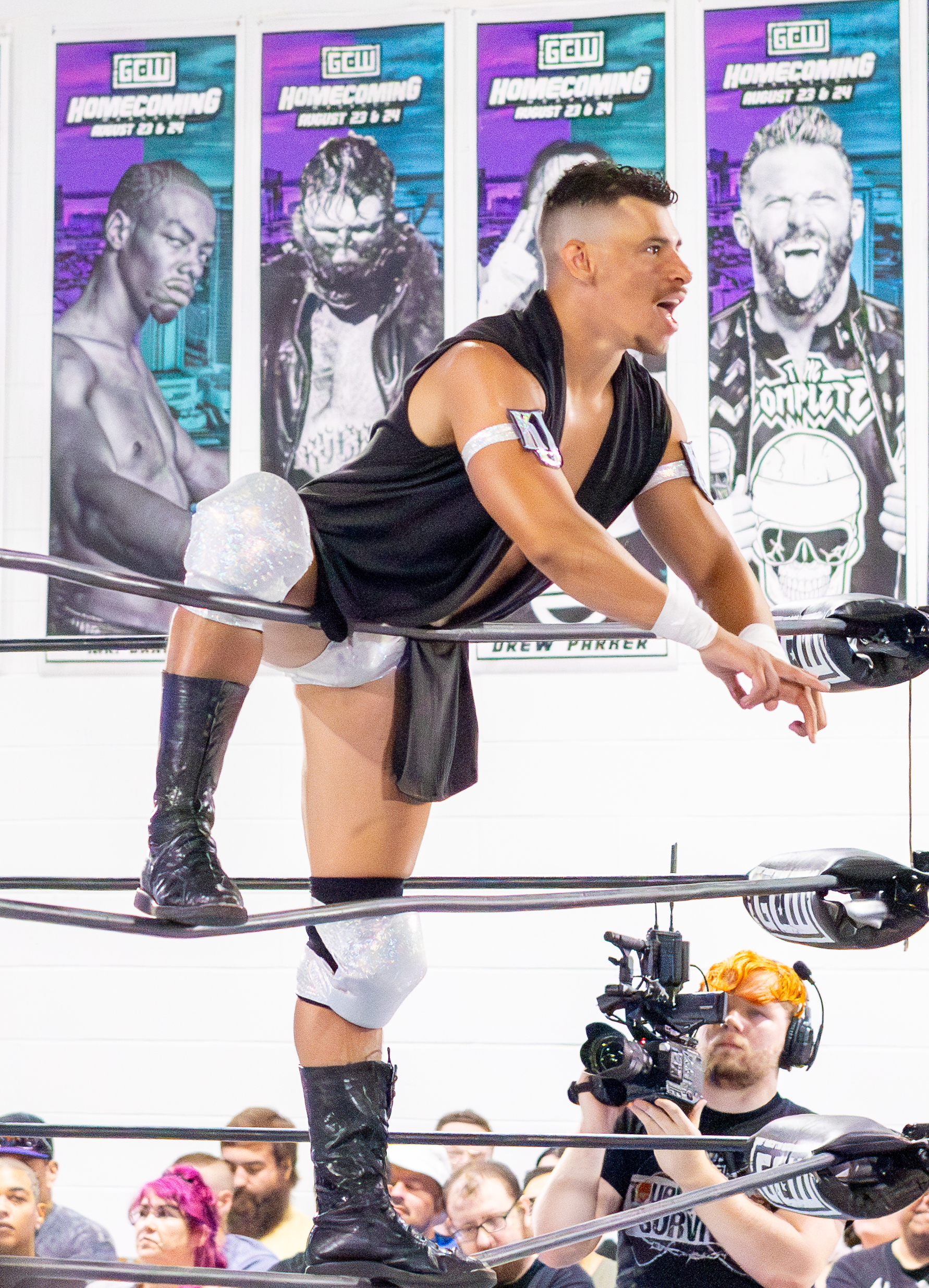
Current champion KJ Orso

As of September 3, 2026, there have been three reigns among three different champions with one vacancy. Brick Savage was the inaugural champion and has the shortest reign at 34 days. KJ Orso has the longest reign at 341+ days. JD Griffey is the oldest champion at 40–41 years old, while Orso is the youngest champion at 29 years and 346 days old.

KJ Orso is the current champion in his first reign. He won the title by defeating Brick Savage to win the vacant title at Redemption on September 27, 2025, in Bedford, Texas. The title was previously vacant when previous champion JD Griffey suffered an injury that forced Wrestling Revolver to vacate the title.

Key
No.	Overall reign number
Reign	Reign number for the specific champion
Days	Number of days held

No.	Champion	Championship change			Reign statistics		Notes	Ref.
No.	Champion	Date	Event	Location	Reign	Days	Notes	Ref.
1	Brick Savage	June 28, 2025	Texas Title Tournament	Bedford, TX	1	34	Defeated JD Griffey in a tournament final to become the inaugural champion.	
2	JD Griffey	August 1, 2025	VIP Killin' Da Business 2	Haltom City, TX	1	48	This was a VIP Wrestling event. This was a Winner Takes All match, where Savage's VIP Heavyweight Championship was also on the line.	
—	Vacated	September 18, 2025	—	—	—	—	Wrestling Revolver vacated the title after previous champion JD Griffey suffered an injury.	
3	KJ Orso	September 27, 2025	Redemption	Bedford, TX	1	341+	Defeated Brick Savage to win the vacant title.	
