= Los Macizos =

Professional wrestling tag team

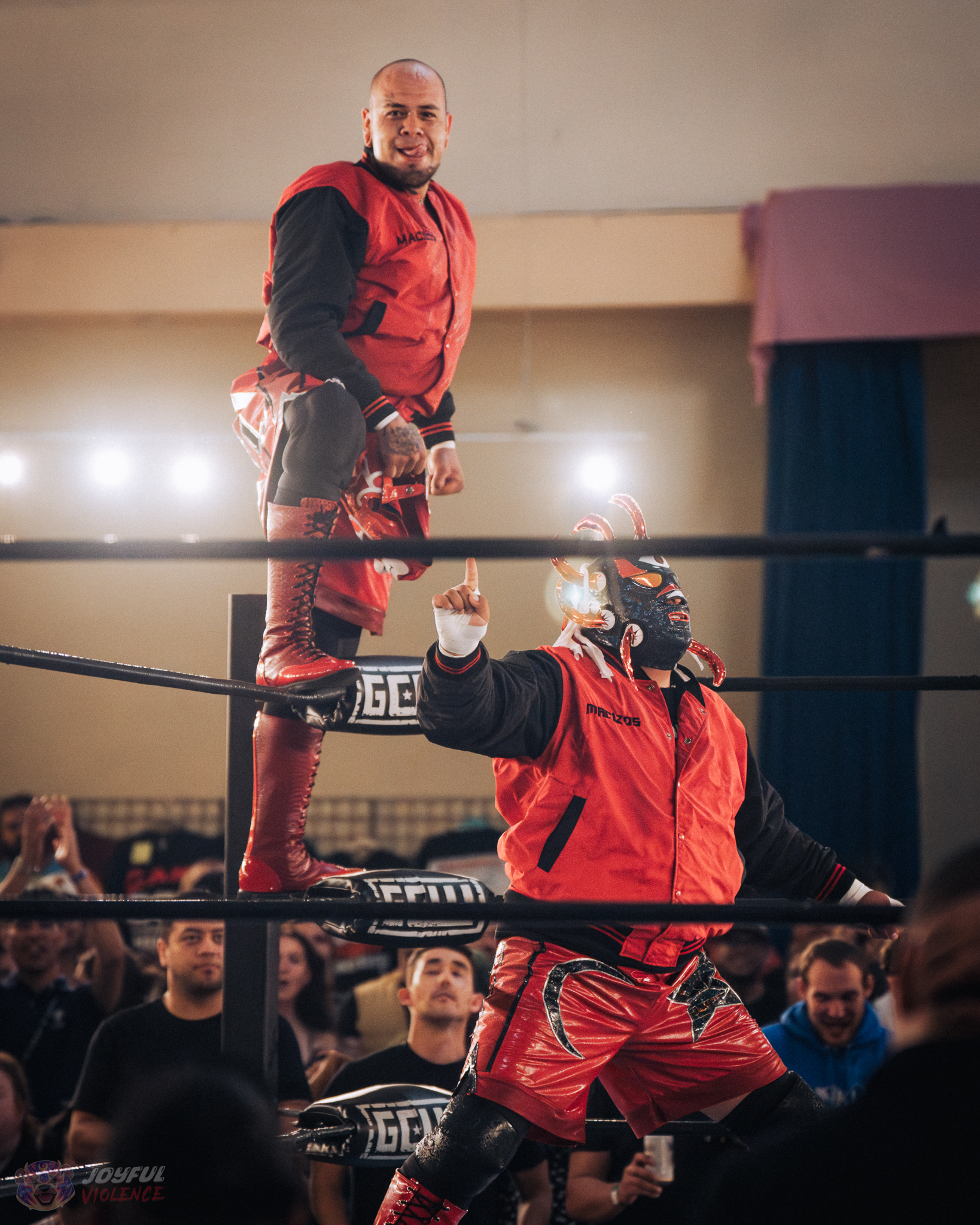
- Ciclope (right) and Miedo Extremo (left) in June 2024

Tag team
- Members: Ciclope; Miedo Extremo
- Name(s): Los Masizos; Los Macizos
- Debut: 2013
- Years active: 2013–2018; 2019–present

Los Macizos (Spanish for "The Massifs") is a Mexican professional wrestling tag team composed of Ciclope (Jhonny Serrano Yedra, born March 11, 1991) and Miedo Extremo (Jonathan Uriel Gijon Perez, born March 31, 1995). They are best known for their work in various promotion of the American and Mexican independent scenes such as Desastre Total Ultraviolento (DTU) and Game Changer Wrestling, mainly in hardcore bouts.

== Professional wrestling career ==
=== Mexican independent circuit (2013–present) ===
==== Desastre Total Ultraviolento (2013–2018) ====
Ciclope and Miedo Extremo made their debut as a tag team at DTU TV - Extremos, a house show promoted by Desastre Total Ultraviolento on November 9, 2013, where they unsuccessfully wrestled Black Fire and Obett, and Los Compadres Extremos (Aeroboy and Violento Jack). During their time in DTU, Ciclope and Extremo have won the DTU Extreme Championship on two occasions each, while Ciclope won the DTU Alto Impacto Championship, the promotion's top title on one occasion.

==== Other promotions ====
At Guerra de Titanes, an event promoted by Lucha Libre AAA World Wide on December 2, 2018, they unsuccessfully challenged reigning champions Los Mercenarios (Rey Escorpión and El Texano Jr.) and Joe Líder and Pagano in a Three-way Extreme Rules tag team match for the AAA World Tag Team Championship.

=== American independent circuit (2017–present) ===
Due to their main freelance work, Ciclope and Miedo Extremo worked for various promotions from the American circuit with which they shared a longer tenure such as Game Changer Wrestling, and briefly working for several others. At MLW Fusion #177, an event promoted by Major League Wrestling on February 10, 2023 (taped August 10), Macizos defeated Lucha Solos (Arkángel Divino and Ultimo Maldito), Anton Carrillo and Extassis, and Fantastik and Rayo Star in a four-way tag team match.

==== Game Changer Wrestling (2017–present) ====
Macizos made their debut in Game Changer Wrestling on the first night of the DTU Epidemia Destructiva Tour 2017 from June 29, 2017, a cross-over event produced by DTU and GCW in which they competed as developmental talent by defeating Jimmy Lloyd and Matt Tremont.

During their time with GCW, they competed in various events promoted by it. On the first night of the GCW Fight Club from October 8, 2022, they defeated Cole Radrick and Joey Janela in tag team competition. One the second night from October 9, Miedo Extremo unsuccessfully challenged Drew Parker for the King of Freedom World Championship. At the 2024 edition of the Jersey J-Cup, Macizos competed outside of the tournament by teaming up with Mr. Danger, Man Like DeReiss, Allie Katch and Cole Radrick to defeat Charles Mason, Griffin McCoy, Jack Cartwheel, Jimmy Lloyd, Kerry Morton and Tony Deppen in a Twelve-person mixed tag team match. In the Joey Janela's Spring Break, Macizos made their first appearance at Joey Janela's Spring Break: Clusterfuck Forever on April 8, 2024, where they unsuccessfully challenge reigning champions Violence is Forever (Dominic Garrini and Kevin Ku) and the teams of The Bollywood Boyz (Gurv Sihra and Harv Sihra), and Juicy Finau and Zilla Fatu in a Punjabi Prison match for the GCW World Tag Team Championship.

Macizos have won the GCW Tag Team Championship a record four times. First on May 13, 2018 at GCW The Untouchables by defeating The Rejects (John Wayne Murdoch and Reed Bentley). They held the titles for a record of 1,162 days which still stands as of today. They won the titles for the second time at The People vs. GCW on July 29, 2022, by defeating Bussy (Allie Katch and Effy) in a three-way match, also involving The Second Gear Crew (Mance Warner and Matthew Justice). On the third occasions, they defeated Mega Bastards (Alex Colon and John Wayne Murdoch) at GCW Drop Dead on October 22, 2022. On the fourth occasion, they defeated Takashi Sasaki and Toru Sugiura at The Wrld on GCW on October 12, 2023.

===== Pro Wrestling Freedoms (2017–2019; 2023) =====
Due to GCW and Freedoms holding business partnerships, Macizos made regular appearances for the Japanese promotion. They debuted at Jun Kasai Produce Nagoya Death Match Carnival 2017 on July 9, where they unsuccessfully challenged Mammoth Sasaki and Toru Sugiura for the King of Freedom World Tag Team Championship. They also defended the GCW Tag Team Championship in Japan multiple times. Their last defence of the titles occurred at FREEDOMS Unchain Night! 2019 on August 11, where they defeated Kenji Fukimoto and Masashi Takeda to retain.

Macizos wrestled at TNT Vs. GCW, a joint show produced by GCW and TNT Extreme Wrestling on September 17, 2023, where they unsuccessfully competed against Lykos Gym (Kid Lykos and Kid Lykos II), Jordan Oliver and Starboy Charlie, and Los Vipers (Arez and Látigo) in a tornado four-way tag team match.

== Championships and accomplishments ==
- Alianza Universal de Lucha Libre
  - AULL Tag Team Championship (1 time, current)
- Azteca Karate Extremo
  - AKE Extremo Championship (1 time) – Ciclope
- Black Mask Lucha Libre
  - BMLL Tag Team Championship (1 time)
- Desastre Total Ultraviolento
  - DTU Alto Impacto Championship (1 time) – Ciclope
  - DTU Extreme Championship (4 times) – Ciclope (2) and Miedo Extremo (2)
  - Maxima Presea Ultraviolenta (2014) – Ciclope
- Game Changer Wrestling
  - GCW Tag Team Championship (4 times)
  - Tournament Of Survival 3 (2018) – Ciclope
  - Nick Gage Invitational 8 (2023) – Miedo Extremo
- Lucha Libre Vanguardia
  - Vanguardia Tag Team Championship (1 time)
- Orden de Lucha Xtrema
  - OLX Hardcore Extreme Championship (1 time) – Ciclope
- Nuevo Generation Xtrema
  - NGX Tag Team Championship (1 time)
- Pro Wrestling Illustrated
  - Ranked No. 62 of the top 100 tag teams in the PWI Tag Team 100 of 2023
- Pro Wrestling Freedoms
  - UWA World Junior Heavyweight Championship (1 time) – Miedo Extremo
- Producciones TC
  - TC Extreme Championship (1 time, inaugural) – Miedo Extremo
- Guanotos Hardcore Crew
  - Hardcore Invitational (2021) – Ciclope
- Zona 23
  - Zona 23 Extremo Championship (2 times) – Ciclope (1) and Miedo Extremo (1)
  - King Of The Deathmatch (2021) – Ciclope
