= Dominic Garrini =

American professional wrestler

- Garrini in April 2025

Personal information
- Born: March 1, 1990 (age 36) North Canton, Ohio, U.S.

Professional wrestling career
- Ring name: Dominic Garrini
- Billed height: 180 cm (5 ft 11 in)
- Billed weight: 94 kg (207 lb)
- Trained by: AIW Academy (Candice LeRae & Johnny Gargano); Arthur McArthur; Sidney von Engeland
- Debut: 2016

Dominic Garrini is an American professional wrestler currently wrestling on the independent circuit as one-half of Violence is Forever, with Kevin Ku.

== Professional wrestling career ==
=== American independent circuit (2016–present) ===
Garrini made his professional wrestling debut in AIW Academy, the developmental branch of Absolute Intense Wrestling (AIW), being trained by Candice LeRae and Johnny Gargano. He wrestled his first match at AIW Fullest House, a house show promoted on March 5, 2016, where he competed in a six-way scramble won by Alex Daniels which also involved Britt Baker, Dr. Daniel C. Rockingham, Garrison King and Joshua Singh.

He is known for his tenures with various promotions from the American independent scene with which he has shared brief or longer stints such as Black Label Pro, Deadlock Pro-Wrestling, Platinum Championship Wrestling, Warrior Wrestling and many others. At National Wrestling Alliance's 2022 Crockett Cup, Ku teamed up with Dominic Garrini to unsuccessfully challenge The Bad News Boyz (Brandon Tate and Brent Tate), The Heatseekers (Elliott Russell and Matt Sigmon) and The Rip City Shooters (Joshua Bishop and Wes Barkley) in a Four-way tag team match to determine the 16 seed in the Crockett Cup tournament.

=== European independent circuit (2019–2025) ===
==== Westside Xtreme Wrestling (2019, 2022, 2025) ====
Garrini competed in Westside Xtreme Wrestling's WXw World Tag Team Festival, making his debut at the 2019 edition by teaming up with Kevin Ku in a losing effort against Arrows Of Hungary (Dover and Icarus). He returned to the competition at the 2022 edition where he teamed up with Ku again, this time placing themselves in the B block of the tournament where they scored a total of three points against the teams of Amboss (Icarus and Robert Dreissker), Fuminori Abe and Shigehiro Irie and Rott Und Flott (Michael Schenkenberg and Nikita Charisma), failing to qualify for the finals.

==== Progress Wrestling (2022) ====
Garrini briefly competed in Progress Wrestling. He made his debut at PROGRESS Chapter 142 on September 25, 2022, where he and Kevin Ku unsuccessfully challenged Sunshine Machine (Chuck Mambo and TK Cooper) for the PROGRESS Tag Team Championship. Two nights later at PROGRESS Return Of The Fly on September 27, 2022, Garrini and Ku fell short to Aussie Open (Mark Davis and Kyle Fletcher) in tag team competition.

=== Game Changer Wrestling (2019–present) ===
Garrini made his debut in Game Changer Wrestling at GCW Lights Out on July 21, 2019, where he teamed up with Kevin Ku in a losing effort against The Rejects (John Wayne Murdoch and Reed Bentley) and The Carnies (Kerry Awful and Nick Iggy) as a result of a three-way tag team match. At GCW Si Or No? on November 4, 2023, Garrini teamed up with Ku to defeat Los Macizos (Ciclope and Miedo Extremo) for the GCW Tag Team Championship.

During his time in the company, he competed in various signature events promoted by it. One of them is the Jersey J-Cup where he made his debut at the 2024 edition, not as a contestant of the tournament but by teaming up with Kevin Ku and successfully defending the GCW Tag Team Championship against Astronauts (Fuminori Abe and Takuya Nomura). As for the Joey Janela's Spring Break series, he made his debut at the fourth event from 2020 where he competed in the traditional Clusterfuck Battle Royal won by Nate Webb and also involving various notable opponents, both male and female such as Flash Flanagan, JTG, Kerry Morton, Cassandro El Exotico, Jody Threat, Elayna Black and many others. At Joey Janela's Spring Break: Clusterfuck Forever from April 6, 2024, Garrini and Ku successfully defended GCW Tag Team Championship against Jacob Fatu and Zilla Fatu, Los Macizos (Ciclope and Miedo Extremo) and The Bollywood Boyz (Gurv Sihra and Harv Sihra) in a Punjabi Prison match.

At Josh Barnett's Bloodsport XIV on August 2, 2025, Garrini fell short to Charlie Dempsey.

=== Major League Wrestling (2019; 2020–2021) ===
Garrini shared a short stint with Major League Wrestling (MLW). He made his debut at the 2019 Blood and Thunder event where he teamed up with Douglas James and defeated The Dynasty (Alexander Hammerstone and Richard Holliday).

He made his debut as a tag team division member at MLW Fusion #113 on December 9, 2020, where he teamed up with Kevin Ku to defeat Jason Dugan and Robert Martyr. He continued making sporadic appearances in the Fusion program, eventually moving up for the title scenes as he and Ku fell short to TJP and Bu Ku Dao in a number one contendership match for the MLW World Tag Team Championship at MLW Fusion #119 on January 27, 2021.

=== All Elite Wrestling (2022, 2023) ===
Garrini made a couple of appearances in All Elite Wrestling. First of them occurred at AEW Dark: Elevation #51 on February 21, 2022, where he teamed up with Kevin Ku, Ariel Levy, Chico Adams and Dean Alexander in a losing effort against 2point0 (Jeff Parker and Matt Lee), Daniel Garcia and The Gunn Club (Austin Gunn and Colten Gunn).

== Championships and accomplishments ==
- Action Wrestling
  - Action Tag Team Championship (1 time) – with Kevin Ku
- Black Label Pro
  - BLP Tag Team Championship (1 time) – with Kevin Ku
- Capital City Championship Combat
  - C4 Tag Team Championship (2 times) – with Kevin Ku
  - TAG Memorial Tournament (2023) – with Kevin Ku
- Deadlock Pro-Wrestling
  - DPW Worlds Tag Team Championship (2 times) – with Kevin Ku
  - Tag Festival Tournament (2024) – with Kevin Ku

- DPW Awards (1 time)
  - Match of the Year (2024) - with Kevin Ku vs. Mike Bailey and Jake Something at 3rd Anniversary

- Game Changer Wrestling
  - GCW Tag Team Championship (2 times) – with Kevin Ku
- Independent Wrestling TV
  - IWTV Independent Wrestling Tag Team Championship (1 time) – with Kevin Ku
- Paradigm Pro Wrestling
  - PPW Heavy Hitters Championship (1 time)
  - Fighting Spirit Heavyweight Grand Prix (2019)
- Pro Wrestling Illustrated
  - Ranked No. 233 of the top 500 singles wrestlers in the PWI 500 in 2023
  - Ranked No. 10 of the top 100 tag teams in the PWI Tag Team 100 of 2022 – with Kevin Ku
- Southern Underground Pro
  - SUP Bonestorm Championship (1 time)
  - SUP Tag Team Championship (1 time, inaugural) – with Kevin Ku
  - SUP Tag Team Title Tournament (2018) – with Kevin Ku
- Timebomb Pro Wrestling
  - Timebomb Championship (1 time)
- Ultimate Xtreme Wrestling Alliance
  - UXWA Heavyweight Championship (1 time)
