= Kevin Ku =

American professional wrestler

- Ku in February 2024

Personal information
- Born: August 29, 1988 (age 38) Birmingham, Alabama, U.S.

Professional wrestling career
- Ring name(s): Kevin Ku; Kevin Park
- Billed height: 180 cm (5 ft 11 in)
- Billed weight: 91 kg (201 lb)
- Trained by: Brian Fury
- Debut: 2014

Kevin Ku is an American professional wrestler currently wrestling on the independent circuit as one-half of Violence is Forever, with Dominic Garrini.

== Professional wrestling career ==
=== American independent circuit (2014–present) ===
Ku made his professional wrestling debut at IWE Scars & Stripes, a house show promoted by Independent Wrestling Entertainment on July 12, 2014, where he fell short to Ace Romero. He is known for his tenures with various promotions from the American independent scene with which he has shared brief or longer stints such as Black Label Pro, Deadlock Pro-Wrestling, Platinum Championship Wrestling, Warrior Wrestling and many others. At National Wrestling Alliance's 2022 Crockett Cup, Ku teamed up with Dominic Garrini to unsuccessfully challenge The Bad News Boyz (Brandon Tate and Brent Tate), The Heatseekers (Elliott Russell and Matt Sigmon) and The Rip City Shooters (Joshua Bishop and Wes Barkley) in a Four-way tag team match to determine the 16 seed in the Crockett Cup tournament.

=== European independent circuit (2019–2022) ===
==== Westside Xtreme Wrestling (2019, 2022) ====
Ku competed in Westside Xtreme Wrestling's World Tag Team Festival, making his debut at the 2019 edition by teaming up with Dominic Garrini in a losing effort against Arrows Of Hungary (Dover and Icarus). He returned to the competition at the 2022 edition where he teamed up with Garrini again, this time placing themselves in the B block of the tournament where they scored a total of three points against the teams of Amboss (Icarus and Robert Dreissker), Fuminori Abe and Shigehiro Irie and Rott Und Flott (Michael Schenkenberg and Nikita Charisma), failing to qualify for the finals.

==== Progress Wrestling (2022) ====
Ku briefly competed in Progress Wrestling. He made his debut at PROGRESS Chapter 142 on September 25, 2022, where he and Dominic Garrini unsuccessfully challenged Sunshine Machine (Chuck Mambo and TK Cooper) for the PROGRESS Tag Team Championship. Two nights later at PROGRESS Return Of The Fly on September 27, 2022, Ku and Garrini fell short to Aussie Open (Mark Davis and Kyle Fletcher). At BLP Total Eclipse Of The Hart, an event promoted by Black Label Pro on August 27, 2022, Ku unsuccessfully challenged Big Damo for the PROGRESS World Championship.

=== Game Changer Wrestling (2019–present) ===
Ku made his debut in Game Changer Wrestling at GCW Lights Out on July 21, 2019, where he teamed up with Dominic Garrini in a losing effort against The Rejects (John Wayne Murdoch and Reed Bentley) and The Carnies (Kerry Awful and Nick Iggy) as a result of a three-way tag team match. At GCW Si Or No? on November 4, 2023, Ku teamed up with Dominic Garrini to defeat Los Macizos (Ciclope and Miedo Extremo) for the GCW Tag Team Championship.

During his time in the company, he competed in various signature events promoted by it. One of them is the Jersey J-Cup where he made his debut at the 2024 edition, not as a contestant of the tournament but by teaming up with Dominic Garrini and successfully defending the GCW Tag Team Championship against Astronauts (Fuminori Abe and Takuya Nomura). As for the Joey Janela's Spring Break series, he made his debut at the fourth event from 2020 where he competed in the traditional Clusterfuck Battle Royal won by Nate Webb and also involving various notable opponents, both male and female such as Flash Flanagan, JTG, Kerry Morton, Cassandro El Exotico, Jody Threat, Elayna Black and many others. At Joey Janela's Spring Break: Clusterfuck Forever from April 6, 2024, Ku and Dominic Garrini successfully defended the GCW Tag Team Championship against Jacob Fatu and Zilla Fatu, Los Macizos (Ciclope and Miedo Extremo) and The Bollywood Boyz (Gurv Sihra and Harv Sihra) in a Punjabi Prison match.

=== Major League Wrestling (2020–2021) ===
Ku shared a short stint with Major League Wrestling (MLW). He made his debut at MLW Fusion #113 on December 9, 2020, where he teamed up with Dominic Garrini to defeat Jason Dugan and Robert Martyr. He continued making sporadic appearances in the Fusion program, eventually moving up for the title scenes as he and Garrini fell short to TJP and Bu Ku Dao in a number one contendership match for the MLW World Tag Team Championship at MLW Fusion #119 on January 27, 2021. Ku made his pay-per-view debut at Battle Riot III on July 10, 2021, where he competed in a 41-man Battle Riot match for a future MLW World Heavyweight Championship opportunity won by Alexander Hammerstone and also involving various other notable opponents such as Mads Krügger, Davey Richards, Tom Lawlor, King Mo, Alex Kane, Savio Vega, Myron Reed and many others.

=== All Elite Wrestling (2022, 2023) ===
Ku made a couple of appearances in All Elite Wrestling. First of them occurred at AEW Dark: Elevation #51 on February 21, 2022, where he teamed up with Dominic Garrini, Ariel Levy, Chico Adams and Dean Alexander in a losing effort against 2point0 (Jeff Parker and Matt Lee), Daniel Garcia and The Gunn Club (Austin Gunn and Colten Gunn). His second appearance took place on the third night of Fight for the Fallen 2023 where he fell short to Powerhouse Hobbs in singles competition.

== Championships and accomplishments ==
- Action Wrestling
  - Action Championship (1 time)
  - Action Tag Team Championship (1 time) – with Dominic Garrini
- Black Label Pro
  - BLP Heavyweight Championship (2 time, current)
  - BLP Tag Team Championship (1 time) – with Dominic Garrini
  - Turbo Graps 24 (2023)
- Capital City Championship Combat
  - C4 Tag Team Championship (2 times) – with Dominic Garrini
  - TAG Memorial Tournament (2023) – with Dominic Garrini
- Dojo Pro Wrestling
  - Dojo Pro White Belt Championship (1 time)
- Deadlock Pro-Wrestling
  - DPW Worlds Tag Team Championship (2 times) – with Dominic Garrini
  - Tag Festival Tournament (2024) – with Dominic Garrini

- DPW Awards (1 time)
  - Match of the Year (2024) - with Dominic Garrini vs. Mike Bailey and Jake Something at 3rd Anniversary

- Game Changer Wrestling
  - GCW Tag Team Championship (2 times) – with Dominic Garrini
- Independent Wrestling TV
  - IWTV Independent Wrestling Tag Team Championship (1 time) – with Dominic Garrini
- Pro Wrestling Freedom
  - PWF Heavyweight Championship (1 time)
  - PWF Tag Team Championship (1 time) – with Dominic Garrini
- Pro Wrestling Illustrated
  - Ranked No. 192 of the top 500 singles wrestlers in the PWI 500 in 2024
  - Ranked No. 63 of the top 100 tag teams in the PWI Tag Team 100 of 2023 – with Dominic Garrini
- Southern Underground Pro
  - SUP Tag Team Championship (1 time, inaugural) – with Dominic Garrini
  - SUP Tag Team Title Tournament (2018) – with Dominic Garrini
