= Deadlock Pro-Wrestling =

American independent professional wrestling promotion

- Trade name: Deadlock Pro-Wrestling
- Type: Private
- Industry: Professional wrestling
- Founded: November 1, 2021; 4 years ago
- Founders: Anthony Douglas; James Darnell; John Blud
- Headquarters: North Carolina, U.S.
- Owners: Anthony Douglas; James Darnell; John Blud
- Website: deadlockpro.com

Deadlock Pro-Wrestling (stylized as DEADLOCK Pro Wrestling), often referred to simply as DPW, was an American independent professional wrestling promotion, founded on November 1, 2021, by Anthony Douglas, James Darnell, and John Blud. On December 11, DPW taped the first episode of their broadcast show, Fire, which aired five days later on YouTube. Since then, new episodes of DPW's Fire and Spark programs have aired on YouTube and the promotion's streaming platform, DPW On Demand. The name of the promotion is derived from the Deadlock Podcast, which is hosted by the promotion's founders.

== History ==
On November 1, 2021, the formation of Deadlock Pro-Wrestling (DPW) was announced by Anthony Douglas (TonyPizzaGuy), James Darnell (Pulse), and John Blud (Jawnny from NewLegacyInc), the hosts of the Deadlock Podcast. On December 11, DPW taped their first show, Fire, which aired on YouTube on December 16. The first episode of Fire introduced a tournament to crown the first DPW Worlds Champion. Fire would conclude on June 3, 2022, due to the series not being considered financially successful enough to continue. Thus, the company would stick to its monthly event format.

On January 8, 2022, DPW taped their first internet pay-per-view (PPV) event named You Already Know, which aired on January 15. At the event, Bojack defeated Andrew Everett in the DPW Worlds Championship tournament finals to become the inaugural champion. On April 16, at Forever, The Reality (Chance Rizer and Patrick Scott) defeated The Workhorsemen (Anthony Henry and JD Drake) to became the first Worlds Tag Team Champions. On June 10, at Showdown In The Carolinas, Calvin Tankman defeated Kevin Ku in a tournament final to became the inaugural National Champion, and on August 6, at Believe The Hype, Raychell Rose defeated Rosemary in a tournament final to became the inaugural Women's Worlds Champion.

On January 14, 2023, DPW held their first live PPV event named Live 1: Ali vs KENTo. On April 16, 2023, the promotion held Live 2 in New Jersey; this marked their first event outside of North Carolina. On April 25 and 27, 2023, DPW held a two-night collaboration event with Gatoh Move Pro Wrestling in Japan, which marked their first event outside of the United States. On December 2, 2023, DPW announced it would be touring outside of North Carolina for the year of 2024. Such locations included Texas and Illinois.

On March 29, 2024, DPW announced that they had entered into a strategic partnership with fellow independent wrestling promotions West Coast Pro Wrestling and Prestige Wrestling. It was announced on June 7, 2024 that all future DPW events, starting from Limit Break, would be made available on Wrestle Universe.

On November 8, 2025, DPW announced the company would be going on an indefinite hiatus in 2026; 4th Anniversary will be its last ever show in the US. Despite the company's hiatus, Mei Suruga would continue to defend the Women's Worlds Championship in ChocoPro.

== Programming and events ==
=== Former ===
==== DPW Fire ====
Fire was the flagship program of DPW that aired DPW's YouTube channel and DPW On Demand. The series debuted on December 16, 2021, originally airing on the DPW's YouTube channel; it concluded on June 3, 2022.

==== DPW Spark ====
Spark is a web television program that airs on DPW's YouTube and the company's streaming service DPW On Demand. The series debuted on December 30, 2021 and concluded on August 19, 2023. The series acts as a pre-show to major events.

=== Major events ===
Deadlock Pro-Wrestling has produced 47 chronological events. The first event took place on January 8, 2022, in Raleigh, North Carolina, at the Raleigh Convention Center. The Durham Armory in Durham, North Carolina, has held the most events with nine.

== Championships and accomplishments ==
| Championship | Current champion(s) | Reign | Date won | Days held | Successful defenses | Location | Notes | Ref. |
|---|---|---|---|---|---|---|---|---|
| DPW Worlds Championship | LaBron Kozone | 1 | December 12, 2025 | 296+ | 0 | Cary, NC | Defeated Jake Something at 4th Anniversary in a Winner Takes All match, in which Kozone's DPW National Championship was also on the line. Aired on tape delay on December 21, 2025. | |
| DPW National Championship | LaBron Kozone | 1 | December 8, 2024 | 665+ | 9 | Durham, NC | Defeated Adam Priest at 3rd Anniversary. | |
| DPW Worlds Tag Team Championship | Miracle Generation (Dustin Waller and Kylon King) | 2 | December 12, 2025 | 296+ | 0 | Cary, NC | Defeated Bo-Dash (Bojack and Morgan Dash) at 4th Anniversary. Aired on tape delay on December 21, 2025. | |
| DPW Women's Worlds Championship | Mei Suruga | 1 | December 12, 2025 | 296+ | 3 | Cary, NC | Defeated Lena Kross at 4th Anniversary. Aired on tape delay on December 21, 2025. Previous champion Queen Aminata vacated the title due to a neck injury. | |

=== Tournaments ===
– Championship victory
– Championship match loss

| Accomplishment | Winner(s) | Date won | Note |
|---|---|---|---|
| Carolina Classic 2022 | Lucky Ali | October 15, 2022 | Defeat defending champion Bojack and Kidd Bandit to win the DPW Worlds Championship at World's Strongest 2022. |
| Tag Festival 2023 | The Workhorsemen (Anthony Henry and JD Drake) | June 18, 2023 | Won the DPW Worlds Tag Team Championship in the finals. |
| Carolina Classic 2023 | Jay Malachi | September 17, 2023 | Defeat Lucky Ali to win the DPW Worlds Championship the same night. |
| Tag Festival 2024 | Violence Is Forever (Kevin Ku and Dominic Garrini) | July 7, 2024 | Defeated Speedball x Something (Mike Bailey and Jake Something) to win the DPW Worlds Tag Team Championship at 3rd Anniversary. |
| Carolina Classic 2024 | Jake Something | September 15, 2024 | Defeated Calvin Tankman to win the DPW Worlds Championship at Super Battle 2024. |
| Battle of the Best 2024 | Dani Luna | October 19, 2024 | Defeated Miyuki Takase to win the DPW Women's Worlds Championship at Title Fight in Texas. |
| Tag Festival 2025 | Miracle Generation (Dustin Waller and Kylon King) | July 13, 2025 | Won the DPW Worlds Tag Team Championship in the finals. |
| Carolina Classic 2025 | Jake Something (2) | September 21, 2025 | Defeated Adam Priest to win the DPW Worlds Championship at Super Battle 2025. |
| Battle of the Best 2025 | Queen Aminata | September 21, 2025 | Defeated Nicole Matthews to win the DPW Women's Worlds Championship at Super Battle 2025. |

=== DPW Awards ===
==== Wrestler of the Year ====
| Year | Wrestler |
|---|---|
| 2022 | Bojack |
| 2023 | Jay Malachi |
| 2024 | Jake Something |

==== Breakout Star of the Year ====
| Year | Wrestler |
|---|---|
| 2022 | Jay Malachi |
| 2023 | Bryan Keith |
| 2024 | LaBron Kozone |

==== Match of the Year ====
| Year | Match |
|---|---|
| 2022 | Andrew Everett vs. Konosuke Takeshita at Believe The Hype |
| 2023 | Chris Danger vs. Shawn Spears at World's Strongest |
| 2024 | Speedball x Something (Mike Bailey and Jake Something) vs. Violence Is Forever (Dominic Garrini and Kevin Ku) at 3rd Anniversary |

==== Tag Team of the Year ====
| Year | Tag Team |
|---|---|
| 2022 | The Workhorsemen (Anthony Henry and JD Drake) |
| 2023 | The Workhorsemen (Anthony Henry and JD Drake) |
| 2024 | Speedball x Something (Mike Bailey and Jake Something) |

==== Event of the Year ====
| Year | Event |
|---|---|
| 2022 | Believe The Hype |
| 2023 | Carolina Classic |
| 2024 | Super Battle |

==== Moment of the Year ====
| Year | Moment |
|---|---|
| 2022 | Konosuke Takeshita yelling "Let's fucking go" at Fire |
| 2023 | Chris Danger challenges Adam Cole at Spark |
| 2024 | Jake Something wins the DPW Worlds Championship at Super Battle |
