= ROH Dojo =

Professional wrestling school

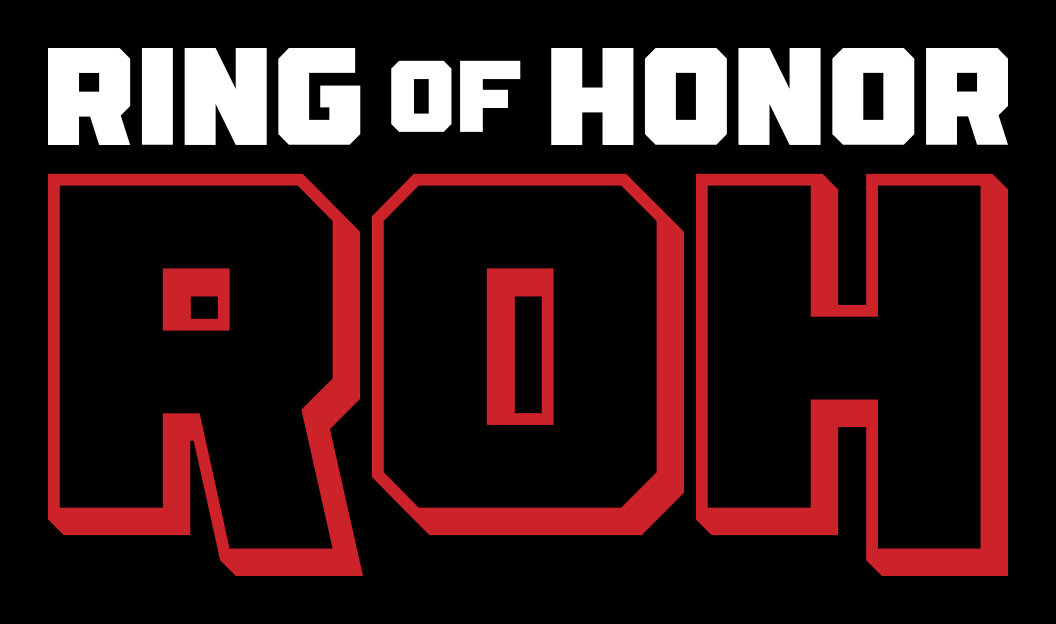
- Founded: 2002; 2012; 2016
- Style: Rookie Training for Professional wrestling
- Headquarters: Baltimore, Maryland
- Founder: Rob Feinstein
- Owner: Tony Khan
- Parent: Ring of Honor (ROH)
- Formerly: ROH Wrestling Academy (2002–2016)
- Website: www.rohwrestling.com

The ROH Baltimore Dojo, formerly known as the ROH Wrestling Academy and commonly known simply as the ROH Dojo, was a professional wrestling school operated by the American professional wrestling promotion Ring of Honor (ROH) in Baltimore, Maryland.

Trainees from the school are referred to as the Future of Honor.

== History ==
Originally named the ROH Wrestling Academy, the ROH Dojo was the official professional wrestling school system of Ring of Honor (ROH) that first opened in 2002. Its later name was adopted in August 2016, when the school reopened after a hiatus. Delirious served as the head trainer of the school with Cheeseburger and Will Ferrara as his assistants. Previous head trainers of the school include former ROH World Champions CM Punk, Austin Aries, and Bryan Danielson. From 2005 to 2008, ROH promoted the Top of the Class Trophy, which was held exclusively by the students of the ROH Wrestling Academy. The holders of the trophy were selected by the school's head trainer.

In 2014, Future of Honor was launched as a way to highlight trainees from the ROH Dojo system. On April 18, ROH held their first Future of Honor event in Newville, Pennsylvania. In addition to promoting Future of Honor exclusive events, ROH also began holding matches featuring dojo trainees and other young wrestlers on their main shows, referring to these matches as "Future of Honor matches".

In 2019, Maryland based independent promotion MCW Pro Wrestling (MCW) became the official developmental territory of ROH, with the ROH Dojo remaining the promotion's wrestling school. After this, MCW and Future of Honor began co-promoting events.

The Dojo closed following Tony Khan's purchase of ROH.

== ROH Top of the Class Trophy Championship ==
The ROH Top of the Class Trophy Championship was a championship that was competed for and won by ROH Dojo trainees.

== See also ==
- NJPW Dojo
