= Fuego Del Sol =

American professional wrestler

Fuego del Sol
- Orso as one half of the GCW Tag Team Champions in August 2026

Personal information
- Born: KJ Orso; October 16, 1995 (age 31) Mobile, Alabama

Professional wrestling career
- Ring name(s): El Fuego; El Fuego Del Sol; Fuego Del Sol; Fuego I KAGE; KJ Orso
- Billed height: 5 ft 10 in (1.78 m)
- Billed weight: 170 lb (77 kg)
- Billed from: Mobile, Alabama
- Debut: May 24, 2014

KJ Orso (born October 16, 1995), better known by the ring name Fuego Del Sol ("Fire of the Sun"), is an American professional wrestler. He performs on the independent circuit under his real name – predominantly for Game Changer Wrestling (GCW), where he is one-half of the GCW World Tag Team Champions with Sam Stackhouse in their first reign as a team and individually. Formerly a masked wrestler until 2025, he is best known for his work in All Elite Wrestling (AEW) from 2020 to 2023.

He is also known as a founding member of the trampoline backyard wrestling project Kids Backyard Wrestling (KBW), where he worked as KAGE (stylized in all caps).

== Professional wrestling career ==
=== Independent circuit (2014–present) ===
Orso debuted in May 2014, largely competing on the independent circuit in Oklahoma and Texas.

=== Impact Wrestling (2017, 2019) ===
He participated in Impact Wrestling's Collision in Oklahoma on October 14, 2017, in a four-way match against Trevor Lee, DJZ and Malico. At Victory Road on September 14, 2019, Del Sol and Retro Randy were defeated by The North (Ethan Page and Josh Alexander).

=== WWE (2020) ===
He also wrestled for WWE on the January 6, 2020 episode of Raw, losing to Erick Rowan.

=== All Elite Wrestling (2020–2023) ===
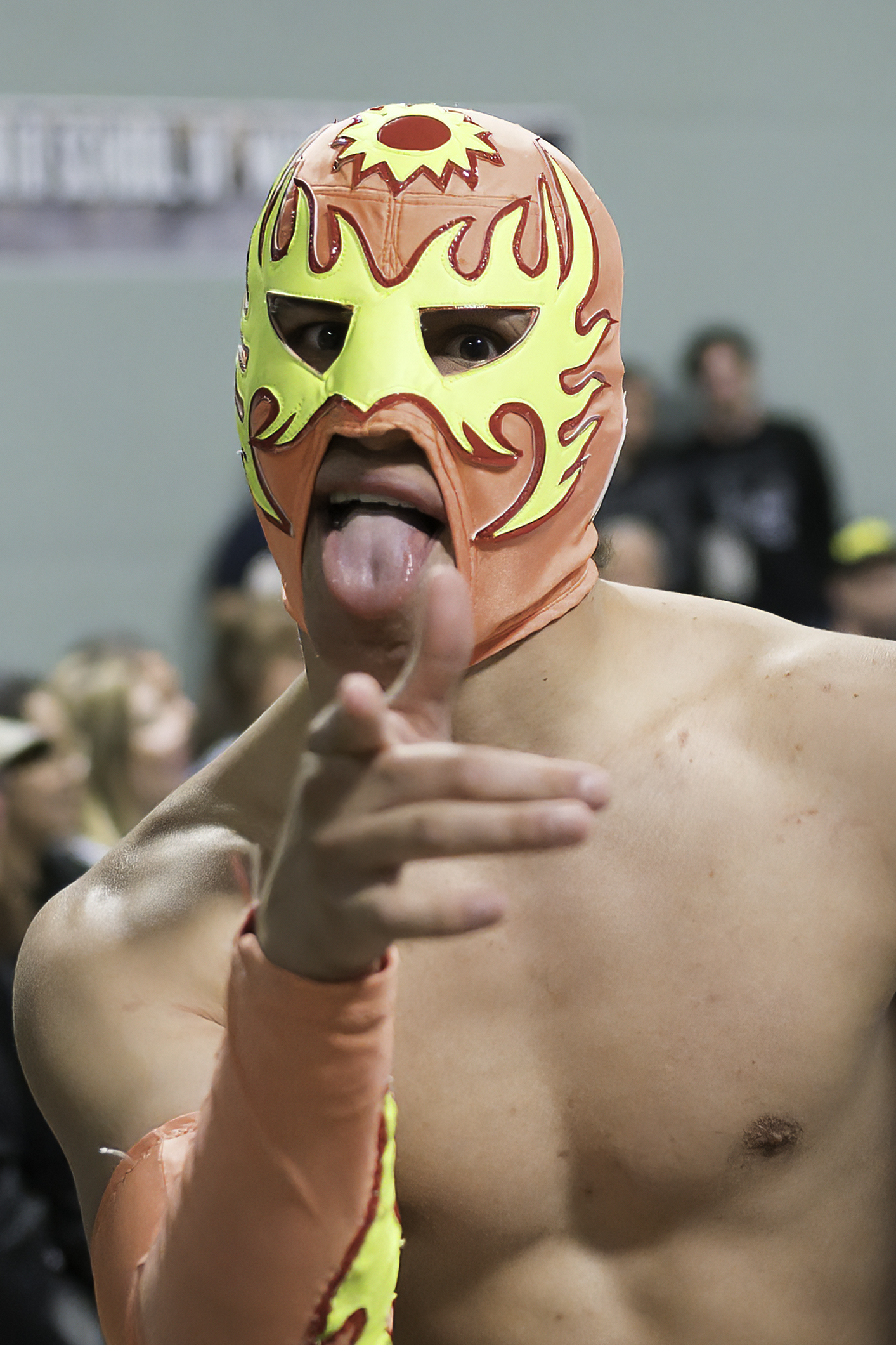
Fuego del Sol during his masked era.

Del Sol made regular appearances at AEW Dark and AEW Dark: Elevation throughout All Elite Wrestling's residency at Daily's Place during the COVID-19 pandemic. His first appearance was on June 9, when he teamed with Low Rida in a losing effort against SCU (Frankie Kazarian and Scorpio Sky). His run resulted in a 34 match losing streak, which was broken on July 6, 2021, where he teamed with Marko Stunt to defeat Ryzin and Baron Black. Despite his record, Del Sol gained a significant fan base, largely due to his inclusion on the vlog of his friend and fellow wrestler, Sammy Guevara. On August 13, 2021, Del Sol made his Rampage debut in an AEW TNT Championship match, losing to Miro. Following the match, Sammy Guevara offered him a contract and announced that he had joined the main roster. Del Sol would then purchase a new car which he would ultimately lose to Miro on September 17, in a Championship vs. Car match. On the September 29 episode of Dynamite Del Sol interfered in Guevara's match against Miro, resulting in Guevara winning the championship. On March 16, Del Sol teamed with Bear Country in a loss to the House of Black on Dynamite. Fuego Del Sol made his final contracted AEW appearance on the February 20, 2023 AEW Dark, where he lost to Juice Robinson. On June 22, 2023, he announced he had left AEW.

Fuego Del Sol made a surprise appearance on the August 17, 2024 episode of Rampage in a loss to Roderick Strong.

=== Game Changer Wrestling (2025–present) ===
On April 18, 2025, at Game Changer Wrestling’s Joey Janela's Spring Break 9, Fuego lost a mask vs. career match against Atticus Cogar, unmasking, and leaving his boots in the ring, teasing a possible retirement. However, on May 3 at GCW Crazy, he made his return without a mask under his real name, and turned heel.

On August 15, 2026 at GCW Homecoming Weekend: Night 1, Orso and Sam Stackhouse defeated Bustah and the Brain (Alec Price and Jordan Oliver) to win the GCW World Tag Team Championship.

== Personal life ==
Orso resides in Oklahoma City. Prior to his career as a professional wrestler, Orso originally competed as a backyard wrestler, under the name Kage, and made a YouTube channel called KBW Wrestling,."KBW" standing for "Kids Backyard Wrestling". In April 2022, Orso underwent surgery due to a mouth infection.

== Championships and accomplishments ==
- 3XWrestling
  - 3XWrestling Heavyweight Championship (2 times, current)
- Flashback Pro Wrestling
  - Mountain West Championship (1 time, inaugural)
- Imperial Wrestling Revolution
  - IWR Revolutionary Champion (1 time)
- Game Changer Wrestling
  - GCW World Tag Team Championship (1 time, current) – with Sam Stackhouse
- Pro Wrestling Illustrated
  - Ranked No. 269 of the top 500 singles wrestlers in the PWI 500 in 2026
- Pro Wrestling Junkie
  - PWJ Champion (1 time, current)
- River City Wrestling
  - RCW International Championship (1 time, current)
- Sabotage Wrestling
  - Sabotage Champion (1 time)
- Texoma Pro Wrestling
  - Texoma Pro Okhlahoma Champion (1 time)
- The Wrestling Revolver
  - Revolver Texas Championship (1 time, current)

== Luchas de Apuestas record ==
Winner (wager)	Loser (wager)	Location	Event	Date	Notes
Atticus Cogar (career)	Fuego Del Sol (mask)	Las Vegas, NV	Joey Janela's Spring Break 9	April 8, 2025	
