= Big Bill (wrestler) =

American professional wrestler (born 1986)

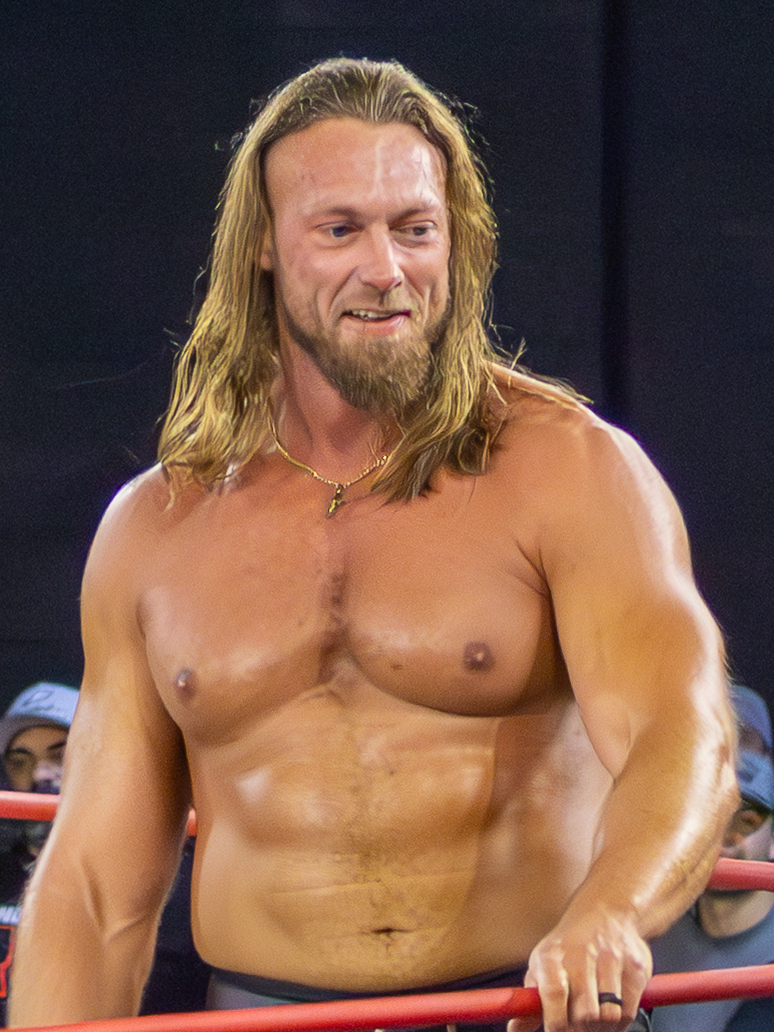
- Bill in 2025

Personal information
- Born: William Morrissey; August 16, 1986 (age 40) Queens, New York, U.S.
- Education: New York University
- Spouse: Lexy Nair (m. 2024)

Professional wrestling career
- Ring name(s): Big Bill; Big Bill Young; Big Cass; Big Cazz; CaZXL; Colin Cassady; Erik "The Red" Wood; W. Morrissey
- Billed height: 7 ft 0 in (213 cm)
- Billed weight: 276 lb (125 kg)
- Billed from: Queens, New York
- Trained by: Johnny Rodz; WWE Performance Center
- Debut: August 15, 2009

William Morrissey (born August 16, 1986) is an American professional wrestler. He has been signed to WWE since July 2026, where he performs on the Raw brand under the ring name Big Cass.

In WWE, he first appeared under the ring name Colin Cassady and came to prominence for his partnership with Enzo Amore, whom he teamed with from 2013 to 2017; they won the NXT Year-End Award for Tag Team of the Year in 2015. He was brought up to the Raw brand in 2016 and later moved to the SmackDown brand in 2018 before being released by the company later that year. After leaving WWE, he joined Impact Wrestling in 2021 as W. Morrissey, and All Elite Wrestling (AEW) in 2022 as Big Bill, where he is a former one-time AEW World Tag Team Champion with Ricky Starks. He departed AEW in July 2026 and re-signed with WWE later that month.

== Early life ==
William Morrissey was born on August 16, 1986 in the Glendale neighborhood of New York City's Queens borough. He attended Archbishop Molloy High School and served as a peer tutor, homeless shelter volunteer, and National Honor Society member. He played basketball in his senior year and was featured in the Catholic High School Athletic Association Senior Classic All-Star game. After graduating from high school, he received a scholarship to attend New York University (NYU). (Note: This scholarship was not an athletic scholarship; NYU is a member of NCAA Division III, which prohibits its members from awarding financial aid based on athletic ability.) He entered the pre-medical track before shifting to economics. While attending NYU, he played as a center for the NYU Violets from the 2005–2006 and 2008–2009 seasons. He co-captained the team for his final season. After graduating from NYU, Morrissey founded a ticket brokerage specializing in events held at Madison Square Garden and Yankee Stadium.

== Professional wrestling career ==
=== Early career (2009–2011) ===
Morrissey trained as a professional wrestler at Johnny Rodz's professional wrestling school in Brooklyn, New York. He debuted in Rodz's World of Unpredictable Wrestling (WUW) promotion on May 30, 2009, under the ring name Big Bill Young with the gimmick of a cowboy, accompanying his storyline uncle Billy Walker to the ring. His first match in WUW and in his career as a whole was on August 15, 2009, and he went on to wrestle a number of matches for the promotion before signing with WWE in mid-2011.

=== WWE (2011–2018) ===
==== Florida Championship Wrestling (2011–2012) ====
In June 2011, Morrissey signed with Florida Championship Wrestling (FCW), which was WWE's developmental territory at the time. Morrissey made his first televised FCW appearance in July 2011, portraying the dean of the University of Florida. Morrissey wrestled his first televised match under the ring name of Colin Cassady on the September 4, 2011, episode of FCW TV in a disqualification loss to Richie Steamboat. Cassady found no immediate success, losing matches for the rest of 2011 and in early 2012. Cassady scored his first win on the March 11 episode of FCW TV, defeating Kenneth Cameron. Cassady's final FCW TV match was on July 7 in a win against Aiden English. WWE rebranded its developmental territory, FCW, into NXT in August 2012.

==== Teaming with Enzo Amore (2013–2017) ====
Cassady debuted on NXT television on June 5, 2013, with a loss to Mason Ryan. Cassady then formed a villainous tag team with Enzo Amore, who had also previously lost to Ryan, and they labelled themselves "the realest guys in the room". In real life, Cassady first met Amore at the age of 15, when they played basketball together at West Fourth Street Courts in Manhattan, New York. Ryan defeated Amore and Cassady in consecutive singles matches, but lost to them in a handicap match. Ryan ultimately had the last laugh when he caused Amore and Cassady to be attacked by Tons of Funk (Brodus Clay and Tensai). Amore and Cassady then feuded with Sylvester Lefort and his stable of Alexander Rusev and Scott Dawson, turning them face in the process. On the September 25 episode of NXT, Amore and Cassady participated in a gauntlet match for a future title shot at the NXT Tag Team Championship; they started the match and defeated Tyler Breeze and CJ Parker, then beat Rusev and Dawson, before falling to their final opponents, The Ascension (Conor O'Brian and Rick Victor). Amore suffered a legit broken leg in November 2013, which led Cassady to try his hand at singles competition, feuding with Aiden English. Amore returned on the June 26, 2014, episode of NXT, saving Cassady from an attack from Sylvester Lefort and Marcus Louis.

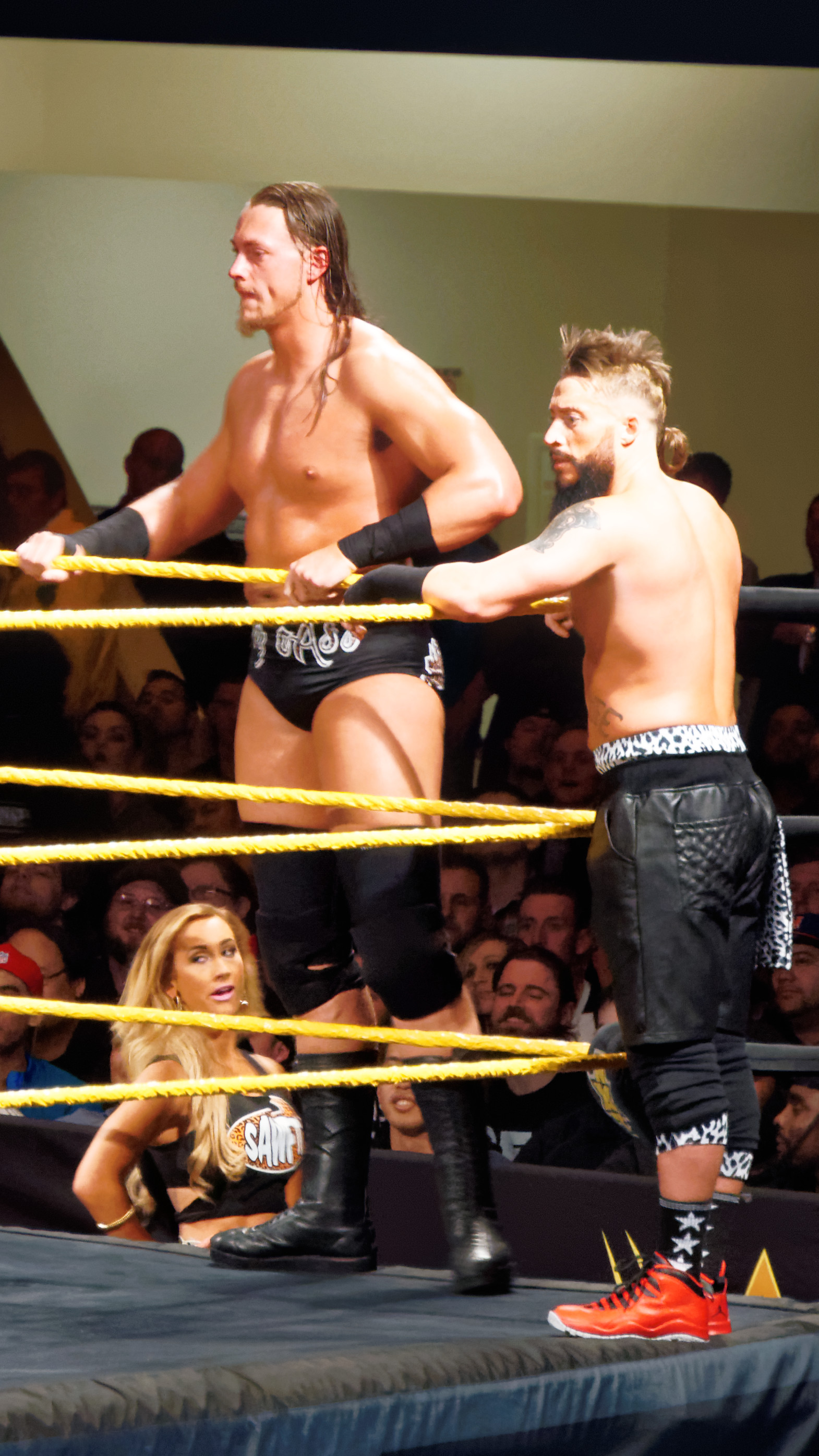
Cassady (left) and Enzo Amore during a live event in 2015

In early August, Amore and Cassady participated in a NXT Tag Team Championship number one contenders tournament, and they defeated Jason Jordan and Tye Dillinger in the first round, but were eliminated by The Vaudevillains (Aiden English and Simon Gotch) in the second round. Lefort and Louis then renewed their rivalry with Amore and Cassady by attacking them and shaving Amore's beard and, as a result, Amore challenged Lefort to a match with the loser's hair as forfeit at NXT TakeOver: Fatal 4-Way on September 11, where Amore won the match, but Lefort ran away, leaving his partner Louis to lose his hair at the hands of Amore and Cassady. Amore and Cassady proceeded to form an alliance with the debuting Carmella after the duo had accidentally cost Carmella her hairdressing job as per the storyline, causing her to demand to get a job as a wrestler. Carmella had her televised in-ring debut on the October 16 episode of NXT. In March 2015, Amore and Cassady began a rivalry with then NXT Tag Team Champions Blake and Murphy, with the champions insulting Amore and Cassady while attempting to woo Carmella. Amore and Cassady defeated The Lucha Dragons (Kalisto and Sin Cara) in a number one contender's match for a title opportunity against Blake and Murphy. Amore and Cassady received their title match at NXT TakeOver: Unstoppable, but they lost after Alexa Bliss interfered. At NXT TakeOver: London, Amore and Cassady challenged Dash and Dawson for the NXT Tag Team Championship in a losing effort. They were granted another title opportunity against Dash and Dawson in March 2016 at Roadblock, which Amore and Cassady lost.

On the Raw after WrestleMania 32, Amore and Cassady made their main roster debuts and confronted The Dudley Boyz. On the April 14 episode of SmackDown, Amore and Cassady defeated The Ascension in their main roster debut match, advancing in the WWE Tag Team Championship number one contenders tournament. In the finals, Amore and Cassady faced The Vaudevillains at Payback, with the match ending in a no contest after Amore suffered a legitimate concussion during the match. In May 2016, Cassady's ring name was changed to Big Cass. On the June 6 episode of Raw, during the match between Enzo and Cass and The Vaudevillains, Cass witnessed English attempting to injure Enzo in a similar manner of what Gotch did to him at Payback. This led to Cass attacking The Vaudevillains, including executing an East River Crossing on Gotch. At Money in the Bank, Enzo and Cass competed in a fatal four-way tag team match also involving The New Day, Luke Gallows and Karl Anderson and The Vaudevillains for the WWE Tag Team Championship, which they lost. On the July 4 episode of Raw, Enzo and Cass helped John Cena from an attack by The club, involving themselves in the feud between Cena and The club. At Battleground, Enzo and Cass teamed with Cena to defeat The Club in a six-man tag team match.

At the 2016 WWE draft on July 19, Enzo and Cass were drafted to the Raw brand. Following Battleground, Enzo and Cass feuded with Chris Jericho and Kevin Owens, losing to them at SummerSlam. On the August 22 episode of Raw, Cass defeated United States Champion Rusev by countout to qualify for the fourway elimination match for the WWE Universal Championship. In that match, the biggest of his career, which also included Kevin Owens, Roman Reigns and Seth Rollins, Cass was eliminated by Owens, marking the first time he was pinned on the main roster. On the November 7 episode of Raw, Enzo and Cass joined Team Raw for the ten-on-ten Survivor Series tag team elimination match at Survivor Series, which Team Raw won. Afterwards, Enzo and Cass started a rivalry with Rusev. On the December 5 episode of Raw, Enzo was lured into a trap by Lana and Rusev. Big Cass lost to Rusev via countout on the Roadblock: End of the Line kickoff show. Cass lost a handicap match against Rusev and Jinder Mahal before teaming up with Enzo to defeat the duo twice, ending the feud. Cass entered the 2017 Royal Rumble match at number 1 and was eliminated by Braun Strowman. At Fastlane, Enzo and Cass unsuccessfully challenged Luke Gallows and Karl Anderson for the Raw Tag Team Championship. At WrestleMania 33, Enzo and Cass faced Gallows and Anderson, Cesaro and Sheamus and the returning Hardy Boyz in a fatal four-way ladder match for the Raw Tag Team Championship, with the Hardy Boyz emerging victorious.

==== Singles competition (2017–2018) ====
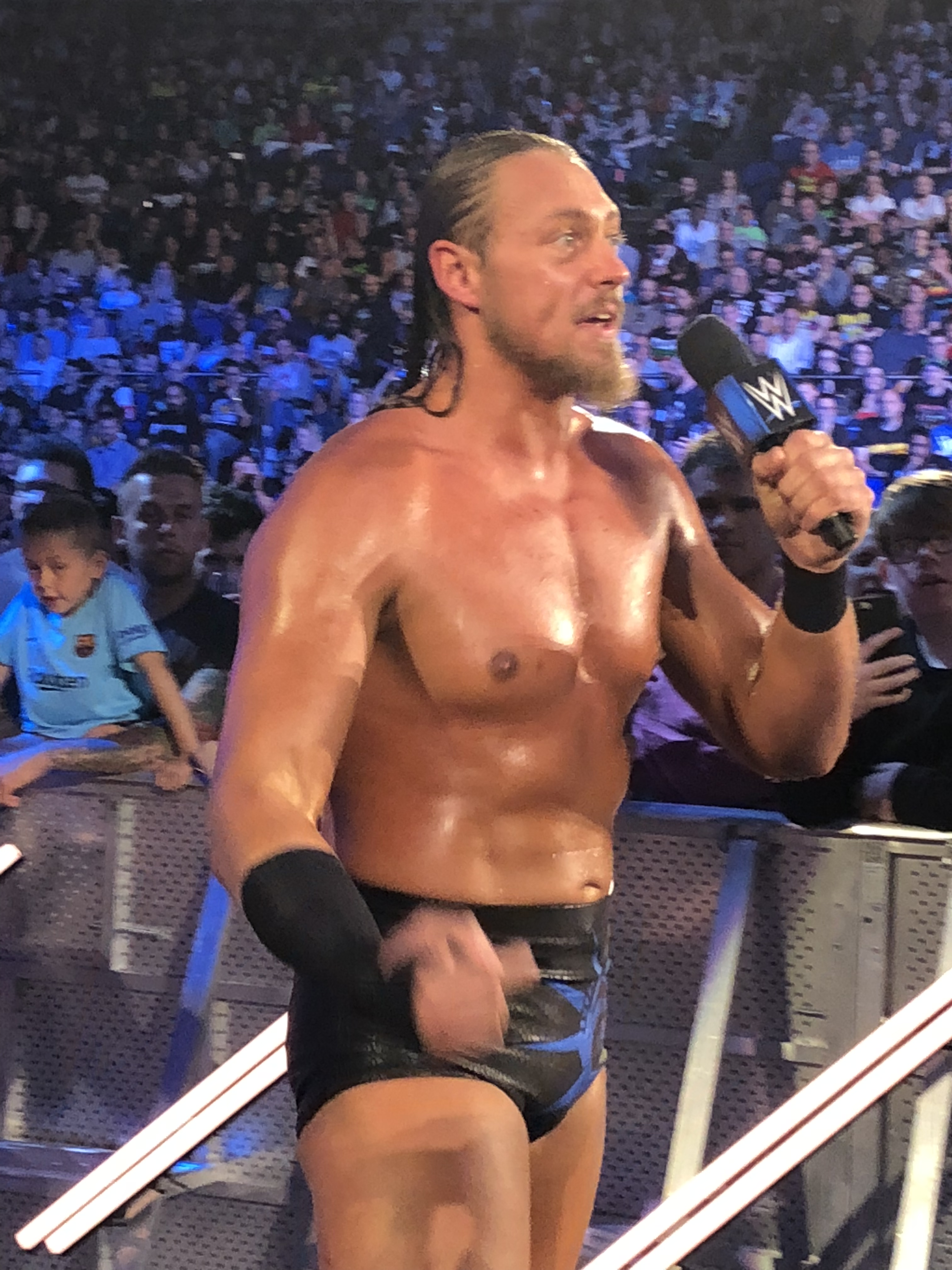
Big Cass in May 2018

On the Raw following Extreme Rules, Cass was mysteriously attacked in the same way Enzo Amore had been before. The following weeks, Cass accused Big Show of being his attacker, which Big Show denied. On the June 19 episode of Raw, it was revealed that Cass was behind the attacks on Amore and that he faked his own attack to lure away suspicion. Cass admitted to this, expressing his frustration during his time teaming with Amore, and attacked him with a big boot, disbanding the team and turning heel. On July 9 at Great Balls of Fire, he defeated Amore. The following night on Raw, Cass was attacked by Big Show, this action sparked a feud between Cass and Big Show. On July 31 episode of Raw, Cass defeated Big Show by disqualification when Amore attacked Cass during the match. At SummerSlam, Cass defeated Big Show with Amore being suspended above the ring in a shark cage. The next night on Raw, Cass suffered a legitimate knee injury, a torn ACL, during a Brooklyn Street Fight against Amore. Cass underwent surgery and was out of action for eight months.

Cass returned during the 2018 Superstar Shake-up, which moved him to SmackDown. On the April 17, 2018, episode of SmackDown, he interrupted the main event and attacked Daniel Bryan. The following week on SmackDown, Cass would take Bryan's spot as the guest on Miz TV, where it would be later revealed that Cass had attacked Bryan backstage. At Greatest Royal Rumble, Cass would enter the 50-man Royal Rumble match at number 49, where he would eliminate Bryan, lasting until the final two before being eliminated by Braun Strowman. At the Backlash pay-per-view, Cass was defeated by Bryan after submitting to the Yes Lock, only for Cass to attack Bryan after the match. On the May 29 episode of SmackDown, he would unsuccessfully wrestle against Bryan and Samoa Joe in a triple threat Money in the Bank qualifying match after Joe applied the Coquina Clutch on Bryan. At Money in the Bank, Cass lost to Bryan again in a singles match via submission. This would be his last match with the WWE, as he was released on June 19, 2018. According to Sports Illustrated, Morrissey's release was due to behavioral issues including public intoxication during a WWE tour and disobeying direct orders from Vince McMahon, in particular relating to the handling of an angle involving an attack on a little person who was impersonating Daniel Bryan on the May 1 episode of SmackDown.

Morrisey has since spoken about his departure from the company, citing depression, anxiety and an alcohol addiction the main factors in his exit.

=== Independent circuit (2018–2021) ===
On August 2, Big Time Wrestling announced that Morrissey, now known as Big Cazz (later changed to Big C), would make his wrestling return after the 90-day no-compete clause in his WWE contract was expired on September 21. He appeared at a BTW event on October 5, cutting a promo, hostilely addressing the fans, thus cementing himself as a heel. On December 1, Big Cass wrestled for Tommy Dreamer's House of Hardcore 51 under the name Big Ca$$, losing to MVP. Morrissey also made an appearance at House of Hardcore 52 on December 8, but during the show's intermission was rushed to a hospital after suffering a seizure (see personal life).

On April 6, 2019, Morrissey, alongside former tag partner Enzo Amore, appeared at the G1 Supercard at Madison Square Garden. Following a tag team match involving Ring of Honor and New Japan Pro-Wrestling talent, the two jumped the barricade and attacked several wrestlers. The broadcast cameras cut away from the incident to indicate a legitimate outside attack, but it was later reported the angle was a worked shoot. However, following the angle, the duo were not booked for any following shows and the incident was never mentioned again.

On June 15, 2019, Morrissey, under the ring name of CaZXL, made his debut for Northeast Wrestling (NEW), where he was accompanied by Arndt, now known as nZo. Caz then issued an open challenge to anyone on the roster. Jon Moxley would answer the challenge and later defeat him in a match. Morrissey was inactive from wrestling from September 2019 to February 2021, and returned to wrestling at a Lariato Pro Wrestling event where he reunited with nZo.

=== Impact Wrestling (2021–2022) ===
On April 25, 2021, at Rebellion, as W. Morrissey, he made his Impact Wrestling debut as the surprise replacement for Eric Young in Violent by Design's match against Chris Sabin, Eddie Edwards, James Storm, and Willie Mack. Morrissey picked up the win for his team by pinning Mack. As a result, Morrissey began feuding with Mack, defeating him in a singles match at Under Siege and a no disqualification match on the June 10 episode of Impact!. As a result, Morrissey got embroiled in a feud with Mack's ally Rich Swann, whom he defeated at Against All Odds. Morrisey began his next rivalry with Eddie Edwards, whom he defeated in their first singles encounter at Slammiversary. However, Morrissey lost to Edwards in a hardcore match at Homecoming. At Victory Road, Morrissey and Moose defeated Edwards and Sami Callihan. On the September 30 episode of Impact!, Morrissey lost to Edwards in a street fight to end the rivalry.

At Bound for Glory, Morrissey competed in the Call Your Shot Gauntlet match which was won by Moose. Morrissey would then begin feuding with Matt Cardona, whom he defeated at Turning Point. Towards the end of 2021, Morrissey became embroiled in a storyline with Moose over the Impact World Championship. At Hard to Kill on January 8, 2022, Morrissey failed to win the title in a triple threat match, also involving Matt Cardona, with Moose pinning Cardona to retain the title. The following week, Scott D'Amore granted Morrissey a one-on-one title match with Moose at No Surrender on February 19. During the storyline, Morrissey transitioned to a babyface character. Morrissey failed to win the title from Moose at the event.

At Rebellion, Morrissey and Jordynne Grace competed in an Eight-Team Elimination Challenge for the Impact World Tag Team Championship which was won by Violent By Design. On the June 2 episode of Impact!, Morrissey teamed with PCO in a loss to Moose and Steve Maclin. This would be his last match in the company, as it was reported that Morrissey had departed Impact Wrestling.

=== All Elite Wrestling (2022–2026) ===
==== The Firm (2022–2023) ====
On the May 4, 2022, episode of Dynamite, Morrissey made his debut in All Elite Wrestling (AEW) as a heel character, serving as MJF's pick for Wardlow's mystery opponent. Wardlow would defeat Morrissey by pinfall. In August 2022, Morrissey would sign a full time contract with AEW, and have his ring name changed to Big Bill. Big Bill began his AEW tenure as a member of Stokely Hathaway's stable, known as The Firm, but in spring 2023 the group quietly broke up, with Big Bill then going his own way.

==== Alliance with Ricky Starks (2023–2024) ====
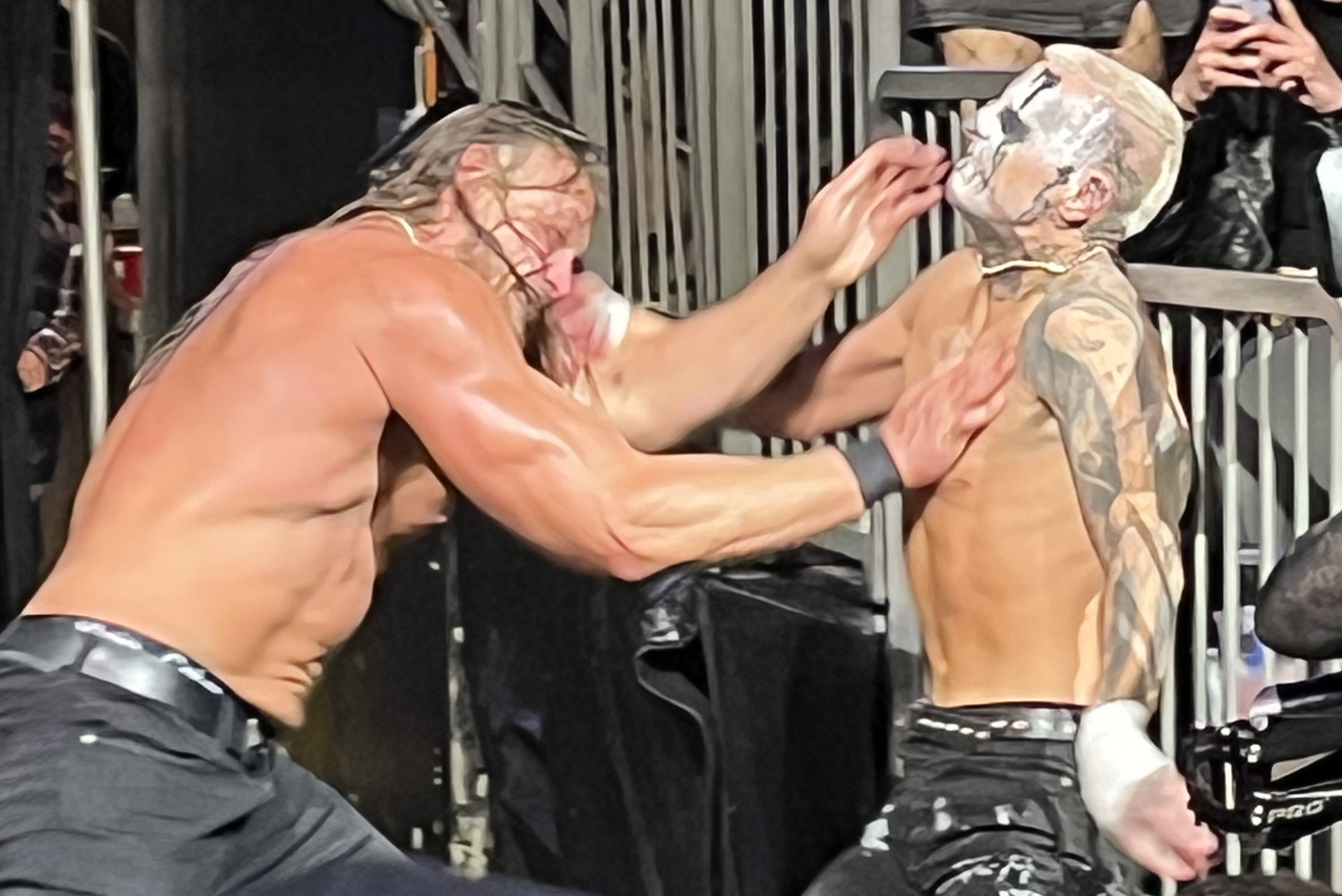
Big Bill delivering a chop to Darby Allin in February 2024

In August 2023, Big Bill and Ricky Starks formed a partnership after Starks obtained a manager's license and began managing Big Bill in order to continue appearing in AEW after being (kayfabe) suspended by the company. On the October 7 episode of Collision, Big Bill and Starks defeated FTR (Dax Harwood and Cash Wheeler) for the AEW World Tag Team Championship. This marked his first championship reign in a major wrestling promotion. on the October 21 episode of Collision, Big Bill and Starks defeated Blackpool Combat Club (Claudio Castagnoli and Wheeler Yuta) to retain the titles.

At Full Gear, Big Bill and Starks defeated La Facción Ingobernable (Rush and Dralístico), FTR and Kings of the Black Throne (Malakai Black and Brody King) in a ladder match to retain the titles. At AEW Battle of the Belts IX, Big Bill and Starks defeated Le Sex Gods (Chris Jericho and Sammy Guevara) in a Street Fight to retain the titles. Big Bill and Starks lost the titles to Sting and Darby Allin in a tornado tag team match on the February 7, 2024 episode of Dynamite, ending their reign at 123 days.

==== The Learning Tree and Paid in Full (2024–2026) ====
In May 2024, Big Bill joined The Learning Tree stable headed by FTW Champion Chris Jericho, and on the June 12 episode of Dynamite he was dubbed "The Redwood". In June 2024 at Forbidden Door, Bill teamed with Jericho and Jeff Cobb in a losing effort to Hook, Katsuyori Shibata, and Samoa Joe. On the November 23 episode of Dynamite Bill assisted Jericho to defeat Mark Briscoe in a Ladder War for the ROH World Championship.

In January 2025, Bill began a feud with Powerhouse Hobbs. On the February 20 episode of Dynamite, Bill was defeated by Hobbs in a Street Fight. On April 6 at Dynasty, Bill and stablemate Bryan Keith unsuccessfully challenged The Hurt Syndicate (Bobby Lashley and Shelton Benjamin) for the AEW World Tag Team Championship. On the following episode of Dynamite, The Learning Tree would disband as Jericho would blame losing the ROH World Championship on both Bill and Keith, before saying it's best that he leaves for a while until Bill and Keith make a change.

After being abandoned by Jericho, Keith and Bill would continue to operate as a tag team, later adopting the name "Paid in Full". On the February 7, 2026, episode of Collision, Paid in Full and Grizzled Young Veterans (James Drake and Zack Gibson) lost to The Rascalz (Dezmond Xavier and Zachary Wentz), Eddie Kingston and Ortiz in an eight-man Parking Lot Brawl, which was Bill's last match in AEW. Bill departed AEW in July 2026 upon the expiration of his contract, ending his four-year tenure with the company.

=== Return to WWE (2026–present) ===
Immediately after departing AEW, Morissey signed a deal to return to WWE. In July 2026, a series of vignettes began airing on Raw, teasing his return. He made his return under the Big Cass ring name on the August 3, 2026, episode of Raw, where he attacked Je'Von Evans, thus establishing himself as a heel. On the August 24 episode of Raw, Cass defeated Evans in his return match. After failing to qualify for the Money in the Bank ladder match, Cass aligned himself with Ethan Page.

== Other media ==
Morrissey, as Big Cass, is a playable character in the video games WWE 2K16, WWE 2K17, and WWE 2K18.

== Personal life ==
Morrissey was in a relationship with fellow wrestler Leah Van Dale, known as Carmella, until 2017.

Morrissey met his future tag team partner Eric Arndt, known as Enzo Amore, when they played basketball together at the Cage in Manhattan, New York, nearly 10 years before they reunited in WWE in August 2013. Their 15-year friendship ended after Morrissey suffered a legitimate knee injury and Arndt was publicly critical of him for not finishing their match after the injury. The two have since reconciled. During their time in Florida Championship Wrestling (FCW), Morrisey roomed with fellow wrestler Jonathan Good, known as Dean Ambrose in WWE. The two lived together until 2014 while Ambrose had already joined the main roster. Morrisey said he enjoyed living with Ambrose, calling it "the best [time] of his life."

On December 8, 2018, Morrissey suffered an epileptic seizure while at his merchandise table during a House of Hardcore event. He was treated by medical personnel while Tommy Dreamer and Bubba Ray Dudley were by his side. He was responsive and eventually taken to the hospital. Following his seizure, with the help of pro wrestler Diamond Dallas Page, Morissey became sober and got treated for depression. On September 14, 2019, Morrissey was involved in an incident backstage at a WrestlePro independent show where he allegedly confronted and tried to fight Joey Janela, who was involved in an incident with Morrissey's tag team partner, Eric Arndt, months earlier. He also allegedly confronted and spat in the face of independent wrestler Pat Buck. According to witnesses, Buck retaliated by punching Morrissey in the face. Morrissey was kicked out of the building, and police officers were called after he refused to leave. No charges were filed. In 2021, both Morrissey and Janela made amends.

In April 2021, Morrissey began a relationship with AEW interviewer Lexy Nair, who is also the stepdaughter of Diamond Dallas Page. They got engaged on December 24, 2022. They got married in December 2024 in Mexico.

== Championships and accomplishments ==
- All Elite Wrestling
  - AEW World Tag Team Championship (1 time) – with Ricky Starks
- Pro Wrestling Illustrated
  - Ranked No. 94 of the top 500 singles wrestlers in the PWI 500 in 2017
- Rolling Stone
  - Ranked No. 10 of the 10 best WWE wrestlers of 2016 with Enzo Amore
- World of Unpredictable Wrestling
  - WUW North American Championship (1 time)
- Wrestling Observer Newsletter
  - Worst Gimmick (2024) as part of The Learning Tree
- WWE
  - NXT Year-End Award for Tag Team of the Year (2015) with Enzo Amore
