= Swerve Strickland =

American professional wrestler (born 1990)

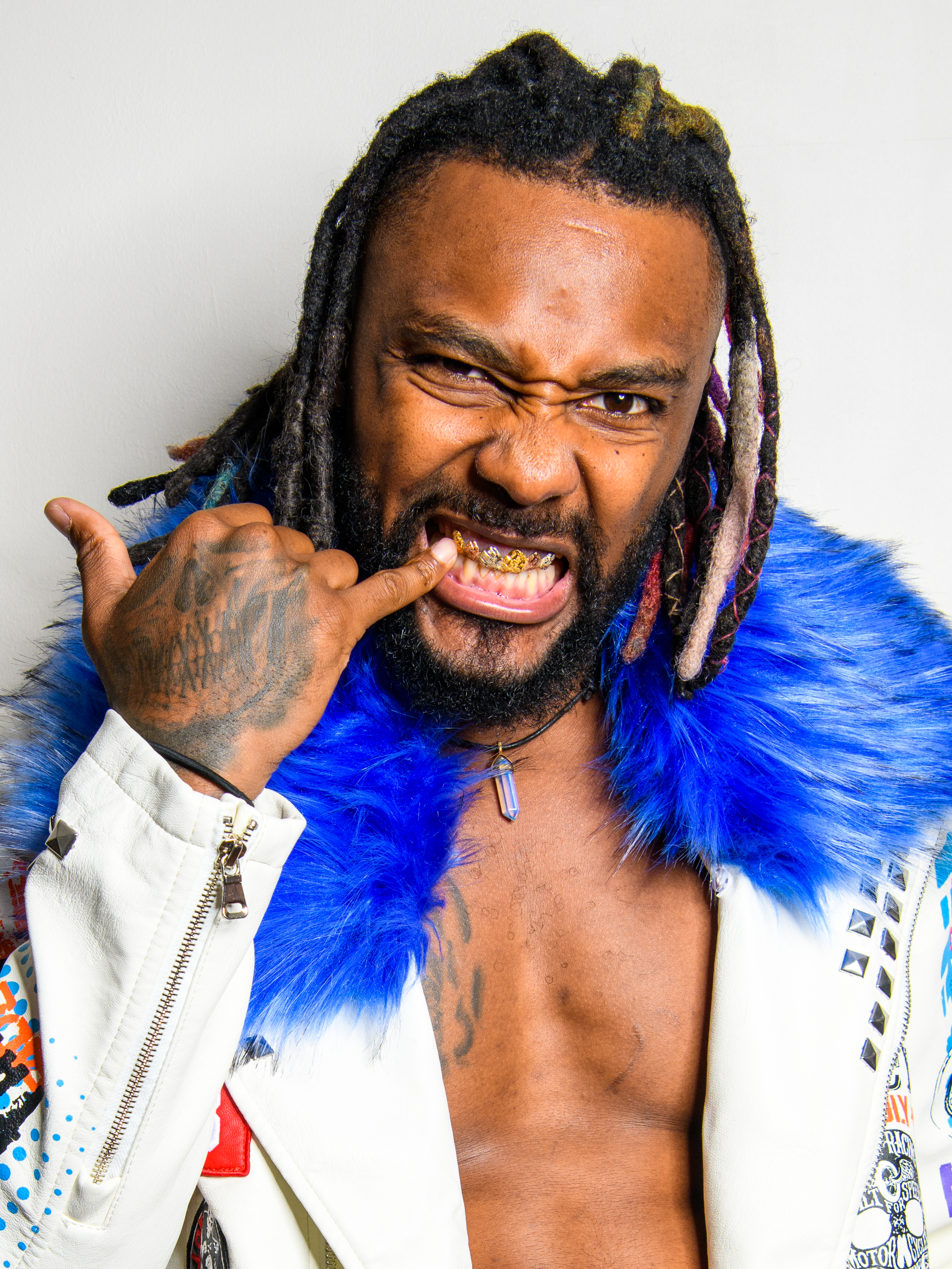
- Strickland in 2022

Personal information
- Born: Stephon Strickland; September 30, 1990 (age 36) Tacoma, Washington, U.S.
- Children: 3
- Relative: Fred Strickland (cousin)

Professional wrestling career
- Ring names: Isaiah "Swerve" Scott; Killshot; Lt. Jermaine Strickland; Shane Strickland; Swerve Strickland; SW3RVE; SW3RVE the Realest
- Billed height: 6 ft 1 in (185 cm)
- Billed weight: 240 lb (109 kg)
- Billed from: Tacoma, Washington
- Trained by: Combat Zone Wrestling; D. J. Hyde; Ground Xero Wrestling
- Debut: 2009
- Military service
- Allegiance: United States
- Branch: Reserve
- Service years: 2008–2015

Stephon Strickland (born September 30, 1990), better known by his ring name Swerve Strickland, is an American professional wrestler and rapper. As of March 2022, he is signed to All Elite Wrestling (AEW), where he is one-third of the AEW World Trios Champions with The New Level (Austin Creed and Kofi) in their record-tying second reign as a team.

Strickland began his career in 2008 as Shane Strickland, working for several independent promotions until 2019 such as Major League Wrestling (MLW), Evolve Wrestling, and Combat Zone Wrestling (CZW). He is a one-time MLW World Heavyweight Champion, one-time Evolve Champion, and one-time CZW World Heavyweight Champion. From 2014 until 2018, he performed in Lucha Underground as a masked wrestler named Killshot. In 2019, he signed a developmental contract with WWE, where he worked as Isaiah "Swerve" Scott in NXT and was part of the Hit Row stable; he won the NXT North American Championship once and was soon promoted to the main roster on SmackDown, but was released in November 2021.

Under the ring name Swerve Strickland, he signed with AEW in March 2022, going on to become a one-time AEW World Champion, a one-time AEW World Tag Team Champion (with Keith Lee), and a two-time AEW World Trios Champion (with Austin Creed and Kofi), subsequently being the third AEW Triple Crown Champion. He was the leader of the Mogul Embassy stable until May 2024. He also headlined multiple AEW pay-per-view events, including AEW's major flagship annual event, All In.

== Early life ==
Stephon Strickland was born in Tacoma, Washington, on September 30, 1990. He is the cousin of former NFL linebacker Fred Strickland. His father, who was a sergeant first class cook in the United States Army, moved the family to Germany when Strickland was two months old to live on a U.S. military base in Frankfurt. Strickland spent the first seven years of his life in Germany. The family later returned to the U.S. and settled in Mount Joy, Pennsylvania, where he attended Donegal High School. He danced in talent shows and excelled in football, basketball, and track and field.

Shortly after graduating high school, Strickland enlisted in the United States Army Reserve at the age of 17. He completed his United States Army Basic Training in South Carolina, then underwent 22 weeks of Advanced Individual Training at Fort Gordon in Augusta, Georgia. He was then stationed in York, Pennsylvania, where he served as a 25U Signal Support Systems Specialist for eight years. He left the Reserve in 2015.

== Professional wrestling career ==
=== Training and early career (2008–2012) ===
Strickland decided to become a professional wrestler when he was 18 years old. He began training at Ground Xero (Zero) Wrestling Training Academy in August 2008, doing so while still serving in the United States Army Reserve. He soon began getting bookings around the Maryland and Pennsylvania areas. He had Army Reserve commitments in York, Pennsylvania, which obliged him to wrestle only in that general area's independent circuit in the early years of his career. In September 2011, Strickland made his first appearance with the National Wrestling Alliance, losing to Phil Brown. In March 2012, he defeated Alex Payne in his debut for East Coast Wrestling Association. He would go to debut for World Xtreme Wrestling in a six-man match on September 15, 2012.

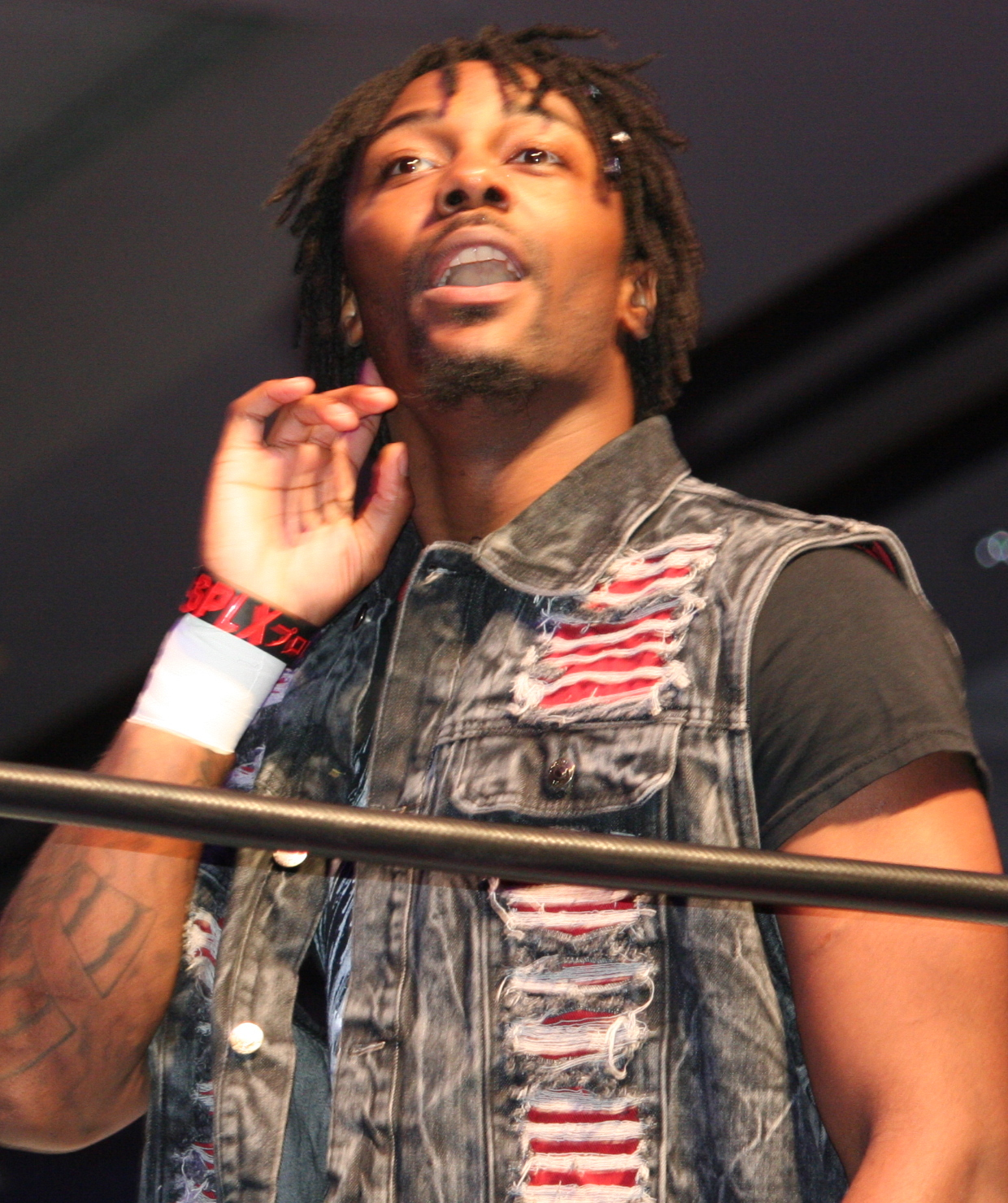
Strickland in March 2017

=== Combat Zone Wrestling (2012–2017, 2019) ===
Strickland made his Combat Zone Wrestling (CZW) debut on February 4, 2012, in a dark match. On March 10, 2012, at Aerial Assault, Strickland participated in the main event, a Best Of The Best 11 Qualifying Aerial Assault Elimination Match won by Samuray del Sol. On November 10, 2012, at Night of Infamy 11, Strickland participated in a CZW Wired TV Open Challenge, but was defeated by the champion A. R. Fox. At Best of the Best 12, Strickland participated in the Best of the Best tournament, but he was defeated in the first round by Alex Colon.

On September 14, 2013, at Down with the Sickness, Strickland participated in the main event a Chris Cash Memorial Fatal 4 Way Ladder match for the CZW Wired TV Championship, but the match was won by Colon. At Cage of Death XV, Colon defeated Strickland in a title match. On March 8, 2014, at High Stakes, Strickland defeated the CZW Wired Champion Devon Moore to win the title for the first time. At Best of the Best XIII, Strickland retained the title against Moore in a Ladder match.

Then, Strickland started a feud with Joe Gacy. At Dojo Wars 6, Strickland lost the title against Gacy. However, Strickland regained the title two weeks later at Dojo Wars 7. In October 2014, Strickland participated in the World Triangle Tournament, a tournament held by Westside Xtreme Wrestling, Combat Zone Wrestling and Big Japan Pro-Wrestling. Strickland ended with 3 point in the Block B. Finally, at Cage of Death XVI, Gacy defeated Strickland for the title. After a lengthy absence in which he wrestled for WXW in Germany, Strickland made a one-time appearance in 2015 in a victory over David Starr.

In 2016, Strickland had an acclaimed series of matches with Dezmond Xavier and in the 2017 Best of the Best tournament, he made it to the finals before losing to Dave Crist. In July that same year, he then went on to defeat Gacy, Lio Rush, and Davey Richards in a 4-way to win the CZW World Heavyweight Championship for the first time. He held on to the title until November before losing to Gacy, who then immediately lost the title to Rickey Shane Page. Page then challenged both men to a Cage Of Death match for the title, which Strickland was unsuccessful at winning. Strickland's final appearance in CZW was at CZW Twenty, in a victory against KC Navarro.

=== Independent circuit (2012–2019) ===
On May 5, 2012, Strickland made his debut for Evolve Wrestling, where he teamed with Latin Dragon to defeat DMC and Nate Carter. On August 4, 2018, Strickland defeated Matt Riddle to win the Evolve Championship at Evolve 108. At Evolve 114 he lost the championship to NXT's Fabian Aichner, ending his three-month reign. Strickland wrestled NXT's Kassius Ohno at Evolve 116 on November 10, 2018, in a losing effort. After not appearing for three months, Strickland returned to Evolve at Evolve 121 on February 15, 2019, to face NXT's Adam Cole. He would be defeated by Cole and the following night he would defeat A. R. Fox. He faced JD Drake at Evolve 126 for the WWN Championship in a match he lost.

In 2016, Strickland made his debut in Germany for Westside Xtreme Wrestling (wXw), taking part in the 16 Carat Gold tournament and later their World Tag Team League, which he won alongside David Starr. They beat many established teams such as, Angélico and Jack Evans, Ringkampf (Timothy Thatcher and Walter), Moustache Mountain (Tyler Bate and Trent Seven) and The Leaders of the New School (Marty Scurll and Zack Sabre Jr.). Shane Strickland would challenge Cody Rhodes, at the inaugural Defy event, Defy1 in a loss. During 2017's WrestleMania 33 three-day weekend, he wrestled seven matches for five different promotions, including four in one day. On August 25, 2018, Strickland appeared at Triplemanía XXVI. He and A. C. H. appeared at that event to represent Major League Wrestling through the MLW and AAA partnership. They were in a Four-way match for the AAA World Cruiserweight Championship. Strickland would fail to capture the championship. On March 23, 2019, Strickland competed for The Crash Lucha Libre in fatal-4-way for The Crash Cruiserweight Championship.

Strickland won the PCW Ultra Light Heavyweight Championship on March 26, 2018. Two months later at their next event he defended against Douglas James with Ricky Steamboat as the guest referee. He finished the year with successful defenses against Dragon Lee, Flip Gordon, Rey Horus and Darby Allin, among others. On December 7, 2018, Strickland defeated Pentagon Jr. for the PCW Ultra Heavyweight Championship, becoming a double champion as he was still holding the Light Heavyweight Championship. He would vacate the Light Heavyweight Championship shortly after, and he defended the Ultra Heavyweight Championship at their A2K19 event on January 18, 2019, against Brian Cage.

On March 9, 2019, Strickland gave a farewell speech at a DEFY Wrestling event, indicating he will soon be signing with a major company. At Wrestle Summit 2019, he appeared as PCW Ultra roster member. At the event he lost his PCW Ultra Heavyweight Championship to Mil Muertes. Following Wrestle Summit, Strickland revealed that on April 6, he will wrestle for Wrestling Revolver at WrestleCon's Pancakes and Piledrivers event. In the match, he teamed with Joe Gacy and Eddie Kingston to face-off against oVe, in what was promoted as his last match on the independent circuit.

=== Lucha Underground (2014–2018) ===
Strickland participated in El Rey Network professional wrestling television series Lucha Underground. Strickland became a central character on Lucha Underground, as one of a small group of characters to appear in every season. His friend Ricochet being on the show led to him sending Konnan some of his demo tapes in late 2014. This led to a tryout match with Willie Mack and him later being signed by the company. He portrayed the character of Lt. Jermaine Strickland, a military vet who carries dog tags to honor the memories of his fallen comrades and wrestled under a mask as Killshot. During the first season, he aligned with Big Ryck and Willie Mack and participated in a tournament for the LU Trios Championship, but they were defeated in the finales by the eventual winners Angélico, Son of Havoc and Ivelisse. Following the first season, Strickland asked head writer Chris DeJoseph if he could write some background and story for his character. This led to it having more military elements.

In Season 2, had a feud with Marty Martinez after Marty stole his dog tags after a match between them ended in a no contest. Their feud ended in a Weapon of Mass Destruction match, where Killshot defeated Martinez. After the match, Killshot started a storyline when he received a letter from Dante Fox, a former brother in arms who Killshot left for dead in battle. They faced each other at Ultima Lucha Tres Part I in a Hell of War match where Killshot won. ESPN called it "one of the most brutal contests to ever be televised in professional wrestling." Two weeks later, The Mack reunited Killshot and Fox and won the Trios Championship. During Season 4, Killshot had a feud with Son of Havoc which culminated at Ultima Lucha Cuatro in a mask vs mask match. After losing the match, Killshot surrendered his mask to Son of Havoc and revealed his identity as Lt. Jermaine Strickland. As he was leaving the temple, he apologized to Dante Fox and asked to be relieved of duty. Being granted permission, Killshot exited the Lucha Underground temple.

=== Major League Wrestling (2017–2019, 2022) ===
On October 5, 2017, Strickland debuted in the main event of Major League Wrestling's 2017 rebirth show One Shot by defeating Ricochet. On April 12, 2018, Strickland defeated Matt Riddle at one of MLW's first major shows, to win an eight-man tournament and the vacant MLW World Heavyweight Championship. He lost the title to wrestler Low Ki after Strickland had a few successful defenses, with his reign lasting 91 days. Following that he feuded with Sami Callihan, which ended in a street fight won by Strickland. They also participated in a War Games match in September 2018, where Callihan attacked Strickland during his entrance, removing him from the match. This was reportedly done to write him off television if contract negotiations changed.

On episode 32 of MLW's weekly program MLW Fusion, Strickland faced Low Ki in rematch for the Heavyweight title. However, after a distraction, Ki "ripped" out some of Strickland's hair and rolled him up for the win. After the match, Strickland grabbed a microphone and begun a worked shoot towards MLW management turning heel in the process. He mentioned owner Court Bauer and blamed management for his bad luck as of late. He ended the promo with, "As of right now, I am terminating my contract and I'm.." as his microphone got cut off. Strickland proceeded to throw trash at the MLW employees that were confronting him, he fliped off one of them and hopped the rail into the audience and left.

They followed this up two weeks later on Fusion with a scene of Strickland and Court Bauer arguing behind his closed office door. After this, it was stated he was "contractly obligated" to appear at the December 13, 2018, MLW event, Never Say Never. At the event he was defeated by CMLL luchador Rush. This match aired on MLW Fusion on January 18, 2019. Strickland opened the show with a heel promo disparaging the fans and the city until he was interrupted by Rush. This would be Strickland's last regular appearance in MLW. On January 15, 2019, Strickland stated on Twitter that he was now a free agent.

Strickland returned to MLW in March, 2022 at Intimidation Games, appearing as the mystery opponent for Myron Reed's MLW World Middleweight Championship in a losing effort, and aligning himself with Azteca Underground's Cesar Duran.

=== WWE (2019–2021) ===
On April 17, 2019, it was announced that he signed a contract with WWE and begun working at their Performance Center, and his ring name was changed to Isaiah "Swerve" Scott. He wrestled his debut match against Cameron Grimes, a dark match that took place before the May 1 NXT television tapings. In June, it was announced that Scott would compete in a tournament named NXT Breakout Tournament, where he made his debut on the July 3 episode of NXT, but lost to Cameron Grimes in the first round of the tournament. On the July 23 episode of 205 Live, he debuted on the brand by losing to Cruiserweight Champion Drew Gulak. At Worlds Collide on January 25, 2020, Scott challenged for the Cruiserweight Championship in a fatal four way match against Travis Banks, Jordan Devlin, and then-champion Angel Garza, but was unsuccessful.

On April 12, Scott was announced as a participant in a tournament to determine the interim NXT Cruiserweight Champion, representing Group B in the tournament, where he was defeated by Akira Tozawa and Gentleman Jack Gallagher, but was able to defeat El Hijo del Fantasma (who had also worked for Lucha Underground under the name King Cuerno), leaving him with one win in the tournament, thus failing to advance to the finals. Scott then began feuding with Cruiserweight Champion Santos Escobar, El Hijo del Fantasma's new ring name, after Scott claimed to be the only one who has pinned Escobar. On the August 26 episode of NXT, Scott challenged Escobar for the title but lost after Escobar hit him with a loaded mask. On the September 1 episode of NXT Super Tuesday, Scott and Breezango (Tyler Breeze and Fandango) defeated Legado del Fantasma in a Six-Man Street Fight after Scott once again pinned Escobar, thus earning Scott a title shot at NXT TakeOver: 31. At the event, he lost to Escobar.

Scott then entered the Dusty Rhodes Tag Team Classic tournament, where he was paired with Jake Atlas, but the two were eliminated from the tournament by the eventual winner MSK (Nash Carter and Wes Lee) and following the match, argued with one another. On the February 17, 2021, episode of NXT, Scott attacked Leon Ruff after losing a match to him, turning heel in the process. At NXT Takeover: Stand & Deliver, Scott would participated in a 6 Way match, where he eliminated Ruff and Cameron Grimes but would be last person eliminated in the match by Bronson Reed.

On the May 4 episode of NXT, Scott defeated Ruff in a Falls Count Anywhere match after A. J. Francis interfered on Scott's behalf. The following week, Scott was joined by Francis (who was now called Top Dolla), Tehuti Miles (now called Ashante "Thee" Adonis) and Briana Brandy (now B-Fab), forming the stable Hit Row. On the June 29 episode of NXT, Scott defeated Bronson Reed to win the NXT North American Championship, his first title in his WWE career. As part of the 2021 Draft, Scott along with the rest of Hit Row, were drafted to the SmackDown brand. On the October 12 episode of NXT, he defeated Santos Escobar to retain his NXT North American championship, only to lose to Carmelo Hayes, ending his 105-day reign. On November 4, B-Fab was released from her WWE contract, shortening the group. Two weeks later on November 18, Scott was released from his WWE contract along with Adonis and Dolla.

=== Return to the independent circuit (2022–present) ===
On February 13, 2022, Strickland made his return to DEFY Wrestling after three years, confronting Darby Allin and Nick Wayne. On October 8 at DEFY City of Thorns, Strickland defeated Christopher Daniels to become the new interim DEFY World Champion. On November 26 at DEFY Fightwave, Strickland won a six-way ladder match to become the undisputed DEFY World Champion, officially starting his third reign holding the title. On April 8, 2023 at DEFY The Realest, Strickland lost the title to Nick Wayne, ending his reign at 133 days. Strickland made an appearance at the House of Glory (HOG) event High Intensity on July 26, 2024, defeating Amazing Red.

=== All Elite Wrestling (2022–present) ===
==== Swerve In Our Glory and Mogul Affiliates (2022–2023) ====
On March 6, 2022, Strickland signed with All Elite Wrestling (AEW), debuting under the new name Swerve Strickland at the Revolution pay-per-view event. He made his in-ring debut for AEW on the March 11 episode of Rampage, defeating Tony Nese. The following week, Strickland aligned himself with Keith Lee in a feud with Team Taz (Powerhouse Hobbs and Ricky Starks). Strickland and Lee would then begin tag teaming, dubbing themselves "Swerve In Our Glory". In April 2022, Strickland made his debut for AEW's sister promotion, Ring of Honor (ROH), defeating Alex Zayne at Supercard of Honor XV.

At Dynamite: Fyter Fest Night 1 on July 13, Swerve In Our Glory defeated defending champions The Young Bucks and Team Taz in a Triple or Nothing match to win the AEW World Tag Team Championship. They had successful title defenses against the likes of The Lucha Brothers and the Gunn Club (Colten and Austin Gunn). They would then enter a three match series with The Acclaimed (Max Caster and Anthony Bowens), defeating them at All Out, losing the belts to them in a rematch at Dynamite: Grand Slam, and losing to them once more at Full Gear after Strickland slapped Lee when Lee refused to use pliers as a weapon, causing Lee to walk out on the match. The following month, at the ROH event Final Battle, Swerve In Our Glory faced Shane Taylor Promotions. During the match, Strickland followed suit, walking out on Lee after a sequence of friendly fire attacks between the two, causing Lee to narrowly defeat Shane Taylor Promotions.

On the December 21, 2022, edition of Dynamite, Strickland turned on Lee, forming a new stable, "Mogul Affiliates", with Parker Boudreaux, Granden Goetzman (Later named Trench), and the rapper Rick Ross. Strickland feuded with Lee until March 2023, when he and Boudreaux lost to Lee and Dustin Rhodes.

==== Mogul Embassy and AEW World Champion (2023–2024) ====
In April 2023, Mogul Affiliates merged with Prince Nana's stable The Embassy to create Mogul Embassy.

Strickland began a feud with Sting and Darby Allin, starting when Allin defeated Strickland on the April 12 edition of Dynamite. On May 28 at Double or Nothing, Stickland competed in the 21-man Blackjack Battle Royal for the AEW International Championship, but was lastly eliminated by Orange Cassidy, who retained the title. Strickland received a match for the title on the June 7 edition of Dynamite, but lost when he was defeated by Cassidy. After the match, Strickland and The Mogul Embassy attacked Cassidy only to be chased off by Allin and Sting. The following month, Strickland was forced to reteam with Keith Lee in the Blind Eliminator Tag Team Tournament, but the duo were quickly eliminated by Allin and Cassidy. The following week, Strickland defeated Allin's protege and rival on the independent scene Nick Wayne. On the July 26 edition of Dynamite, Strickland avenged his loss to Allin, by defeating him. The feud further intensified when Allin's ally, AR Fox betrayed Allin, joining The Mogul Embassy. On August 23, Strickland and Fox lost to Allin and Wayne, causing Strickland to kick Fox out of Mogul Embassy, ending their short term alliance, ahead of the duo's match against Allin and Sting at All In. Soon after, Christian Cage was announced as Fox's replacement as Strickland's partner at the event. On August 27, 2023, at All In, Strickland and Cage lost to Allin and Sting in a coffin match, after Strickland was shut in the coffin.

Strickland returned, for the first time since being placed in the coffin at All In, on the September 6 edition of Dynamite, confronting "Hangman" Adam Page. Strickland berated Page, claiming that if he was given the same opportunities as him, he would be the "first black AEW World Champion". Upon further mocking Page, Mogul Embassy member Brian Cage ambushed Page. The following week, Strickland once again confronted Page during his match with Brian Cage. Following Page's victory, Strickland challenged him to a match at WrestleDream on October 1. Before Page could respond, Cage attacked him, though he was saved by The Young Bucks. The feud intensified at Rampage: Grand Slam, where The Elite (Page and The Young Bucks) defeated Mogul Embassy (Brian Cage, Toa Liona and Bishop Kaun) to win the ROH World Six-Man Tag Team Championship. On the September 27 edition of Dynamite, Strickland and Page met in the ring for a contract signing to confirm their match at WrestleDream. The two insulted one another, leading to Page stabbing Strickland's hand with a pen. On October 1 at WrestleDream in Strickland's home state of Washington, Strickland defeated Page. On November 18 at Full Gear, Strickland defeated Page in a Texas Deathmatch. The match was acclaimed and but received backlash and some mainstream media attention for a moment in which Page cut open Strickland's forehead and drank his blood. Strickland stated that telling people to avoid watching the match would have the opposite effect, and compared it to telling children not to go and see "a new insane horror movie".

Strickland participated in the first Continental Classic tournament, where he finished joint top of his block with 12 points, allowing him to advance to the semifinal round. In the semifinal round, Strickland lost in a triple threat match to Jon Moxley, eliminating him from the tournament. On December 30 at Worlds End, Strickland was originally scheduled to face Keith Lee; as Lee was not medically cleared to compete, he was replaced by Dustin Rhodes, who Strickland defeated.

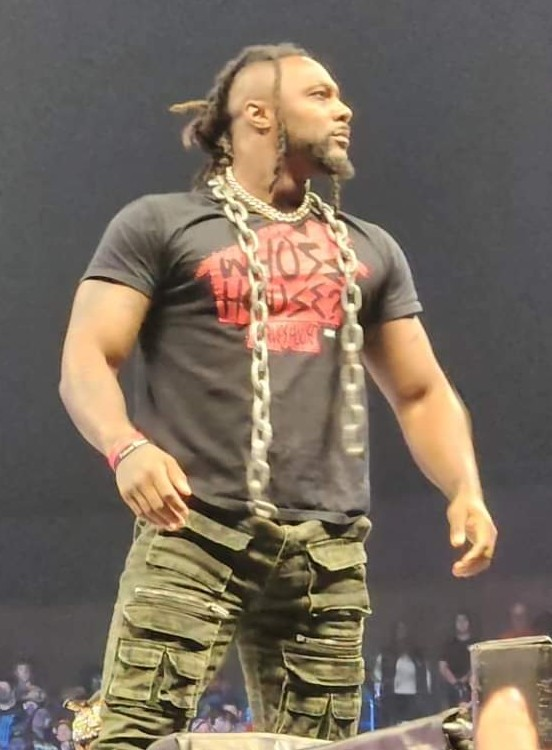
Strickland in April 2024

On the February 7, 2024, episode of Dynamite, Strickland wrestled Adam Page with the winner facing Samoa Joe for the AEW World Championship at Revolution. However, their match went to a 30-minute time limit draw; as a result, both men were declared number one contenders with Joe in turn scheduled to defend the AEW World Championship against both in a three-way match, which was won by Joe.

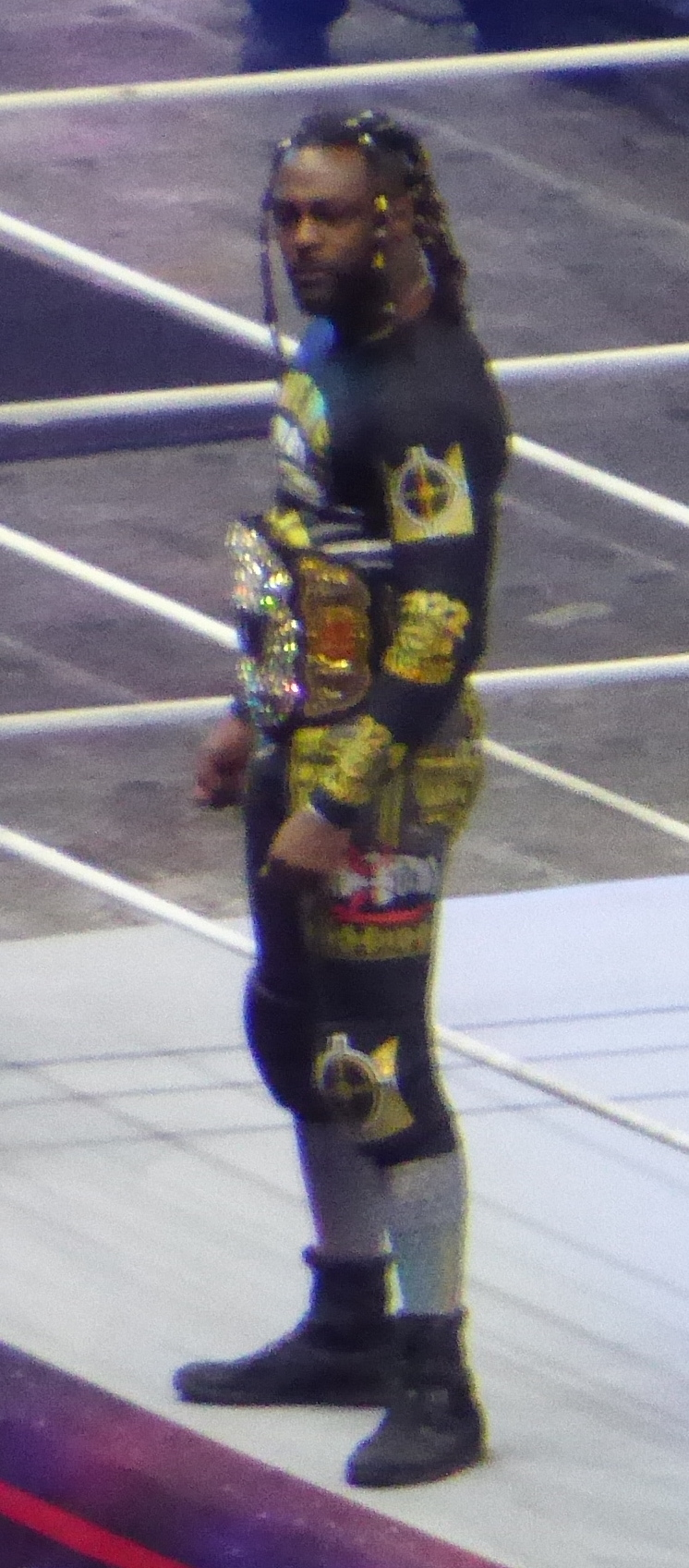
Strickland making his entrance as the AEW World Champion at All In in August 2024

At Dynasty, Strickland defeated Samoa Joe to capture the AEW World Championship. By defeating Samoa Joe, Strickland became the first recognized African-American AEW World Champion. On the April 27 episode of AEW Collision, Strickland defeated Claudio Castagnoli in his first title defense. On the May 1 episode of Dynamite, Strickland's opponent at Double or Nothing on May 26 was revealed to be Christian Cage. On the May 8 episode of Dynamite, Strickland was assaulted by Brian Cage, Bishop Kaun, and Toa Liona, resulting in the disbanding of Mogul Embassy and turning Strickland face. On May 26 at the event, Strickland successfully defended the AEW World Championship against Christian Cage. On June 30 at Forbidden Door, Strickland successfully defended his title against Will Ospreay. On August 25 at All In, he was defeated by Danielson via submission which was his first submission loss in AEW, ending his reign at 126 days. Earlier in the day on the Zero Hour pre-show, it was shown that Strickland had re-signed with AEW in what was later reported by Fightful Select to be a multi-year deal and one of the biggest deals in AEW history.

==== Various feuds (2024–present) ====
During Strickland's match at All In, Adam Page made an appearance, distracted Strickland, which allowed Danielson to gain the upper hand. On the August 28 episode of Dynamite, Strickland confronted Page and challenged him to a steel cage match at All Out on September 7, which was later made official. On the September 4 episode of Dynamite, a contract signing was set for the cage match between Strickland and Page. While Strickland arrived to sign the contract, Page didn't show up as he was at Strickland's childhood house, which Strickland had just recently purchased. Page proceeded to burn down the house as Strickland watched in horror. This forced AEW president Tony Khan to not sanction their steel cage match at All Out, turning the match into a lights out steel cage match On September 7 at All Out, Strickland lost to Page, ending their year-long feud.

After a brief hiatus, Strickland returned on October 12 at WrestleDream, where he started a feud with the debuting stable The Hurt Syndicate (Bobby Lashley, MVP, and Shelton Benjamin). On October 30 at Fright Night Dynamite, Strickland defeated Benjamin, but would be attacked by a debuting Lashley afterwards. On November 23 at Full Gear, Strickland was defeated by Lashley. After losing to Lashley, Strickland began a feud with Ricochet. On the February 5, 2025 episode of Dynamite, Strickland was defeated by Ricochet, who proceeded to steal the "Embassy" robe that Strickland wore in honor of Jimmy Rave. On March 9 at Revolution, Strickland defeated Ricochet, regaining the robe and earning a shot at the AEW World Championship. Later in the show, Strickland attacked reigning champion Jon Moxley after his successful title defense. On April 6 at Dynasty, in a controversial main event, Strickland failed to defeat Moxley after interference from The Young Bucks (Matthew and Nicholas Jackson). On May 25 at Double or Nothing, Strickland teamed with Kenny Omega, Willow Nightingale, and The Opps (Samoa Joe, Powerhouse Hobbs, and Katsuyori Shibata) to defeat the Death Riders (Jon Moxley, Claudio Castagnoli, Marina Shafir, and Wheeler Yuta) and The Young Bucks in an Anarchy in the Arena match.

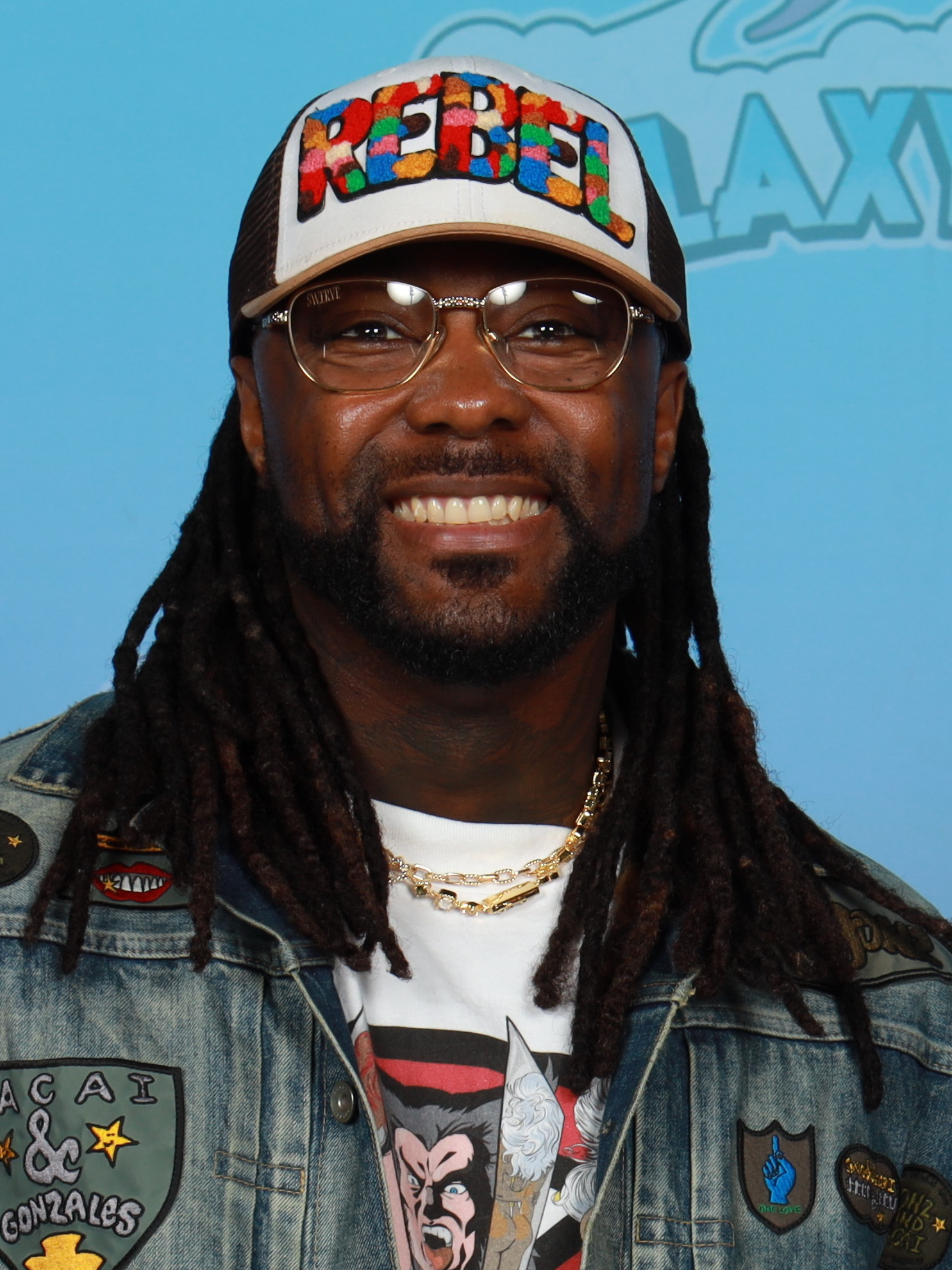
Strickland in 2025

After Double or Nothing, Strickland began a storyline with Will Ospreay after refusing to join Ospreay in assisting Adam Page against the Death Riders, due to Strickland and Page's past rivalry. This led to a match between the two on June 11 at Dynamite: Summer Blockbuster, where the bout ended in a time-limit draw. After the match, Strickland and Ospreay were both attacked by The Young Bucks. At All In on July 12, Strickland and Ospreay defeated The Young Bucks. Per the added stipulation of the match, The Young Bucks were stripped of their executive vice presidents positions of AEW (in kayfabe). In the main event world title match between Jon Moxley and Adam Page, Strickland prevented The Young Bucks from interfering and proceeded to hand a chain to Page that he would use to submit Moxley. On August 24 at Forbidden Door, Strickland unsuccessfully challenged Kazuchika Okada for the AEW Unified Championship. Following Forbidden Door, Strickland took time off to have a torn meniscus that he had been dealing with since 2019 surgically repaired.

On November 22 at Full Gear, Strickland made his return after a three-month hiatus, confronting AEW World Champion Samoa Joe following his title winning victory over Adam Page. That night, he debuted a new theme song that featured Wu-Tang Clan rapper Raekwon. On December 27 at Worlds End, Strickland failed to win the AEW World Championship in a four-way match, which was won by MJF.

In February 2026, Strickland began a feud with Kenny Omega. On the February 18, 2026 episode of Dynamite, Strickland defeated Omega. After the match, Strickland continued to attack Omega, turning heel in the process. At Revolution on March 15, Strickland defeated Brody King. Following his Revolution victory over King, Strickland initially became the new number one contender for the AEW World Championship, only to lose that title in a rematch against Omega on the March 25 episode of Dynamite. After a brief one-month absence, Strickland returned in a vignette on the April 29 episode of Dynamite, where he teased targeting Brody King's tag team partner Bandido. In May to June, competed in his first Owen Hart Cup tournament, defeating Bandido in the quarterfinal at Double or Nothing on May 24 and Brody King in the semifinal on June 10 at Dynamite: Summer Blockbuster, before losing to Will Ospreay in the grand final at Forbidden Door on June 28.

On August 30, 2026 at All In, Strickland teamed up with the debuting New Level (Kofi and Austin Creed) and won a Trios Roulette elimination match to win the AEW World Trios Championship, subsequently becoming the third AEW Triple Crown Champion and reverted back to a face over the following weeks. The trio then began a feud with former champions "Hangman" Adam Page and Brodido (Brody King and Bandido). They successfully defended their titles against Page and Brodido at All Out on September 26 before losing the titles back to them in a two-out-of-three falls match 1–2 at WrestleDream on October 17, ending their reign at 48 days. The trio regained the title on November 14 at Full Gear in a Texas Death match, beginning their record-tying second reign as a team.

== Personal life ==
Strickland has two daughters and a son.

== Other media ==
Strickland is a member of the hip hop group Swerve City and also performs solo as Swerve the Realest.

As Isaiah "Swerve" Scott, he made his video game debut in WWE 2K22. As Swerve Strickland, he was added as a playable character to AEW Fight Forever as downloadable content.

== Championships and accomplishments ==
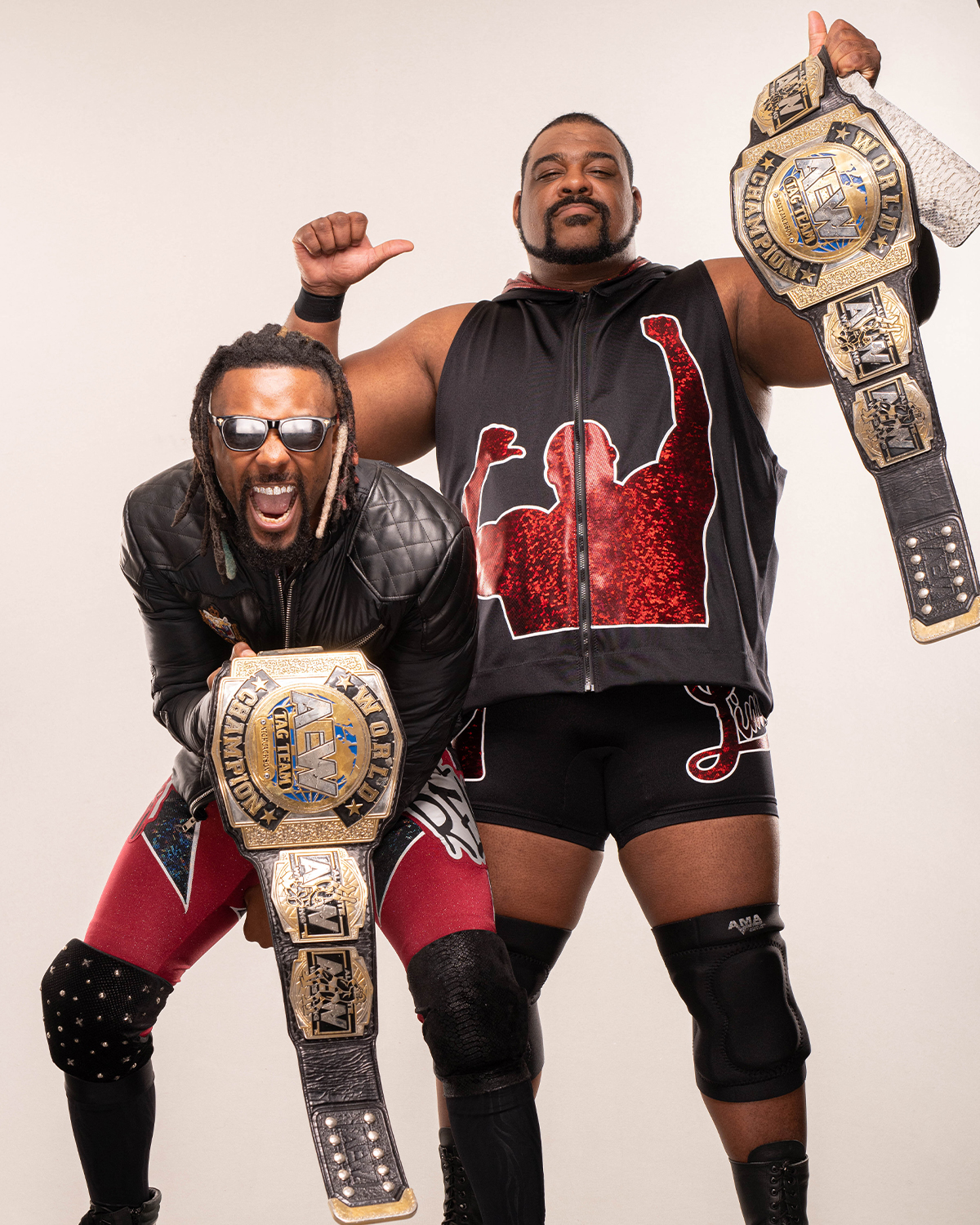
Strickland (left) as one-half of the AEW World Tag Team Champions alongside Keith Lee

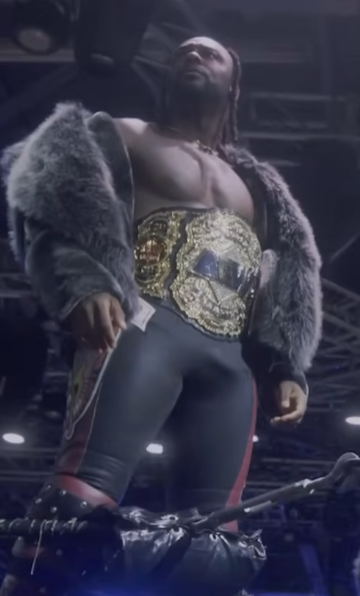
Strickland as AEW World Champion

- All Elite Wrestling
  - AEW World Championship (1 time)
  - AEW World Tag Team Championship (1 time) – with Keith Lee
  - AEW World Trios Championship (2 times, current) – with Austin Creed and Kofi
  - Third AEW Triple Crown Champion
- Combat Zone Wrestling
  - CZW World Heavyweight Championship (1 time)
  - CZW Wired TV Championship (2 times)
- DEFY Wrestling
  - DEFY World Championship (3 times)
  - Defy Tag Team Championship (1 time) – with Christopher Daniels
- ESPN
  - Breakout Wrestler of the Year (2024)
- Evolve
  - Evolve Championship (1 time)
- Ground Xero Wrestling
  - GXW Respect Championship (1 time)
- Lucha Underground
  - Lucha Underground Trios Championship (2 times) – with A. R. Fox and Willie Mack (1) and The Mack and Son of Havoc (1)
- Major League Wrestling
  - MLW World Heavyweight Championship (1 time)
  - MLW World Heavyweight Title Tournament (2018)
- Next Generation Wrestling
  - NGW Championship (1 time)
- PCW Ultra
  - PCW Ultra Heavyweight Championship (1 time)
  - PCW Ultralight Championship (1 time)
- Pro Wrestling Illustrated
  - Ranked No. 2 of the top 500 singles wrestlers in the PWI 500 in 2024
- Sports Illustrated
  - Ranked No. 8 of the top 10 wrestlers of 2023
- Vicious Outcast Wrestling
  - VOW Hyper Sonic Championship (1 time)
- Westside Xtreme Wrestling
  - wXw World Tag Team Championship (1 time) – with David Starr
  - World Tag League (2016) – with David Starr
- WrestleCircus
  - WrestleCircus Ringmaster Championship (1 time)
- WWE
  - NXT North American Championship (1 time)

== Luchas de Apuestas record ==
Winner (wager)	Loser (wager)	Location	Event	Date	Notes
Son of Havoc (mask)	Killshot (mask)	Boyle Heights, California, United States	Ultima Lucha Cuatro	October 31, 2018 (air date)	
