= Bryan Keith (wrestler) =

American professional wrestler

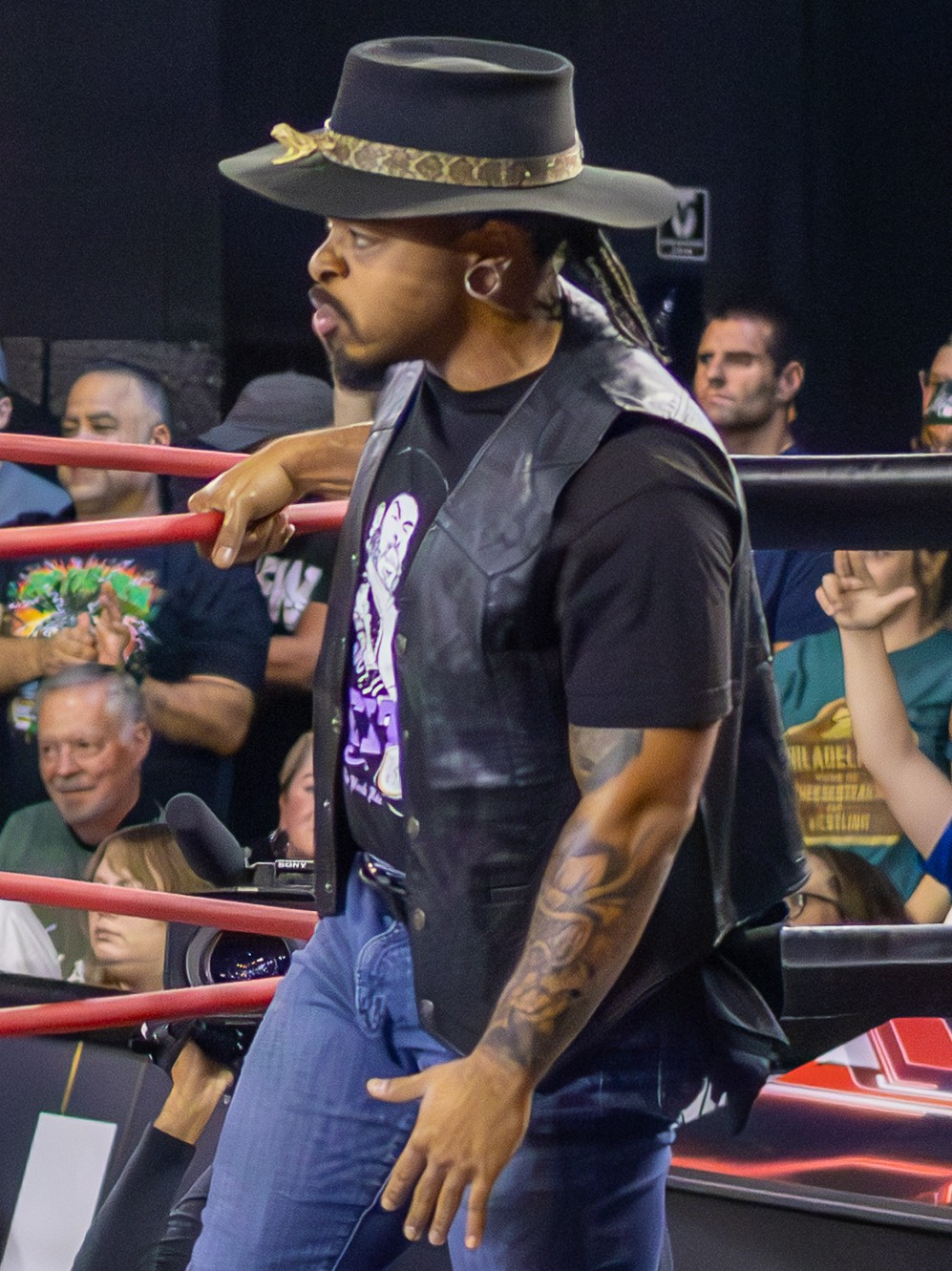
- Bryan Keith in 2025

Personal information
- Born: September 13, 1991 (age 35) Houston, Texas, U.S.

Professional wrestling career
- Ring name(s): Bryan Keith; Brian Keith
- Billed height: 5 ft 9 in (175 cm)
- Billed weight: 189 lb (86 kg)
- Billed from: Greenspoint, Texas
- Trained by: Booker T
- Debut: 2013

Bryan Keith (born September 13, 1991) is an American professional wrestler. As of February 2024, he is signed to All Elite Wrestling (AEW). He also makes appearances in AEW's sister promotion Ring of Honor (ROH). He is also known for his time with Reality of Wrestling (ROW).

== Early life ==
Born on September 13, 1991, in Houston, Texas.

== Professional wrestling career ==
=== Independent circuit (2013–present) ===
Bryan Keith began training in Reality of Wrestling (ROW) and made his ROW television debut in July 2013. He made a one-off appearance in WWE's 205 Live in June 2018. Initially having a cowboy persona, ROW owner Booker T recommended Keith to adopt a bounty hunter gimmick inspired by Sammy Davis Jr.'s character from The Rifleman. Keith served as a trainer in ROW until his departure from the promotion.

In 2019, Keith became the first professional wrestler to be officially sponsored by Swishahouse.

In 2023, Keith began making appearances for Deadlock Pro-Wrestling. At Beast Coast, Keith defeated Andrew Everett to become the DPW National Champion.

On September 20, 2025 at DEFY Wrestling's Aeon, Keith defeated Clark Connors to win the DEFY World Championship.

=== All Elite Wrestling / Ring of Honor (2023–present) ===
At Ring of Honor’s (ROH) Final Battle on December 15, 2023, Keith won the qualifier but lost the Survival of the Fittest match. He made his All Elite Wrestling (AEW) television debut the following day at Collision, losing an AEW International Championship match to Orange Cassidy. On February 3,, Tony Khan confirmed that Keith had signed a contract with AEW. On May 26, 2024, at Double or Nothing, Keith turned heel by helping Chris Jericho retain his FTW Championship against Hook and Katsuyori Shibata, joining Jericho's newly formed Learning Tree stable. On the June 12 episode of Dynamite, fellow member Big Bill and Keith were dubbed "The Redwood" and "The Bad Apple" respectively.

On April 6, 2025 at Dynasty, Keith and Bill unsuccessfully challenged The Hurt Syndicate for the AEW World Tag Team Championship. He later attempted to interfere in the ROH World Championship match between Jericho and Bandido, but would be stopped by Bandido's brother Gravity. On the following episode of Dynamite, tension in The Learning Tree would disband as Jericho would blame losing the ROH World Championship on both Big Bill and Bryan Keith, before saying it's best that he leaves for a while until Bill and Keith make a change. After being abandoned by Jericho, Keith and Bill would continue to operate as a tag team, later adopting the name "Paid in Full". Keith would also quietly dropped "The Bad Apple" moniker and returned to being "The Bounty Hunter". Paid in Full would disband upon Bill's departure from AEW in July 2026, leaving Keith as a singles wrestler.

== Championships and accomplishments ==
- Deadlock Pro-Wrestling
  - DPW National Championship (1 time)
- DEFY Wrestling
  - DEFY World Championship (1 time, current)
- PCW Ultra
  - PCW ULTRA Light Heavyweight championship (1 time)
- Pro Wrestling Illustrated
  - Ranked No. 102 of the top 500 singles wrestlers in the PWI 500 in 2023
- Reality of Wrestling
- ROW Heavyweight Championship (1 time)
  - ROW Television Championship (1 time)
- VIP Wrestling
  - VIP Heavyweight Championship (1 time)
- Wrestling Observer Newsletter
  - Worst Gimmick (2024) as part of The Learning Tree
