= Granden Goetzman =

American baseball player and wrestler (born 1992)

- Outfielder
- Born: November 14, 1992 (age 33); Philadelphia, Pennsylvania, U.S.
- Bats: Right Throws: Right
Professional wrestling career
Ring name	Trench
Billed height	6 ft 4 in (193 cm)
Billed weight	200 lb (91 kg)
Trained by	Jay Lethal
Debut	December 21, 2022

Granden Galen Goetzman (born November 14, 1992) is an American professional wrestler and former baseball player. Prior to beginning a career in professional wrestling, Goetzman played nine seasons in Minor League Baseball from 2011–2019 and one season in the Mexican League in 2021. He made his televised debut in professional wrestling in December 2022 after signing with All Elite Wrestling under the ring name Trench.

== Early life ==
Goetzman was born on November 14, 1992, in Philadelphia, Pennsylvania. He attended Palmetto Ridge High School in Palmetto, Florida.

== Professional baseball career ==
Goetzman was selected 75th in the second round of the 2011 Minor League Baseball draft by the Tampa Bay Rays. At 6 ft 4 in (1.93 m) and 200 pounds (91 kg), Goetzman played outfield, left field, right field and center field positions. He played for nine teams over the course of nine seasons in the Minor League, playing his final MLB season in 2019.

Goetzman played one season of professional baseball in the Mexican League as a left fielder with the Tigres de Quintana Roo from May to June 2021.

== Professional wrestling career ==
After signing with All Elite Wrestling, Goetzman trained under the guidance of Jay Lethal for most of 2022. He made his first televised appearance on the December 22 episode of AEW Dynamite alongside Parker Boudreaux and Rick Ross as members of Mogul Affiliates, a faction under the leadership of Swerve Strickland. Later identified as Trench, a report released on June 11, 2023, announced Trench and Boudreaux sustained unspecified injuries and would sit out for an undetermined time to recover. It was reported on July 3, 2023, that Trench's AEW contract expired and the company opted not to renew.
