= Full Gear (2023) =

All Elite Wrestling pay-per-view event

- Promotional poster featuring MJF and Jay White
- Promotion: All Elite Wrestling
- Date: November 18, 2023
- City: Inglewood, California
- Venue: Kia Forum
- Attendance: 12,904
- Buy rate: 131,000

Pay-per-view chronology
← Previous; WrestleDream	Next → Worlds End

Full Gear chronology
← Previous; 2022	Next → 2024

The 2023 Full Gear was a professional wrestling pay-per-view (PPV) event produced by All Elite Wrestling (AEW). It was the fifth annual Full Gear and took place on November 18, 2023, at the Kia Forum in the Los Angeles suburb of Inglewood, California.

Eleven matches were contested at the event, including three on the "Zero Hour" pre-show. In the main event, MJF defeated Jay White to retain the AEW World Championship. In other prominent matches, "Timeless" Toni Storm defeated Hikaru Shida to win her record-tying third AEW Women's World Championship and Swerve Strickland defeated "Hangman" Adam Page in a Texas Death match.

The event was also notable for the signing of international wrestler Will Ospreay to AEW full-time. Ospreay had been competing on AEW programming while he was under contract with New Japan Pro-Wrestling (NJPW). He officially joined the AEW roster in February 2024 after his NJPW contract expired.

== Production ==
=== Background ===
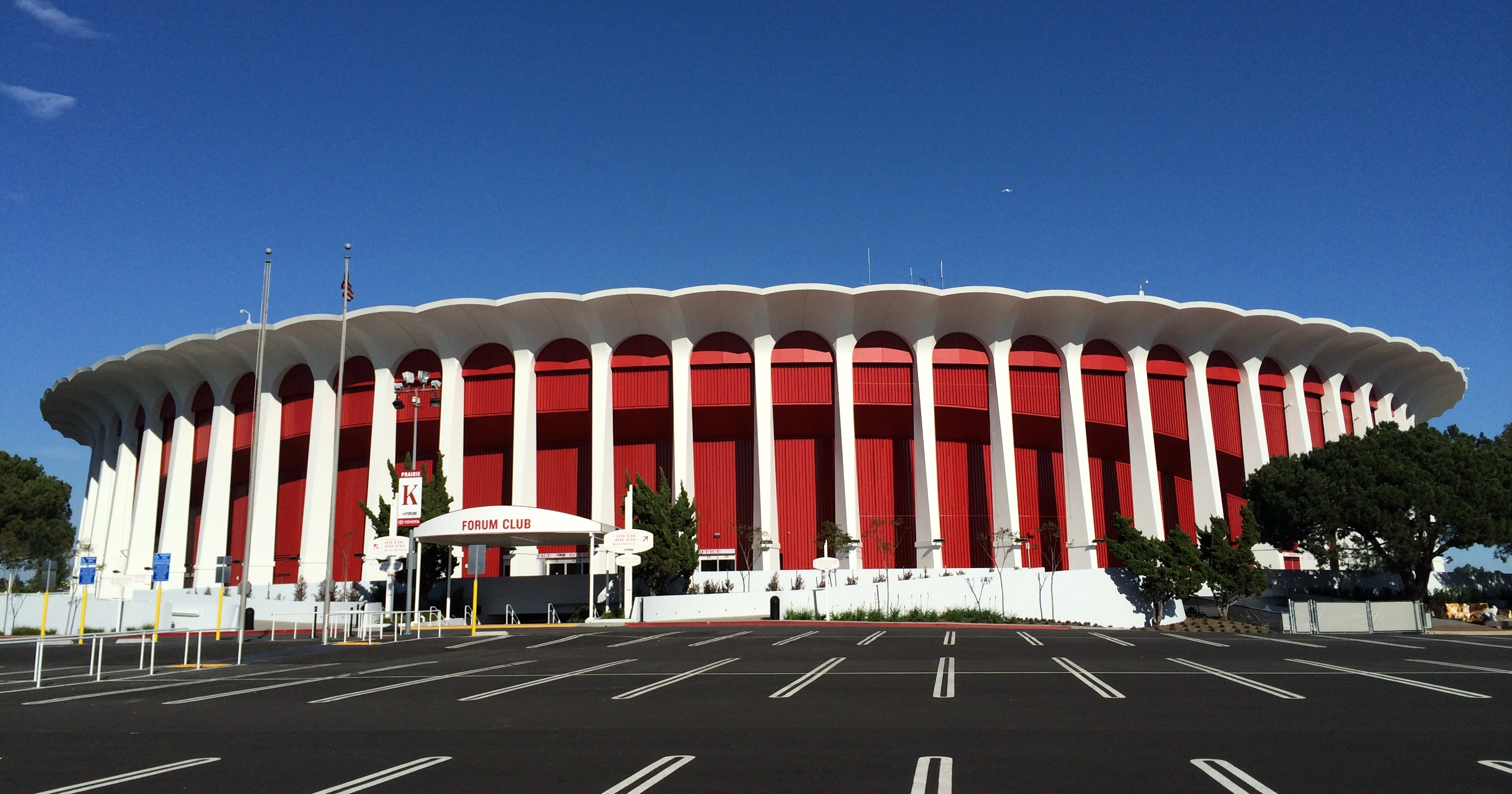
The 2023 Full Gear took place at the Kia Forum in Inglewood, California.

Full Gear is a professional wrestling pay-per-view (PPV) event held annually in November by All Elite Wrestling (AEW) since 2019, generally around the week of Veterans Day. It is one of AEW's "Big Four" PPVs, which includes Double or Nothing, All Out, and Revolution, their four biggest domestic events produced quarterly. Out of the four, Full Gear is AEW's only pay-per-view to be traditionally held on a Saturday. During the All In post-event media scrum on August 27, 2023, it was announced that the fifth Full Gear event would take place on November 18, 2023, at the Kia Forum in Inglewood, California. Tickets went on sale on September 8, 2023. AEW also partnered with Joe Hand Promotions to air Full Gear in select theaters across the United States and in select out-of-home establishments (e.g., restaurants) across North America.

Due to the event taking place in Collision's normal Saturday night time slot, that weekend's episode was instead held live at the same venue the night before on Friday, November 17 at 8 p.m. Eastern Time (ET)—Collision is AEW's third weekly program that launched in June. This did not affect AEW's regular Friday program, Rampage, which also aired live that same night from the same venue at its normal 10 p.m. ET slot.

=== Storylines ===
Full Gear featured professional wrestling matches that were the result of pre-existing feuds and storylines, with results being predetermined by AEW's writers. Storylines were produced on AEW's weekly television programs, Dynamite, Collision, and Rampage.

On the September 27 episode of Dynamite, Jay White interrupted AEW World Champion MJF. White claimed that he was ultimately responsible for MJF and Adam Cole's friendship and subsequent teaming as Better Than You Bay Bay, as Cole had gotten injured in their match at the 2022 Forbidden Door, with Cole becoming involved with MJF after returning the following year. White then claimed that he would take the AEW World Championship from MJF. The following week, White, along with Bullet Club Gold stablemates Juice Robinson and The Gunns (Austin Gunn and Colten Gunn), attacked MJF. White subsequently stole the AEW World Championship belt and challenged MJF for the title at Full Gear and MJF accepted. Additionally, on the October 24 episode, The Gunns stated they wanted a match against MJF for the ROH World Tag Team Championship at Full Gear, which MJF accepted. On October 30, it was announced that MJF and a mystery partner would defend the tag title against The Gunns during the Full Gear Zero Hour pre-show—MJF's championship partner Cole suffered a broken foot in late September. Samoa Joe offered to be his partner in exchange for a future AEW World Championship match, but MJF declined until the November 17 episode of Rampage when he accepted after Joe saved him from a beat down.

At WrestleDream, Christian Cage defeated Darby Allin to retain the AEW TNT Championship, which also saw Nick Wayne turn on Allin and join with Cage. Following the match, Cage and Wayne attacked Allin further until Sting came out to make the save, but Luchasaurus also got involved to attack Sting and Allin. As Cage was about to perform a con-chair-to on Sting, Adam Copeland (formerly known as Edge in WWE) made his AEW debut and saved Sting and Allin. On the following Dynamite, Copeland tried to bring Cage to his senses and reunite as a team, but Cage refused. On the October 24 episode, Cage, Luchasaurus, and Wayne interrupted Sting and challenged him, Allin, and a partner of their choosing to a trios match at Full Gear, which Sting accepted. Later during a backstage interview, Copeland said he refused to fight Cage, but then Sting and Allin appeared and told him that Cage could not be trusted. The following week, after Cage, Luchasaurus, and Wayne attacked Copeland, he was saved by Sting and Allin. Copeland then stated he would be their partner at Full Gear. Cage's faction would later be known as The Patriarchy.

At All Out, Jon Moxley defeated Orange Cassidy to win the AEW International Championship. However, at Dynamite: Grand Slam, Moxley dropped the title to Rey Fenix due to a legitimate concussion incurred during the match. Cassidy then regained the title from Fenix at Dynamite: Title Tuesday. After Cassidy retained the title against Moxley's Blackpool Combat Club stablemate Claudio Castagnoli on the November 1 episode, Moxley came to the ring and was attacked by Cassidy. Later, Moxley challenged Cassidy for the International Championship at Full Gear, which was later confirmed.

== Event ==
Other on-screen personnel
Role	Name
Commentators	Excalibur (Pre-show and PPV)
Commentators	Nigel McGuinness (Pre-show and PPV)
Commentators	Tony Schiavone (Pre-show and PPV)
Commentators	Taz (PPV)
Commentators	Don Callis (The Golden Jets vs. The Young Bucks)
Ring announcers	Justin Roberts
Ring announcers	Dasha Gonzalez
Ring announcers	Bobby Cruise
Referees	Aubrey Edwards
Referees	Bryce Remsburg
Referees	Paul Turner
Referees	Rick Knox
Referees	Stephon Smith
Referees	Brandon Martinez
Pre-show hosts	Renee Paquette
Pre-show hosts	RJ City
Pre-show hosts	Stokely Hathaway

=== Pre-show ===
There were three matches that took place on the Zero Hour pre-show. In the first match, Eddie Kingston defended the ROH World Championship against Jay Lethal (accompanied by Jeff Jarrett, Sonjay Dutt, Karen Jarrett, and Satnam Singh). During the match, Kingston performed an exploder suplex on Lethal for a nearfall. Kingston then delivered a hurricarana to Lethal for a nearfall. In the end, as Lethal attempted the Lethal Injection, Kingston caught him and countered with a half-and-half suplex and the Backfist to the Future to retain his title. Following the match, Kingston and Ortiz thanked the crowd.

Next, Claudio Castagnoli faced Buddy Matthews. In the closing stages, Matthews delivered an uppercut and diving knee strikes to Castagnoli. Matthews then performed a Tenryu powerbomb and the Jackhammer for a nearfall. In the end, Castagnoli then delivered a pop-up uppercut, a Ricola bomb, and applied in the Sharpshooter on Matthews, who submitted, giving Castagnoli the victory.

In the final pre-show match, MJF and Samoa Joe defended the ROH World Tag Team Championship against The Gunns (Austin Gunn and Colten Gunn). During the match, as The Gunns attempted the 3:10 to Joe, MJF intercepted them with a double DDT. The Gunns then delivered 3:10 to Joe only for MJF to break up the pin attempt. Adam Cole then made his return and distracted Austin, allowing Joe to apply in the Coquina Clutch on Colten who submitted, thus MJF and Joe retained the title. Following the match, as MJF embraced Cole, The Gunns attacked MJF with a chair and attacked his leg several times with chairs. Medical personnel tended to MJF who was taken on a stretcher and in an ambulance, thus MJF was deemed unable to defend the AEW World Championship against Jay White in the main event. Cole then stated that he would defend the title on behalf of MJF.

=== Preliminary matches ===
The main card opened with Sting, Adam Copeland, and Darby Allin (accompanied by Ric Flair) facing The Patriarchy (Christian Cage, Luchasaurus, and Nick Wayne). During the match, Copeland delivered a Russian leg sweep and a swinging neckbreaker to Luchasaurus for a nearfall. Wayne performed an uppercut on Allin from the top rope, however, Allin delivered an avalanche Code Red to Wayne for a nearfall. Copeland then performed an impaler DDT to Luchasaurus. Allin then delivered a suicide dive to Luchasaurus and Wayne. Luchasaurus then performed a lariat on Copeland for a nearfall. As Flair was distracting Cage, Cage attacked Flair with a low blow. Cage then accidentally struck Luchasaurus with the AEW TNT Championship belt and then left the arena. Sting then delivered a Stinger Splash on Luchasaurus, followed by Copeland performing a Spear. In the end, Allin performed the Coffin Drop to Luchasaurus to win the match.

Next, Orange Cassidy (accompanied by Hook) defended the AEW International Championship against Jon Moxley (accompanied by Wheeler Yuta). During the match, Moxley delivered a Bossman slam and applied in the Texas Cloverleaf on Cassidy, who managed to escape. Cassidy then performed a superplex and a satellite DDT to Moxley for a nearfall. As Moxley attempted the Death Rider, Cassidy countered it into an attempted Stundog Millionaire; however, Moxley countered into a bulldog choke on Cassidy who escaped. As Cassidy then attempted the Orange Punch, Moxley countered Cassidy with an Ace Crusher in mid-air. Moxley then performed a Gotch-style Piledriver on Cassidy for a nearfall. Cassidy then delivered three consecutive Orange Punches to Moxley and used a victory roll pin resulting in a nearfall. In the climax, Cassidy then performed two more Orange Punches and a Beach Break before pinning Moxley to retain the title.

After that, Hikaru Shida defended the AEW Women's World Championship against "Timeless" Toni Storm (accompanied by Luther the Butler). During the match, Shida delivered a jumping knee strike and Storm Zero on Storm for a nearfall. Shida then performed a Falcon Arrow on Storm for a nearfall. As Shida then attempted a Michinoku Driver, Storm avoided and applied in an ankle lock on Shida, however, Shida escaped. As Shida attacked Luther with a kendo stick, Storm performed a deadlift German suplex and a running hip attack (later revealed to be a frying pan hidden in Storm's tights that was unbeknownst to the referee) on Shida to win the AEW Women's World Championship for a record-tying third time.

In the fourth match, Ricky Starks and Big Bill defended the AEW World Tag Team Championship against FTR (Cash Wheeler and Dax Harwood), La Facción Ingobernable (Rush and Dralístico, accompanied by José the Assistant and Preston Vance), and Kings of The Black Throne (Malakai Black and Brody King) in a four-way tag team ladder match. During the match, Black delivered a moonsault from the top of the ladder onto the other competitors. Rush then performed a punt kick to Wheeler. Wheeler then attacked Black with a low blow and performed a piledriver on Black onto a ladder. Dralístico then performed a dropkick on Wheeler, whose head was wedged in a ladder. Starks then delivered a spear to Rush and a tornado DDT to Wheeler. King then performed a back body drop to Harwood through a ladder. Dralístico delivered a springboard Codebreaker to Bill, who immediately performed a chokeslam to Dralístico. Rush performed Bull's Horns to Bill with a ladder. As Dralístico delivered a poisonrana to Black, King performed a Ganso Bomb to Dralístico through a ladder. Wheeler then delivered a diving splash on King through a ladder and Black performed Black Mass to Harwood. In the end, as Starks and Wheeler as ascended the ladder, Bill caught Wheeler and intercepted him, allowing Starks to unhook the titles to retain.

In the next match, Kris Statlander defended the AEW TBS Championship against Julia Hart and Skye Blue. During the match, Statlander delivered a back suplex to Blue for a nearfall. Statlander and Blue performed a roundhouse kick/neckbreaker combination to Hart. Blue performed a superkick and a powerbomb to Hart for a nearfall. As Statlander attempted a powerbomb, Blue countered into Code Blue on Statlander for a nearfall. In the end, as Statlander attempted a pin on Blue, Hart clotheslined Statlander and pinned Blue to win the TBS Championship.

After that was a Texas Death match contested between Swerve Strickland (accompanied by Prince Nana) and "Hangman" Adam Page, who ran out and attacked Strickland to start the match, delivering a Buckshot Lariat within the first minute. Page tied up Strickland's arms, repeatedly used a staple gun on him, used chair attacks to draw blood from Strickland's head, and drank the blood. Strickland retaliated with a low blow, and was cut free by Nana. Strickland shrugged off further staples, then stapled himself and grinned. Page also bled after barbed wire was used against his head. Swerve gave Page a Death Valley Driver onto a cinderblock and a piledriver onto the guard rail. Page performed on Strickland a moonsault with a barbed wire chair, then Nana disrupted another Buckshot Lariat. Page performed on Strickland a tombstone piledriver onto a chair; Strickland beat the count. Strickland sprinkled broken glass on Page's back, performed a 450° splash, then landed a JML Driver, but Page beat the count. Page put barbed wire around Strickland's neck and landed another Buckshot Lariat, but Nana pulled Strickland to stand on the floor to beat the count. Both Brian Cage and Nana attacked Page, who fended off both by delivering a barbed wire-assisted lariat on Cage, and then driving Nana through a table onto the floor with a Deadeye. Strickland shattered a cinderblock on Page's back, then hung Page by the neck using a metal chain wrapped around the top turnbuckle. The choke was released, but Page failed to answer the 10 count, granting Strickland victory via knockout.

In the penultimate match, The Golden Jets (Chris Jericho and Kenny Omega) faced The Young Bucks (Matt Jackson and Nick Jackson) with the stipulation that if The Golden Jets won, they would receive The Young Bucks' AEW World Tag Team Championship opportunity, but if The Young Bucks won, The Golden Jets would have to disband as a team. During the match, Matt performed double northern lights suplexes to Jericho and Omega. Nick then performed a senton atomico to Jericho, however, Omega broke up the pin attempt. The Young Bucks then delivered the BTE Trigger to Jericho for a nearfall. Jericho then attacked Nick with a low blow as the referee was distracted by Omega. Nick delivered a poisonrana to Jericho, while Matt performed the One-Winged Angel on Omega for another nearfall. As The Young Bucks attempted the Meltzer Driver, Jericho responded by performing a Codebreaker on Nick. In the end, Jericho delivered the Judas Effect to Nick, while Omega performed a ripcord V-Trigger and the One-Winged Angel on Matt to win the match, thus Omega and Jericho earned The Young Bucks' future AEW World Tag Team Championship opportunity.

=== Main event ===
In the main event, Adam Cole came out to defend the AEW World Championship against Jay White (accompanied by Austin Gunn and Colten Gunn) on behalf of MJF due to MJF suffering an injury on the pre-show; however, MJF was shown driving the ambulance to the arena, thus MJF defended his title. During the match, as The Gunns attempted to attack MJF again with a chair, the referee noticed and ejected them from ringside. MJF bit White in the face and delivered a Kangaroo Kick. White then performed an uranage on MJF for a nearfall. As MJF placed White on the announce table, the table collapsed, but MJF still performed a diving elbow drop on White onto the remnants of the table. White then performed a dragon screw to MJF in between the ropes and an uranage for a nearfall. White then delivered a Complete Shot and a deadlift German suplex to MJF for a nearfall. As White attempted the Bladerunner, MJF countered it with a schoolboy pin for a nearfall. MJF delivered a tombstone piledriver and a running cutter to the outside to White for another nearfall. White then applied the figure four leglock on MJF, however, MJF reversed it and White escaped. Unbeknownst to the referee, White collected the ROH World Tag Team Championship belt and struck MJF with it for a nearfall. As White then kicked MJF's leg repeatedly, the referee tried to stop White, after which, White stumbled and accidentally incapacitated the referee. As Cole then inadvertently slid the AEW Dynamite Diamond Ring to White, MJF delivered a low blow on White. Austin and Colten then returned, they were tossed out of the ring by MJF. In the end, MJF then attacked White with the Dynamite Diamond Ring to retain the title and go a full year as AEW World Champion.

== Reception ==
The event received positive reviews. Steve Cook of 411Mania wrote "main matches were good & entertaining, and my complaints aren't anything new to regular AEW viewers".

During the Swerve-Page match, there was a spot where Page laid under Swerve, who was bleeding heavily, and drank his blood before spitting it out. PWInsider's Mike Johnson called the spot "disgusting and never should have happened", while Dave Scherer said it was "horrific and disgusting". Other websites pointed that the spot was "hard to watch" and "sickened" the viewers. AEW commentator Jim Ross praised the match, pointing it reminded him of "the old ECW". The match was given a five star rating from the Wrestling Observer Newsletter. Strickland pointed that, after the match, he is "immortalized" Answering Jim Cornette, who criticized the match, he answered "It's like telling kids there's a new insane horror movie out, don't go see it!".

== Results ==
No.	Results	Stipulations	Times
1^{P}	Eddie Kingston (c) defeated Jay Lethal (with Jeff Jarrett, Karen Jarrett, Satnam Singh, and Sonjay Dutt) by pinfall	Singles match for the ROH World Championship	10:55
2^{P}	Claudio Castagnoli defeated Buddy Matthews by submission	Singles match	10:30
3^{P}	MJF (c) and Samoa Joe (Note: Samoa Joe substituted for co-champion Adam Cole, who was injured with a broken ankle.) defeated The Gunns (Austin Gunn and Colten Gunn) by submission	Tag team match for the ROH World Tag Team Championship	9:25
4	Sting, Darby Allin, and Adam Copeland (with Ric Flair) defeated The Patriarchy (Christian Cage, Luchasaurus, and Nick Wayne) by pinfall	Trios match	15:10
5	Orange Cassidy (c) (with Hook) defeated Jon Moxley (with Wheeler Yuta) by pinfall	Singles match for the AEW International Championship	12:05
6	"Timeless" Toni Storm (with Luther) defeated Hikaru Shida (c) by pinfall	Singles match for the AEW Women's World Championship	10:25
7	Ricky Starks and Big Bill (c) defeated La Facción Ingobernable (Rush and Dralístico) (with José the Assistant and Preston Vance), FTR (Cash Wheeler and Dax Harwood), and Kings of the Black Throne (Malakai Black and Brody King)	Four-way tag team ladder match for the AEW World Tag Team Championship	20:35
8	Julia Hart defeated Kris Statlander (c) and Skye Blue by pinfall	Three-way match for the AEW TBS Championship	11:20
9	Swerve Strickland (with Prince Nana) defeated "Hangman" Adam Page by knockout	Texas Death match	29:55
10	The Golden Jets (Chris Jericho and Kenny Omega) defeated The Young Bucks (Matt Jackson and Nick Jackson) by pinfall	Tag team match Since The Golden Jets won, they got The Young Bucks' AEW World Tag Team Championship opportunity. Had The Young Bucks won, The Golden Jets would have had to disband as a team.	20:45
11	MJF (c) (with Adam Cole) defeated Jay White (with The Gunns) by pinfall	Singles match for the AEW World Championship	29:45
(c) / – the champion(s) heading into the match; P / – the match was broadcast on the pre-show
