= The Learning Tree (professional wrestling) =

Professional wrestling stable in AEW

Stable
- Leader: Chris Jericho
- Members: Big Bill; Bryan Keith
- Name: The Learning Tree
- Billed heights: Jericho: 5 ft 11 in (1.80 m); Bill: 6 ft 10 in (2.08 m); Bryan: 5 ft 9 in (1.75 m)
- Combined billed weight: 692 lb (314 kg)
- Debut: May 1, 2024
- Disbanded: April 9, 2025
- Years active: 2024–2025

The Learning Tree was a professional wrestling stable in All Elite Wrestling (AEW) and Ring of Honor (ROH) consisting of leader Chris Jericho, Big Bill, and Bryan Keith.

== History ==
Starting in March 2024, Jericho attempted to form a mentor-student relationship with FTW Champion Hook. However, Jericho was rebuffed, ultimately leading to a match between the two at Dynasty which saw Jericho winning the FTW Championship from Hook. On the April 24 episode of Dynamite, Jericho rechristened the FTW Championship as the "For The World Championship" and dubbed himself "The Learning Tree", where he would arrogantly offer advice and guidance to wrestlers, referring to potential new recruits as being part of the "Jericho Vortex", and sarcastically saying he needs his "TV time".

On the May 1 episode of Dynamite, Jericho successfully defended the FTW Championship against Katsuyori Shibata with the assistance of Big Bill, whom Jericho then agreed to add to The Learning Tree. On May 26 at Double or Nothing, Jericho successfully defended the title against Hook and Shibata with the help of Bryan Keith as the new member of the stable. On the June 12 episode of Dynamite, Big Bill and Keith were dubbed "The Redwood" and "The Bad Apple" respectively. On the October 23 episode of Dynamite, Jericho defeated ROH World Champion Mark Briscoe for the title in a Ladder War match to become a two-time champion (his first for the stable). On April 6 at Dynasty, Jericho would lose the ROH World Championship to Bandido in a Title vs. Mask match, while Big Bill and Bryan Keith would also fail to win the AEW World Tag Team Championships from The Hurt Syndicate. On the following episode of Dynamite, The Learning Tree would disband as Jericho would blame losing the ROH World Championship on both Big Bill and Bryan Keith, before saying it's best that he leaves for a while until Bill and Keith make a change.

== Championships and accomplishments ==
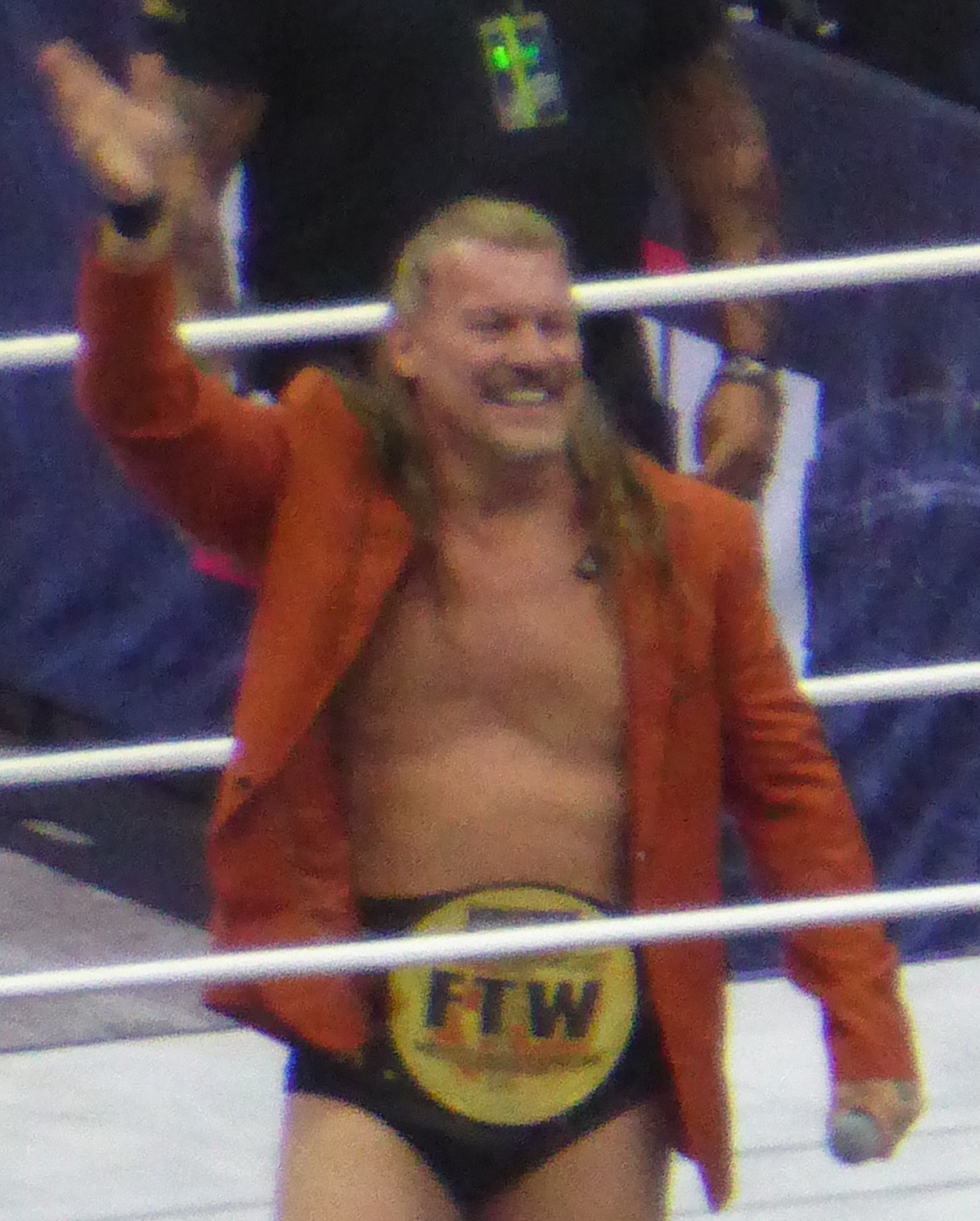
Jericho is a one-time FTW Champion

- All Elite Wrestling
  - FTW Championship (1 time) – Jericho
- Ring of Honor
  - ROH World Championship (1 time) – Jericho
- Wrestling Observer Newsletter
  - Worst Gimmick (2024)
