= DEFY World Championship =

Men's professional wrestling

- Current title design (2017–present)

Details
- Promotion: DEFY Wrestling
- Date established: June 30, 2017
- Current champion: Bryan Keith
- Date won: September 19, 2025
Statistics
- First champion: Davey Richards
- Most reigns: Swerve Strickland (3 reigns)
- Longest reign: Randy Myers (1,009 days)
- Shortest reign: Davey Richards (8 days)
- Oldest champion: Kenta (42 years, 83 days)
- Youngest champion: Nick Wayne (17 years, 272 days)
- Heaviest champion: Schaff (273 lb (124 kg))
- Lightest champion: Artemis Spencer (176 lb (80 kg))

The DEFY World Championship is a men's professional wrestling world championship created and promoted by the American promotion DEFY Wrestling, being sanctioned as the promotion's top championship. There have been a total of twelve reigns shared between nine different champions. The current champion is Bryan Keith who is in his first reign. He won the title by defeating Clark Connors at Aeon on September 19, 2025, in Seattle, Washington.

== Title history ==
There have been a total of 11 reigns shared between 9 different champions. Davey Richards was the inaugural champion who also holds the record for the shortest reign with eight days. Randy Myers had the longest reign at 1,009 days, however without scoring any defenses due to the COVID pandemic impact. Swerve Strickland holds the record for most reigns with three. The current champion is Bryan Keith who is in his first reign. He won the title by defeating Clark Connors at Aeon on September 19, 2025, in Seattle, Washington.

Key
No.	Overall reign number
Reign	Reign number for the specific champion
Days	Number of days held
Defenses	Number of successful defenses
<1	Reign lasted less than a day
+	Current reign is changing daily

No.	Champion	Championship change			Reign statistics			Notes	Ref.
No.	Champion	Date	Event	Location	Reign	Days	Defenses	Notes	Ref.
1	Davey Richards	June 30, 2017	DEFY5 Gigantic	Seattle, WA	1	8	0	Defeated Shane Strickland in the tournament final to become the inaugural champion.	
2	Shane Strickland	July 8, 2017	CZW Evilution	Voorhees, NJ	1	279	5	This was a four-way Winner Takes All match also disputed for Strickland's CZW World Heavyweight Championship which also involved Joe Gacy and Lio Rush.	
3	Austin Aries	April 13, 2018	Vibes	Seattle, WA	1	98	1	This was a Winner Takes All match also for Aries' Impact World Championship.	
4	Shane Strickland	July 20, 2018	Swerve Vs. Aries	Portland, OR	2	147	3		
5	Artemis Spencer	December 14, 2018	On Edge	Seattle, WA	1	252	8		
6	Schaff	August 23, 2019	Defyance Forever	Tacoma, WA	1	182	4		
7	Randy Myers	February 21, 2020	Kings Of Crash	Seattle, WA	1	1,009	0		
—	Christopher Daniels (Interim)	December 18, 2021	Dark Horse	Seattle, WA	—	294	6	Daniels defeated Brody King to become the interim champion.	
—	Swerve Strickland (Interim)	October 8, 2022	City Of Thorns	Portland, OR	—	49	0		
8	Swerve Strickland	November 26, 2022	Fightwave	Seattle, WA	3	133	1	This was a Championship Unification match in which Strickland wrestled as the interim champion. The bout was a six-way ladder match which also involved Artemis Spencer, Christopher Daniels, Cody Chhun and Schaff. Strickland was previously known as Shane Stricklad.	
9	Nick Wayne	April 8, 2023	The Realest	Seattle, WA	1	56	2		
10	Kenta	June 3, 2023	Your Nightmare	Seattle, WA	1	626	10		
11	Ricky Starks	February 7, 2025	Hundredth	Seattle, WA	1	21	0		
—	Vacated	February 28, 2025	—	—	—	—	—	Starks vacated the title after signing with WWE.	
12	Clark Connors	March 15, 2025	Aftermath	Seattle, WA	1	188	1	Defeated Starboy Charlie in a Super 8XGP Tournament final to win the vacant title.	
13	Bryan Keith	September 19, 2025	Aeon	Seattle, WA	1	379+	4		

== Combined reigns ==
As of October 3, 2026.

†	Indicates the current champion

Rank	Wrestler	No. of reigns	Combined defenses	Combined days
1	Randy Myers	1	0	1,009
2	Kenta	1	10	626
3	Swerve Strickland (Note: Strickland was known as "Shane Strickland" during his first two title reigns.)	3	9	559
4	Bryan Keith †	1	4	379+
5	Artemis Spencer	1	8	252
6	Clark Connors	1	1	188
7	Schaff	1	4	182
8	Austin Aries	1	1	98
9	Nick Wayne	1	2	56
10	Ricky Starks	1	0	21
11	Davey Richards	1	0	8
