= West Fourth Street Courts =

Athletic venue in Manhattan, New York

Coordinates: 40°43′53″N 74°00′03″W

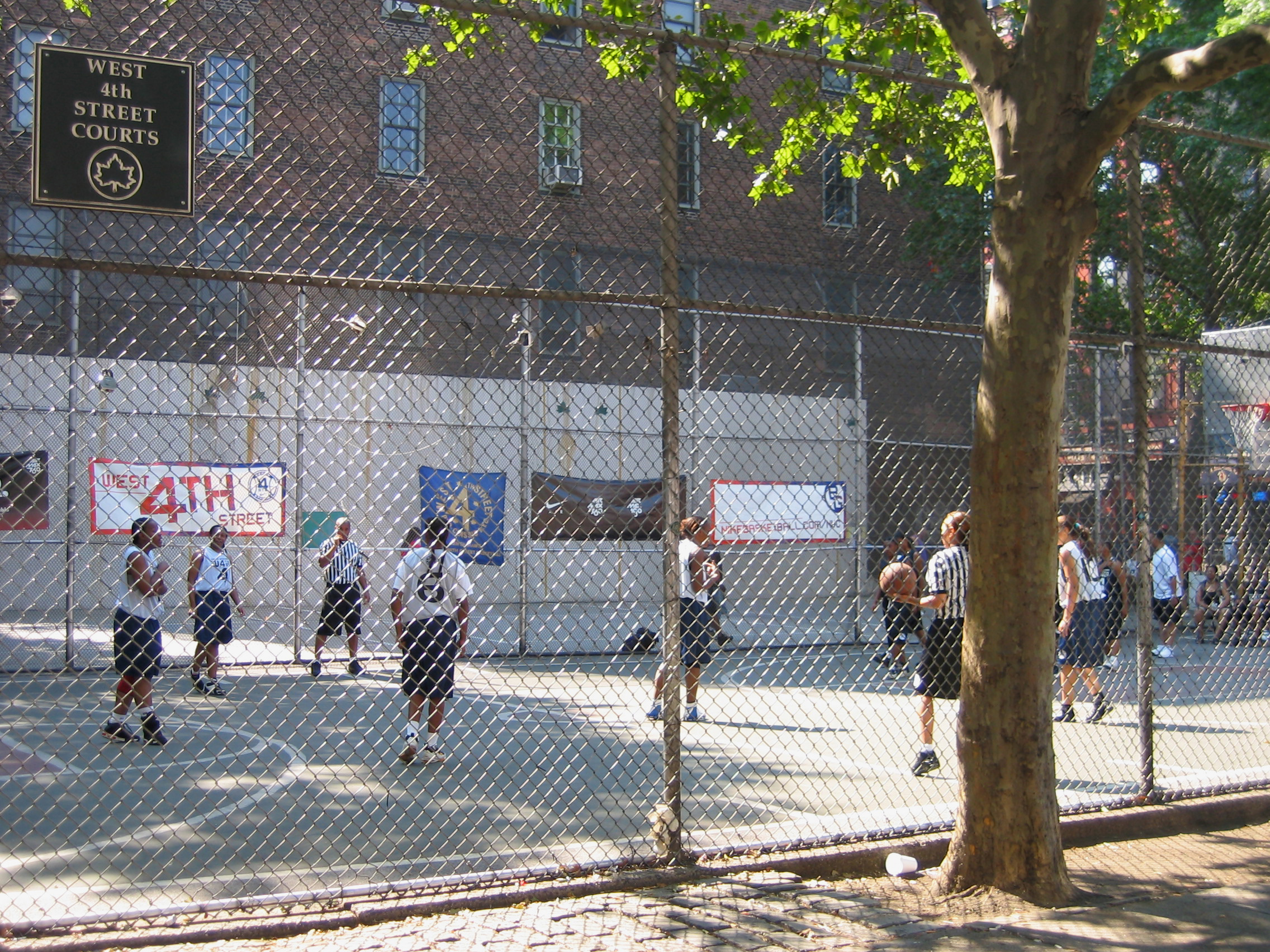
West Fourth Street Courts

The West Fourth Street Courts, also known as "the Cage", are a notable public athletic venue for amateur basketball in the Greenwich Village neighborhood of Manhattan in New York City. "the Cage" has become one of the most important tournament sites for the citywide "Streetball" amateur basketball tournament, and is noted for its non-regulation size.

Due to its small size, there is a greater emphasis on physical play, commonly referred to as "banging inside." The sidelines are often overlooked during gameplay. Given the high number of players participating, competition for playing time is intense, and those who lose typically do not get a second chance to play.

The courts are located over the New York City Subway's West Fourth Street–Washington Square station (A, B, C, D, E, F, <F>, and M trains), an entrance to which is adjacent to the courts.

The West 4th Street League, founded by a limousine driver named Kenny Graham, has carved its own place in asphalt history. Among the notables who have filled the Cage are Dr. J, Walter Berry, and Jayson Williams. Anthony Mason's Prime Time squad won five titles in the early 1990s. West 4th Street officials estimate that their league attracts more than 100,000 spectators each summer, numbers that Rucker Park rivaled only in its heyday during the late 1960s and early 1970s. West 4th's talent is big, but the court's too small to contain all the flying elbows. To some tourists, this may look like a steel-cage wrestling match. "If you don't like a physical brand of basketball, stay away from West 4th."

— A-Train

== Media ==
Numerous national commercials have been shot at the Cage. Former NBA players Anthony Mason and Smush Parker are some of the nationally recognized players to learn their tough style of play from the Cage. The court is depicted in NBA Street V3 and is a playable court in the game.
