= BJW Ante Up =

2001 Big Japan Pro Wrestling event

Ante Up
- Promotional poster featuring various BJW and CZW wrestlers
- Promotion: Big Japan Pro Wrestling
- Date: December 2, 2001
- City: Yokohama, Japan
- Venue: Yokohama Arena
- Attendance: 11,923
- Tagline: BJW vs CZW

Event chronology
← Previous; Crossover	Next → Live in Kawasaki

Ante Up was a professional wrestling supercard event produced by Big Japan Pro Wrestling (BJW). The event took place on December 2, 2001, at the Yokohama Arena in Yokohama, Kanagawa, Japan. The event was themed around BJW's interpromotional rivalry with American promotion Combat Zone Wrestling (CZW).

In the main event match, Daisuke Sekimoto and Men's Teioh defeated Kintaro Kanemura and Ryuji Yamakawa to retain their BJW Tag Team Championship and win Kanemura and Yamakawa's WEW Hardcore Tag Team Championship. In the semi-main event match, CZW's Zandig defeated Mitsuhiro Matsunaga in an exploding glass, light tubes and thumbtacks death match to win the BJW Deathmatch Heavyweight Championship; in other prominent matches, Ruckus defeated The Winger and Trent Acid in a three-way match to win the vacant BJW Junior Heavyweight and CZW World Junior Heavyweight Championships, Badboy Hido defeated Shadow WX in a barbed wire boards death match, and Justice Pain defeated Nick Gage to retain the CZW World Heavyweight Championship.

The event also notably featured the BJW debuts of Mil Máscaras and Terry Funk.

== Production ==
=== Background ===
In early 2000, Big Japan Pro Wrestling (BJW) established a working relationship with American promotion Combat Zone Wrestling (CZW); both promotions emphasized the deathmatch style of wrestling. As part of the working relationship, a stable of CZW wrestlers, dubbed the "CZW Warriors", invaded BJW to start an interpromotional feud. Numerous CZW wrestlers would tour Japan as part of the CZW Warriors including Wifebeater, Nick Gage, Trent Acid, Justice Pain, Johnny Kashmere, Nate Hatred, Ruckus, Nick Berk, "Sick" Nick Mondo, Mad Man Pondo, and Zandig among others. Members of the CZW Warriors would win BJW championships as part of the working relationship and BJW wrestlers would, in turn, tour the United States and win various CZW championships.

In 2001, BJW announced that they would be holding an event at the Yokohama Arena on December 2, titled Ante Up. The event would be themed around the ongoing BJW-CZW interpromotional feud.

=== Storylines ===
Ante Up comprised ten professional wrestling matches, that involved different wrestlers from pre-existing scripted feuds and storylines. Wrestlers portrayed heroes, villains, or less distinguishable characters in scripted events that built tension and culminated in a wrestling match or series of matches.

== Aftermath ==
Following the semi-main event match, Zandig cut a shoot promo on BJW, during which he announced the conclusion of the BJW-CZW working relationship. Zandig would take the BJW Deathmatch Heavyweight Championship belt that he won from Mitsuhiro Matsunaga during the match back to the United States following the event. The championship would later be declared vacant by BJW but CZW would continue to use the physical belt to represent their CZW Death Match Championship for the next two years before returning the belt to Japan.

The event was attended by 11,923 spectators; this remains the largest attendance in BJW history. (Note: Ante Up has the largest live attendance for an event solely promoted by BJW; Wrestling World 1997, an event co-promoted by BJW and New Japan Pro-Wrestling, drew a larger live audience of 62,500 fans.)

== Results ==
No.	Results	Stipulations	Times
1	Hiromi Yagi and Ryuji Ito defeated Marcela and Fantastik	Mixed tag team match	17:08
2	Ruckus defeated The Winger and Trent Acid	Three-way match for the vacant BJW Junior Heavyweight and CZW World Junior Heavyweight Championships	9:58
3	Abdullah Kobayashi, Daikokubō Benkei, and Naoki Numazawa defeated Hideki Hosaka, Kamikaze, and Shunme Matsuzaki	Six-man tag team match	22:46
4	Badboy Hido defeated Shadow WX	Barbed Wire Boards Death match	13:25
5	Jun Kasai defeated Mad Man Pondo, Wifebeater, and Zandig	Four-way CZW-Style 200 Light Tubes Death match	10:57
6	Justice Pain (c) defeated Nick Gage	Singles match for the CZW World Heavyweight Championship	12:15
7	Kung Fu Lee and Mil Máscaras defeated Terry Boy and Terry Funk	Tag team match	13:15
8	Shinjiro Otani defeated Daisuke Sekimoto	Singles match This was the fifth match of Daisuke Sekimoto's Flame 7 Match Series	17:09
9	Zandig defeated Mitsuhiro Matsunaga (c)	Exploding Glass, Light Tubes and Thumbtacks Death match for the BJW Deathmatch Heavyweight Championship	10:38
10	Daisuke Sekimoto and Men's Teioh (BJW) defeated Kintaro Kanemura and Ryuji Yamakawa (WEW)	Winners Take All tag team match for the BJW Tag Team and WEW Hardcore Tag Team Championships	7:40
(c) / – the champion(s) heading into the match

== See also ==
- 2001 in professional wrestling
