= List of CZW World Heavyweight Champions =

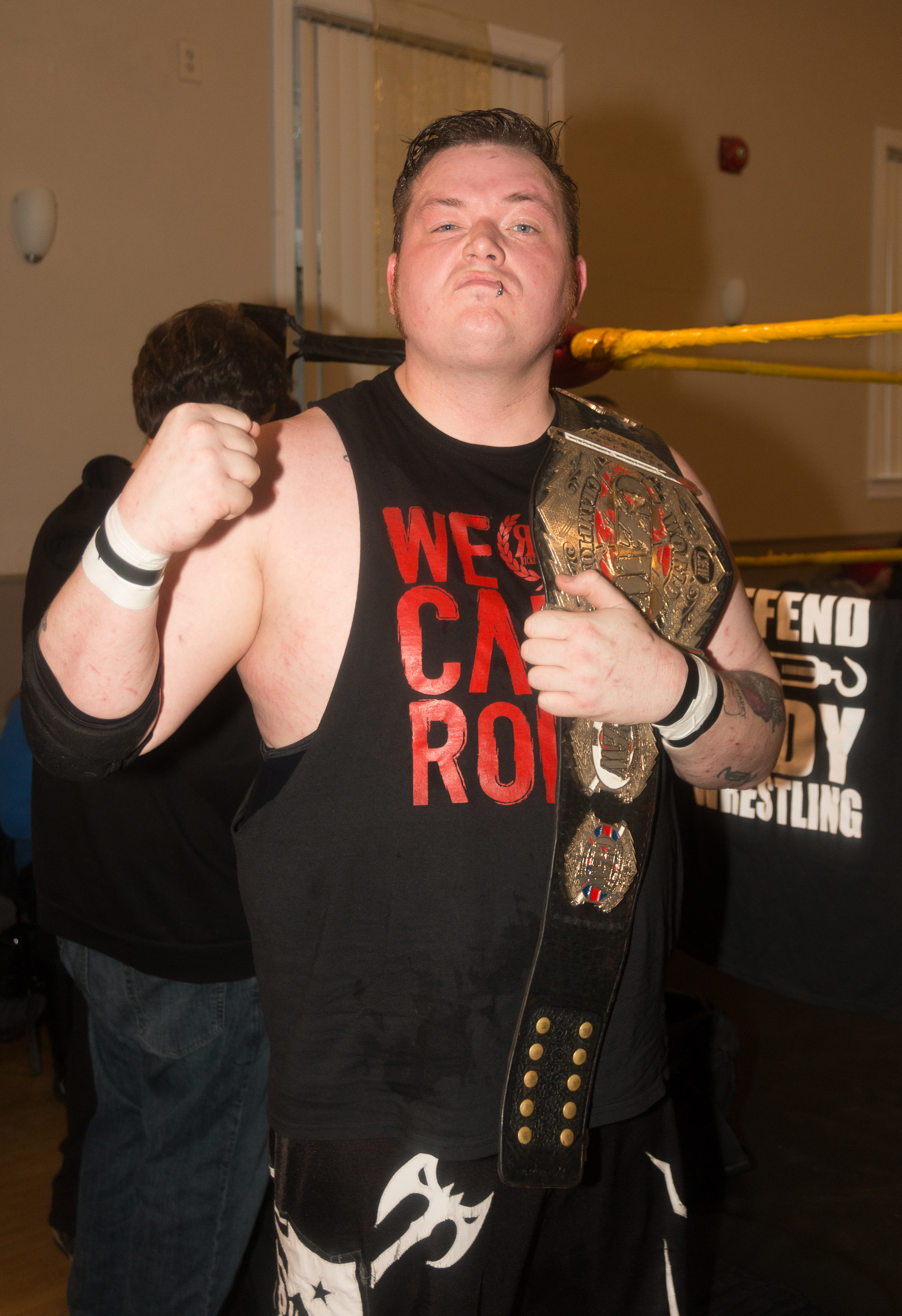
Former CZW World Heavyweight Champion Rickey Shane Page, posing with championship belt

The CZW World Heavyweight Championship is a professional wrestling world heavyweight championship owned and copyrighted by the Combat Zone Wrestling (CZW) promotion. The championship was created and debuted on March 27, 1999, at CZW's The Staple Gun event. The first time the championship changed hands on foreign soil was on April 15, 2001, when Wifebeater defeated John Zandig for the championship in Birmingham, England at a live event.

Title reigns are determined by professionally wrestling matches, usually of the hardcore/ultraviolent type. All title changes happen at live events, which are usually released on DVD. The inaugural champion was Nick Gage, whom CZW recognized to have become the champion after defeating twenty other men in a battle royal on March 27, 1999, at CZW's The Staple Gun event. As of September 28, 2026, Zandig holds the record for most reigns, with six. At 783 days, Eran Ashe's first reign is the longest in the title's history. The current champion is Akira, who is in his second reign.

== Title history ==
Key
No.	Overall reign number
Reign	Reign number for the specific champion
Days	Number of days held

No.	Champion	Championship change			Reign statistics		Notes	Ref.
No.	Champion	Date	Event	Location	Reign	Days	Notes	Ref.
1	Nick Gage	March 27, 1999	The Staple Gun	Mantua Township, NJ	1	56	Gage won a 20-man battle royal to become the first champion.	
2	John Zandig	May 22, 1999	Madness	Mantua Township, NJ	1	28	This was a four-way dance, also involving John Kronus and Justice Pain.	
3	Nick Gage	June 19, 1999	Down in Flames	Mantua Township, NJ	2	91		
4	Wifebeater	September 18, 1999	September Slam	Mantua Township, NJ	1	63		
5	John Zandig	November 20, 1999	The War Begins	Mantua Township, NJ	2	245	This was an I Quit Barbed Wire Strap match.	
6	Lobo	July 22, 2000	No Rules, No Limits	Sewell, NJ	1	49		
7	Justice Pain	September 9, 2000	Cage of Death II...After Dark	Sewell, NJ	1	172	This was a Cage of Death match.	
8	Nick Berk	February 28, 2001	Destruction in Dover	Dover, Delaware	1	<1		
9	Yoshihiro Tajiri	February 28, 2001	Destruction in Dover	Dover, Delaware	1	<1		
10	John Zandig	February 28, 2001	Destruction in Dover	Dover, Delaware	3	46		
11	Wifebeater	April 15, 2001	CZW	Birmingham, England	2	27		
12	John Zandig	May 12, 2001	Stretched in Smyrna	Smyrna, Delaware	4	33	This was a Ultraviolent Deathmatch.	
13	Wifebeater	June 14, 2001	CZW	Aguascalientes, Mexico	3	23		
14	Justice Pain	July 7, 2001	A New Beginning	Sewell, NJ	2	308		
15	The Messiah	May 11, 2002	High Stakes	Philadelphia, PA	1	28	This was a high stakes match which includes first, Messiah's relationship with Kristi Myst, second Nick Mondo's career, and last Adam Flash's CZW Iron Man Championship in a four-way match.	
16	Justice Pain	June 8, 2002	Best of the Best II	Philadelphia, PA	3	7	This was a three-way match where Adam Flash serve as Special Guest Referee and Nick Mondo's CZW Iron Man Championship also on the line.	
17	John Zandig	June 15, 2002	IWW	Dublin, Ireland	5	<1	This was a Barbed Wire Gaelic Deathmatch.	
18	Justice Pain	June 15, 2002	IWW	Dublin, Ireland	4	182	This was a Barbed Wire Gaelic Deathmatch.	
19	The Messiah	December 14, 2002	Cage of Death IV	Philadelphia, PA	2	315	This was an Iron man rules match.	
20	John Zandig	October 25, 2003	Shockwave	Pistoia, Italy	6	133		
21	The Messiah	March 6, 2004	Overdrive	Philadelphia, PA	3	336	This was a Taipei & Bed of Nails Death match.	
22	Ruckus	February 5, 2005	Only the Strong: Scarred 4 Life	Philadelphia, Pennsylvania	1	308		
23	Super Dragon	December 10, 2005	Cage of Death VII: Living in Sin	Philadelphia, Pennsylvania	1	63		
24	Ruckus	February 11, 2006	Seven Years Strong: Settling the Score	Philadelphia, Pennsylvania	2	91	Christopher Daniels won the CZW Championship by pinning Derek Frazier in a three way tournament match at Best of the Best 6, but refused the championship, wanting to win it by pinning Ruckus one on one later in the tournament in a losing effort.	
25	Chris Hero	May 13, 2006	Best of the Best 6	Philadelphia, Pennsylvania	1	119		
26	Eddie Kingston	September 9, 2006	Down with the Sickness 4-Ever: A Tribute to Chris Ca$h	Philadelphia, Pennsylvania	1	91		
27	Justice Pain	December 9, 2006	Cage of Death VIII: Coming Undone	Philadelphia, Pennsylvania	5	217		
28	Ruckus	July 14, 2007	Best of the Best 7	Philadelphia, Pennsylvania	3	147		
29	Nick Gage	December 8, 2007	Cage of Death IX	Philadelphia, Pennsylvania	3	217		
30	Drake Younger	July 12, 2008	A Tangled Web	Philadelphia, Pennsylvania	1	567		
31	B-Boy	January 30, 2010	High Stakes	Philadelphia, Pennsylvania	1	14		
32	Jon Moxley	February 13, 2010	CZW 11th Anniversary Show	Philadelphia, Pennsylvania	1	175		
33	Nick Gage	August 7, 2010	Southern Violence	Lumberton, North Carolina	4	7		
34	Jon Moxley	August 14, 2010	Tangled Web 3	Philadelphia, Pennsylvania	2	182		
35	Robert Anthony	February 12, 2011	CZW 12th Anniversary Show	Philadelphia, Pennsylvania	1	56		
36	Devon Moore	April 9, 2011	Best of the Best X	Philadelphia, Pennsylvania	1	301	This was a six-man tag match between Devon Moore and The Briscoe Brothers, and Robert Anthony and Philadelphia's Most Wanted (Joker and Sabian); where The Briscoes' CZW Tag Team Championship were also on the line.	
37	Scotty Vortekz	February 4, 2012	CZW Super Saturday	Indianapolis, Indiana	1	35		
38	Masada	March 10, 2012	CZW Aerial Assault	Philadelphia, Pennsylvania	1	518	Won title in a four-way match also involving against DJ Hyde and Devon Moore	
39	Drew Gulak	August 10, 2013	CZW Tangled Web 6	Voorhees, New Jersey	1	273		
40	Biff Busick	May 10, 2014	CZW Proving Grounds	Voorhees, New Jersey	1	161	Helped by Sozio as part of "The Front".	
41	Sozio	October 18, 2014	CZW Tangled Web 7	Voorhees, New Jersey	1	56	Turned on his former stablemate Biff Busick	
42	BLK Jeez	December 13, 2014	CZW Cage of Death	Voorhees, New Jersey	1	238	This was a Cage of Death also included Biff Busick and Drew Gulak.	
43	Matt Tremont	August 8, 2015	CZW Heat	Voorhees, New Jersey	1	399		
44	Jonathan Gresham	September 10, 2016	Down With The Sickness 2016	Voorhees, New Jersey	1	91	This was a Four Way Boards Of Nails Carpet Stripes Pains Of Glass Death Match including Greg Excellent and Joe Gacy.	
45	Joe Gacy	December 10, 2016	Cage Of Death 18	Voorhees, New Jersey	1	154		
46	Lio Rush	May 13, 2017	Sacrifices	Voorhees, New Jersey	1	13		
47	Davey Richards	May 26, 2017	Defy 3: Swerve City	Seattle, Washington	1	43	This title change took place at an event held by DEFY Wrestling.	
48	Shane Strickland	July 8, 2017	Evilution	Voorhees, New Jersey	1	126	This was a four-way match, also including Joe Gacy and Lio Rush and contested for the DEFY World Championship.	
49	Joe Gacy	November 11, 2017	Night of Infamy	Sewell, New Jersey	2	<1		
50	Rickey Shane Page	November 11, 2017	Night of Infamy	Sewell, New Jersey	1	154	This was Page's Ultimate Opportunity Coin match.	
51	Maxwell Jacob Friedman	April 14, 2018	Best of the Best 17	Sewell, New Jersey	1	225		
—	Vacated	November 25, 2018	-	-	—	—	Maxwell Jacob Friedman stripped of the title due to injury.	
52	Mance Warner	December 9, 2018	Cage of Death 20	Philadelphia, Pennsylvania	1	125	Warner defeated Rickey Shane Page in a Cage of Death match to win the title.	
53	Anthony Greene	April 13, 2019	Best of the Best 18	Voorhees, New Jersey	1	<1	This was a Fatal 4 Way match also including Anthony Gangone and B-Boy.	
54	David Starr	April 13, 2019	Best of the Best 18	Voorhees, New Jersey	1	<1		
55	John Silver	April 13, 2019	Best of the Best 18	Voorhees, New Jersey	1	153	Defeated Starr in the finals of the Best of the Best tournament.	
56	Joe Gacy	September 13, 2019	Down with the Sickness 2019	Voorhees, New Jersey	3	395	This was triple threat match also including Conor Claxton.	
—	Vacated	October 12, 2020	—	—	—	—	Joe Gacy stripped of the title due to signing to WWE.	
57	Rich Swann	May 20, 2023	CZW Best of the Best	Havre de Grace, Maryland	1	351	Defeated Fred Yehi in the finals of a tournament to win the vacant title.	
58	Eran Ashe	May 5, 2024	CZW Limelight 25	Havre de Grace, Maryland	1	783		
59	AKIRA	June 27, 2026	Tangled Web	Philadelphia, Pennsylvania	1	21		
60	Eran Ashe	July 18, 2026	CZW Blacklight 6	Croydon, Pennsylvania	2	49		
61	AKIRA	September 5, 2026	CZW Tournament of Death XXIIII	Townsend, Delaware	2	14+	Exploding Barbed Wire Match. Took place on Night 1 of CZW Tournament of Death XXIII.	

== Combined reigns ==
†	Indicates the current champion

Rank	Wrestler	No. of reigns	Combined days
1	Justice Pain	5	886
2	Joe Gacy	3	872
3	Eran Ashe	2	832
4	The Messiah	3	679
5	Drake Younger	1	567
6	Ruckus	3	546
7	Masada	1	518
8	John Zandig	6	485
9	Matt Tremont	1	399
10	Nick Gage	4	371
11	Jon Moxley	2	357
12	Rich Swann	1	351
13	Devon Moore	1	301
14	Drew Gulak	1	273
15	BLK Jeez	1	238
16	Maxwell Jacob Friedman	1	225
17	Biff Busick	1	161
18	Rickey Shane Page	1	154
19	John Silver	1	153
20	Shane Strickland	1	126
21	Mance Warner	1	125
22	Chris Hero	1	119
23	Wifebeater	3	113
24	Eddie Kingston	1	91
24	Jonathan Gresham	1	91
26	Super Dragon	1	63
27	Robert Anthony	1	56
27	Sozio	1	56
29	Lobo	1	49
30	Davey Richards	1	43
31	Scotty Vortekz	1	35
32	AKIRA †	2	35+
33	B-Boy	1	14
34	Lio Rush	1	13
35	Anthony Greene	1	<1
35	David Starr	1	<1
35	Nick Berk	1	<1
35	Yoshihiro Tajiri	1	<1
