= CZW Hall of Fame =

Professional wrestling hall of fame

The CZW Hall of Fame is an American professional wrestling hall of fame maintained by the Philadelphia-based hardcore-oriented promotion Combat Zone Wrestling. It was established in 2004 to honor wrestlers who have wrestled for the promotion.

== Inductees ==
| Year | Ring name (Birth name) | CZW Recognized Accolades |
|---|---|---|
| 2004 | Lobo (Joe Eubanks) | One-time CZW World Heavyweight Champion, one-time CZW World Tag Team Champion, three-time CZW Iron Man Champion, and One-time CZW Interpromotional Hardcore Champion. |
| 2004 | Nick Mondo (Matthew T. Burns) | Three-times CZW Iron Man Champion, one-time CZW World Tag Team Champion, Tournament of Death II winner |
| 2009 | Jon Dahmer (Jonathan Dahmer) | Three-times CZW World Tag Team Champion. |
| 2009 | Nick Gage (Nicholas W. Wilson) | First and four-time CZW World Heavyweight Champion, Two-time Iron Man Champion, Four-time CZW World Tag Team Championship, Two-time CZW Ultraviolent Underground Champion, One-time CZW Death Match Champion, One-time CZW Interpromotional Hardcore Champion, Tournament of Death V winner, one-time BJW Tag Team Champion |
| 2009 | Wifebeater (Matthew Prince) | Three-time CZW World Heavyweight Champion, four-time CZW Iron Man Champion, one-time CZW World Tag Team Championship, Tournament of Death I, One-time CZW Death Match Champion and III winner |
| 2014 | D. J. Hyde (David John Markland) | CZW Owner since 2009. Three-time CZW Iron Man Champion and Tournament of Death VIII winner |
| 2015 | Ruckus (Claude Marrow) | Three-time CZW World Heavyweight Champion, five-time CZW World Tag Team Champion, Two-time CZW World Junior Heavyweight Champion, Best of the Best VI winner. |
| 2015 | Robbie Mireno (Rob Ziccardi) | Two-time CZW World Tag Team Champion, long time manager, former ring announcer. |
| 2016 | Drake Younger (Drake Wuertz) | One-time and Longest CZW World Heavyweight Champion, two-time CZW Ultraviolent Underground Champion, one-time CZW World Junior Heavyweight Champion, one-time CZW World Tag Team Champion, Tournament of Death VI winner, Best of the Best XIII winner |
| 2017 | Kevin Hogan | Posthumous inductee. Wrestling fan who attended CZW since the 90's. |
| 2018 | Larry Legend (Larry Mercer) | Long time Ring Announcer. |
| 2018 | Toby Klein (Toby Cline) | One-time CZW Iron Man Champion & One-time CZW World Tag Team Champion |
| 2018 | Nate Hatred (Nathan Kehner) | Posthumous inductee. One-time CZW Iron Man Champion, Three-time CZW World Tag Team Champion, & Two-Time CZW Death Match Champion He had died in a car accident eight days earlier. |
| 2019 | Sonjay Dutt (Retesh Bhalla) | Two-time CZW World Junior Heavyweight Champion. Best of the Best IV winner. |
| 2019 | The Messiah (William C. Welch) | Three-time CZW World Heavyweight Champion, One-time CZW Iron Man Champion |
| 2019 | Adam Flash (Douglas Becker) | Two-time CZW Iron Man Champion |
| 2019 | LuFisto (Genevieve Goulet) | First woman to become the CZW Iron Man Champion |
| 2019 | B-Boy (Benito Cuntapay) | One-time CZW World Heavyweight Champion, One-time CZW Iron Man Champion, Best of the Best III winner, Xtreme Strong Style Tournament 2004 winner |
| 2019 | Trent Acid (Michael Verdi) | Posthumous inductee. One-time CZW Iron Man Champion, Three-time CZW Junior Heavyweight Champion, Four-time CZW Tag Team Champion, Best of the Best II winner. |
| 2020 | Necro Butcher (Dylan Summers) | One-time CZW Tag Team Champion, Winner of Tournament of Death IV. |
| 2020 | Shawn Kernaghan | Long-time CZW staffer. |
| 2021 | DK Meadows (Daykwon Meadows) | 3-year CZW wrestler |
| 2022 | Jimmy Rave (James Michael Guffey) | Posthumous inductee. One-time CZW Iron Man Championship, International wrestler, & for his dedications and contributions towards CZW. |
| 2025 | James Figueiredo | Long-time eighteen year CZW production staffer. Staging, Live Sound, Camera Operator, Video Editor, Graphics, Head of Audio/Video Production. |
| 2025 | Justice Pain (Chris Wilson) | Posthumous inductee. Five-time CZW World Heavyweight Champion, four-time CZW World Tag Team Champion, two-time CZW Iron Man Champion, one-time CZW Junior Heavyweight Champion. Member of the H8 Club. Brother of Nick Gage. |

== See also ==
- List of professional wrestling halls of fame

== Sources ==
- Inductees – Ring name / CZW debut / Year : CZW Hall of Fame
