= Nick Mondo =

American professional wrestler (born 1980)

- Born: Matthew Timothy Burns; March 28, 1980 (age 46); Minneapolis, Minnesota, U.S.
- Other name: Matthew T. Burns
- Occupations: Filmmaker; actor; stuntman; retired professional wrestler
- Professional wrestling career
- Ring name(s): Nick Mondo; Pepperoni Tony
- Billed height: 6 ft 1 in (1.85 m)
- Billed weight: 202 lb (92 kg)
- Trained by: Bodyslammers Gym
- Debut: March 1999
- Retired: July 26, 2003

Matthew Timothy Burns (born March 28, 1980), better known by his ring name "Sick" Nick Mondo, is an American actor, filmmaker, stuntman, and retired professional wrestler. Since his in-ring retirement in 2003, he has become a filmmaker, actor and stuntman and, at one point, worked with All Elite Wrestling as director.

Burns is best known for his appearances with Combat Zone Wrestling (CZW). He was known throughout his career for his willingness to take extremely dangerous bumps, such as being hit with a weed whacker, getting thrown into a table covered with barbed wire, slammed from a distance of 20+ feet onto light tubes and concrete and other ultraviolent spots. In 2004, Burns was inducted into CZW's Hall of Fame.

== Professional wrestling career ==
=== Early career (1999–2000) ===
During his start out in 1999 in Pennsylvania Championship Wrestling, he would feud with the likes of Eddie Valentine.

=== Combat Zone Wrestling (2000–2003) ===
==== Teaming and feuding with Ric Blade (2000–2001) ====
His CZW debut was on May 6, 2000 against Trent Acid, at A Living Hell. At Caged to the End on June 10, 2000, he was involved in a Three Way Dance against Mercury and Ty Street. He fought Justice Pain on June 25, 2000, in a field near the Champs Arena, titled They Said It Couldn't Be Done. A few months later, he teamed up with Ric Blade and fought The Backseat Boyz (Trent Acid and Johnny Kashmere), which saw Blade end the match with a Swanton bomb off the Champs Arena wall through two stacked tables with Acid on top and Kashmere on a bottom table. They won the CZW World Tag Team Championships around this time; but eventually split and began a feud with one another after losing the titles to the original H8 Club of Justice Pain and Wifebeater.

The feud would still go on as at Crushing The Competition on February 10, 2001 in Sewell, New Jersey, Blade would team up with Super Crazy to take on Mondo in a Handicap 3-way ladder match. The feud would end in a "Barbed Wire Ladder Match" as well a huge Swanton bomb an off the Champs Arena wall from Blade on to Mondo through a table. Blade won the match with a moonsault from the top rope with a ladder he positioned under Mondo, breaking Mondo's nose in the process.

==== Iron Man Champion (2001–2002) ====
Mondo's first title capture was the CZW Iron Man Championship, against Wifebeater and Mad Man Pondo at Breakaway Brawl in June 2001. Mondo was involved the extremely violent 6 man tag team match teaming with Zandig, Wifebeater against The Backseat Boyz and Justice Pain at H8 Club Dead? in July 2001, in this match his back was a mess of blood. Mondo was in a no rope barbed wire match in the pouring rain against Nick Gage at And Justice And For All in August 2001, he was splashed through a table by Gage, and lost the Iron Man Championship. He failed to recapture the Iron Man Championship a Falls Count Anywhere three way against Adam Flash and Nick Berk at CZW's biggest show ever Cage of Death III in December 15, 2001, losing to Flash.

He had numerous memorable bouts during this run to capture the CZW World Heavyweight Championship; the first battle with Messiah at This Time it's Personal in February 2002, taking Justice Pain to his limit and coming within an eyelash of winning the World title at A Higher Level of Pain in April 2002, and a 64-minute four way classic with Messiah, Flash and Pain at High Stakes, where he won the Iron Man Championship in a double pin.

==== Final years and Tournament of Death winner (2002–2003) ====
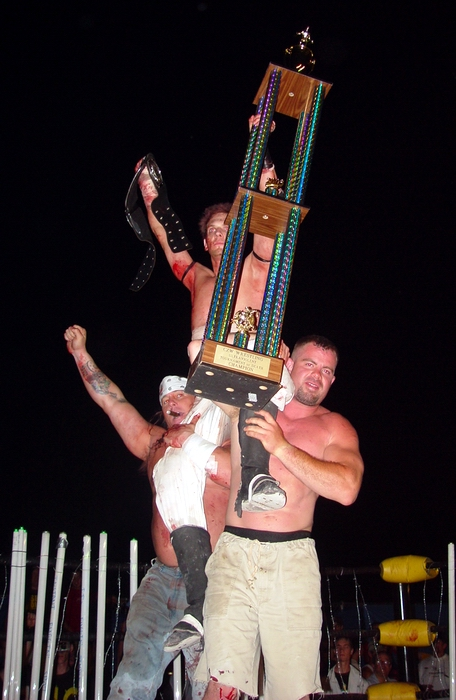
Mondo on the shoulders of Zandig and Wifebeater, after winning the Tournament of Death in 2003

Mondo fought Messiah in the first round and came up short against Wifebeater at CZW's first Tournament of Death in a memorable spot where Mondo received a weedwhacker to the stomach. However, Mondo and Wifebeater would team up to face Necro Butcher and "Mr Insanity" Toby Klein at Ultraviolent Freedom of Expression on September 14, 2002. His partner Blade returned at Beyond The Barrier on October 12, 2002, with Mondo defeating Johnny Kashmere. At Cage of Death IV on December 13, 2002, he competed in a Tables, Ladders, and Chairs match against The Backseat Boyz with Mondo as his partner but ended up losing. The Backseats won in the end with the Acid Bomb whilst Blade's head was in the ladder. Mondo failed to capture the CZW Death Match Championship a three-way with Zandig and Nate Hatred at Live Again in January 2003. Mondo had his swan song with a bump that will never be forgotten against Zandig, and a victory over Ian Rotten to win CZW's 2nd annual Tournament of Death in July 2003.

=== Retirement (2003) ===
Burns retired in 2003 after suffering several injuries during his career, the last of which was a severely punctured back which he suffered during his match against John Zandig at Tournament of Death II (which Burns won), a match in which he was already wrestling with three broken bones in his right wrist. There was a rumour that Burns was to return at CZW's Cage Of Death XII, but it was false. In addition to his ring work, Burns has been featured as a playable character in Backyard Wrestling 2: There Goes the Neighborhood along with Zandig.

=== Post-retirement appearances (2013–2017) ===
Burns would make his return to CZW at their Cage of Death XV Internet pay-per-view, as he would run down to the ring to help Lucky 13 during his match against the Forgotten Ones. Afterwards, Rory "Little" Mondo came back out, having been eliminated earlier in the match, shocked to see his idol in the ring again. He then told Mondo that he returned to the promotion to prevent his successor from mutilating himself in his name, and that he had earned his respect. Upon hearing this, Mondo retired from professional wrestling. Burns would make his in-ring return on July 21, 2017 for Brian Kendrick's Wrestling Pro Wrestling as Pepperoni Tony, where he would team with Chow Mein Charlie to defeat The Delivery Boys. He would wrestle again for Wrestling Pro Wrestling on August 25, teaming with General Tso Tso to wrestle Rubber Baby Leather Daddy to a no-contest.

=== Jon Moxley and All Elite Wrestling (2019–2020) ===
In a May 2019 interview with Pro Wrestling Sheet's Ryan Satin, it was revealed that Burns had directed the video marking the return of Jon Moxley, following his departure from WWE. Burns confirmed that, contrary to popular opinion, the Viper Room's logo was not a reference to the All Elite Wrestling (AEW) Double or Nothing event (in which Moxley would indeed make a surprise appearance) but rather a tribute to Dusty Rhodes, Moxley's mentor at Florida Championship Wrestling. Burns also directed the hype video for Moxley's debut in New Japan Pro-Wrestling, which included the use of cowboy boots and a jacket with the flag of the United Kingdom on it, in order to mislead fans on who the wrestler actually was. Satin admitted he was guilty of this as well, since he was too busy looking for clues, and had not realised that his cousin was in the video, which led to the interview with Burns taking place. Burns directed another hype video, which came out in late July, promoting Moxley's match against Josh Barnett at Game Changer Wrestling's Bloodsport 2; a match that ultimately did not happen (but was later rescheduled), due to Moxley having surgery to remove a MRSA staph infection in his elbow. By the end of the year, Burns had begun working with AEW as a director. However, he was released during the COVID-19 pandemic.

== Filmography ==
=== Films ===
Year	Film	Role	Credited as					Notes	Ref.
Year	Film	Role	Director	Producer	Writer	Editor	Actor	Notes	Ref.
2004	Unscarred: The Life of Nick Mondo	Himself	Yes	Yes	Yes	Yes	Yes		
2006	Fighting the Still Life	—N/a	Yes	Yes	Yes	Yes	No	Unreleased	
2008	Incubus Drone	—N/a	No	No	Yes	No	No	Short film	
2014	Match Perfect	—N/a	Yes	No	Yes	No	No	Short film	
2014	Pieces of 8	—N/a	No	No	No	No	No	Video short First assistant director, props	
2015	Finding Beauty in the Rubble	—N/a	Yes	No	No	Yes	No	Documentary short Cinematographer	
2017	The Trade	—N/a	Yes	Yes	Yes	Yes	Yes		
2019	Fredo	—N/a	No	No	Yes	Yes	No		
2021	The Claw	—N/a	No	No	No	No	No	Stunt coordinator	
2026	Refuge	—N/a	No	Yes	No	No	No	Documentary; Stunt coordinator / stunt performer	
TBA	2 Criminals	—N/a	Yes	Yes	Yes	Yes	No		
TBA	The Searcher	The Frogman	No	No	No	No	Yes		

=== Television ===
Year	Show	Role	Credited as					Notes	Ref.
Year	Show	Role	Director	Producer	Writer	Editor	Actor	Notes	Ref.
2021	Heels	—N/a	No	No	No	No	No	3 episodes Stunt coordinator / stunt performer	
2021	Thicker	Basement Guard #4	No	No	No	No	Yes	TV movie Originally titled Thicker Than Thieves	
2022	The Resident	—N/a	No	No	No	No	No	Episode: "Peek and Shriek"; Stunt double for Levi Meaden	
2023	Class of '09	—N/a	No	No	No	No	No	Episode: "Part of Something"; Stunt double for Brian J. Smith	

=== Video games ===
Year	Game	Role	Notes	Ref.			
Year	Game	2004	Notes	Ref.	Backyard Wrestling 2: There Goes the Neighborhood	Himself	Stunts / stunt actor
2012	Resident Evil 6	—N/a	Stunt actor				
2016	Pro Evolution Soccer 2017	—N/a	Stunts				
2017	Pro Evolution Soccer 2018	—N/a	Stunts				
2020	Gears Tactics	—N/a	Stunt actor / performer				

== Championships and accomplishments ==
- Combat Zone Wrestling
  - CZW Iron Man Championship (3 times)
  - CZW World Tag Team Championship (1 time) – with Ric Blade
  - Tournament of Death (II)
  - CZW Hall of Fame (2004)
  - Match of the Year (2002) vs. Wifebeater
  - Match of the Year (2003) vs. Justice Pain
