= Eddie Valentine =

American professional wrestler

Personal information
- Born: April 20, 1978 (age 48) Skippack, Pennsylvania
- Spouse: Chase Miller (m. 2005; died 2019)

Professional wrestling career
- Ring name(s): Fast Eddie; Eddie Valentine
- Billed height: 5 ft 11 in (180 cm)
- Billed weight: 220 lb (100 kg)
- Trained by: Glen Osbourne; Afa Anoa'i
- Debut: 1998

Thomas Weiss (born 20 April 1978), better known by his ring name Eddie Valentine, is an American professional wrestler best known for his time in Combat Zone Wrestling (CZW).

== Professional wrestling career ==
=== Independent circuit (1998–present) ===
Weiss participated in the BJW Go Way Series 2002, a multiple-night event promoted by Big Japan Pro-Wrestling, where on February 3, 2002, he teamed up with Z-Barr in a losing effort to Daisaku Shimoda and Ryuji Yamakawa. He competed against other wrestlers on other nights of the event such as on the third, from February 8, where he fell short to Bad Boy Hido or the sixth night, on February 11, where he teamed up again with Z-Barr in a losing effort to Ryuji Yamakawa and Kintaro Kanemura. He worked at a house show match promoted by Pro Warrior Alliance on August 5, 2017, where he defeated Core. On July 10, 2011, Weiss participated in the Acid Fest - A Tribute To Trent Acid event created in memoriam of Trent Acid, where he competed in a battle royal against multiple wrestlers such as the winner Helter Skelter, Balls Mahoney, The Messiah, Adam Flash, Rockin' Rebel and Darren Wyse. At ACW/Rogue Fallout, an event promoted by Atomic Championship Wrestling on September 19, 2019, Weiss competed in a four-way match for the ACW Heavyweight Championship unsuccessfully against the champion Shatter, Nate Hared and Hayne.

=== Combat Zone Wrestling (CZW) (2001-2002) ===
Weiss made his debut for Combat Zone Wrestling at CZW Delaware Invasion on January 20, 2001, where he teamed up with The Briscoe Brothers (Mark Briscoe and Jay Briscoe) and lost to Trent Acid in a 3-on-1 handicap match. Weiss also teamed up with John Dahmer as VD at CZW Out With The Old, In With The New 2002 on March 9, to defeat The Backseat Boyz (Johnny Kashmere and Trent Acid) to win the CZW World Tag Team Championship. They challenged again for the titles at CZW Un F'n Believable on April 14, 2001, unsuccessfully battling The H8 Club (Nate Hatred and Nick Gage). Weiss participated in a 19-man battle royal for the no.1 contendership at the CZW Iron Man Championship at CZW Best Of The Best II on June 8, 2002, competing against other popular wrestlers such as the winner Justice Pain, Adam Flash and The Messiah. On August 10, 2002, at CZW No Excuses, Weiss competed in a loser leaves promotion match in which he lost to Ian Knoxx resulting in Weiss leaving CZW.

== Personal life ==
Weiss is openly gay and fights against intolerance and hatred as he stated back in 2009. He was married to his husband Chase from 2005 until the latter's death on November 28, 2019.

== Championships and accomplishments ==
- Combat Zone Wrestling
  - CZW World Tag Team Championship (1 time) - with John Dahmer
- Lancaster Championship Wrestling
  - LCW Tag Team Championship (1 time) - with Adrian Bliss and Boy Boy
- Pennsylvania Championship Wrestling
  - PCW Commonwealth Heavyweight Championship (1 time)
- Pro Wrestling Illustrated
  - Ranked No. 440 of the top 500 singles wrestlers in the PWI 500 in 2025
- Valour Pro Wrestling
  - VPW Champion Of Valour (1 time)
