= Adam Flash =

American professional wrestler

Personal information
- Born: Douglas Allen Becker; October 22, 1971 (age 55) York, Pennsylvania, U.S.

Professional wrestling career
- Ring name(s): Adam Flash; Atom Flash; Doug Becker; The Honey Comb Kid; The Kabuki Kid; Tyler Martin
- Billed height: 6 ft 0 in (1.83 m)
- Billed weight: 210 lb (95 kg)
- Billed from: Seattle, Washington
- Trained by: Max Thrasher; Curt Dread
- Debut: 1991
- Retired: 2014

Douglas Adam Becker (born on October 22, 1971) is an American retired professional wrestler better known by his ring name Adam Flash. Over his career, he has worked for various independent promotions, including Maryland Championship Wrestling, Independent Wrestling Association Mid-South, and Combat Zone Wrestling. In addition, he also made short appearances in Extreme Championship Wrestling, World Championship Wrestling and Total Nonstop Action Wrestling.

Flash's exposure in CZW led him to get a few other promotions. For one instance, his participation in Steve Corino's Pennsylvania/Premier Wrestling Federation has seen him be matched up against The S.A.T. and Christopher Daniels (who he wrestled in the first round of the 2001 Legacy Cup Tournament), among others. Flash's most recent success outside of CZW has transpired in IWA Mid-South.

== Early career ==
Becker started watching wrestling around five years old and began competing in amateur wrestling. He was trained in a place in York called the Circus Asylum and was trained by Max Thrasher and Curt Dread.

Becker made his professional debut in November 1991, teaming with "Ramblin'" Rich Myers against a tag team known as The Outrageous Ones.

=== World Championship Wrestling ===
In 1995, Becker competed in a series of World Championship Wrestling house shows under his real name, where he was used as a jobber and lost to the likes of Scott Norton, Japanese stars Shinjiro Otani and Koji Kanemoto, Frank Andersson, Bunkhouse Buck and Chris Benoit on a few episodes of Saturday Night and Pro.

=== Extreme Championship Wrestling ===
Becker, as Adam Flash, made his Extreme Championship Wrestling debut on December 27, 1997, in Blackwood, New Jersey, when he lost to Paul Diamond. Half a month later on January 16 in Rostraver Township, Pennsylvania, Becker happened to be at an ECW show when it was realized that Sabu didn't have an opponent. As a result, officials managed to get Becker to do a quick jobbing for Sabu. Becker's next ECW appearance was on January 31, when he was scheduled to take on Big Dick Dudley, only to be attacked as he was walking to the ring by Taz. Taz then proceeded to assault Dick and his Dudley "brothers", Buh Buh Ray and D-Von, before cutting a promo in which he spoke harshly about then-rival Bam Bam Bigelow. Flash didn't work another ECW show for almost year, as his next and as it turned out, final appearance the promotion was on December 17 (almost the one-year anniversary of his ECW debut) when he served as the opponent of future- Baldies member Spanish Angel on a show in Allentown, Pennsylvania. Flash kept himself occupied in '98, besides the rare ECW booking.

=== Total Nonstop Action Wrestling ===
Becker made his debut in TNA, losing to Monty Brown on September 3, 2004.

=== Independent circuit ===
During his stint in ECW, Flash teamed up with Steve Corino on the independent circuit and the team became known as the Lethal Weapon. The Lethal Weapon would go on to win several tag team championships from various independent promotions before their partnership eventually came to an end. Following their dissolution, they had a couple of matches with one another throughout 1997, both in the Mid-Eastern Wrestling Federation and in the American Wrestling Council, with a match occurring in the latter promotion's "Great Eight" tournament.

=== Combat Zone Wrestling ===
In his Combat Zone Wrestling debut, Flash wrestled Nick Berk. After working some tag team matches with his new tag team partner Danny Rose, Flash took part in the Cage of Death III show, which occurred on December 15, 2001, and served as the promotion's debut event at Viking Hall (the former ECW Arena). On that card, he captured the Iron Man Championship from Nick Berk in a three-way match that also included "Sick" Nick Mondo. On May 11, 2002, Flash lost the title to Mondo. However, Flash soon regained the title after he defeated Justice Pain on July 13 before losing it to The Messiah on October 12. In Cage of Death 5, he was a member of the HI-V, but was eliminated when Wifebeater hit a sidewalk slam off the super scaffold/cage into the thumbtack tacks on Adam Flash, In Cage of Death 6, he would face Messiah and Kaos for the CZW World Heavyweight Championship, but did not win the match. Later he would feud with Kaos in a Falls Count Anywhere Match, Early 2006/07 he would start a stable known a Pandora's Box with B. J. Whitmer and Pandora.

=== IWA Mid South ===
On August 2, 2003, Becker made his IWA Mid-South debut (the second night of the promotion's King of the Deathmatches Tournament Weekend doubleheader) by teaming with fellow CZW star Sonjay Dutt to win a triangle tag team match. Flash didn't work for the promotion again until February 13, 2004, when he defeated Austin Aries.

=== Maryland Championship Wrestling ===
On November 17, 2000, Flash debuted and captured his second heavyweight title, that of MCW, and dropping it just half a month later (right back to Jimmy Cicero) didn't take away any of his intensity, as he regained the belt on May 18, 2001. Six days before recapturing the championship, Half a month before Flash made his IWA-Mid South debut, he participated on the final MCW show ever, entitled "The Last Dance: The Shane Shamrock Memorial Cup." The event came on July 16 and Flash who had consistently wrestled for MCW since mid-1998, lost his MEWF Cruiserweight Title to Michael "Crash Holly" Lockwood. On July 9, 2006, Adam Flash and Corporal Punishment ended in a No Contest, then Adam Flash pinned Julio Dinero (who had issued an open challenge) to capture the MCW Heavyweight title. On September 9, 2006, Adam Flash still defeated Julio Dinero to retain the MCW Heavyweight title until he lost it to Danny Doring in a No Holds Barred match to win the MCW Heavyweight Championship. However, Kimberley McDevitt changed the rules of the match, eliminating the "No Holds Barred" stipulation, The decision was reversed and Kimberly McDevitt awarded the match and the MCW Heavyweight title to Adam Flash.

=== Pro Wrestling Unplugged ===
On, December 15, 2007, Flash won a "Chance Of A Lifetime" Battle Royal, later on to defeat Too Cold Scorpio to win the PWU World Heavyweight title.

=== Combat Zone Wrestling (2014) ===
He returned to CZW Down With The Sickness 2014 event in an 8 Man Tag Team Match.

== Championships and accomplishments ==
- Combat Zone Wrestling
  - CZW Iron Man Championship (2 times)
  - CZW Hall of Fame (class of 2019)
- Eastern Wrestling Federation
  - EWF Heavyweight Championship (1 time)
- Future Wrestling Alliance
  - FWA Tag Team Championship (2 times) – with Danny Rose
- Independent Pro Wrestling Alliance
  - IPWA Tag Team Championship (1 time) – with Steve Corino
- Maryland Championship Wrestling
  - MCW Cruiserweight Championship (4 times)
  - MCW Heavyweight Championship (3 times)
  - MCW Hall of Fame (Class of 2009)
- Mid-Eastern Wrestling Federation
  - MEWF Mid-Atlantic Heavyweight Championship (1 time)
  - MEWF Cruiserweight Championship (1 time)
  - MEWF Light Heavyweight Championship (2 times)
  - MEWF Tag Team Championship (1 time)^{1} – with Romeo Valentino and Quinn Nash
- National Championship Wrestling
  - NCW Heavyweight Championship (3 times)
  - NCW Tag Team Championship (1 time)
- Pennsylvania Wrestling Federation / Premier Wrestling Federation
  - PWF Universal Tag Team Championship (1 time) - with Danny Rose
- Pro Wrestling Illustrated
  - PWI ranked him #232 of the 500 best singles wrestlers in the PWI 500 in 2008
- Pro Wrestling Unplugged
  - PWU World Heavyweight Championship (1 time)
- Regional Championship Wrestling
  - RCW United States Tag Team Championship (2 times) - with Lucifer and Ranger 7

^{1}The MEWF Tag Team Championship was held jointly with Valentino and Nash as a member of Menace 2 Society using the Freebird Rule.

== Personal life ==
According to Becker, his most memorable matches were against Sabu during his stint in Extreme Championship Wrestling, Eddie Guerrero during his time in Maryland Championship Wrestling, and Jeff Jarrett and Chris Benoit during his stint in World Championship Wrestling. Becker is married to Stephanie Ann Nixon Flash; they have 2 sons.
