= Brain Damage (wrestler) =

American professional wrestler (1977–2012)

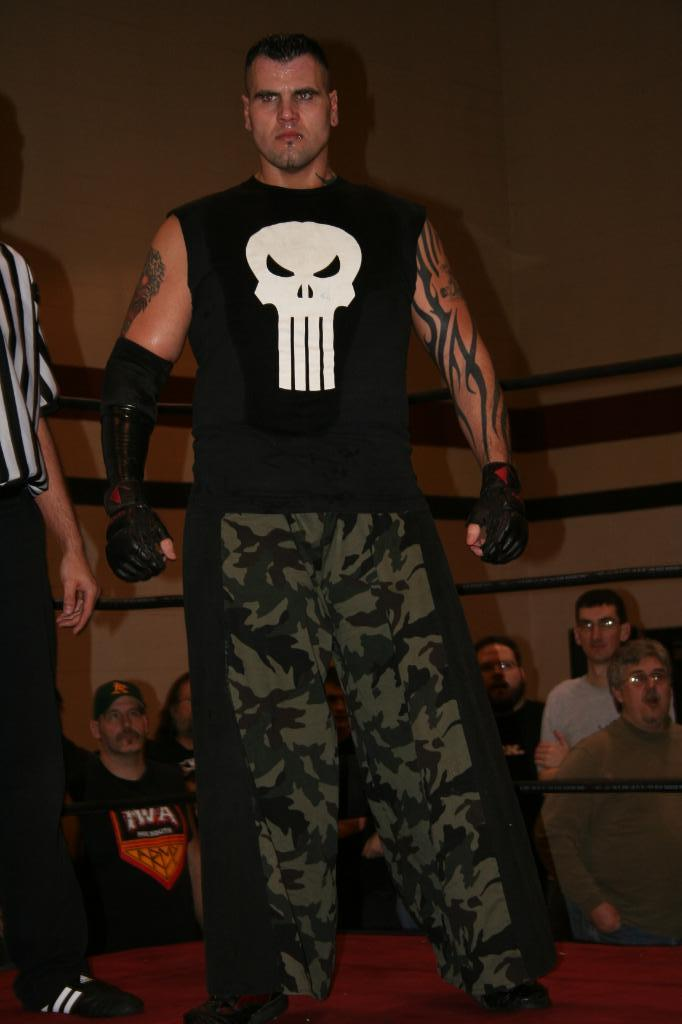
- Brain Damage in 2008

Personal information
- Born: Marvin Lambert; December 14, 1977 Mansfield, Ohio, U.S.
- Died: October 18, 2012 (aged 34)
- Cause of death: Suicide

Professional wrestling career
- Ring name: Brain Damage
- Billed height: 6 ft 4 in (1.93 m)
- Billed weight: 271 lb (123 kg)
- Billed from: The Cult Fiction Compound by way of Cleveland, Ohio
- Trained by: Toby Klein
- Debut: 2000
- Retired: 2011

Marvin Lambert (December 14, 1977 – October 18, 2012), best known by his ring name Brain Damage, was an American professional wrestler.

Brain Damage competed for a number of different promotions throughout his career, but is best known for his work in Independent Wrestling Association Mid-South (IWA Mid-South) and Combat Zone Wrestling (CZW). In IWA Mid-South, Brain Damage formed a tag team with Deranged, known as the Vulgar Display of Power. They won the IWA Mid-South Tag Team Championship once and also won the IWA Mid-South Double Death Tag Team Tournament in both 2007 and 2008. In CZW, Brain Damage is a two time CZW Iron Man Champion and a two time CZW Ultraviolent Underground Champion. He held both the Iron Man Championship and the Ultraviolent Underground Championship simultaneously.

== Career ==
=== Independent Wrestling Association Mid-South ===
Brain Damage began wrestling in Independent Wrestling Association Mid-South (IWA Mid-South) in 2000, making his first appearance at the second night of the King of the Death Match tournament on October 21. He defeated his trainer, Toby Klein, in a singles match that was not a part of the tournament. His next appearance for the promotion was in 2005, when he competed in the 2005 edition of the annual King of the Deathmatch tournament. He lost his first round match, an "Unlucky Seven Staple Gun match" on the first night of the tournament to Mitch Page and Tank, who both qualified for the second round.

In 2006, Damage began competing primarily for IWA Mid-South. It was during this time that he formed the tag team the Vulgar Display of Power with Deranged, with the two making their first IWA Mid-South appearance on January 20, 2006, at The Edge of Insanity, where they unsuccessfully challenged for the NWA Midwest Tag Team Championship in a scramble match. Just under a month later at Hardcore Hell and Back on February 17, the Vulgar Display of Power lost to Necro Butcher and Toby Klein in a three-way street fight, which also involved the team of Corporal Robinson and Mitch Page. The following night, at Payback, Pain and Agony, Damage lost to Klein in a singles match. After a short hiatus, Damage returned to IWA Mid-South at the end of March, when the Vulgar Display of Power defeated Corporal Robinson and Hardcore Craig at Hurt. A week later, at We're No Joke, Team Underground (Chandler McClure and Eric Priest) defeated the Vulgar Display of Power, however, the Vulgar Display of Power were able to defeat The Iron Saints (Sal and Vito Thomaselli) at the following show. In June, Damage competed in the 2006 King of the Deathmatch tournament, defeating Darin Childs, his tag team partner Deranged, and Tank en route to the final, where he lost in a four-way "House of Pain Total Elimination match". Following the tournament, Damage took another hiatus from IWA Mid-South, returning in August at Simply the Best 7, when the Vulgar Display of Power defeated Ian Rotten and Drake Younger to win the IWA Mid-South Tag Team Championship. The following night, Damage defeated Younger in a "first to two straight falls barbed wire board barbed wire bat match".

Following this match, in October, Damage announced his retirement from professional wrestling and vacated the IWA Mid-South Tag Team Championship. Despite this, Damage returned to wrestling a few months later, and eventually returned to IWA Mid-South in June 2007 competing at the 2007 King of the Deathmatch tournament, where he reached the semi-finals before losing to Freakshow. The Vulgar Display of Power defeated The Devil's Rejects (Tank and Iceberg) and Six Feet Under (Insane Lane and Freakshow) and Darin Childs and Massive in a four-way tag team hardcore rumble match at Point Proven later that month, before taking another hiatus until October. On October 26, the Vulgar Display of Power won the 2007 Double Death Tag Team Tournament by defeating Ian Rotten and Insane Lane in a House of Horrors match in the final.

Damage did not appear in IWA Mid-South again until March 2008, when the Vulgar Display of Power accompanied to the ring by HalfBreed Billy Gram, defeated Mean n' Hard (Mitch Page and Rollin Hard) at IWA Mid-South's 500th show. Damage returned to IWA Mid-South in October to join Deranged to compete in the 2008 Double Death Tag Team Tournament. The team was accompanied to the ring by Halfbreed Billy Gram, and even though they were still billed as Vulgar Display of Power, they were openly representing Cult Fiction. After defeating The Tough Crazy Bastards (Toby Klein and Necro Butcher), Corporal Robinson and Tracy Smothers, and Dysfunction and Danny Havoc en route to the final, they defeated Drake Younger and Devon Moore to win the tournament for the second year in a row.

=== Combat Zone Wrestling ===
Damage began competing for Combat Zone Wrestling (CZW) in 2005, appearing at their Tournament of Death IV show on July 30 in New Castle, Delaware. In his first round match, he defeated Beef Wellington in a two out of three falls tables match after winning the third fall by powerbombing Wellington through a "Light Tube Table". He lost his second round match to Necro Butcher, however, in a fans bring the weapons match, where the fans at the show provided the weapons used during the match. In 2006, Damage participated in the Tournament of Death V, defeating Necro Butcher and Toby Klein in a Fans Bring The Weapons Deathmatch, by eliminating Klein to eliminate him from the tournament. He won a four-way Barbed Wire and Panes of Glass Deathmatch in the second round but was defeated by Nick Gage in the final.

Damage began competing full-time for CZW in 2007, competing mainly in singles competition. On April 7, at Out With the Old, In With the New, Damage defeated Danny Havoc, before Drake Younger at Restore the Order in May to win the CZW Ultraviolent Underground Championship. After the match, he quickly established himself as a villainous character by joining Maven Bentley's faction, also including Mitch Ryder and D. J. Hyde, and being involved in a scripted altercation with Lobo. Damage also competed at Tournament of Death VI, but lost to Drake Younger in the final. Damage defended the Ultraviolent Underground Championship against Younger at Dishonorable Conduct in August, however, the match ended in a double pin, so the owner of CZW, Zandig vacated the championship. At TOD: Fast Forward, Damage won a four-way elimination match to win the vacant championship. Damage also competed at Cage of Death 9, but was eliminated from the Cage of Death match.

On January 12, 2008, Damage defeated Joker in a 20-minute Iron Man Home Run Derby Deathmatch in overtime, to retain the Ultraviolent Underground Championship and win the CZW Iron Man Championship. At the following CZW show, 9 F'N Years, Damage lost the Ultraviolent Underground Championship back to Younger, although he still remained the Iron Man Champion. He dropped the Iron Man Championship to D. J. Hyde at Summer School in a four-way match, which also involved Danny Havoc and Insane Lane. The following month, on July 12, Damage defeated Hyde to win back the championship. In September 2008 Halfbreed Billy Gram began appearing with Brain Damage in CZW, and Brain Damage began openly representing Cult Fiction in CZW. Damage defended the championship over the following months, defeating opponents including Hyde, Cobein, before competing in the Cage of Death match at Cage of Death 10: Ultraviolent Anniversary, which was won by Zandig.

At the start of 2009, Damage began teaming with Deranged again, they were accompanied by Halfbreed Billy Gram, and both Damage and Deranged dropped the VDOP moniker and were simply known as Cult Fiction. On February 14, at Decade of Destruction – 10th Anniversary, Damage lost the Iron Man Championship to Sami Callihan.

=== Other promotions ===
In 2004, Damage began competing for the Independent Wrestling Revolution promotion in Detroit, Michigan, and on March 21, at IWR Brawl At The Hall 3, he unsuccessfully challenged Deranged for the XICW Xtreme Championship in a match also involving Necro Butcher, The DBA and George Morbid. In 2006, he wrestled at IWA East Coast's The Evil That Men Do on August 2, but was defeated by Bull Pain.

Brain Damage made his one and only appearance for CHIKARA Pro's "King of Trios" tournament in 2009, where he teamed with Necro Butcher and Toby Klein. Together, they were known as "The Death Match Kings". They lost in the first round of the tournament to Team F.I.S.T. (Icarus, Gran Akuma, & Chuck Taylor).

== Death ==
Lambert was found dead on October 18, 2012. His death is believed to be a suicide.

== Championships and accomplishments ==
- Combat Zone Wrestling
  - CZW Iron Man Championship (2 times)
  - CZW Ultraviolent Underground Championship (2 times)
  - CZW Tournament of Death: Fast Forward
- Independent Wrestling Association Mid-South
  - IWA Mid-South Tag Team Championship (1 time) – with Deranged
  - Double Death Tag Team Deathmatch (2007, 2008) – with Deranged
- Pro Wrestling Illustrated
  - PWI ranked him #470 of the top 500 wrestlers in the PWI 500 in 2011
- Xtreme Intense Championship Wrestling
  - XICW Tag Team Championship (1 time) – with Toby Klein

== See also ==
- List of premature professional wrestling deaths
