= The Messiah (wrestler) =

American professional wrestler (born 1977)

Personal information
- Born: William C. Welch; December 18, 1977 (age 48) Detroit, Michigan, U.S.

Professional wrestling career
- Ring name(s): Iron Mike Ehrhardt; The Blunatic; The Messiah
- Billed height: 6 ft 1 in (1.85 m)
- Billed weight: 210 lb (95 kg)
- Trained by: Carlito Montana; Slam U Wrestling Gym; Dynamite D
- Debut: November 11, 1996
- Retired: 2013

William C. Welch (born December 18, 1977) is an American professional wrestler, better known by his ring name The Messiah.

== Professional wrestling career ==
Welch's professional career began on November 11, 1996, after being trained at the Slam U. Wrestling Gym in Sun Valley, Los Angeles, California. He worked for the school's parent company, the Slammers Wrestling Federation for a time, losing his first professional match there to El Sprito. In the Slammers Wrestling Federation, he worked under the name Iron Mike Ehrhardt.

=== Xtreme Pro Wrestling (1999–2001) ===
On November 20, 1999, Welch made his Xtreme Pro Wrestling debut under a mask as The Blunatic, where he lost to Nicole Bass. The following week, The Blunatic teamed with Felony to face Bass in a handicap match, but was again defeated. On December 17, Welch debuted his new ring name The Messiah, a holy man gimmick, where he defeated Johnny Webb. The Messiah soon rose up the card and eventually became a main eventer while wrestling against Extreme Championship Wrestling alumni such as Sabu, Chris Candido and New Jack. The Messiah cemented his spot as one of XPW's main stars when he won both the World Heavyweight and the King of the Deathmatch Championships to become the company's first and only double champion.

=== Combat Zone Wrestling (2002–2006, 2007, 2010) ===
After leaving XPW due to both personal issues and an uneasy feeling over the promotion's pornographic ties, Welch made his debut in Combat Zone Wrestling on January 12, 2002, under his Messiah ring name and gimmick, where he accepted then-World Heavyweight Champion Justice Pain's open challenge. At the first Tournament of Death on August 31, Messiah competed in the tournament despite not being an official entrant. Though he managed to defeat Adam Flash in the first round, Messiah lost to Nick Mondo in the semi-finals. Despite the loss, Messiah defeated Flash to win the Iron Man Championship on October 12 before later defeating Justice Pain for the World Heavyweight Championship on December 14. After losing the Iron Man Title to Nick Mondo on February 8, 2003, Messiah later lost the World Heavyweight Title to Zandig on October 25. Messiah would go on to win the World Heavyweight Title two more times before leaving the company in December 2006.

One year later, Messiah made a one-night return to compete for the World Heavyweight Title against defending champion Ruckus and Nick Gage, the latter of whom won the match and the title. On July 10, 2010, at the CZW and Jersey All Pro Wrestling co-event Acid-Fest: A Tribute to Trent Acid, Welch returned to compete as The Messiah in a 28-man battle royal, which was ultimately won by Helter Skelter.

=== Independent circuit (2006-2013) ===
After leaving CZW in 2006, Messiah wrestled three matches for Pro Wrestling Unplugged in 2007 before taking a hiatus. On July 25, 2009, Messiah returned to wrestle a match for the Alternative Wrestling Show, which he lost to Johnny Goodtime. On July 10, 2011, at the second Acid-Fest event, Messiah and Adam Flash defeated Devon Moore and Drew Blood in a tag team match. He wrestled his last match in 2013.

=== Return to CZW (2014) ===
He was set to appear at CZW Down With The Sickness 2014 event in an 8 Man Tag Team Match. Due to personal issues Messiah did not return.

=== CZW Hall Of Fame (2019) ===
On February 9, 2019, at CZW 20th Anniversary show in Voorhees, New Jersey, Welch was inducted into the CZW Hall Of Fame. He was inducted along with Adam Flash, B Boy, Lufisto, Sonjay Dutt and Trent Acid.

=== Southern California Death Match Hall Of Fame (2019) ===
On July 20, 2019, at Santino Brothers Wrestling “Don’t Get Made, Get Even” show in Huntington Park, California, Welch was the second induction into the SoCal Death Match Hall Of Fame. He was inducted along with Supreme. Both men are credited with pioneering Death Match Wrestling in California with their memorable semi main event Death Match at XPW “Go Funk Yourself” event on July 22, 2000, at the L.A. Sports Arena in Los Angeles, California.

== Other media ==
Welch, as The Messiah, is a playable character in the video game Backyard Wrestling 2: There Goes the Neighborhood.

== Personal life ==
On August 1, 2002, Welch was attacked in his home by two men and had his thumb cut off during the assault. The attempted hit made national media coverage and was featured on the September 21, 2002 episode of America's Most Wanted.

Welch married Renell Madison on October 14, 2006. He and Renell have two daughters together.

== Championships and accomplishments ==
- Combat Zone Wrestling
  - CZW Iron Man Championship (1 time)
  - CZW World Heavyweight Championship (3 times)
  - CZW Hall of Fame (2019)
- Insane Wrestling Federation
  - IWF Tag Team Championship (1 time) – with Adam Flash
- Mexican pro Wrestling
  - MEXPRO Heavyweight Championship (1 time, current)
- Millennium Pro Wrestling
  - MPW Heavyweight Championship (1 time)
- NWA Florida
  - NWA Florida King of the Deathmatch Championship (1 time)
- Pacific Championship Wrestling
  - PCW Heavyweight Championship (1 time)
- Pro Wrestling Illustrated
  - PWI ranked him #241 among the 500 best singles wrestlers of the PWI 500 in 2001
- River City Wrestling
  - RCW Tag Team Championship (1 time) – with Scott McKenzie
- Xtreme Pro Wrestling
  - XPW King of the Deathmatch Championship (1 times)
  - XPW World Heavyweight Championship (1 time)
