= Lobo (wrestler) =

American professional wrestler (born 1975)

Personal information
- Born: Joseph Eubanks; March 15, 1975 (age 51) Philadelphia, Pennsylvania, U.S.

Professional wrestling career
- Ring name(s): Lobo; Sheriff Lobo
- Billed height: 5 ft 10 in (178 cm)
- Billed weight: 235 lb (107 kg)
- Billed from: "His own personal hell"
- Trained by: John Zandig
- Debut: 1999
- Retired: 2007

Joseph Eubanks (born March 15, 1975) is an American retired professional wrestler best known by the ring name Lobo. He wrestled primarily in Combat Zone Wrestling (CZW), where he won every major championship and was the first inductee into the CZW Hall of Fame in 2004.

== Professional wrestling career ==
Along with Nick Gage, Justice Pain, and Ric Blade, Lobo was trained by John Zandig at the CZW Wrestling School and graduated first in the class. He became one of the main wrestlers in CZW along with other graduates from the school. In February 1999, Lobo became the second Iron Man Champion. He held the title until June when he lost it to Justice Pain. These two continued wrestling each other and competed in the first ever Cage of Death match at the first Cage of Death show. Lobo won the match and regained the title. He would lose this title to Wifebeater, but regain it one more time the following year.

Lobo also challenged for the CZW Heavyweight Championship. He feuded with Zandig for the title and finally beat him in July 2000. He held the title until Cage of Death II. At that show, Lobo successfully defended the championship against Zandig in the Cage of Death match. Directly following this match, Justice Pain came out and fought Lobo in another Cage of Death match. In the match, Lobo was thrown from the top of the cage to the ground through a table covered in barbed wire. Justice Pain went on to win the match and the title. After losing the title, Lobo continued feuding with Zandig. This time, the feud was for ownership of CZW. On February 9, 2002, Lobo defeated Zandig to become the new owner of CZW. He held this position until Cage of Death IV when Zandig defeated him to regain his position as CZW's owner

He took some time off from CZW following the Cage of Death match. While he was gone, a new group called the Hi-V tried to take over CZW, with Zandig as their main target. Zandig was planning to face the Hi-V at Cage of Death V, but the stable outnumbered his team 6 to 4. At Night of Infamy II, Lobo made a return to help Zandig and join his team just in time for Cage of Death. Their team was successful. In February 2004, Lobo became the first inductee to the CZW Hall of Fame. After this, Lobo remained inactive for the following two years.

At Cage of Death 7, Zandig, who had turned on the fans, wanted to run CZW the way they used to. He called out Lobo, who was backstage for the event, and they joined each other along with Justice Pain and Nick Gage. They would later call themselves the Forefathers of CZW.

== Championships and accomplishments ==
- Combat Zone Wrestling
  - CZW Interpromotional Hardcore Championship (1 time)
  - CZW Iron Man Championship (3 times)
  - CZW World Heavyweight Championship (1 time)
  - CZW World Tag Team Championship (1 time) - with T.C.K.
  - CZW Hall of Fame (2004)

== Notes ==
General

- "CZW championship reign histories". CZWrestling.com. Archived from the original on December 22, 2010.
- "Combat Zone Wrestling show archives (1999)". CZWrestling.com. Archived from the original on January 10, 2016.
- "Combat Zone Wrestling show archives (2000)". CZWrestling.com. Archived from the original on January 16, 2010.
- "Combat Zone Wrestling show archives (2001)". CZWrestling.com. Archived from the original on January 16, 2010.
- "Combat Zone Wrestling show archives (2002)". CZWrestling.com. Archived from the original on March 3, 2016.
- "Combat Zone Wrestling show archives (2003)". CZWrestling.com. Archived from the original on March 3, 2016.
- "Combat Zone Wrestling show archives (2004)". CZWrestling.com. Archived from the original on February 16, 2016.
- "Combat Zone Wrestling show archives (2005)". CZWrestling.com. Archived from the original on January 16, 2010.
- "Combat Zone Wrestling show archives (2006)". CZWrestling.com. Archived from the original on January 16, 2010.
- "Combat Zone Wrestling show archives (2007)". CZWrestling.com. Archived from the original on March 3, 2016.
- "Combat Zone Wrestling show archives (2008)". CZWrestling.com. Archived from the original on December 22, 2015.
- "Combat Zone Wrestling show archives (2009)". CZWrestling.com. Archived from the original on March 6, 2013.

Specific
