= CZW Ultraviolent Underground Championship =

Professional wrestling championship

CZW Ultraviolent Championship

Details
- Promotion: Combat Zone Wrestling (CZW)
- Date established: February 5, 2005
- Current champion: SHLAK
- Date won: March 1, 2026

Other name
- CZW Ultraviolent Underground Championship (2005 - 2012)
Statistics
- First champion: JC Bailey
- Final champion: Masada
- Most reigns: JC Bailey, Brain Damage, Danny Havoc, Drake Younger and Nick Gage (2 reigns)
- Longest reign: Danny Havoc (379 days)
- Shortest reign: Sami Callihan (<1 day)

The CZW Ultraviolent Championship is a professional hardcore wrestling championship owned by the Combat Zone Wrestling (CZW) promotion. The title was introduced on February 5, 2005, at CZW's Only the Strong event. It was original retired in 2012 after being unified with the CZW World Heavyweight Championship. In 2026, the title was reactivated. The current champion is SHLAK, who is in his first reign.

Overall, there have been 18 reigns shared among 12 wrestlers. Title reigns are determined either by professional wrestling matches between wrestlers involved in pre-existing scripted feuds and storylines, or by scripted circumstances. Wrestlers are portrayed as either villains or heroes as they follow a series of tension-building events, which culminate in a wrestling match or series of matches for the championship. Title changes happen mostly at CZW-promoted events, which are usually released on DVD. The inaugural champion was JC Bailey, who defeated Necro Butcher in a Backstage Ultraviolent Underground Barbed Wire Cage of Death Light Tubes Scaffold Death match on February 5, 2005, at CZW's Only the Strong event. Bailey, Brain Damage, Nick Gage, Danny Havoc and Drake Younger are all tied for the record of most reigns, with 2 each. At 379 days, Danny Havoc's first reign is the longest in the title's history. Younger's combined 2 reigns hold the record for most days as champion at 454. Sami Callihan's only reign holds the record for shortest reign at less than one day.

== Title history ==
Key
No.	Overall reign number
Reign	Reign number for the specific champion
Days	Number of days held

No.	Champion	Championship change			Reign statistics		Notes	Ref.
No.	Champion	Date	Event	Location	Reign	Days	Notes	Ref.
1	J. C. Bailey	February 5, 2005	Only the Strong	Philadelphia, Pennsylvania	1	(Note: The exact date in July 2005 on which JC Bailey was defeated by Zandig to win the championship during his first reign is unknown, which means that his reign lasted between 146 and 175 days.)	JC Bailey defeated Necro Butcher in a Backstage Ultraviolent Underground Barbed Wire Cage of Death Light Tubes Scaffold Death Match to become the first champion.	
2	Zandig	July 2005	Live event	The Junkyard	1	(Note: The exact date in July 2005 on which Zandig defeated JC Bailey to win the championship during his first reign is unknown, which means that his reign lasted between 0 and 29 days.)		
3	Necro Butcher	July 30, 2005	Tournament of Death IV	New Castle, Delaware	1	14	Necro Butcher defeated Zandig and Nick Gage in a Ultraviolent Boxes, Barbed Wire Canvas, Light Tubes, Squared Circle Of Fear, & Whatever The Fuck Is Left Elimination Death Match.	
4	J. C. Bailey	August 13, 2005	Deja Vu 3	Philadelphia, Pennsylvania	2	154	Defeated Necro Butcher in a No Rope Barbed Wire, Barbed Wire Board, Barbed Wire Table & Barbed Wire Chair Match	
5	Nick Gage	January 14, 2006	An Afternoon of Main Events	Philadelphia, Pennsylvania	1	274	Defeated J.C. Bailey and Necro Butcher in a three-way elimination No Rope Barbed Wire Match.	
6	Drake Younger	October 15, 2006	Fear	Middletown, Delaware	1	209	This was a No Ropes Barbed Wire Match	
7	Brain Damage	May 12, 2007	Restore the Order	Philadelphia, Pennsylvania	1	91	This was a Barbed Wire Ropes, Barbed Wire Board, Pane of Glass & Ladder Match	
—	Vacated	August 11, 2007	Dishonorable Conduct	Philadelphia, Pennsylvania	—	—	The title was vacated due to a double pinfall during a match between Brain Damage and Drake Younger.	
8	Brain Damage	September 15, 2007	Tournament of Death: Fast Forward	Smyrna, Delaware	2	147	Damage defeated JC Bailey, Danny Havoc, and Scotty Vortekz in a Four Corners Elimination 200 Lighttubes Death match to win the vacant championship.	
9	Drake Younger	February 9, 2008	9 F'N Years	Philadelphia, Pennsylvania	2	245	This was a Barbed Wire Boards & Panes of Glass Match	
10	Danny Havoc	October 11, 2008	Decision 2008	Philadelphia, Pennsylvania	1	379	Havoc was awarded the championship by Younger.	
11	Sami Callihan	October 25, 2009	Tournament of Death: Rewind	Townsend, Delaware	1	0	This was a Caribbean Pits of Death Deathmatch.	
12	Thumbtack Jack	October 25, 2009	Tournament of Death: Rewind	Townsend, Delaware	1	84	This was a Transylvania Death Match	
13	Adam Polak	January 17, 2010	18+ Underground: Chapter Two	Oberhausen, Germany	1	294	This was a Death Match	
14	Nick Gage	November 7, 2010	Tournament of Death vs. Gorefest	Oberhausen, Germany	2	34	This was a Polish Punishment Death Match	
15	Yuko Miyamoto	December 11, 2010	Cage of Death XII	Philadelphia, Pennsylvania	1	101		
16	Jun Kasai	March 22, 2011	FREEDOMS	Tokyo, Japan	1	18	This was a Glass Deathmatch	
17	Danny Havoc	April 9, 2011	Best of the Best X	Philadelphia, Pennsylvania	2	91	This was a Ragnarok and Roll Glass Crush Death Match	
18	Masada	July 9, 2011	New Heights	Philadelphia, Pennsylvania	1	315	This was a Gusset Plate Deathmatch	
—	Deactivated	May 19, 2012	—	—	—	—	Title was unified with the CZW World Heavyweight Championship.	
19	SHLAK	March 1, 2026	CZW 27th Anniversary: Deej And Ricks Ultraviolent Adventure	Trenton, New Jersey	1	153+	SHLAK defeated Eric Ryan, Hoodfoot, Jimmy Lloyd, Lucky 13 and Nick Gage a 6-way ultraviolent scramble match to win the vacant championship.	

== Combined reigns ==
Rank	Wrestler	No. of reigns	Combined days
1	Danny Havoc	2	470
2	Drake Younger	2	454
3	Masada	1	315
4	Nick Gage	2	308
5	JC Bailey¤	2	300
6	Adam Polak	1	294
7	Brain Damage	2	238
8	Yuko Miyamoto	1	101
9	Thumbtack Jack	1	84
10	SHLAK †	1	153+
11	Jun Kasai	1	18
12	Necro Butcher	1	14
13	Sami Callihan	1	<1
14	Zandig¤	1	0
