= D. J. Hyde =

American professional wrestler

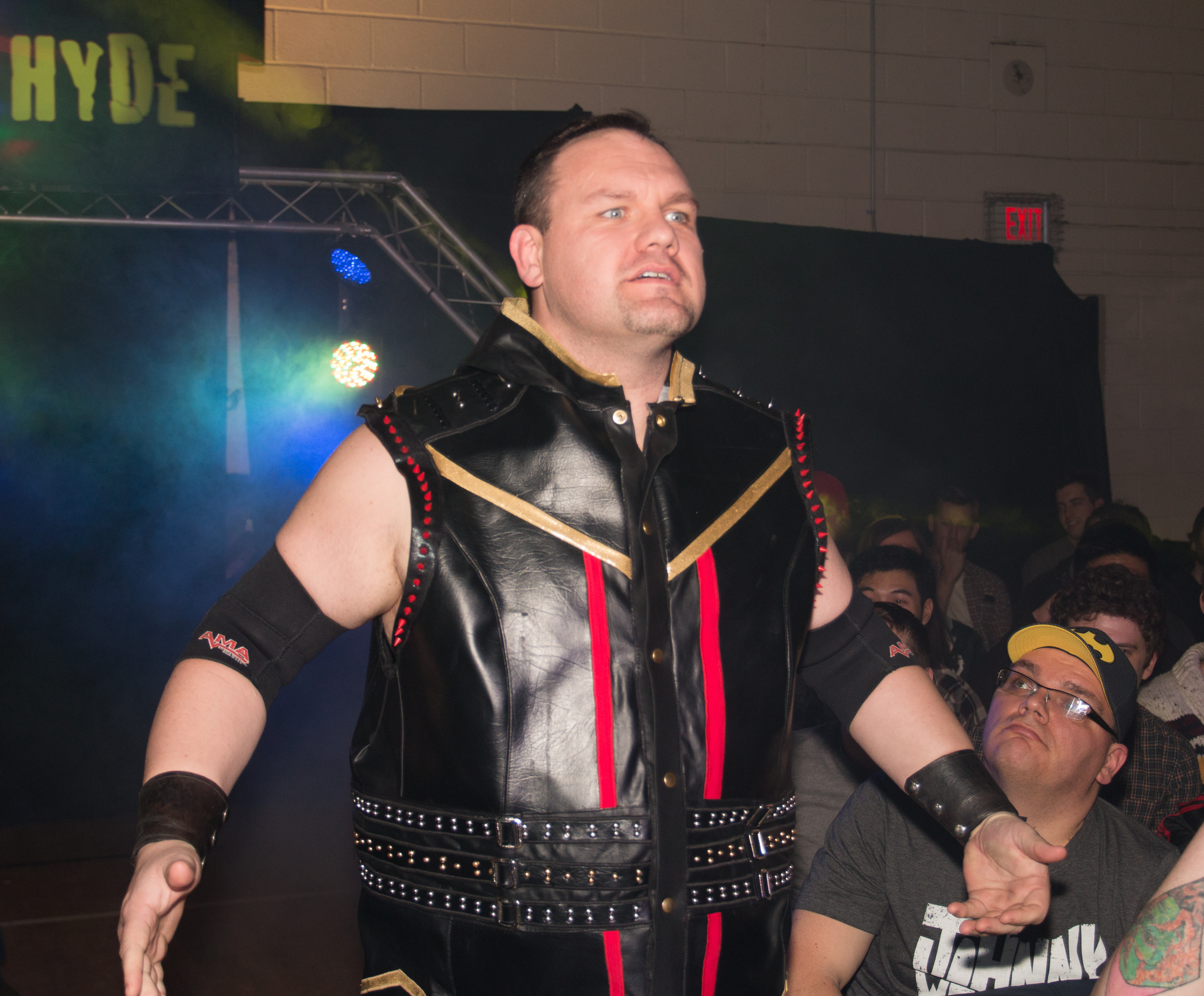
- Hyde in 2016

Personal information
- Born: David John Markland; March 1, 1978 (age 48) Newark, Delaware, United States

Professional wrestling career
- Ring name(s): D. J. Hyde; Deej; Mano Metalico
- Billed height: 6 ft 4 in (193 cm)
- Billed weight: 300 lb (136 kg)
- Trained by: Combat Zone Wrestling; Jon Dahmer
- Debut: September 13, 2003

David John Markland (born March 1, 1978) is an American professional wrestler and promoter, better known as D. J. Hyde.

== Professional wrestling ==
D. J. Hyde is the owner of Combat Zone Wrestling (CZW). Hyde purchased the promotion from its original owner, Zandig, in 2009. As a CZW competitor, he is a three-time CZW Iron Man Champion. In December 2012, D.J. Hyde faced "The Bulldozer" Matt Tremont in the main event of Cage of Death. Since 2013, he is also part owner of the all-woman Women Superstars Uncensored wrestling promotion. In addition, D. J. Hyde has traveled the world to compete for several independent promotions, including Big Japan Pro Wrestling and the East Coast Wrestling Association (ECWA), where he serves as the Commissioner of ECWA. Hyde has also appeared in such companies such as, Chikara, Westside Xtreme Wrestling, Jersey All Pro Wrestling, Fight Club Pro, Heartland Wrestling Association, IWA Mid South, Maryland Championship Wrestling, Championship Wrestling from Hollywood, and Dragon Gate USA, Pro Wrestling Empire, and Legacy Pro Wrestling.

== Personal life ==
Hyde was an All-American football player at Middletown High School in Middletown, Delaware. His football skills awarded him a scholarship at Penn State University, but he later tore several ligaments in his right knee, ending up in a wheelchair for 19 months.

=== Harassment allegations ===
Hyde was accused of sexual harassment during the Speaking Out movement, Kimber Lee claimed he told female wrestlers he "would only book women he'd have sex with", which was corroborated by Nyla Rose. Chrissy Rivera and Shelly Martinez also accused Hyde of making misogynistic comments towards female wrestlers. LuFisto claimed that CZW sold DVDs of female wrestlers marketed as softcore pornography without their consent.

== Championships and accomplishments ==
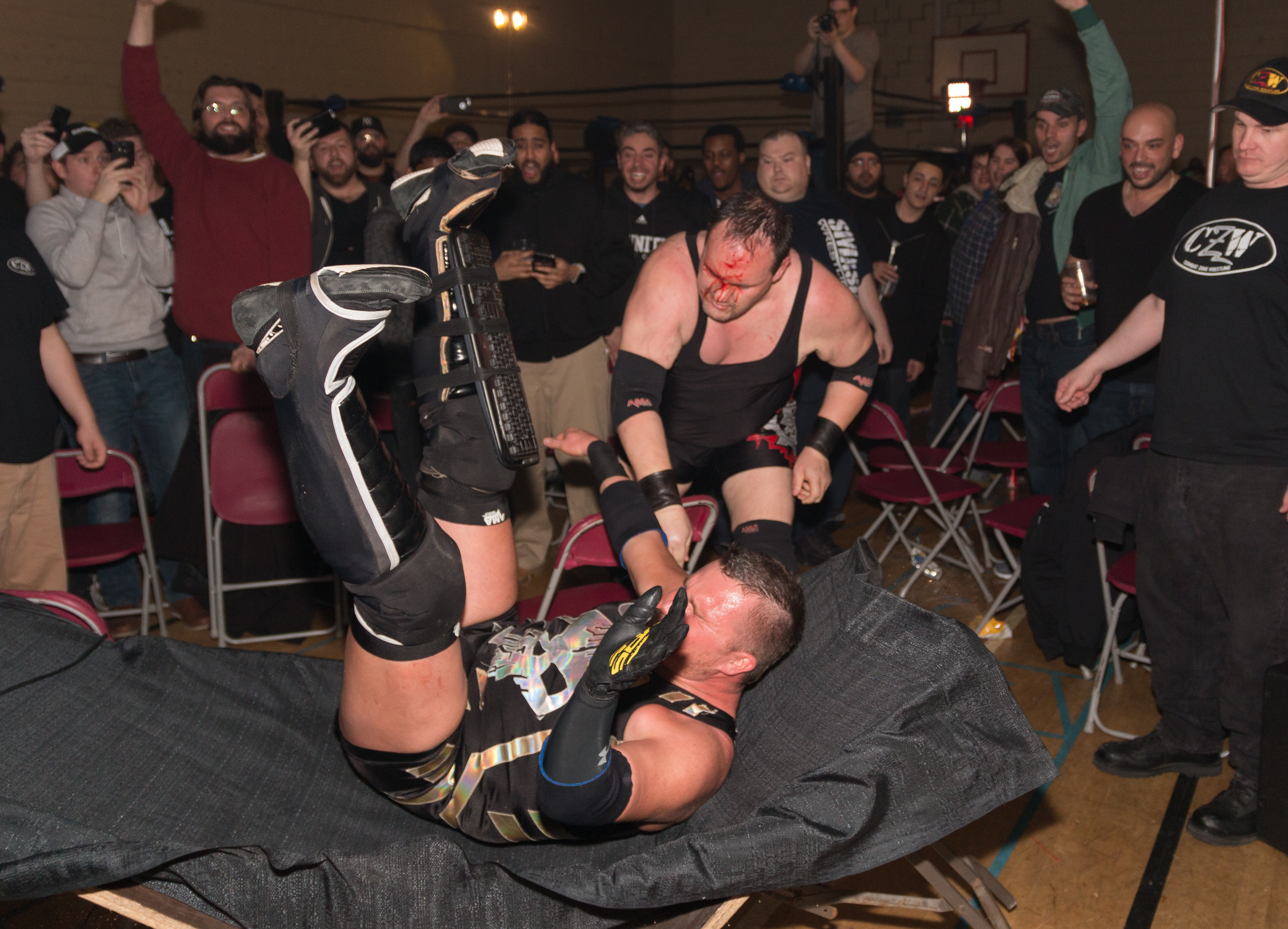
D. J. Hyde chokeslamming "Hacker" Scotty O'Shea through a table at a Smash Wrestling event in Etobicoke, ON

- Combat Zone Wrestling
  - CZW Iron Man Championship (3 times)
  - Tournament of Death (8)
  - CZW Hall of Fame (Class of 2014)
- East Coast Wrestling Association
  - Hall of Fame (2011)
- Eastern Wrestling Association
  - EWA Heavyweight Championship (2 times)
- Maryland Championship Wrestling
  - MCW Tag Team Championship (1 time) with Dino Divine
- Maven Bentley Association
  MBA Heavyweight Championship (1 time)
- Pro Wrestling Illustrated
  - PWI ranked him #268 of the top 500 singles wrestlers in the PWI 500 in 2013
- Rockstar Pro Wrestling
  - Rockstar Pro Championship (1 time)

== Media ==
- The Wrestler
- Vice Canada Reports: "Bloodlust: Tournament of Death"
