= BJW Tag Team Championship =

Professional wrestling tag team championship

- Current design of the BJW Tag Team Championship (1997 – present)

Details
- Promotion: Big Japan Pro Wrestling
- Date established: June 3, 1997
- Current champions: Kazumi Kikuta and Toru Sugiura
- Date won: December 30, 2025
Statistics
- First champions: Kengo Kimura and Takashi Ishikawa
- Most reigns: As a team:Strong BJ (Daisuke Sekimoto and Yuji Okabayashi) (5 reigns); As individual: Daisuke Sekimoto (13 reigns)
- Longest reign: Astronauts (Takuya Nomura and Fuminori Abe) (604 days)
- Shortest reign: Ryuji Ito and Badboy Hido (4 days)
- Oldest champion: Madman Pondo (55 years, 325 days)

The BJW Tag Team Championship (BJW認定タッグ王座, BJW nintei taggu ōza) is the top tag team title defended in the Japanese professional wrestling promotion Big Japan Pro Wrestling. The championship has been the leading tag team championship in the promotion since 1997. There have been a total of 66 reigns shared between 49 different teams consisting of 59 distinctive champions. The current champions are Kazumi Kikuta and Toru Sugiura who are in their first reign as a team.

== Title history ==
The title was created on June 3, 1997, when Takashi Ishikawa and Kengo Kimura defeated Shoji Nakamaki and Takashi Okano in the finals of a five-team scramble tournament to become the first champions. The championship has been the leading tag team championship in the promotion since 1997. The title matches are done with normal rules, but they also can be done by deathmatches. Like most professional wrestling championships, the title is won via the result of a scripted match. Title changes usually happen at BJW-promoted events; although the title has only changed hands twice at a non-BJW event, it has been defended in several other promotions like Combat Zone Wrestling and Fuyuki Army.

Key
No.	Overall reign number
Reign	Reign number for the specific team—reign numbers for the individuals are in parentheses, if different
Days	Number of days held
Defenses	Number of successful defenses
+	Current reign is changing daily

No.	Champion	Championship change			Reign statistics			Notes	Ref.
No.	Champion	Date	Event	Location	Reign	Days	Defenses	Notes	Ref.
1	Kengo Kimura and Takashi Ishikawa	June 3, 1997	Big Japan Fighter Declaration 1997: Touha	Tokyo, Japan	1	8	0	Defeated the teams of Jado & Gedo, Kendo Nagasaki and Satoru Shiga, Shoji Nakamaki and Takashi Okano and Yoshihiro Tajiri and Yuichi Taniguchi in a 5-way Elimination match to become the inaugural champions.	
—	Vacated	June 11, 1997	—	—	—	—	—	Vacated when Ishikawa and Kimura split up.	
2	Yoshihiro Tajiri and Ryuji Yamakawa	July 23, 1997	Big Japan Fighter Declaration 1997: Toushi	Tokyo, Japan	1	152	3	Defeated Takashi Ishikawa and Kishin Kawabata to win the vacant title.	
3	Jado and Gedo	December 22, 1997	Fuyuki Army house show	Isesaki, Japan	1	11	0		
4	Yoshihiro Tajiri (2) and Ryuji Yamakawa (2)	January 2, 1998	Big Japan Fighter Declaration 1998: Toshinden	Tokyo, Japan	2	61	0		
5	Shadows (Shadow WX and Shadow Winger)	March 4, 1998	Big Japan Fighter Declaration 1998: Toushou	Shimizu, Japan	1	158	4		
6	Shoji Nakamaki and Ryuji Yamakawa (3)	August 9, 1998	Big Japan Fighter Declaration 1998: Toushi	Kawasaki, Japan	1	112	2		
—	Vacated	November 29, 1998	—	—	—	—	—	Vacated when Nakamaki left the promotion.	
7	Shadow WX (2) and Tomoaki Honma	December 5, 1998	HWO 4 Year	Yokohama, Japan	1	238	3	Defeated Jason the Terrible and The Winger in a Light Tubes Board deathmatch to win the vacant title.	
8	Ryuji Yamakawa (4) and Mike Samples	July 31, 1999	House show	Hakata, Japan	1	38	0		
9	Kamikaze and Shunme Matsuzaki	September 7, 1999	House show	Imabari, Japan	1	122	3		
10	Ryuji Yamakawa (5) and Tomoaki Honma (2)	January 7, 2000	BJ Great Series 2000	Osaka, Japan	1	147	0		
11	Zandig and Nick Gage	June 2, 2000	BJ Hardcore Series 2000	Nagaoka, Japan	1	8	0		
12	Wifebeater and Justice Pain	June 10, 2000	CZW Caged To The End	Sewell, New Jersey	1	22	0		
13	Shadow WX (3) and Ryuji Yamakawa (6)	July 2, 2000	BJ Hardcore Series II 2000	Tokyo, Japan	1	75	3		
14	Kamikaze (2) and Abdullah Kobayashi	September 15, 2000	Maximum Tag League 2000	Tokyo, Japan	1	135	2	This was a Light Tubes Board deathmatch.	
15	Men's Club (Men's Teioh and Daisuke Sekimoto)	January 28, 2001	New Year Great Series 2001	Tokyo, Japan	1	595	9		
16	Skinheaders (Daikokubo Benkei and Abdullah Kobayashi (2))	September 15, 2002	BJ Monster 2002	Hakata, Japan	1	460	1		
17	Ryuji Ito and Badboy Hido	December 19, 2003	HTH Series 2003 - Day 2	Tokyo, Japan	1	4	0	This was a Cage deathmatch.	
18	Men's Teioh (2) and Mr. Big Japan (7)	December 23, 2003	HTH Series 2003 - Day 3	Nagoya, Japan	1	236	1	Mr. Big Japan previously won the title under the name Ryuji Yamakawa.	
19	Skinheaders (Abdullah Kobayashi (3) and "Black Angel" Jaki Numazawa)	August 15, 2004	Road To Decade	Kawasaki, Japan	1	105	0	This was a Barbed Wire Board deathmatch.	
20	Akarangers (Takashi Sasaki and Gentaro)	November 28, 2004	House show	Chiba, Japan	1	289	1		
—	Vacated	September 13, 2005	—	—	—	—	—	Vacated due to a lack of title defenses.	
21	Abdullah Kobayashi (4) and Daisuke Sekimoto (2)	October 14, 2005	Maximum Tag Day	Tokyo, Japan	1	105	1	Defeated Jun Kasai and "Black Angel" Jaki Numazawa in a Fluorescent Light Tubes deathmatch to win the vacant title.	
22	Team Anko-gata (Shadow WX (4) and Mammoth Sasaki)	January 27, 2006	House show	Kawasaki, Japan	1	310	4		
23	Daisuke Sekimoto (3) and Yoshihito Sasaki	December 3, 2006	House show	Yokohama, Japan	1	455	6		
24	Kengo Mashimo and Madoka	March 2, 2008	ZERO-ONE 7th Anniversary	Tokyo, Japan	1	133	1		
25	Mammoth Sasaki (2) and Daisuke Sekimoto (4)	July 13, 2008	House show	Yokohama, Japan	1	237	6		
—	Vacated	March 7, 2009	—	—	—	—	—	Vacated after Sasaki suffered an injury in an automobile accident.	
26	Masashi Takeda and Isami Kodaka	May 28, 2009	House show	Tokyo, Japan	1	60	0	Defeated Takashi Sasaki and Yuko Miyamoto in a tournament final Fluorescent Light Tubes Tower deathmatch to win the vacant title.	
27	Strong BJ (Daisuke Sekimoto (5) and Yuji Okabayashi)	July 27, 2009	House show	Tokyo, Japan	1	139	2		
28	Yoshihito Sasaki (2) and Shinya Ishikawa	December 13, 2009	Fantastic Tour 2009	Hakata, Japan	1	31	0		
—	Vacated	January 13, 2010	—	—	—	—	—	Vacated after Ishikawa suffered a leg injury.	
29	045 Junkie's (Jun Kasai and "Black Angel" Jaki Numazawa (2))	April 28, 2010	BJW 15th Anniversary Death Tour	Tokyo, Japan	1	165	2	Defeated Daisuke Sekimoto and Yoshihito Sasaki in a tournament final Hardcore match to win the vacant title.	
30	Daisuke Sekimoto (6) and Yoshihito Sasaki (3)	October 10, 2010	BJ Spikeout	Sapporo, Japan	2	43	0	This was a Hardcore match.	
31	045 Junkie's (Jun Kasai (2) and "Black Angel" Jaki Numazawa (3))	November 22, 2010	House show	Tokyo, Japan	2	69	0	This was a Barbed Wire Execution deathmatch.	
32	The Brahman Brothers (Brahman Kei and Brahman Shu)	January 30, 2011	Pro-Wrestling Big Thanksgiving Death Market 3	Nagoya, Japan	1	13	0	This was a Fluorescent Light Tubes Ladder deathmatch.	
33	045 Junkie's (Jun Kasai (3) and "Black Angel" Jaki Numazawa (4))	February 12, 2011	House show	Tokyo, Japan	3	82	0	This was a Fluorescent Light Tubes, Ladder & Free Weapons deathmatch.	
34	Yankee Nichōkenjū (Yuko Miyamoto and Isami Kodaka (2))	May 5, 2011	Endless Survivor	Yokohama, Japan	1	332	4	This was a Cage, Ladder & Barbed Wire deathmatch.	
35	Yoshihito Sasaki (4) and Shinobu	April 1, 2012	Beyond The Frontiers	Sapporo, Japan	1	33	0		
36	Shuji Ishikawa and Shigehiro Irie	May 4, 2012	Union Pro Golden Union 2012	Tokyo, Japan	1	72	1		
37	Yuji Okabayashi (2) and Shinobu (2)	July 15, 2012	Ryuji Yamakawa The Final	Sapporo, Japan	1	132	2		
38	Yankee Nichōkenjū (Yuko Miyamoto (2) and Isami Kodaka (3))	November 24, 2012	House show	Tokyo, Japan	2	553	17	This was the Big Japan Tag League 2012 final Light Tubes & Barbed Wire Board deathmatch.	
39	Twin Towers (Kohei Sato and Shuji Ishikawa (2))	May 31, 2014	House show	Tokyo, Japan	1	516	7		
40	Strong BJ (Daisuke Sekimoto (7) and Yuji Okabayashi (3))	October 29, 2015	Saikyo Tag League 2015	Tokyo, Japan	2	62	0	This was the Saikyo Tag League 2015 final.	
41	Hamakami (Ryota Hama and Hideyoshi Kamitani)	December 30, 2015	House show	Tokyo, Japan	1	152	0		
42	Twin Towers (Kohei Sato (2) and Shuji Ishikawa (3))	May 30, 2016	House show	Tokyo, Japan	2	217	3		
43	Strong BJ (Daisuke Sekimoto (8) and Yuji Okabayashi (4))	January 2, 2017	House show	Tokyo, Japan	3	196	4		
44	Abdullah Kobayashi (5) and Ryuji Ito (2)	July 17, 2017	Ryōgokutan 2017	Tokyo, Japan	1	192	3		
45	Crazy Lovers (Masashi Takeda (2) and Takumi Tsukamoto)	January 25, 2018	House show	Tokyo, Japan	1	70	1	This was a Light Tubes & Five Nail Board deathmatch.	
46	Yankee Nichōkenjū (Yuko Miyamoto (3) and Isami Kodaka (4))	April 5, 2018	Ikkitousen Strong Climb 2018	Tokyo, Japan	3	107	3	This was a Death Games Over The Wall Light Tubes, Wall Of Light Tubes & Alpha Death.	
—	Vacated	July 21, 2018	—	—	—	—	—	Vacated after Miyamoto and Kodaka defended against Crazy Lovers in Osaka because Miyamoto forgot to bring his title belt to the match.	
47	Ryota Hama (2) and Yasufumi Nakanoue	October 25, 2018	Saikyo Tag League 2018	Tokyo, Japan	1	269	5	Defeated Daichi Hashimoto and Hideyoshi Kamitani in the Saikyo Tag League 2018 final to win the vacant title.	
48	Daisuke Sekimoto (9) and The Bodyguard	July 21, 2019	Osaka Surprise 42	Osaka, Japan	1	134	1		
—	Vacated	December 2, 2019	—	—	—	—	—	Vacated after The Bodyguard suffered an injury.	
49	Daisuke Sekimoto (10) and Kohei Sato (3)	December 18, 2019	Big Japan Pro Wrestling 25th Anniversary Memorial	Yokohama, Japan	1	236	3	Defeated Kazumi Kikuta and Ryuichi Kawakami to win the vacant title.	
50	Astronauts (Fuminori Abe and Takuya Nomura)	August 10, 2020	House show	Tokyo, Japan	1	174	5		
51	Kazumi Kikuta and Ryuichi Kawakami	January 31, 2021	Death Market 59	Nagoya, Japan	1	23	0		
52	Astronauts (Fuminori Abe and Takuya Nomura)	February 23, 2021	House show	Tokyo, Japan	2	173	2		
53	Okami (Daichi Hashimoto and Hideyoshi Kamitani (2))	August 15, 2021	Fukubukuro Performance ~ Dainichi Xeku	Tokyo, Japan	1	62	2		
54	Strong BJ (Daisuke Sekimoto (11) and Yuji Okabayashi (5))	October 16, 2021	Pissari Festival - Okyaku Night Fever!!	Nankoku, Japan	4	9	0		
55	Okami (Daichi Hashimoto (2) and Hideyoshi Kamitani (3))	October 25, 2021	House show	Tokyo, Japan	2	8	0		
56	Strong BJ (Daisuke Sekimoto (12) and Yuji Okabayashi (6))	November 2, 2021	House show	Hiroshima, Japan	5	124	2		
57	Okami (Daichi Hashimoto (3) and Hideyoshi Kamitani (4))	March 6, 2022	House show	Tokyo, Japan	3	60	2		
58	Astronauts (Fuminori Abe and Takuya Nomura)	May 5, 2022	BJW Big Japan Welcome Back	Yokohama, Japan	3	604	11		
59	Crazy Lovers (Masashi Takeda (3) and Takumi Tsukamoto (2))	December 30, 2023	BJW	Tokyo, Japan	2	162	2		
60	Hideyoshi Kamitani (5) and Isami Kodaka (5)	June 9, 2024	BJW	Tokyo, Japan	1	64	1	This was a crazy scattered deathmatch.	
61	Masaya Takahashi and Sagat	August 12, 2024	BJW	Tokyo, Japan	1	78	2	This was a Concrete Block & Giga Ladder Death Match.	
62	Baka Gaijin (Dale Patricks and Madman Pondo)	October 29, 2024	BJW	Tokyo, Japan	1	181	2	This was a Fluorescent Light Tubes Street Fight Death Match.	
63	W-Daichan (Daisuke Sekimoto (13) and So Daimonji)	April 28, 2025	BJW	Tokyo, Japan	1	17	1		
64	Baka Gaijin (Dale Patricks and Madman Pondo)	May 15, 2025	BJW	Tokyo, Japan	2	29	0		
—	Vacated	June 13, 2025	—	—	—	—	—	Vacated due to Pondo's unavoidable schedule change after returning to the United States.	
65	Kankuro Hoshino and Ryuji Ito (3)	June 22, 2025	BJW Ikkitousen Strong Climb 2025 Final	Tokyo, Japan	1	191	3	Defeated Akira and Dale Patricks in a Concrete Block Death Match to win the vacant titles.	
66	Kazumi Kikuta (2) and Toru Sugiura	December 30, 2025	BJW	Tokyo, Japan	1	287+	5	This was a Fluorescent Lighttubes Alpha Death Match.	

== Combined reigns ==
As of October 13, 2026.

†	Indicates the current champion

=== By team ===
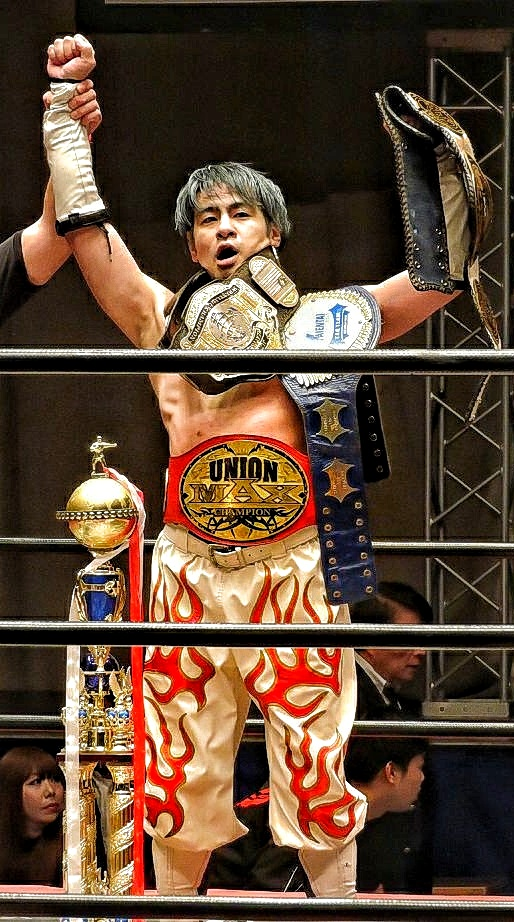
Three-time and longest combined reigning champions as team Yankee Nichōkenjū (Yuko Miyamoto and Yuji Okabayashi)
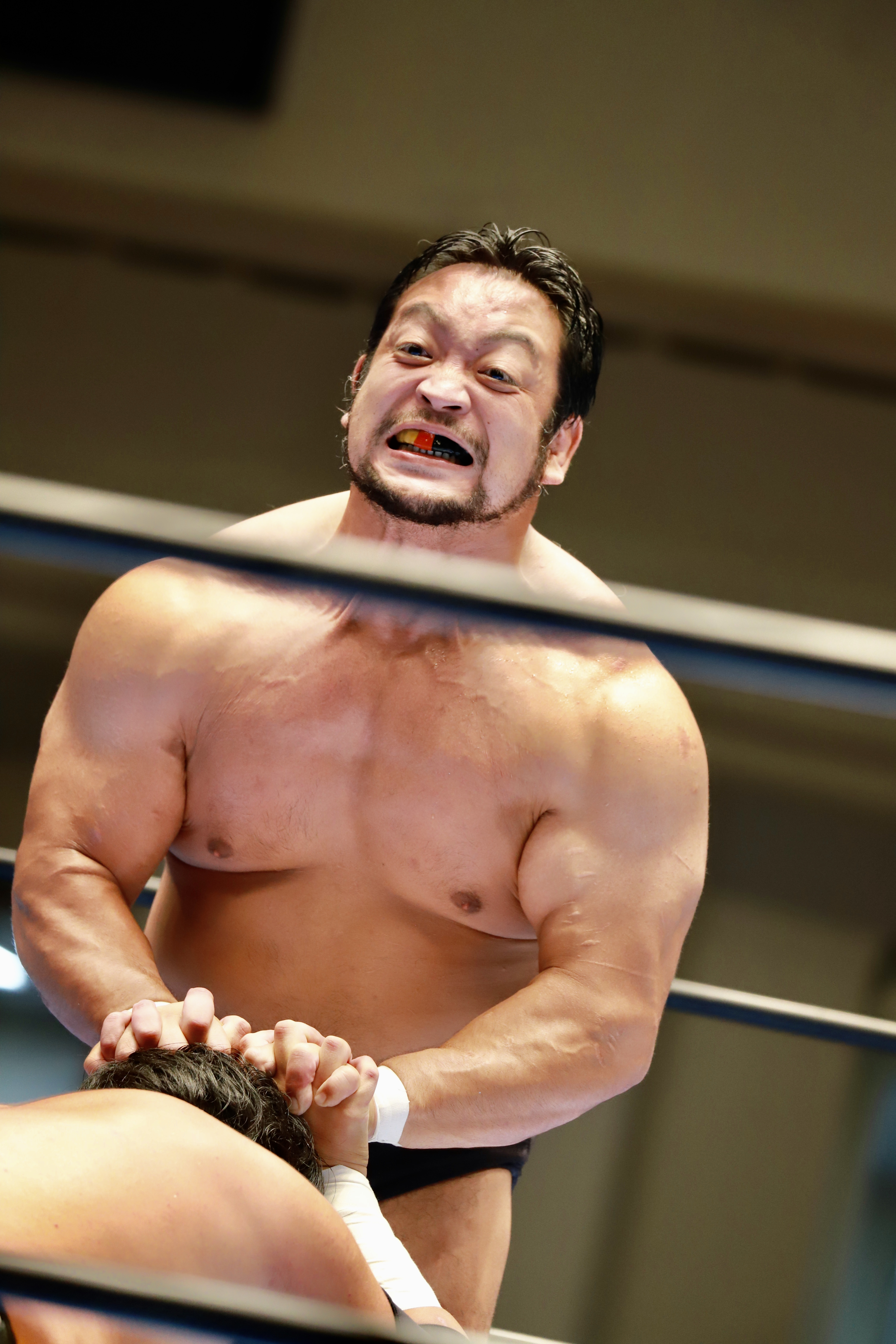
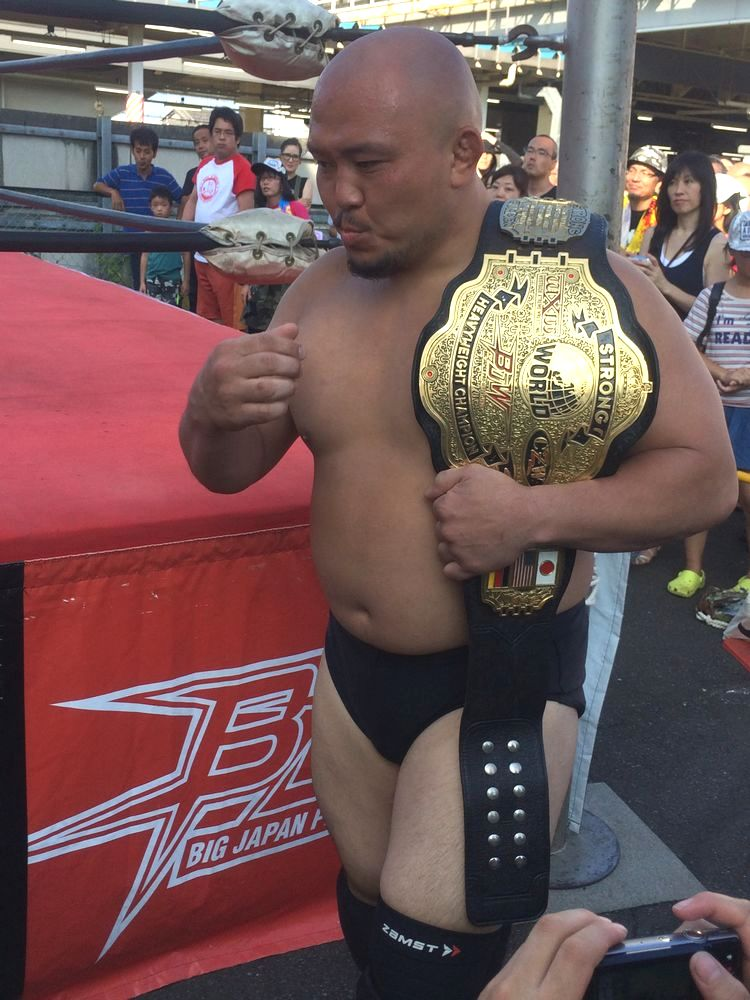
Record five-time champions as a team, Strong BJ (Daisuke Sekimoto and Yuji Okabayashi).

Rank	Team	No. of reigns	Combined defenses	Combined days
1	Yankee Nichōkenjū (Yuko Miyamoto and Isami Kodaka)	3	24	992
2	Astronauts (Fuminori Abe and Takuya Nomura)	3	18	951
3	Twin Towers (Kohei Sato and Shuji Ishikawa)	2	10	733
4	Men's Club (Men's Teioh and Daisuke Sekimoto)	1	9	595
5	Strong BJ (Daisuke Sekimoto and Yuji Okabayashi)	5	8	530
6	Daisuke Sekimoto and Yoshihito Sasaki	2	6	498
7	Skinheaders (Daikokubo Benkei and Abdullah Kobayashi)	1	1	460
8	045 Junkie's (Jun Kasai and "Black Angel" Jaki Numazawa)	3	2	316
9	Team Anko-gata (Shadow WX and Mammoth Sasaki)	1	4	310
10	Akarangers (Takashi Sasaki and Gentaro)	1	1	289
11	Kazumi Kikuta and Toru Sugiura †	1	5	287+
12	Ryota Hama and Yasufumi Nakanoue	1	5	269
13	Shadow WX and Tomoaki Honma	1	3	238
14	Mammoth Sasaki and Daisuke Sekimoto	1	6	237
15	Daisuke Sekimoto and Kohei Sato	1	3	236
15	Men's Teioh and Mr. Big Japan	1	1	236
17	Crazy Lovers (Masashi Takeda and Takumi Tsukamoto)	2	3	232
18	Yoshihiro Tajiri and Ryuji Yamakawa	2	3	213
19	Baka Gaijin (Dale Patricks and Madman Pondo)	2	2	210
20	Abdullah Kobayashi and Ryuji Ito	1	3	192
21	Kankuro Hoshino and Ryuji Ito	1	3	191
22	Shadows (Shadow WX and Shadow Winger)	1	4	158
23	Hamakami (Ryota Hama and Hideyoshi Kamitani)	1	0	152
24	Ryuji Yamakawa and Tomoaki Honma	1	0	147
25	Kamikaze and Abdullah Kobayashi	1	2	135
26	Daisuke Sekimoto and The Bodyguard	1	1	134
27	Kengo Mashimo and Madoka	1	1	133
28	Yuji Okabayashi and Shinobu	1	2	132
29	Okami (Daichi Hashimoto and Hideyoshi Kamitani)	3	4	130
30	Kamikaze and Shunme Matsuzaki	1	3	122
31	Shoji Nakamaki and Ryuji Yamakawa	1	2	112
32	Abdullah Kobayashi and Daisuke Sekimoto	1	1	105
32	Skinheaders (Abdullah Kobayashi and "Black Angel" Jaki Numazawa)	1	0	105
34	Masaya Takahashi and Sagat	1	2	78
35	Shadow WX and Ryuji Yamakawa	1	3	75
36	Shuji Ishikawa and Shigehiro Irie	1	1	72
37	Hideyoshi Kamitani and Isami Kodaka	1	1	64
38	Masashi Takeda and Isami Kodaka	1	0	60
39	Ryuji Yamakawa and Mike Samples	1	0	38
40	Yoshihito Sasaki and Shinobu	1	0	33
41	Yoshihito Sasaki and Shinya Ishikawa	1	0	31
42	Kazumi Kikuta and Ryuichi Kawakami	1	0	23
43	Wifebeater and Justice Pain	1	0	22
44	W-Daichan (Daisuke Sekimoto and So Daimonji)	1	1	17
45	The Brahman Brothers (Brahman Kei and Brahman Shu)	1	0	13
46	Jado Jado and Gedo Gedo	1	0	11
47	Kengo Kimura and Takashi Ishikawa	1	0	8
47	Zandig and Nick Gage	1	0	8
49	Ryuji Ito and Badboy Hido	1	0	4

=== By wrestler ===
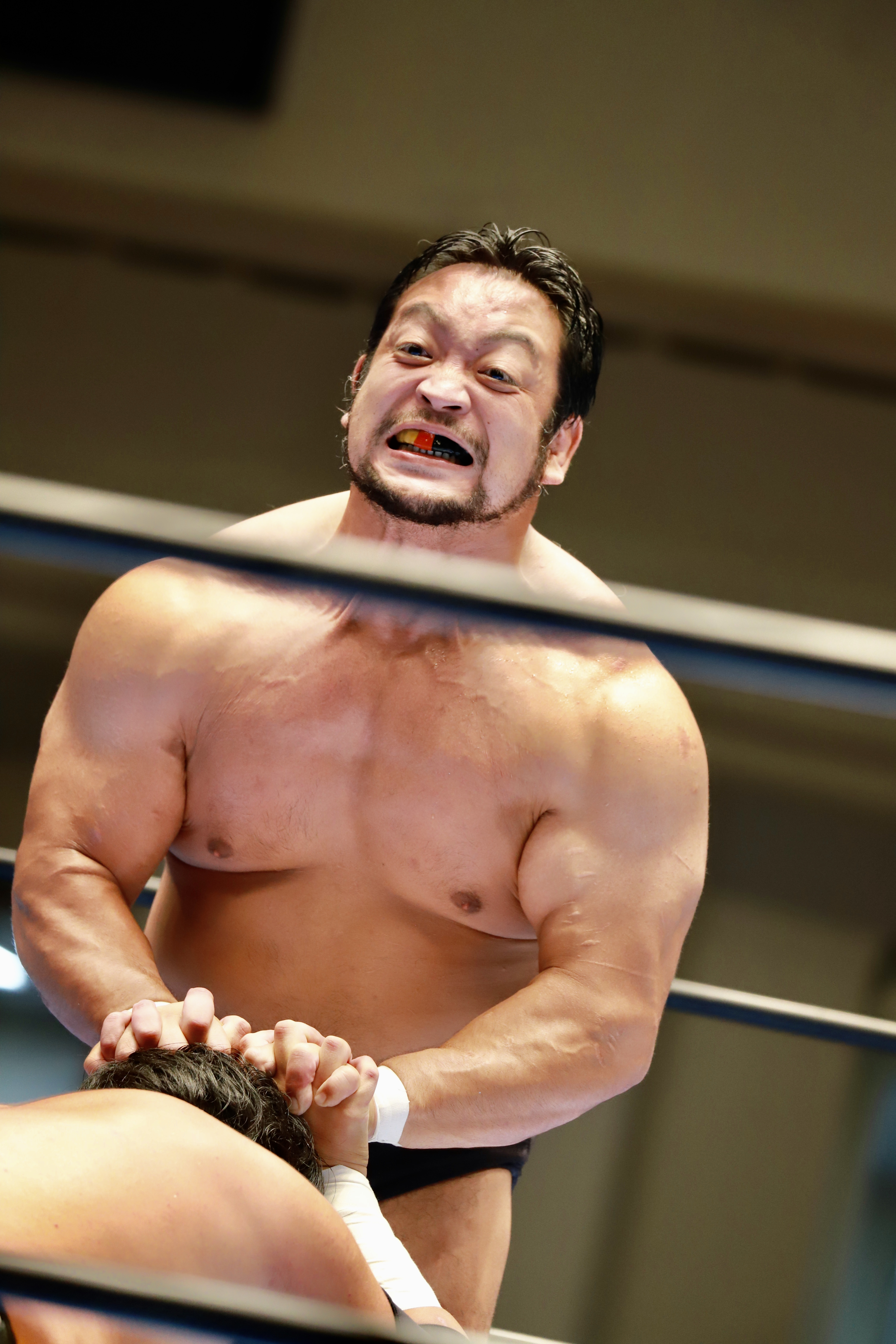
Record thirteen-time champion as individual Daisuke Sekimoto

Rank	Wrestler	No. of reigns	Combined defenses	Combined days
1	Daisuke Sekimoto	13	35	2,352
2	Isami Kodaka	5	25	1,116
3	Abdullah Kobayashi	5	7	997
4	Yuko Miyamoto	3	24	992
5	Kohei Sato	3	13	973
6	Fuminori Abe	3	18	951
6	Takuya Nomura	3	18	951
8	Men's Teioh	2	10	831
9	Ryuji Yamakawa/Mr. Big Japan	7	9	821
10	Shuji Ishikawa	3	11	805
11	Shadow WX	4	14	781
12	Yuji Okabayashi	6	10	662
13	Yoshihito Sasaki	4	6	562
14	Mammoth Sasaki	2	10	547
15	Daikokubo Benkei	1	1	460
16	"Black Angel" Jaki Numazawa	4	2	421
16	Ryota Hama	2	2	421
18	Ryuji Ito	3	6	387
19	Tomoaki Honma	2	3	385
20	Hideyoshi Kamitani	5	5	346
21	Jun Kasai	3	2	316
22	Kazumi Kikuta †	2	5	310+
23	Masashi Takeda	3	3	292
24	Gentaro	1	1	289
24	Takashi Sasaki	1	1	289
26	Toru Sugiura †	1	5	287+
27	Yasufumi Nakanoue	1	2	269
28	Kamikaze	2	5	257
29	Takumi Tsukamoto	2	3	232
30	Yoshihiro Tajiri	2	3	213
31	Dale Patricks	2	2	210
31	Madman Pondo	2	2	210
33	Kankuro Hoshino	1	3	191
34	Shinobu	2	2	165
35	Shadow Winger	1	4	158
36	The Bodyguard	1	1	134
37	Kengo Mashimo	1	1	133
37	Madoka	1	1	133
39	Daichi Hashimoto	3	4	130
40	Shunme Matsuzaki	1	3	122
41	Shoji Nakamaki	1	2	112
42	Masaya Takahashi	1	2	78
42	Sagat	1	2	78
44	Shigehiro Irie	1	1	72
45	Mike Samples	1	0	38
46	Shinya Ishikawa	1	0	31
47	Ryuichi Kawakami	1	0	23
48	Justice Pain	1	0	22
48	Wifebeater	1	0	22
50	So Daimonji	1	1	17
51	Brahman Kei	1	0	13
51	Brahman Shu	1	0	13
53	Gedo	1	0	11
53	Jado	1	0	11
54	Zandig	1	0	8
54	Kengo Kimura	1	0	8
54	Nick Gage	1	0	8
54	Takashi Ishikawa	1	0	8
59	Badboy Hido	1	0	4

== See also ==
- Professional wrestling in Japan
