= CZW Iron Man Championship =

Professional wrestling championship

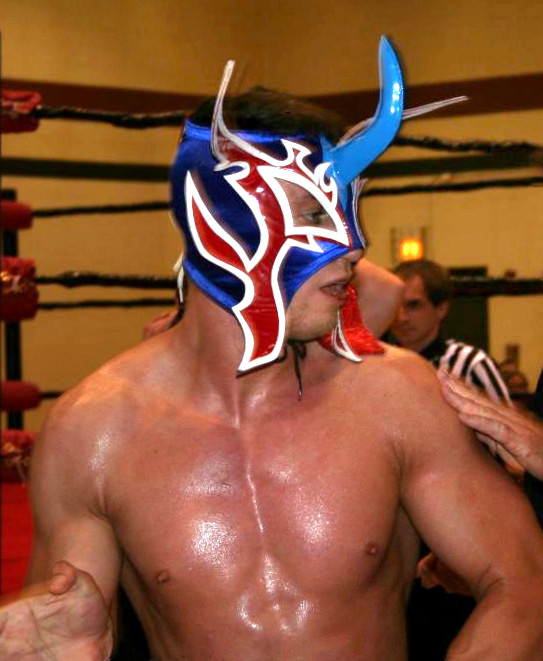
- Egotistico Fantastico was the final CZW Iron Man/New Horror Champion.

Details
- Promotion: Combat Zone Wrestling
- Date established: February 13, 1999
- Date retired: July 11, 2009

Other name(s)
- CZW Iron Man Championship; CZW New Horror Championship
Statistics
- First champion(s): Derek Domino
- Final champion(s): Egotistico Fantastico
- Most reigns: Wifebeater (4 reigns)
- Longest reign: Kevin Steen (364 days)
- Shortest reign: Derek Domino and Wifebeater (<1 day)

The CZW Iron Man Championship was a professional wrestling championship owned by the Combat Zone Wrestling (CZW) promotion. The championship was created and debuted on February 13, 1999, at CZW's Opening Night event. The title is currently inactive, having been deactivated on July 11, 2009. Prior to its retirement, Sami Callihan renamed the title the CZW New Horror Championship, which CZW recognized. Being a professional wrestling championship, the title is won via a scripted ending to a match or awarded to a wrestler because of a storyline.

Overall, there were 37 reigns shared among 24 wrestlers, with two vacancies. All title changes occurred at CZW-promoted events. The inaugural champion was Derek Domino, who was recognized as champion on February 13, 1999, at CZW's Opening Night event by CZW. Wifebeater holds the record of most reigns, with four. At 364 days, Kevin Steen's only reign is the longest in the title's history. Lobo, with a combined three reigns, holds the record for most days as champion at 392. Domino's only and Wifebeater's second reign share the record for shortest reign at less than one day. Egotistico Fantastico was the final champion in his only reign before the title's deactivation.

== History ==
Upon the title's creation, CZW recognized Derek Domino as the first CZW Iron Man Champion on February 13, 1999, at their Opening Night event. Domino immediately had to defend the title that night against Lobo, who went on to win the match and the championship. On June 10, 2000, at CZW's Caged To The End event, Mad Man Pondo defeated Wifebeater to win the championship. However, on July 22, 2000, at CZW's No Rules, No Limits event, Wifebeater was awarded the championship without facing Pondo in a match for unknown reasons. Instead, that night Wifebeater defended the title against Nick Gage, who went on to win the title. During Lobo's third reign CZW held their Breakaway Brawl show on June 9, 2001. A Triple Threat Deathmatch for the CZW Iron Man Championship occurred involving Nick Mondo, Wifebeater, and Mad Man Pondo, which Mondo won to become champion. Lobo was not involved due to a broken leg injury he sustained from the night before.

At CZW's High Stakes on May 11, 2002, CZW held a Four Way match for the CZW World Heavyweight and CZW Iron Man Championships, in which then-CZW World Heavyweight Champion Justice Pain and then-Iron Man Champion Adam Flash defended against The Messiah and Mondo. If a champion was pinned by another competitor, then they lost their championship in the encounter. Mondo ended up pinning Flash to win the Iron Man Championship in the bout. On July 13, 2002, at CZW's Deja Vu, Flash and Pain fought to a double pinfall for the CZW Iron Man and World Heavyweight Championships, which Pain held. Due to the double pinfall, Flash won the Iron Man Championship, while Pain retained the World Heavyweight Championship.

On August 13, 2005, at CZW's Deja Vu 3, Kevin Steen defeated Franky The Mobster to begin the longest reign in the title's history. At 364 days, Steen's reign came to an end when he was pinned by LuFisto at CZW's Trapped, who became the first woman to win the title. At CZW's X: Decade of Destruction – 10th Anniversary event on February 14, 2009, Sami Callihan defeated Brain Damage to win the title. Later during his reign, Callihan renamed the title the CZW New Horror Championship.

The title was vacated twice during its history before being retired in July 2009. The first vacancy occurred July 26, 2003 due to then-champion Mondo sustaining an injury. LuFisto was forced to vacate on January 13, 2007, when she also sustained an injury. Egotistico Fantastico was the last champion, by defeating Callihan on June 13, 2009, at CZW's Best Of The Best 9 gathering before the title was deactivated on July 11, 2009.

== Reigns ==
Key
No.	Overall reign number
Reign	Reign number for the specific champion
Days	Number of days held

No.	Champion	Championship change			Reign statistics		Notes	Ref.
No.	Champion	Date	Event	Location	Reign	Days	Notes	Ref.
1	Derek Domino	February 13, 1999	Opening Night	Mantua Township, New Jersey	1	<1	Domino was recognized as the first CZW Iron Man Champion by Combat Zone Wrestling.	
2	Lobo	February 13, 1999	Opening Night	Mantua Township, New Jersey	1	126		
3	Justice Pain	June 19, 1999	Down in Flames	Mantua Township, New Jersey	1	119		
4	Lobo	October 16, 1999	Cage of Death I	Mantua Township, New Jersey	2	147		
5	Wifebeater	March 11, 2000	March Violence	Sewell, New Jersey	1	91		
6	Mad Man Pondo	June 10, 2000	Caged to the End	Sewell, New Jersey	1	42		
7	Wifebeater	July 22, 2000	No Rules, No Limits	Sewell, New Jersey	2	<1	Wifebeater was awarded the title.	
8	Nick Gage	July 22, 2000	No Rules, No Limits	Sewell, New Jersey	1	77		
9	Wifebeater	October 7, 2000	Rules Are Made To Be Broken	Sewell, New Jersey	3	44		
10	Nate Hatred	November 20, 2000	Jersey Rulz	Sewell, New Jersey	1	62		
11	Wifebeater	January 21, 2001	Delaware Invasion	Smyrna, Delaware	4	20		
12	Lobo	February 10, 2001	Crushing the Competition	Sewell, New Jersey	3	119		
13	Nick Mondo	June 9, 2001	Breakaway Brawl	Smyrna, Delaware	1	49	This was a Triple Threat Deathmatch also involving Wifebeater and Mad Man Pondo. Lobo was not involved in the match for unknown reasons.	
14	Nick Gage	July 28, 2001	What About Lobo?	Sewell, New Jersey	2	91		
15	Nick Berk	October 27, 2001	...And Justice for All	Sewell, New Jersey	1	49		
16	Adam Flash	December 15, 2001	Cage of Death III	Philadelphia, Pennsylvania	1	147		
17	Nick Mondo	May 11, 2002	High Stakes	Philadelphia, Pennsylvania	2	28	This was a Four Way match for the CZW World Heavyweight and CZW Iron Man Championships involving CZW World Heavyweight Champion Justice Pain and The Messiah, in which Mondo pinned Flash to win the championship.	
18	Justice Pain	June 8, 2002	Best of the Best 2	Philadelphia, Pennsylvania	2	35		
19	Adam Flash	July 13, 2002	Deja Vu	Philadelphia, Pennsylvania	2	91	This was also for the CZW World Heavyweight Championship, which Pain held. The match ended in a double pinfall, causing Pain to retain the World Heavyweight Championship, but lose the Iron Man Championship to Flash.	
20	The Messiah	October 12, 2002	Beyond the Barrier	Philadelphia, Pennsylvania	1	119		
21	Nick Mondo	February 8, 2003	Uncivilized	Philadelphia, Pennsylvania	3	168		
—	Vacated	July 26, 2003	—	—	—	—	The title was vacated due to Mondo sustaining an injury.	
22	Trent Acid	September 13, 2003	Redefined	Philadelphia, Pennsylvania	1	91	Acid won the title in a Three Way Iron Man match also involving Jimmy Rave and Nick Gage. This was the Finals of a Tournament to decide the new champion.	
23	Jimmy Rave	December 13, 2003	Cage Of Death V: Suspended	Philadelphia, Pennsylvania	1	140		
24	Chris Hero	May 1, 2004	Apocalypse	Philadelphia, Pennsylvania	1	224		
25	B-Boy	December 11, 2004	Cage of Death VI	Philadelphia, Pennsylvania	1	56		
26	Franky The Mobster	February 5, 2005	Only the Strong	Philadelphia, Pennsylvania	1	189		
27	Kevin Steen	August 13, 2005	Deja Vu 3	Philadelphia, Pennsylvania	1	364		
28	LuFisto	August 12, 2006	Trapped	Philadelphia, Pennsylvania	1	154	LuFisto was the first woman to win the CZW Iron Man Championship as well as first woman to win any championship in Combat Zone Wrestling.	
—	Vacated	January 13, 2007	—	—	—	—	The title was vacated due to LuFisto sustaining an injury.	
29	D. J. Hyde	February 10, 2007	H8	Philadelphia, Pennsylvania	1	91	Hyde defeated Adam Flash and Chris Hero in a Triple Threat match to win the vacant title.	
30	Toby Klein	May 12, 2007	Restore the Order	Philadelphia, Pennsylvania	1	119		
31	D. J. Hyde	September 8, 2007	Chri$ Ca$h Memorial Show	Philadelphia, Pennsylvania	2	63		
32	Joker	November 10, 2007	Night of Infamy 6	Philadelphia, Pennsylvania	1	63		
33	Brain Damage	January 12, 2008	New Years Resolutions'	Philadelphia, Pennsylvania	1	154		
34	D. J. Hyde	June 14, 2008	Summer School	Philadelphia, Pennsylvania	3	28		
35	Brain Damage	July 12, 2008	A Tangled Web	Philadelphia, Pennsylvania	2	217		
36	Sami Callihan	February 14, 2009	X: Decade of Destruction – 10th Anniversary	Philadelphia, Pennsylvania	1	119	Callihan renamed the title the "CZW New Horror Championship", with CZW acknowledging the change afterwards.	
37	Egotistico Fantastico	June 13, 2009	Best of the Best 9	Philadelphia, Pennsylvania	1	28		
—	Deactivated	July 11, 2009	—	—	—	—	CZW deactivated the championship.	

== Combined reigns ==
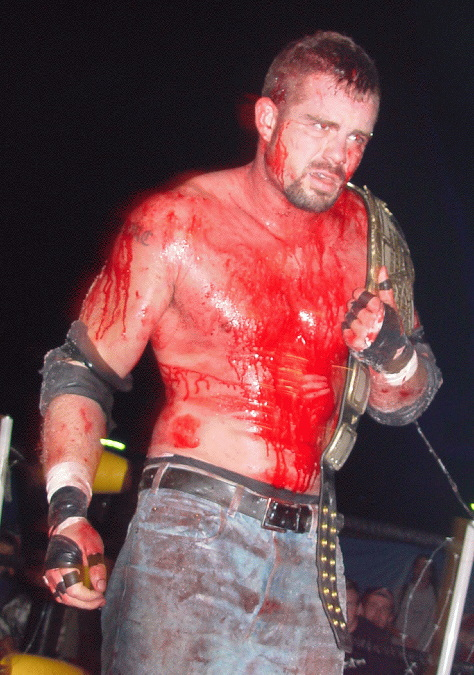
Wifebeater holds the record for most reigns as CZW Iron Man Champion

Rank	Wrestler	No. of reigns	Combined days
1	Lobo	3	392
2	Brain Damage	2	371
3	Kevin Steen	1	364
4	Nick Mondo	3	245
5	Adam Flash	2	238
6	Chris Hero	1	224
7	Franky The Mobster	1	189
8	D. J. Hyde	3	182
9	Nick Gage	2	168
10	Wifebeater	4	155
11	Justice Pain	2	154
11	LuFisto	1	154
13	Jimmy Rave	1	140
14	The Messiah	1	119
14	Sami Callihan	1	119
14	Toby Klein	1	119
17	Trent Acid	1	91
18	Joker	1	63
19	Nate Hatred	1	62
20	B-Boy	1	56
21	Nick Berk	1	49
22	Mad Man Pondo	1	42
23	Egotistico Fantastico	1	28
24	Derek Domino	1	<1
