= Wifebeater (wrestler) =

American wrestler (born 1973)

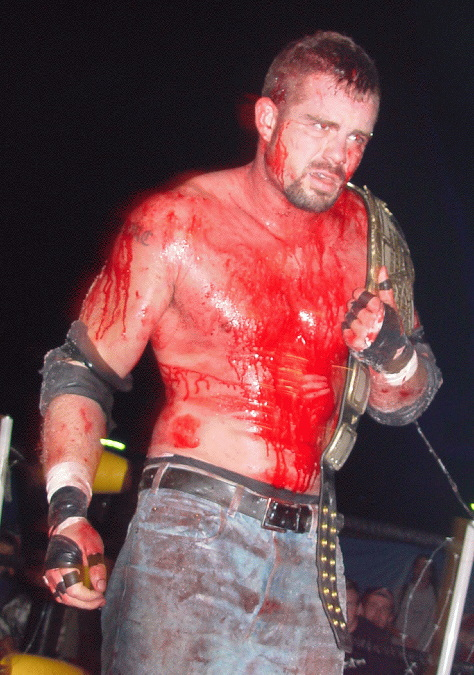
- Wifebeater in August 2002

Personal information
- Born: Matthew Prince; July 13, 1973 (age 53) Dallas, Texas, U.S.

Professional wrestling career
- Ring name(s): Matt Martini; Wifebeater
- Billed height: 6 ft 4 in (193 cm)
- Billed weight: 244 lb (111 kg)
- Billed from: Trailer Trash, Texas
- Trained by: The Pitbulls
- Debut: 1998
- Retired: 2006

Matthew Prince (born July 13, 1973), better known by his ring name Wifebeater, is an American former professional wrestler. He is best known for his tenure in Combat Zone Wrestling (CZW) from 1999 to 2004. He is also known for his ring attire (a wifebeater and jeans) and a weed whacker that he brought to the ring with him, and sometimes used on his opponents.

== Professional wrestling career ==
Wifebeater debuted in Combat Zone Wrestling on August 21, 1999, at "Pyramid of Hell" on the losing end of a match against Trent Acid. On September 18, 1999, Wifebeater defeated Nick Gage to win his first World Heavyweight Championship. Wifebeater held the title until November 20, 1999, when he lost it to John Zandig. Wifebeater went on to win the CZW Heavyweight Championship two more times and the Iron Man Championship four times. He also teamed up with Justice Pain to form the "H8 Club" and win the World Tag Team Championship. Wifebeater and Justice Pain lost the titles to Nick Gage and Nate Hatred, who later also referred to themselves as the H8 Club. After their title loss and failure to regain the titles in a rematch, Wifebeater and Justice Pain broke up and began feuding. This feud ended at Cage of Death III inside the Cage of Death for the CZW World Heavyweight Championship where Pain defeated Wifebeater. During one period in 2001, Wifebeater was a member of the stable "Big Dealz" along with Zandig, Nick Mondo, Jun Kasai, Z-Barr, and Trent Acid.

In 2002, Wifebeater won the first-ever CZW Tournament of Death after defeating Mondo in the final. He wrestled a retirement match in November 2002, but made a return a year later in the same month to join Zandig's team for Cage of Death V. In 2004, he won the third Tournament of Death, after defeating Necro Butcher in the finals. Later in the year, Justice Pain returned and rejoined Wifebeater to reform the H8 Club. They targeted the H8 Club of Gage and Hatred and defeated the pair at Cage Of Death 6 on December 11, though after their victory Pain turned on Wifebeater. He subsequently made infrequent appearances in CZW, including a run in on the ROH wrestlers during a big brawl between CZW and ROH at ROH's "Arena Warfare" in early 2006. His final match was at CZW's event Trapped on August 12, 2006, filling in for a vacant J. C. Bailey, where Wifebeater defeated Danny Havoc in a barbed wire cage.

== Championships and accomplishments ==
- Big Japan Pro Wrestling
  - BJW Tag Team Championship (1 time) – with Justice Pain
- Combat Zone Wrestling
  - CZW Death Match Championship (1 time)
  - CZW Iron Man Championship (4 times)
  - CZW World Heavyweight Championship (3 times)
  - CZW World Tag Team Championship (1 time) – with Justice Pain
  - Tournament of Death (I, III)
  - Match of the Year (2002) vs. Nick Mondo
  - CZW Hall of Fame (2009)
