= Justice Pain =

American professional wrestler (1978–2020)

Personal information
- Born: Christopher Wilson; May 16, 1978 Yonkers, New York, U.S.
- Died: January 24, 2020 (aged 41) Philadelphia, Pennsylvania, U.S.
- Cause of death: Suicide by jumping from height
- Family: Nick Gage (brother)

Professional wrestling career
- Ring name: Justice Pain
- Billed height: 5 ft 10 in (178 cm)
- Billed weight: 207 lb (94 kg)
- Trained by: John Zandig; Mr. Motion
- Debut: 1996
- Retired: 2007

Christopher Wilson (May 16, 1978 – January 24, 2020) was an American professional wrestler better known by his ring name, Justice Pain. Pain was best known for his tenures in Combat Zone Wrestling (CZW), Xtreme Pro Wrestling (XPW) and Pro Wrestling Unplugged (PWU). He held numerous titles in his CZW stint and was the real life brother of CZW wrestler and one-time tag team partner Nick Gage.

== Career ==
Justice Pain was trained by John Zandig at the CZW Wrestling School. He began his career as one of the main wrestlers in the company along with other graduates from the school, such as Lobo and Nick Gage. Pain feuded with Lobo, and wrestled him at the first ever Cage of Death in the first ever Cage of Death match. Pain won the match and defeated Lobo for the CZW Iron Man Championship. Justice Pain would also compete against Lobo in the Cage of Death at Cage of Death II and defeated him for the CZW Heavyweight Championship.

Justice Pain was well known for forming the original H8 Club with Wifebeater. While still holding the heavyweight championship, Justice Pain also won the tag team championship with Wifebeater. Around this time, a new H8 Club was formed with Nick Gage and Nate Hatred. This new team defeated Justice Pain and Wifebeater for the tag championship. After losing the titles, Justice Pain began teaming with The Backseat Boyz and started a feud with Wifebeater. The feud ended at Cage of Death III where Pain defeated Wifebeater in the Cage of Death. Justice Pain continued feuding with Nick Gage and Nate Hatred, but left CZW in 2003 to join Xtreme Pro Wrestling.

During his tenure in Xtreme Pro Wrestling (XPW) he feuded with Chris Candido, defeating Candido twice with the final bout being on the last show in the history of XPW.

When he returned in 2004, he reformed the H8 Club with Wifebeater. They teamed up to face Nick Gage and Nate Hatred at Cage of Death VI with the winners having the right to call themselves the H8 Club. At the end of the match, Nick Gage turned on Nate Hatred and allowed Justice Pain to pin Hatred. After this, Pain turned on Wifebeater and joined his real life brother as the new H8 Club. They won the tag team titles by defeating Team Cash in February 2005. At the end of 2005, Justice Pain once again competed in the Cage of Death match and came out on the winning side with partners Zandig and Nick Gage. That night, Lobo returned and joined them as well. During the next months, Pain teamed up with Nick Gage, Zandig, Lobo, and Dewey Donovan as The Forefathers of CZW. The Forefathers would later break up due to problems between Gage, Zandig, and Lobo.

At Night of Infamy V, Justice Pain got a shot at Eddie Kingston for the world title, but did not win. Due to interference in the match, Pain was granted another shot at Cage of Death 8 in a triple threat elimination match which also included Chris Hero. Pain eliminated Kingston by submission after Kingston's ankle was severely injured early in the match. After hitting Hero with the Pain Thriller, Justice Pain pinned him to win the title for a fifth time.

Pain retired in 2007 at the age of 29.

== Death ==
Wilson died on January 24, 2020, by jumping off the Walt Whitman Bridge in Philadelphia after being chased by police. He was 41 years old. Wilson had suffered from drug addiction and paranoia.

== Championships and accomplishments ==
- Big Japan Pro Wrestling
  - BJW Tag Team Championship (1 time) – with Wifebeater
- Dynamite Championship Wrestling
  - DCW Heavyweight Championship (1 time)
- Combat Zone Wrestling
  - CZW Iron Man Championship (2 times)
  - CZW World Heavyweight Championship (5 times)
  - CZW World Junior Heavyweight Championship (2 times)
  - CZW World Tag Team Championship (4 times) – with himself (1), Wifebeater (1), Nick Gage (1) and Johnny Kashmere (1)
  - First Triple Crown Champion
  - First Grand Slam Champion
  - CZW Hall of Fame (2025)
- IPW Hardcore Wrestling
  - IPW Tag Team Championship (1 time) - with Nick Gage

== See also ==
- List of premature professional wrestling deaths
