= John Zandig =

American wrestler (born 1971)

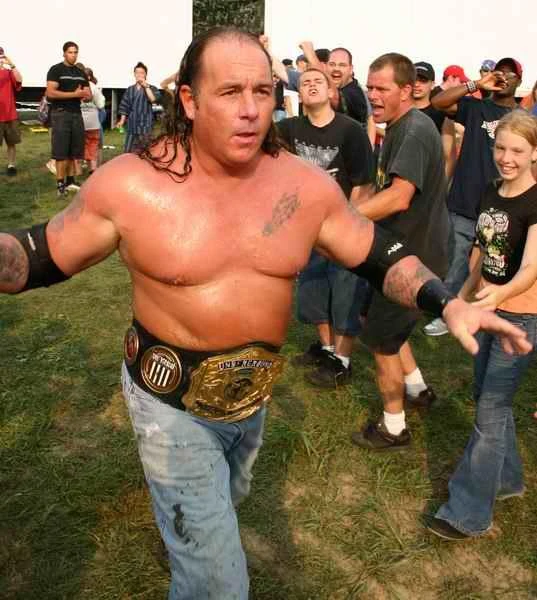

Personal information
- Born: John Corson; April 4, 1971 (age 55) Sewell, New Jersey, U.S.

Professional wrestling career
- Ring name(s): The Boss; John Zandig; Sex Machine; The Ultraviolent Icon; Zandig
- Billed height: 6 ft 2 in (188 cm)
- Billed weight: 256 lb (116 kg)
- Billed from: The Combat Zone
- Trained by: Larry Sharpe
- Debut: 1994
- Retired: 2017

John Corson (born April 4, 1971), better known by his ring name John Zandig, is an American professional wrestler and promoter. He is the founder and former owner of the promotion Combat Zone Wrestling (CZW).

== Early life ==
Corson was born in Sewell, New Jersey. Before he was a professional wrestler, Corson was an explosives and demolition expert.

== Professional wrestling career ==
Corson began training as a wrestler in 1994 and adopted the ring name John Zandig in 1999, his surname deriving from Misfits' front man and fellow New Jersey native, Glenn Danzig. Shortly after debuting, Zandig opened a professional wrestling school, in New Jersey in order to hone his skills. The school eventually evolved into a professional wrestling promotion, Combat Zone Wrestling, and relocated to Philadelphia in late 2001. From its early stages, CZW was oriented towards hardcore wrestling; Zandig himself has been involved in many ultraviolent matches since the company's inception, involving such objects as thumbtacks, fluorescent light tubes, barbed wire, and a weed wacker. On one occasion, he was hung from meat hooks.

Zandig wrestled in Japan as the leader of CZW to compete for Big Japan Pro Wrestling. In the early 2000s, Zandig appeared in a Japanese television commercial alongside the Japanese actress Ai Kato for a soft drink product named C1000 (by Takeda Food.Co), where he was knocked out by Ai's lariat. At Cage of Death 8, Zandig lost to Nick Gage in a four-way Cage of Death match that included Lobo and LuFisto. Due to a prematch stipulation, Zandig was forced to retire as a result of losing. On March 10, 2007, Zandig teamed with Toby Klein to face and defeat D. J. Hyde and Mitch Ryder in a no rope barbed wire match. Zandig was filling in for Necro Butcher, who couldn't make it to the show. After the match, Zandig stated that his return was for one night only.

Zandig once again came out of retirement at Tournament of Death 6 to face the Necro Butcher in a no-rope barbwired match when Necro Butcher's original opponent, Mitch Ryder, could not make the show due to travel issues. He came out of retirement for the third time at Cage of Death X, defeating Danny Havoc, Brain Damage, Drake Younger, Sami Callihan and Devon Moore in the 10,000 dollar Cage of Death match. That same night he was inducted into the New Alhambra Hardcore Hall of Fame.

On August 8, 2009, John Zandig held a CZW Hall of Fame induction for Jon Dahmer, Nick Gage, and Wifebeater; and recognition plaques for Mike Pancoast, Shawn and Sabine Kernaghan, WHACKS, and Maven Bentley. After announcing the Hall of Fame and special recognition plaques, Zandig announced that he was stepping down from CZW due to financial reasons and being too injured and tired to assume the duties that come with being the owner. Zandig announced that he had sold CZW, not for the price he wanted, but due to the economy it was enough to get him to sell. The new owner announced was CZW wrestler, D. J. Hyde. On October 25, 2009, Gage defeated Zandig in his retirement match.

On May 8, 2010, Zandig once again returned to the ring at CZW's Fist Fight and defeated Brain Damage in a Tournament of Death 9 qualifying match. Following his victory, Zandig was attacked by MASADA, setting up their first round meeting in June 2010's Tournament of Death 9 which Zandig no-showed due to injury. Zandig participated in the last CZW event held at the ECW Arena when he fought new CZW owner D. J. Hyde on January 14, 2012. This was the follow-up from a surprise run-in at COD 13 when he attacked Hyde during his match with Greg Excellent.

He returned to the ring once again on June 5, 2016 in another deathmatch tournament organised by him, this time in Game Changer Wrestling (GCW), called Tournament of Survival. He was not originally scheduled in the tournament and was to go one on one with Joey Janela, but when wrestler Scott Summers could not compete anymore, he took the helm and got to the finals (but dropped out) as well as defeating Janela, hitting another rooftop Mother F'n Bomb onto Janela through a burning plytube board with light tubes on top of a truck. The tournament was later won by Danny Havoc.

Zandig returned to CZW on June 11, 2016 for the annual Tournament of Death. During a non-tournament match between Josh Crane and current owner, D. J. Hyde, Zandig returned to the ring alongside Ruckus and Robbie Mireno and beat down Hyde until he would give up his ownership. However, Hyde would not, so along with the help of Josh Crane, Zandig, Mireno and Ruckus buried Hyde alive until he gave up (kayfabe) ownership of CZW.

== Other media ==
He appeared in the video game Backyard Wrestling 2: There Goes the Neighborhood, and made a cameo in the wrestling drama The Wrestler. He was also featured in VICE's Dark Side of the Ring.

== Championships and accomplishments ==
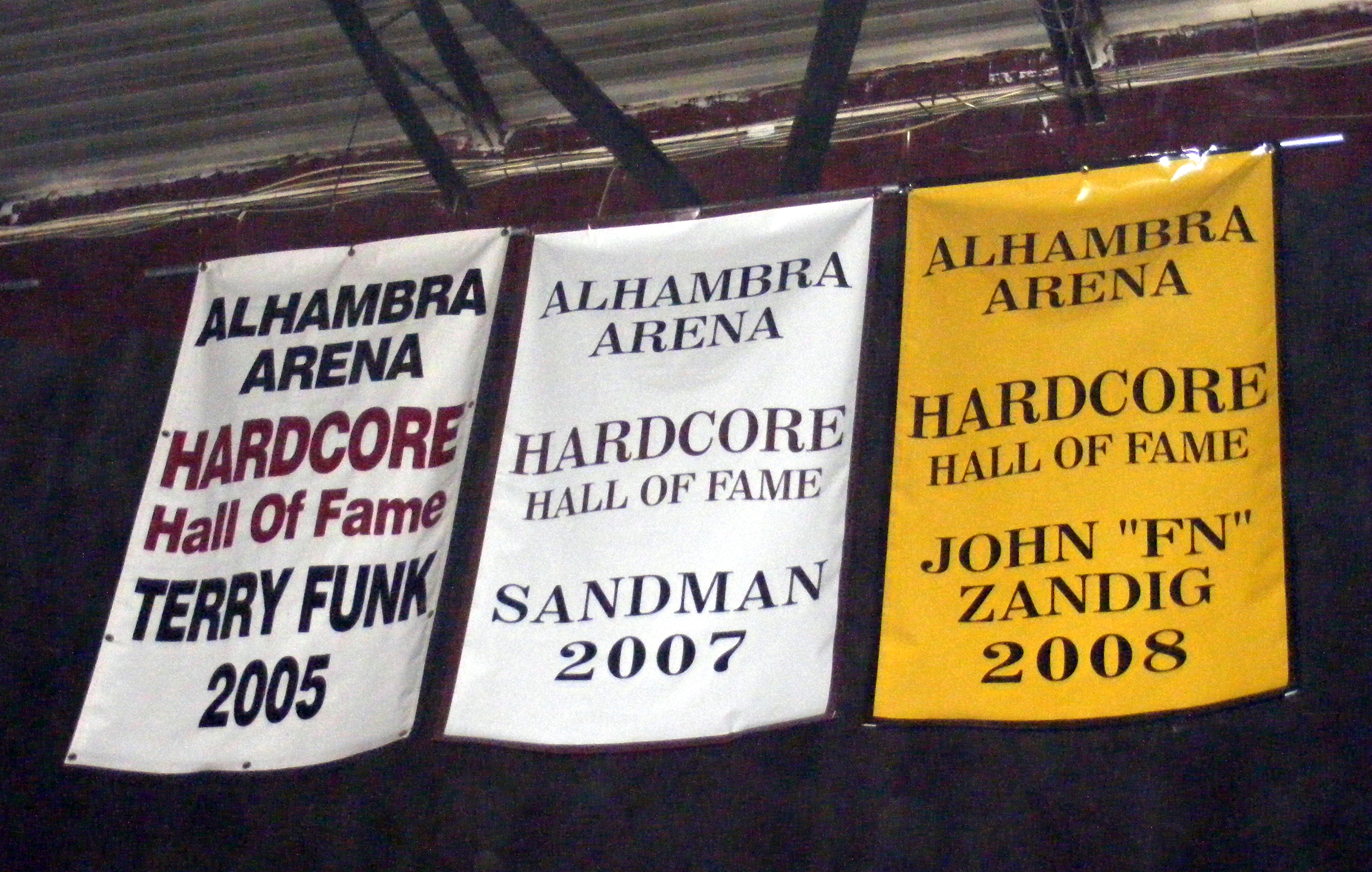
Zandig's Hardcore Hall of Fame banner in the former ECW Arena

- Big Japan Pro Wrestling
  - BJW Deathmatch Heavyweight Championship (3 times)
  - BJW Tag Team Championship (1 time) – with Nick Gage
  - World Extreme Cup (2000)
- Combat Zone Wrestling
  - CZW World Heavyweight Championship (6 times)
  - CZW World Tag Team Championship (1 time) – with Nick Gage
  - CZW Ultraviolent Underground Championship (1 time)
- Hardcore Hall of Fame
  - Class of 2008
- World Wrestling Association
  - WWA Heavyweight Championship (1 time)
