= CZW World Heavyweight Championship =

Professional wrestling championship

Details
- Promotion: Combat Zone Wrestling
- Date established: March 27, 1999
- Current champion: Akira
- Date won: September 5, 2026
Statistics
- First champion: Nick Gage
- Most reigns: John Zandig (6 reigns)
- Longest reign: Eran Ashe (783 days)
- Shortest reign: John Zandig, Nick Berk, Yoshihiro Tajiri, David Starr, Anthony Greene and Joe Gacy (<1 day)
- Oldest champion: BLK Jeez (35 years, 233 days)
- Youngest champion: Nick Gage (18 years, 186 days)
- Heaviest champion: Eran Arshe (330 lb (150 kg))
- Lightest champion: Lio Rush (161 lb (73 kg))

The CZW World Heavyweight Championship is a professional wrestling world heavyweight championship owned and promoted by the professional wrestling promotion Combat Zone Wrestling (CZW). It debuted on March 27, 1999 at CZW's The Staple Gun event.

The championship is generally contested in professional wrestling matches, often with hardcore (or "ultraviolent", as CZW generally terms it) stipulations. There have been a total of 59 reigns among 36 different wrestlers. The current champion is Akira who is in his second reign.

== History ==
=== Background ===
The championship was created and debuted on March 27, 1999 at CZW's The Staple Gun event, where Nick Gage defeated 20 other men in a battle royal to become the first champion. The championship has been defended and lost in countries other than the United States multiple times. The first time it changed hands on foreign soil was on April 15, 2001, when Wifebeater defeated John Zandig for the championship in Birmingham, England at a live event. Even though the CZW World Heavyweight Championship is supposed to only be eligible to "heavyweights" (wrestlers who weigh more than 220 lb (100 kg)), multiple lower-class wrestlers have held the championship. Wrestlers such as John Silver, Drake Younger, Nick Gage, Nick Berk, and Yoshihiro Tajiri are a few who have been storyline exceptions.

=== Belt design ===
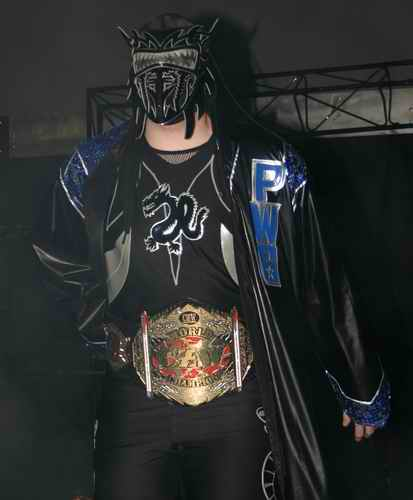
Super Dragon as CZW World Heavyweight Champion

The championship's current design involves five metal plates positioned on a leather strap. The central plate has the word "World" at the top, while the word "Champion" at the bottom. There are two light tubes that are placed at each end of the plate. The CZW logo is engraved at the very center of the plate.

== Reigns ==
The inaugural champion was Gage, who won the championship by defeating 20 other men in a battle royal on March 27, 1999 at CZW's The Staple Gun event. Eran Ashe's first reign, at 783 days, is the longest in the title's history. John Zandig, Nick Berk, Yoshihiro Tajiri, Gacy and David Starr are tied for shortest in the title's history at less than 1 day. Zandig holds the record for most reigns, with six.

== Footnotes ==
- 1. - This description is based on the current design of the CZW World Heavyweight Championship, as seen in the images throughout the article.
