= List of CZW World Tag Team Champions =

List of professional wrestling tag team champions

The CZW World Tag Team Championship was a professional wrestling world tag team championship owned and copyrighted by the Combat Zone Wrestling (CZW) promotion; it is contested for in their tag team division. The championship was created and debuted on February 13, 1999, at CZW's Opening Night event. Although the title is a world tag team championship, supposedly only intended for tag teams, a wrestler has held the championship by himself – Justice Pain. He held the championship on his own from November 20, 1999, to January 8, 2000, when he lost it to Diablos Macabre and Midknight, who are known as The Thrill Kill Kult, the same team he defeated to win the championship.

The inaugural champions were Jon Dahmer and Jose Rivera Jr., who were awarded the championship on February 13, 1999, at CZW's Opening Night event. As of October 2026, BLK-OUT which consist of Ruckus and Sabian/BLK Jeez hold the record for most reigns, with five. Sabian holds the record for the most individual reigns with 9. The REP's third reign is the longest in the title's history, at 910 days. At less than one day, Dahmer and Rivera, Jr.'s only reign and 2 Girls, 1 Cup (Beef Wellington and Greg Excellent)'s first reign are tied for the shortest. Milk Chocolate (Randy Summers & Brandon Watts) are the current champions, winning at Limelight XX against CMD (Boom Harding & DeSean Pratt).

== Title history ==
Key
No.	Overall reign number
Reign	Reign number for the specific team—reign numbers for the individuals are in parentheses, if different
Days	Number of days held
<1	Reign lasted less than a day
+	Current reign is changing daily

No.	Champion	Championship change			Reign statistics		Notes	Ref.
No.	Champion	Date	Event	Location	Reign	Days	Notes	Ref.
1	Jon Dahmer and Jose Rivera, Jr.	February 13, 1999	Opening Night	Mantua Township, NJ	1	<1	Dahmer and Rivera, Jr. were awarded the championship.	
2	The Brothers of East L.A. (Angel Vera and Bobby Muniz)	February 13, 1999	Opening Night	Mantua Township, NJ	1	98		
3	Extreme Fahrenheit (Heartbreaker and Mr. Motion)	May 22, 1999	May Madness	Mantua Township, NJ	1	28		
—	Vacated	June 19, 1999	Down in Flames	Mantua Township, NJ	—	—	Championship was vacated after a title defense against Jon Dahmer and Middknight ended in a double pinfall.	
4	The King Pinz (Bill Schaffer and Jim Price)	July 17, 1999	Street Fight 99	Mantua Township, NJ	1	7	The King Pinz defeated Extreme Fahrenheit (Heartbreaker and Mr. Motion) and Jon Dahmer and Middknight in a Three Way match to win the vacant championship.	
5	John Zandig and Nick Gage	July 24, 1999	N/A	Mantua Township, NJ	1	77		
6	Lobo and T.C.K.	October 9, 1999	Pain In The Rain	National Park, NJ	1	23		
—	Vacated	November 1, 1999	—	—	—	—		
7	Justice Pain	November 20, 1999	The War Begins	Mantua Township, NJ	1	49	Pain defeated The Thrill Kill Kult (Diablos Macabre and Midknight) in a handicap match to become sole champion.	
8	The Thrill Kill Kult (Diablos Macabre and Midknight)	January 8, 2000	Bloodbath 2000	Sewell, NJ	1	28	The Thrill Kill Kult defeated Pain in a handicap match to win the championship.	
9	The Kashmerinos (Johnny Kashmere and Robby Mireno)	February 5, 2000	A Night Of Main Events	Sewell, NJ	1	7		
10	The Haas Brothers (Charlie Haas and Russ Haas)	February 12, 2000	Climbing The Ladder	Blackwood, NJ	1	119		
11	The Backseat Boyz (Johnny Kashmere (2) and Trent Acid)	June 10, 2000	Caged to the End	Sewell, NJ	1	63	Johnny defeated Russ in a standard wrestling match to win the championship.	
12	Nick Mondo and Ric Blade	August 12, 2000	Blood, Sweat and Violence	Sewell, NJ	1	56		
13	H8 Club (Justice Pain (2) and Wifebeater)	October 7, 2000	Rules Are Made To Be Broken	Sewell, NJ	1	179		
14	H8 Club (Nate Hatred and Nick Gage (2))	April 4, 2001	Payback	Dover, DE	1	101		
15	The Briscoe Brothers (Jay Briscoe and Mark Briscoe)	July 14, 2001	Hate Club: Dead?	Smyrna, DE	1	14		
16	Justice Pain (3) and Johnny Kashmere (3)	July 28, 2001	What about Lobo?	Sewell, NJ	1	20		
17	Jun Kasai and Men's Teioh	August 17, 2001	Live event	Nagoya, Japan	1	2	Kasai and Teioh won the title at a Big Japan Pro Wrestling event.	
18	The Backseat Boyz (Johnny Kashmere (4) and Trent Acid (2))	August 19, 2001	Live event	Yokohama, Japan	2	202		
19	VD (Eddie Valentine and Jon Dahmer (2))	March 9, 2002	Out With the Old, In With the New	Philadelphia, PA	1	63		
20	H8 Club (Nate Hatred (2) and Nick Gage (3))	May 11, 2002	High Stakes	Philadelphia, PA	2	273		
21	The Backseat Boyz (Johnny Kashmere (5) and Trent Acid (3))	February 8, 2003	Uncivilized	Philadelphia, PA	3	343		
22	Rebel's Army (Derek Frazier, Greg Matthews and Rockin' Rebel)	January 17, 2004	Street Fight 2K4	Philadelphia, PA	1	77		
23	H8 Club (Nate Hatred (3) and Nick Gage (4))	April 3, 2004	Retribution	Philadelphia, PA	3	70		
24	BLK-OUT (Ruckus and Sabian)	June 12, 2004	Trifecta Elimination 2	Philadelphia, PA	1	182		
25	Team Ca$h (Chri$ Ca$h, J. C. Bailey, Nate Webb, and SeXXXy Eddy)	December 11, 2004	Cage of Death VI	Philadelphia, PA	1	56	Team Ca$h defeated The BLK-OUT (Ruckus, Sabian, Eddie Kingston and Jack Evans) in a Cage of Death match. After the match, CZW owner John Zandig announced that all members of Team Ca$h were champions.	
26	H8 Club (Justice Pain (4) and Nick Gage (5))	February 5, 2005	Only the Strong	Philadelphia, PA	1	154		
27	Tough Crazy Bastards (Necro Butcher and Toby Klein)	July 9, 2005	High Stakes 3	Philadelphia, PA	1	63		
28	The Kings of Wrestling (Chris Hero and Claudio Castagnoli)	September 10, 2005	A Big Mutha F'N Deal	Philadelphia, PA	1	154		
29	BLK-OUT (Eddie Kingston and Joker)	February 11, 2006	Seven Years Strong: Settling The Score	Philadelphia, PA	1	210		
—	Vacated	September 9, 2006	—	—	—	—	Championship was vacated when Joker left the company.	
30	The Kings of Wrestling (Chris Hero and Claudio Castagnoli)	October 14, 2006	Last Team Standing	Philadelphia, PA	2	28	The Kings of Wrestling defeated Justice Pain and Human Tornado in a tournament final to win the vacant championship.	
31	BLK-OUT (Robbie Mireno (2) and Sabian (2))	November 11, 2006	Night of Infamy 5	Philadelphia, PA	1	28		
32	Blackout (Onyx and Rainman)	December 9, 2006	Cage of Death VIII: Coming Undone	Philadelphia, PA	1	35		
33	BLK-OUT (Ruckus (2) and Sabian (3))	January 13, 2007	New Year, New Opportunities	Philadelphia, PA	2	238		
34	Team AnDrew (Andy Sumner and Drew Gulak)	September 8, 2007	The Chri$ Ca$h Memorial Show	Philadelphia, PA	1	35		
35	Derek Frazier (2) and Niles Young	October 13, 2007	Choosing Sides	Philadelphia, PA	1	56		
36	Danny Demanto and Jon Dahmer (3)	December 8, 2007	Cage of Death IX	Philadelphia, PA	1	63		
37	Naptown Dragons (Dustin Lee and Scotty Vortekz)	February 9, 2008	9 F'N Years	Philadelphia, PA	1	154		
38	Team AnDrew (Andy Sumner and Drew Gulak)	July 12, 2008	A Tangled Web	Philadelphia, PA	2	91		
39	2 Girls, 1 Cup (Beef Wellington and Greg Excellent)	October 11, 2008	Decision '08	Philadelphia, PA	1	<1		
40	BLK-OUT (Ruckus (3) and Sabian (4))	October 11, 2008	Decision '08	Philadelphia, PA	3	28		
41	2 Girls, 1 Cup (Beef Wellington and Greg Excellent)	November 8, 2008	Night of Infamy 7: Greed	Philadelphia, PA	2	126		
42	The Best Around (Bruce Maxwell and T.J. Cannon)	March 14, 2009	Total Havoc	Philadelphia, PA	1	392		
43	The Suicide Kings (Eddie Kingston (2) and Drake Younger)	April 10, 2010	Swingin' for the Fences	Philadelphia, PA	1	91		
—	Vacated	July 10, 2010	Home Sweet Home	Philadelphia, PA	—	—	D. J. Hyde stripped the titles from Kingston and Younger after Kingston left the company.	
44	Philly's Most Wanted (Joker (2) and Sabian (5))	December 11, 2010	Cage of Death XII	Philadelphia, PA	1	63		
45	The Briscoe Brothers (Jay Briscoe and Mark Briscoe)	February 12, 2011	Twelve: The Twelfth Anniversary Event	Philadelphia, PA	2	91		
46	Philly's Most Wanted (Joker (3) and Sabian (6))	May 14, 2011	Proving Grounds	Philadelphia, PA	2	182		
47	4Loco (Azrieal and Bandido Jr.)	November 12, 2011	Night of Infamy X	Philadelphia, PA	1	273		
48	Nation of Intoxication (Danny Havoc, Devon Moore and Lucky 13)	August 11, 2012	Tangled Web 5	Voorhees Township, NJ	1	63	Devon Moore and Lucky 13 won the titles, but were allowed to defend them along with Danny Havoc under the Freebird rule.	
49	4Loco (Azrieal and Bandido Jr.)	October 13, 2012	Cerebral	Voorhees Township, NJ	2	56	Defeated Havoc and Moore to win the titles.	
50	Nation of Intoxication (Danny Havoc, Devon Moore and Lucky 13)	December 8, 2012	Cage of Death XIV	Voorhees Township, NJ	2	63	This was contested in a Ultraviolent Insanity match against 4Loco (Alex Colon, Azreal, Bandido Jr., and Chrissy Rivera). Lucky 13 retrieved the titles for his team to win.	
51	The Catalyst (Dustin Rayz and Eric Ryan)	February 9, 2013	CZW 14th Anniversary Show	Voorhees Township, NJ	1	55	This match also included Nation of Domination and OI4K.	
52	BLK-OUT (Ruckus (4) and Blk Jeez (7))	April 5, 2013	CZW WrestleCon Event	Secaucus, NJ	4	281		
53	The Beaver Boys (Alex Reynolds and John Silver)	January 11, 2014	Answering the Challenge	Voorhees Township, NJ	1	106		
54	Juicy Product (J. T. Dunn and David Starr)	April 27, 2014	CZW To Infinity	Providence, RI	1	153		
55	OI4K (Dave Crist and Jake Crist)	September 27, 2014	Deja Vu 2014	Dayton, OH	1	287		
56	Team Tremendous (Bill Carr and Dan Barry)	July 11, 2015	New Heights 2015	Phileadelphia, PA	1	154	This match also included The Young Bucks and The Beaver Boys.	
57	TVReady (BLK Jeez (8) and Pepper Parks)	December 12, 2015	Cage Of Death XVII	Voorhees Township, NJ	1	154	Sozio replaced Bill Carr in the match.	
58	Da Hit Squad (Dan Maff and Monsta Mack)	May 14, 2016	Prelude To Violence 2016	Voorhees Township, NJ	1	210		
59	EYFBO (Angel Ortiz and Mike Dratzik)	December 10, 2016	Cage Of Death 18	Voorhees Township, NJ	1	<1		
60	Scarlet and Graves (Dezmond Xavier and Zachary Wentz)	December 10, 2016	Cage Of Death 18	Voorhees Township, NJ	1	166		
61	CCK (Chris Brookes and Kid Lykos)	May 25, 2017	Lucha Forever Catch Me Outside	Birmingham, West Midlands, England	1	184		
62	Scarlet and Graves (Dezmond Xavier and Zachary Wentz)	November 25, 2017	SWE Ill Manors 2017	Sheffield, South Yorkshire, England	2	14	This was a Triple Threat match also including GBH (Damian Dunne and Kip Sabian).	
63	The REP (Dave McCall and Nate Carter)	December 9, 2017	Cage Of Death 19	Sewell, NJ	1	273	This was a four-way match also including Alex Reynolds and Dan Barry and OI4K (Dave Crist and Jake Crist).	
64	BLK-OUT (Ruckus (5) and Blk Jeez (9))	September 8, 2018	Down With The Sickness 2018	Voorhees Township, NJ	5	92		
65	The REP (Dave McCall (2) and Nate Carter (2))	December 9, 2018	Cage of Death 20	Voorhees Township, NJ	2	148		
66	The House Of Gangone (Anthony Gangone and Amazing Red)	March 2, 2019	Trifecta Elimination 2019	Voorhees Township, NJ	1	3		
67	The REP (Dave McCall (3) and Nate Carter (3))	March 5, 2019	N/A	Philadelphia, Pennsylvania	3	910 (Note: CZW ceased operations during the COVID pandemic, therefore the length of this reign is uncertain.)	The United Wrestling Network and CZW returned the titles to The REP due to the controversial finish to the match at Trifecta Elimination 2019. After the incident, Gangone kept the title belts in his possession, and proclaimed himself as the sole Tag Team Champion. At To Hell and Back 2019, The REP regained the belts, defeating Gangone and Homicide.	
—	Vacated	August 31, 2021	—	—	—	—	Due to Combat Zone Wrestling ceasing operations because of the COVID pandemic, the titles were abandoned somewhere at the beginning of 2021.	
68	CMD (Boom Harden and Desean Pratt)	March 5, 2023	CZW Limelight 14	Havre de Grace, MD	1	182	This was a four-way ladder match for the vacant titles also involving Milk Chocolate (Brandon Watts and Randy Summers), Post Game (Mike Walker and Vinny Talotta), and The REP (Dave McCall and Nate Carter).	
69	Milk Chocolate (Brandon Watts and Randy Summers)	September 3, 2023	Limelight XX (20)	Havre de Grace, MD	1	538		
70	Post Game (Mike Walker and Vinny Tallota)	February 22, 2025	CZW 26th Anniversary	Atlantic City, NJ	1	119		
71	Rivality (MBM and Ultima Sombra)	June 21, 2025	CZW Showdown At Sundown	Croydon, Pennsylvania	1	98		
72	Post Game (Mike Walker and Vinny Tallota)	September 27, 2025	BZW Just An Illusion	Bapaume, France	2	21	Won the titles at a BZW event	
73	The Lost Boys (Anthan Promise and Miles Penn)	October 18, 2025	CZW Deja Vu 2025	Camden, New Jersey	1	365+		

== Combined reigns ==
As of October 18, 2026.

Symbol	Meaning
†	Indicates the current champion(s)
¤	The exact length of at least one title reign is uncertain; the combined length may not be correct.
<1	Indicates that the reign lasted less than one day.

=== By team ===
Rank	Team	No. of reigns	Combined days
1	The REP (Dave McCall and Nate Carter)	3	1,089¤
2	BLK-OUT (Ruckus and Sabian/BLK Jeez)	5	821
3	The Backseat Boyz (Johnny Kashmere and Trent Acid)	3	628
4	Milk Chocolate (Brandon Watts and Randy Summers)	1	538
5	H8 Club (Nate Hatred and Nick Gage)	3	444
6	The Best Around (Bruce Maxwell and T.J. Cannon)	1	392
7	4Loco (Azireal and Bandido Jr.)	2	329
8	OI4K (Dave Crist and Jake Crist)	1	287
9	Philly's Most Wanted (Joker and Sabian)	2	245
10	Da Hit Squad (Dan Maff and Monsta Mack)	1	210
10	BLK-OUT (Eddie Kingston and Joker)	1	210
12	The Lost Boys † (Anthan Promise and Miles Penn)	1	193+
13	CCK (Chris Brookes and Kid Lykos)	1	184
14	The Kings of Wrestling (Chris Hero and Claudio Castagnoli)	2	182
14	CMD (Boom Harden and Desean Pratt)	1	182
16	Scarlet and Graves (Dezmond Xavier and Zachary Wentz)	2	180
17	H8 Club (Justice Pain and Wifebeater)	1	179
18	Team Tremendous (Dan Barry and Big Bill Carr)	1	154
18	#TVReady (BLK Jeez and Pepper Parks)	1	154
18	Naptown Dragons (Dustin Lee and Scotty Vortekz)	1	154
18	H8 Club (Justice Pain and Nick Gage)	1	154
22	Juicy Product (J. T. Dunn and David Starr)	1	153
23	Post Game (Mike Walker and Vinny Tallota)	2	140
24	Team AnDrew (Andy Sumner and Drew Gulak)	2	126
24	2 Girls, 1 Cup (Beef Wellington and Greg Excellent)	2	126
24	Nation of Intoxication (Danny Havoc, Devon Moore and Lucky 13)	2	126
27	The Haas Brothers (Charlie Haas and Russ Haas)	1	119
28	The Beaver Boys (Alex Reynolds and John Silver)	1	106
29	The Briscoe Brothers (Jay Briscoe and Mark Briscoe)	2	105
30	Rivality (MBM and Ultima Sombra	1	98
30	The Brothers of East L.A. (Angel Vera and Bobby Muniz)	1	98
32	The Suicide Kings (Eddie Kingston and Drake Younger)	1	91
33	Rebel's Army (Derek Frazier, Greg Matthews and Rockin' Rebel)	1	77
33	John Zandig and Nick Gage	1	77
35	Danny Demanto and Jon Dahmer	1	63
35	VD (Eddie Valentine and Jon Dahmer)	1	63
35	Tough Crazy Bastards (Necro Butcher and Toby Klein)	1	63
38	Team Ca$h (Chri$ Ca$h, J. C. Bailey, Nate Webb, and SeXXXy Eddy)	1	56
38	Derek Frazier and Niles Young	1	56
38	Nick Mondo and Ric Blade	1	56
41	The Catalyst (Dustin Rayz and Eric Ryan)	1	55
42	Blackout (Onyx and Rainman)	1	35
43	The Thrill Kill Kult (Diablos Macabre and Midknight)	1	28
43	Extreme Fahrenheit (Heartbreaker and Mr. Motion)	1	28
43	BLK-OUT (Robbie Mireno and Sabian)	1	28
46	Lobo and T.C.K.	1	23¤
47	The King Pinz (Bill Schaffer and Jim Price)	1	7
47	The Kashmerinos (Johnny Kashmere and Robbie Mireno)	1	7
49	The House Of Gangone (Anthony Gangone and Amazing Red)	1	3
50	Jun Kasai and Men's Teioh	1	2
51	EYFBO (Angel Ortiz and Mike Dratzik)	1	<1
51	Jon Dahmer and Jose Rivera, Jr.	1	<1

=== By wrestler ===
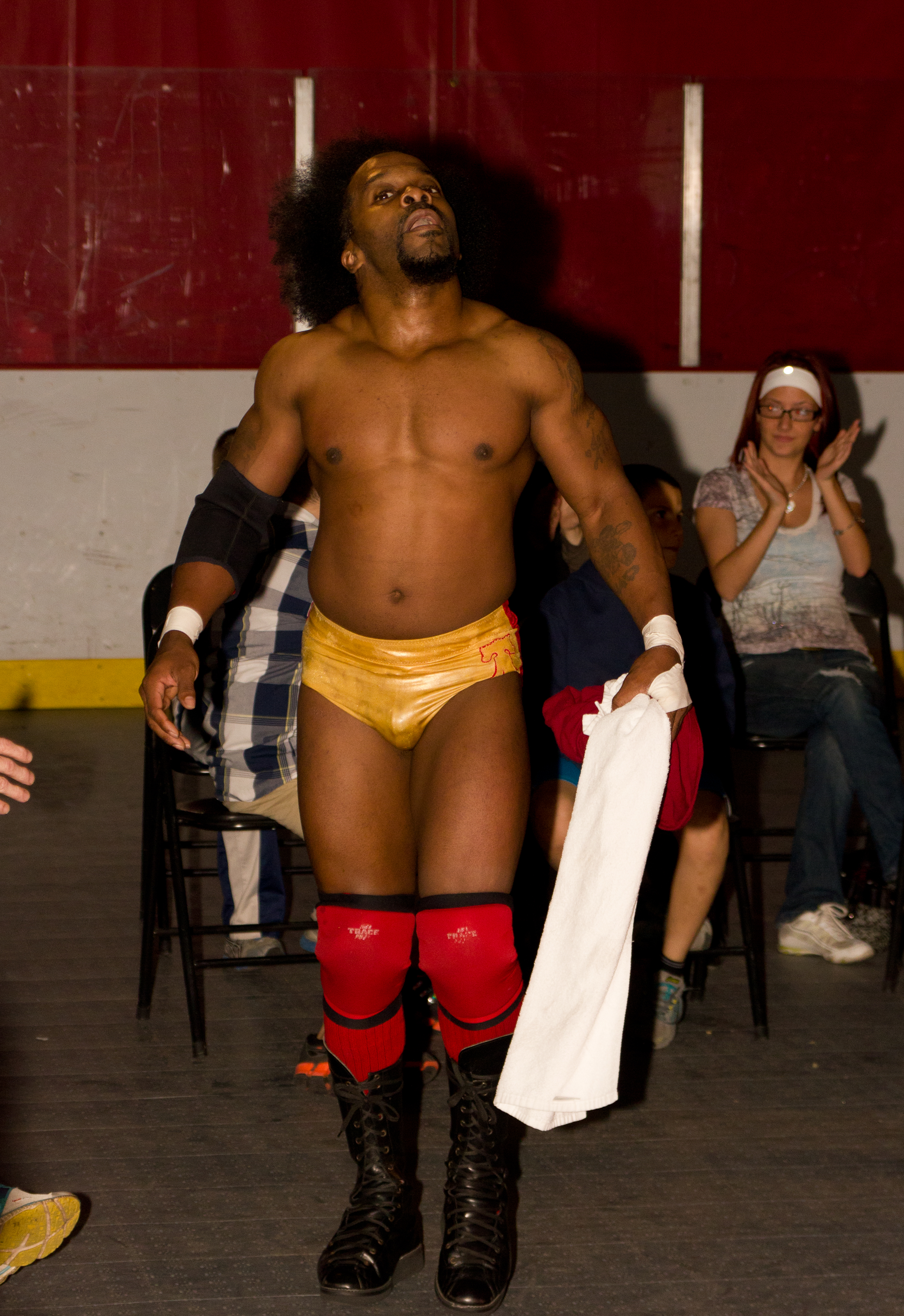
Sabian/BLK Jeez is the longest combined-reigning champion at 1,248 days and has the record for most championship reigns with nine.

Rank	Wrestler	No. of reigns	Combined days
1	Sabian/BLK Jeez	9	1,248
2	Boom Harden	1	1,323
2	Desean Pratt	1	1,323
4	Dave McCall	3	1,089¤
4	Nate Carter	3	1,089¤
6	Ruckus	5	821
7	Nick Gage	5	675
8	Johnny Kashmere	5	635
9	Trent Acid	3	628
10	Brandon Watts	1	538
10	Randy Summers	1	538
12	Joker	3	455
13	Nate Hatred	3	444
14	Bruce Maxwell	1	392
14	T.J. Cannon	1	392
16	Justice Pain	3	382
17	Azrieal	2	329
17	Bandido Jr.	2	329
19	Eddie Kingston	2	321
20	Dave Crist	1	287
20	Jake Crist	1	287
22	Dan Maff	1	210
22	Monsta Mack	1	210
24	Anthan Promise	1	193+
24	Miles Penn	1	193+
26	Chris Brookes	1	184
26	Kid Lykos	1	184
28	Chris Hero	2	182
28	Claudio Castagnoli	2	182
30	Dezmond Xavier	2	180
30	Zachary Wentz	2	180
32	Wifebeater	1	179
33	Bill Carr	1	154
33	Dan Barry	1	154
33	Dustin Lee	1	154
33	Pepper Parks	1	154
33	Scotty Vortekz	1	154
38	David Starr	1	153
38	J. T. Dunn	1	153
40	Derek Frazier	2	133
41	Jon Dahmer	3	126
41	Andy Sumner	2	126
41	Beef Wellington	2	126
41	Danny Havoc	2	126
41	Devon Moore	2	126
41	Drew Gulak	2	126
41	Greg Excellent	2	126
41	Lucky 13	2	126
49	Charlie Haas	1	119
49	Russ Haas	1	119
51	Alex Reynolds	1	106
51	John Silver	1	106
53	Jay Briscoe	2	105
53	Mark Briscoe	2	105
55	MBM	1	98
55	Ultima Sombra	1	98
57	Drake Younger	1	91
58	Greg Matthews	1	77
58	John Zandig	1	77
58	Rockin' Rebel	1	77
61	Danny Demanto	1	63
61	Eddie Valentine	1	63
61	Necro Butcher	1	63
61	Toby Klein	1	63
65	Chri$ Ca$h	1	56
65	J. C. Bailey	1	56
65	Nate Webb	1	56
65	Nick Mondo	1	56
65	Niles Young	1	56
65	Ric Blade	1	56
65	SeXXXy Eddy	1	56
72	Dustin Rayz	1	55
72	Eric Ryan	1	55
74	Robbie Mireno	2	35
74	Onyx	1	35
74	Rainman	1	35
77	Diablos Macabre	1	28
77	Heartbreaker	1	28
77	Midknight	1	28
77	Mr. Motion	1	28
81	Lobo	1	23¤
81	T.C.K.	1	23¤
83	Bill Schaffer	1	7
83	Jim Price	1	7
85	Anthony Gangone	1	3
85	Amazing Red	1	3
87	Jun Kasai	1	2
87	Men's Teioh	1	2
89	Angel Ortiz	1	<1
89	Jose Rivera, Jr.	1	<1
89	Mike Draztik	1	<1

== Notes ==
1. – It is unknown which day of the month the championship was vacated. The reign is thus marked as ending on the first day of November 1999.
2. – Each reign is ranked highest to lowest; reigns with the exact same number mean that they are tied for that certain rank.
