= CZW Cage of Death =

Combat Zone Wrestling professional wrestling event series

Cage of Death
- Promotions: Combat Zone Wrestling
- First event: Cage of Death I
- Signature matches: Cage of Death match

The Cage of Death is Combat Zone Wrestling's biggest show since 1999. It always features the Cage of Death match, a steel cage with various weapons littered in the cage. Electrified cage walls, cacti, tables, light tubes, glass, thumbtacks, baseball bats, barbed wire, fire and numerous other weapons and objects have been used in it. The first two matches were focused on either pinning and/or submitting to win cage matches with weapons littered in and around the cage. The Cage of Death also has different formats and stipulations: singles, tag team, or gauntlet. Each Cage of Death features two or more wrestlers in the cage. For Cage of Death 5, 6, and 7, WarGames stipulations were used.

== Events ==
#	Event	Date	City	Venue	Main Event
1	Cage of Death I	October 16, 1999	Mantua Township, New Jersey	Unknown	Lobo vs. Justice Pain in a Cage of Death match
2	Cage of Death II	September 9, 2000	Sewell, New Jersey	Unknown	Lobo vs. John Zandig versus Justice Pain
3	Cage of Death III	December 15, 2001	Philadelphia, Pennsylvania	ECW Arena	Wifebeater vs. Justice Pain in a Cage of Death
4	Cage of Death IV	December 12, 2002	Philadelphia, Pennsylvania	ECW Arena	Lobo vs. John Zandig
5	Cage of Death V: Suspended	December 13, 2003	Philadelphia, Pennsylvania	ECW Arena	John Zandig, Nick Gage, Ian Knoxx, Wifebeater, New Jack and Lobo vs. Adam Flash, Nate Hatred, The Backseat Boyz, The Messiah and B-Boy
6	Cage of Death VI	December 11, 2004	Philadelphia, Pennsylvania	Alhambra Arena	Nate Hatred and Nick Gage vs. Justice Pain and Wifebeater vs. Chri$ Ca$h, SeXXXy Eddy, J.C. Bailey and Nate Webb vs. Blackout
7	Cage of Death VII: Living in Sin	December 10, 2005	Philadelphia, Pennsylvania	Alhambra Arena	Joker, Necro Butcher & Toby Klein vs. John Zandig, Nick Gage and Justice Pain in a Cage of Death
8	Cage of Death VIII: Coming Undone	December 9, 2006	Philadelphia, Pennsylvania	Alhambra Arena	John Zandig vs. Nick Gage vs. Lobo vs. LuFisto in a Cage of Death
9	Cage of Death IX	December 15, 2007	Philadelphia, Pennsylvania	Alhambra Arena	Team CZW (Necro Butcher, Danny Havoc, Toby Klein and Drake Younger) vs. Team MBA (Brain Damage, Scotty Vortekz, Diehard Dustin Lee and D. J. Hyde) in a Cage of Death
10	Cage of Death X	December 13, 2008	Philadelphia, Pennsylvania	Alhambra Arena	Devon Moore vs. Sami Callihan vs. Drake Younger vs. Danny Havoc vs. John Zandig vs. Brain Damage in a Cage of Death
11	Cage of Death XI	December 12, 2009	Philadelphia, Pennsylvania	The Arena	Sami Callihan vs. Danny Havoc in a Cage of Death
12	Cage of Death XII	December 11, 2010	Philadelphia, Pennsylvania	Asylum Arena	Suicide Kings (Scotty Vortekz, Danny Havoc, Devon Moore and Dysfunction) vs. Cult Fiction (Masada, Brain Damage, tHURTeen and Drake Younger) in a Cage of Death
13	Cage of Death XIII	December 3, 2011	Philadelphia, Pennsylvania	Viking Hall	Devon Moore vs. Scotty Vortekz vs. Masada vs. Robert Anthony in a Cage of Death for the CZW World Heavyweight Championship
14	Cage of Death XIV	December 8, 2012	Voorhees Township, New Jersey	The Flyers Skate Zone	D. J. Hyde vs. Matt Tremont in a Cage of Death
15	Cage of Death XV	December 14, 2013	Voorhees Township, New Jersey	The Flyers Skate Zone	Nation of Intoxication vs. Forgotten Ones in a Cage of Death
16	Cage of Death XVI	December 13, 2014	Voorhees Township, New Jersey	The Flyers Skate Zone	Sozio vs. Drew Gulak vs. Biff Busick vs. BLK Jeez in a Cage of Death for the CZW World Heavyweight Championship
17	Cage of Death XVII	December 12, 2015	Voorhees Township, New Jersey	The Flyers Skate Zone	Matt Tremont vs. Masada vs. Devon Moore vs. A. R. Fox in a Cage of Death for the CZW World Heavyweight Championship
18	Cage of Death 18	December 10, 2016	Voorhees Township, New Jersey	The Flyers Skate Zone	Devon Moore, Drew Blood, Dale Patricks and Josh Crane vs. Matt Tremont, Joey Janela, Jeff Cannonball and Conor Claxton in a Cage Of Death
19	Cage of Death 19	December 9, 2017	Sewell, New Jersey	Rastelli Complex	Rickey Shane Page vs. Joe Gacy vs. Shane Strickland in a Cage of Death for the CZW World Heavyweight Championship
20	Cage of Death XX	December 9, 2018	Philadelphia, Pennsylvania	2300 Arena	Mance Warner vs. Rickey Shane Page in a Cage of Death for the vacant CZW World Heavyweight Championship
21	Cage of Death XXI	December 14, 2019	Voorhees Township, New Jersey	The Coliseum	Brandon Kirk vs. Jimmy Lloyd in a Cage of Death

== History ==
=== Cage of Death I ===
Cage of Death I
- Promotion: Combat Zone Wrestling
- Date: October 16, 1999
- City: Mantua Township, New Jersey
- Venue: CZW Arena

The first Cage Of Death was held on October 16, 1999, in Mantua Township, New Jersey, where Lobo defeated Justice Pain in the first Cage of Death match for the Iron Man title. The first Cage of Death that could be a separate built unit or put on a ring with the ropes taken down. Two parallel sides of the cage are made of steel chain link fencing and the two others are made of steel bars. Inside the cage, littered in a ring, and attached to cage walls are full of different weapons (barbed wire, glass panes, cacti, tables, ladders, light tubes, trash cans, etc.) There is a scaffold across the top of the cage and elevated barbed wire boards on the outside of the ring.

#	Result	Stipulation	
1	Jon Dahmer defeated Big Slam	Singles match	
2	Trent Acid vs. White Lotus ended in a draw.	Singles match	11:40
3	Trent Acid and White Lotus defeated Johnny Kashmere and Robbie Mireno	Tag team match	
4	Ric Blade (c) vs. Nick Gage ended in a draw.	Singles match for the CZW World Junior Heavyweight Championship	
5	TCK defeated Middknight	Singles match	
6	John Zandig vs. Wifebeater ended in a draw.	First Blood match	
7	Lobo defeated Justice Pain (c)	Cage of Death match to win the CZW Iron Man Championship	

=== Cage of Death II ===
Cage of Death II
- Promotion: Combat Zone Wrestling
- Date: September 9, 2000
- City: Sewell, New Jersey
- Venue: Outside of the Champs Soccer Arena

Cage of Death II took place in Sewell, New Jersey, on September 9, 2000. That night the Cage was host to two matches. In the first match, then CZW World champion Lobo defeated Zandig to retain his title. Big Japan Pro Wrestling (BJW) wrestler Ryuji Yamakawa had hit the ring during the match and Zandig (who had spent much time that year wrestling for BJW) had lost due to Yamakawa's interference. The second Cage of Death was same cage as Cage of Death but its explosively electrified.

#	Result	Stipulation
1	Nick Gage defeated Mad Man Pondo and Wifebeater	Triple Threat match
2	Ryuji Yamakawa defeated John Zandig	Singles match
3	Nate Hatred defeated Nick Berk	Singles match
4	Rockin' Rebel defeated Jon Dahmer	Singles match
5	Nick Mondo versus Trent Acid	Singles match
6	Lobo (c) defeated John Zandig	Cage of Death match to retain the CZW World Heavyweight Championship
7	Justice Pain defeated Lobo (c)	Cage of Death match to win the CZW World Heavyweight Championship

=== Cage of Death III ===
Cage of Death 3
- Promotion: Combat Zone Wrestling
- Date: December 15, 2001
- City: Philadelphia, Pennsylvania
- Venue: Viking Hall
- Attendance: 1,500

Cage of Death 3 was the third annual Cage of Death event produced by the Combat Zone Wrestling professional wrestling promotion. It took place on December 15, 2001. At the CZW Arena in Philadelphia, Pennsylvania. The event was at the first time in the CZW Arena.

Due to their upcoming annual COD show at the end of 2001, the company needed a bigger venue and made their debut in the ECW Arena, formerly Viking Hall and currently The Arena. The venue was the first sellout in the building since the era of ECW, and hundreds were turned away from the biggest show in the promotion's history.

Ty Street wrestled Mongoose to a no-contest. Jeff Rocker ran in and then Nate Hatred and Nick Gage came out and destroyed everyone. Nick Gage and Nate Hatred defeated a masked team suspiciously looking like Jay and Mark Briscoe (who wrestled under masks presumably to get around the selectively enforced Pennsylvania age restrictions). NWA Southwest workers Joey Corman defeated Samir and Brad Michaels in a 3-Way Dance. Corman pinned Michaels after hitting the spin doctor. In what had been billed as a match with Zandig and Glen Osbourne; Osbourne, Lobo, and Danny Rose all got involved in a big brawl with Zandig until Greg from Tough Enough made the save.

In an elimination match, The S.A.T. defeated Chris Divine, Quiet Storm and Brian XL (with Pastor Jim). The stipulation for the match was if Divine, Storm, and XL lose the match, Pastor Jim was out of CZW for good. The order of elimination: Joel Maximo (by Divine), Divine (by Jose Maximo), Jose Maximo (by XL), Brian XL (by Red), Quiet Storm (by Amazing Red, after the Spanish Fly by the Maximos and the Infrared Splash).

Jon Dahmer and Fast Eddie Valentine defeated Chri$ Ca$h & GQ. Trent Acid defeated Ruckus to win the CZW/BJW Junior Heavyweight Championship. Initially, both men were counted out, but the match was restarted by John Zandig with a ladder involved. Acid won the match with the Yakuza Kick, but was put through a table by Big Japan's Winger, who then walked off with both belts. Johnny Kashmere defeated Menace with the Cradlebreaker. Mad Man Pondo defeated Z-Barr – The returning Pondo got the pin after hitting Barr with a splash on top of a chair and his patented Stop Sign. Adam Flash defeated Nick Berk and Nick Mondo in a Falls Count Anywhere match to win the CZW Iron Man Championship.

Inside the Cage of Death, were a jackhammer, a cactus, garbage cans, a truck hood, and tables; and was topped by a scaffold. Justice Pain defeated Wifebeater to retain the CZW World Heavyweight Title as both men crashed through tables in the ring off of the scaffold that topped of the cage of death.

As the match finished, the Arena lights went out. In a kayfabe angle, former ECW owner Tod Gordon, along with The Blue Meanie, Pitbull #1, Rockin' Rebel and Rocco Rock were in the ring, trashed CZW, with Gordon calling the fans "ingrates" for chanting CZW. After they abused Justice Pain and Wifebeater, the CZW locker room crashed the cage, and the lights went out again. When they came back on, The Sandman was standing in the middle of the ring.

Sandman then turned on his former ECW compatriots. At the end Sandman stripped off his ECW T-shirt for a CZW shirt and had a beer with John Zandig.

#	Result	Stipulation
Dark	Ty Street vs Fake Ty Street went to contest	Singles match
2	The H8 Club (Nate Hatred and Nick Gage) defeated Jay Briscoe and Mark Briscoe	Tag team match
3	Joey Corman defeated Samir and Brad Michaels	Triple Threat match
4	John Zandig and Danny Rose went to a no contest	Singles match
5	The S.A.T. (Joel Maximo, Jose Maximo and Will Maximo) defeated Chris Divine, Quiet Storm and Brian XL (with Pastor Jim)	Six man tag team match – Pastor Jim's Career in CZW on the line
6	Jon Dahmer and Fast Eddie Valentine defeated Chri$ Ca$h and GQ and Chris Stylz and Ian Knoxx	Three-way tag team match
7	Trent Acid defeated Ruckus (c)	Title unification match for the CZW/BJW Junior Heavyweight Championships
8	Johnny Kashmere defeated Menace	Singles match
9	Mad Man Pondo defeated Z-Barr	Hardcore match
10	Adam Flash defeated Nick Berk (c) and Nick Mondo	Triple Threat Falls Count Anywhere match to win the CZW Iron Man Championship
11	Justice Pain (c) defeated Wifebeater	Cage of Death match to retain the CZW World Heavyweight Championship

=== Cage of Death IV ===
Cage of Death IV
- Promotion: Combat Zone Wrestling
- Date: December 13, 2002
- City: Philadelphia, Pennsylvania
- Venue: ECW Arena

Cage of Death IV took place on December 13, 2002, in Philadelphia, Pennsylvania at the Viking Hall and saw John Zandig defeat Lobo in a Cage of Death match for the ownership of CZW. This was the last Cage Of Death to use electricity as a hazard (Lobo was electrocuted early in the match).

#	Result	Stipulation
1	John Zandig defeated Lobo	Cage of Death
2	Chri$ Ca$h, Danny Rose, GQ, Greg Matthews and Rockin' Rebel defeated Adam Flash, Chris Stylz, Derek Frazier, Ian Knoxx and Jon Dahmer	Ten-man tag team match
3	Z-Barr defeated Rick Feinburg and Hurricane Kid	Handicap match
4	Nick Berk defeated Josh Prohibition	Submission match
5	Sonjay Dutt defeated Ruckus and M-Dogg 20	Triple threat number one contenders match for the CZW World Junior Heavyweight Championship
6	The H8 Club (Nick Gage and Nate Hatred) (c) defeated B-Boy and Chris Hero	Tag team match for the CZW World Tag Team Championship
7	The Backseat Boyz (Johnny Kashmere and Trent Acid) defeated Nick Mondo and Ric Blade	Tag team Tables, Ladders and Chairs match
8	The Messiah defeated Justice Pain (c)	Singles match for the CZW World Heavyweight Championship

=== Cage of Death V: Suspended ===
Cage of Death V: Suspended
- Promotion: Combat Zone Wrestling
- Date: December 13, 2003
- City: Philadelphia, Pennsylvania
- Venue: Viking Hall

Cage of Death V: Suspended was the fifth annual Cage of Death event produced by the Combat Zone Wrestling professional wrestling promotion. It took place on December 13, 2003.

The main feud going into the Cage of Death match was between Team Zandig (John Zandig, Nick Gage, Ian Knoxx, Wifebeater, and Lobo) and the HI-V (The Messiah, Adam Flash, Nate Hatred, Trent Acid, Johnny Kashmere, and B-Boy). Although Team Zandig's sixth member was New Jack, he turned on Team Zandig and joined the HI-V. The Cage match also differed from the previous year, in that there were two rings; one of them was surrounded by the cage, and the other was filled with thumbtacks (which in kayfabe storyline was claimed to be "one million"). Above the two rings was scaffolding walkway on which the wrestlers could walk on. The match started with two members of each team, and every 90 seconds a wrestler, from either team, entered the match according to the number they drew before the match started. Elimination occurred when both a wrestlers' feet hit the floor.

#	Result	Stipulation
Dark	Jon Dahmer and Cory Kastle defeated Jude and Niles Young, and D. J. Hyde and Josh Samuels	Six man tag team match
Dark	Shun the Kabuki Kid defeated Christian Wolf, GQ and Rick Feinberg	Four-way match
1	Greg Matthews and Rockin' Rebel defeated Dirty Rotten Scoundrelz, Nick Berk, and Z-Barr	Six-man tag team match
2	Jimmy Jacobs (with Becky Bayless) defeated Derek Frazier and Sabian	Triple Threat match
3	Jimmy Rave defeated Trent Acid (c)	Iron Man match for the CZW Iron Man Championship
4	Alex Shelley defeated B-Boy and Chris Hero	Triple threat number one contenders match
5	The Joker defeated Chri$ Ca$h	Ladder match
6	Sonjay Dutt defeated Ruckus (c)	Singles match for the CZW World Junior Heavyweight Championship
7	Team Ultraviolence (Ian Knoxx, John Zandig, Lobo, New Jack, Nick Gage and Wifebeater) defeated Hi-V (Adam Flash, B-Boy, The Backseat Boyz (Johnny Kashmere and Trent Acid), The Messiah and Nate Hatred)	Cage of Death WarGames elimination deathmatch

=== Cage of Death VI ===
Cage of Death VI
- Promotion: Combat Zone Wrestling
- Date: December 11, 2004
- City: Philadelphia, Pennsylvania
- Venue: Viking Hall

Cage of Death VI took place on December 11, 2004, in the ECW Arena where there were two Cage Of Death matches. One saw Team Ca$h (Chri$ Ca$h, J.C. Bailey, Nate Webb, and SeXXXy Eddy) defeat Team Blackout (Ruckus, Sabian, Eddie Kingston, and Jack Evans). The other match saw the battle of The H8 Club as Wifebeater and Justice Pain took on Nate Hatred and Nick Gage. For Cage of Death 6 there were eliminations that would happen when a wrestler would hit the arena floor much like Cage of Death 5 the year before, the difference being that the tag team titles were hanging on a scaffold stretched across the length of the top of the cage overlooking the two rings.

In the 4 on 4 WarGames elimination match, wrestlers were eliminated when they hit the floor. The cage surrounded two rings, weapons littered around two rings, and there was also a scaffold on top of the cage where Maven Bentley and Robbie Mireno were holding the CZW Tag Team belts.

The other Cage of Death match was a Fans Bring the Weapons match inside the cage. Wifebeater and Justice Pain won after Nick Gage turned on Nate Hatred by driving him through a pane of glass covered in salt and thumbtacks. Immediately after the match Pain and Gage turned on Wifebeater.

#	Result	Stipulation	Time
1	Derek Frazier won a CZW Student Battle Royal	Battle royal	14:23
2	Kid Kamikaze (with Elsa Bangz) defeated Beef Wellington	Singles match	6:03
3	Dizzie, All Money is Legal (K-Murda and K-Pusha) defeated Ghost Shadow, Heretic and Spyral BKNY	Six man tag team match	10:40
3	Erick Stevens and Roderick Strong defeated Alex Shelley and Jonny Storm	Tag team match	13:22
4	Blackjack Marsciano, Hallowicked and Larry Sweeney defeated Gran Akuma, Jigsaw and Mike Quackenbush	Six-man tag team match	7:50
5	Sonjay Dutt (c) defeated M-Dogg 20 for the CZW World Junior Heavyweight Championship	"Loser Leaves CZW" match	17:58
6	B-Boy defeated Dan Maff	Singles match	12:34
7	B-Boy defeated Chris Hero (c) for the CZW Iron Man Championship	Singles match	8:07
8	S.B.S. (Excalibur and Super Dragon) defeated El Generico and Kevin Steen	Tag-team match	18:44
9	The Messiah (c) defeated Adam Flash and Kaos	Three way scaffold and ladder match for the CZW World Heavyweight Championship	19:12
10	Team Ca$h (Chri$ Ca$h, J.C. Bailey, Nate Webb and SeXXXy Eddy) defeated The Blackout (Eddie Kingston, Jack Evans, Ruckus and Sabian)	WarGames Cage of Death elimination deathmatch for the CZW World Tag Team Champions	35:47
11	H8 Club (Justice Pain and Wifebeater) defeated The H8 Club (Nate Hatred and Nick Gage)	Fans Bring the Weapons Cage of Death deathmatch	12:48

=== Cage of Death VII: Living in Sin ===
Cage of Death VII: Living in Sin
- Promotion: Combat Zone Wrestling
- Date: December 10, 2005
- City: Philadelphia, Pennsylvania
- Venue: Viking Hall

Cage Of Death VII took place on December 10, 2005, in Philadelphia, Pennsylvania, at the New Alhambra Arena, where H8 Club & John Zandig defeated The Tough Crazy Bastards (Necro Butcher and Toby Klein), and Joker. This Cage of Death was the large eight-sided cage that surrounds the entire ringside area with a barbed-wire spider net set up on one side and glass set up on another side with tables underneath and two scaffold platforms across the ring from each other. Hardcore and extreme wrestling weapons such as thumbtack turnbuckles, barbed wire bats, staple guns, light tubes, barbed wire, and others littered around for wrestlers to use. This show is also notable for an incident where a fan was heard heckling during a ten bell salute for Eddie Guerrero who died less than a month prior to the event.

#	Result	Stipulation
1	Cheech defeated Cloudy	Singles match
2	Jigsaw, Mike Quackenbush and Shane Storm defeated Gran Akuma, Hallowicked, and Icarus	Six Man tag team match
3	D. J. Hyde defeated Jon Dahmer	Singles match
4	Franky The Mobster and Larry Sweeney defeated Beef Wellington and Excalibur	Tag team match
5	Joey Ryan (c) defeated El Generico	Singles match for the PWG World Championship
6	Adam Flash and Sonjay Dutt defeated Nate Webb and SeXXXy Eddy	Tag team match
7	Derek Frazier (c) defeated Niles Young	Two out of three falls TLC match for the CZW World Junior Heavyweight Championship
8	The Kings of Wrestling (Chris Hero and Claudio Castagnoli) (c) defeated The Blackout (Eddie Kingston and Sabian)	Tag team match for the CZW World Tag Team Championship
9	Kevin Steen (c) defeated Chris Sabin	Singles match for the CZW Iron Man Championship
10	Super Dragon defeated Ruckus (c)	Singles match for the CZW World Heavyweight Championship
11	The H8 Club (Justice Pain and Nick Gage) and John Zandig defeated Joker and The Tough Crazy Bastards (Necro Butcher and Toby Klein)	Six man Tag Team Cage of Death WarGames deathmatch

=== Cage of Death VIII: Coming Undone ===
Cage of Death VIII: Coming Undone
- Promotion: Combat Zone Wrestling
- Date: December 9, 2006
- City: Philadelphia, Pennsylvania
- Venue: Viking Hall

Cage of Death VIII took place on December 9, 2006, where in a Loser Must Retire Fans Bring the Weapons Cage of Death match, Nick Gage pinned John Zandig in a four way that also involved Lobo and LuFisto (in a last minute addition). The cage was an all new design made of wood and barbed wire featuring platforms, barbed wire spider nets, glass, barbed wire-wrapped baseball bats, and all other different assorted weapons. This was the first ever four way Fans Bring The Weapons Cage of Death deathmatch, and the first one with a female participant.

#	Result	Stipulation
1	Chuck Taylor, Gran Akuma, Icarus and Max Boyer defeated Beef Wellington, Ricochet, Niles Young and Player Uno	Eight-man tag team match
2	Andy Sumner and Drew Gulak defeated New Jersey All-Stars (JC Ryder and Mr. Lucky)	Tag team match
3	Mana the Polynesian Warrior defeated D. J. Hyde	Singles match
4	Cloudy defeated Cheech	Falls Count Anywhere match
5	Blackout (Onyx and Rainman) defeated The Blackout (Robbie Mireno and Sabian) (c)	Tag team match for the CZW World Tag Team Championship
6	Hallowicked defeated SeXXXy Eddy	Singles match
7	Ruckus defeated Human Tornado	Singles match
8	Adam Flash, B-Boy and The Messiah defeated Danny Havoc, LuFisto and Luke Hawx	Six man tag team match
9	Drake Younger (c) defeated Necro Butcher	Singles match for the CZW Ultraviolent Underground Championship
10	Justice Pain defeated Chris Hero and Eddie Kingston (c)	Triple threat match for the CZW World Heavyweight Championship
11	Nick Gage defeated John Zandig, Lobo and LuFisto	Fatal four-way Loser Must Retire Fans Bring the Weapons Cage of Death deathmatch

=== Cage of Death IX ===
Cage of Death IX
- Promotion: Combat Zone Wrestling
- Date: December 8, 2007
- City: Philadelphia, Pennsylvania
- Venue: Viking Hall

Event chronology
← Previous; Night of Infamy 6	Next → New Year's Resolutions

Cage of Death IX was the ninth annual Cage of Death event produced by the Combat Zone Wrestling professional wrestling promotion. It took place on December 8, 2007, at the CZW Arena in Philadelphia, Pennsylvania. The event was the seventh consecutive Cage of Death at the CZW Arena.

#	Result	Stipulation
1	2 Girls, 1 Cup (Beef Wellington and Greg Excellent) and L.J. Cruz defeated GNC (Alex Colon and Joe Gacy) and Nicky Benz	Six-man tag team match
2	The H8 Club (Nick Gage and Justice Pain and Nate Hatred) defeated The Miracle Ultraviolence Connection (Brodie Lee, Cheech and Cloudy)	Six man tag team match
3	Sabian (c) defeated LuFisto	Singles match for the CZW World Junior Heavyweight Championship
4	Danny Demanto and Jon Dahmer defeated Derek Frazier and Niles Young (c)	Tag team match for the CZW World Tag Team Championship
5	Lobo defeated Maven Bentley	Lumberjack strap match
6	Nick Gage defeated The Messiah and Ruckus (c)	Three-way dance for the CZW World Heavyweight Championship
7	WHACKS defeated SeXXXy Eddy and Viking	Elimination tables match
8	Mitch Ryder defeated Chuey Martinez	Fans Bring the Weapons match
9	Team CZW (Danny Havoc, Drake Younger, Necro Butcher and Toby Klein) (with Halfbreed Billy Gram) defeated Team MBA (Brain Damage, D. J. Hyde, Dustin Lee and Scotty Vortekz)	Cage of Death

=== Cage of Death X ===
CZW Cage of Death X
- Promotion: Combat Zone Wrestling
- Date: December 13, 2008
- City: Philadelphia, Pennsylvania
- Venue: Viking Hall
- Attendance: 1,200

Cage of Death X was the tenth annual Cage of Death event produced by the Combat Zone Wrestling professional wrestling promotion. It took place on December 13, 2008, at the CZW Arena in Philadelphia, Pennsylvania. The event was the eighth consecutive Cage of Death at the CZW Arena.

The show opened with a surprise as old CZW favorite Ric Blade came back to the promotion for his first in-ring appearance since 2004, as the referee for the Junior Heavyweight Title Match. The roof for the Cage of Death hung from the ceiling. Also hanging from the ceiling were the tables, ladders, chairs, ropes, rope ladders, and the CZW Junior Heavyweight Title.

In the main event, Ryan McBride defeated Pinkie Sanchez, IWS regular Dan Paysan, Insanity Pro Wrestling's Carter Gray, and All-American Wrestling/IWA Mid-South Wrestling's Egotistico Fantastico in a ladder match to become the new CZW World Junior Heavyweight Champion. The finish saw Pinkie Sanchez and Ryan McBride duelling on a ladder to claim the belt, in which both wrestlers were knocked off hitting the mat, but with McBride managing to retain possession of the belt to win the championship.

Post-match, John Zandig brought out Lobo, Nick Gage, and Wifebeater to the ring to join Ric Blade, and credited them for being the reason why CZW still existed. Then New Alhambra Arena manager Roger Artigiani surprised Zandig by unveiling the 2008 New Alhambra Arena Hardcore Hall of Fame induction banner on the wall joining The Sandman, Terry Funk, Ted "Rocco Rock" Petty and Johnny Grunge as inductees. A video promo followed, with Zandig stating that, "if these five men want the $10,000...they'll have to go through me" – making Zandig the sixth man in the Cage of Death.

The promotion conducted its third annual Toys for Tots program, where uniformed Marines attended a collection box situated at the front entrance. Fans were encouraged to bring a new "unwrapped" toy to the Arena for donation to the children of the local Philadelphia area. Toys continued to be collected during the afternoon's CHIKARA and Velocity Pro Wrestling events.

In a pleasant surprise, Sonjay Dutt plugged CZW after the match and suggested he might return as he could in 2009 (with everyone waiting for the expected heel swerve that for once wasn't forced on by a promoter). 2 Girls, 1 Cup defeated The Olsens, Miracle Ultraviolence Connection, and Team Andrew to retain the CZW Tag Team Titles. Given Nick Gage's concussion at the time, expectations for this match weren't what they might have been under other circumstances. Gage won the match for H8 Club, as he hammered Ruckus at the end with at least 7 Chokebreakers at the end of the match. Ruckus was ruled unable to continue by the referee. Deranged defeated D. J. Hyde in a Fans Bring the Weapons Match. Various toys used included a glass picture frame, a drum, a boat oar with thumb tacks, hand held plastic guitar, and a knife.

The Cage of Death was a double cage structure with a four-sided steel wired cage inside the large four-sided wooden cage, a roof made up of a barbed wire spider net, wooden boards, and a scaffold topping the traditional four-sided original Cage of Death. Surrounding the Cage that surrounded the Cage-enclosed ring was a platform surrounding that with tables, chairs, lemon juice, salt, ladders, sheets of auto glass and other different goodies enclosed by a large second four-sided wooden cage. In the middle of That platform was a vertical wall of glass which exploded after Devon Moore took a "Mother F'n Bomb" through it. Other sick spots saw Devon Moore doing a shooting star press onto all but Zandig, Sami Callihan hitting a senton off the scaffold/spidernet through a barbed wire table on Brain Damage, and Drake Younger Russian leg sweeping Danny Havoc off the side of the cage through a barbed wire board propped up by chairs. In the end, Zandig got to the top of the structure to win the match. After the match, Zandig stated that he was trying to prove that "his boys" had their Onita style "fighting spirit" back, and handed out the $10,000 to all five other competitors.

#	Result	Stipulation
0	Ryan McBride defeated Egotistico Fantastico, Don Paysan, Quick Carter Gray and Pinkie Sanchez	Sky Is Limit Ultraviolent Tables, Ladders, and Chairs Match for the CZW World Junior Heavyweight Championship with Ric Blade as referee
1	Jon Dahmer defeated Shun The Kabuki Kid	Singles match
2	Adam Cole, L.J. Cruz and Tyler Veritas defeated GNC (Alex Colon, E.M.O. and Joe Gacy)	Six man tag team match
3	B-Boy defeated Sonjay Dutt	Singles match
4	2 Girls, 1 Cup (Beef Wellington and Greg Excellent) defeated The Olsen Twins (Colin Olsen and Jimmy Olsen), The Miracle Ultraviolence Connection (Cheech and Cloudy), and Team AnDrew (Andy Sumner and Drew Gulak)	Four-way tag team match for the CZW World Tag Team Championship
5	H8 Club (Nate Hatred and Nick Gage) defeated The Blackout (Ruckus and Sabian)	Tag team match
6	Deranged (with Halfbreed Billy Gram) defeated D. J. Hyde	Deathmatch
7	John Zandig defeated Brain Damage (with Halfbreed Billy Gram), Danny Havoc, Devon Moore, Drake Younger and Sami Callihan	Cage of Death

=== Cage of Death XI ===
Cage of Death XI
- Promotion: Combat Zone Wrestling
- Date: December 8, 2009
- City: Philadelphia, Pennsylvania
- Venue: Viking Hall

Event chronology
← Previous; Night of Infamy 8	Next → High Stakes IV

Cage of Death XI was the eleventh annual Cage of Death event produced by the Combat Zone Wrestling professional wrestling promotion. It took place on December 8, 2009, at the CZW Arena in Philadelphia, Pennsylvania. The event was the ninth consecutive Cage of Death at the CZW Arena.

#	Match	Stipulations	Time
Dark	Ryan Slater defeated Alex Colon, Drew Gulak, Joe Gacy, L.J. Cruz and Rich Swann	Six way scramble	n/a
Dark	Jon Dahmer defeated Ryan McBride	Singles match	n/a
CZW Wired TV	Tyler Veritas defeated Adam Cole to become the first ever CZW Wired TV Champion	Singles match	n/a
1	Thumbtack Jack defeated Nick Gage	No Ropes Barbed Wire match for the CZW Ultraviolent Underground Championship	23:28
2	D. J. Hyde defeated Nate Hatred	Singles match	11:27
3	BLKOUT (Ruckus and Sabian) defeated Team MackTion (Kirby Mack and T.J. Mack), Naptown Dragons (Scotty Vortekz and xOMGx) and Azrieal and Bandito Jr.	Four-way tag match	10:43
4	Greg Excellent defeated Drew Blood (c)	Singles match for the CZW World Junior Heavyweight Championship	6:34
5	Jon Moxley defeated B-Boy, Eddie Kingston and Egotistico Fantastico	Fatal four-way	15:05
6	The Best Around (TJ Cannon and Bruce Maxwell) (c) defeated BLKOUT (Ruckus and Sabian)	Tag team match to retain the CZW World Tag Team Championship	14:19
7	Drake Younger (c) defeated Devon Moore	Singles match to retain the CZW World Heavyweight Championship	13:37
8	Sami Callihan defeated Danny Havoc	Electrified Barbed Wire Cage of Death	20:55

=== Cage of Death XII ===
Cage of Death XII
- Promotion: Combat Zone Wrestling
- Date: December 11, 2010
- City: Philadelphia, Pennsylvania
- Venue: Viking Hall

Event chronology
← Previous; Night of Infamy 9: Betrayal	Next → From Small Beginnings... Comes Great Things

Cage of Death XII was the twelfth annual Cage of Death event produced by the Combat Zone Wrestling professional wrestling promotion. It took place on December 11, 2010, at the CZW Arena in Philadelphia, Pennsylvania. The event was the tenth consecutive Cage of Death at the CZW Arena.

#	Match	Stipulations	Time
1	AKUMA defeated Alex Colon, Jonathan Gresham, Ryan McBride, Ruckus and Rich Swann	Six way scramble	6:50
2	Robert Anthony defeated Sami Callihan	Singles match	13:34
3	Adam Cole (with Mia Yim) defeated A. R. Fox to retain CZW World Junior Heavyweight Championship	Singles match	8:12
4	Adam Cole defeated Tyler Veritas to retain CZW World Junior Heavyweight Championship	Singles match	3:22
5	Philly's Most Wanted (Joker and Sabian) (c) defeated The Osirian Portal (Amasis and Ophidian)	Tag team match for the CZW World Tag Team Championship	17:36
6	Jon Moxley (c) defeated Homicide	Singles match for the CZW World Heavyweight Championship	11:23
7	Yuko Miyamoto defeated Nick Gage (with Dewey Donovan) (c)	Singles match for the CZW Ultraviolent Underground Championship	20:50
8	Suicide Kings (Danny Havoc, Devon Moore, Dysfunction and Scotty Vortekz) defeated Drake Younger and Cult Fiction (Brain Damage, MASADA and tHURTeen) (with Halfbreed Billy Gram)	Four-on-four Cage of Death	26:15

=== Cage of Death XIII ===
Cage of Death XIII
- Promotion: Combat Zone Wrestling
- Date: December 3, 2011
- City: Philadelphia, Pennsylvania
- Venue: Viking Hall

#	Match	Stipulations	Time
1	Jake Crist defeated Dave Crist	Singles match for the CZW Wired Championship	5:23
2	BLKOUT (Alex Colon, Chrissy Rivera and Ruckus) defeated The Runaways (Joe Gacy, Kimber Lee and Ryan Slater)	Two out of three falls intergender tag team tables match	10:39
3	Drew Gulak defeated Alex Payne, Derek Frazier, Dustin Rayz, Ryan McBride and tHURTeen	Six-way match	10:00
4	Drake Younger defeated Rory Mondo	Four Corners of Pain match	12:16
5	Danshoku Dino, Kengo Mashimo, Kudo, Ryuji Ito and Takashi Sasaki defeated Jaki Numazawa, Jun Kasai, Kamui, Masahiro Takanashi and Yoshihito Sasaki	Ten man tag team match	9:22
6	Eddie Kingston and Homicide wrestled Philly's Most Wanted (Joker and Sabian) to a no contest	Tag team match	18:53
7	Sami Callihan (c) defeated A. R. Fox	Singles match for the CZW World Junior Heavyweight Championship	21:13
8	Matt Tremont defeated Danny Havoc	Ultraviolent Thumbtack Pit & Nail Board Death Match Trial	20:11
9	Greg Excellent defeated D. J. Hyde	Singles match	8:49
10	Devon Moore (c) defeated Masada, Robert Anthony and Scotty Vortekz	Cage of Death match for the CZW World Heavyweight Championship	20:35

=== Cage of Death XIV ===
Cage of Death XIV
- Promotion: Combat Zone Wrestling
- Date: December 8, 2012
- City: Voorhees Township, New Jersey
- Venue: The Flyers Skate Zone

Cage of Death XIV was the fourteenth annual Cage of Death event produced by the Combat Zone Wrestling professional wrestling promotion. It took place on December 8, 2012, at the Flyers Skate Zone in Voorhees Township, New Jersey. The main event was Matt Tremont vs CZW Owner D. J. Hyde in the Cage of Death. Special appearances by New Jack and Colt Cabana happened starting with New Jack putting over CZW and hyping his match against BLKOUT at Extreme Rising on December 29, and Colt Cabanas' first CZW appearance to challenge Greg Excellent.

No.	Results	Stipulations	Time
1	The Nation of Intoxication (Danny Havoc, Devon Moore and Lucky 13) defeated 4Loco (Alex Colon, Azrieal (c) and Bandido, Jr. (c))	Six-Man Tag Team Aerial Assault match for the CZW World Tag Team Championship	13:57
2	Rich Swann defeated Shane Strickland	Singles match	13:38
3	Greg Excellent and Mother Excellent defeated Drew Gulak and Kimber Lee	Intergender Tag Team match	10:47
4	Adam Cole defeated Sami Callihan	CZW Rules match	13:34
5	Ohio is for Killers (Dave Crist and Jake Crist) (with Nevaeh) wrestled BLKOUT (BLK Jeez and Ruckus) (with Robbie Mireno) to a no contest	Tag Team match	n/a
6	A. R. Fox (c) defeated Robert Anthony	Singles match for the CZW Wired Championship	25:33
7	Masada (c) defeated Drake Younger	Singles match for the CZW World Heavyweight Championship	17:41
8	Matt Tremont defeated D. J. Hyde	Cage of Death match	22:35

=== Cage of Death XV ===
Cage of Death XV
- Promotion: Combat Zone Wrestling
- Date: December 14, 2013
- City: Voorhees Township, New Jersey
- Venue: The Flyers Skate Zone

Cage of Death XV was the fifteenth annual Cage of Death event produced by the Combat Zone Wrestling professional wrestling promotion. It took place on December 14, 2013, at the Flyers Skate Zone in Voorhees Township, New Jersey.

No.	Results	Stipulations	Time
1	Drew Gulak (c) defeated Chris Hero	Singles match for the CZW World Heavyweight Championship	22:04
2	Joe Gacy defeated Andrew Everett, A. R. Fox, Azrieal, Chuck Taylor and Tony Nese	Six-way match	10:53
3	Greg Excellent (with Mama Excellent) defeated Freight Train (with Cherry Bomb)	Singles match	7:20
4	BLKOUT (BLK Jeez and Ruckus) (c) defeated Juicy Product (J. T. Dunn and David Starr)	Tag team match	9:22
5	Kimber Lee defeated Christina Von Eerie	Singles match	4:35
6	Beaver Boys (Alex Reynolds and Johnny Silver) defeated The Colony (Fire Ant and Green Ant)	Tag team match	11:49
7	Chris Dickinson defeated Davey Richards	Singles match	17:02
8	Ohio is 4 Killers (Dave Crist, Jake Crist and Nevaeh) defeated D. J. Hyde and The Front (Biff Busick and Sozio)	Six-person tag team match	14:14
9	Alex Colon defeated Shane Strickland (c)	Singles match for the CZW Wired Championship	13:53
10	Nation of Intoxication (Danny Havoc, Devon Moore, Lucky 13 and Sick Nick Mondo) defeated the Forgotten Ones (Drew Blood, Matt Tremont, Ron Mathis and Rory Mondo)	Cage of Death match	30:15

=== Cage of Death XVI ===
Cage of Death XVI
- Promotion: Combat Zone Wrestling
- Date: December 13, 2014
- City: Voorhees Township, New Jersey
- Venue: The Flyers Skate Zone

Cage of Death XVI was the sixteenth annual Cage of Death event produced by the Combat Zone Wrestling professional wrestling promotion. It took place on December 13, 2014, at the Flyers Skate Zone in Voorhees Township, New Jersey.

No.	Results	Stipulations	Time
1	Chris Dickinson defeated D. J. Hyde	Singles match	12:45
2	Papadon and Pepper Parks (with Cherry Bomb) defeated The Nation Of Intoxication (Devon Moore and Lucky 13)	Tag team match	5:20
3	The Beaver Boys (Alex Reynolds and John Silver) defeated Team Tremendous (Bill Carr and Dan Barry) (with Dick Justice)	Tag team match	14:02
4	Joe Gacy defeated Shane Strickland (c) for the CZW Wired Championship	Singles match for the CZW Wired Championship	18:42
5	Greg Excellent and SeXXXy Eddy (with Chrissy Rivera and Mama Excellent) defeated Buxx Belmar and Matt Tremont	Tag team Ultraviolent Food Fight	16:35
6	Jonathan Gresham defeated Alex Colon, A. R. Fox, Caleb Konley, David Starr and "Speedball" Mike Bailey in a CZW Best of the Best Tournament Qualifying Scramble match	Scramble match	13:08
7	Alexander James (c) defeated Rich Swann	Singles match for the CZW Junior Heavyweight Championship	10:08
8	OI4K (Dave Crist and Jake Crist) (c) defeat The American Wolves (Davey Richards and Eddie Edwards) to retain the CZW World Tag Team Championship	Tag team match for the CZW World Tag Team Championship	15:53
9	BLK Jeez defeated Sozio (c), Biff Busick and Drew Gulak	Four way Cage of Death match for the CZW World Heavyweight Championship	38:25

=== Cage of Death XVII ===
Cage of Death XVII
- Promotion: Combat Zone Wrestling
- Date: December 12, 2015
- City: Voorhees Township, New Jersey
- Venue: The Flyers Skate Zone

Cage of Death XVII was the seventeenth annual Cage of Death event produced by the Combat Zone Wrestling professional wrestling promotion. It took place on December 12, 2015, at the Flyers Skate Zone in Voorhees Township, New Jersey.

No.	Results	Stipulations	Time
1	Dezmond Xavier defeated Poseidon, Chip Day, Eddie Smooth, Conor Claxton, Lucky 13 & Brittany Blake	Best of the Best Tournament Spot	32:32
2	Lio Rush defeated Joey Janela (c)	CZW Wired Championship	26:00
3	The Amazing Gulaks (Drew Gulak and Rory Gulak) defeated The Beaver Boys (Alex Reynolds and John Silver)	Tag Team Match	22:00
4	Greg Excellent defeated Tony Nese	Singles Match	17:45
5	George Gatton defeated D. J. Hyde	Singles Match	12:06
6	TV Ready (BLK Jeez and Pepper Parks) defeated Team Tremendous (Dan Barry and Sozio) (c)	CZW Tag Team Championship	
7	Joe Gacy defeated Tim Donst	"I Quit" Match	13:56
8	Danny Havoc defeated Rickey Shane Page	Singles Match	11:02
9	Sami Callihan defeated David Starr	Singles Match	18:46
10	Matt Tremont (c) defeated A. R. Fox, Masada and Devon Moore	Four way Cage of Death match for the CZW World Heavyweight Championship	34:14

=== Cage of Death 18 ===
Cage of Death 18
- Promotion: Combat Zone Wrestling
- Date: December 10, 2016
- City: Voorhees Township, New Jersey
- Venue: The Flyers Skate Zone

Cage of Death 18 was the eighteenth annual Cage of Death event produced by the Combat Zone Wrestling professional wrestling promotion. It took place on December 10, 2016, at the Flyers Skate Zone in Voorhees Township, New Jersey. CZW founder, John Zandig, made an appearance at this event.

No.	Results	Stipulations	Time
1	Dave Crist defeated A. R. Fox, Tony Deppen, Zachary Wentz, Tim Donst, Alexander James and Jimmy Lloyd	6-man Scramble match	
2	Greg Excellent defeated Homicide	Singles match	
3	The Dub Boys (Dave McCall and Nate Carter) defeated Johnny Yuma and Kevin Martenson	Tag team match	
4	Shane Strickland defeated Dezmond Xavier	Singles Match	
5	EYFBO (Angel Ortiz and Mike Draztik) defeated Da Hit Squad (Dan Maff and Monsta Mack) (c)	Tag Team Match for the CZW Tag Team Championship	
6	Scarlet & Graves (Dezmond Xavier and Zachary Wentz) defeated EYFBO (Angel Ortiz and Mike Draztik) (c)	Tag Team Match for the CZW Tag Team Championship	
7	Lio Rush defeated Sami Callihan	Singles Match	
8	Joe Gacy defeated Jonathan Gresham (c)	Singles Match for the CZW World Heavyweight Championship	
9	Rickey Shane Page defeated Danny Havoc	Ultraviolent Death Match	
10	Devon Moore, Drew Blood, Dale Patricks and Josh Crane defeated Matt Tremont, Joey Janela, Jeff Cannonball and Conor Claxton	Cage of Death Match	

=== Cage of Death 19 ===
Cage of Death 19
- Promotion: Combat Zone Wrestling
- Date: December 9, 2017
- City: Sewell, New Jersey
- Venue: Rastelli Complex

Cage of Death 19 was the nineteenth annual Cage of Death event produced by the Combat Zone Wrestling professional wrestling promotion. It took place on December 9, 2017, at the Rastelli Complex in Sewell, New Jersey.

No.	Results	Stipulations	Time
1	Dan O'Hare and SHLAK defeated G-Raver and John Silver and Kody Rice and Shane Sabre	Ultimate Opportunity Six Way Match	10:00
2	Matt Tremont defeated Jimmy Lloyd	Thumbtack Massacre	14:04
3	Mr. Claxton defeated Alex Colon	Grudge Match	12:22
4	The REP (Dave McCall and Nate Carter) (with Maven Bentley) defeated Alex Reynolds and Dan Barry and oVe (Dave Crist and Jake Crist) (with JT Davidson) and Scarlet & Graves (Dezmond Xavier and Zachary Wentz) (c)	Four-Way Match for the CZW World Tag Team Championship	22:44
5	David Starr defeated Ethan Page	Singles Match	16:50
6	Nick Aldis defeated Tim Storm (c)	Singles Match for the NWA World Heavyweight Championship	3:47
7	Jimmy Jacobs defeated Jimmy Havoc	Singles Match	11:01
8	Chrissy Rivera and Greg Excellent defeated Ace Romero	2-on-1 Handicap Match	20:00
9	MJF (with Penelope Ford) defeated Joey Janela (c)	CZW Wired Championship	23:03
10	Rickey Shane Page (c) defeated Shane Strickland and Joe Gacy	Cage of Death Three Way Match for the CZW World Heavyweight Championship	28:20

=== Cage of Death XX ===
Cage of Death XX
- Promotion: Combat Zone Wrestling
- Date: December 9, 2018
- City: Philadelphia, Pennsylvania
- Venue: 2300 Arena
- Attendance: 1,000

Cage of Death XX was the twentieth annual Cage of Death event produced by the Combat Zone Wrestling professional wrestling promotion. It took place on December 9, 2018, at the 2300 Arena in Philadelphia.

No.	Results	Stipulations	Time
1	Jordan Oliver (c) defeated KC Navarro	CZW Wired Television Championship Title Match	
2	The REP (Nate Carter and Dave McCall) (with Maven Bentley and Kris Bishop) defeated BLKOUT (BLK Jeez and Ruckus) (c) (with Robbie Mireno)	CZW World Tag Team Championship Tables Match	
3	Anthony Greene (with the Platinum Hunnies (Ava Everett and Angel Sinclair)) defeated David Starr		
4	Leyla Hirsch defeated Mercedes Martinez		
5	Joe Gacy defeated Alex Reynolds		
6	John Silver defeated Shane Strickland and Rich Swann	3-Way Dance	
7	The Office (Kasey Catal, Conor Claxton, Brandon Kirk and Kit Osbourne) defeated Jimmy Lloyd, Maria Manic, Dan O'Hare and Mitch Vallen	Intergender Hardcore Match	
8	Atsushi Onita and Matt Tremont defeated D. J. Hyde and Masada	Tag Team Match	
9	Mance Warner defeated Rickey Shane Page	Cage Of Death Match for the vacant CZW World Heavyweight Championship	

=== Cage of Death XXI ===
Cage of Death XXI
- Promotion: Combat Zone Wrestling
- Date: December 14, 2019
- City: Voorhees Township, New Jersey
- Venue: The Coliseum

Cage of Death XXI was the twenty-first and last annual Cage of Death event produced by the Combat Zone Wrestling professional wrestling promotion. It took place on December 14, 2019, at the Coliseum in Voorhees Township, New Jersey.

No.	Results	Stipulations	Time
Dark	Brittany Blake defeated Kris Statlander (c)	WSU Championship Title Match	
1	John Silver defeated Conor Claxton	CZW Rules Match	
2	Young Dumb N Broke (Charlie Tiger, Cowboy Ellis Taylor and Griffin McCoy) (with Jordan Oliver) defeated Jimmy Rave, Steve Mack and Azrieal	Six Man Tag Team Match	
3	KC Navarro defeated Kris Bishop, Leon Ruff, Matt Macintosh and Gabriel Skye	Number One Contender Match for the CZW Wired Championship	
4	Anthony Greene and Ava Everett defeated Alex Reynolds and John Sterling	No Holds Barred Match	
5	A. R. Fox defeated Jordan Oliver (c)	CZW Wired Championship Title Match	
6	The Rep (Nate Carter and Dave McCall) (c) defeated Bear Country (Bear Bronson and Bear Boulder)	CZW World Tag Team Championship Title Match	
7	Joe Gacy (c) defeated Matt Tremont	CZW World Heavyweight Championship; If Tremont lost the match, D. J. Hyde had to leave CZW	
8	Jimmy Lloyd defeated Brandon Kirk (with Kasey Catal)	Cage Of Death Match	

== See also ==
- Combat Zone Wrestling
- CZW Best of the Best
- CZW Tournament of Death
