= Alexander James (wrestler) =

American professional wrestler

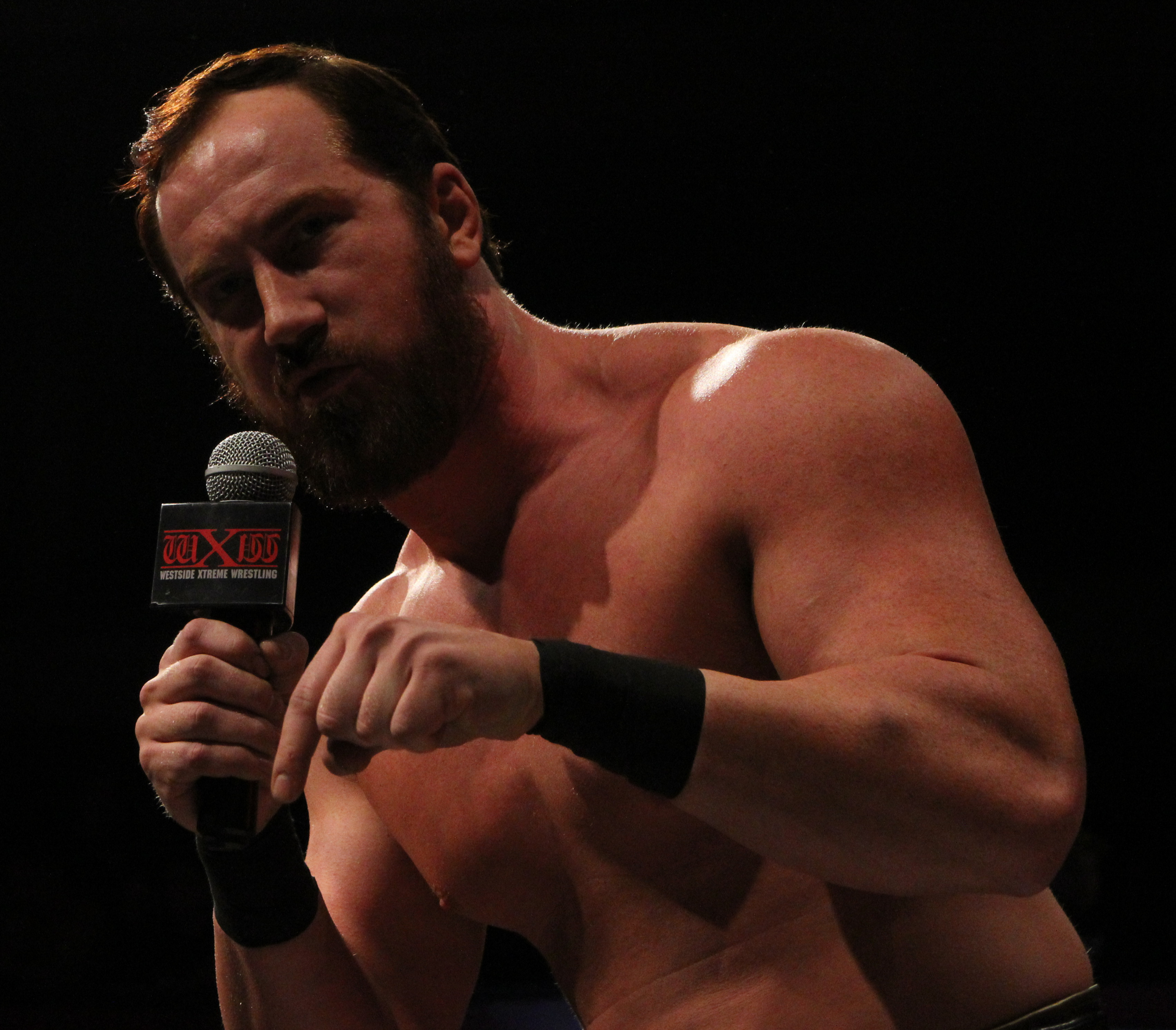
- James in 2020

Personal information
- Born: Alexander James Winkler Hereford, Maryland, U.S.

Professional wrestling career
- Ring name(s): Alexander James Winkler; Alexander James
- Billed height: 1.88 m (6 ft 2 in)
- Billed weight: 104 kg (229 lb)
- Trained by: CZW Dojo (Adam Cole, DJ Hyde, Rich Swann and Ryan McBride)
- Debut: 2009
- Retired: 2021

Alexander James Winkler is an American professional wrestler, better known by his ring name Alexander James. He is signed to WWE, where he works as a coach at the WWE Performance Center and also serves as a producer for their NXT brand. He is best known for his tenure in Combat Zone Wrestling (CZW), Westside Xtreme Wrestling (wXw) and most recently NJPW Strong.

== Professional wrestling career ==
=== Independent circuit (2009–2021) ===
James competed at the WWNLive SuperShow - Mercury Rising 2019, an event promoted by World Wrestling Network (WWN) on April 5, where he teamed up with Jurn Simmons and Marius Al-Ani as Team wXw in a losing effort to The Unwanted (Eddie Kingston, Joe Gacy and Shane Strickland) in a six-man tag team match. He worked for Oriental Wrestling Entertainment on the first night of OWE Toronto of August 7, 2019, where he fell short to Sammy Guevara. James competed at GCW Josh Barnett's Bloodsport 3 on October 11, 2020, an event produced by Game Changer Wrestling in partnership with Josh Barnett, where he lost to Calvin Tankman by way of knockout.

==== Combat Zone Wrestling (2010–2019) ====
James is known for his time in Combat Zone Wrestling, promotion for which he made his first appearance on November 13, 2010, at CZW Night Of Infamy 9: Betrayal, where he unsuccessfully challenged Drew Gulak for the CZW Wired Championship. At CZW Ascension on January 12, 2013, he teamed up with Drew Gulak as Campaign For A Better Combat Zone to unsuccessfully challenge The Nation Of Intoxication (Danny Havoc and Devon Moore) for the CZW World Tag Team Championship. James is a former CZW World Junior Heavyweight Champion, title which he held one time and defended it against superstars such as Rich Swann at CZW Cage of Death XVI on December 13, 2014. At CZW Cage of Death 18 from December 10, 2016, James participated in a 6-man scramble match also involving Dave Crist defeated A. R. Fox, Tony Deppen, Zachary Wentz, Tim Donst and Jimmy Lloyd. At CZW Best of the Best 16 from April 1, 2017, James participated in an eight-way match, competing against the winner Rickey Shane Page, Ace Austin, Caleb Konley, Flip Gordon, Mascarita Dorada, Ethan Case and Tony Deppen. At CZW Nineteenth Anniversary, James participated in a 30-man rumble match to determine the no.1 contender for the CZW World Heavyweight Championship, where he competed against other popular wrestlers such as the winner Maxwell Jacob Friedman, Ace Romero, Alex Reynolds, John Silver, Joe Gacy, Joey Janela and others.

=== Westside Xtreme Wrestling (2017–2020) ===
James made his first appearance for Westside Xtreme Wrestling at wXw We Love Wrestling Tour 2017: Gotha on February 3, where he defeated John Klinger by count-out. He competed for the wXw Shotgun Championship at wXw Road To 16 Carat Gold 2017 on February 18, where he unsuccessfully challenged David Starr for the title. At wXw Shortcut To The Top 2017, James participated in a 30-man shortcut to the top match where he competed against the winner John Klinger, Angélico, Jimmy Havoc, Matt Riddle and others. On the first night of wXw 16 Carat Gold 2018 from March 9, James fell short to Chris Brookes in a first-round match. At wXw Das 20. Mal Markthalle on May 18, 2018, he unsuccessfully challenged Ilja Dragunov for the wXw Unified World Wrestling Championship. At wXw 18th Anniversary on December 22, 2018, James teamed up with Jurn Simmons as The Crown and competed in a five-way gauntlet tag team match for the wXw World Tag Team Championship against the winners RISE (Da Mack and Tarkan Aslan), Avalanche and Emil Sitoci, Jay FK (Jay Skillet and Francis Kaspin) and RISE (Ivan Kiev and Pete Bouncer). At wXw 16 Carat Gold 2020, James lost in a first-round match of the tournament against Jeff Cobb on March 6, 2020.

== Personal life ==
James was previously married to fellow professional wrestler Killer Kelly.

== Championships and accomplishments ==
- Combat Zone Wrestling
  - CZW World Junior Heavyweight Championship (1 time)
- Ground Breaking Wrestling
  - GBW Breaker Championship (1 time)
- Maryland Championship Wrestling
  - MCW Rage Television Championship (1 time)
- Pro Wrestling Illustrated
  - Ranked No. 462 of the top 500 singles wrestlers in the PWI 500 in 2015
- WrestlingKULT
  - WrestlingKULT No Limits Championship (1 time)
- Xcite Wrestling
  - Xcite International Championship (1 time, inaugural)
