= Danny Havoc =

American professional wrestler (1986–2020)

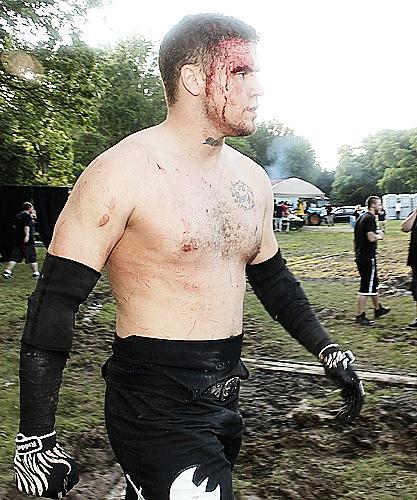
- Havoc in June 2013

Personal information
- Born: Grant Amos Berkland; May 19, 1986 Cylinder, Iowa, U.S.
- Died: May 31, 2020 (aged 34) Barrington, New Jersey, U.S.
- Spouse: Brianne Morrow (m. 2018; died 2020)

Professional wrestling career
- Ring name(s): Daniel T. Havoc; Daniel Tiberius Ulysses Horatio Hornblower Havoc; Danny Havoc
- Billed height: 6 ft 1 in (1.85 m)
- Billed weight: 190 lb (86 kg)
- Billed from: "The Unacknowledged Capital of Hardcore" Cylinder, Iowa
- Trained by: Mike Quackenbush; Chris Hero; D. J. Hyde
- Debut: July 30, 2005

Grant Amos Berkland (May 19, 1986 – May 31, 2020), better known by his ring name Danny Havoc, was an American professional wrestler. He was best known for his work in Combat Zone Wrestling (CZW), and was noted for mixing his technical style with hardcore wrestling.

In CZW, he was a two-time World Tag Team Champion (with Devon Moore and Lucky 13), two-time Ultraviolent Underground Champion, a one-time World Junior Heavyweight Champion and won Tournament of Death on two occasions. He announced his retirement at Tournament of Death 16, and wrestled his final match on September 9, 2017, which was covered on an episode of The Wrestlers. He also wrestled for Game Changer Wrestling (GCW), Westside Xtreme Wrestling (wXw), Big Japan Pro Wrestling (BJW), IWA Mid-South, IWA East Coast, and IWA Deep-South.

Two years after his final match, Havoc came out of retirement for a benefit show by Matt Tremont's H2O Wrestling and returned to Game Changer Wrestling for their Tokyo tour in February 2020.

== Professional wrestling career ==
=== Combat Zone Wrestling (2005–2017) ===
Havoc started wrestling in his family's barn with his friends after school. After watching many wrestling tapes and specifically after attending Combat Zone Wrestling's Cage of Death 6 event, Havoc traveled to Philadelphia to try out for CZW. After training for a few months, Havoc made his debut in the student battle royal at Tournament of Death 4 on July 30, 2005. At one point during the match, Havoc was set on fire by WHACKS.

He made his singles debut at the first annual Chri$ Ca$h memorial show on September 10, 2005. He defeated fellow CZW Academy graduate Andy Sumner with a Death Valley driver off the ring apron through a barbed-wire board propped up on two chairs outside the ring. He started a long feud with D. J. Hyde that included matches on CZW shows as well as STF (Stars of the Future) and NEXT shows. Havoc finally defeated Hyde at CZW's April 2006 show Any Questions? and, post-match, Hyde threw Havoc off of a balcony through a table.

Havoc won the World Junior Heavyweight Championship at the third annual Chri$ Ca$h memorial show on September 8 by defeating Joker, Scotty Vortekz, "Diehard" Dustin Lee, and Drake Younger in a five-way match. On December 1, Havoc made it to the finals of IWA Deep South's "Carnage Cup" tournament before falling to Freakshow. A week later, on December 8, at CZW's flagship show, Cage of Death, Havoc was the last member of Team CZW left standing on the top of the cage at the end of the big Cage of Death match.

Havoc won the seventh annual Tournament of Death on May 17, 2008. In the first round, Havoc advanced by beating the Ram in a light tube bundles match. In the semi-finals, Havoc and Nick Gage advanced by beating Pinkie Sanchez and Greg Excellent in a fans bring the weapons match. In the finals, Havoc was pitted against Younger, Vortekz and Gage in a no rope barbed wire 200 light tubes match to a single pinfall. During the match, Havoc was chokeslammed on two chairs by Necro Butcher and was dropped out of the ring by Gage, but his arm caught the barbed wire and was badly cut from his triceps to his armpit. The same year, he also won the IWA Deep South Carnage Cup, advancing over the Juggulator, WHACKS, and beating Gage, Freakshow, and Corey Shaddix in the finals. He was awarded the Ultraviolent Underground Championship at Decision '08, after then-Champion Younger, who also held the World Heavyweight Championship gave him the title, following a four-way match.

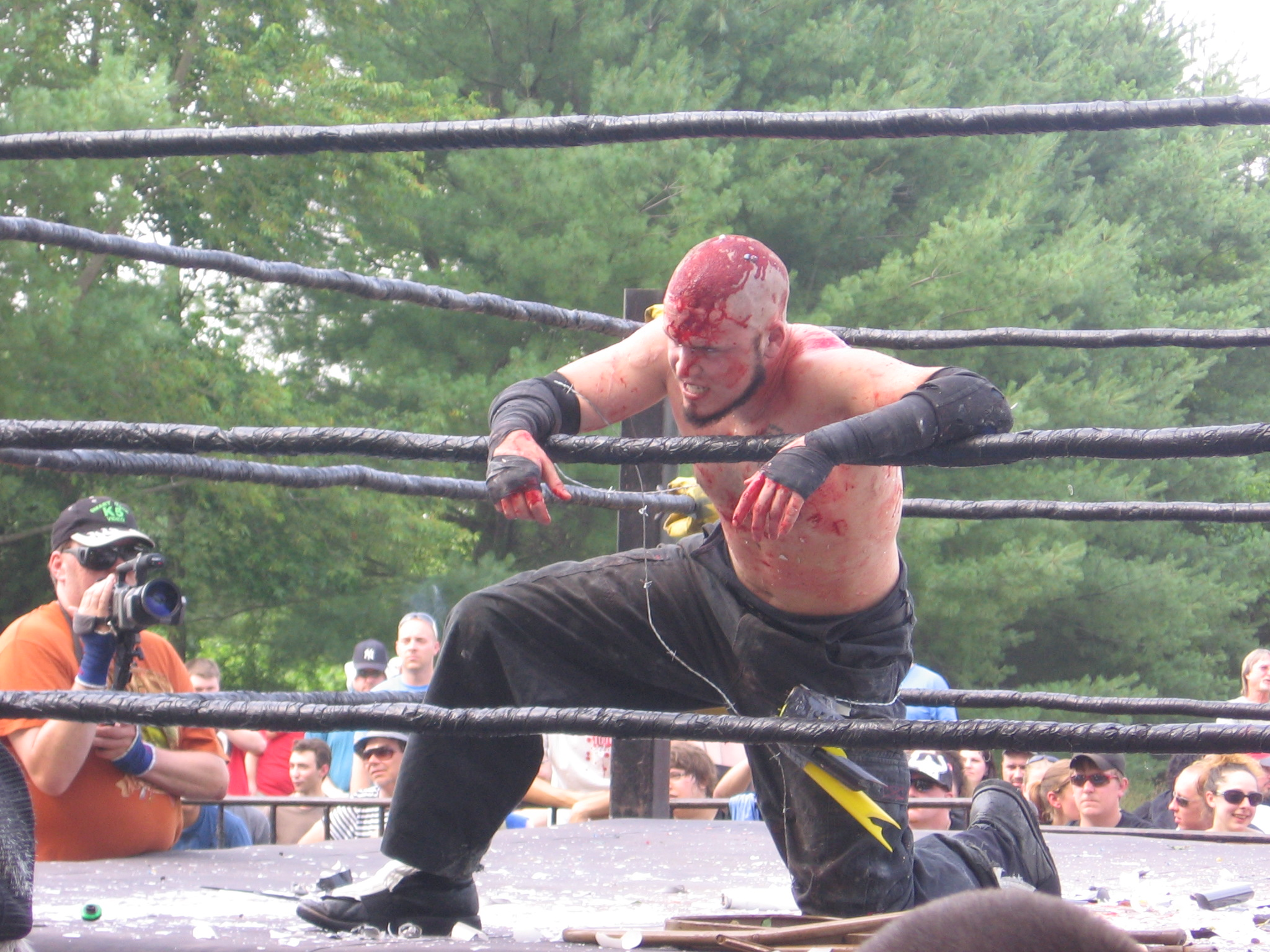
Havoc at CZW Tournament of Death 9 in 2010

Havoc made it to the finals of wXw's Gorefest II tournament in Germany, losing to Thumbtack Jack in a lighttubes and barbed-wire pits match. Havoc had defeated Thumbtack Jack the month before in the United States to retain his Ultraviolent Underground Title, which was covered on G4 Underground.

During 2009, Havoc was embroiled in a bitter feud with Switchblade Conspiracy founder Sami Callihan. This culminated in the 11th annual Cage of Death match, with Callihan winning and attempting to cut Havoc with a knife, only to be cut off by the returning Necro Butcher.

The following year, a feud erupted between Billy Gram's CULT FICTION faction (originally composed of Masada, tHURTeen, Brain Damage, and J. C. Bailey) and Havoc's babyface faction, which came to be known as The Suicide Kings (originally Havoc, Younger, Vortekz and Eddie Kingston). During this feud, Bailey died, Kingston defected from the company, and Younger turned on his friends, proclaiming himself "The Golden Boy" and aligning with CF. Devon Moore took the spot of Younger in the Suicide Kings, and toward the conclusion of the feud, occasional CZW participant and midwestern hardcore mainstay, Dysfunction, filled Kingston's spot, to bring the main event for Cage of Death 12 to an even four-on-four match. The Suicide Kings came out of the match victorious, and CF disbanded shortly thereafter. In the midst of that same year, at CZW Best of the Best X, Havoc defeated Jun Kasai to win the Ultraviolent Underground Championship for the second time. Havoc subsequently dropped the UVU belt to Masada four months later, and the title has since been retired.

From the remains of the Suicide Kings faction, Havoc declared that a new group was to be recognized, which he proclaimed to be "The Nation of Intoxication." This group initially consisted of Havoc, Moore, and Vortekz, who quickly invited Lucky 13 (formerly CULT FICTION's "tHURTeen") to join them. Vortekz departed the group and the company shortly thereafter, but the Nation continued to prosper, eventually winning the World Tag Team Championship on two occasions, trading them back and forth with heel group, 4LOKO. The Nation became known almost as much for their drunken shenanigans and comical antics as for their trademark daredevil style, punctuated by the core members' ability to combine exciting high-flying maneuvers with the hard-hitting, risk-taking ultraviolent style that CZW has made its name with.

Havoc subsequently became a semi-regular mainstay in Big Japan Pro Wrestling, as one of the most consistent representatives of CZW to compete in the legendary deathmatch promotion. On a 2012 tour, Havoc and Younger, his frequent travel partner, represented CZW as participants in BJW's Round Robin Deathmatch Survivor League, the winner of which was to earn a shot at the BJW Deathmatch title. Neither managed to advance far enough to be in title contention. Toward the end of the tour, Havoc and Younger — longtime friends — had a public falling out at the BJW Dojo, in which they came to blows and had to be pulled apart by BJW Dojo members. This sparked a feud between the two that saw the return of long-missing CZW favorite, Vortekz, who had at different times been tag partners with both men. Vortekz sided with Younger to defeat Havoc and fellow Nation of Intoxication member, Lucky 13.

In 2013, Havoc came out the victor in CZW's annual Tournament of Death, advancing over the likes of Rory Mondo and Big Japan Wrestling's young deathmatch prospect, Takumi Tsukamoto, then finally defeating his former friend and partner, Vortekz, in a 444 Lighttubes Death Match, in which eight-foot fluorescent bulbs were attached to the ropes on all four sides and scattered across the floor of the ring. Despite taking a great deal of punishment in the match, Havoc managed to reverse a top rope maneuver into his patented finisher, the General Order 24, onto a massive pile of bulbs for the pin. This makes Havoc one of only three two-time Tournament of Death champions in its fourteen-year history.

Havoc lost to Rickey Shane Page in an Ultraviolent Hardcore Match at Cage of Death 18. Page pinned Havoc after giving him a top rope powerbomb through a plate of glass. During that event, the Nation of Intoxication dissolved and Havoc went his own way, getting into a feud with Alex Colon. During Tournament of Death 16, Havoc announced his retirement and that he would face off against Colon at Down With The Sickness. At Once In A Lifetime, Havoc took part in a match against Atsushi Onita and his men from FMW.

Havoc lost his match against Colon to a standing ovation as D. J. Hyde and the locker room cheered for him. It was then confirmed by CZW officials that Havoc had officially retired from professional wrestling.

=== Return to wrestling (2019–2020) ===
Having come out of retirement at a benefit show for Matt Tremont's H2O Wrestling on October 6, 2019, Havoc was named as part of a Tokyo tour promoted by Game Changer Wrestling (GCW), where he was involved in tag team deathmatches. On February 3, at Live Fast Die Young, Havoc teamed with Tremont and Isami Kodaka against Drew Parker, Jimmy Lloyd and Toshiyuki Sakuda, where Parker missed a 450 splash but Havoc hit him with a death valley driver for the win. On February 4, at Ready to Die, Havoc teamed with Alex Colon against Kodaka and Sakuda, in which Havoc performed a around the world slam, followed by a death valley driver (called a General Order 24) on Kodaka for the win. On February 5, at Art of War, Havoc teamed with Colon and Tremont against Kodaka, Kenji Fukimoto and Takashi Sasaki. Havoc took the pin after Team Japan performed the super double knees off a ladder onto a bundle of light tubes with Havoc underneath. On February 15, at Run Rickey Run, Havoc faced SHLAK in a death match, replacing the injured Masashi Takeda. Towards the end, Havoc went for a death valley driver but missed the moonsault follow up, allowing SHLAK to hit him with two piledrivers on lighttubes and gusset boards for the win.

== Personal life and death ==
Grant Amos Berkland was born in Cylinder, Iowa, on May 19, 1986. He was married to Brianne Morrow from 2018 until April 4, 2020, when she died from heart failure at the age of 27 in Atco, New Jersey. Just under two months later on May 31, Berkland died at the age of 34 in Barrington, New Jersey. Tributes were paid by fellow wrestlers such as Mustafa Ali, Tim Donst, Jon Moxley, Tegan Nox, Kevin Owens, and Mia Yim.

== Championships and accomplishments ==
- Combat Zone Wrestling
  - CZW Ultraviolent Underground Championship (2 times)
  - CZW World Junior Heavyweight Championship (1 time)
  - CZW World Tag Team Championship (2 times) – with Devon Moore and Lucky 13
  - CZW Tournament of Death VII (2008)
  - CZW Tournament of Death XII (2013)
- Game Changer Wrestling
  - Tournament of Survival (2016)
- H2O Wrestling
  - H2O Tag Team Championship (1 time, inaugural) – with Connor Claxton
- Independent Wrestling Association Deep-South
  - IWA Deep South Carnage Cup Winner 2008
- Independent Wrestling Association Mid-South
  - IWA Mid-South Deathmatch Championship (1 time)
- Insane Championship Wrestling
  - ICW Insane 8 (2009)
