= Chri$ Ca$h =

American professional wrestler

Personal information
- Born: Christopher Jonathan Bauman Jr. July 13, 1982 Orlando, Florida, United States
- Died: August 18, 2005 (aged 23) Glassboro, New Jersey, United States

Professional wrestling career
- Ring name: Chri$ Ca$h
- Billed height: 6 ft 3 in (1.91 m)
- Billed weight: 195 lb (88 kg)
- Trained by: Jon Dahmer; Combat Zone Wrestling
- Debut: September 8, 2001

Christopher Jonathan Bauman Jr. (July 13, 1982 – August 18, 2005) was an American professional wrestler, better known by his ring name Chri$ Ca$h. Bauman wrestled in many independent promotions, but is known for his time in Combat Zone Wrestling, where he was a CZW World Tag Team Champion. On August 18, 2005, Bauman was killed in a motorcycle accident.

== Professional wrestling career ==
=== 2001 ===
Bauman began working for Combat Zone Wrestling (CZW) in 2001, after being trained at their training academy by Jon Dahmer. He made his debut, as "Chri$ Ca$h", at September Slam on September 8, 2001, in a three-way dance with GQ and Ian Knoxx, which Knoxx won. At They Said It Couldn't Be Done... Again on September 22, the three wrestlers were involved in a rematch, which Ca$h won. In another rematch a week later at Enough is Enough, GQ won. At And Justice For All in October, Ca$h teamed with GQ to defeat Knoxx and Chris Stylez in a tag team match. He began regularly teaming with GQ as "The New School", including an appearance at Cage of Death III when they competed in a three-way tag team match, which also included Knoxx and Stylez, and was won by VD (Jon Dahmer and Eddie Valentine).

=== 2002 ===
The start of 2002, however, saw Ca$h and GQ engage in a scripted rivalry, trading victories. Their third match at Out With Old In With The New in March went to a no contest, and afterwards, neither Ca$h nor GQ appeared for CZW for over four months. When they returned on July 13 at Deja Vu, it was as a team, defeating the teams of VD, Ian Knoxx and A.J. Styles, and Hurricane Kid and Towel Boy to earn a match for the CZW World Tag Team Championship later that night, which they lost to the defending champions, H8 Club. They continued teaming over the next few months, facing teams including Sonjay Dutt and Derek Frazier, The Backseat Boyz, and the Softcore Connection. On September 28 at Sanctioned in Blood, Ca$h defeated Ruckus and Sonjay Dutt in a ladder match. This signalled Ca$h's first major foray into singles competition, taking on Ruckus, Dutt and Jody Fleisch in both singles and three-way matches. At the end of 2002, Ca$h won the CZW award for finishing move of the year.

=== 2003 ===
In 2003, Ca$h began challenging for the CZW World Junior Heavyweight Championship, losing to Dutt in a number one contenders match in January. In Dutt's match for the championship against Ruckus, however, Ca$h was the special referee, and he attacked both wrestlers, before declaring the match a no contest. A match Ca$h then had with Ruckus then ended in a double disqualification, before he competed in the Best of the Best 3 tournament, where he was eliminated in the first round. On May 10, Ca$h unsuccessfully challenged Ruckus for the Junior Heavyweight Championship, before returning to his feud with GQ, that saw Ca$h lose a singles match to GQ, before eliminating him from a gauntlet match. On October 4 at Pain in the Rain 2, Ca$h attempted to help Nick Gage, who was being attacked by Nate Hatred and Trent Acid, but ended up being powerbombed over the ring ropes through a table to the floor. Ca$h then took a hiatus from CZW, returning at Cage of Death V in December, to face Joker in a ladder match, which he lost. The match, which was originally supposed to be a tag team match also involving Deranged and Azriael but was changed as Deranged and Azireal were not at the arena in time, was later described as "absolutely psychotic", and it was the match that began to get Ca$h mainstream attention.

=== 2004–2005 ===
In 2004 began with a loss for Ca$h in a four-way tables and ladders match at the Street Fight 2K4 show, which was won by Sabian, and in which Joker and Ruckus also participated. After the match, Sabian and Ruckus attacked Ca$h and Joker, setting up a tag team match for the next show. Ca$h and Joker lost the match after Joker turned on Ca$h and attacked him until Jimmy Jacobs and Dutt saved him. This resulted in a six-man tag team elimination tables match at Overdrive in March, which Ruckus, Joker and Sabian won after eliminating all the members of the other team, Ca$h, Jacobs and Dutt. Ca$h continued competing for CZW during the summer, alternately teaming with or facing GQ. He also competed in the Best of the Best IV tournament, but was eliminated in the first round. At Tournament of Death Ca$h competed in his first deathmatch, losing to JC Bailey. In September, Ca$h won a match allowing him to pick the members of a team for Cage of Death VI. This was followed by CZW owner John Zandig that Ca$h would be the captain of one of the team in the Cage of Death match, and Ca$h chose Bailey as his first team member. At the following show, Breaking Point: Let the Kaos Begin, Ca$h and Bailey won a CZW World Tag Team Championship match against The Blackout after winning a tag team gauntlet match. They originally won the match, but the decision was reversed once it was determined that Ca$h, who had made the pin, was not the legal man. At Cage of Death VI, Team Ca$h, consisting of Ca$h, Bailey, Nate Webb, and SeXXXy Eddy, defeated Team Blackout, which consisted of Ruckus, Sabian, Eddie Kingston, and Jack Evans, to win CZW World Tag Team Championship. The match contained a number of spots which were later described as "the psychotic daredevil spots for which Cash was known throughout his all-too-short career", including a spot where Ca$h performed his finishing move on Sabian off of the scaffolding surrounding the cage through four tables to land in the second row of the audience.

After a successful title defense against Excalibur and Super Dragon, Team Ca$h, consisting of Ca$h and Nate Webb, lost the championship to the H8 Club (Nick Gage and Justice Pain) at Only the Strong: Scarred for Life in February. This championship loss was his last match in CZW, as he had been scheduled to wrestle JC Bailey for the CZW Ultraviolent Underground Championship in March, but was forced to pull out of the match after an automobile accident. He did not make his return to CZW before his death in August.

== Death ==
On August 18, 2005, Bauman was killed as the result of a motorcycle accident near his home. He had been the passenger on a motorcycle driven by his cousin. A Ford Taurus turned in front of the motorcycle, causing it to strike the car on the driver's side of the vehicle. Bauman, who was only 23 years old, and his cousin both died at the scene; the driver of the car died en route to a nearby hospital.

== Championships and accomplishments ==
- Combat Zone Wrestling
  - CZW World Tag Team Championship (1 time)^{1} – with SeXXXy Eddy, Nate Webb and J. C. Bailey

^{1}Team Ca$h defended the championship under the Freebird Rule.
