= The Backseat Boyz =

Professional wrestling tag team

Tag team
- Members: Trent Acid; Johnny Kashmere
- Name: The Backseat Boyz
- Billed heights: 5 ft 11 in (1.80 m) – Acid; 6 ft 0 in (1.83 m) – Kashmere
- Combined billed weight: 372 lb (169 kg)
- Hometown: Philadelphia, Pennsylvania
- Debut: 2000
- Disbanded: June 18, 2010 (Acid's Death)

The Backseat Boyz were a professional wrestling tag team that consisted of Trent Acid and Johnny Kashmere who competed in Ring of Honor (ROH), Juggalo Championship Wrestling (JCW), Pro Wrestling Unplugged (PWU), Combat Zone Wrestling (CZW), Assault Championship Wrestling (ACW), the Premier Wrestling Federation (PWF), Jersey All Pro Wrestling (JAPW), and Japan together. They were the first team in history to hold both the ROH Tag Team Championship and the CZW Tag Team Championship.

The team disbanded following Acid's death in 2010. Kashmere has managed the new BackSeat Boyz tag-team of JP Grayson and Tommy Grayson since 2023.

== History ==
The Backseat Boyz were well known for their work in Combat Zone Wrestling. They began wrestling together in the early years of the company with Dewey Donovan as their manager. The Backseat Boyz became CZW Tag Team Champions by defeating the Haas Brothers in June 2000. They began a feud with Nick Mondo and Ric Blade, who eventually beat them for the tag team title. After losing the title, Acid and Kashmere continued teaming together and competed against teams such as The Briscoes, the H8 Club, and VD. They also competed in singles action, and Trent Acid even won some singles titles.

In 2003, The Backseat Boyz joined Messiah in his attempt to take over CZW and eliminate Zandig as part of the Hi-V stable. At Cage of Death V, The Backseat Boyz teamed with the rest of the Hi-V members in the Cage of Death match against Zandig's ultraviolent team. The Backseat Boyz had some setbacks that night as Acid had to wrestle twice and Kashmere had to be the first man in the Cage of Death with Zandig. Both Kashmere and Acid were eliminated from the Cage of Death match, and Hi-V broke up after that night. They only wrestled a few more matches in CZW after Cage of Death, and in February 2004, they officially parted ways with the company.

The Backseat Boyz also wrestled in Ring of Honor. They made their ROH debut in 2002 as CZW invaders at Glory By Honor when they jumped in the ring after coming through the crowd and made a challenge to any team. The challenge was accepted by Homicide and Steve Corino. The Backseats won after Corino turned on Homicide. One year later at Glory By Honor II, they competed in a tag team gauntlet match for the vacant ROH Tag Team Championship and won by defeating Special K in the last match. This win made them the first team in history to win the tag team championship in both ROH and CZW. They only held the title for a few weeks as they lost it to Special K at the following show. They continued wrestling together in ROH until Johnny Kashmere left the company, leaving Trent Acid to wrestle in singles competition. The team also competed in their own promotion, Pro Wrestling Unplugged.

On June 18, 2010, it was announced by Kashmere on his Facebook that Trent Acid died. He was found dead at his home by his mother. He was 29.

== Championships and accomplishments ==
- Assault Championship Wrestling
  - ACW Tag Team Championship (1 time)
- Combat Zone Wrestling
  - CZW World Tag Team Championship (3 times)
- East Coast Wrestling Association
  - ECWA Tag Team Championship (1 time)
- Hardway Wrestling
  - HW Tag Team Championship (3 times)
- Jersey All Pro Wrestling
  - JAPW Tag Team Championship (2 times)
- Phoenix Championship Wrestling
  - PCW Tag Team Championship (1 time)
- National Championship Wrestling
  - NCW Tag Team Championship (1 time)
- USA Xtreme Wrestling
  - UXW Tag Team Championship (1 time)
- Ring of Honor
  - ROH Tag Team Championship (1 time)
