= The Blackout (professional wrestling) =

Professional wrestling stable

Stable
- Name(s): BLKOUT; The BLKOUT; BLK-OUT; Blackout
- Members: Ruckus; James Ellsworth; Robby Mireno; BLK Jeez
- Former members: Human Tornado; Maven Bentley; Ricky Reyes; Jack Evans; 2 Cold Scorpio "Slyck" Wagner Brown; Eddie Kingston; Joker; Rich Swann; Alex Colon; Chrissy Rivera; Larry Legend
- Debut: 2004
- Years active: 2004-present

Blackout (often stylized as BLKOUT, The BLKOUT or BLK-OUT) is a professional wrestling stable appearing in Combat Zone Wrestling, Adrenaline Championship Wrestling, and other independent companies. Though the current members are Ruckus, James Ellsworth, BLK Jeez, Robby Mireno (aka Robby Illuminati), the team also competes in companies with other members, such as Joker and Eddie Kingston.

== History ==
=== CZW ===
The Blackout started as a stable in CZW with Ruckus, Sabian, Joker, and Robby Mireno. In 2004, they began a feud with Chri$ Ca$h, which saw a number of tag team matches. During this feud, Ruckus and Sabian won the CZW World Tag Team Championship from the H8 Club. In June 2004, Joker left CZW and wrestling entirely to fight in the war in Iraq. Eddie Kingston joined Blackout and continued the feud with Cash. The feud ended in a Cage of Death match at Cage of Death VI on December 11, 2004 when Blackout lost the tag titles to Team Ca$h of Chri$ Ca$h, J.C. Bailey, Nate Webb, and Sexxxy Eddie. In February 2005, Ruckus defeated Messiah for the CZW World Heavyweight Championship.

Later in 2005, Blackout started feuding with The Kings of Wrestling and Super Dragon. One main feud was between Eddie Kingston and Chris Hero, during which Kingston went as far as saying he would attack Hero's girlfriend. Kingston and Hero met in a Last Man Standing match at Night of Infamy 4. Hero won the match with three consecutive low blows. Also that night, Ruckus defended his title against Claudio Castagnoli. This same night, Joker returned and attacked Zandig and the H8 Club. He had a short feud with them, and then rejoined Blackout. At Cage of Death 7, Kingston and Sabian challenged the Kings of Wrestling for the tag titles, but did not win. Later that night, Super Dragon defeated Ruckus for the World title. During the match, Dragon reinjured Robbie Mireno (who was previously injured by Dragon) with a curb stomp on the ramp. Blackout would get some revenge on the next show by defeating the Kings of Wrestling and Super Dragon in a six-man tag team match. They would get further revenge on February 11, 2006 at CZW's 7th anniversary show when Eddie Kingston and Joker won the tag titles and Ruckus regained the World title.

On August 12, 2006, at Trapped, Eddie Kingston was kicked out of Blackout and his tag team title was given to Ruckus. Around this time, Sabian and Joker left Blackout and CZW. On September 9, 2006, Ricky Reyes joined Blackout and helped Eddie Kingston win the World Championship. Kingston then rejoined Blackout. Also on this day, Blackout was stripped of the tag team titles due to Joker's departure from CZW when he and Sabian joined Pro Wrestling Unplugged (PWU). On October 14 at Last Team Standing, two teams representing Blackout were entered in an 8-man tournament to crown new champions. However, Ricky Reyes couldn't be at the show, and Kingston refused to be in the tournament. Instead, Ruckus teamed with the debuting Human Tornado and Kingston brought in the Dead Presidents. The Dead Presidents lost in the first round, and Ruckus and Tornado lost in the second round to the Kings of Wrestling. After the match, Ruckus and Robbie Mireno attacked Human Tornado. Then, Sabian returned and helped with the attack. Also on this show, the original Blackout of Onyx and Rainman made their CZW debuts and started a feud with The Blackout, claiming that The Blackout has been ruining their name. On November 11, 2006, Robbie Mireno and Sabian teamed to defeat Chris Hero and Claudio Castagnoli, bringing the Tag Team Championships back to the Blackout a fourth time. They held the titles for one month and lost them to Onyx and Rainman at Cage of Death 8. Eddie Kingston lost the world title on the same show to Justice Pain. Sabian and Ruckus would regain the Tag Titles from Onyx and Rainman at New Year, New Opportunities on January 13.

On April 21, 2007, Ruckus and Sabian captured the Maryland Championship Wrestling Tag Team Championship, defeating champions Phat Blues Inc. (Kelly Bell and Buzz Stryker) and The Best of Both Worlds (Doyle Day and Buck Chyld).

On July 14, 2007, at CZW Best of the Best 7, Ruckus won the CZW World Heavyweight Championship for a third time defeating Justice Pain with help from Robby Mireno, Chrissy Rivera and Sabian. This also marked the BLKOUT's reunion with Joker who returned to CZW to take part in the Best of the Best Tournament, which he won. They congratulated him for his hard work and winning the tournament. At the October 11 CZW event entitled Decision 08, Ruckus and Sabian won the CZW World Tag Team Championship for a third time, before losing it back to 2 Girls, 1 Cup (the team of Beef Wellington and Greg Excellent). On the 11th Anniversary show, the Blackout lost a ladder match to Bruce Maxwell and TJ Cannon. When this happened, all the rights to the Blackout name (kayfabe) went to former manager Robby Mireno.

On May 14, 2011, at CZW Proving Grounds, Robby Mireno, Ruckus and Chrissy Rivera came out to the ring after a match between Rich Swann and Alex Colon and offered both of them a spot in BLK OUT. Which they both accepted.

=== Chikara ===
Eddie Kingston and Sabian competed in Chikara's Tag World Grand Prix 2006, but were eliminated in the quarterfinals by Team F.I.S.T.

Ruckus, Sabian, and Joker competed in King of Trios 2007, losing in the first round to Team TNA, the team of Alex Shelley, Chris Sabin, and Sonjay Dutt.

Ruckus, Eddie Kingston, and Joker then went on to compete in Chikara's 2008 King of Trios Tournament. They made it all the way to the Finals before they were defeated by Los Luchadores de Mexico (Lince Dorado, El Pantera, and Incognito).

=== Other ===
Although they lost rights to represent BLKOUT in CZW Sabian, Ruckus and Joker continued to perform together. Sabian and Joker under the name "Philly's Most Wanted" won CZW World tag team championship in 2011. Sabian and Ruckus had a few tag team matches in RCW, JAPW and ICW even challenging JAPW tag team championship.

In Spring of 2012 Sabian and Ruckus took part in Extreme Reunion/Rising shows, losing to Los Dramaticos (better known as the S.A.T.) and to The Gangstas. They won their match on November 17 in Monaca, PA against the FBI.

On July 21, 2012 it was announced that Ruckus and Sabian (as "Jeez") under the name BLKOUT would take part in an 8-team tournament to determine Ring Of Honor World tag team champions. This would be Sabian's debut in ROH and Ruckus's return to ROH after 4 years of absence.

== Championships and accomplishments ==
- Adrenaline Championship Wrestling
  - ACW Heavyweight Championship – Ruckus (1 time)
  - ACW Tag Team Championship – Ruckus and James Ellsworth (1 time)
  - ACW King of Maryland – Ruckus (1 time)
  - ACW King of Maryland – Robbie Illuminati (1 time)
- Atomic Championship Wrestling
  - ACW World Championship – Ruckus (1 time)
- Big Japan Pro Wrestling
  - BJW World Junior Heavyweight Championship – Ruckus (1 time)
- Combat Zone Wrestling
  - CZW World Heavyweight Championship (5 times) – Ruckus (3), Eddie Kingston (1) and BLK Jeez (1)
  - CZW World Tag Team Championship (7 times) – Ruckus and Sabian/ BLK Jeez (5), Eddie Kingston and Joker (1), Sabian and Robby Mireno (1)
  - CZW World Junior Heavyweight Championship (4 times) – Ruckus (2) and Sabian (2)
  - Best of the Best 6 – Ruckus
  - Best of the Best 7 – Joker
  - Best of the Best 8 – Sabian
- Extreme Rising
  - Extreme Rising Match of the Year (2012) vs. The Briscoe Brothers vs. Dramáticos
  - Extreme Rising Tag Team of the Year (2012)
- Independent Wrestling Association Mid-South
  - IWA Mid-South Tag Team Championship – Joker and Ricky Reyes
  - Revolution Strong Style Tournament (2006) – Eddie Kingston
  - Simply the Best Tournament (2006) – Ruckus
- Jersey All-Pro Wrestling
  - JAPW Heavyweight Championship – BLK Jeez (1 time)
  - JAPW Cruiserweight Championship – BLK Jeez (1 time)
- Maryland Championship Wrestling
  - MCW Tag Team Championship – Ruckus and Sabian (2 times)
  - MCW Cruiserweight Champion – Ruckus (2 times)
  - Shane Shamrock Memorial Cup (2006) – Ruckus
- Maven Bentley Association
  - MBA Tag Team Championship – Eddie Kingston and Sabian (1 time)
- Power Pro Wrestling
  - PPW Tag Team Championship – Ruckus & Robby Illuminati (2 times)
- Pro Wrestling Unplugged
  - PWU Tag Team Championship – Joker and Ricky Reyes (1 time)
- Rage Pro Wrestling
  - RPW Heavyweight Championship – Robby Illuminati (1 time)
- UWA Hardcore Wrestling
  - UWA Light Heavyweight Championship – Sabian (1 time)
  - UWA Tag Team Championship – Sabian and Joker (1 time)
- World Xtreme Wrestling
  - WXW Television Championship – Joker (1 time)
- Other titles
  - German World Heavyweight Championship – Ruckus (2 times)
