= J. C. Bailey =

American professional wrestler

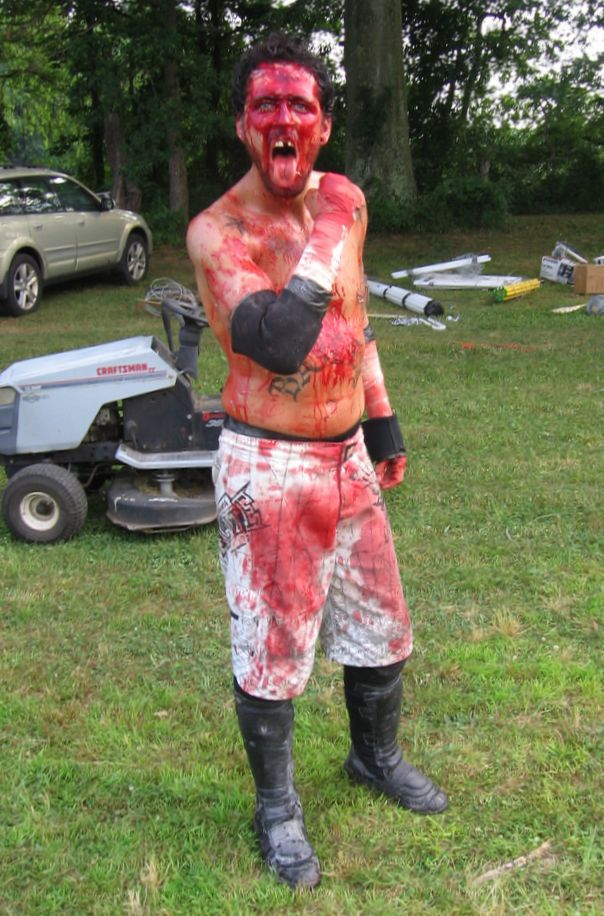
- Bailey at Tournament of Death 9 in June 2010

Personal information
- Born: Joseph Carl Bailey Jr. August 23, 1983 Louisville, Kentucky, United States
- Died: August 30, 2010 (aged 27) Bardstown, Kentucky, United States
- Cause of death: Intracranial aneurysm

Professional wrestling career
- Ring name: J. C. Bailey
- Billed height: 6 ft 0 in (1.83 m)
- Billed weight: 200 lb (91 kg)
- Billed from: Louisville, Kentucky
- Debut: 2001

Joseph Carl Bailey Jr. (August 23, 1983 – August 30, 2010), better known by his ring name J. C. Bailey, was an American professional wrestler. He wrestled for numerous American-based professional wrestling promotions including Combat Zone Wrestling, IWA Mid-South, and IWA East Coast.

== Professional wrestling career ==
Bailey made his professional wrestling debut in 2001.

On March 29, 2003, Bailey defeated Nate Webb to win the IWA Mid-South Light Heavyweight Championship. He lost the championship to Michael Todd Stratton on May 24, but regained it a week later on May 31. In June 2003, Bailey, Ian Rotten, and Corporal Robinson "invaded" Combat Zone Wrestling (CZW) on behalf of Independent Wrestling Association Mid-South (IWA Mid-South). The following month, he competed in the second annual CZW Tournament of Death where he lost to Nick Mondo in a deathmatch involving light tubes. On August 9, at Aftermath, Bailey lost the IWA Mid-South Light Heavyweight Championship to Sonjay Dutt. He also competed in the fifth annual IWA Mid-South King of the Deathmatch tournament in August, where he defeated 2 Tuff Tony, Necro Butcher, and Ian Rotten, before losing to Mad Man Pondo in the final. On November 21, Bailey won a three-way match against Dutt and Nate Webb to win the IWA Mid-South Light Heavyweight Championship for the third time. He held the championship for two months before losing it to Matt Sydal on January 17, 2004.

In June 2004, Bailey competed in the sixth King of the Deathmatch where he lost to Mad Man Pondo and Toby Klein, and the following month he participated in the third Tournament of Death where he lost to Wifebeater after defeating Chri$ Ca$h. On December 11, 2004, he teamed up with Chri$ Ca$h, Nate Webb and SeXXXy Eddy to win the CZW World Tag Team Championship. Team Ca$h held the championship until February 5, 2005, when Ca$h and Webb lost to H8 Club (Justice Pain and Nick Gage). The same night, Bailey became the first-ever CZW Ultraviolent Underground Champion. He lost the championship to Zandig in July 2005. The following month, on August 13, Bailey defeated Necro Butcher in a No Ropes Barbed Wire Death Match to win the Ultraviolent Underground Championship for the second time. He held the championship for over five months, before losing it to Nick Gage on January 14, 2006.

Between 2005 and 2007, Bailey competed in several more hardcore tournaments, including the fourth and fifth Tournaments of Death, seventh and eighth King of the Deathmatch tournaments, and Tournament of Death: Fast Forward.

On August 20, 2006, he went to Japan and competed in the professional wrestling tournament WRESTLE EXPO 2006 where he lost to 2 Tuff Tony after defeating Mad Man Pondo. On September 16, 2006, he competed in the first Masters of Pain tournament where he lost to the "Crazy Monkey" Jun Kasai after defeating 2 Tuff Tony and Corporal Robinson.

In December 2009, Bailey returned to CZW at Cage of Death 11, attacking Thumbtack Jack who had just won a no-ropes barbwire match against Nick Gage. Bailey was accompanied in this attack by 'Halfbreed' Billy Gram who in turn revealed that Bailey was the new member of The Cult Fiction stable led by Gram. Bailey and Gram were soon joined by tHURTeen, the returning Brain Damage and Masada in The Cult Fiction, and began a feud against fan favorites Danny Havoc, Drake Younger, Scotty Vortekz and Eddie Kingston who were dubbed The Suicide Kings. On May 15, 2010, Bailey competed in Ohio Hatchet Wrestling's "Death In The Valley" Deathmatch Tournament; where he defeated Drake Younger in the finals in a 40 Panes of Glass Scaffold Match to become the OHW Death In The Valley Champion. On June 5, Bailey won the 2010 IWA Mid-South King of the Deathmatch tournament. He defeated Ian Rotten, Nick Gage, and Balls Mahoney en route to the final, where he defeated Devon Moore. On June 26, Bailey competed in CZW's Tournament of Death 9, where he advanced through the first two rounds, before losing in the finals to Vortekz.

== Personal life ==
Bailey's father, Joseph Bailey, ran the Bad 2 the Bone Wrestling promotion in Kentucky, until his death from cancer on June 16, 2013.

In September 2006, Bailey was arrested and charged with possession of cocaine and drug paraphernalia in the first degree, attempted burglary in the second degree, and criminal mischief in the third degree. He was sentenced to one year in prison and was released on parole on August 31, 2007. Two months later, Bailey and another man were arrested while attempting to steal a 27-inch Samsung television from a Wal-Mart in Bardstown, Kentucky. Bailey was admitted to the hospital shortly afterward due to injuries suffered during the arrest. After pictures of Bailey's mugshot showing him covered in blood were released to the public, a local activist group held a vigil and filed a complaint to the town of Bardstown. While Bailey was only charged with a misdemeanor, his arrest resulted in his parole being revoked and he spent two years in prison. Bailey was released in December 2009.

== Death ==
Bailey was found dead on August 30, 2010, having died in his sleep. Prior to his death, he had complained of headaches and numbness in his hands. The cause of death was later determined to be due to a brain aneurysm, caused by complications due to multiple concussions and traumas to the brain. His brain was expected to be donated for research at Boston University.

== Championships and accomplishments ==
- Bad 2 the Bone Wrestling
  - BBW Hardcore Championship (2 times)
  - BBW Lightweight Championship (1 time)
  - BBW Tag Team Championship (2 times) – with Vic The Bruiser (1)
  - Rookie of the Year (2001)
- Coliseum Championship Wrestling
  - CCW Hardcore Championship (1 time)
  - CCW Lightweight Championship (1 time)
  - CCW Tag Team Championship (1 time)
  - CCW XXX Championship (1 time)
- Combat Zone Wrestling
  - CZW Ultraviolent Underground Championship (2 times)
  - CZW World Tag Team Championship (1 time) – with Team Ca$h (Chri$ Ca$h, Nate Webb, and SeXXXy Eddy)^{[a]}
- Independent Wrestling Association Mid-South
  - IWA Mid-South Light Heavyweight Championship (3 times)
  - IWA Mid-South King of the Deathmatch (2010)
- Insanity Pro Wrestling
  - IPW Junior Heavyweight Championship (1 time)
- Ohio Hatchet Wrestling
  - OHW Death In The Valley Deathmatch Champion (2010)

^{a} Team Ca$h defended the CZW World Tag Team Championship under the Freebird Rule.

== See also ==
- 27 Club
- List of premature professional wrestling deaths
