= CZW World Junior Heavyweight Championship =

Professional wrestling championship

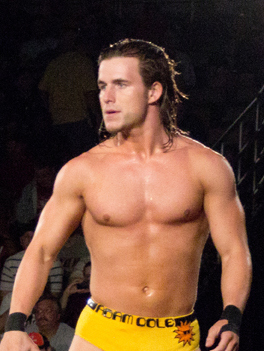
- Adam Cole holds the record for longest CZW World Junior Heavyweight Championship reign.

Details
- Promotion: Combat Zone Wrestling (CZW)
- Date established: February 19, 1999
- Date retired: October 10, 2015
Statistics
- First champion: The Sensational One
- Final champion: Greg Excellent
- Most reigns: Sabian (3 reigns); Trent Acid (3 reigns)
- Longest reign: Adam Cole (553 days)
- Shortest reign: Sami Callihan, The Sensational One and Sonjay Dutt (<1 day)

The CZW World Junior Heavyweight Championship was a professional wrestling junior heavyweight championship owned by the Combat Zone Wrestling (CZW) promotion. The championship was created and debuted on February 19, 1999, at CZW's Opening Night event. Only wrestlers under the junior heavyweight weight limit of 220 lb (100 kg) may hold the championship. Being a professional wrestling championship, the title is won via a scripted ending to a match or awarded to a wrestler because of a storyline.

Overall, there have been 37 reigns shared among 26 wrestlers, with two vacancies. The inaugural champion was The Sensational One, who was recognized as champion at CZW's Opening Night event. Sabian and Trent Acid are tied for the record of most reigns, with three each. At 553 days, Adam Cole's only reign is the longest in the title's history. Cole holds the record for most days as champion as well. The Sensational One's first reign, along with Sami Callihan and Sonjay Dutt's second reigns share the record for shortest reign at less than one day. The title was retired on September 8, 2012, when reigning champion A. R. Fox defeated CZW Wired TV Champion Dave Crist in a ladder match to unify the two titles, but the Junior Heavyweight Championship was revived on August 23, 2014.

== History ==
The first champion was crowned on February 19, 1999, at CZW's first show, Opening Night. The Sensational One was recognized as champion by CZW. He went on to defend the title that night against Quicksilver, who defeated him to become the new champion. As such, The Sensational One's first reign became the shortest reign in the title's history at less than one day, until September 9, 2006, when Sonjay Dutt defeated SeXXXy Eddy at CZW's Chri$ Ca$h Memorial Show – Down With The Sickness 2 event to become the new champion. Dutt then went on to lose the title to Jigsaw later that day at CZW's Expect the Unexpected show.

The title has changed hands four times outside of the United States. During Trent Acid's first reign, he was defeated by Winger in Tokyo, Japan on July 1, 2000, to mark the first instance. The second was also in Tokyo, with Men's Teioh becoming the new champion on September 15, 2000. The third was in Sapporo, Japan on May 4, 2001, while the fourth was in Yokohama, Japan on August 19, 2001. Jun Kasai won the title in Sapporo, while Acid reclaimed the title in Yokohama.

Following Acid's victory in Yokohama, the title was vacated for the first of two times. The vacancy was the result of a double pinfall in a match against Ruckus for the championship on September 29, 2001, at CZW's Enough is Enough event. Ruckus went on to win the vacant title in a Three Way match that also involved Acid and Winger on December 2, 2001. The second vacancy was the result of CZW stripping Chuck Taylor of the title on October 11, 2008. Ryan McBride became the new champion on December 13, 2008, at CZW's Cage Of Death 10: Ultraviolent Anniversary show by defeating Pinkie Sanchez, Carter Gray, Egotistico Fantastico, and Dan Paysan in a Ultraviolent Tables, Ladders, and Chairs match to win the vacant championship.

On May 8, 2010, at CZW's Fist Fight event, Adam Cole defeated then-CZW Junior Heavyweight Champion Sabian to become the new champion. Cole held the title for 553 days, the longest reign on record, before losing it to Sami Callihan on November 12, 2011, at CZW's Night Of Infamy 10: Ultimatum event. However, since August 23, 2014, Alexander James defended the title at CZW's events.

== Reigns ==
Key
No.	Overall reign number
Reign	Reign number for the specific champion
Days	Number of days held
N/A	Unknown information

No.	Champion	Championship change			Reign statistics		Notes	Ref.
No.	Champion	Date	Event	Location	Reign	Days	Notes	Ref.
1	The Sensational One	February 19, 1999	Opening Night	Mantua Township, New Jersey	1	<1	The Sensational One was recognized as the first CZW World Junior Heavyweight Champion by Combat Zone Wrestling.	
2	Quicksilver	February 19, 1999	Opening Night	Mantua Township, New Jersey	1	36		
3	The Sensational One	March 27, 1999	The Staple Gun	Mantua Township, New Jersey	2	7		
4	Justice Pain	April 3, 1999	House Show	Mantua Township, New Jersey	1	107		
5	Ric Blade	July 19, 1999	Street Fight	Mantua Township, New Jersey	1	264		
6	Justice Pain	April 8, 2000	Winner Takes All	Sewell, New Jersey	2	62		
7	Trent Acid	June 9, 2000	Live event	Paulsboro, New Jersey	1	22		
8	Winger	July 1, 2000	Live event	Tokyo, Japan	1	76		
9	Men's Teioh	September 15, 2000	Live event	Tokyo, Japan	1	231		
10	Jun Kasai	May 4, 2001	Live event	Sapporo, Japan	1	107		
11	Trent Acid	August 19, 2001	Ante Up	Yokohama, Japan	2	41		
—	Vacated	September 29, 2001	Enough is Enough	Sewell, New Jersey	—	—	The title was vacated due to a double pinfall in a match between Ruckus and Acid.	
12	Ruckus	December 2, 2001	Live event	Yokohama, Japan	1	13	This was a Three Way match for the vacant title involving Ruckus, Trent Acid, and Winger.	
13	Trent Acid	December 15, 2001	Cage of Death III	Philadelphia, Pennsylvania	3	399		
14	Ruckus	January 18, 2003	Live Again	Philadelphia, Pennsylvania	2	329		
15	Sonjay Dutt	December 13, 2003	Cage of Death V: Suspended	Philadelphia, Pennsylvania	1	392		
16	Alex Shelley	January 8, 2005	Gen Z	Philadelphia, Pennsylvania	1	28		
17	Mike Quackenbush	February 5, 2005	Only the Strong	Philadelphia, Pennsylvania	1	56		
18	Sabian	April 2, 2005	Trifecta Elimination III	Philadelphia, Pennsylvania	1	70		
19	Mike Quackenbush	June 11, 2005	Violent by Design	Philadelphia, Pennsylvania	2	91		
20	Derek Frazier	September 10, 2005	A' Big Mutha F'n Deal	Philadelphia, Pennsylvania	1	182		
21	Niles Young	March 11, 2006	When 2 Worlds Collide	Philadelphia, Pennsylvania	1	119	This was a Six Man Ladder match that involved Frazier, Young, Cheech, Cloudy, Sabian, and The Heretic.	
22	SeXXXy Eddy	July 8, 2006	A Prelude to Violence	Philadelphia, Pennsylvania	1	63		
23	Sonjay Dutt	September 9, 2006	Chri$ Ca$h Memorial Show – Down With The Sickness 2	Philadelphia, Pennsylvania	2	<1		
24	Jigsaw	September 9, 2006	Expect the Unexpected	Philadelphia, Pennsylvania	1	210		
25	Scotty Vortekz	April 7, 2007	Out with the Old, In with the New	Philadelphia, Pennsylvania	1	154		
26	Danny Havoc	September 8, 2007	Chri$ Ca$h Memorial Show	Philadelphia, Pennsylvania	1	35	This was a Six Man Ladder match that involved Vortekz, Havoc, DieHard, Joker, and Drake Younger.	
27	Sabian	October 13, 2007	Choosing Sides	Philadelphia, Pennsylvania	2	210		
28	Chuck Taylor	May 10, 2008	Best of the Best 8	Philadelphia, Pennsylvania	1	154		
—	Vacated	October 11, 2008	—	Philadelphia, Pennsylvania	—	—	Taylor was stripped of the championship due to an inability to compete after suffering a broken collarbone	
29	Ryan McBride	December 13, 2008	Cage of Death X	Philadelphia, Pennsylvania	1	147	McBride defeated Pinkie Sanchez, Carter Gray, Egotistico Fantastico, and Dan Paysan in a Ultraviolent Tables, Ladders, and Chairs match to win the vacant championship.	
30	Egotistico Fantastico	May 9, 2009	Blood Pressure: Rising	Philadelphia, Pennsylvania	1	126		
31	Drew Blood	September 12, 2009	Chri$ Ca$h Memorial Show/Down With The Sickness Forever	Philadelphia, Pennsylvania	1	91		
32	Greg Excellent	December 12, 2009	Cage of Death XI	Philadelphia, Pennsylvania	1	63		
33	Sabian	February 13, 2010	11th Anniversary: Deadly Doubleheader	Philadelphia, Pennsylvania	3	84		
34	Adam Cole	May 8, 2010	Fist Fight	Philadelphia, Pennsylvania	1	553		
35	Sami Callihan	November 12, 2011	Night of Infamy 10: Ultimatum	Philadelphia, Pennsylvania	1	175		
36	Drake Younger	May 5, 2012	Cinco de Mayo	Bloomington, Indiana	1	70		
37	Sami Callihan	July 14, 2012	New Heights	Voorhees Township, New Jersey	2	<1	This was a 60 minute Ultraviolent Rules Iron Man match.	
38	A. R. Fox	July 14, 2012	New Heights	Voorhees Township, New Jersey	1	56		
—	Unified	September 8, 2012	Down with the Sickness 2012	Voorhees Township, New Jersey	—	—	The title was unified with the CZW Wired TV Championship and subsequently retired, when A. R. Fox defeated Dave Crist in a title unification ladder match.	
39	Alexander James	August 23, 2014	N/A	Voorhees Township, New Jersey	1	203	Declared the Honorary CZW World Junior Heavyweight Champion.	
40	Greg Excellent	March 14, 2015	Deja Vu	Voorhees Township, New Jersey	2	210		
—	Deactivated	October 10, 2015	—	Voorhees Township, New Jersey	—	—	Inactive since October 10, 2015.	

== Combined reigns ==
Rank	Wrestler	No. of reigns	Combined days
1	Adam Cole	1	553
2	Trent Acid	3	462
3	Sonjay Dutt	2	392
4	Sabian	3	364
5	Ruckus	2	342
6	Greg Excellent	2	273
7	Ric Blade	1	264
8	Men's Teioh	1	231
9	Jigsaw	1	210
10	Alexander James	1	203
11	Derek Frazier	1	182
12	Sami Callihan	2	175
13	Justice Pain	2	169
14	Chuck Taylor	1	154
14	Scotty Vortekz	1	154
16	Mike Quackenbush	2	147
16	Ryan McBride	1	147
18	Egotistico Fantastico	1	126
19	Niles Young	1	119
20	Jun Kasai	1	107
21	Drew Blood	1	91
22	Drake Younger	1	70
23	SeXXXy Eddy	1	63
24	A. R. Fox	1	56
25	Quicksilver	1	36
26	Danny Havoc	1	35
27	Alex Shelley	1	28
28	The Sensational One	2	7
