= Joker (wrestler) =

American professional wrestler (born 1983)

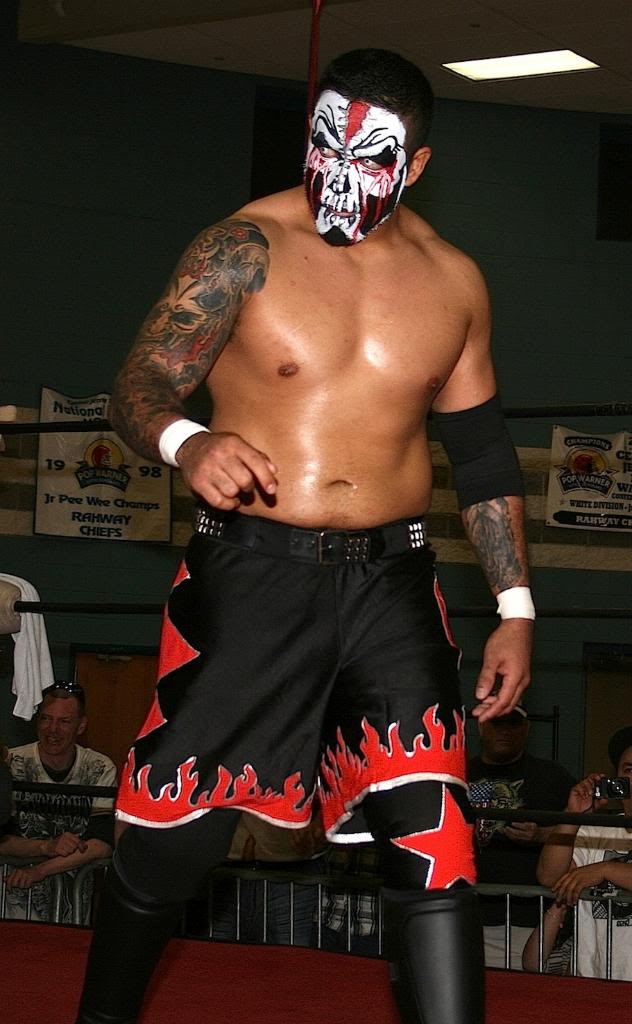
- Joker wearing his iconic facepaint before a 2012 match in JAPW

Personal information
- Born: William Posada; October 10, 1983 (age 42) Philadelphia, Pennsylvania, U.S.

Professional wrestling career
- Ring name(s): Colt Cabunny; Insayashi; Joker
- Billed height: 5 ft 11 in (1.80 m)
- Billed weight: 190 lb (86 kg)
- Billed from: Chicago, Illinois (as Colt Cabunny)
- Trained by: Jon Dahmer; Mike Quackenbush
- Debut: 2000

William Posada (born October 10, 1983) is an American independent professional wrestler best known under the ring name Joker. He worked for the Combat Zone Wrestling promotion, IWA Mid-South, Chikara and UWA Hardcore Wrestling.

== Career ==
=== Dangerously Intense Wrestling (2000–2002) ===
Joker started his wrestling career in Dangerously Intense Wrestling where he was formally trained by Jay Tee Wilcoxson who helped him develop his unique and intense wrestling style. Joker went on to team with Sabian and Karnage to form The Dark Karnavil. They held the DIW Tag Team Champions and were one of the most intense wrestling groups in the Philadelphia wrestling community.

=== Combat Zone Wrestling (2002–2012, 2014) ===
Joker began his CZW wrestling career in Combat Zone Wrestling in 2002. He is a member of "The Blackout" stable with Ruckus, Eddie Kingston, Sabian and Robby Mireno. In June 2004, Joker put his wrestling career on hold to fight in the Iraq War. His last match was a death match against John Zandig and they wrestled in a secluded garage whilst the other members of Blackout watched on. The match was ended early as Blackout, getting upset watching their friend and partner receive a bloody beating, interfered in the match.

Joker returned to Combat Zone Wrestling, on November 14, 2004. Joker won his first title in Combat Zone Wrestling on February 11, 2006, when he teamed with fellow Blackout member Eddie Kingston to win the CZW World Tag Team Championship from the then champions, Chris Hero and Claudio Castagnoli. On August 12, 2006, Eddie Kingston was kicked out of the Blackout stable during the title reign and, as a result of this, his half of the CZW World Tag Team Championship was given to Blackout member Ruckus. After August 12, 2006, however, Joker's profile was removed from the official Combat Zone Wrestling website, as he left the promotion to join Pro Wrestling Unplugged, which resulted in the CZW World Tag Team Championship being vacated. Despite leaving Combat Zone Wrestling, Joker still wrestled under the stable of The Blackout in other promotions. Joker won the UWA Tag Team Championship with Sabian on October 28, 2006.

Upon joining Pro Wrestling Unplugged, Joker formed a successful tag team with Ricky Reyes. Their union came about during The Pitbull/Public Enemy Tag Team Tournament which Ricky Reyes entered with partner Homicide, who form part of The Rottweilers stable in Ring of Honor. Homicide and Ricky Reyes faced Jay Briscoe and Joker (who was acting as replacement for Mark Briscoe who was injured in the first round) in the second round. Homicide and Ricky Reyes won the match when Joker turned on his partner. Joker and Ricky Reyes would later win the PWU Tag Team Championship at the PWU vs. JCW event, Cuffed & Caged on January 20, 2007. The team would lose the titles two months later.

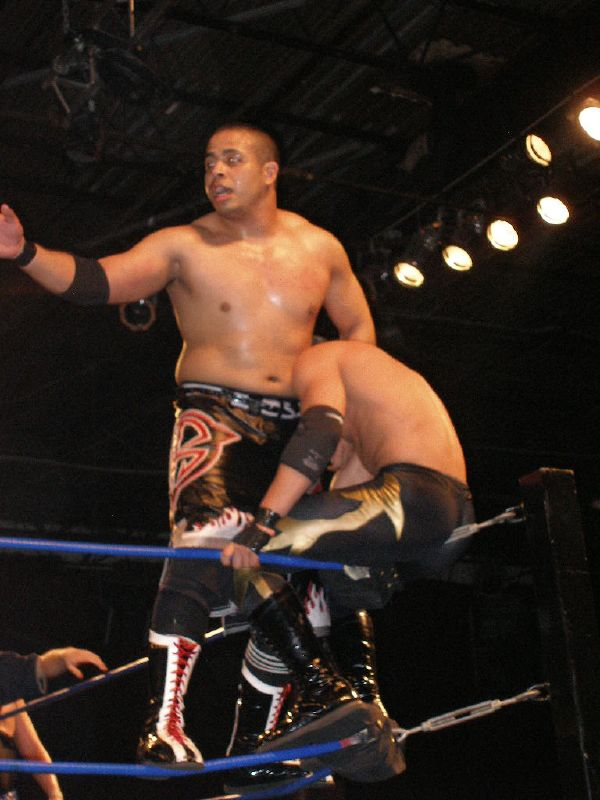
Joker during a Chikara event in 2008

On July 14, 2007, Joker returned to CZW and won the Best of the Best 2007 tournament. He was Maven Bentley's second pick and beat Drake Younger in round one, Ricky Reyes, Vortekz, and Human Tornado in the semi-finals, and B-Boy in the finals. Since this event, Joker has continued to wrestle in CZW and has been added to the roster page of the website. At the Combat Zone Wrestling event, Dishonorable Conduct, Joker rejoined with The Blackout teaming with Ruckus against Homicide and Ricky Reyes after a confrontation between The Blackout and The Rottweilers. Joker won the match for his team, pinning Ricky Reyes.

At CZW Night of Infamy on November 10, 2007, Joker defeated D. J. Hyde to win the CZW Iron Man Championship. Joker lost the title at CZW New Year's Resolution to Brain Damage in a 20-minute Iron Man Homerun Derby deathmatch for both Joker's CZW Iron Man Championship and Brain Damage's CZW Ultraviolent Underground Championship.

On September 13, 2008 he wrestled during a double show held by CZW to honor Chri$ Ca$h. On the first show he, alongside Team BLKOUT, lost to Team Ca$h (B-Boy, Nate Webb, Derek Frazier and Nick Gage). On the second show, Joker teamed with Sabian to defeat B-Boy and Derek Frazier. Shortly after Joker announced that it was his final wrestling match as he was being ordered to return to active duty in the Iraq war.

On July 10, 2010, Joker returned to Combat Zone Wrestling at their "Home Sweet Home" show, attacking Tyler Veritas and reuniting with former BLK OUT partner Sabian. Forming a new tag team named "Philly's Most Wanted," they entered a tournament to crown the new CZW World Tag Team Champions. After defeating the team of Adam Cole and Tyler Veritas in the first round, and Irish Driveby (Ryan McBride and Rich Swann) in the semi-finals, they went on to win the titles at CZW's Cage of Death XII, defeating the Osirian Portal. Philly's Most Wanted would hold the titles for two months, before losing the belts to The Briscoe Brothers. At CZW Proving Grounds, Philly's Most Wanted would regain the titles from the Briscoe Brothers defeating the Briscoes in their second match of the night.

It was shortly after CZW Redemption that Joker announced his retirement.

Joker returned on May 10 at CZW at Proving Ground 2014, and defeated Azrieal via the Shining Wizard.

== Championships and accomplishments ==
- Combat Zone Wrestling
  - CZW Iron Man Championship (1 time)
  - CZW World Tag Team Championship (3 times) – with Eddie Kingston (1) and Sabian (2)
  - Best of the Best 7
- Dangerously Intense Wrestling
  - DIW Tag Team Championship (1 time) – with Sabian and Karnage
- Independent Championship Wrestling
  - ICW Pure X Championship (1 time)
- Independent Wrestling Association Mid-South
  - IWA Mid-South Tag Team Championship (1 time) – with Ricky Reyes
- Pro Wrestling Unplugged
  - PWU Tag Team Championship (1 time) – with Ricky Reyes
- UWA Hardcore Wrestling
  - UWA Tag Team Championship (1 time) – with Sabian
- World Xtreme Wrestling
  - WXW Television Championship (1 time)
