= CZW World Tag Team Championship =

Professional wrestling tag team championship

Details
- Promotion: Combat Zone Wrestling
- Date established: February 13, 1999
- Current champions: Post Game (Mike Walker and Vinny Talotta)
- Date won: February 28, 2026
Statistics
- First champions: Jon Dahmer and Jose Rivera, Jr.
- Most reigns: (as a team); The BLK-OUT (Sabian and Rukus) (5) (as an individual); Sabian/BLK Jeez (9)
- Longest reign: The REP (Dave McCall and Nate Carter) (668 days)
- Shortest reign: Jon Dahmer and Jose Rivera, Jr. (<1 day); 2 Girls, 1 Cup (Beef Wellington and Greg Excellent) (<1 day)
- Oldest champion: Men's Teioh (34 years, 244 days)
- Youngest champion: Mark Briscoe (16 years old, 178 days)
- Heaviest champion: John Zandig (256 lb (116 kg)); Nate Hatred (256 lb (116 kg)); Onyx (256 lb (116 kg))
- Lightest champion: Sabian (165 lb (75 kg))

The CZW World Tag Team Championship is a professional wrestling world tag team championship owned and copyrighted by the Combat Zone Wrestling (CZW) promotion; it is contested for in their tag team division. It was created and debuted on February 13, 1999 at CZW's Opening Night event, where Jon Dahmer and Jose Rivera, Jr. were awarded the championship, becoming the inaugural champions in the process.

Overall, there have been 60 reigns, shared between 77 individual wrestlers and 44 teams, and four vacancies.

Post Game (Mike Walker & Vinny Talotta), are the current champions in their third reign.

== History ==
On February 13, 1999, CZW debuted their version of a tag team championship, which they named the CZW World Tag Team Championship at the company's Opening Night event. Jon Dahmer and Jose Rivera, Jr. were awarded the championship at the said event, becoming the inaugural champions in the process. Although the title is a world tag team championship, supposedly only intended for tag teams, a wrestler has held the championship by himself – Justice Pain. Pain held the championship during his entire reign alone, from November 20, 1999 to January 8, 2000, when he lost it to The Thrill Kill Kult (Diablos Macabre and Midknight); the same team he defeated to win the championship.

== Reigns ==
The inaugural champions were Jon Dahmer and Jose Rivera, Jr., who were awarded the championship on February 13, 1999 at CZW's Opening Night event. At 668 days, The REP (Dave McCall and Nate Carter)'s third reign is the longest in the title's history. Dahmer's and Rivera, Jr.'s only reign and 2 Girls, 1 Cup (Beef Wellington and Greg Excellent)'s first reign are tied for the record for the shortest in the title's history at less than one day. The BLK-OUT (Sabian and Rukus) hold the record for most reigns, with five. Milk Chocolate (Brandon Watts and Randy Summers) are the current champions, who are in their first reign. They defeated CMD (Desean Pratt and Boom Harden) on September 3, 2023, at CZW Limelight XX to win the titles. Overall, there have been 60 reigns, shared between 77 individual wrestlers and 44 teams, and four vacancies.
