= Heritage Glass Museum =

Coordinates: 39.702560°N 75.110703°W

- Established: September 23, 1979
- Location: Glassboro, New Jersey
- Type: Local history museum
- Key holdings: Blenko glass
- Website: www.heritageglassmuseum.com

== Museum ==
On September 23, 1979, the Heritage Glass Museum was founded as a 501c(3) non-profit organization. The current location is at 25 High Street in Glassboro, which is a former Glassboro Title & Trust Company bank building that failed in 1931 due to the Depression. In its last function before the museum was founded, it was the Glassboro Public Library from 1963 to 1979. The land was once part of the original Stanger Glass Works.

The Museum has exhibits of historic glass, bottles and animal glass art figurines. It has an extensive library on glass blowing and education. It also loans out items for display at other museums and institutions of learning.

The Heritage Glass Museum is a historical museum in Glassboro, New Jersey, United States. It records the glass making and glass art which started in Glassboro in 1779. The museum was founded in 1979 and its mission is to educate and preserve the heritage of glass manufacturing and glass blowing in South Jersey.

== Early history ==
In 1779, members of the Stanger family, all glass blowers, left Alloway Township, New Jersey and the Wistar glassworks. Soloman Stanger had found clay, quality sands and adequate Oak wood for the glass furnaces, along with a ready market across the river at Philadelphia, Pennsylvania. This was near Carpenter’s Landing close to the narrow Mantua Creek. He purchased 200 acres of land there. The Stangers were German immigrants who had worked in Salem County, New Jersey and Lancaster County, Pennsylvania glass works and were ready to start their own business.

Their timing due to the American Revolution was unfortunate because the Stanger Glass Works closed in late 1781 primarily due to inflation of the new American Revolutionary War money, high costs of transportation and being unable to pay off their debts.

== Post American Revolution ==
Colonels Thomas Heston and Thomas Carpenter purchased the glass blowing equipment in 1786. The Heston-Carpenter Glass Works became financially successful and upon the death of the partners was sold. Over time the once Stanger Glass works later became the Olive Works, the Temperanceville Glass Works, the Harmony Glass Works (by mid 1830), the Whitney Brothers Glass Works in 1838, the Owens Bottle Company by 1922, and finally the Owens Illinois Glass Company circa 1926.

The Whitney Brothers Glass work was bought in 1838 by Thomas Whitney the eldest son of Ebenezer Whitney who settled in Glassboro in 1805 due to an accident at sea. Over the next seventy five years, the company flourished and at one point had over a thousand workers and thousands of acres of land.

Glassboro was once the United States best equipped and extensive glass producing area of the country with the largest variety of colors and styles. By the 1930s, plastics had begun to replace glass in the domestic markets. The age of mass production of glass and glass blowing was ending.
