= Mantua Creek =

River in New Jersey, United States

Mantua Creek is a tributary of the Delaware River in Mantua Township, Gloucester County, New Jersey. Mantua Creek's headwaters are near Glassboro, flowing northwest for 18.6 miles (29.9 kilometers) to the Delaware River at the Port of Paulsboro in Paulsboro across from present-day Philadelphia International Airport.

The name Mantua Creek is derived from the name of the Manta, or Mantes, subtribe of the Lenape Native Americans. Colonial-era maps refer to the creek with names such as Manteskÿl, Great Mantoes Creek, and Manto Creek.

Mantua Creek and its two major tributaries, Edwards Run and Chestnut Branch, drain over 50 square miles (130 km^{2}) of Gloucester County.

== History ==
Early human settlement along Mantua Creek dates back to the Lenni-Lenape Native Americans who exploited its abundance of fish and game and utilized the creeks for transportation. Early European settlers also used the creek for transportation, and constructed saw mills and grist mills on the creek and its streams, encouraging flood plain development for agriculture.

Carpenter's Landing was a 17th-century mercantile settlement located at the head of sloop navigation on Mantua Creek.

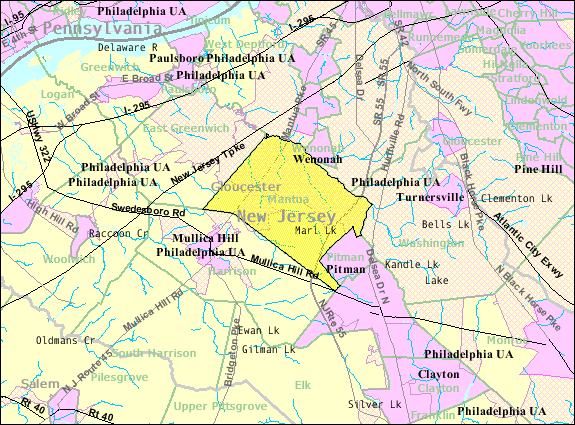
Mantua Township, New Jersey

American rebel forces erected a gun battery on the point above Manto Creek from which they raked Navy ships that were anchored to fire on the forts defending Philadelphia, preventing the British being able to supply its troops by the Delaware River during its campaign of 1777.

In the 1860s, it was described as "a place of considerable trade in lumber, cordwood, etc., and contains one tavern, two stores, 30 dwellings and a Methodist church". The landing is said to have been named either for a man named Carpenter who built boats at the site during its mercantile boom days, or Edward Carpenter (son of Thomas Carpenter and descendant of Samuel Carpenter of Philadelphia, Pennsylvania) who owned the Heston & Carpenter Glass Works at nearby Glassboro, New Jersey in 1786 in partnership with Col. Thomas Heston, his wife's nephew.

== Bridge problem ==
The bridge at 39.8346°N 75.23665°W has been cited for two freight train derailments, one in 2009 and one in 2012. On November 30, 2012 a serious accident released vinyl chloride from rail cars that plunged into the creek. Coast Guard officials reported that the tidal flows of the creek seriously delayed cleanup.

== See also ==
- List of rivers of New Jersey
