= Jesse Chew House =

Historic house in New Jersey, United States

- U.S. National Register of Historic Places
- New Jersey Register of Historic Places
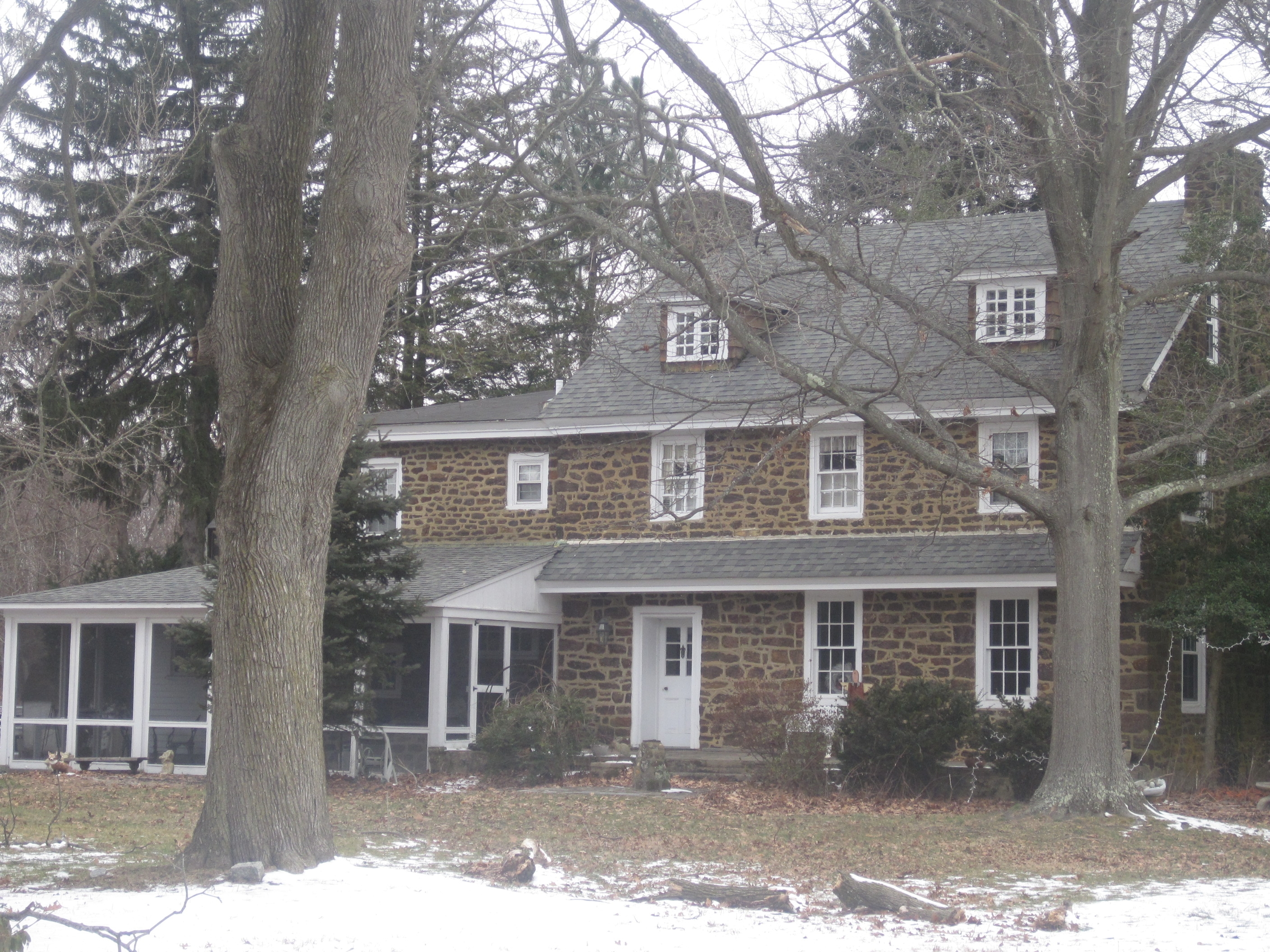

- Location within Gloucester County, New Jersey Location within New Jersey Location within the United States
- Location: 611 Mantua Boulevard, Mantua Township, New Jersey
- Coordinates: 39.77367°N 75.14985°W
- Area: 7.5 acres (3.0 ha)
- Built: 1772
- NRHP reference No.: 72000797
- NJRHP No.: 1400

Significant dates
- Added to NRHP: October 18, 1972
- Designated NJRHP: March 15, 1972

The Jesse Chew House is located at 611 Mantua Boulevard in the Sewell section of Mantua Township in Gloucester County, New Jersey, United States. The stone house was built in 1772 and was added to the National Register of Historic Places on October 18, 1972, for its significance in architecture. Jesse Chew was a Methodist minister.

== See also ==
- National Register of Historic Places listings in Gloucester County, New Jersey
- List of the oldest buildings in New Jersey
