= Tall Pines State Preserve =

Nature preserve in New Jersey, US

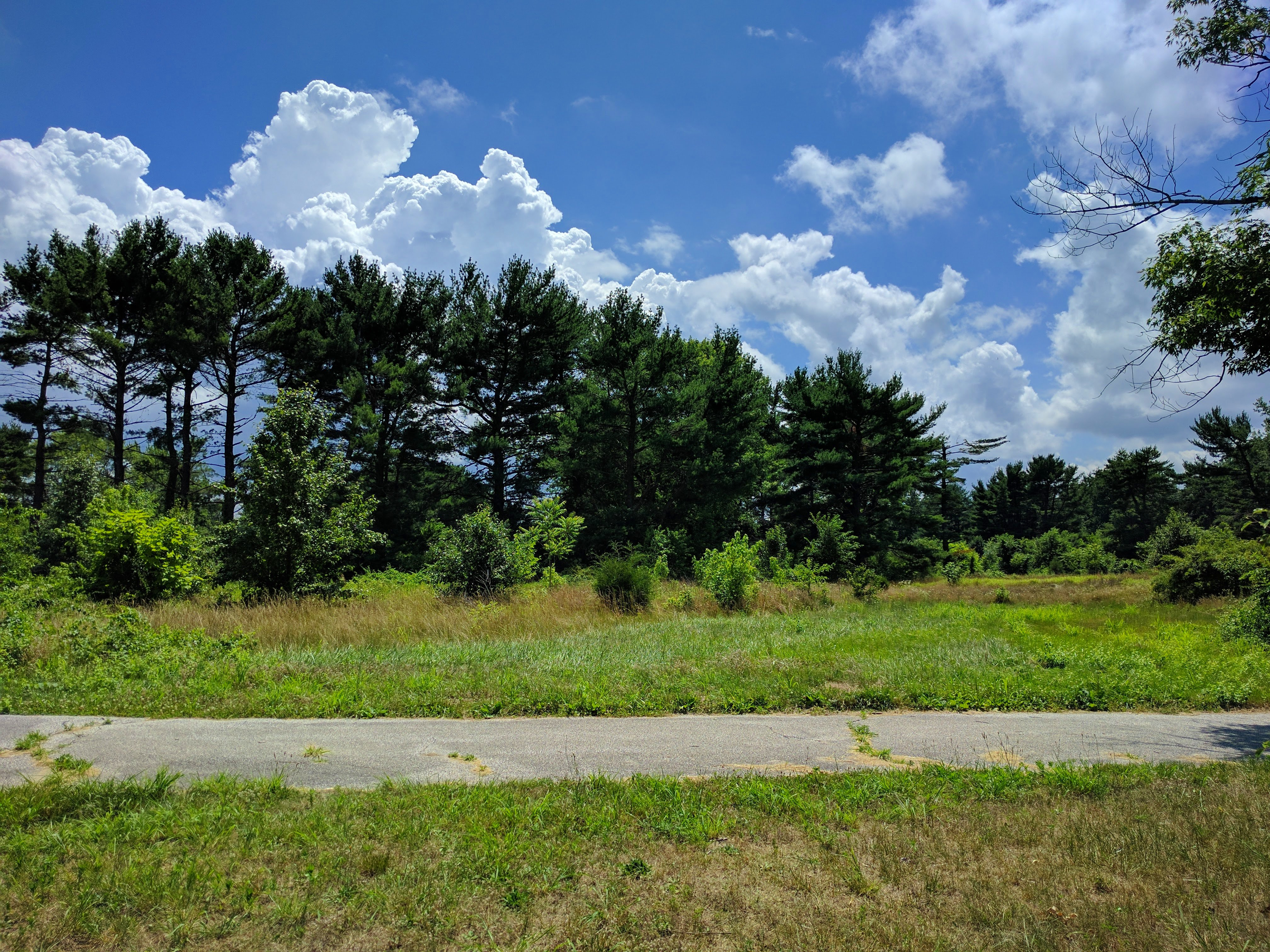

- Location within New Jersey Location within the United States
- Location: Deptford Township, Mantua
- Nearest town: Wenonah, New Jersey
- Coordinates: 39°46′41″N 75°08′31″W
- Area: 110 acre
- Opened: 2015
- Owner: [[]]
- Operator: Gloucester County
- Hiking trails: 4 miles, asphalt/grass
- Website: Official website

Tall Pines State Preserve is a 110-acre (45 ha) nature preserve in Gloucester County, New Jersey. The preserve opened in November 2015 as the first state park in Gloucester County. It is located on Bark Bridge Road in Deptford Township and the Sewell section of Mantua Township.

The project was a cooperative effort of the South Jersey Land and Water Trust, the Friends of Tall Pines, Gloucester County Nature Club, and the New Jersey Green Acres Program.

== Overview ==
The preserve is open to walking, birdwatching, running, cycling, and picnics. The land serves as a natural filter for the local water supply.

== History ==
The land that became the Tall Pines State Preserve was covered by forest until the early 1950s, when it was developed into a golf course. In 2006, the property was sold to a development company, at which point funds were raised to buy it for the purposes of creating the preserve.
