= Barnsboro Hotel =

- U.S. National Register of Historic Places
- New Jersey Register of Historic Places
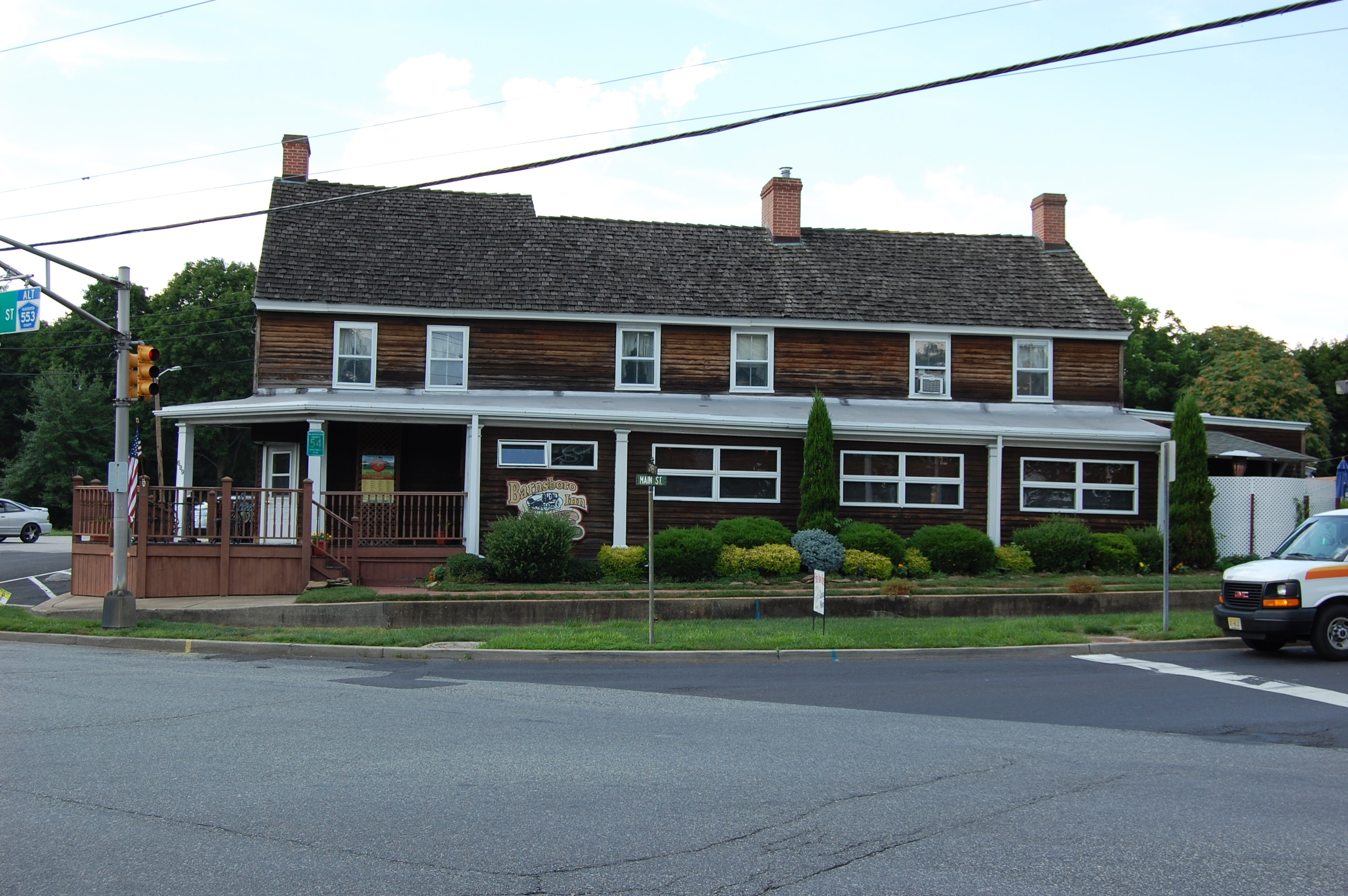

- Location within Gloucester County, New Jersey Location within New Jersey Location within the United States
- Location: Pitman and Sewell roads, Mantua Township, NJ 08051
- Coordinates: 39°45′42″N 75°9′37″W
- Area: 1.2 acres (0.49 ha)
- Built: 1720
- NRHP reference No.: 73001095
- NJRHP No.: 1399

Significant dates
- Added to NRHP: January 25, 1973
- Designated NJRHP: May 1, 1972

Barnsboro Hotel is located in Mantua Township, Gloucester County, New Jersey. The hotel was built in 1720 and was added to the National Register of Historic Places on January 25, 1973.

== See also ==
- National Register of Historic Places listings in Gloucester County, New Jersey
