= Sewell, New Jersey =

Place in Gloucester County, New Jersey, United States

- Census-designated place
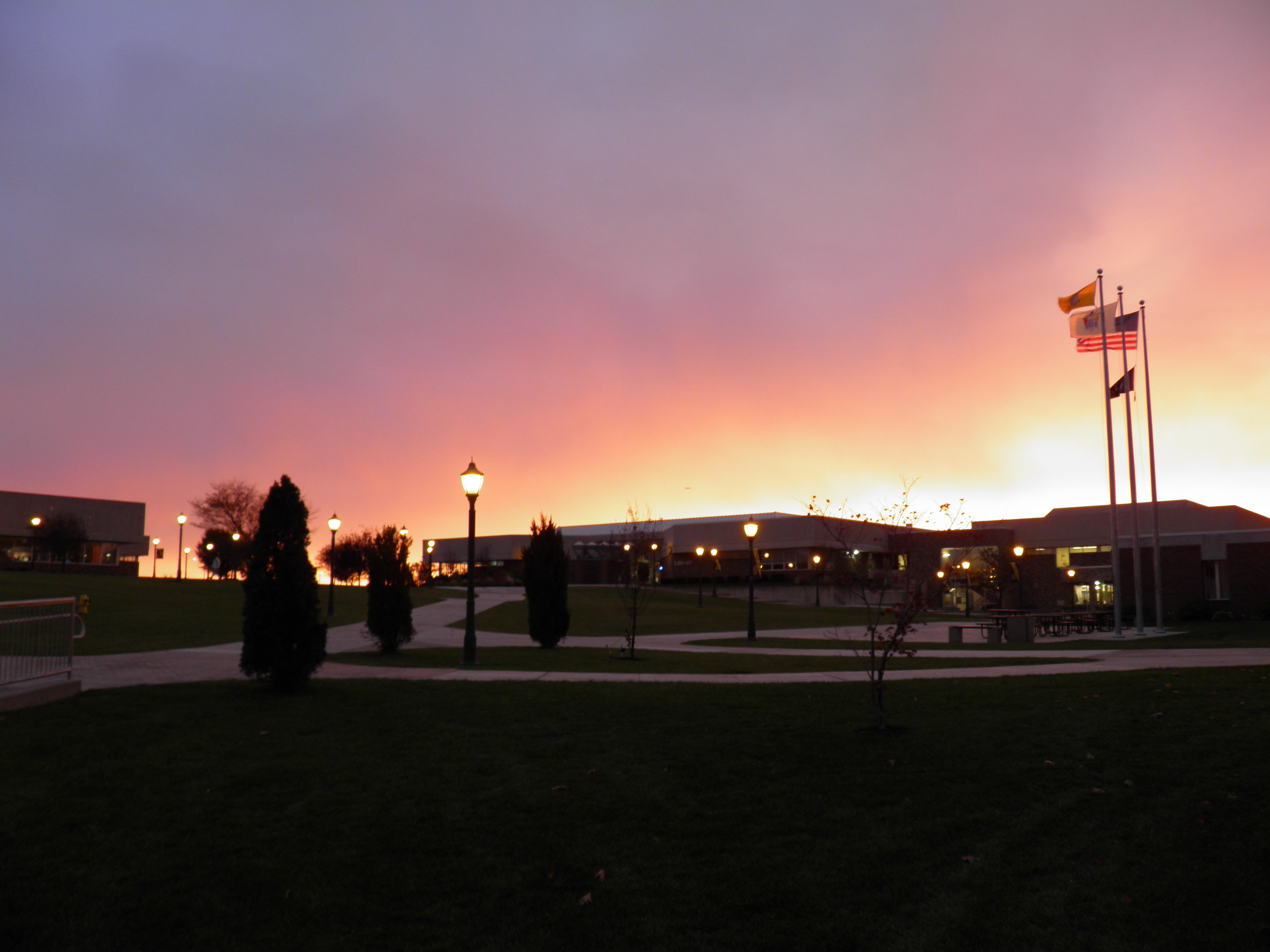
- Rowan College of South Jersey in Sewell at dusk in 2010

- Location in Gloucester County Location in New Jersey Location in the United States
- Coordinates: 39°45′59″N 75°08′40″W
- Country: United States
- State: New Jersey
- County: Gloucester
- Township: Mantua (CDP); Washington Township (not in the CDP)
- Named for: William Joyce Sewell
- Elevation: 66 ft (20 m)

Population (2020)
  - Total: 3,346
- ZIP Code: 08080
- FIPS code: 34-66750
- GNIS feature ID: 0880486

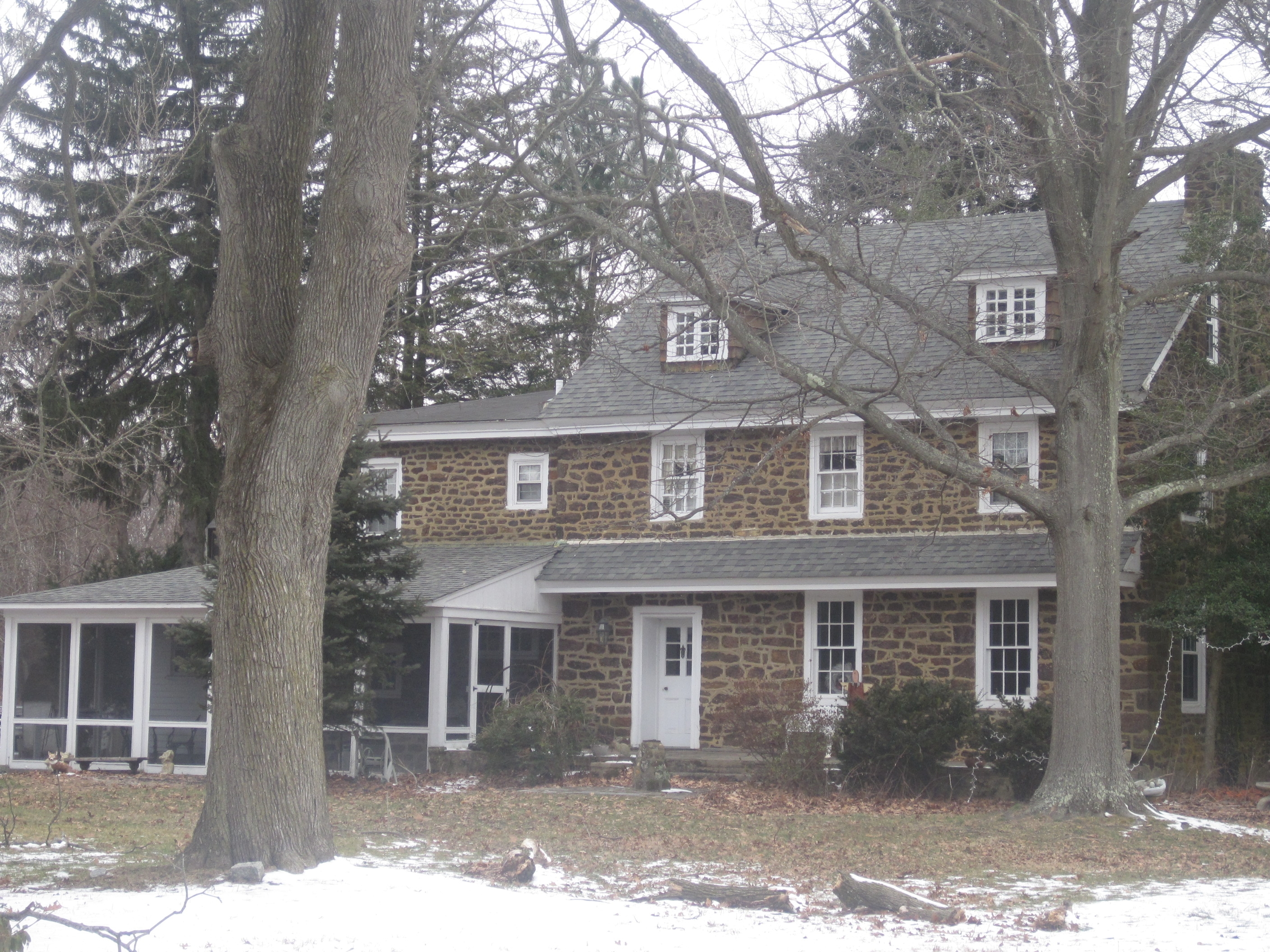
The historic Jesse Chew House, built in 1772

Historical population
Census	Pop.	Note	%±
2020	3,346		—

Sewell (/ˈsuːl/ SOOL) is a census-designated place (CDP) and unincorporated community within Mantua Township, Gloucester County, in the U.S. state of New Jersey, within the Philadelphia metropolitan area. There are also areas around Sewell in Washington Township.

As of the 2020 United States census, the CDP's population was 3,346. The CDP was named after United States Senator William Joyce Sewell. The community is served as U.S. Postal Service ZIP Code 08080. Sewell is home to Rowan College of South Jersey.

Sewell is also the site of the Inversand marl pit, the last operational greensand mine in the world. The location has become renowned for its paleontology and is similar to many of the sites studied by early paleontologists, particularly Edward Drinker Cope. It is also home to the Barnsboro Inn, the oldest bar in New Jersey.

That Inversand pit is now the site of the Edelman Fossil Park & Museum of Rowan University. Rowan purchased the quarry from the Inversand Company in 2015 and developed the 65-acre (26 ha) site, in Mantua Township, into a fossil park and museum under paleontologist Kenneth Lacovara. The $73 million museum, funded in part by a $25 million gift from Rowan alumni Jean and Ric Edelman, opened to the public on March 29, 2025, overlooking the quarry where visitors can dig for 66-million-year-old fossils.

== Demographics ==
Sewell was first listed as a census designated place in the 2020 census.

=== Racial and ethnic composition ===
Sewell CDP, New Jersey – Racial and ethnic composition Note: the US Census treats Hispanic/Latino as an ethnic category. This table excludes Latinos from the racial categories and assigns them to a separate category. Hispanics/Latinos may be of any race.
Race / Ethnicity (NH = Non-Hispanic)	Pop 2020	2020
White alone (NH)	2,958	88.40%
Black or African American alone (NH)	83	2.48%
Native American or Alaska Native alone (NH)	8	0.24%
Asian alone (NH)	37	1.11%
Native Hawaiian or Pacific Islander alone (NH)	0	0.00%
Other race alone (NH)	8	0.24%
Mixed race or Multiracial (NH)	123	3.68%
Hispanic or Latino (any race)	129	3.86%
Total	3,346	100.00%

=== 2020 census ===
As of the 2020 census, Sewell had a population of 3,346. The median age was 41.1 years. 22.4% of residents were under the age of 18 and 15.1% of residents were 65 years of age or older. For every 100 females there were 100.1 males, and for every 100 females age 18 and over there were 101.6 males age 18 and over.

100.0% of residents lived in urban areas, while 0.0% lived in rural areas.

There were 1,197 households in Sewell, of which 35.2% had children under the age of 18 living in them. Of all households, 58.6% were married-couple households, 15.9% were households with a male householder and no spouse or partner present, and 19.7% were households with a female householder and no spouse or partner present. About 19.5% of all households were made up of individuals and 8.1% had someone living alone who was 65 years of age or older.

There were 1,228 housing units, of which 2.5% were vacant. The homeowner vacancy rate was 1.3% and the rental vacancy rate was 1.0%.

== Parks and recreation ==
Tall Pines State Preserve is a 111-acre (45 ha) nature preserve that opened in November 2015 as Gloucester County's first state park and is located along the border of Deptford Township and Mantua Township. Originally a forest that was turned into an asparagus field and then a golf course, the land was preserved through the efforts of the South Jersey Land and Water Trust, the Friends of Tall Pines, Gloucester County Nature Club, and the New Jersey Green Acres Program.

== Transportation ==
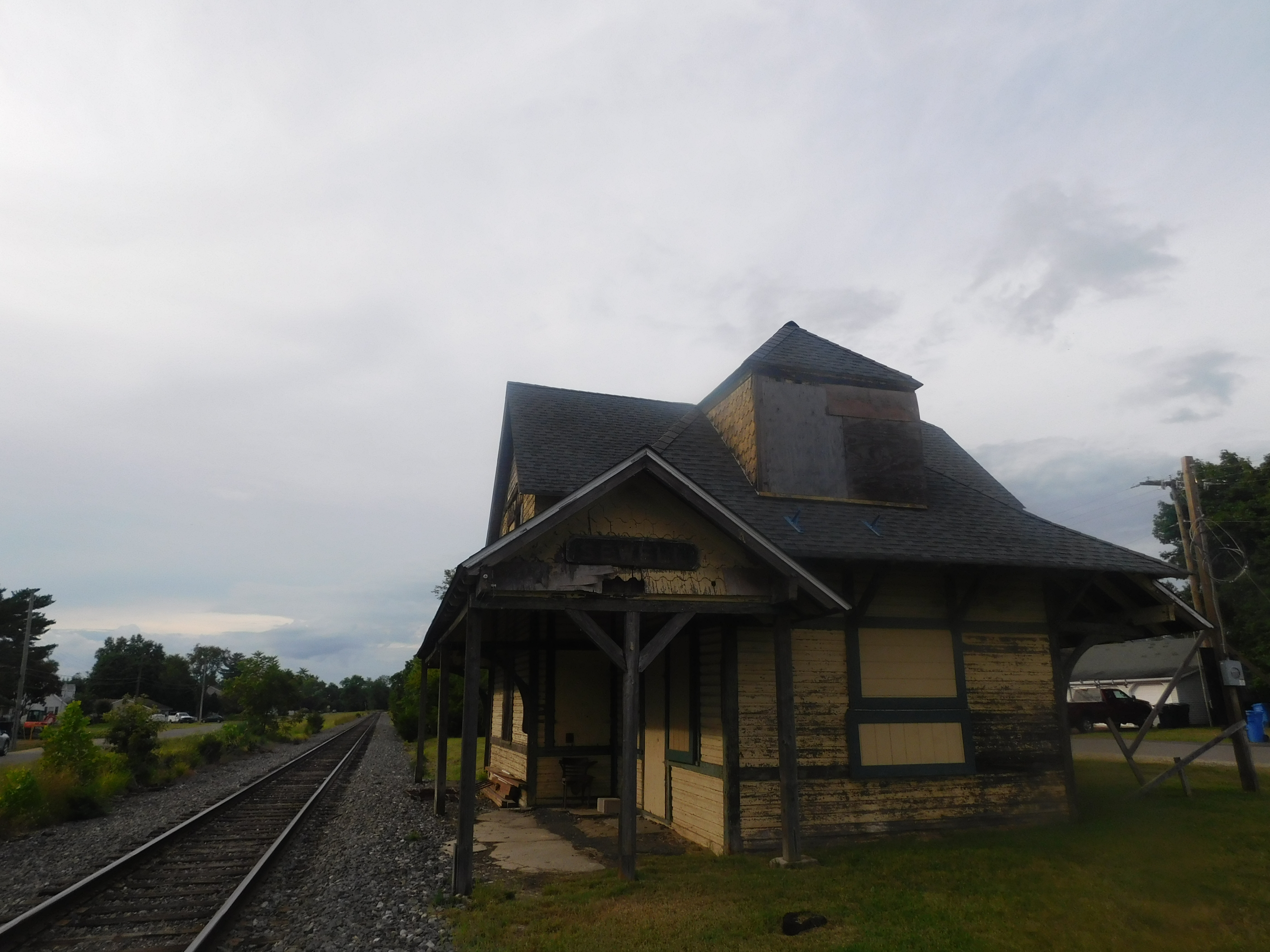
The former Pennsylvania Railroad station in Sewell

The community is a planned stop on the Glassboro–Camden Line, a proposed 18-mile (28.97 km) diesel multiple unit (DMU) light rail line.

== Education ==
The CDP, entirely in Mantua Township, is within Mantua Township School District (elementary school) and Clearview Regional High School District. Clearview Regional High School is the comprehensive high school of the latter district.

== Notable people ==
People (and pets) who were born in, residents of, or otherwise closely associated with Sewell include:

- Tony DeAngelo (born 1995), NHL defenseman for the New York Islanders
- Ryan D'Imperio (born 1987), former NFL fullback for the Minnesota Vikings
- Elwood (c. 2005–2013), the winner of the World's Ugliest Dog Contest in 2007
- Sam Esmail (born 1977), screen director and producer, Mr. Robot and Homecoming
- Tara Lipinski (born 1982), Olympic gold medal winner, figure skating
- John E. Wallace Jr. (born 1942), former Associate Justice of the New Jersey Supreme Court
- Amy Wang (born 2002), table tennis player who competed at the 2024 Summer Olympics
- John Zandig (born 1971), retired professional wrestler and original owner and founder of Newark, Delaware-based Combat Zone Wrestling (CZW)
