= Carpenter's Landing, New Jersey =

Populated place in Gloucester County, New Jersey, United States

Coordinates: 39.794875°N 75.171287°W

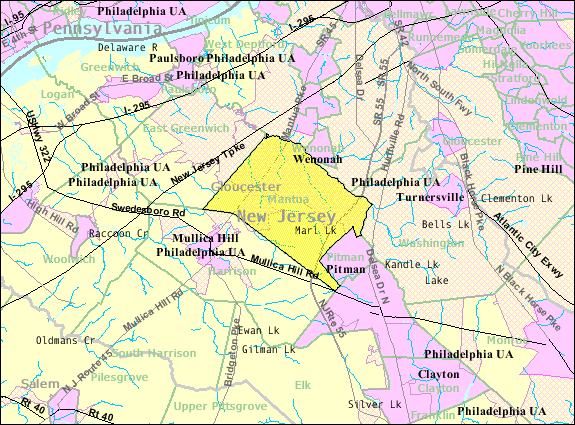
Map of Mantua Township, New Jersey

Carpenter's Landing was a mercantile settlement located at the head of sloop navigation on Mantua Creek in Mantua Township in Gloucester County, New Jersey.

In the late 1780s, Thomas Carpenter (1752-1847) moved to Carpenter's Landing and established a store and lumber business. In the 1860s, it was described as "a place of considerable trade in lumber, cordwood, etc., and contains one tavern, two stores, 30 dwellings and a Methodist church". The landing is said to have been named either for a man named Carpenter who built boats at the site during its mercantile boom days, or Edward Carpenter, son of Thomas Carpenter and descendant of Samuel Carpenter of Philadelphia, Pennsylvania, who owned the Heston & Carpenter Glass Works in nearby Glassboro, New Jersey, in 1786 in partnership with Col. Thomas Heston, his wife's nephew.

== Notable people ==
People who were born in, residents of, or otherwise closely associated with Carpenter's Landing include:

- Thomas Carpenter (1752–1847), early American glassmaker.

== See also ==
- New Bridge Landing
- Raritan Landing
