= Arch Street Friends Meeting House =

Historic church in Pennsylvania, United States

- Arch Street Meeting House
- U.S. National Register of Historic Places
- U.S. National Historic Landmark
- Pennsylvania state historical marker
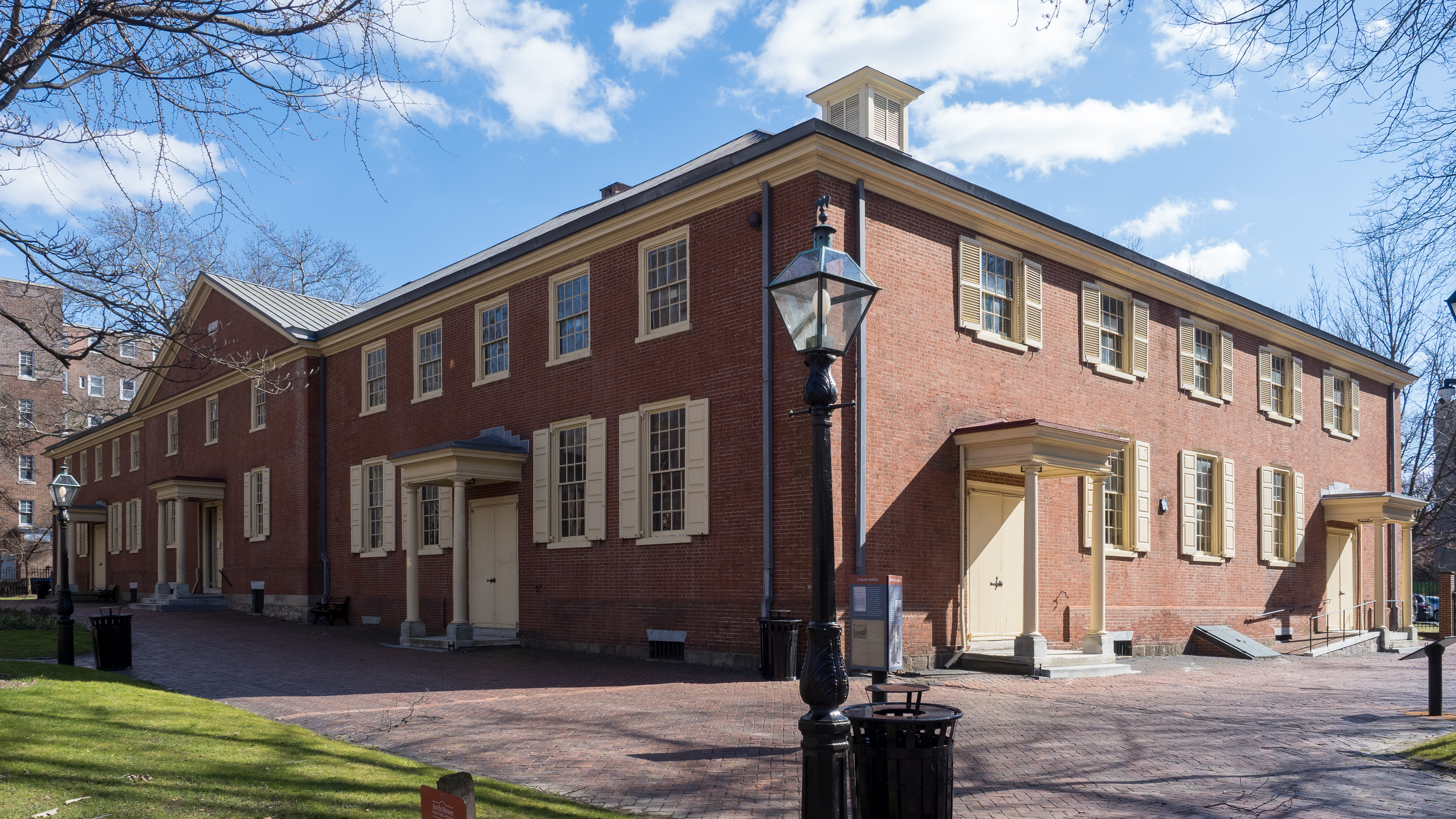
- Arch Street Friends Meeting House in 2024

- Location within Philadelphia Location within Pennsylvania Location within the United States
- Location: 320 Arch Street, Philadelphia, Pennsylvania
- Coordinates: 39°57′7.2″N 75°8′45.9414″W
- Built: 1803–05, 1810–11
- Architect: Owen Biddle Jr. (central structure and east wing)
- NRHP reference No.: 71000716

Significant dates
- Added to NRHP: May 27, 1971
- Designated NHL: June 23, 2011
- Designated PHMC: December 17, 1954

The Arch Street Meeting House, at 320 Arch Street at the corner of 4th Street in the Old City neighborhood of Philadelphia, Pennsylvania, is a Friends meeting house of the Religious Society of Friends (Quakers). Built to reflect Friends' testimonies of simplicity and equality, this building is little changed after more than two centuries of continuous use.

Pennsylvania founder and Quaker William Penn deeded land to the Society of Friends in 1701 to be used as a burial ground. The east wing and center of the meetinghouse was built between 1803 and 1805 according to a design by the Quaker master-builder Owen Biddle Jr. Biddle is best known as the author of a builder's handbook, The Young Carpenter's Assistant, published in 1805. The building was enlarged in 1810–11, with the addition of the west wing. Architects Walter Ferris Price and Morris & Erskine also contributed to the design and construction of the building. The firm Cope & Lippincott renovated the interior of the east wing and designed the two-story addition behind the center building in 1968–69.

Today, the Meeting House continues to be a center for worship and the activities of the Monthly Meeting of Friends of Philadelphia and Philadelphia Yearly Meeting.

Notable members of the Religious Society of Friends who worshiped at this meetinghouse include abolitionists and woman rights advocates, Sarah and Angelina Grimke. Edward Hicks, the noted painter and cousin of Elias Hicks, also attended meeting here.

The meetinghouse was listed on the National Register of Historic Places in 1971 and declared a National Historic Landmark in 2011. The latter designation was as a consequence of the building being the only surviving documented work by Owen Biddle.

== Historical museum ==
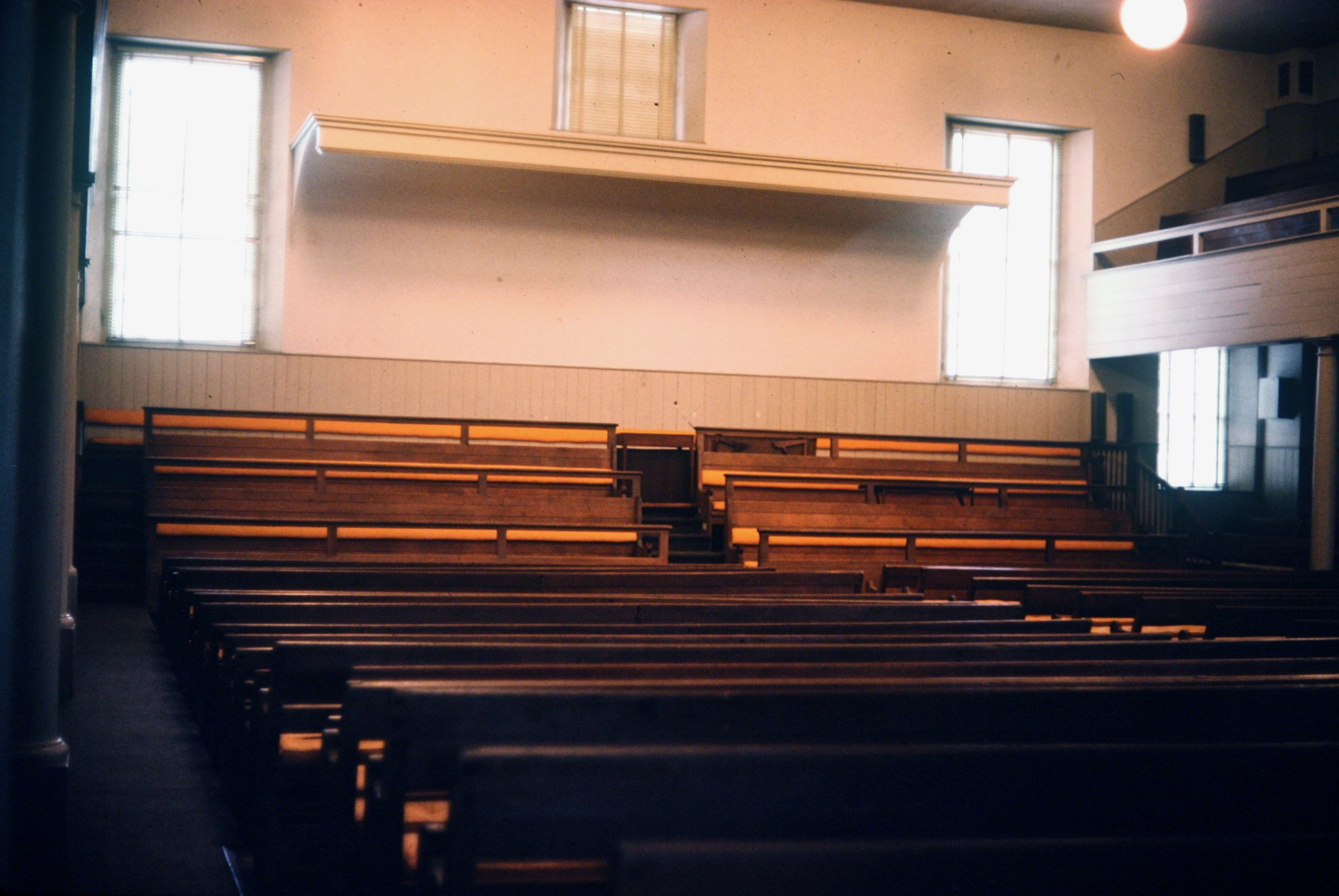
Sounding board and facing benches in East Room of Arch Street Friends Meeting House, c. 1970

The Arch Street Meeting House Preservation Trust, an entity of Philadelphia Yearly Meeting, has responsibility for the building and grounds. Its mission is to “preserve, operate, and interpret the meeting house and grounds which will serve to increase public understanding of the impact and continued relevance of Quakers and Quaker history.”

The East Room has dioramas representing significant events of the Quaker experience in Pennsylvania and North America as well as artifacts offering views into common experiences of Friends. The West Room, still used for large Quaker gatherings and private events, features interpretive panels about Friends’ worship. Notable in the West Room is the sounding board on the south wall, amplifying the voices of Friends seated on benches facing the congregation so that they could be heard throughout the balconied room.

The Reception Room in the center of the building has display cases which change seasonally as well as a small collection of religious books on open shelves.

The Meeting Room is used by the Monthly Meeting of Friends of Philadelphia for weekly worship services and is often open to view. Notable in this room are the horsehair-filled bench cushions.

The building’s basement has restrooms, and its second floor houses administrative offices and private meeting rooms not open to the public.

The building is open seasonally from Thursday to Sunday. The grounds are open from 9 am to dusk year round.

Arch Street Meeting House is featured on the cover of the 2018 edition of Faith and Practice, Philadelphia Yearly Meeting's book of discipline (standards and practices).

A Pennsylvania Historical and Museum Commission marker is located at the front of the building. It was dedicated on December 17, 1954.

== Place of worship ==
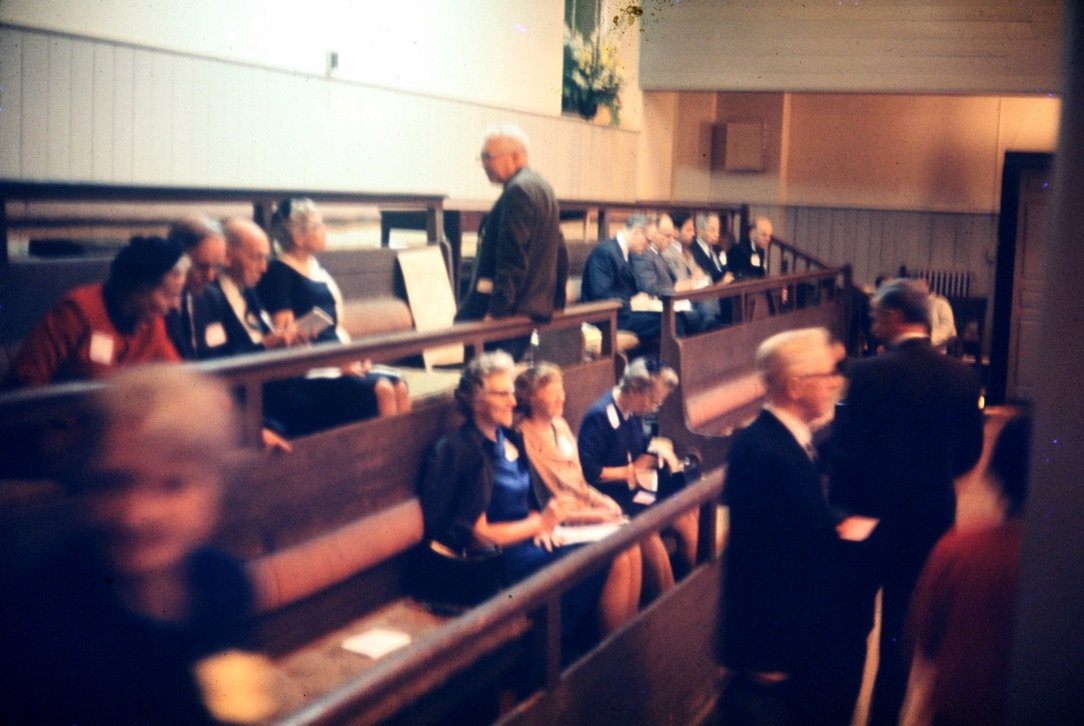
Friends in annual sessions at Arch Street Meeting House, c. 1970

The Arch Street Meeting House is a landmark building within the over 100 monthly meetings of Philadelphia Yearly Meeting. For most of the 19th and 20th centuries, Friends came from Philadelphia Yearly Meeting’s four-state geographic area to conduct annual business at its midsummer “sessions”. The meeting house was also the home of the Monthly Meeting of Friends of Philadelphia, which has met here since its completion in 1805.

As of 2024, the Monthly Meeting of Friends of Philadelphia has two weekly meetings for worship. Philadelphia Yearly Meeting holds two of its three annual business meetings, known as “continuing sessions”, in the West Room. Because of its central location and historic significance, Friends meet at Arch Street for other events during the year.

== Revitalization ==
The trustees of the Preservation Trust initiated a program in 2022 to revitalize the building’s infrastructure and exhibits. Because of its adjacency to the National Park Service’s Independence National Historical Park, the Trust incorporated local architectural, historic, and NPS standards into the planning process as well as Friends’ own attention to energy conservation.

As of 2024, work is underway to increase the electrical service to the building to permit conversion of its gas boiler to an efficient heating and cooling system. Lighting will be improved and the fire suppression system will be upgraded. In the East Room, the exhibits will be refreshed to offer a more contemporary and inclusive interpretation of the Quaker experience and the testimonies of Friends.

== Notable interments ==
The ground upon which the meetinghouse was built was the first burial ground for Quakers in Philadelphia. Although the plot was officially given to the Society of Friends by William Penn in 1701, burials had been taking place here since as early as 1683. According to reports, Quakers were buried here alongside of “Indians, Blacks and strangers.”

Notable interments include:

- Charles Brockden Brown (1771–1810), the first American novelist (Wieland)
- Samuel Carpenter (1649–1714) and most of his family and his brother Abraham Carpenter (a non-member who married a Quaker) were buried in the Friends Burial Ground. Samuel was a Deputy Governor under William Penn and the "First Treasurer" of Pennsylvania.
- Lydia Darrah (1728–1789), Revolutionary War spy
- John Eckley (1652–1690), First purchaser, merchant, and judge of the Provincial Court in Philadelphia
- James Logan (1674–1751), secretary to William Penn
- Samuel Nicholas (1744–1790), founder and first commandant of the United States Marine Corps. Each November 10, Marines mark his grave with a wreath at dawn.
- Robert Waln (1765–1836), U.S. Congressman
- Caspar Wistar (1761–1818), American physician, professor of anatomy and vice president of the American Philosophical Society. Wistar mentored Meriwether Lewis before Lewis joined William Clark on the expedition to cross the western part of the continent.
- Thomas Wynne (1627–1691), personal physician to William Penn and one of the original settlers of Philadelphia in the colonial-era Province of Pennsylvania. Born in Wales, he accompanied Penn on his original journey to America on the ship Welcome.

== Gallery ==
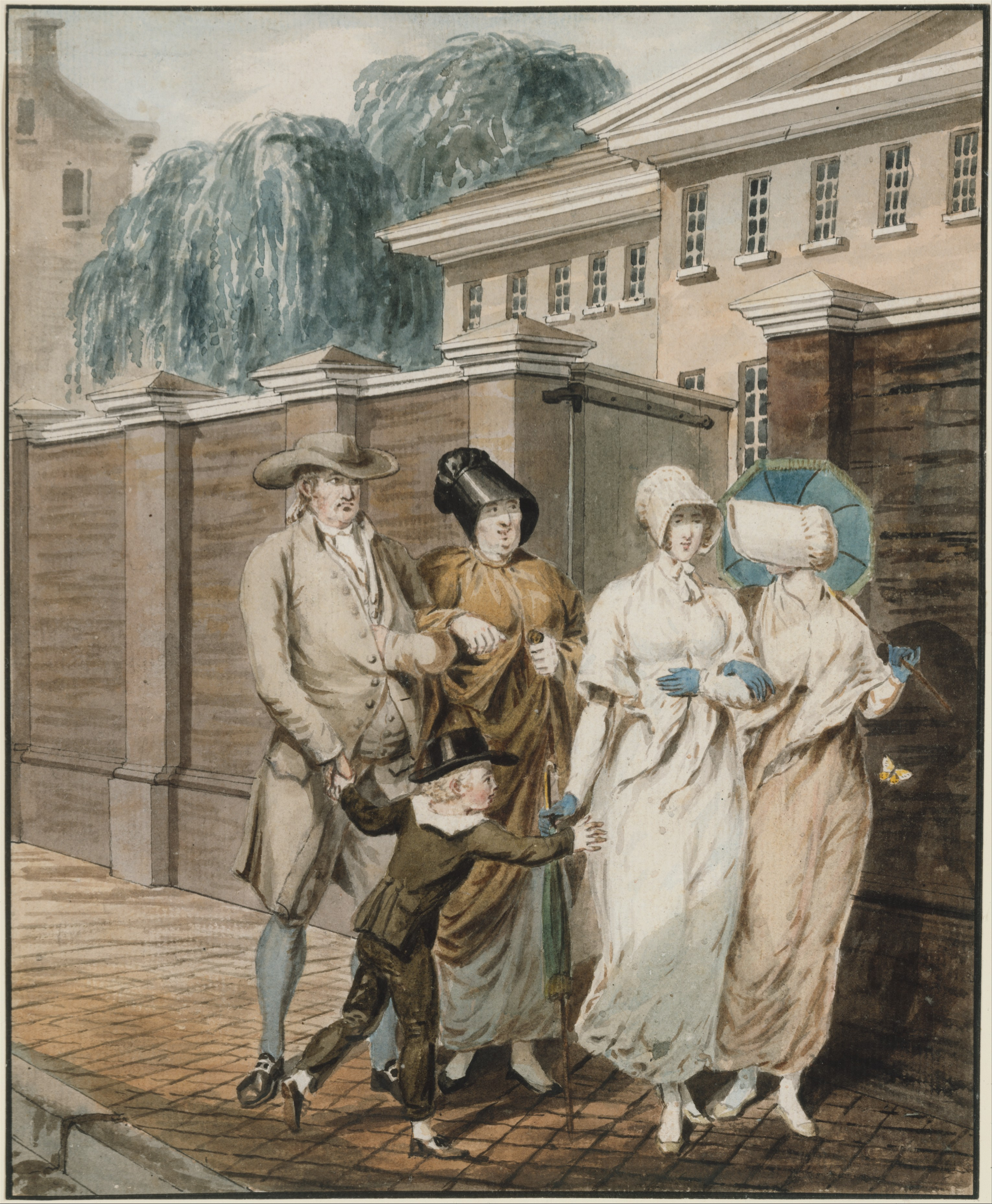
John Lewis Krimmel, Sunday Morning (ca.1813)

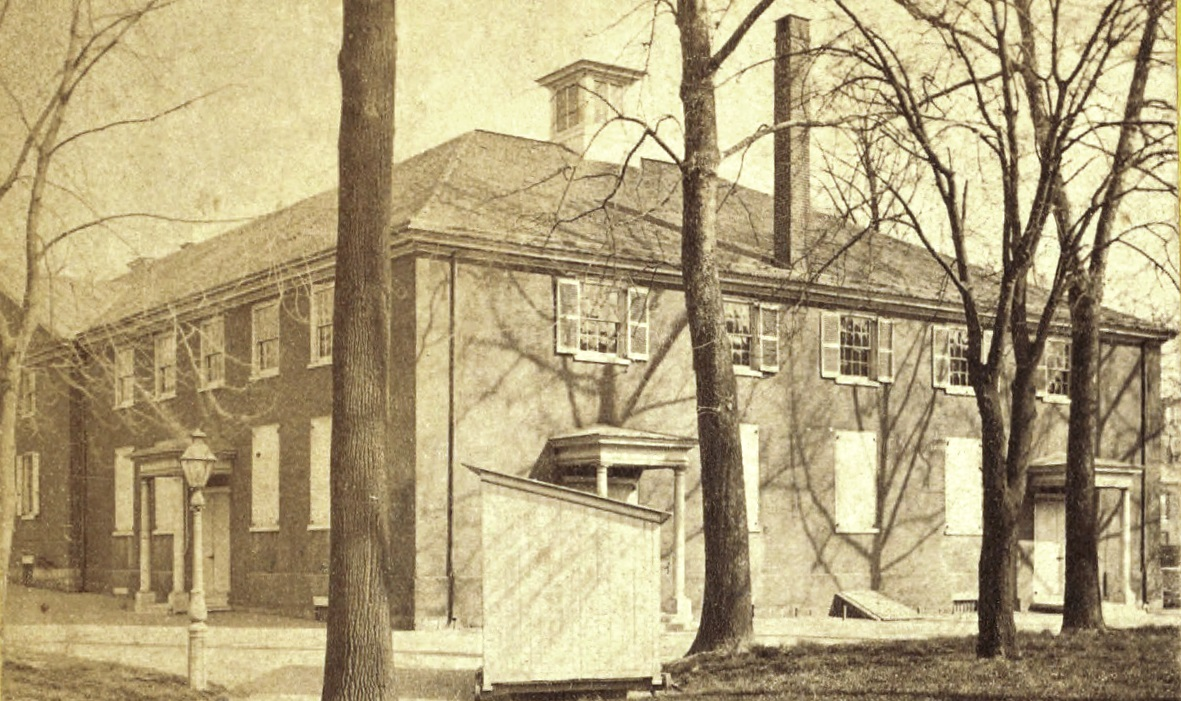
In the late 19th century

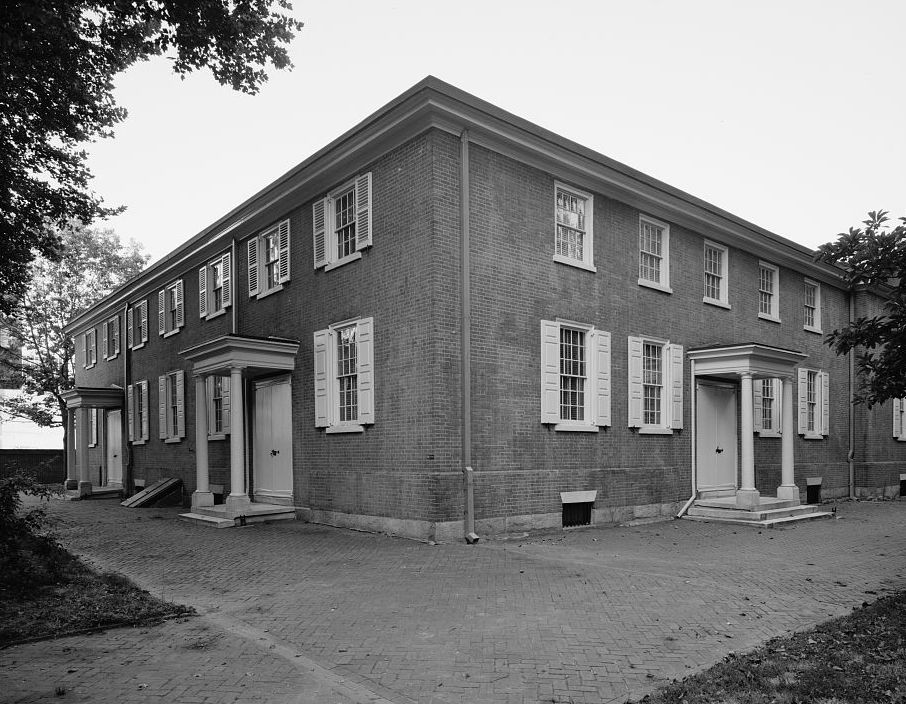
The northwest corner (1974), photo by Jack E. Boucher

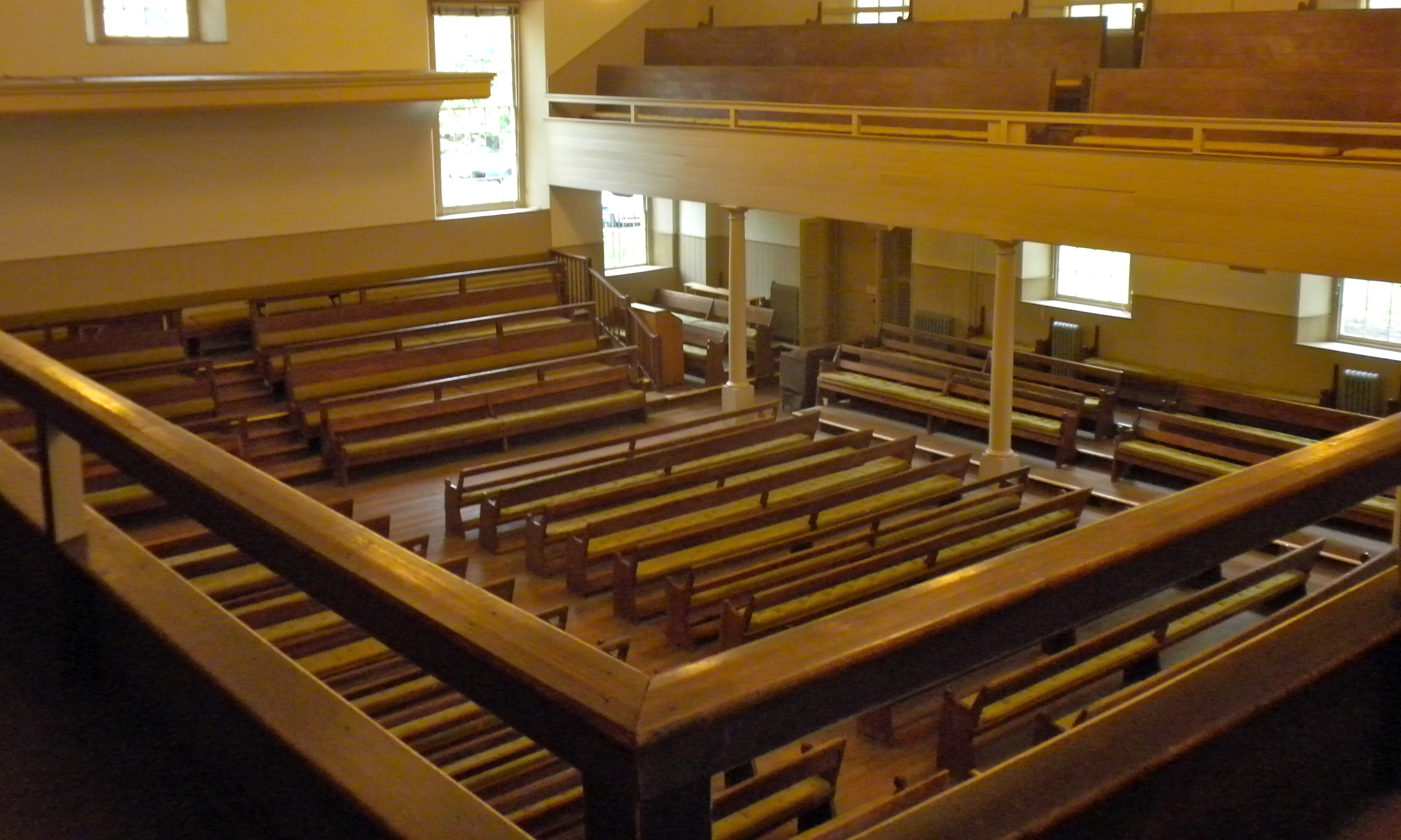
Interior (2010)

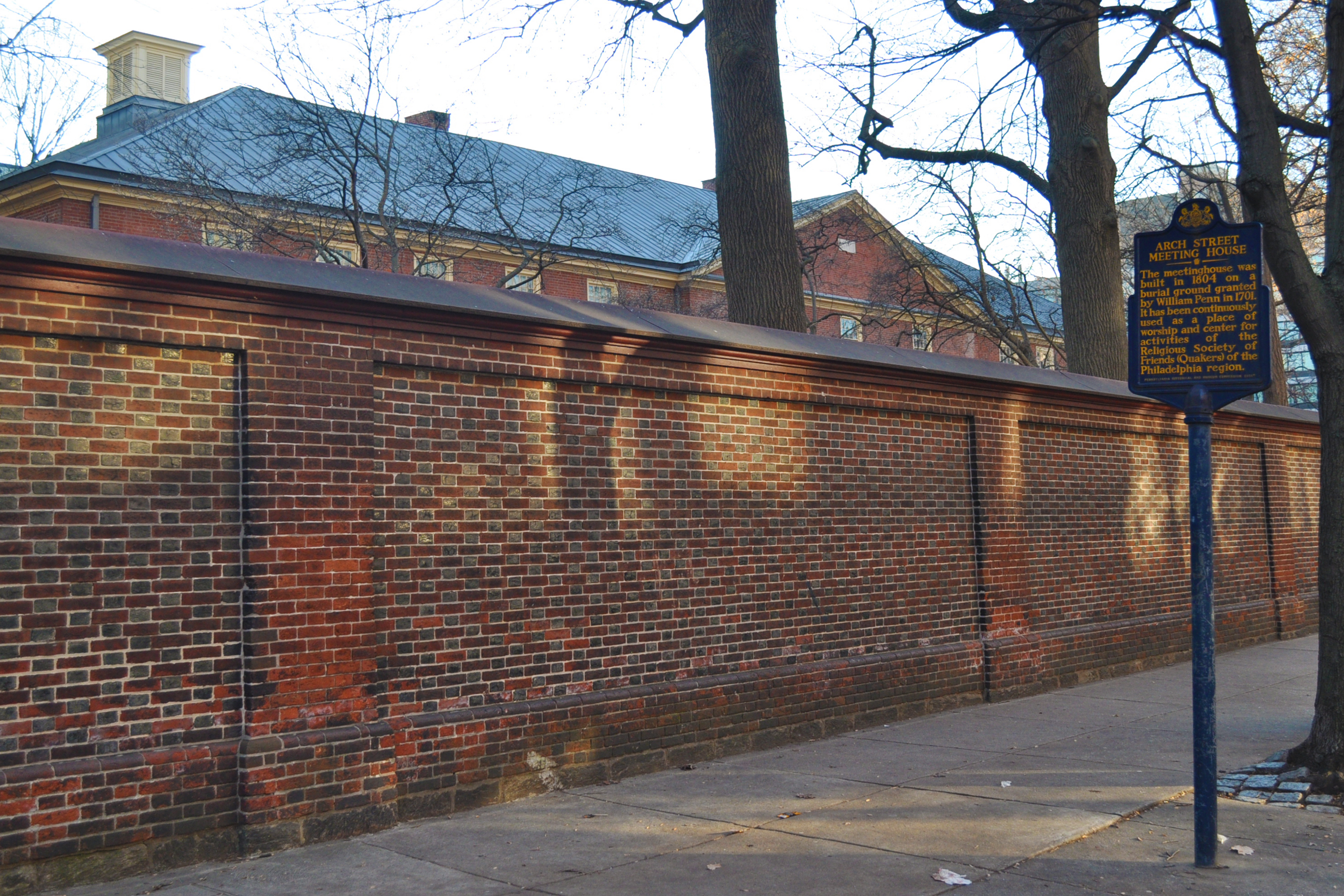
Historical marker

== See also ==
- List of National Historic Landmarks in Philadelphia
- National Register of Historic Places listings in Center City, Philadelphia
- Race Street Friends Meetinghouse
