= Thomas Carpenter (glassmaker) =

American soldier and glassmaker

- Born: November 2, 1752; Salem, New Jersey, British America
- Died: July 7, 1847 (aged 94); Carpenter's Landing, New Jersey, U.S.
- Burial place: Friends Meeting House Burial Ground, Woodbury, New Jersey, U.S.
- Military career
- Allegiance: United States of America
- Branch: Department of War–Continental Army
- Service years: 1776–1782
- Rank: Colonel
- Nickname: "The Fighting Quaker"
- Units: New Jersey Continental Line & New Jersey Militia
- Commands: Commissary, Paymaster & Quartermaster
- Conflicts: American Revolutionary War, Patriot
- Other work: Glass Manufacturer

Thomas Carpenter (November 2, 1752 at Salem, New Jersey – July 7, 1847 at Carpenter's Landing, New Jersey) was an early American glassmaker and devout Quaker who, at significant spiritual and personal risk, found an important way to assist the American Revolutionary War, serving in the militia and the New Jersey Continental Line as what would today be called a logistics officer and earning the title of "Fighting Quaker." After the war, he contributed significantly to the rise of New Jersey glass production.

== Family ==
Carpenter was the sixth child and second son of Preston Carpenter (1721-1785) and Hannah Smith (1723-abt 1766?).

Carpenter served an apprenticeship in an auction store at Front and South Street in Philadelphia. As auctions were then prohibited within city limits, they were held at the southern city limits. Carpenter learned to pack, transport, issue, auction, then repack and re-transport many wagons several times each week. On April 13, 1774, he married Mary Tonkin (1748-1822) at St. Mary's Church, Burlington, Salem County, New Jersey. Mary had been raised an Episcopalian but later converted to the Society of Friends. They had at least three children who lived to maturity.

In the book Samuel Carpenter and his Descendants, Thomas Carpenter is described as "about 5'10" high, with a large frame but not corpulent, erect, well-formed, with a fine ruddy complexion. His eyes were blue, hair thin, but not bald, originally brown, and though tinged with gray, never became white. His affable and genial manners, anecdotes, and reminiscences made his society very attractive. He was fond of reading, intelligent, and self-possessed." The same book refers to Mary Tonkin Carpenter as "a little below medium height, with dark hazel eyes, brown hair, and a fine clear brunette complexion. Her figure was good, erect, well-proportioned, inclined to embonpoint, and she is reputed to have been very handsome." Thomas and Mary are interred in the Friend's Burial Grounds next to the Friend's Meeting House at Woodbury, N.J. Their graves adjoin each other on the north side of the enclosure, about midway, near the boundary fence, each designated with a small marble marker with their name on its top. In 1912, a stone retaining wall was placed there for the protection of the graves.

Carpenter was the great-grandson of Samuel Carpenter (1649-1714), Deputy Governor of colonial Pennsylvania. In 1771 he transferred his church membership from the Salem, New Jersey Friends Meeting House to the Philadelphia Friends Meeting House. He returned to New Jersey prior to April 13, 1774, the date on which he married in Salem to Mary Tonkin of Gloucester County, New Jersey.

== Revolutionary conflict ==
Carpenter was a member of the Society of Friends, or Quakers which influenced, and distinguishes, his non-combat service in the Revolutionary War. Because of their refusal to pay military taxes or fight in the war, Quakers, who had been generally admired for their honesty and simple living in the North American colonies, were looked upon differently when the Revolutionary War broke out, and some were exiled for their beliefs. Some Quakers chose to support the wartime effort, resulting in rifts within the Friends religion; some enlisted for military service, and were expelled from the Society. Some provided financial aid, medical assistance, or supplies at the individual or community level, and a few like Carpenter found ways to assist the combat effort at higher levels without bearing arms, as he did by serving in legal, financial, and logistical roles at the highest levels within a rebelling colony which bore a key central role in the Revolutionary War.

In late 1776, Carpenter was in a dilemma. As a Quaker, he was sworn to non-violence. He had a desire to assist, but not fight. In some manner he found a compromise. On March 19, 1777, he was commissioned paymaster of the militia units from Salem and Gloucester Counties. His earlier work in transporting auction material helped him in his military duties involving logistics. Carpenter served as an Ensign and Adjutant in Colonel Samuel Dick's Regiment, 1776–1778, and Paymaster for the New Jersey Militia. Later he was appointed Quartermaster of the First Battalion, New Jersey Continental Line, serving again under his friend Colonel Dick and others from 1778 through 1782. Carpenter's positional rank of Quartermaster in the New Jersey line unit was equal to the rank of colonel, which clarifies why he was called Colonel after the war.

During the American retreat from the banks of the Assunpink Creek on January 3, 1777, in the Second Battle of Trenton, Carpenter withdrew all of his supplies and assisted another unit to do likewise and then, exhausted, camped with them. He 'loaned' his coat to an officer who had misplaced his and bedded down in his blanket. Later that night, a messenger awoke them and informed them that they were now stragglers because the rest of the army had retreated. Suffering from the bitter cold without his coat, Carpenter made his way back to his unit. His actions helped General George Washington continue the fight threatening the rear area of the British forces.

After the fighting at the Battle of Princeton, Carpenter and Colonel Dick, who was a physician, went to the aid of their friend Brigadier General Hugh Mercer who had been beaten and bayoneted seven times then left for dead. After talking to Doctor Benjamin Rush, they acknowledged that infection would end their friend's life. They visited and did what they could, but Mercer died on January 12, 1777.

An example of a surviving document mentioning Carpenter is a dispatch dated at Burlington, January 17, 1780, from Light-horse Harry Lee to "Thomas Carpenter, purchasing commissioner" reading in part, "I have written to the Magistrates of Salem County begging them to aid you …" and ends with, "For God's sake perform this business with all possible dispatch."

== Post-revolution ==
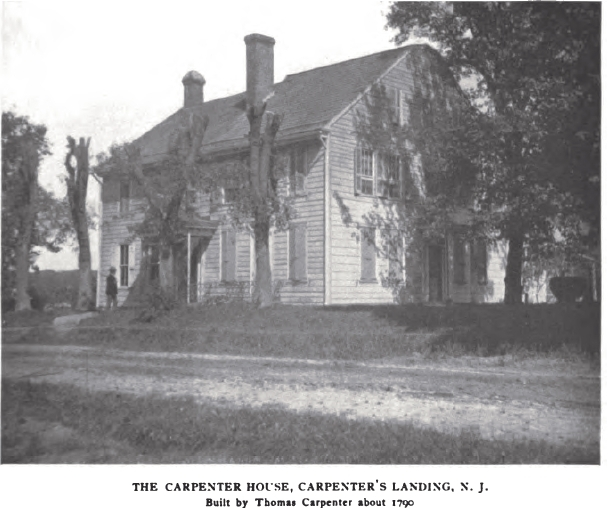
The historic Thomas Carpenter's house built in or prior to 1773 and expanded in 1787 at Carpenter's Landing, New Jersey.

In 1785 Carpenter moved to Cooper's Point and started a mercantile business. About two years later he formed a partnership with Thomas Heston, his wife's nephew by marriage and moved to Carpenter's Landing, New Jersey where he engaged in the manufacture of glass, and later at Glassboro, New Jersey with Colonel Thomas Heston. The partners were described as "two 'fighting Quakers' who had given gallant service for the American cause in the Revolution."

On May 18, 1808, after Heston's death and the retirement of Thomas Carpenter, Carpenter's son Edward acquired his father's share of the original Glassboro glassworks and the firm of Heston & Carpenter became known as Edward Carpenter & Co., Olive Works. He became one of the historic figures in the history of Glassboro and in the art and craft of glass making — the Heritage Glass Museum, founded in 1979 to celebrate glass blowing and glass art and noteworthy people in the history of glass making, includes him on its Who We Are webpage.

In 1787, Carpenter bought and restored a house in Mantua Township once owned by Restore Eastlack, who died in 1773. This indicates the original portion of the house was built during or prior to 1773. Carpenter added a southern half and a second story and lived there until his death in 1847. Today, it is known as the Thomas Carpenter House. While it is in private hands, the timber framed, two and one half story house is considered a historical site by Gloucester County, New Jersey and the Library of Congress. The house is located at the southwest corner of Main and Martel Streets in Mantua Township, New Jersey. The house does not seem to be registered with the National Register of Historic Places, but it has a Historic American Buildings Survey number: HABS NJ-68 and a Library of Congress call number of HABS NJ,8-MANT,1-

== See also ==
- List of people from New Jersey
- List of people with surname Carpenter
