= Mantua Township, New Jersey =

Township in Gloucester County, New Jersey, US

- Township
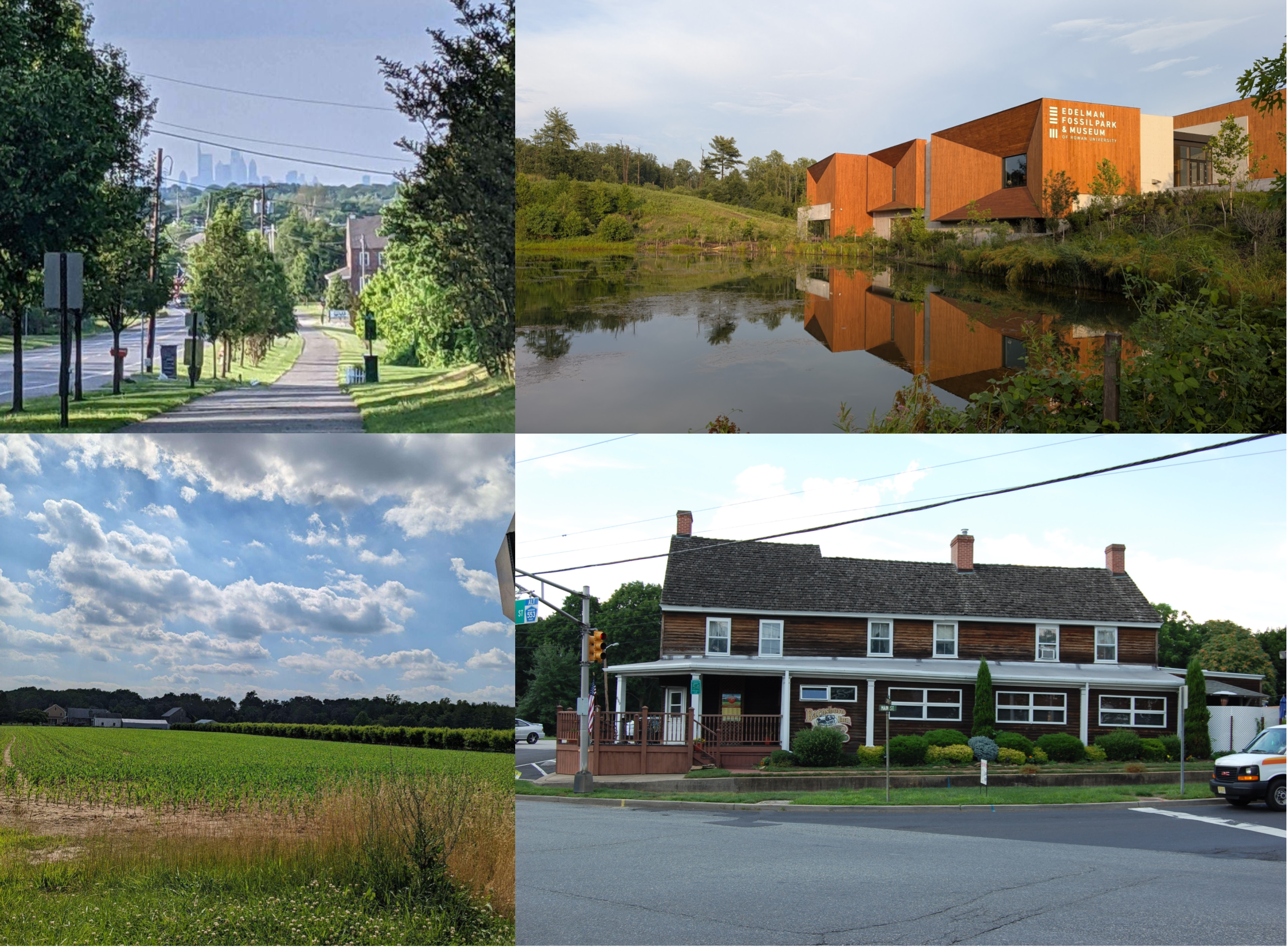
- Clockwise from top left: skyline of Philadelphia from Chestnut Branch Park, Edelman Fossil Park, Barnsboro Inn, farmland in the township

- Seal

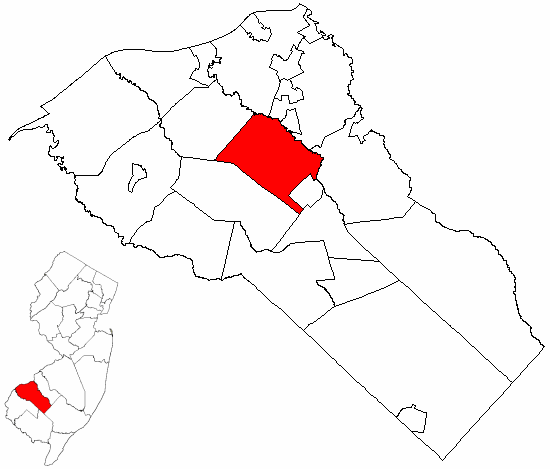
- Location of Mantua Township in Gloucester County highlighted in red (right). Inset map: Location of Gloucester County in New Jersey highlighted in red (left).

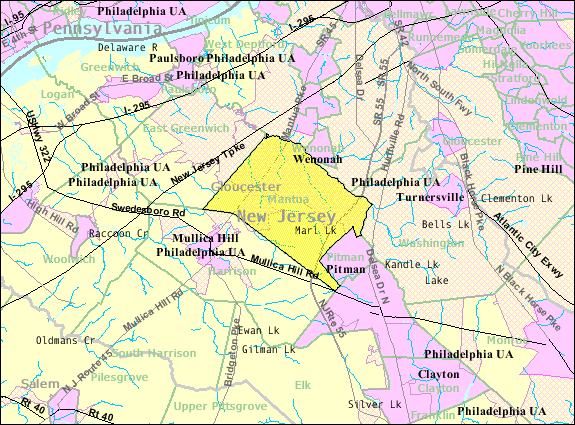
- Census Bureau map of Mantua Township, New Jersey

- Location in Gloucester County Location in New Jersey Location in the United States
- Coordinates: 39.762013°N 75.173092°W
- Country: United States
- State: New Jersey
- County: Gloucester
- Incorporated: February 23, 1853
- Named for: Manta sub-tribe of the Lenape

Government
  - Type: Township
  - Body: Township Committee
  - Mayor: Robert T. Zimmerman (D, term ends December 31, 2025)
  - Administrator: Jennica Bileci
  - Municipal clerk: Jennica Bileci

Area
  - Total: 16.09 sq mi (41.67 km^{2})
  - Land: 16.00 sq mi (41.45 km^{2})
  - Water: 0.085 sq mi (0.22 km^{2}) 0.53%
  - Rank: 169th of 565 in state 10th of 24 in county
- Elevation: 105 ft (32 m)

Population (2020)
  - Total: 15,235
  - Estimate (2023): 15,446
  - Rank: 172nd of 565 in state 7th of 24 in county
  - Density: 951.9/sq mi (367.5/km^{2})
  - Rank: 391st of 565 in state 15th of 24 in county
- Time zone: UTC−05:00 (Eastern (EST))
  - Summer (DST): UTC−04:00 (Eastern (EDT))
- ZIP Code: 08051; Sewell - 08080
- Area code: 856
- FIPS code: 3401543440
- GNIS feature ID: 0882147
- Website: mantuatownship.com

Mantua Township (/mæntʃuə/ MAN-choo-uh) is a township within Gloucester County in the U.S. state of New Jersey, within the Philadelphia metropolitan area. As of the 2020 United States census, the township's population was 15,235, its highest decennial count ever and an increase of 18 (+0.1%) from the 15,217 recorded at the 2010 census, which in turn reflected an increase of 1,000 (+7.0%) from the 14,217 counted in the 2000 census. Mantua and surrounding Gloucester County constitute part of South Jersey.

== History ==
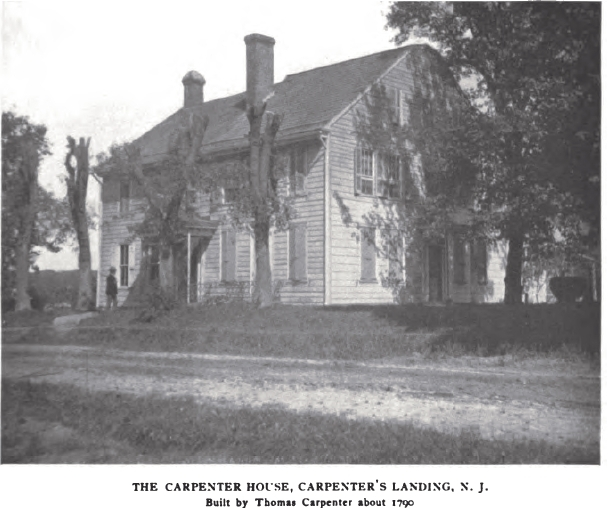
Thomas Carpenter House in Mantua Township, c. 1912

The area that would become Mantua Township was originally inhabited by the Lenape Native Americans. One subtribe, called the Manta or Mantes, lent their name to the Mantua Creek, the township’s namesake, forming its northeastern border. There is a widespread belief, including on the township's website, that the name Mantua means "frog" in the Lenape language, though the historical and linguistic evidence contradicts this claim. The modern spelling was possibly influenced or derived from Mantua, Italy.

Mantua Township was formed as a township by an act of the New Jersey Legislature on February 23, 1853, from portions of Greenwich Township. Portions of the township were taken to form East Greenwich Township (February 10, 1881) and Pitman (May 24, 1905).

== Geography ==
According to the U.S. Census Bureau, the township had a total area of 16.09 square miles (41.67 km^{2}), including 16.01 square miles (41.45 km^{2}) of land and 0.09 square miles (0.22 km^{2}) of water (0.53%).

Richwood is an unincorporated community and census-designated place (CDP) located within portions of both Harrison Township and Mantua Township. The CDP had a 2010 population of 3,459, of which 3,400 were in Harrison Township and 59 in Mantua Township. Other unincorporated communities, localities, and places located partially or completely within the township include Barnsboro, Boodys Mills, Carpenter's Landing, Centre City, Eastlack Corner, Jessups, Manunkachunk, Sewell, and West Landing.

The township borders Deptford Township, East Greenwich Township, Glassboro, Harrison Township, Pitman, Washington Township, Wenonah, and West Deptford Township.

== Demographics ==
Historical population
Census	Pop.	Note	%±
1860	1,742		—
1870	1,897		8.9%
1880	1,718		−9.4%
1890	1,791	*	4.2%
1900	2,101		17.3%
1910	1,529	*	−27.2%
1920	2,002		30.9%
1930	2,677		33.7%
1940	2,433		−9.1%
1950	3,548		45.8%
1960	7,991		125.2%
1970	9,643		20.7%
1980	9,193		−4.7%
1990	10,074		9.6%
2000	14,217		41.1%
2010	15,217		7.0%
2020	15,235		0.1%
2023 (est.)	15,446		1.4%
Population sources: 1860–2000 1860–1920; 1860–1870 1870 1880–1890; 1890–1910 1910–1930; 1940–2000 2000; 2010 2020 * Lost territory in previous decade

=== 2010 census ===
The 2010 United States census counted 15,217 people, 5,719 households, and 4,169 families in the township. The population density was 960.1 per square mile (370.7/km^{2}). There were 5,980 housing units at an average density of 377.3 per square mile (145.7/km^{2}). The racial makeup was 94.24% (14,340) White, 2.50% (380) Black or African American, 0.20% (31) Native American, 1.10% (168) Asian, 0.01% (1) Pacific Islander, 0.66% (100) from other races, and 1.29% (197) from two or more races. Hispanic or Latino of any race were 2.95% (449) of the population.

Of the 5,719 households, 33.4% had children under the age of 18; 57.3% were married couples living together; 11.1% had a female householder with no husband present and 27.1% were non-families. Of all households, 22.2% were made up of individuals and 8.8% had someone living alone who was 65 years of age or older. The average household size was 2.66 and the average family size was 3.13.

24.1% of the population were under the age of 18, 8.1% from 18 to 24, 25.4% from 25 to 44, 29.5% from 45 to 64, and 12.8% who were 65 years of age or older. The median age was 40.3 years. For every 100 females, the population had 92.9 males. For every 100 females ages 18 and older there were 88.8 males.

The Census Bureau's 2006–2010 American Community Survey showed that (in 2010 inflation-adjusted dollars) median household income was $80,743 (with a margin of error of +/− $4,473) and the median family income was $88,586 (+/− $5,058). Males had a median income of $66,993 (+/− $4,279) versus $49,500 (+/− $7,015) for females. The per capita income for the borough was $35,073 (+/− $2,942). About 2.7% of families and 4.5% of the population were below the poverty line, including 8.1% of those under age 18 and 3.6% of those age 65 or over.

=== 2000 census ===
As of the 2000 census, there were 14,217 people, 5,265 households, and 3,948 families residing in the township. The population density was 894.3 inhabitants per square mile (345.3/km^{2}). There were 5,411 housing units at an average density of 340.4 per square mile (131.4/km^{2}). The racial makeup of the township was 95.81% White, 2.07% African American, 0.20% Native American, 0.86% Asian, 0.28% from other races, and 0.78% from two or more races. Hispanic or Latino of any race were 1.26% of the population.

There were 5,265 households, out of which 36.9% had children under the age of 18 living with them, 62.1% were married couples living together, 9.0% had a female householder with no husband present, and 25.0% were non-families. 21.1% of all households were made up of individuals, and 7.3% had someone living alone who was 65 years of age or older. The average household size was 2.69 and the average family size was 3.14.

In the township, the population was spread out, with 26.7% under the age of 18, 6.3% from 18 to 24, 33.6% from 25 to 44, 22.3% from 45 to 64, and 11.1% who were 65 years of age or older. The median age was 36 years. For every 100 females, there were 96.0 males. For every 100 females age 18 and over, there were 92.5 males.

The median income for a household in the township was $58,256, and the median income for a family was $63,391. Males had a median income of $46,984 versus $32,495 for females. The per capita income for the township was $24,147. About 2.8% of families and 3.6% of the population were below the poverty line, including 4.3% of those under age 18 and 2.1% of those age 65 or over.

== Arts and culture ==
Musical groups from the township include pop punk band Major League.

== Parks and recreation ==
Tall Pines State Preserve is a 111-acre (45 ha) nature preserve that opened in November 2015 as Gloucester County's first state park and is located along the border of Deptford Township and Mantua Township. Originally a forest that was turned into an asparagus field and then a golf course, the land was preserved through efforts of South Jersey Land and Water Trust, the Friends of Tall Pines, Gloucester County Nature Club, and the New Jersey Green Acres Program.

The Edelman Fossil Park & Museum of Rowan University is located in the township, on a 65-acre (26 ha) former marl quarry Rowan purchased from the Inversand Company in 2015. The site preserves a 66-million-year-old fossil layer recording the mass extinction that ended the age of the dinosaurs, and research there is led by paleontologist Kenneth Lacovara. Rowan broke ground on the $73 million, 44,000-square-foot (4,100 m^{2}) museum in October 2021, funded in part by a $25 million gift from alumni Jean and Ric Edelman, and the museum opened to the public on March 29, 2025. The museum is New Jersey's largest public net-zero facility and was expected to draw about 200,000 visitors a year.

== Government ==
=== Local government ===
Mantua Township is governed under the Township form of New Jersey municipal government, one of 141 municipalities (of the 564) statewide that use this form, the second-most commonly used form of government in the state. The Township Committee is comprised of five members, who are elected directly by the voters at-large in partisan elections to serve three-year terms of office on a staggered basis, with either one or two seats coming up for election each year as part of the November general election in a three-year cycle. At an annual reorganization meeting, the Township Committee selects one of its members to serve as Mayor and another as Deputy Mayor.

As of 2025, members of the Mantua Township Committee are Mayor Robert T. Zimmerman (D, term on committee December 31, 2027; term as mayor ends 2025), John Legge (D, 2026), Eileen Lukens (D, 2025), Jason Snyder (D, 2027) and Jack Steen (D, 2025; appointed to serve an unexpired term).

In December 2024, Jack Steen was appointed to fill the seat expiring in December 2025 that had been held by Peter Scirrotto until he resigned from office the previous month; Steen will serve on an interim basis until the November 2025 general election, when voters will choose a candidate to serve the remainder of the term of office.

=== Federal, state, and county representation ===
Mantua Township is located in the 1st Congressional District and is part of New Jersey's 3rd state legislative district.

For the 119th United States Congress, New Jersey's 1st congressional district is represented by Donald Norcross (D, Camden). New Jersey is represented in the United States Senate by Democrats Cory Booker (Newark, term ends 2027) and Andy Kim (Moorestown, term ends 2031).

For the 2026–2027 session, the 3rd legislative district of the New Jersey Legislature is represented in the State Senate by John Burzichelli (D, Paulsboro) and in the General Assembly by David Bailey (D, Woodstown) and Heather Simmons (D, Glassboro).

Gloucester County is governed by a board of county commissioners, whose seven members are elected at-large to three-year terms of office on a staggered basis in partisan elections, with either two or three seats coming up for election each year. At a reorganization meeting held each January, the Board selects a Director and a Deputy Director from among its members. As of 2025, Gloucester County's Commissioners are:

Director Frank J. DiMarco (D, Deptford Township, 2025), Matt Weng (D, Pitman, 2026), Joann Gattinelli (D, Washington Township, 2026), Nicholas DeSilvio (R, Franklin Township, 2027), Denice DiCarlo (D, West Deptford Township, 2025) Deputy Director Jim Jefferson (D, Woodbury, 2026) and Christopher Konawel Jr. (R, Glassboro, 2027).

Gloucester County's constitutional officers are: Clerk James N. Hogan (D, Franklin Township; 2027), Sheriff Carmel Morina (D, Greenwich Township; 2027) and Surrogate Giuseppe "Joe" Chila (D, Woolwich Township; 2028).

=== Politics ===
United States presidential election results for Mantua Township 2024 2020 2016 2012 2008 2004
Year	Republican		Democratic		Third party(ies)	
Year	No.	%	No.	%	No.	%
2024	5,137	54.68%	4,101	43.65%	157	1.67%
2020	5,176	51.87%	4,627	46.37%	176	1.76%
2016	4,182	52.74%	3,465	43.69%	283	3.57%
2012	3,692	48.17%	3,855	50.30%	117	1.53%
2008	3,687	47.79%	3,902	50.58%	126	1.63%
2004	3,704	50.20%	3,604	48.85%	70	0.95%

As of March 2011, there were a total of 10,232 registered voters in Mantua Township, of which 3,493 (34.1%) were registered as Democrats, 2,020 (19.7%) were registered as Republicans and 4,712 (46.1%) were registered as Unaffiliated. There were 7 voters registered as Libertarians or Greens.

Gubernatorial election results for Mantua Township
Year	Republican		Democratic		Third party(ies)	
Year	No.	%	No.	%	No.	%
2025	3,871	51.48%	3,604	47.93%	45	0.60%
2021	3,495	57.61%	2,517	41.49%	55	0.91%
2017	1,909	43.91%	2,325	53.47%	114	2.62%
2013	2,985	65.98%	1,445	31.94%	94	2.08%
2009	2,422	48.91%	2,055	41.50%	475	9.59%
2005	2,006	45.44%	2,204	49.92%	205	4.64%

In the 2012 presidential election, Democrat Barack Obama received 50.3% of the vote (3,855 cast), ahead of Republican Mitt Romney with 48.2% (3,692 votes), and other candidates with 1.5% (117 votes), among the 7,731 ballots cast by the township's 10,720 registered voters (67 ballots were spoiled), for a turnout of 72.1%. In the 2008 presidential election, Democrat Barack Obama received 50.0% of the vote (3,902 cast), ahead of Republican John McCain with 47.3% (3,687 votes) and other candidates with 1.6% (126 votes), among the 7,800 ballots cast by the township's 10,429 registered voters, for a turnout of 74.8%. In the 2004 presidential election, Republican George W. Bush received 50.0% of the vote (3,704 ballots cast), outpolling Democrat John Kerry with 48.7% (3,604 votes) and other candidates with 0.7% (70 votes), among the 7,408 ballots cast by the township's 9,657 registered voters, for a turnout percentage of 76.7.

In the 2013 gubernatorial election, Republican Chris Christie received 66.0% of the vote (2,985 cast), ahead of Democrat Barbara Buono with 31.9% (1,445 votes), and other candidates with 2.1% (94 votes), among the 4,620 ballots cast by the township's 10,604 registered voters (96 ballots were spoiled), for a turnout of 43.6%. In the 2009 gubernatorial election, Republican Chris Christie received 48.1% of the vote (2,422 ballots cast), ahead of Democrat Jon Corzine with 40.8% (2,055 votes), Independent Chris Daggett with 8.6% (435 votes) and other candidates with 0.8% (40 votes), among the 5,031 ballots cast by the township's 10,357 registered voters, yielding a 48.6% turnout.

United States Senate election results for Mantua Township1
Year	Republican		Democratic		Third party(ies)	
Year	No.	%	No.	%	No.	%
2024	4,776	52.48%	4,218	46.35%	106	1.16%
2018	3,404	52.56%	2,790	43.08%	282	4.35%
2012	3,288	44.65%	3,883	52.73%	193	2.62%
2006	2,144	46.43%	2,357	51.04%	117	2.53%

United States Senate election results for Mantua Township2
Year	Republican		Democratic		Third party(ies)	
Year	No.	%	No.	%	No.	%
2020	5,049	51.53%	4,555	46.49%	194	1.98%
2014	1,839	49.49%	1,783	47.98%	94	2.53%
2013	1,272	54.43%	1,026	43.90%	39	1.67%
2008	3,534	48.19%	3,651	49.78%	149	2.03%

== Education ==
Children in pre-kindergarten through sixth grade for public school are served by the Mantua Township School District. As of the 2022–23 school year, the district, comprised of three schools, had an enrollment of 1,256 students and 135.5 classroom teachers (on an FTE basis), for a student–teacher ratio of 9.3:1. Schools in the district (with 2022–23 enrollment data from the National Center for Education Statistics) are Sewell School with 290 students in pre-kindergarten and kindergarten, Centre City School with 492 students in grades 1-3 and J. Mason Tomlin School with 473 students in grades 4-6.

Public school students in seventh through twelfth grades attend the schools of the Clearview Regional High School District, which serves students from Harrison Township and Mantua Township. Schools in the high school district (with 2022–23 enrollment data from the National Center for Education Statistics) are Clearview Regional Middle School with 753 students in grades 7-8 and Clearview Regional High School with 1,431 students in grades 9-12. Seats on the high school district's nine-member board are allocated based on population, with five seats assigned to Mantua Township.

Students from across the county are eligible to apply to attend Gloucester County Institute of Technology, a four-year high school in Deptford Township that provides technical and vocational education. As a public school, students do not pay tuition to attend the school.

Guardian Angels Regional School is a K-8 school that operates under the auspices of the Roman Catholic Diocese of Camden. Its PreK-3 campus is in Gibbstown while its 4-8 campus is in Paulsboro.

== Transportation ==
=== Roads and highways ===
As of May 2010, the township had a total of 91.85 miles (147.82 km) of roadways, of which 53.92 miles (86.78 km) were maintained by the municipality, 31.21 miles (50.23 km) by Gloucester County and 6.72 miles (10.81 km) by the New Jersey Department of Transportation.

Route 45 and Route 55 are the main highways serving Mantua Township. County Route 553 and County Route 553 Alternate also traverse the township.

=== Public transportation ===
NJ Transit bus service is available in the township between Bridgeton and Philadelphia on the 410 route and between Sewell and Philadelphia on the 412 route.

== Notable people ==
People who were born in, residents of, or otherwise closely associated with Mantua Township include:

- Thomas Carpenter (1752–1847), early American glassmaker
- Mario Cerrito (born 1984), film director, writer and producer known in the horror/thriller genre
- Lucinda Florio (1947–2022), teacher and advocate for education and literacy, who, as the wife of former New Jersey Governor James Florio, served as the First Lady of New Jersey
- George W. F. Gaunt (1865–1918), politician who served as President of the New Jersey Senate
- Paul Joseph Stankard (1943–2026), artist, lampworker and author
