= Race Street Friends Meetinghouse =

Historic church in Pennsylvania, United States

- Race Street Meetinghouse
- U.S. National Register of Historic Places
- U.S. National Historic Landmark
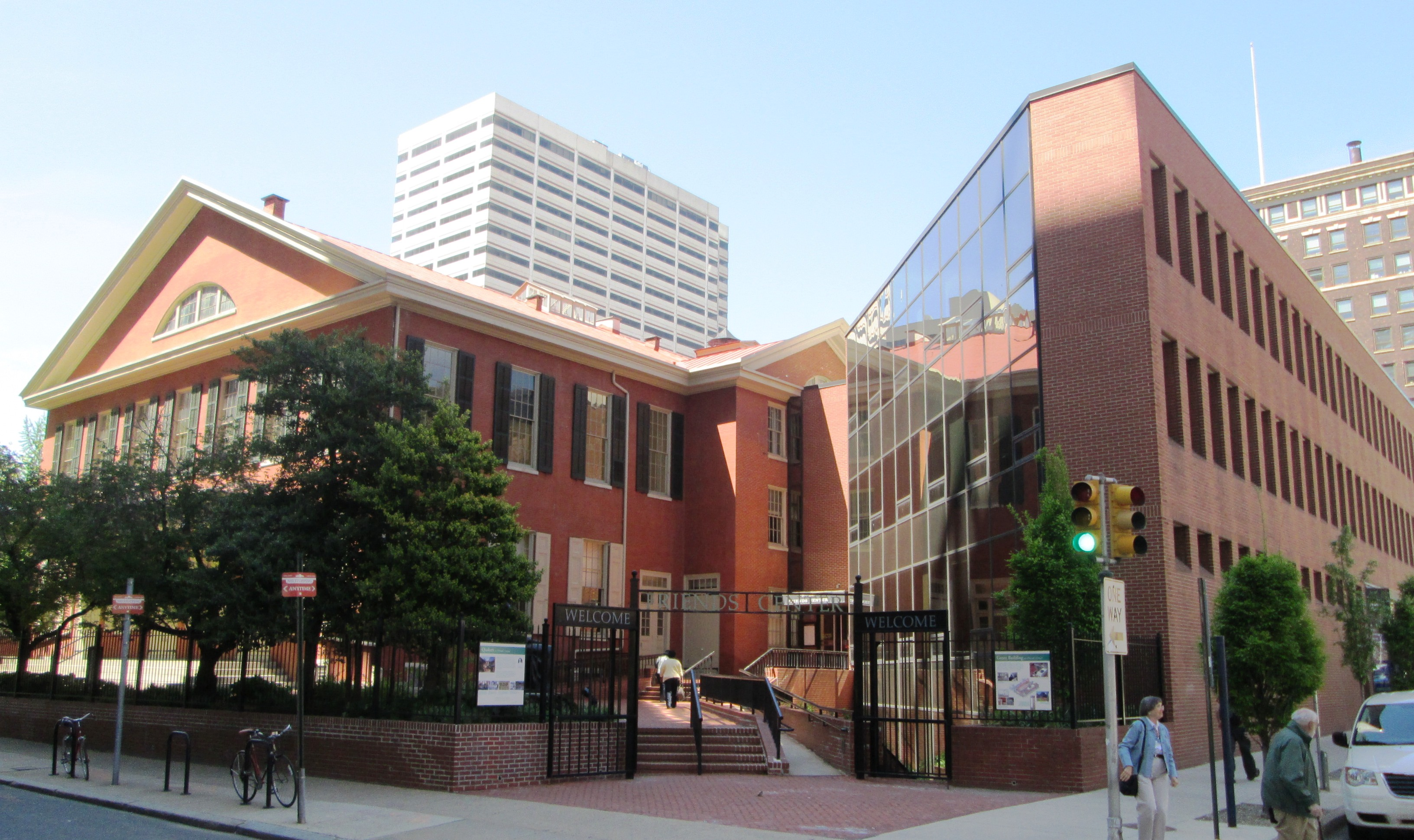
- (2013)

- Location within Philadelphia Location within Pennsylvania Location within the United States
- Location: 1515 Cherry Street; Philadelphia, Pennsylvania, U.S.
- Coordinates: 39°57′20″N 75°9′55″W
- Built: 1856
- NRHP reference No.: 93001610
- Added to NRHP: November 4, 1993

The Race Street Meetinghouse is an historic and still active Quaker meetinghouse at 1515 Cherry Street in the Center City area of Philadelphia, Pennsylvania. The meetinghouse served as the site of the Yearly Meeting of the Hicksite sect of the Religious Society of Friends, known as the Quakers, from 1857 to 1955.

Built in 1856 by the Philadelphia Yearly Meeting and what is now known as Central Philadelphia Monthly Meeting, a building 131 feet long by 80 feet wide was set fairly close to its Cherry Street frontage but sufficiently far back from Race Street to provide a pleasant open yard. The structure built was not just one meeting house, but two, so arranged and divided that either party could dispose of its property without affecting the property of the other. Construction brought two meeting rooms 36 feet high, the northern chamber being 60 feet by 80; the southern, 46 by 80. Each had "youth's galleries" on three sides. Between the two meetinghouses, and exceeding them by 16 feet in total width, was a 25-by-96-foot three-story structure containing large rooms for committee meetings and other purposes.

The Race Street Meetinghouse was at the forefront of women's involvement both in Quaker religion and in American political activism. Many leaders in the Women's Movement were associated with this meetinghouse; these included abolitionist and women's rights activist Lucretia Mott, peace activist Hannah Clothier Hull, and suffrage leader and Equal Rights Amendment author Alice Paul.

The meetinghouse was designated a National Historic Landmark in 1993 for its role in the abolition of slavery, the advancement of women's suffrage, and the civil rights movement.

The Meetinghouse is part of the Friends Center campus, which includes the National Office of the American Friends Service Committee, Friends World Committee for Consultation, Philadelphia Yearly Meeting, and the Greater Philadelphia Chapter of the United Nations Association. It is the site of a copy of Sylvia Shaw Judson's statue of Mary Dyer, the 17th-century Quaker martyr. The Friends Meeting Center, built in 1974, was designed by Cope & Lippincott.

== See also ==
- List of National Historic Landmarks in Philadelphia
- National Register of Historic Places listings in Center City, Philadelphia
- Arch Street Friends Meeting House
