= Samuel Carpenter (deputy governor) =

American merchant and public servant

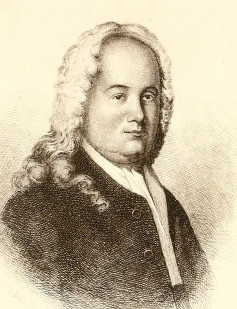

1st Treasurer of Pennsylvania
- In office 4 June 1704 – 1713

Personal details
- Born: 4 November 1649 Horsham, Sussex, England
- Died: 10 April 1714 (aged 64) Philadelphia, Pennsylvania, British America
- Resting place: Arch Street (Quakers) Burial Ground, Fourth and Arch Streets, Philadelphia, Pennsylvania. 39°57′7.2″N 75°8′50.17″W
- Spouse: Hannah Hardiman
- Parent(s): John Carpenter, of Horsham & Sarah
- Occupation: Merchant
- Known for: Deputy Governor of Philadelphia, First Treasurer of Pennsylvania
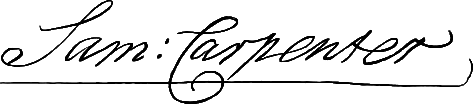
- Signature

Samuel Carpenter (4 November 1649 – 10 April 1714) was a Deputy Governor of colonial Pennsylvania. He signed the historic document "The Declaration of Fealty, Christian Belief and Test" dated 10 September 1695; the original is in the Historical Society of Pennsylvania. Carpenter was also called the "First Treasurer" of Pennsylvania, and was a partner and friend of proprietor William Penn.

== Early life ==
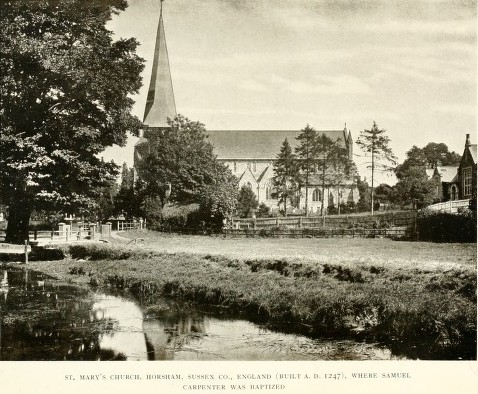
St. Mary's Parish Church in Horsham circa 1910

Born in Horsham, Sussex, England, Samuel Carpenter was baptised in the Church of St. Mary's Horsham on 20 December 1649. He was the youngest son of John Carpenter, the Sheriff of Horsham, who was murdered while attending his duties in Horsham on 9 August 1671, by his second wife Sarah (maiden name unknown). His ancestry, claimed by General Louis H. Carpenter, claims descent from a Thomas Carpenter who married Ales or Alice Fiste, a widow, at St. Mary's Parish Church in Horsham on 20 May 1565.

In 1671, when Carpenter was twenty-one years old, his father was murdered. This may have caused him to review and question who and what he was. He apparently embraced the doctrines of George Fox and the Quaker faith about this time before leaving England for Barbados about 1673. Most of his siblings remained in England as members of the Church of England. His half-brothers Abraham and Joshua came to Philadelphia where they became prosperous and influential citizens while remaining stout members of the Church of England.

Carpenter then joined himself to a colony of Quakers on the island of Barbados, where he stayed about ten or eleven years. While there, he was fined in 1673 "one thousand one hundred and ten pounds of sugar" for not appearing or not sending men in arms to render military service. It was the religious principles of the early Friends that caused them to refuse military service and pay for the "Church tax" of the National Church.

He and other members of the Society of Friends saw the introduction of African slaves as "distasteful." The slave owners of that island were instrumental in passing laws to force the Friends to cease preaching Christianity to the slaves in 1676 and causing most Friends to leave due to severe persecution by 1683. He is, however, known to have enslaved Alice of Dunk's Ferry, toll collector and oral historian.

In early 1683, Carpenter was once again fined for not sending men with arms for military service. He and a Henry Whately were fined "6,673" pounds of sugar. In consideration of leaving Barbados, the fine was suspended.

Carpenter availed himself of the opportunity with other Quakers to sail to Pennsylvania. William Penn, in great liberality, invited not only those of his own sect, but others of different beliefs to come and worship God according to their own belief and faith.

== Philadelphia and family ==
Coat of Arms of Samuel Carpenter

Carpenter came to Philadelphia about 10 July 1683. Being prosperous, by having sold his Barbados property and still having much of his inheritance from his father, he had considerable money which he invested in plantations, mines, mills, wharves and other property.

In the record of the Race Street Friends' Meeting of Philadelphia is preserved a certificate from the "Friends' Monthly Meeting at Bridgeton" in the Island of Barbados dated "23rd, 6 mo., 1683" (not June but about August on the current calendar) attesting to the good standing of Carpenter. In the same record book is recorded a certificate that was received and accepted from the "Haverford West Meeting" in Wales dated "2nd of 6 mo., 1683" concerning Hannah Hardiman. Carpenter married Hannah Hardiman (Haverfordwest, Pembrokeshire, Wales, 1645 – 24 May 1728, Philadelphia) on 12 December 1684 in Philadelphia. She was well known for her intellectual ability and influence in the Society of Friends. Their marriage certificate is in the possession of the Historical Society of Pennsylvania and is the earliest in existence of that city. They had six known children.

- Hannah Carpenter (c. 3 March 1685/1686 – 25 July 1728, Philadelphia) married William Fishbourne (Maryland, 25 June 1677 – 27 May 1742, Philadelphia) on 8 January 1701 in Philadelphia. He was a member of the Society of Friends, and a merchant and the Mayor of Philadelphia 1719–1720.
- Samuel Carpenter (2nd) (Philadelphia, 9 February 1687/1688 – will dated 11 November 1748, died soon after in Philadelphia) married Hannah Preston (Philadelphia, 1693 – 6 March 1772, Philadelphia). He was a merchant, Justice of the Peace (1715–1725) for Philadelphia county and a member of the Philadelphia Assembly (1720–1722).
- Joshua Carpenter (28 March 1689 – 16 April 1689) died as an infant in Philadelphia.
- John Carpenter (Philadelphia, 5 May 1690 – 1724, Philadelphia) married Ann Hoskins (c. 1690 – 20 March 1718, Philadelphia) on 11 November 1710. He was a member of the Philadelphia Common Council from 7 October 1718 until his death in 1724. His name appears for the last time in those minutes on "9th mo., 13, 1723."
- Rebecca Carpenter (Philadelphia, 26 April 1692 – 1713, Philadelphia) never married.
- Abraham Carpenter (Philadelphia, c. 1694–1702, Philadelphia) died as a young boy.

Most members of this family are buried at the Society of Friends (Quakers) Burial Ground at Fourth and Arch Streets in Philadelphia.

=== Notable half-brothers ===
Two of Carpenter's half-brothers arrived, it is believed but not proven, on different ships in Philadelphia in 1683. One may have accompanied or followed Samuel from Barbados. The dates they arrived and from the ports from which they sailed have not been found. Joshua, Samuel and Abraham were each born of a different mother, but they remained close throughout their lives.

Joshua Carpenter (baptised in Horsham, 26 August 1638 – 1722, Delaware) was the son of Mary Somervale, the first wife of Sheriff John Carpenter. Joshua married an Elizabeth Story and later moved to the state of Delaware. He had at least two children and two grandchildren by the time he died.

He was one of the founders of Christ Church in Philadelphia. He was a brewer whose Philadelphia Ale was well known. Despite ending his days in Delaware, he was buried in the center of Washington Square under an apple tree. In an enclosed ground measuring forty feet square lies the interred members of Joshua's family and that of the related Story family. The story of this small "Potter's Field" burial was caused by the death in the latter family by suicide, which excluded her from burial in the common church grounds of the city.

Abraham Carpenter (baptised in Horsham, 18 November 1652 – 10 April 1708, Philadelphia) from Elizabeth (maiden name unknown), the third wife of Sheriff John Carpenter of Horsham. Abraham was a merchant and married later in life, yet remained steadfast to the Church of England. Despite this he was buried in the Friends Burial Ground in Philadelphia. His wife's name is unknown other than she died about the "3rd Mo. 1705" and was a Quaker. He made several trips back to England and kept in contact with the family there. He helped build Christ Church in Philadelphia. His efforts in creating and restoring trade with the mills in England insured financial success for Philadelphia. He became sick after returning from a difficult journey in the winter of 1707-1708 and died before seeing the financial recovery he helped prepare for in Philadelphia.

== Carpenter's Wharf ==
Carpenter bought a lot in Philadelphia extending from King (later called Water) Street to Front Street and on to Second Street. This lot extended to Ton or Tun Alley which was once between Chestnut and Walnut Streets east of Front Street. On the east side of this lot on the Delaware front, he built the wharf or "a fair key" (dock) as mentioned by William Penn. This, the first wharf built in Philadelphia, became known as "Carpenter's Wharf" and could handle ships of 500 tons or more. It was expanded and modernised over the years with numerous storehouses built adjacent to support the wharf, as well as other commercial structures, some of which stood for over a century. Today, this spot is covered by Interstate 95 where it passes along Penn's Landing.

Not far from Carpenter's Wharf on King (Water) Street, built one of the first brick mansions for himself and his family. The house, which faced the Delaware River, was taken down by 1830.

On "No. 16" Second Street, Carpenter subsequently built the historic "Slate Roof House," the first of its kind and which was occupied by many notables in Philadelphia's history. This mansion stood from 1687 until 1867 when it was demolished.

In 1686, Carpenter and his brother Joshua established the Tun Tavern brewhouse at Carpenter's Wharf, traditionally regarded as the site where the United States Marine Corps held its first recruitment drive.

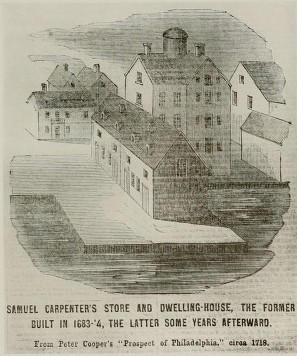
Samuel Carpenter's Store, House & Wharf, c. 1718.

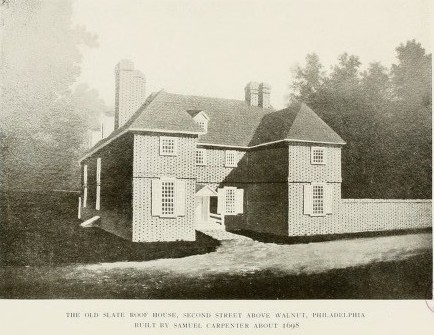
The old Slate Roof House built by Samuel Carpenter

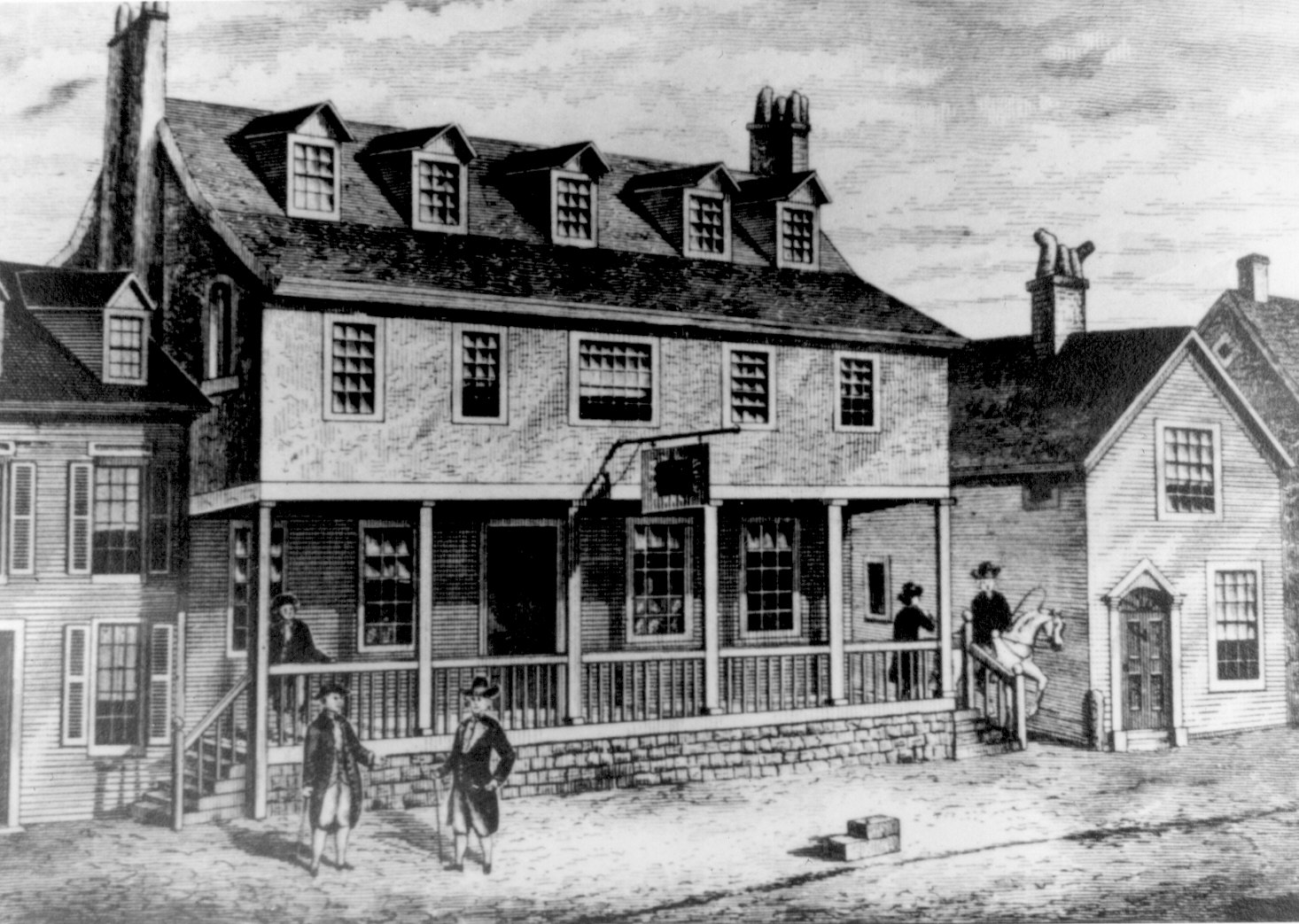
Sketch of the original Tun Tavern

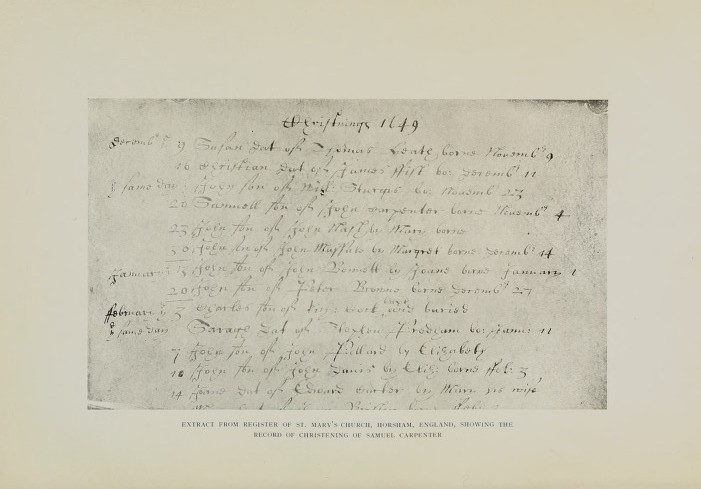
Photo of part of St. Mary's Parish Register in 1649 showing Samuel Carpenter's Christening date

== Duties to the colony and city of Philadelphia ==
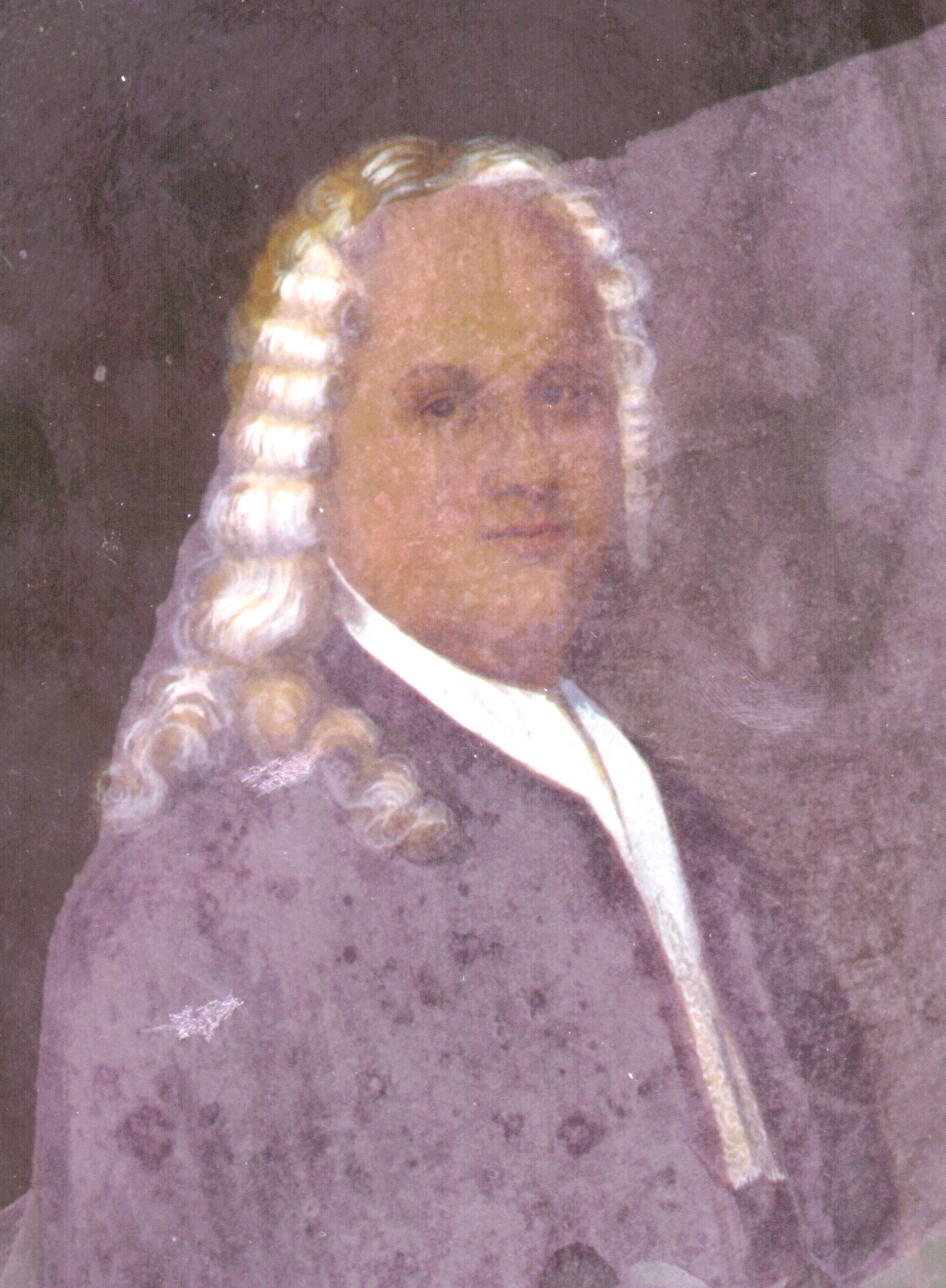
Painting of Samuel Carpenter

- Member of the Governor's Provincial Council, 9 September 1686, 1687–1689, 1695–1697, ?-1713.
- Provincial Treasurer (First Treasurer), 4 June 1704 – 1710, 1711–1713.
- Member of the Assembly, 1693–1694, 1696.
- Member of the Assembly (Bucks county) 1705.

=== Deputy Governor of Pennsylvania 1694-1698 ===
Carpenter was the Deputy for the Governor William Penn who was known as "The Proprietor". Carpenter served from 24 November 1694 to 3 September 1698. Governor Penn was often unable to govern his possessions acquired under Royal Charter directly. The day-to-day operations devolved to his deputy governors. "It is generally conceded that, next to Penn himself, Samuel Carpenter was at this time the most wealthy and influential citizen in the colony. He was a man of great force in every sense of the word, and being a Quaker of the most pronounced views, he, of course, proved to be of the greatest value and assistance to Penn during the latter's enforced absence in England."

== Financial setback ==
Due to the privations of pirates and war, the financial situation in Philadelphia became difficult starting in 1702. Heavy losses in trade caused Carpenter and others to be affected by a loss of capital. In various letters, he seems embarrassed and was obliged to sell much of his properties.

In 1704, James Logan, speaking of their joint losses, says, "thy success at sea is so very discouraging, that I should never be willing to be concerned more this way : --- and William Trent, who has hitherto been a partner in most of thy losses, almost protests against touching with any vessel again where a proprietary holds a part!"

Carpenter, in a letter of 1708, to Jonathan Dickinson, thus speaks of their embarrassments of trade, saying, "I am glad thou didst not come this summer, for craft from Martinico and several vessels here have been detained some time in fear of the enemy, and now by this conveyance to Jamaica, they are hurrying off 16 vessels to join convoy at the capes under the York man of war". By 1709, trade was up and profits were up. By the time of his death in 1714, Carpenter had paid off almost all of his debts allowing his family to be well established in property.

== Patron and partner of Philadelphia ==
Carpenter was not only involved in the process of building up Philadelphia, but was an early philanthropist who supported public causes in the city. Many early records testify to his key role in its founding and development of Philadelphia.

Chapter 7 of the Annals of Philadelphia and Pennsylvania by John F. Watson describes "The Landing at Penn at Chester." In the late 1840s, from the bottom of Chester Creek was found "an iron vane of that mill, curiously wrought into letters and dates." The following picture is direct from page 25 of the Carpenter book of 1912. The "He" described is William Penn.

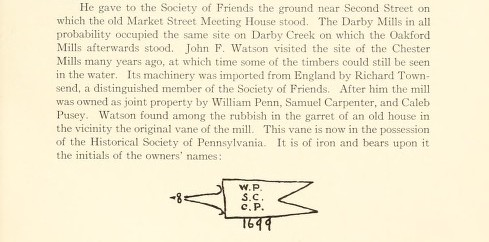
The story of the Weather Vane from the Samuel Carpenter 1912 book by General Louis H. Carpenter

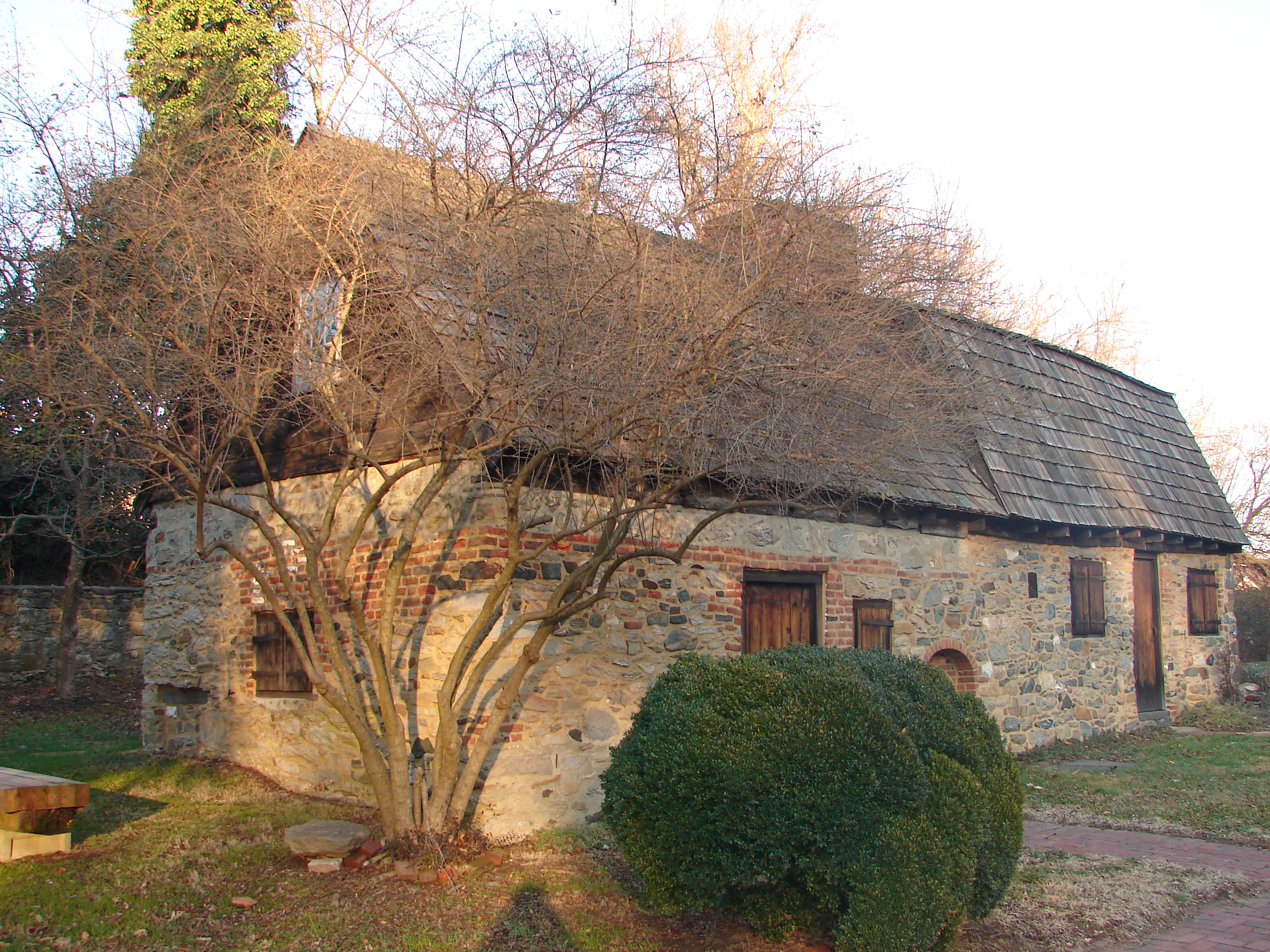
The Caleb Pusey house was started about 1682 and completed in 1696.

The initials express the original partners, to wit: William Penn, Carpenter, and Caleb Pusey when the mill was rebuilt. This "Weather Vane" was kept for some years before it was donated to the Philadelphia Historical Society. At one point it was "gilded" and spent years on a roof in Harrisburg. Then it was given to the Atwater Kent Museum of Philadelphia. This historical artefact is occasionally on display. Efforts over the years to return or loan this item to "Caleb Pusey House and Landingford Plantation" (probably the oldest structure in Pennsylvania) which is adjacent to the old mill site is pending.

== Death and honours ==
Carpenter died at the house of his son-in-law, William Fishbourn, at Sepviva plantation (380 acres are now part of Fairhill), Philadelphia, on 10 April 1714.

His friend James Logan wrote in a letter dated "2 mo. 11th, 1714" (now known as 11 April 1714) to William Penn: "We have now lost our dear friend, Carpenter. He departed last night about 11, at his daughter Fishbourn's where he lodged when taken ill. He lay about twelve days ill of a violent rheumatism and fever, in great pain, but just before his departure he took leave of all his friends about him and went quietly away." "And further, of his honour, integrity and the high estimation in which he was held ... sincere honesty and public spirit ..." "He was universally beloved and esteemed here as I always loved him and his generous disposition."

The Friends meeting, after his death, said of him: "He was a pattern of humility, patience and self denial; a man fearing God and hating covetousness, much given to hospitality and good work. He was a loving affectionate husband, tender father and a faithful friend and brother."

Carpenter was laid to rest at the Society of Friends (Quakers) Burial Ground at Fourth and Arch Streets in Philadelphia the day after James Logan's letter dated "2 mo. 11th, 1714".

Carpenter, the immigrant, left numerous posterity, many of whom became distinguished in the affairs of Philadelphia, Pennsylvania and Providence, Rhode Island. Many leading families of Philadelphia (DuPont, Lloyd, Preston, Story, Wharton, Wright and others) can trace their ancestry back to Carpenter.

== See also ==
- Horsham Township, Montgomery County, Pennsylvania, was named in honour of the birthplace of Carpenter "purchased 5,000 acres (20 km2), 4,200 acres (17 km2) within the present boundaries of the township. In 1709, Carpenter, then Treasurer of Pennsylvania, began to sell tracts of land to migrating Quakers. In 1717, Horsham Township was established as a municipal entity by a vote of the people."
