= WrestleMania 36 =

2020 WWE pay-per-view and livestreaming event

- Promotional poster featuring John Cena, Charlotte Flair, Roman Reigns, Becky Lynch, and "The Fiend" Bray Wyatt
- Promotion: WWE
- Brand(s): Raw; SmackDown; NXT
- Date: March 25–26, 2020 (aired April 4–5, 2020 (Note: This event was originally set to air live as a one-night event on April 5, 2020, before changing to a two-night event that aired on tape delay.))
- City: Orlando, Florida
- Venue: WWE Performance Center (Note: Two matches were taped elsewhere; the Boneyard match was taped on location in the Orlando area, while the Firefly Fun House match was taped at Titan Towers in Stamford, Connecticut. The COVID-19 pandemic caused WWE to mandate no paying audience for the event at any of the locations. This event was originally set to be held at Raymond James Stadium in Tampa, Florida.)
- Attendance: 0 (behind closed doors) (Note: The event was held without a live audience due to the COVID-19 pandemic in the United States.)
- Tagline: Too Big for Just One Night!

WWE event chronology
← Previous; Elimination Chamber	Next → Money in the Bank

WrestleMania chronology
← Previous; 35	Next → 37

WrestleMania 36 was a 2020 two-part professional wrestling pay-per-view (PPV) and streaming event produced by WWE, held for wrestlers from the promotion's Raw, SmackDown, and NXT brand divisions. It was the 36th annual WrestleMania and was the first major professional wrestling event to be affected by the COVID-19 pandemic that began in mid-March. As a result of the pandemic, the event was filmed on March 25 and 26, 2020, at the WWE Performance Center in Orlando, Florida with no audience and was the first WrestleMania broadcast as a two-night event, airing on Saturday, April 4, and Sunday, April 5, 2020. National Football League (NFL) player Rob Gronkowski served as the host of the event.

The event was originally scheduled to take place solely on April 5, 2020, at Raymond James Stadium in Tampa, Florida and was to air live. In mid-March, all WWE programming for Raw and SmackDown was relocated to the Performance Center training facility with no audience and only essential staff present due to the pandemic, which made WrestleMania 36 the only edition of WrestleMania to be held without a live crowd and to air on tape delay. Taking advantage of the format, two cinematic matches—a "Boneyard match" and a "Firefly Fun House match"—were filmed offsite in an atypical, cinematic style. In June, Florida lifted restrictions on paid spectator attendance at sporting events, but to a limited venue capacity, with the next year's WrestleMania 37 moved to Raymond James Stadium, which adopted much of the buccaneer-themed marketing originally used for WrestleMania 36, including a similar logo. After WrestleMania 37 was held with a limited venue capacity, WWE resumed live touring with full capacity crowds that July.

The change to a two-night broadcast became permanent, with the format also expanding to SummerSlam beginning with its 2025 installment. On pay-per-view, the two productions were sold as individual shows, with both available as a package deal. This would also be the final WrestleMania to livestream on the American version of the WWE Network, which merged under Peacock in April 2021. This was also the first and only WrestleMania to promote the NXT brand, after it became recognized as one of WWE's three main brands in October 2019. Following WrestleMania 36, however, the NXT roster was largely kept separate from Raw and SmackDown's due to concerns over the pandemic with NXT's events held at Full Sail University in Winter Park, Florida. NXT then moved to the Performance Center in October, as Raw and SmackDown had moved to a bio-secure bubble called the WWE ThunderDome, before NXT reverted to being the company's developmental brand in September 2021.

The card comprised 18 matches which were divided between the two nights, including one match on each night's Kickoff pre-show and a dark match on the second night. In the main event for Part 1, The Undertaker, partly returning to his "American Bad Ass" character for the first time in over 16 years, defeated AJ Styles in a Boneyard match, which was ultimately Undertaker's final match. In the penultimate match, Braun Strowman defeated Goldberg to win SmackDown's Universal Championship. Strowman was a replacement for Roman Reigns, who pulled out of the event amid concerns surrounding the pandemic, and this would also be Goldberg's last WrestleMania match before his retirement in 2025. In other prominent matches, Becky Lynch defeated Shayna Baszler to retain the Raw Women's Championship, John Morrison defeated Kofi Kingston and Jimmy Uso in a triple threat ladder match to retain the SmackDown Tag Team Championship for himself and his absent partner, The Miz, and Kevin Owens defeated Seth Rollins in a No Disqualification match. In the main event for Part 2, Drew McIntyre defeated Brock Lesnar to win Raw's WWE Championship, after which an impromptu dark match occurred in which McIntyre retained the title against Big Show, which was shown on the April 6 episode of Raw. In the penultimate match, "The Fiend" Bray Wyatt defeated John Cena in a Firefly Fun House match. In other prominent matches, Edge defeated Randy Orton in a Last Man Standing match, which was Edge's first singles match since April 2011, and in the opening bout, Charlotte Flair defeated Rhea Ripley to win the NXT Women's Championship for a second time, which was the first and only time that an NXT championship was defended at a WrestleMania.

The event was generally well-received by critics and fans, largely praised for its creativity in adapting to the pandemic. The Boneyard and Firefly Fun House matches were met with high praise for their uniqueness and cinematic approach, while the SmackDown Tag Team Championship match, Owens vs. Rollins, and the NXT Women's Championship match also received favorable reviews. Criticism was directed mainly towards both the WWE Championship and Universal Championship matches for being too short and repetitive, and Edge vs. Orton for being too long.

== Production ==
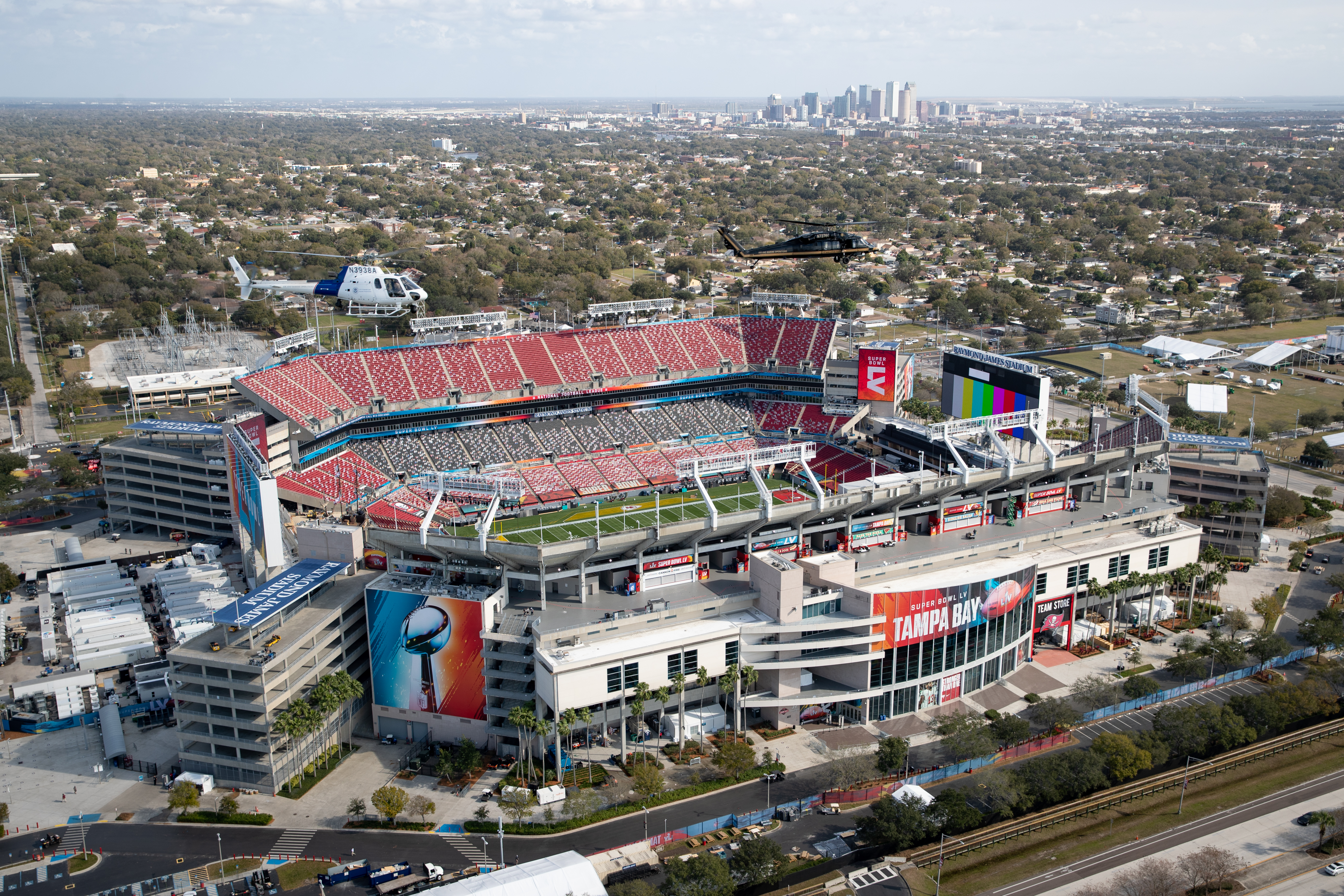
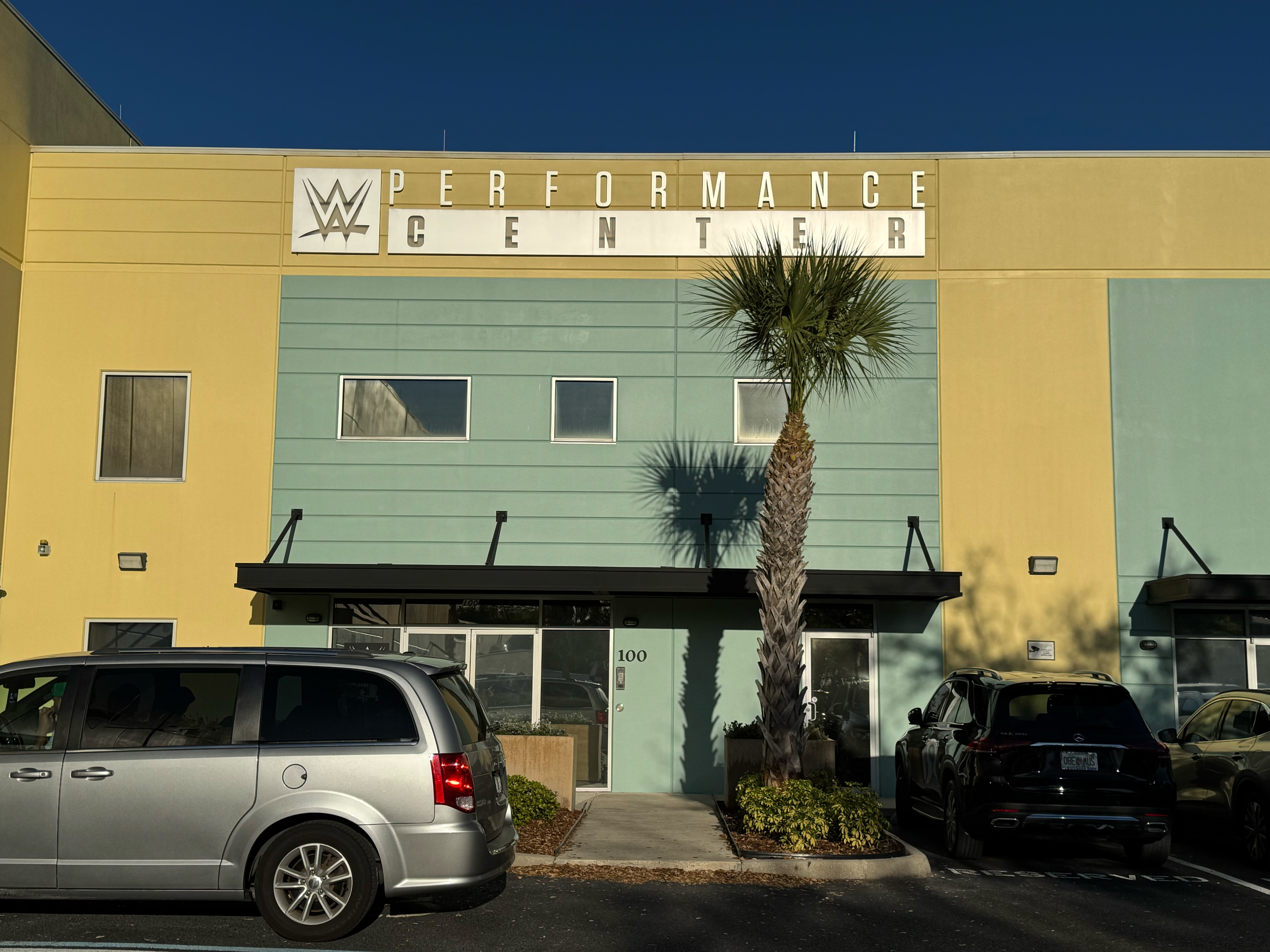
The 36th annual WrestleMania was originally scheduled to be held at Raymond James Stadium in Tampa, Florida, but due to the COVID-19 pandemic, it was relocated to the WWE Performance Center in Orlando with no spectators in attendance. The following year's WrestleMania 37 would instead be held at Raymond James Stadium but to a limited venue capacity.

=== Background ===
WrestleMania is WWE's flagship professional wrestling pay-per-view (PPV) and livestreaming event, having first been held in 1985. It was the company's first pay-per-view produced and was also WWE's first major event available via livestreaming when the company launched the WWE Network in February 2014. It is the longest-running professional wrestling event in history and is held annually between mid-March to mid-April. It was the first of WWE's original four PPVs, which includes Royal Rumble, SummerSlam, and Survivor Series, referred to as the "Big Four". WrestleMania was ranked the sixth most valuable sports brand in the world by Forbes in 2017, and has been described as the Super Bowl of sports entertainment. Much like the Super Bowl, cities bid for the right to host the year's edition of WrestleMania.

WrestleMania 36 was the fourth WrestleMania to be held in the U.S. state of Florida, after WrestleMania XXIV in 2008, WrestleMania XXVIII in 2012, and WrestleMania 33 in 2017. The event featured wrestlers from the Raw and SmackDown brand divisions, as well as NXT—although some NXT wrestlers had appeared in WrestleMania's previously annual battles royal, this was the first WrestleMania to promote the brand, following NXT becoming one of WWE's three major brands in September 2019. National Football League (NFL) player Rob Gronkowski, who had recently signed with WWE, was announced as the host of WrestleMania 36. Gronkowski last appeared for WWE during the WrestleMania 33 Kickoff pre-show. "Blinding Lights" by The Weeknd was the official theme song for the event.

==== Impact of the COVID-19 pandemic ====
Announced on March 7, 2019, the event was originally scheduled to take place at Raymond James Stadium in Tampa, Florida on April 5, 2020, and was to air live. As a result of the COVID-19 pandemic, other wrestling promotions began to cancel or postpone their shows in an attempt to prevent further spreading of the COVID-19 virus. This became true after the National Basketball Association (NBA) suspended its season after two of its players tested positive for COVID-19 which caused a massive ripple effect, effectively shutting down the vast majority of the sports world within five days. In speaking with the Tampa Bay Times regarding how this outbreak could affect WrestleMania 36, WWE's Chief Brand Officer Stephanie McMahon said "The health and safety of not only our fan base, but also our superstars, really does come first ... We don't want to put anyone in a bad situation ever, regardless of the circumstance. Those are not risks worth taking". WWE's Executive Vice President of Special Events John Saboor further noted that they were constantly monitoring global events. A meeting was held by Tampa officials on March 12 to determine the fate of WrestleMania 36; it was decided that the event would still proceed as planned, barring that the situation did not worsen in a week's time. Hillsborough County Commissioner Les Miller further stated that if the situation was not any better by the following week, they would "pull the plug" on WrestleMania 36 if WWE did not do it themselves. WWE then stated that there was a contingency plan ready in case the event was canceled.

On March 16, WWE announced that the event would be held at the WWE Performance Center in Orlando, Florida with only essential personnel in attendance, as with all other WWE weekly programs during the pandemic. WWE then announced that WrestleMania 36 would be split into a two-night event, on April 4 and 5. The re-location effectively made it the third WrestleMania to be held in the city of Orlando, behind XXIV and 33. Many viewers also saw this expansion to two nights as WWE taking an idea from New Japan Pro-Wrestling (NJPW), which held its Wrestle Kingdom 14 event on January 4 and 5 earlier in the year. Marketing of the event subsequently emphasized the change in format, with the new tagline "Too Big for Just One Night". WWE also produced a commemorative shirt reading "I Wasn't There", a spoof of their "I Was There" shirts of previous WrestleManias.

It was then reported by PWInsider that WWE were pre-recording several episodes of their weekly programs (with the exception of the live broadcast of the March 23 episode of Monday Night Raw) for future broadcasts, as well as WrestleMania itself, between March 21–26, marking the first WrestleMania to be pre-recorded rather than live. WrestleMania's tapings at the Performance Center were held between March 25 and 26. It was reported that WWE had filmed post-WrestleMania episodes of Raw and NXT after production wrapped on WrestleMania, before taking a two-week break.

In an interview with TV Guide, WWE's Executive Vice President of Global Talent Strategy & Development and part-time wrestler Paul "Triple H" Levesque explained that the "unique" pre-recorded nature of the event gave them the opportunity to experiment with new production elements and settings (as opposed to being confined to the ring), such as the "Boneyard" and "Firefly Fun House" matches, which were done as cinematic matches. The Boneyard match was filmed at a custom-built set on location in the Orlando area (about a 40-minute drive away from the Performance Center), while the Firefly Fun House match segments were all taped at WWE's then-headquarters, Titan Towers in Stamford, Connecticut, using props and set pieces from their storage facility. In lieu of a live performance of "America the Beautiful" to open the show as per tradition, a montage of performances of the song from past editions of WrestleMania was shown instead.

==== Changes in participation ====
The card underwent changes due to injuries and issues that arose related to the ongoing pandemic. Triple H confirmed that due to the circumstances, nothing would be held against any of the wrestlers who missed the event. He also stated that all of the talent competing were there in a voluntary capacity. However, this had already been planned before the changes in format and location brought about from the pandemic.

WrestleMania's annual battles royal, the André the Giant Memorial Battle Royal and WrestleMania Women's Battle Royal, were not scheduled to occur at WrestleMania 36 to limit the number of wrestlers in the ring at the same time. Roman Reigns, who was at an increased risk for COVID-19 due to being in an immunocompromised state from his previous struggles with leukemia, requested to be removed from his match against Goldberg and WWE honored the request; Braun Strowman, who was last seen at Elimination Chamber on March 8, and was not originally planned to be on the WrestleMania 36 card, was selected as Reigns's replacement in the match. Andrade, who was scheduled to team with Angel Garza to face The Street Profits (Angelo Dawkins and Montez Ford) for the Raw Tag Team Championship, was removed from that match due to an injury and was replaced by NXT's Austin Theory. Additionally, it was reported that The Miz had contracted an illness and was pulled from the WrestleMania card; this turned the planned triple threat tag team ladder match for the SmackDown Tag Team Championship into a triple threat ladder match for the title, contested between one member from each team that was originally scheduled for the match: Jimmy Uso for The Usos, Kofi Kingston for The New Day, and defending champion John Morrison for himself and The Miz. Dana Brooke was originally advertised to be a part of the SmackDown Women's Championship elimination match, but she was taken off the card after reportedly being put into precautionary quarantine; Rey Mysterio was also reported to be in precautionary quarantine, but he had not been advertised for a match, though was reportedly going to face Andrade for the United States Championship.

=== Broadcast outlets ===
Parts 1 and 2 of WrestleMania 36 were sold as individual pay-per-views, with both available as a package deal. Both nights were also streamed on the WWE Network worldwide. For the first time, WWE announced that it would also offer the event as a digital purchase in the United States via FITE TV and the Fox Sports app (as an extension of Fox's broadcasts of SmackDown). ESPN, which at the time did not normally air WWE programming, aired encores of previous editions of WrestleMania during the lead-up to the event to replace the National Collegiate Athletic Association's (NCAA) women's basketball tournament that had been scrapped.

=== Storylines ===
The event comprised a total of 19 matches divided across the two nights, including one match on each night's Kickoff pre-show and one dark match on the second night. Results were predetermined by WWE's writers on the Raw, SmackDown, and NXT brands, while storylines were produced on WWE's weekly television shows, Monday Night Raw, Friday Night SmackDown, and NXT.

==== Main event matches ====
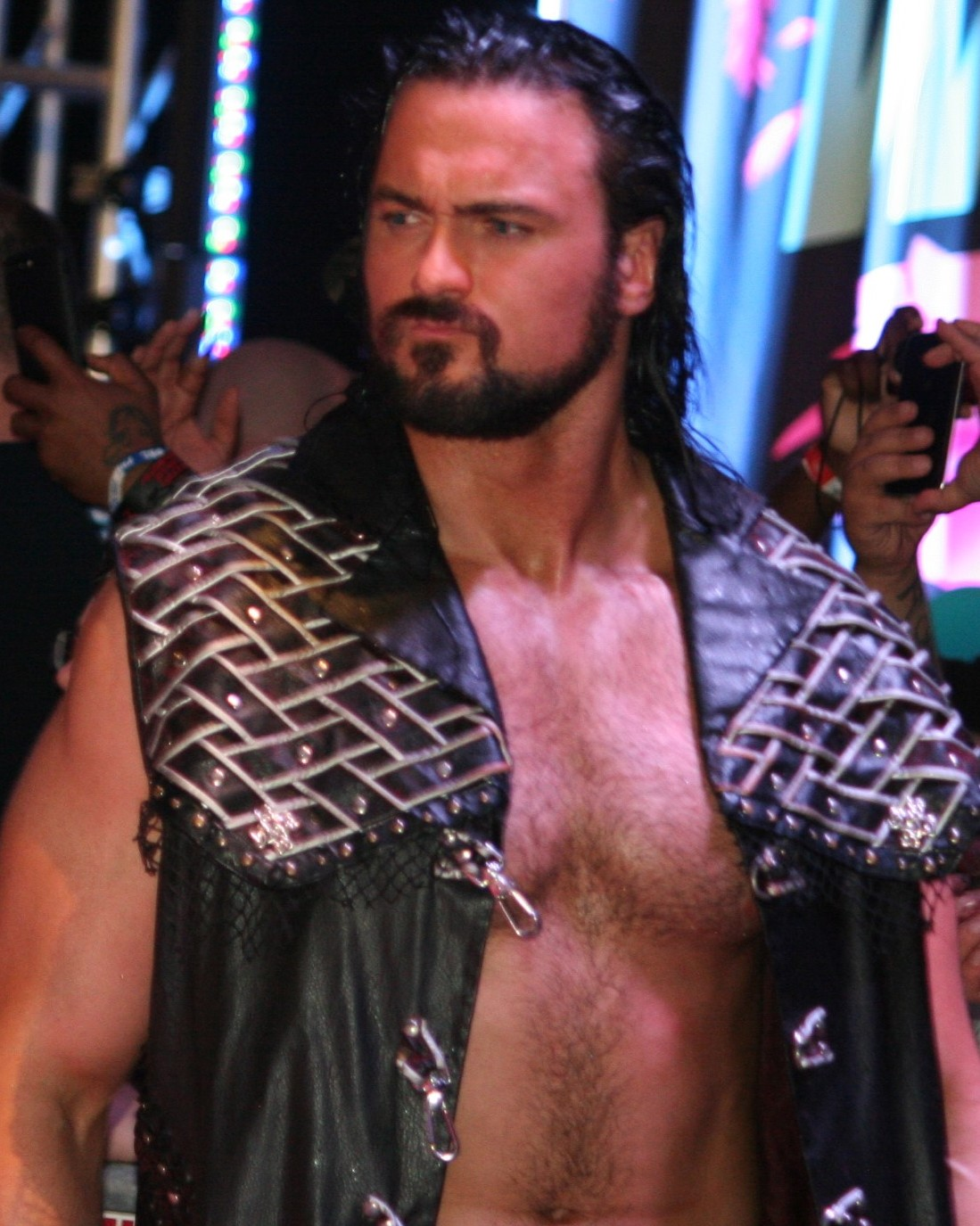
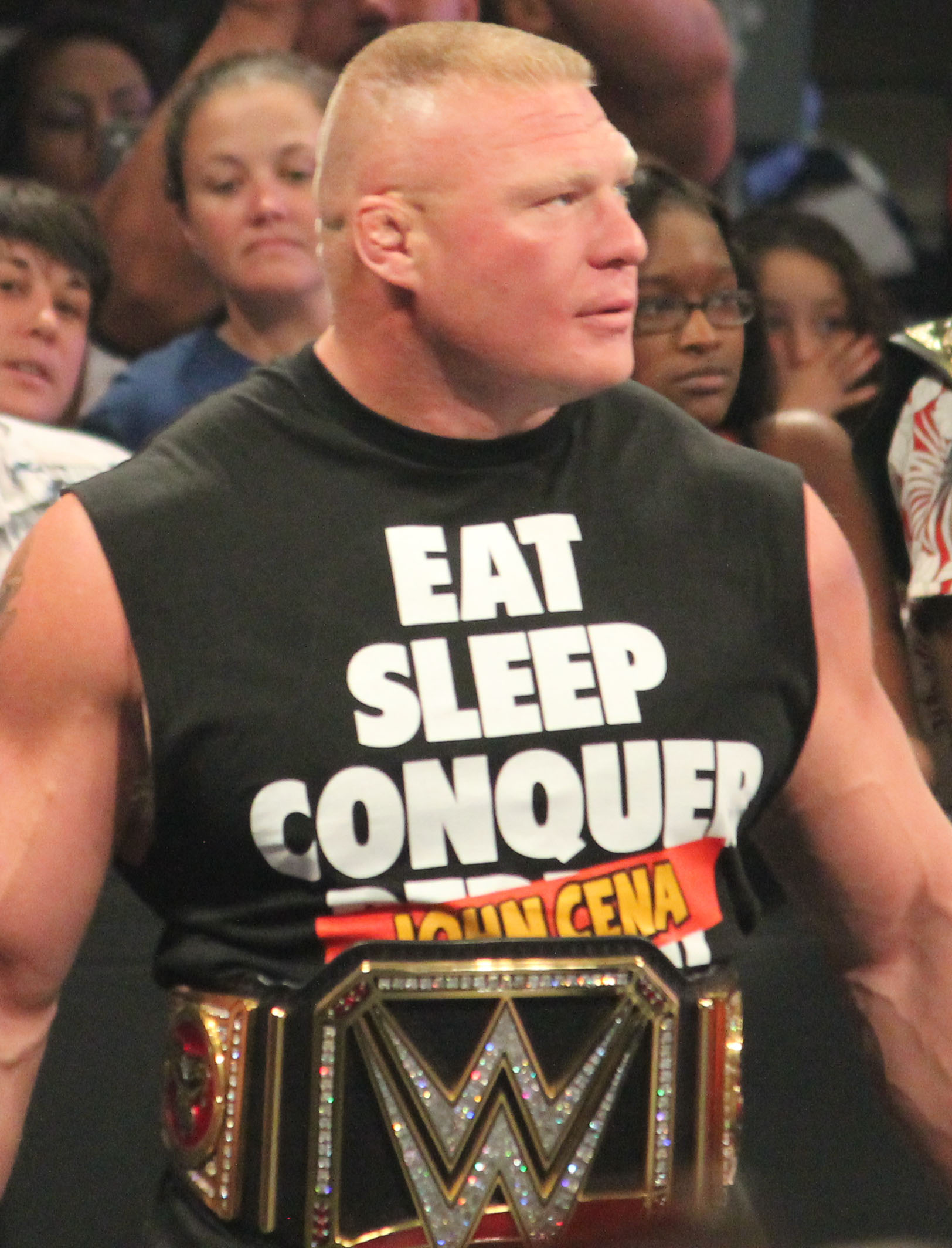
2020 Men's Royal Rumble winner Drew McIntyre challenged Brock Lesnar for Raw's WWE Championship in the main event of Part 2.

Feeling as though nobody deserved an opportunity to challenge him at the Royal Rumble or WrestleMania, Raw's WWE Champion Brock Lesnar decided to enter himself into the men's Royal Rumble match as entrant number one. Lesnar dominated the first half of the match until he was eventually eliminated by Raw's Drew McIntyre, who would go on and win the match, thus earning himself a world championship match of his choosing at WrestleMania. The next night on Raw, McIntyre announced that he would challenge Lesnar for the WWE Championship at the event. At Super ShowDown, Lesnar retained the title against Ricochet, keeping him as the defending champion against McIntyre at WrestleMania.

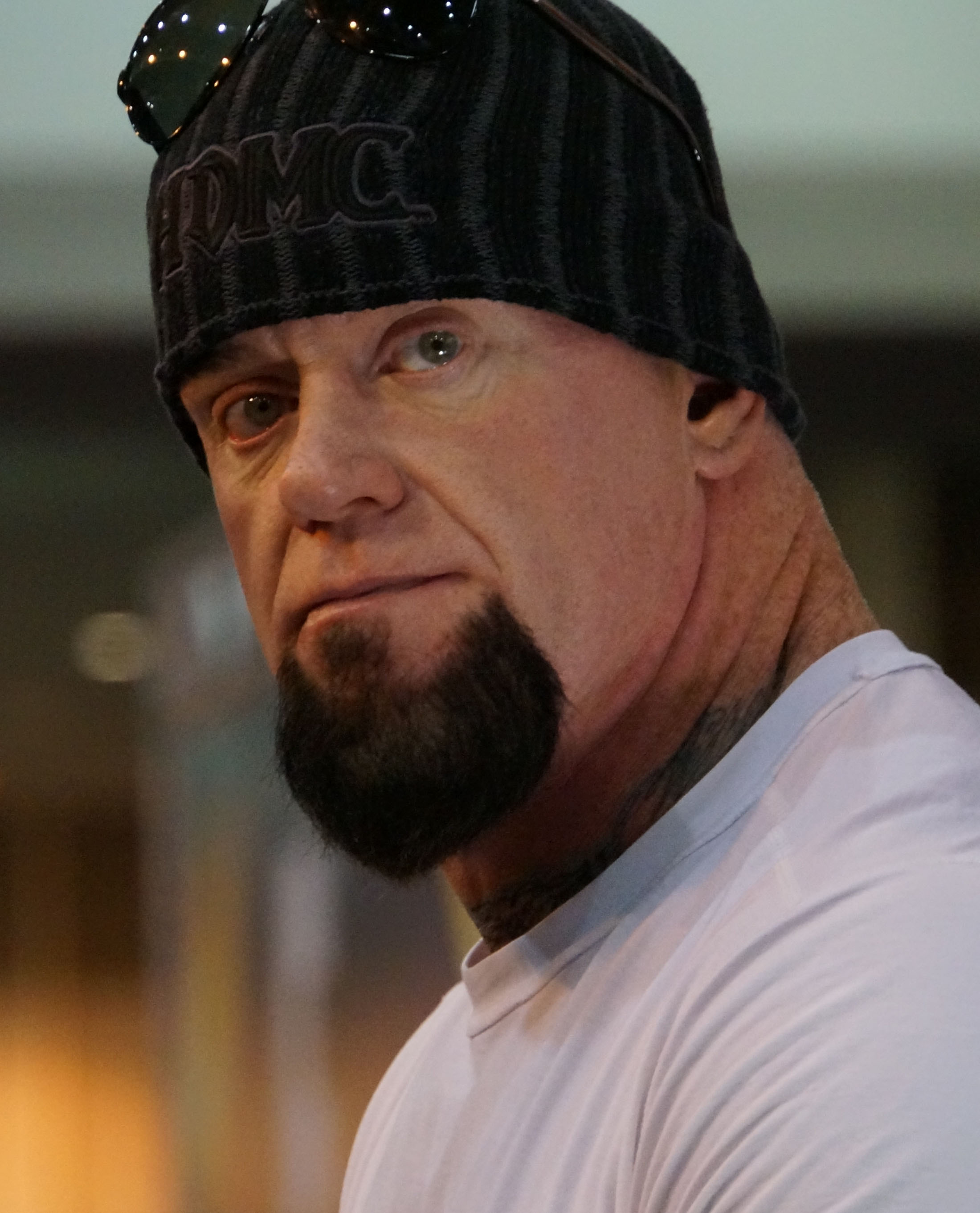
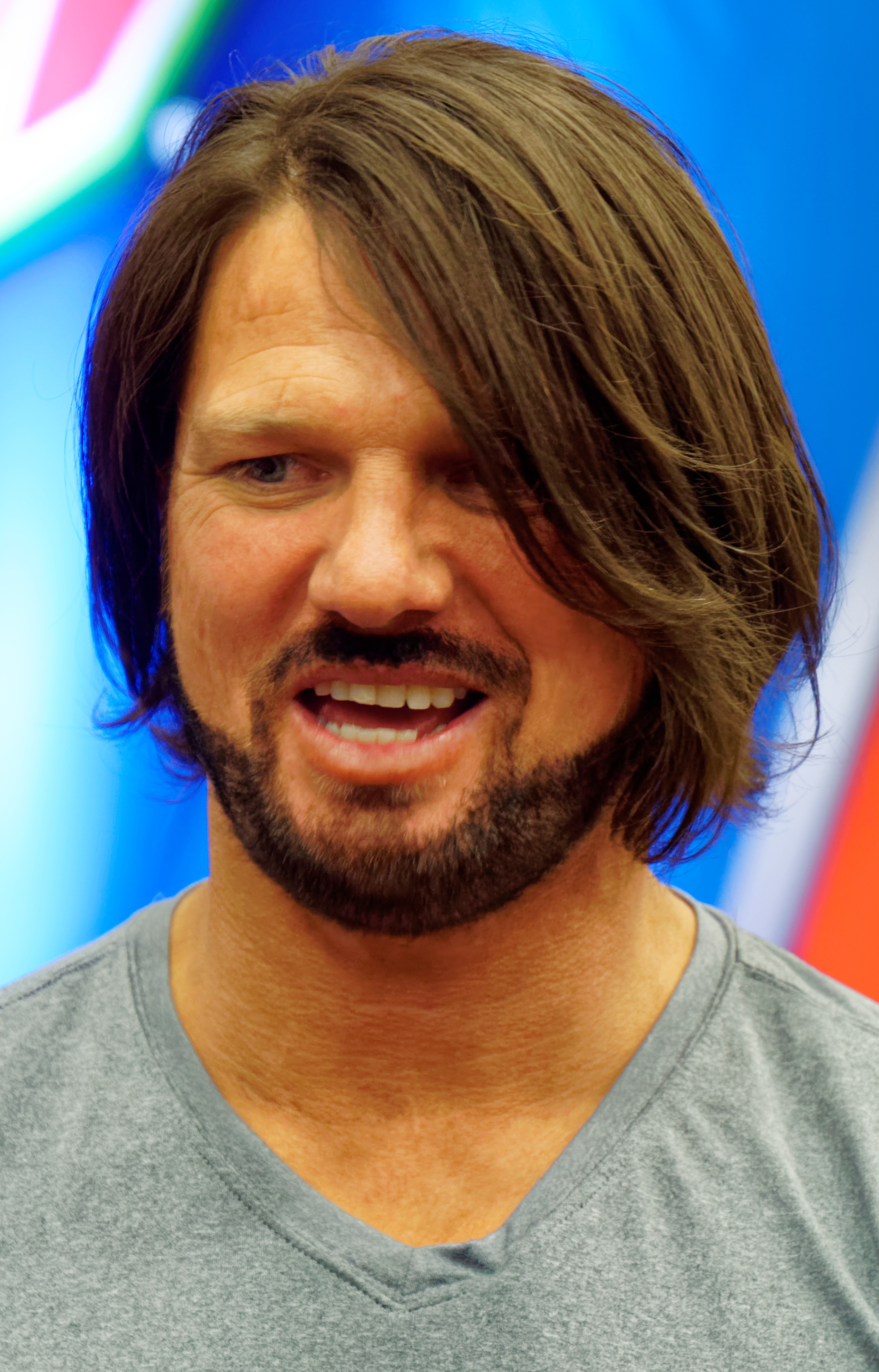
The Undertaker faced AJ Styles in a cinematic Boneyard match—the main event of Part 1—in what was later revealed to be the final match of The Undertaker's career.

At Super ShowDown, AJ Styles was a participant in the Tuwaiq Mountain Trophy gauntlet match. Final participant Rey Mysterio was ambushed backstage by Styles's O.C. stablemates Luke Gallows and Karl Anderson, prompting Styles to declare himself the winner by forfeit. The referee gave Mysterio until the count of 10, during which, the camera cut backstage, showing that Gallows and Anderson had been attacked by The Undertaker, making a surprise return. Undertaker then made his entrance, taking Mysterio's place, and performed a Chokeslam on Styles to win the match and the trophy. On the following Raw, a disgruntled Styles mocked Undertaker for still wrestling and issued a warning. The Undertaker then appeared at Elimination Chamber and cost Styles his match. The following night on Raw, Styles taunted Undertaker by bringing up his wife Michelle McCool, blaming her for why Undertaker keeps coming back to wrestle, while also calling Undertaker by his real name, Mark Calaway. Styles then challenged Undertaker to a match at WrestleMania. A contract signing for the match was conducted the following week. Styles then challenged Undertaker to a Boneyard match, and Undertaker accepted, cutting a promo akin to his "American Bad Ass" gimmick (circa 2000–2003).

==== Undercard matches ====
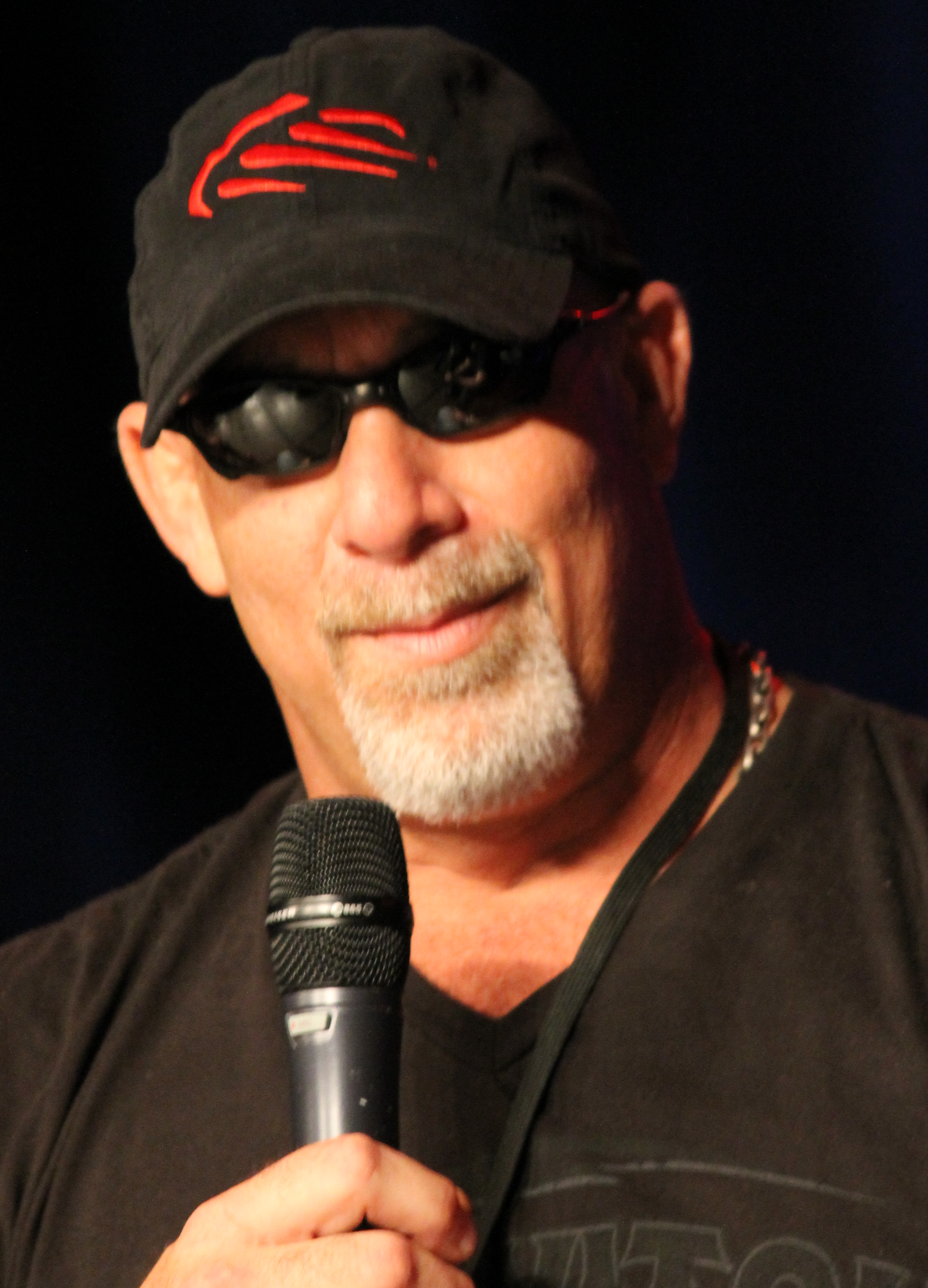
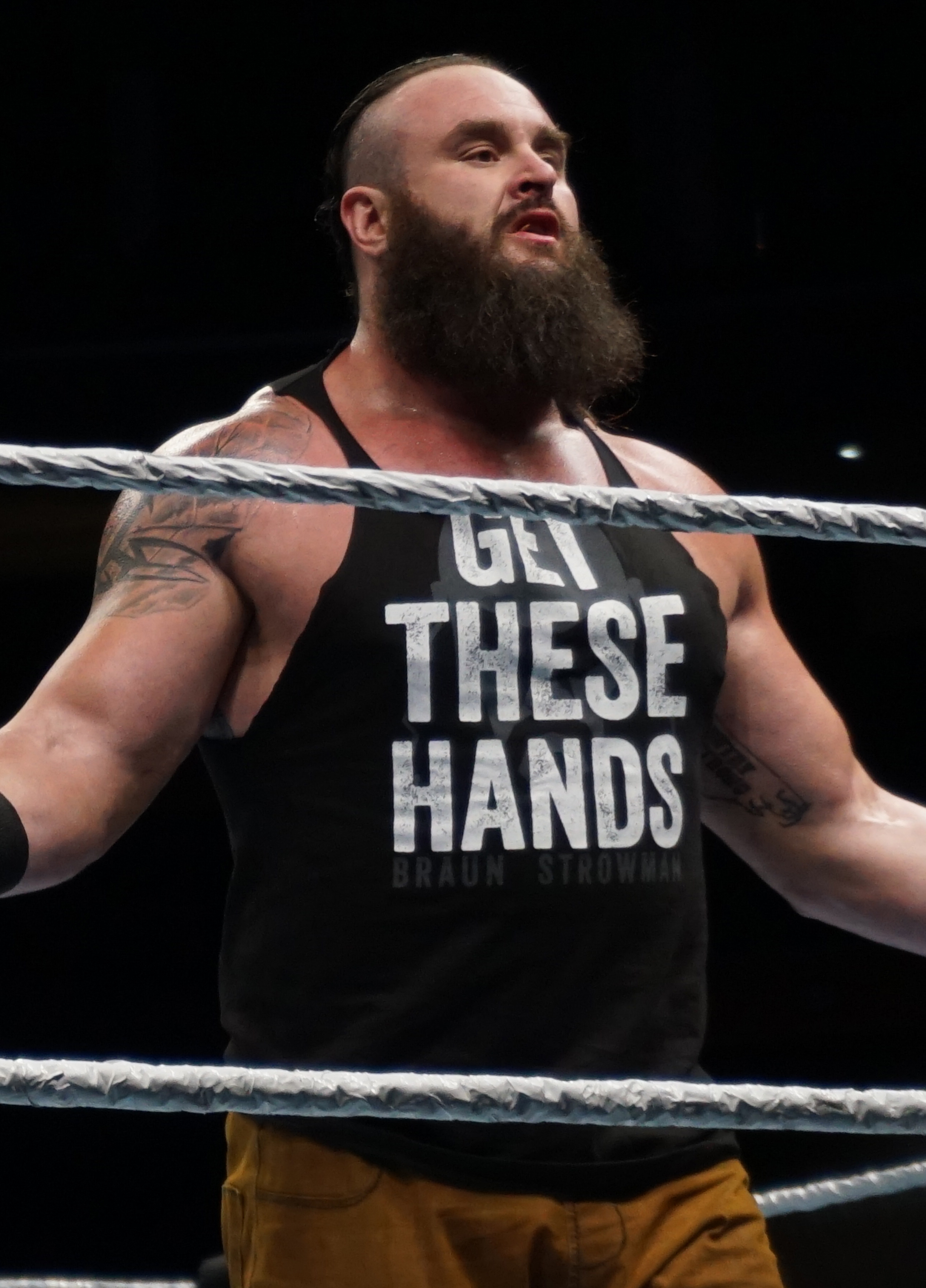
In the penultimate match of Part 1, Goldberg defended SmackDown's Universal Championship against Braun Strowman after his original opponent Roman Reigns withdrew from the event due to health concerns surrounding the COVID-19 pandemic.

After winning SmackDown's Universal Championship at Super ShowDown, WWE Hall of Famer Goldberg appeared on the following night's episode of SmackDown and issued an open challenge by stating his catchphrase, "Who's next?" Roman Reigns interrupted and had a stare down with Goldberg before accepting his challenge, which was subsequently scheduled for WrestleMania. Just before the event, however, Reigns requested to be removed from the match for being at an increased risk for COVID-19, as he was in an immunocompromised state from his previous health issues with leukemia; Reigns himself confirmed the report and stated that WWE honored the request. Triple H also confirmed the report in a March 29 interview on ESPN's SportsCenter. Five days later on the April 3 episode of SmackDown, Braun Strowman was announced as Reigns' replacement in the match, making this the first WrestleMania since WrestleMania XXVIII where Reigns was not featured.

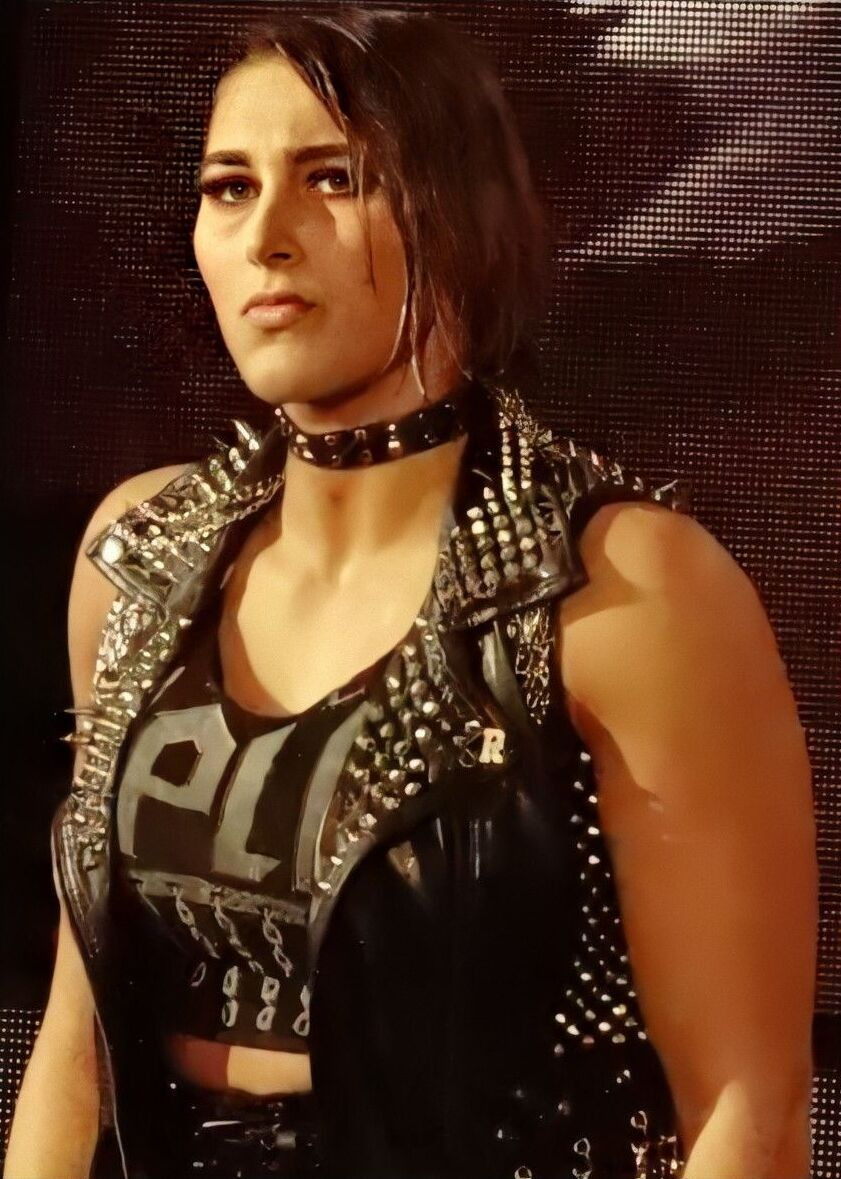
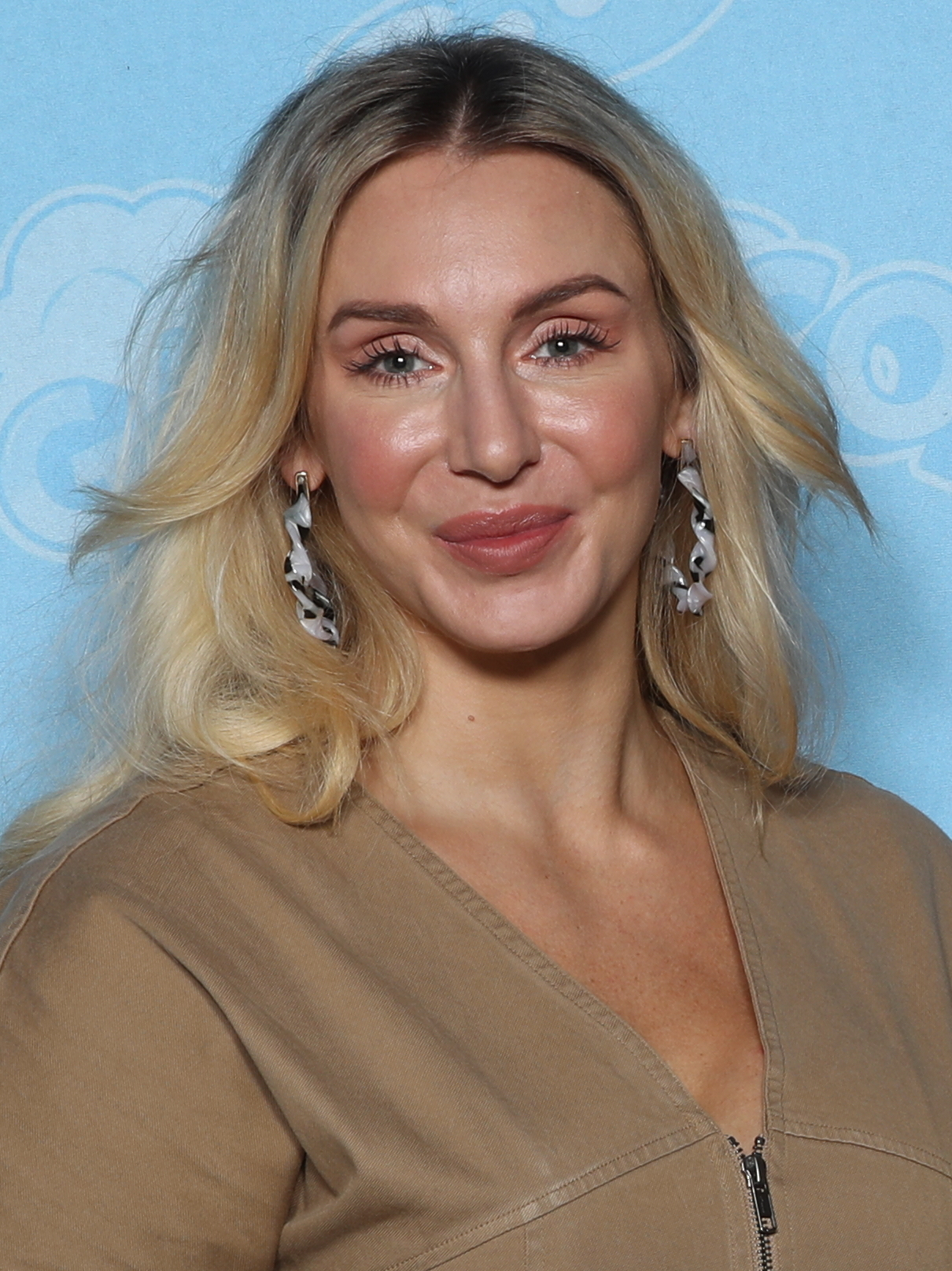
Rhea Ripley defended the NXT Women's Championship against 2020 Women's Royal Rumble winner Charlotte Flair in the opening match of Part 2.

At the Royal Rumble, Raw's Charlotte Flair won the women's Royal Rumble match to earn herself a women's championship match of her choosing at WrestleMania. On the February 3 episode of Raw, Flair stated that she had defeated the women's champions of both Raw and SmackDown and had held those titles multiple times. She was then interrupted by Rhea Ripley, the NXT Women's Champion—a title that Flair had only held once during NXT's infancy in 2014. Ripley declared that Flair should challenge her as she had defeated Flair, but Flair had never beat her. Flair continued to delay giving an answer until after Ripley had defended her title at NXT TakeOver: Portland on February 16. After Ripley retained her title at the event, she was ambushed by Flair, who accepted Ripley's challenge for a match at WrestleMania, marking the first time that a Royal Rumble winner chose an NXT championship to challenge for with the title itself being the first NXT championship to be defended at the event.

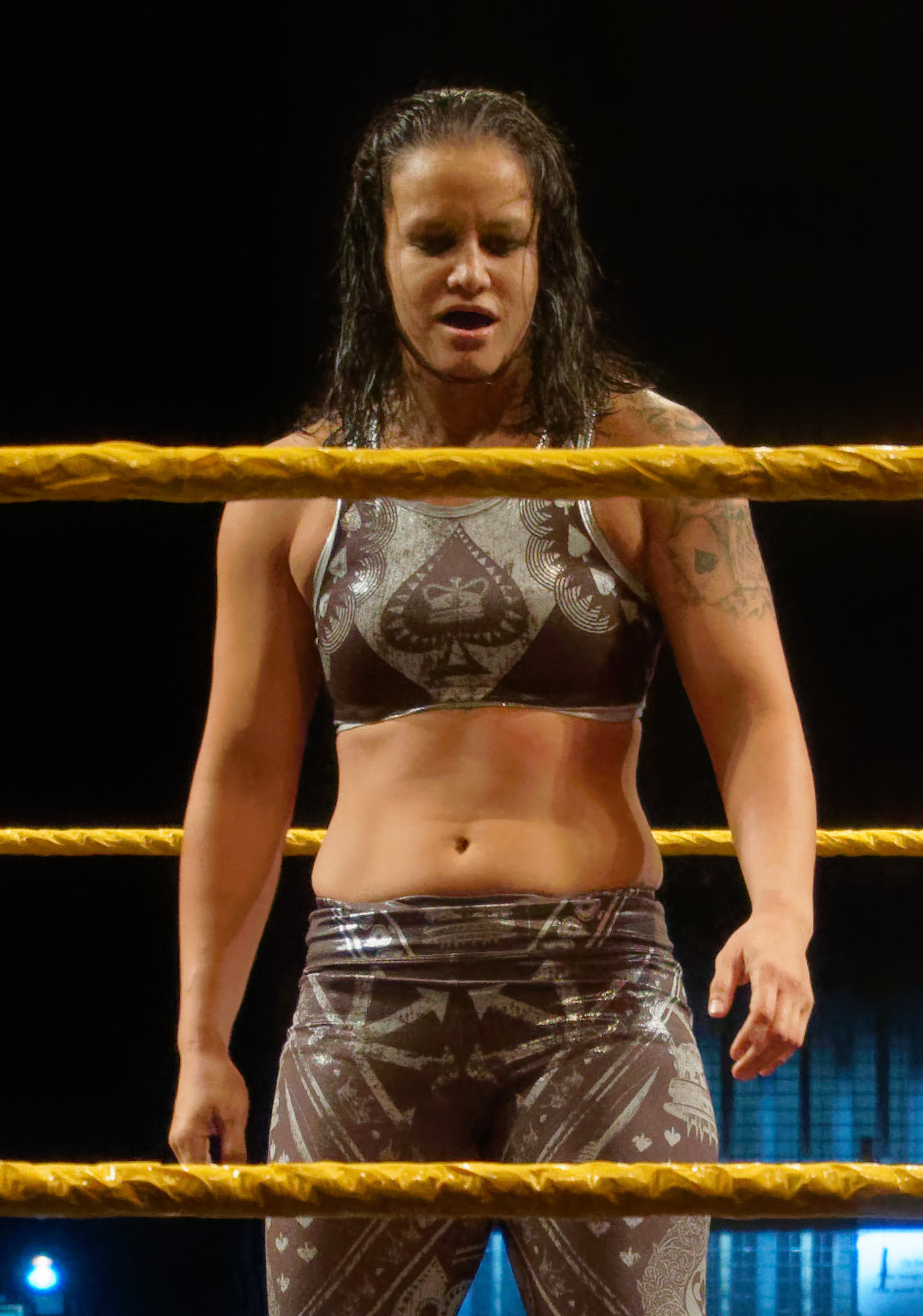
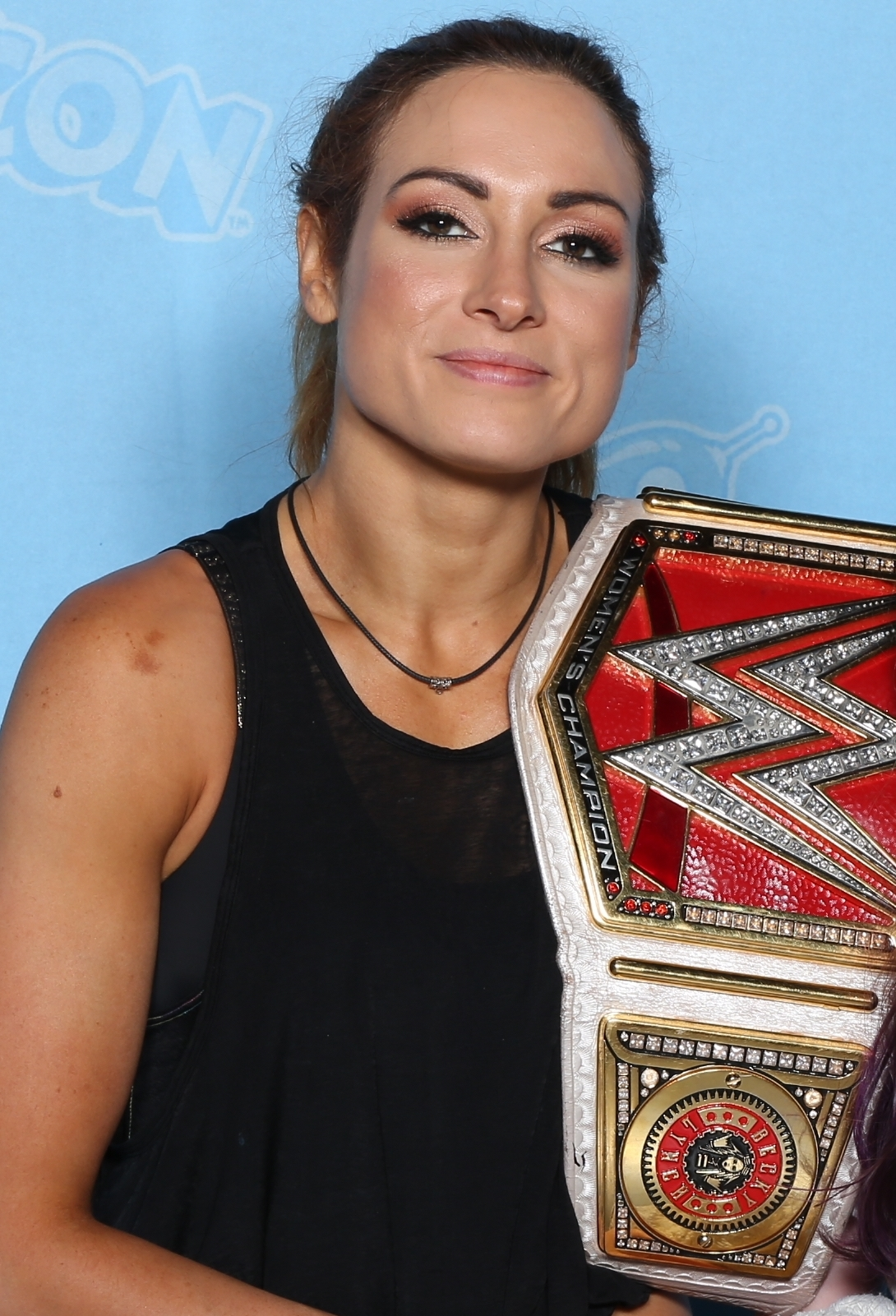
2020 Women's Elimination Chamber winner Shayna Baszler challenged Raw's Women's Champion Becky Lynch on Part 1.

Prior to Survivor Series, a rivalry began between Raw's Becky Lynch and NXT's Shayna Baszler. At the event, Baszler won the non-title brand supremacy triple threat match between the three brands' women's champions by submitting SmackDown Women's Champion Bayley. An irate Lynch attacked Baszler following the match and put her through an announce table. After losing the NXT Women's Championship, Baszler appeared as the 30th entrant in the women's Royal Rumble match, finishing as the runner-up. Following Lynch's title defense on the February 10 episode of Raw, Baszler ambushed Lynch and bit the back of her neck, thus reigniting their feud. Baszler was then entered into Raw's women's Elimination Chamber match at the namesake event where she single-handedly eliminated all of her opponents to win and earn herself a Raw Women's Championship match against Lynch at WrestleMania.

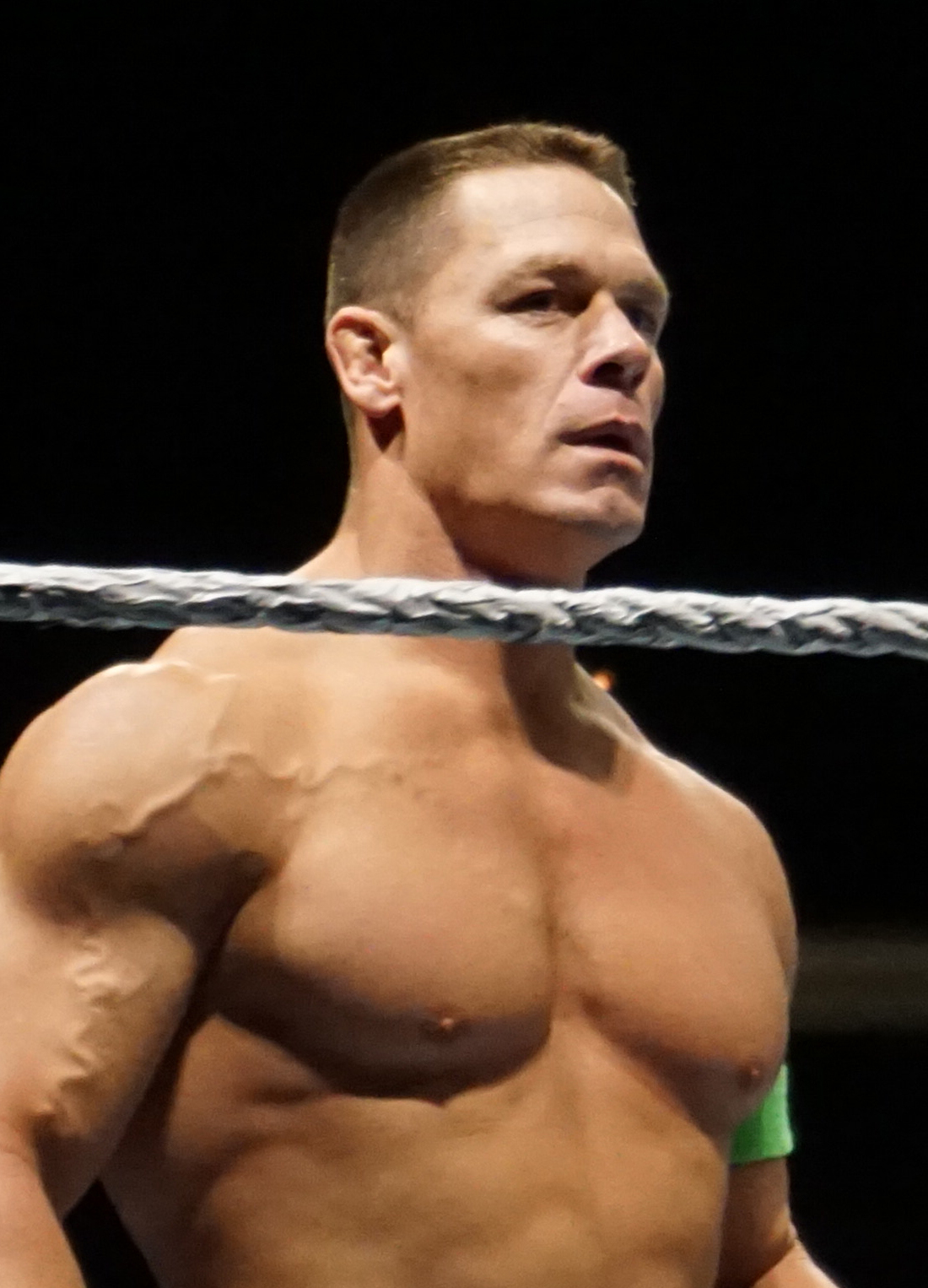
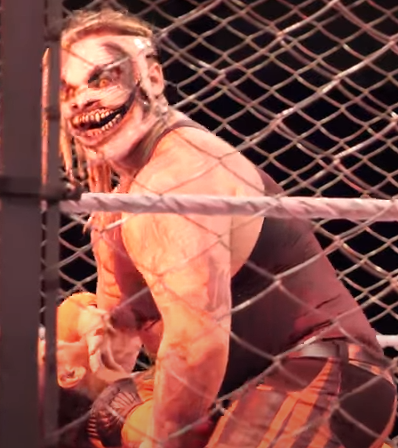
John Cena was challenged to a Firefly Fun House match by "The Fiend" Bray Wyat in the penultimate match of Part 2, a rematch from their previous bout at WrestleMania XXX in 2014.

John Cena, who had last appeared during Raw Reunion in July 2019, made his return from hiatus during the February 28, 2020, episode of SmackDown to address his role at WrestleMania. Seemingly announcing his retirement, Cena declared he would not be appearing at the event, stating that WrestleMania spots should be earned. As Cena gave a farewell salute to the audience from the stage, the lights went out. When they illuminated, "The Fiend" Bray Wyatt appeared behind Cena. The Fiend then pointed to the WrestleMania sign, signaling a challenge to Cena, who simply nodded in acceptance. A match between the two was then scheduled for the event. This was the second time the two fought each other at WrestleMania after WrestleMania XXX in April 2014. On the March 27 episode, Wyatt challenged Cena to a Firefly Fun House match, and Cena accepted.

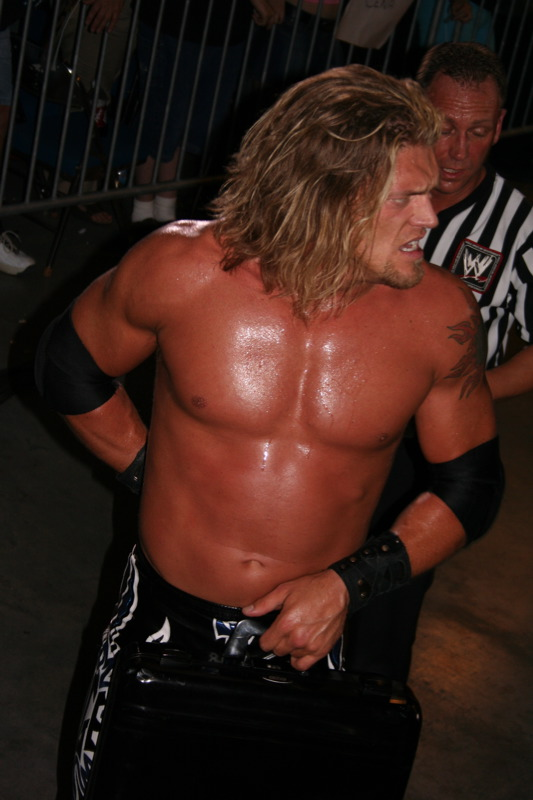
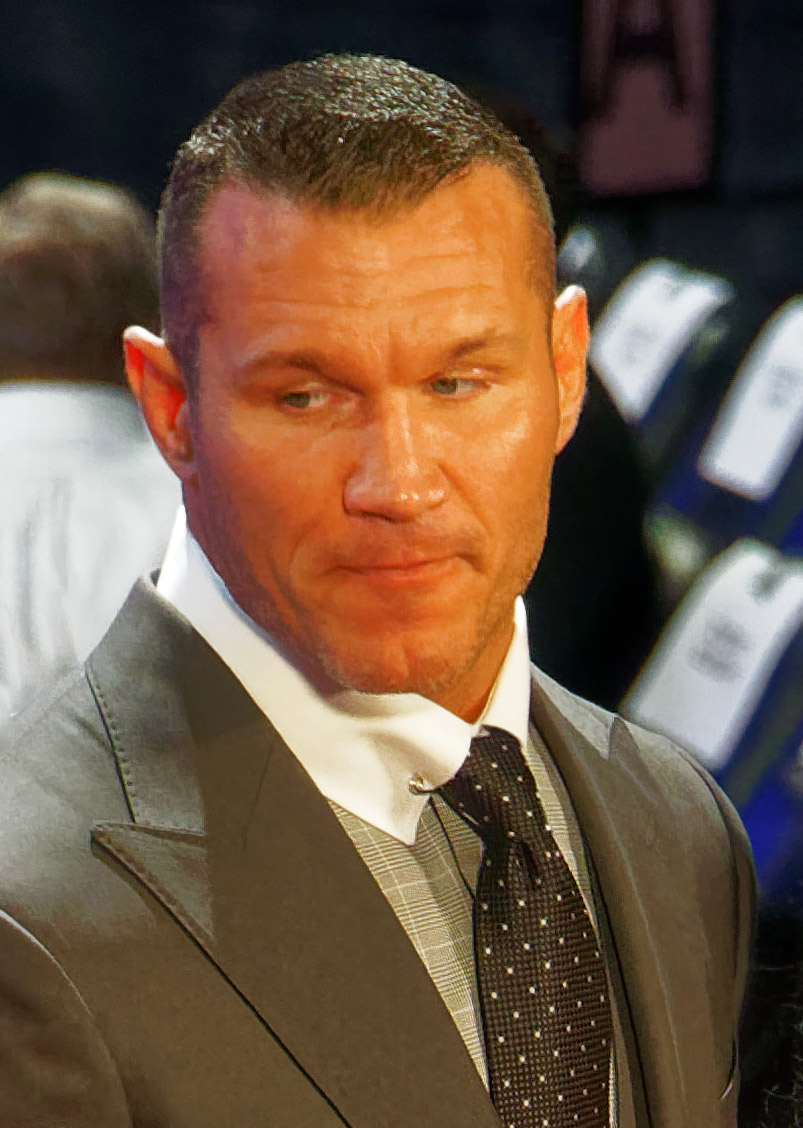
In his first singles match since 2011, Edge faced Randy Orton in a Last Man Standing match on Part 2.

After being forced to retire in 2011 due to a severe neck injury, WWE Hall of Famer Edge returned at the 2020 Royal Rumble during the namesake match, where he had a brief reunion with Randy Orton; Edge eliminated Orton before his own elimination. On the following Raw, Edge explained how he was able to make his return. Orton then welcomed Edge back and suggested reforming their tag team, Rated-RKO, but turned on Edge and performed an RKO on him, thus turning heel in the process. After attacking Edge's neck with a steel chair, Orton smashed Edge's head between two steel chairs in a maneuver known as the "Conchairto", which Edge had made famous in the past. Edge's wife and fellow Hall of Famer Beth Phoenix appeared on the March 2 episode to give a medical update on her husband. Orton interrupted and said that he attacked Edge so that he would remain at home and continue his role as a husband and a father to their children. He then blamed Phoenix for the attack, claiming that she allowed Edge to get back in the ring. Phoenix slapped Orton, who in turn performed an RKO on her. Edge returned the following week on Montel Vontavious Porter's (MVP) talk show, the "VIP Lounge". Orton attempted to attack Edge, only for Edge to perform an RKO of his own on Orton. After Orton retreated, Edge performed the Conchairto on MVP twice as a warning to Orton. Edge then challenged Orton to a Last Man Standing match at WrestleMania, and Orton accepted.

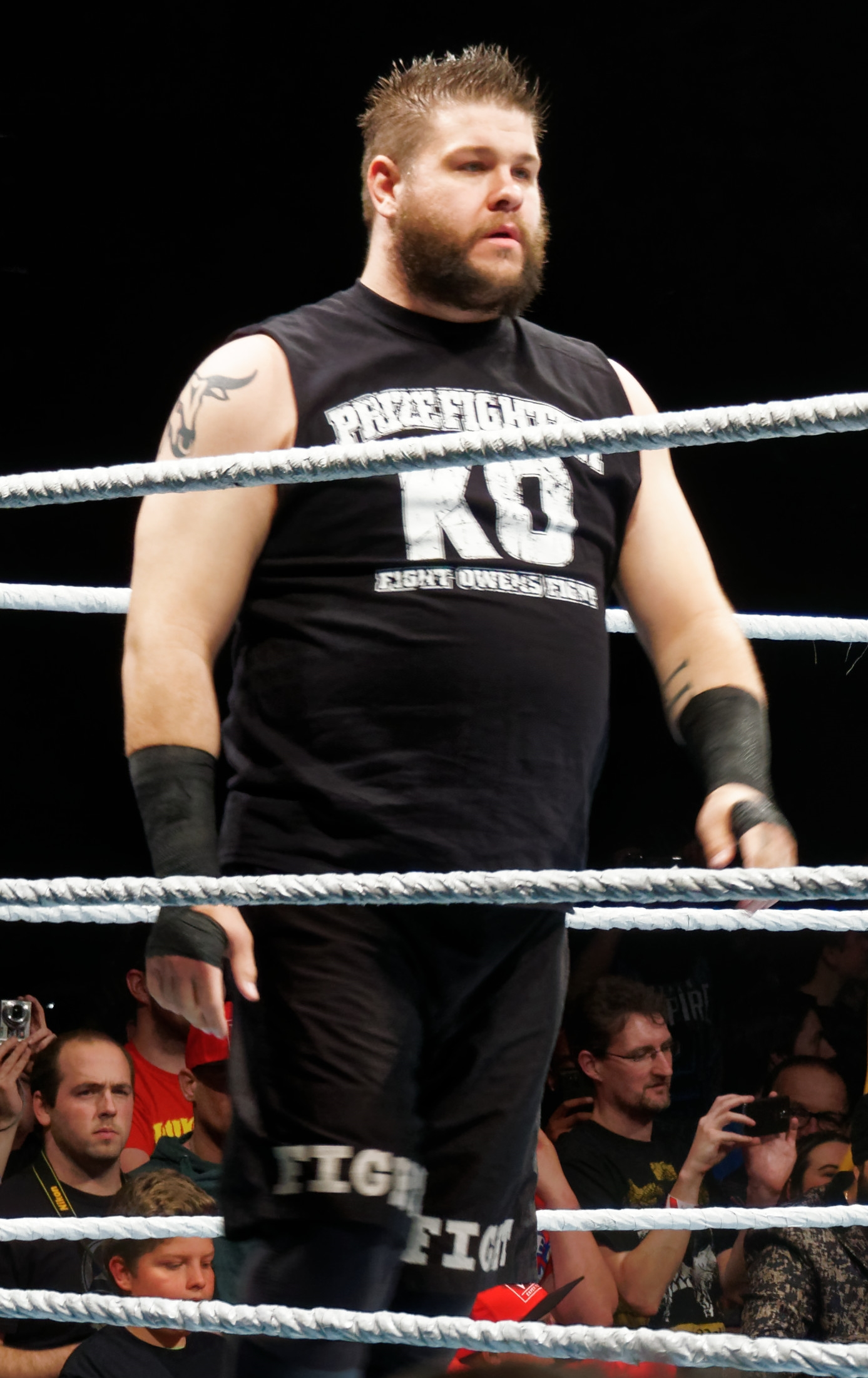
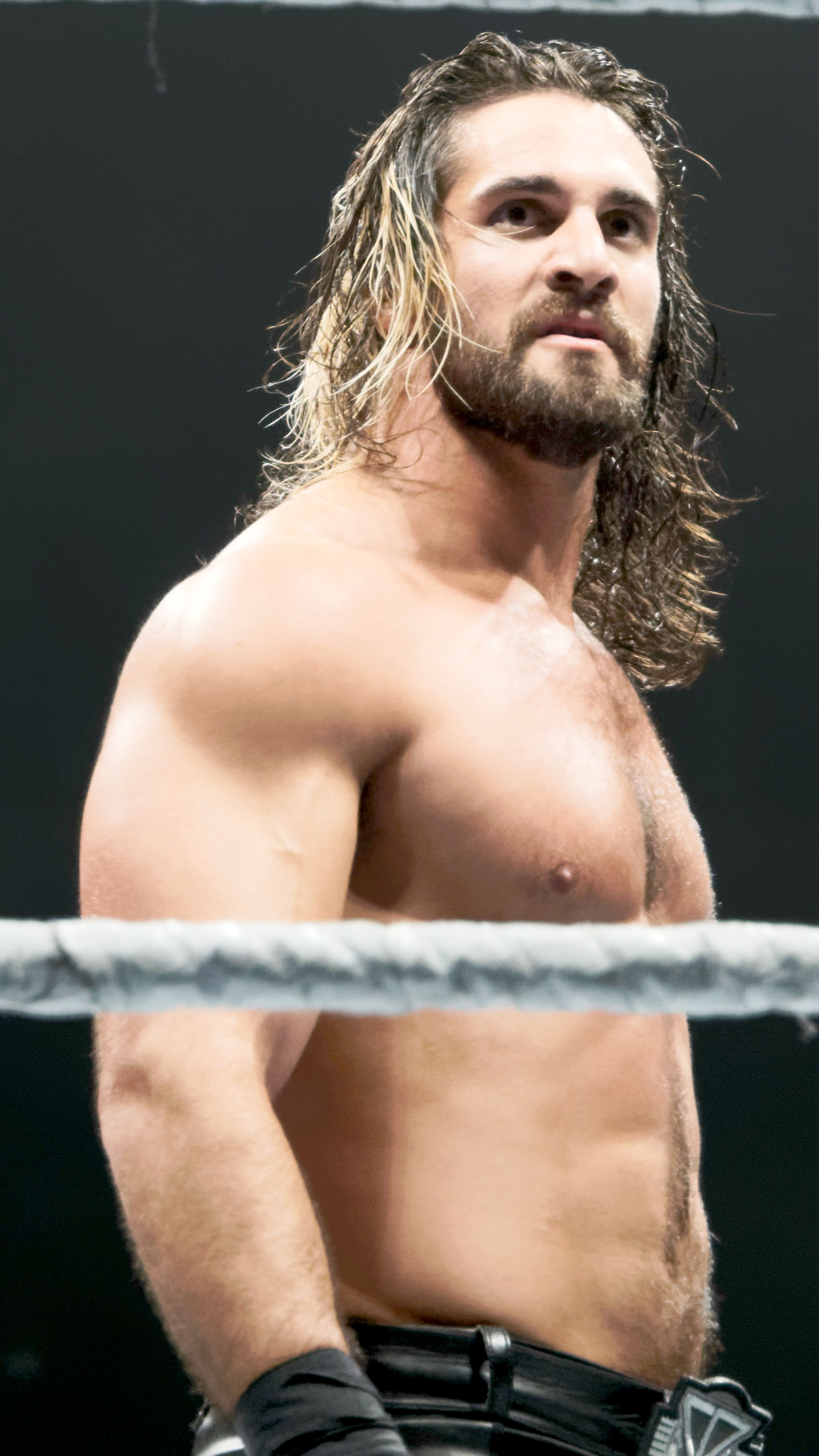
Kevin Owens faced Seth Rollins in what would become a No Disqualification match on Part 1.

At Survivor Series, Seth Rollins served as the captain of Team Raw for the men's Survivor Series match, but questioned Kevin Owens's loyalty to the team due to Owens appearing at NXT TakeOver: WarGames; Raw suffered a devastating loss at Survivor Series, only winning one of the seven interbrand matches. Rollins criticized the Raw roster for their poor performance and again questioned Owens's loyalty, who responded by performing a Stunner on Rollins. Owens then became the target of AOP (Akam and Rezar). Although Owens accused Rollins of being behind AOP's attacks, Rollins denied the accusations, though he ultimately joined with AOP, turning heel. Rollins then began to refer to himself as the "Monday Night Messiah" and recruited Murphy into his new faction with AOP; Rollins and Murphy eventually won the Raw Tag Team Championship together. At the Royal Rumble, Rollins eliminated Owens from the namesake match thanks to help from AOP and Murphy. Rollins and Murphy lost their title on an episode of Raw, and during a rematch at Elimination Chamber, Owens cost them their match and performed a Stunner on Rollins afterward. The following night on Raw, Rollins attacked Owens after an eight-man tag team match. On the March 16 episode, a match between Rollins and Owens was scheduled for WrestleMania.

On the Survivor Series Kickoff pre-show, Heavy Machinery (Otis and Tucker) participated in an interbrand tag team battle royal that was won by Dolph Ziggler and Robert Roode; the two teams entered into a feud following the event. Also during this time, Otis started a romance with Mandy Rose. On the February 14 episode of SmackDown, Otis had a scheduled Valentine's Day date with Rose; however, Ziggler arrived first and stole the date, causing Otis to walk away heartbroken. On the March 6 episode, Otis apologized to Rose, who rejected the apology. Heavy Machinery then participated in the SmackDown Tag Team Championship Elimination Chamber match, where they were eliminated by Ziggler and Roode. On the March 20 episode of SmackDown, Ziggler distracted Otis during his tag team match by showing pictures of him and Rose together, enraging Otis, which caused Heavy Machinery to get disqualified, thus costing them another title opportunity. Ziggler then challenged Otis to a match at WrestleMania and Otis accepted. On the final SmackDown before WrestleMania, a mysterious hacker (later revealed to be Mustafa Ali) appeared on the TitanTron during Ziggler's match with Tucker and revealed that Rose's Fire and Desire tag team partner Sonya Deville had conspired with Ziggler to sabotage Rose's Valentine's date with Otis.

On the March 6 episode of SmackDown, King Corbin was interviewed backstage about his plans for WrestleMania 36, but was interrupted by Elias. The following week, Corbin lost his match after Elias played his guitar, causing a distraction. On the March 20 episode, Corbin interrupted WrestleMania host Rob Gronkowski, which brought out Elias to perform a song about Corbin. Elias then tossed Corbin from the ring, and Gronkowski advocated for a match between the two at WrestleMania 36, which was made official on March 23.

== Event ==
=== Part 1 ===
Other on-screen personnel – Part 1
Role	Name
Host	Rob Gronkowski
English commentators	Michael Cole (SmackDown)
English commentators	John "Bradshaw" Layfield (SmackDown)
English commentators	Tom Phillips (Raw)
English commentators	Byron Saxton (Raw)
Portuguese commentator	Marco Alfaro
Spanish commentator	Marcelo Rodríguez
Ring announcers	Greg Hamilton (SmackDown)
Ring announcers	Mike Rome (Raw)
Referees	Danilo Anfibio
Referees	Jessika Carr
Referees	John Cone
Referees	Eddie Orengo
Referees	Charles Robinson
Referees	Drake Wuertz
Referees	Rod Zapata
Interviewers	Charly Caruso
Interviewers	Kayla Braxton
Pre-show panel	Corey Graves
Pre-show panel	Peter Rosenberg
Pre-show correspondents	Renee Young
Pre-show correspondents	Booker T
Pre-show correspondents	Mark Henry

==== Pre-show ====
During the WrestleMania 36 Kickoff Part 1 pre-show, Drew Gulak faced Cesaro. The climax saw Cesaro perform a U.F.O. on Gulak, followed by winning the match by pinfall.

==== Preliminary matches ====
The actual pay-per-view portion of Part 1 opened with a special statement from Stephanie McMahon and a performance of "America the Beautiful", which was edited together from multiple performances of the song from previous WrestleMania events. Host Rob Gronkowski began hyping WrestleMania. He was joined by his friend and WWE wrestler Mojo Rawley.

In the first match, The Kabuki Warriors (Asuka and Kairi Sane) defended the WWE Women's Tag Team Championship against Alexa Bliss and Nikki Cross. In the end, Cross performed the Purge on Sane followed by Bliss performing a Twisted Bliss to win and become the first two-time champions in the title's history.

Next, Elias faced King Corbin. In the end, as Corbin attempted a pin on Elias with his legs on the rope, the referee noticed it and voided the pinfall; Elias then performed a roll-up on a distracted Corbin, who was arguing with the referee, to win the match.

After that, Becky Lynch defended the Raw Women's Championship against Shayna Baszler. In the closing moments, as Baszler applied the Kirifuda Clutch on Lynch, Lynch countered into a roll-up to retain the title.

In the fourth match, Sami Zayn, accompanied by Cesaro and Shinsuke Nakamura, defended SmackDown's Intercontinental Championship against Daniel Bryan (accompanied by Drew Gulak). In the first half of the match, Zayn refused to face Bryan and continuously scurried away from him. Bryan would run after Zayn only for Cesaro and Nakamura to get in his way. This led to Gulak getting involved and temporarily taking out Cesaro and Nakamura. As Zayn wanted a countout victory, Bryan brought Zayn back into the ring and eventually started to perform his offensive attacks on him. In the end, Cesaro and Nakamura recovered and attacked Gulak. As Bryan attempted an aerial attack on Zayn, Zayn performed a Helluva Kick in mid-air to retain the title.

Next, the SmackDown Tag Team Championship was defended in a Triple Threat Ladder match. The match was originally scheduled as a tag team Triple Threat Ladder match in which The Miz and John Morrison were to defend the title against The Usos (Jey Uso and Jimmy Uso) and The New Day (Big E and Kofi Kingston), but due to Miz falling ill, the match was contested between Morrison, Jimmy, and Kingston, each representing their respective team. In the end, all three competitors together, who were atop ladders, managed to unhook the gold hook with the titles still intact. After a scuffle, Jimmy and Kingston performed a headbutt on Morrison, who fell down atop a ladder wedged between the rope and a second ladder. As Morrison fell, he grasped the title belts, unhooking them as he fell, thus Morrison retained the title for himself and Miz.

Afterward, Kevin Owens faced Seth Rollins. The match ended via disqualification for Owens, as Rollins attacked him with the ring bell. Owens then taunted Rollins to face him again in an accepted No Disqualification match. During the match, Owens attacked Rollins with the ring bell and performed a diving elbow drop off the WrestleMania sign. In the end, Owens performed a Stunner on Rollins to win the match.

In a small segment, 24/7 Champion R-Truth joined Rob Gronkowski and Mojo Rawley, who were standing atop a viewing podium. Gronkowski attempted to pin Truth to win the title. However, Rawley moved Gronkowski and pinned Truth instead to win the 24/7 title for a seventh time.

In the final match of Part 1 from the WWE Performance Center, Goldberg defended the Universal Championship against Braun Strowman, who replaced Roman Reigns. After a stare down, Goldberg surprised Strowman with a kick on the stomach and a throw into a corner. Goldberg attempted a Spear on Strowman into the corner, but Strowman dodged it and Goldberg collided into the ring post. After Strowman attempted a Running Powerslam, Goldberg reversed it into three Spears for a nearfall. Then, Goldberg performed a fourth Spear on Strowman. As Goldberg attempted a Jackhammer, Strowman reversed it into three Front Powerslams and a Running Powerslam for a pinfall, winning his first Universal Championship and the first world championship of his career.

==== Main event ====
In the main event of Part 1, The Undertaker faced AJ Styles in a Boneyard match (which was a Buried Alive match that took place at a custom built set in the Orlando area). A hearse arrived at the cemetery to The Undertaker's theme music, however, Styles emerged from the casket. The Undertaker then arrived riding a motorcycle (reminiscent of his "American Bad Ass" gimmick) to the tune of Metallica's "Now That We're Dead". Early on, Undertaker would refer to Styles as "Allen" (Styles' real first name) as AJ tried getting away. Halfway through the match, Styles' O.C. teammates Luke Gallows and Karl Anderson appeared in an attempt to assist Styles, but Undertaker fought them off. The Undertaker then fought a group of druids which were set up as a distraction by the O.C. so Styles could gain the upper hand again. Styles broke a shovel in half across The Undertaker's spine which caused him to fall into the grave. As Styles was preparing to fill the grave with dirt to win, Undertaker suddenly appeared behind Styles and started to attack him. Both men fought all over the graveyard and atop the warehouse. When Styles backed off from Undertaker on the rooftop, scared and in disbelief about him rising from the grave, Undertaker raised his arms to make a wall of fire appear behind Styles, preventing Styles from running away. The O.C. then saw a chance to go for another attack on Undertaker, who struck back yet again. He threw Gallows off the roof, performed a Tombstone Piledriver on Anderson and chokeslammed Styles off the roof and through an old piece of wooden flooring. Undertaker then carried Styles over to the grave, where Styles begged him not to be buried. Undertaker brought him to his feet, embraced him, praised Styles for his efforts, and told him he would not bury him. However, Undertaker feigned walking away, as he turned back around and kicked Styles into the grave. Undertaker then started the tractor and dumped all the dirt into the grave, burying Styles to win the match. Following the match, as the camera panned on the grave, Styles' hand was sticking out from the dirt, while Undertaker then departed on his motorcycle, riding off into the night. This would be The Undertaker's final match at WrestleMania as well as in his career, cementing his final WrestleMania record at 25–2.

=== Part 2 ===
Other on-screen personnel – Part 2
Role	Name
Hosts	Rob Gronkowski
Hosts	Titus O'Neil
English Commentators	Michael Cole (SmackDown)
English Commentators	John "Bradshaw" Layfield (SmackDown)
English Commentators	Tom Phillips (Raw/NXT Women's Championship match)
English Commentators	Byron Saxton (Raw/NXT Women's Championship match)
Portuguese commentator	Roberto Figueroa
Spanish commentator	Carlos Cabrera
Ring announcers	Greg Hamilton (SmackDown)
Ring announcers	Mike Rome (Raw/NXT Women's Championship match)
Referees	Danilo Anfibio
Referees	Shawn Bennett
Referees	John Cone
Referees	Darrick Moore
Referees	Eddie Orengo
Referees	Charles Robinson
Referees	Drake Wuertz
Interviewers	Charly Caruso
Interviewers	Kayla Braxton
Pre-show panel	Corey Graves
Pre-show panel	Peter Rosenberg
Pre-show correspondents	Renee Young
Pre-show correspondents	Booker T
Pre-show correspondents	Christian

==== Pre-show ====
During the WrestleMania 36 Kickoff Part 2 pre-show, Liv Morgan faced Natalya. In the end, Morgan pinned Natalya with a roll-up to win the match. This was Morgan's first WrestleMania win.

==== Preliminary matches ====
The actual pay-per-view portion of Part 2 opened with Rhea Ripley defending the NXT Women's Championship against Charlotte Flair. In the climax, after a back-and-forth match, Flair forced Ripley to tap out to the Figure-Eight Leglock to win the title for her second time, and the first time since NXT TakeOver in May 2014. Flair also became the first wrestler to win an NXT championship before and after NXT became one of WWE's three main brands.

Next, Aleister Black faced Bobby Lashley, accompanied by Lana. In the end, as Lashley attempted a spear on Black, Black performed a Black Mass on Lashley to win the match.

Afterward, Otis faced Dolph Ziggler (accompanied by Sonya Deville). In the closing moments, as Otis attempted to perform the Caterpillar on Ziggler, Deville distracted Otis on the ring apron, which allowed Ziggler to attack Otis with a low blow from behind. Mandy Rose then came out and attacked Deville. With the referee distracted, Rose performed a low blow on Ziggler. Otis then performed the Caterpillar on Ziggler to win the match. Following the match, Otis and Rose shared a kiss in the ring.

In the fourth match, Edge faced Randy Orton in a Last Man Standing match. As Edge waited for Orton to make his entrance, Orton disguised as a cameraman attacked Edge from behind with an RKO. Orton then attacked Edge with a second RKO and a camera, but Edge rose to his feet. Edge and Orton then fought in the Performance Center's gym area, where Orton placed Edge's arms in a sling and proceeded to attack him. As Orton attempted to attack Edge with a weight, Edge performed a dropkick on him. The two then fought back to the ringside area, where Orton threw Edge into a barricade off a raised platform. After fighting throughout the Performance Center, they eventually fought atop a production truck in the backstage area where Edge performed a spear on Orton and Orton performed an RKO on Edge. In the end, Edge applied a sleeper hold on Orton, who passed out on a chair. A conflicted Edge then performed the Conchairto on Orton. Edge won the match after Orton was unable to answer the referee's 10 count.

In a small segment, new 24/7 Champion Mojo Rawley ran away from multiple wrestlers into the Performance Center. They cornered Rawley near the podium that host Rob Gronkowski was standing on. Gronkowski witnessed this and performed a dive on top of the wrestlers. Gronkowski then pinned Rawley to win the 24/7 Championship.

Next, The Street Profits (Angelo Dawkins and Montez Ford) defended the Raw Tag Team Championship against Angel Garza and Austin Theory (with Zelina Vega). In the closing moments, Ford performed a springboard frog splash on Theory, who was then pinned by Dawkins. After the match, Garza, Theory, and Vega attacked The Street Profits. NXT's Bianca Belair then ran out and attacked Vega, clearing the ring.

After that, Bayley defended the SmackDown Women's Championship in a fatal five-way elimination match against Sasha Banks, Lacey Evans, Naomi, and Tamina. Tamina was the first eliminated after the other wrestlers piled on top of her for the pin. Banks applied the Bank Statement on Naomi to eliminate her. As Bayley attempted a dropkick on Evans in the corner, Evans moved out of the way and Bayley attacked Banks instead. After Bayley tried apologizing, Bayley pushed Banks out of the way of an attack from Evans, who performed the Woman's Right on Banks to eliminate her. Bayley did not attempt to break up the pin to save Banks. In the end, as Evans was about to perform the Woman's Right on Bayley, Banks returned to the ring and performed a backstabber on Evans. Bayley performed a Rose Plant on Evans to retain the title.

The penultimate match was the Firefly Fun House match between John Cena and "The Fiend" Bray Wyatt. Cena came out for his match in the Performance Center, assuming his match was taking place in the ring. Wyatt was then shown in the Firefly Fun House, stating that Cena would actually be facing himself before exiting through the fun house's door. Cena was then teleported to the Firefly Fun House. After also going through the door, Cena was transported through a series of dream sequences where Wyatt demonstrated his perceived personality flaws (such as being a bully who did not have to work for his achievements like Wyatt did), including his debut appearance on SmackDown (with Wyatt acting as Kurt Angle, and Cena seemingly unable to say anything but "ruthless aggression"), and a spoof of Saturday Night's Main Event (where Wyatt introduced Cena as his tag team partner "Johnny Largemeat", who was tired out from repeatedly lifting weights). Appearing as his old cult leader persona of The Wyatt Family, Wyatt then reminisced about his loss to Cena at WrestleMania XXX, and pledged to right his previous wrong. Back in a ring, Cena reversed out of an attempted Sister Abigail by Wyatt, and was (as in that previous match) coerced into using a chair against him. However, as he did so, Wyatt disappeared, and Cena was suddenly transported to nWo Monday Nitro—with Wyatt acting as Eric Bischoff, who introduced Cena, acting as "Hollywood" Hulk Hogan. In the ring, Cena tackled Wyatt. After a fury of fists, Wyatt disappeared and was replaced by the Huskus the Pig Boy puppet. The Fiend then snuck up from behind and performed Sister Abigail and the Mandible Claw on Cena to win the match, with Wyatt's normal self counting the pin. Just before The Fiend performed Sister Abigail, the audio of Cena's promo from SmackDown was played, where Cena had stated that at WrestleMania, he would end the existence of the "most over hyped, over valued, over privileged WWE Superstar". After the segment ended, a visibly shaken Titus O'Neil was shown on camera, uttering "I don't know what I just saw".

==== Main event ====
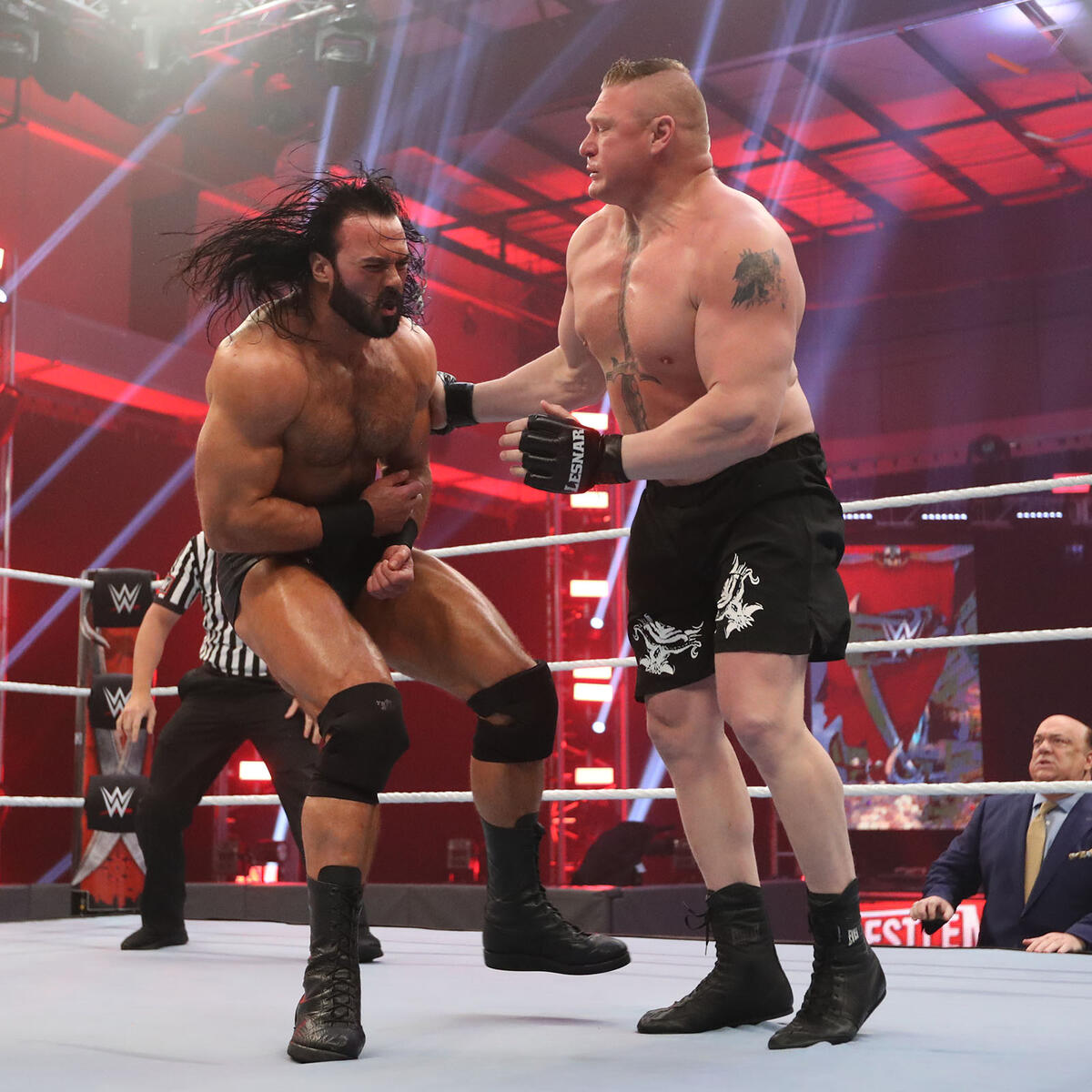
Accompanied by Paul Heyman (far right), Brock Lesnar (right) strikes Drew McIntyre (left) inside the WWE Performance Center without an audience.

In the main event of Part 2, Brock Lesnar (accompanied by Paul Heyman) defended the WWE Championship against Drew McIntyre. McIntyre hit Brock Lesnar with a Claymore on Lesnar for a nearfall. Lesnar performed three German suplexes and an F-5, but McIntyre kicked out at one. Lesnar then performed two more F-5s, both of which again resulted in nearfalls. As Lesnar went for a fourth F-5, McIntyre countered and performed three more Claymores on Lesnar to win the match and title, capturing his first world championship in WWE and becoming the first-ever British-born world champion in WWE history, as well as WWE's 31st Triple Crown champion.

After the show went off the air, McIntyre was confronted by Big Show, who McIntyre then faced in a title defense described by WWE as the "hidden WrestleMania main event". After an even match, McIntyre reversed a chokeslam attempt in a bodyslam for a near-fall. As McIntyre attempted an aerial maneuver, Big Show countered with a chokeslam for a near-fall. Big Show went for the KO punch, but McIntyre ducked and performed a Claymore on Big Show to retain the title. This dark match aired on the April 6 episode of Raw.

== Reception ==
The event was highly positively received by fans and received positive reviews from critics. While most argued that the event suffered from both a poor lead-up and the absence of a live audience (partly due to most of the wrestlers being removed from the event shortly before its filming, mostly in relation to the pandemic, including Roman Reigns, The Miz, Andrade, and Dana Brooke, who were all slated to defend or challenge for championships) many felt that the event exceeded expectations, with both critics and fans largely praising the Boneyard and Firefly Fun House matches as the best of the event for their uniqueness and over-the-top tone (and in the case of the latter, its inventiveness and humor). The male world title matches were criticized for their short lengths and overuse of finishing moves.

Brent Brookhouse of CBS Sports gave the event a positive review, acknowledging that "many fans were understandably hesitant to believe WWE could deliver a spectacle deserving of the WrestleMania title, but somehow the company pulled off the seemingly impossible by delivering two nights of compelling wrestling without tens of thousands of fans in attendance". He ranked the Boneyard and Firefly Fun House matches as the best for Part 1 and 2, respectively, noting that in contrast to previous attempts by WWE to "recreate Matt Hardy's 'Broken Universe' magic", the first "nailed the execution by striking the right balance between tense action and over-the-top presentation", and the second was described as "indie psychological horror movies brought to professional wrestling."

Randall Colburn of The A.V. Club gave the event a B−. While praising WWE for making the most out of its "weirdest WrestleMania of all time", particularly the Boneyard match, he did point out that most matches suffered from its poor lead-up and lack of live audience, stating notably that Becky Lynch and Shayna Baszler's match was "a listless and too-short battle that, when you consider the response both performers tend to extract from crowds, might have shifted into another gear in a packed stadium". He also cited examples of "shoddy storytelling", noting that it "[was] great that Braun Strowman beat the snot out of Goldberg, but it might have resonated more if the company hadn't just had the 53-year old Goldberg destroy The Fiend, a heretofore untouchable star, during a PPV in Saudi Arabia—and, you know, done anything with Braun over the past few years".

David Bixenspan of Slate heavily criticized the lead-up to the event, stating that "[The wrestlers], in the weeks leading up to WrestleMania, looked significantly more like they were doing bad playacting and play-fighting than they usually do. Others decided to play to a crowd that wasn't actually there. ... the WWE style—with its emphasis on overwrought capital–P 'performance,' over-rehearsed matches, and flowery mannerisms—looked more like a parody when staged in front of zero spectators. Still, expectations for this WrestleMania were low, albeit with some minor optimism over the show being divided up into two nights instead of the marathon one-night slogs of recent years". However, he stated that after two lackluster opening matches, the card from Lynch vs. Baszler onward then comprised "very physical matches [which] made the best of the setting, and with most of the matches fitting that bill, [Part 1] was really strong overall", although he found Part 2 much weaker, stating that Edge vs. Randy Orton was "glacially slow, and it appeared to somehow be edited out of an even longer match", and that Lesnar vs. McIntyre felt "more like a formality than anything cool, because it was so paint-by-numbers". Slate considered the Boneyard and Firefly Fun House matches to be the best matches.

Anthony Mango of Bleacher Report stated "It's hard to judge this event. You have to take the good with the bad, maintain honest integrity with criticism, but also be forgiving and acknowledge that this was not how WrestleMania was supposed to be". He gave a positive review, although he ranked Elias vs. Corbin, Black vs. Lashley, and the SmackDown Women's title match as the low points of the event. Jake Rill, also of Bleacher Report, gave the Boneyard match a 4.5 star ratings on a scale of 5, their highest rated match from both nights, while giving the Universal Championship match a 0.5 star, their lowest rated match from the event.

Despite having no attendance due to the circumstances, WrestleMania 36 was the most-viewed event in WWE history with a record 967 million views combining both nights across the company's digital and social platforms. The Hollywood Reporter noted that the Boneyard and Firefly Fun House matches could set a precedent for WWE using more "cinematic experiences" in its programming to make up for the closed door tapings.

== Aftermath ==
In late-April, it was revealed that WrestleMania host Rob Gronkowski had come out of his NFL retirement, where he was traded to the Tampa Bay Buccaneers. It was later revealed that Gronkowski exercised a release clause in his WWE contract in order to return to the NFL, and he dropped the 24/7 Championship to R-Truth in a segment on the June 1 episode of Raw. Wrestling journalist Dave Meltzer noted that before his release, Gronkowski was scheduled to work a match at SummerSlam as well as WWE's Saudi Arabia show later in the year. He also said that the release was "mutual".

In May, a five-part documentary series about The Undertaker began airing on the WWE Network called Undertaker: The Last Ride. The documentary series chronicles The Undertaker's career from 2017 to 2020 and his decision on when he should retire, which he previously believed was going to be his match with Roman Reigns at WrestleMania 33. In the final episode that released on June 21, Undertaker stated that he had nothing left to prove and had no desire to step in the ring again, feeling that his match with AJ Styles was the perfect ending to his 30-year career, thus making his WrestleMania 36 match with Styles his final match. However, he did not rule out the possibility of a potential one-off match, depending on the situation. Undertaker also revealed that he did not make a full return to his American Bad Ass gimmick at WrestleMania 36. Instead, it was a combination of his Deadman persona, the American Bad Ass, as well as his real life self; the latter due to how personal Styles' promos were against Undertaker. The Undertaker's official retirement ceremony later occurred at Survivor Series on November 22, which also celebrated the 30th anniversary of his debut in WWE, which occurred at the 1990 Survivor Series.

This would also be the final WrestleMania to livestream on the American version of the WWE Network, which merged under Peacock in April 2021, just prior to WrestleMania 37.

=== Raw ===
The following night's episode of Raw showed the "hidden WrestleMania main event", in which Drew McIntyre retained the WWE Championship over Big Show roughly 25 minutes after McIntyre had defeated Brock Lesnar to win the title.

Raw Women's Champion Becky Lynch praised Shayna Baszler regarding their WrestleMania match and stated that Baszler knew where to find her if she wanted to face off again. The following week, Baszler won her qualifying match to compete in the women's Money in the Bank ladder match.

Raw Tag Team Champions The Street Profits (Angelo Dawkins and Montez Ford) faced Austin Theory and Angel Garza (accompanied by Zelina Vega) in a rematch for the titles where the champions retained once again, though by disqualification, thanks to Vega. Bianca Belair again came out after the match, and challenged Vega to a match which ended in a no-contest. A six-person mixed tag team match ensued with The Street Profits and Belair defeating Theory, Garza, and Vega.

Charlotte Flair boasted about defeating Rhea Ripley and becoming a two-time NXT Women's Champion, though said that Ripley was "okay". Ripley returned on the May 6 episode of NXT to save Io Shirai from a post-match beat down after Flair had retained the title against Shirai due to disqualification. This ultimately set up a triple threat match between the three women at TakeOver: In Your House.

On the April 13 episode, Seth Rollins stated that by losing to Kevin Owens at WrestleMania, he had been crucified and now he had truly risen (buying into his "Monday Night Messiah" gimmick). He later attacked WWE Champion Drew McIntyre following the latter's match with Andrade. He subsequently set up a title match for Money in the Bank.

On the May 11 episode of Raw, both Edge and Randy Orton made their first post-WrestleMania appearances. Orton stated that at WrestleMania, the better man won but questioned whether or not the better wrestler had actually won. Noting that the Royal Rumble and Last Man Standing matches were non-traditional matches, Orton challenged Edge to a normal singles match at Backlash, which Orton won. During the match, Edge legitimately tore his triceps. After recovering from his triceps tear, Edge returned at the 2021 Royal Rumble, where he and Orton entered at number one and two, respectively. The two brawled at ringside, and Edge injured Orton's leg, taking Orton out for the majority of the match. Orton returned in the closing moments of the match where he attempted to eliminate Edge, however, Edge countered and eliminated Orton to win the men's Royal Rumble match. Orton then faced Edge in a rubber match the following night on Raw, where thanks to a distraction by Alexa Bliss (as part of a storyline between Orton, Bliss, and "The Fiend" Bray Wyatt), Edge defeated Orton, putting an end to their rivalry.

=== SmackDown ===
On the following episode of SmackDown, Bray Wyatt interrupted new Universal Champion Braun Strowman after the latter's match. Wyatt reminded Strowman that it was he who brought him to WWE with his old Wyatt Family stable. Wyatt, who had lost the title to Goldberg at Super ShowDown, then stated he wanted his title back and Strowman accepted the challenge, which was scheduled for Money in the Bank, though against Wyatt's normal self instead of The Fiend.

Also on the following SmackDown, Tamina pointed out the fact that Bayley nor any other competitor in the fatal five-way elimination match actually beat her and challenged Bayley to a singles match for the SmackDown Women's Championship. Bayley agreed if Tamina could defeat her friend Sasha Banks, which Tamina subsequently did the following week to earn the title match at Money in the Bank. On the April 24 episode, Evans defeated Banks to qualify for the women's Money in the Bank ladder match due to an untimely assist from Bayley. The following week, Tamina's backstage interview was interrupted by Banks, and she and Bayley attacked her until Evans made the save. On the May 8 episode, Evans and Tamina defeated Banks and Bayley with Tamina pinning Bayley.

On the following SmackDown, new WWE Women's Tag Team Champions Alexa Bliss and Nikki Cross retained their titles in a rematch against The Kabuki Warriors (Asuka and Kairi Sane). Since only one member of each team competed for the SmackDown Tag Team Championship at WrestleMania, The New Day's Big E suggested that the other team members should face off in a triple threat match for the titles. The match occurred the following week, in which Big E defeated Jey Uso and The Miz to win the SmackDown Tag Team Championship for a record eighth time for The New Day.

Also on the following SmackDown, Heavy Machinery's Tucker faced Dolph Ziggler in a rematch from the SmackDown prior to WrestleMania in a losing effort; Otis and Mandy Rose were absent that night. The following week, Sonya Deville called out Rose to clear the air between them. An emotional Deville stated that Rose was the most selfish person she had met. Deville also stated that she was the better wrestler and Rose was nothing more than eye candy. Ziggler then came out and stated to Rose that she could not deny the chemistry between them. Deville attacked Rose, which prompted Otis to come out and attack Ziggler. On the May 1 episode, Otis defeated Ziggler again to qualify for the men's Money in the Bank ladder match. Also that same episode, Rose lost her Money in the Bank qualifying match due to a distraction from Deville, who attacked Rose after the match. The following week, Deville defeated Rose. Rose and Deville would continue feuding until SummerSlam, where Rose defeated Deville in a no disqualification loser leaves WWE match.

Elias sang a song about his win over King Corbin at WrestleMania 36. The following week, Elias was about to make another performance, but was viciously attacked by Corbin, who bashed the guitar on Elias' back. Elias returned at Money in the Bank, where he cost Corbin the men's Money in the Bank ladder match. On the following episode of SmackDown, Corbin defeated Elias in a WrestleMania rematch to advance in the tournament for the vacant Intercontinental Championship.

It would be two years before Roman Reigns and Goldberg would have their originally scheduled match for the Universal Championship. Reigns made his return at the 2020 SummerSlam and won the title at Payback. Reigns remained champion for over the next year and into 2022. In February 2022, Goldberg confronted Reigns and set up a match between the two for the title at Elimination Chamber. At the event, Reigns defeated Goldberg to retain the title.

=== Further effects of COVID-19 ===
The COVID-19 pandemic had further effects on WWE following WrestleMania. Raw, SmackDown, 205 Live, and pay-per-views continued to be broadcast from the Performance Center until August before relocating to Orlando's Amway Center with a new virtual fan viewing experience called the ThunderDome—they then moved to Tropicana Field in St. Petersburg, Florida in December and then Yuengling Center in Tampa in April 2021. Mid-year, 205 Live began doing their tapings in conjunction with NXT. Broadcasts of NXT were done from its home base of Full Sail University in Winter Park, Florida until October when NXT was relocated to the Performance Center, rebranded as the Capitol Wrestling Center, NXT's version of the ThunderDome and an homage to WWE's predecessor, the Capitol Wrestling Corporation. Furthermore, WWE released several talent due to budget cuts as a result of the pandemic. These included Hall of Famer Kurt Angle, Rusev, Drake Maverick, Zack Ryder, Curt Hawkins, Karl Anderson, Luke Gallows, Heath Slater, Eric Young, Rowan, Sarah Logan, No Way Jose, Mike Chioda, Mike Kanellis, Maria Kanellis, EC3, Aiden English, Lio Rush, The Colóns (Primo and Epico), and Cain Velasquez, and many other behind-the-scenes employees. However, following his loss in the final of the interim NXT Cruiserweight Championship tournament, Maverick re-signed with the company, and it was reported that WWE had reached out to some of the other released talent, though for lower pay than their previous contracts.

While WrestleMania 37 was initially announced for SoFi Stadium in Inglewood, California, in October 2020, the Wrestling Observer Newsletter reported that WWE would consider relocating the event to Raymond James Stadium in order to allow for in-person attendance at a reduced capacity, which was not possible under California's health orders; Florida lifted those restrictions in late-August 2020. WWE officially announced the move on January 16, 2021, and it was the first WWE event to have ticketed fans in attendance during the pandemic with a limited capacity of 25,000 spectators for each night and with COVID-19 safety protocols in place. WWE then returned to live touring with full capacity crowds in mid-July.

== Results ==
Night 1 (April 4)
No.	Results	Stipulations	Times
1^{P}	Cesaro defeated Drew Gulak by pinfall	Singles match	4:25
2	Alexa Bliss and Nikki Cross defeated The Kabuki Warriors (Asuka and Kairi Sane) (c) by pinfall	Tag team match for the WWE Women's Tag Team Championship	15:05
3	Elias defeated King Corbin by pinfall	Singles match	9:00
4	Becky Lynch (c) defeated Shayna Baszler by pinfall	Singles match for the WWE Raw Women's Championship	8:30
5	Sami Zayn (c) (with Cesaro and Shinsuke Nakamura) defeated Daniel Bryan (with Drew Gulak) by pinfall	Singles match for the WWE Intercontinental Championship	9:20
6	John Morrison (c) defeated Jimmy Uso and Kofi Kingston by retrieving the championship belts (Note: This match was scheduled to be a tag team triple threat ladder match with The Miz and John Morrison defending the title against The Usos (Jey Uso and Jimmy Uso), and The New Day (Big E and Kofi Kingston). Due to The Miz contracting an illness, he was removed from the card and the match was changed to a standard triple threat ladder match with one participant from each of the three teams. The wrestler who won the match was awarded the WWE SmackDown Tag Team Championship for their respective team.)	Triple threat ladder match for the WWE SmackDown Tag Team Championship	18:30
7	Kevin Owens defeated Seth Rollins by pinfall	No Disqualification match (Note: The match started as a standard singles match which Owens initially won via disqualification. The match was restarted as a No Disqualification match.)	17:20
8	Braun Strowman defeated Goldberg (c) by pinfall	Singles match for the WWE Universal Championship	2:10
9	The Undertaker defeated AJ Styles (with Luke Gallows and Karl Anderson)	Boneyard match	35:00
(c) / – the champion(s) heading into the match; P / – the match was broadcast on the pre-show

Night 2 (April 5)
No.	Results	Stipulations	Times
1^{P}	Liv Morgan defeated Natalya by pinfall	Singles match	6:25
2	Charlotte Flair defeated Rhea Ripley (c) by submission	Singles match for the NXT Women's Championship	20:30
3	Aleister Black defeated Bobby Lashley (with Lana) by pinfall	Singles match	7:20
4	Otis defeated Dolph Ziggler (with Sonya Deville) by pinfall	Singles match	8:15
5	Edge defeated Randy Orton as Orton was unable to make it to his feet before the referee's count of 10	Last Man Standing match	36:55
6	The Street Profits (Angelo Dawkins and Montez Ford) (c) defeated Angel Garza and Austin Theory (with Zelina Vega) by pinfall	Tag team match for the WWE Raw Tag Team Championship	6:20
7	Bayley (c) defeated Sasha Banks, Lacey Evans, Naomi, and Tamina	Fatal five-way elimination match for the WWE SmackDown Women's Championship	19:20
8	"The Fiend" Bray Wyatt defeated John Cena by "pinfall"	Firefly Fun House match	13:00
9	Drew McIntyre defeated Brock Lesnar (c) (with Paul Heyman) by pinfall	Singles match for the WWE Championship	4:35
10^{D}	Drew McIntyre (c) defeated Big Show by pinfall (Note: The match was shown on the April 6, 2020, episode of Raw.)	Singles match for the WWE Championship	6:55
(c) / – the champion(s) heading into the match; P / – the match was broadcast on the pre-show; D / – this was a dark match

=== SmackDown Women's Championship Fatal 5-Way match eliminations ===
Eliminated	Wrestler	Eliminated by	Method	Times
1	Tamina	Bayley, Naomi, Lacey Evans, and Sasha Banks	Pinfall	6:35
2	Naomi	Sasha Banks	Submission	10:20
3	Sasha Banks	Lacey Evans	Pinfall	13:25
4	Lacey Evans	Bayley	Pinfall	19:20
Winner	Bayley (c)	—N/a		19:20
