= IWA Mid-South Deathmatch Championship =

Professional wrestling championship

Details
- Promotion: Independent Wrestling Association Mid-South
- Date established: February 9, 2007
- Date retired: August 28, 2009
Statistics
- First champion(s): Drake Younger
- Final champion(s): Devon Moore
- Most reigns: Corporal Robinson (2)
- Longest reign: Necro Butcher (166 days)
- Shortest reign: Dysfunction (<1 day)

The IWA Mid-South Deathmatch Championship was a title in the Independent Wrestling Association Mid-South based in Louisville, Kentucky. The title appeared from 2007, when Drake Younger won a six-person Hardcore Rumble to become the first ever champion. Devon Moore was the final champion. He defeated Danny Havoc in the finals of the 2008 King of the Deathmatch after Corporal Robinson failed to show up for a scheduled title defense.

== Title History ==
Wrestler:	Times:	Date:	Place:	Notes:
Drake Younger	1	February 9, 2007	Plainfield, Indiana	Defeated Ian Rotten, Mad Man Pondo, 2 Tuff Tony, Mickie Knuckles and Die Hard Dustin Lee in a Hardcore Rumble
Dysfunction	1	June 23, 2007	Plainfield, Indiana	Took place during the 2007 King of the Death Match Tournament in a Barbed Wire Boards and Barbed Wire Baseball Bat Death Match
Corporal Robinson	1	June 23, 2007	Plainfield, Indiana	Took place during the 2007 King of the Death Match Tournament in a London Bridge Death Match
Tank	1	July 21, 2007	Joliet, Illinois	Fans Bring the Weapons Match
Necro Butcher	1	September 16, 2007	Sellersburg, Indiana	Defeated Tank and Deranged in a Fans Bring The Weapons Match
Danny Havoc	1	March 1, 2008	Joliet, Illinois	Defeated Necro Butcher and Insane Lane in a Fans Bring The Weapons Match
Corporal Robinson	2	May 3, 2008	Indianapolis, Indiana	Stairway to Hell Match
Jesse James vs CM Punk	1	June 21, 2008	Sellersburg, Indiana	Jesse James vs CM punk
