= Drake Wuertz =

American professional wrestler

Drake Younger
- Younger in August 2026

Personal information
- Born: Drake Wuertz; September 10, 1984 (age 42) Indianapolis, Indiana, U.S.
- Spouse: Valerie Wuertz (m. 2011)
- Children: 5

Professional wrestling career
- Ring names: Drake Wuertz; Drake Younger; Miles Clark (Note: Ring name in Juggalo Championship Wrestling); Polarias
- Billed height: 5 ft 9 in (1.75 m)
- Billed weight: 180 lb (82 kg)
- Billed from: Indianapolis, Indiana by way of the R.A.A.G.E Dojo
- Trained by: American Kickboxer; Ian Rotten; Chris Hero; Low Ki
- Debut: August 31, 2001

Drake Wuertz (born September 10, 1984) is an American professional wrestling referee and professional wrestler.

He was a referee in WWE from 2014 to 2021. Before that, he wrestled for a number of major independent promotions under the ring name Drake Younger, including Combat Zone Wrestling (CZW), IWA Mid-South (IWA MS), EVOLVE, Dragon Gate USA (DGUSA), Chikara, and Pro Wrestling Guerrilla (PWG). Known for his deathmatch wrestling style, he retired from professional wrestling in April 2014 but came out of retirement following his release from WWE in 2021. Wuertz filed as a Republican candidate for Florida's state house, district 30. Wuertz lost in the Republican primary in 2022.

== Early life ==
Wuertz was born in Indianapolis on September 10, 1984.

== Professional wrestling career ==
=== Early career (2001–2006) ===
In 2006, Drake, along with fellow Indianapolis natives Scotty Vortekz, Cliff Crunk, xOMGx, Poon-Loc & Diehard joined the R.A.A.G.E. Dojo, training under American Kickboxer, after already debuting for Insanity Pro Wrestling in Indianapolis.

=== Insanity Pro Wrestling (2006–2009) ===
In March 2006, Drake returned to Insanity Pro Wrestling in a losing effort to "Diehard" Dustin Lee. In June 2006 Drake and Dustin Lee went at it once again but this time at IWA Mid-South's King of the Deathmatch tournament. He defeated Dustin Lee in the 1st round in a cage match, but lost in round 2 against JC Bailey in a barefoot thumbtack deathmatch. On January 5, 2008, Drake defeated Carlton Kaz for the IPW Grand Heavyweight Championship (which Younger made into the IPW World Heavyweight Championship, by defending the Grand Title in Germany), making him a two-time champion by also winning the Jr. Heavyweight Championship a few years back. On January 3, 2009, Younger lost his IPW World Heavyweight Championship to Jon Moxley at Animosity 09 in a Dog Collar Match.

=== Combat Zone Wrestling (2006–2014) ===
Drake debuted for Combat Zone Wrestling in July 2006 in the fifth annual Tournament of Death. Drake lasted to the finals but was eliminated by Nick Gage. The following year, he made it to the finals again and defeated Brain Damage to become the TOD 6 Champion. On July 12, 2008, Younger defeated Nick Gage in a "Tangled Web" Deathmatch for the CZW World Heavyweight Championship, making him a dual champion as he also held the CZW Ultraviolent Underground Championship.

On October 11, 2008, Younger gave his CZW Ultraviolent Underground Championship to Danny Havoc at Decision'08.

On January 30, 2010, Drake Younger would lose his CZW World Heavyweight Title belt to B-Boy at High Stakes 4 - Sky's The Limit. On February 13, 2010, at the CZW 11th Anniversary Show Fan Appreciation Deadly Doubleheader Younger would win the afternoon show defeating Drew Blood but would go on to losing at the night show to J.C. Bailey. On April 10, 2010, at Swinging For The Fences, Drake Younger teamed with Eddie Kingston to win the CZW World Tag Team Champions by defeating The Best Around.

On July 10, 2010, Younger and Kingston were stripped of the CZW World Tag Team Championship, after Kingston quit the company. On September 9, 2010, at CZW's "It's Always Bloody In Philadelphia" Drake Younger turned heel when he turned on the Suicide Kings and his friend Scotty Vortekz.

On April 12, 2014, after signing with WWE, Younger made his farewell appearance for CZW, winning the Best of the Best XIII. He is the only competitor to ever win both the Best Of The Best Tournament and the Tournament Of Death.

==== Hall of Fame (2016) ====
On February 13, 2016, Younger returned to CZW and was inducted into their Hall of Fame.

=== Independent Wrestling Association Mid-South (2007–2011) ===
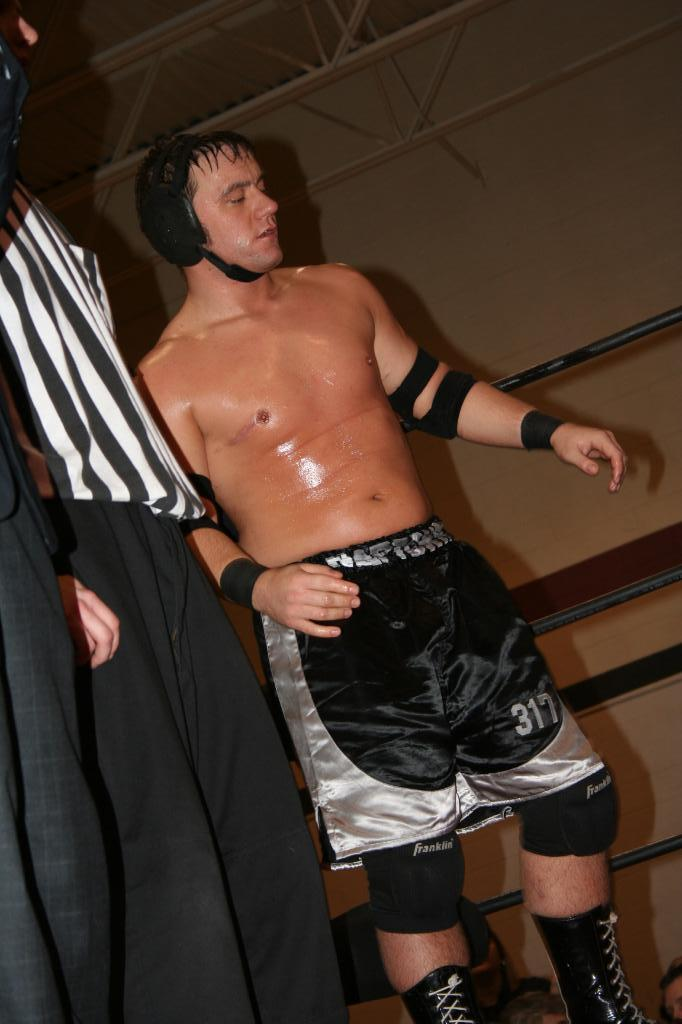
Younger competing in IWA Mid-South

In February 2007, Younger defeated Ian Rotten, Mad Man Pondo, 2 Tuff Tony, Mickie Knuckles and "Diehard" Dustin Lee in a Hardcore Rumble to become the new IWA Mid-South Deathmatch Champion.

On December 1, 2007, Drake Younger competed in the third IWA Deep-South Carnage Cup where he wrestled a Three Way Deathmatch against Viking and WHACKS. In the match WHACKS dropped himself from the ceiling on Drake Younger who lay on a table with light tubes on top of him. The shattering of the light tubes caused a big tear in Drake's left ear due to which he could not finish the tournament. The injury caused him to wear ear protection for the next couple months.

On September 27, 2008, Younger defeated Sami Callihan and Claudio Castagnoli in the finals of the 2008 Ted Petty Invitational, to become the first wrestler to win both a technical wrestling and a deathmatch wrestling tournament.

On September 17, 2011, Drake was crowned IWA Mid South's "King of the Deathmatches". He is the only competitor to ever win both the Ted Petty Invitational and King of the Deathmatches tournaments.

=== Pro Wrestling Guerrilla (2012–2013) ===
Younger made his Pro Wrestling Guerrilla debut on July 21, 2012, at Threemendous III, PWG's nine-year anniversary event. He wrestled and lost against long-time associate B-Boy. Younger returned to PWG in September to compete in his first Battle of Los Angeles tournament, the 2012 Battle of Los Angeles. He was eliminated in the opening round by Roderick Strong on September 1. The next evening, Younger teamed with B-Boy and Willie Mack to defeat Kyle O'Reilly, Davey Richards, and Joey Ryan. On December 1 at Mystery Vortex, Younger wrestled Sami Callihan in a losing effort. After the match, it was announced that Younger and Callihan would participate in a best of three match series to determine a number one contender for the PWG World Championship. At the 2013 Dynamite Duumvirate Tag Team Title Tournament, which took place on January 12, 2013, Younger fought Callihan in a non-tournament knockout or submission-only match. Younger won the bout by knockout, tying the score. On March 22, 2013, Younger defeated Callihan in the third match, a Guerrilla Warfare match, to win the series and become the number one contender to the PWG World Championship. He received his title shot the following day, but was defeated by the defending champion, Adam Cole. In late August, Younger made it to the semifinals of the 2013 Battle of Los Angeles, before losing to eventual tournament winner Kyle O'Reilly.

=== WWE (2013–2021) ===
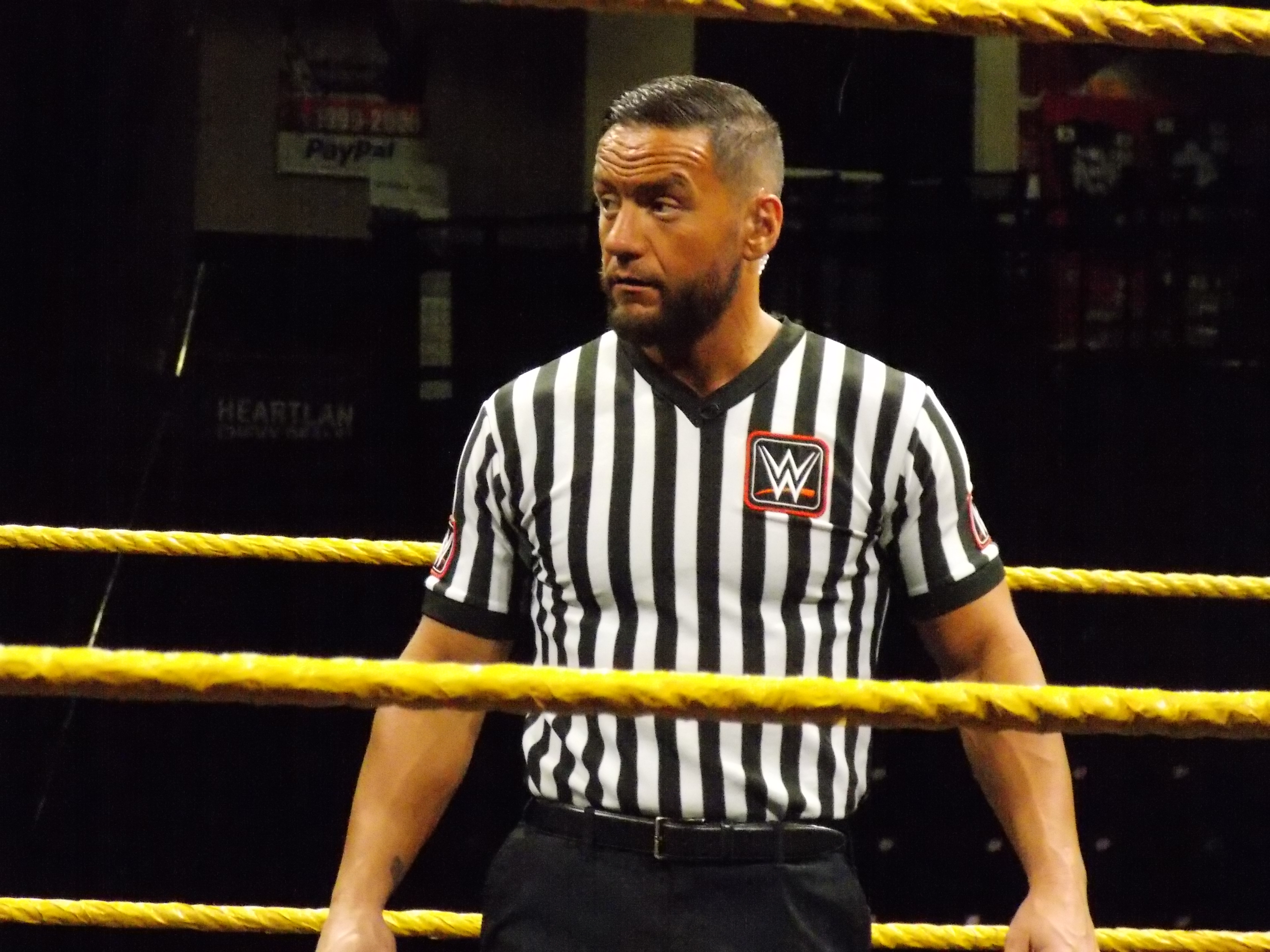
Wuertz in April 2019

On the August 16, 2013 episode of SmackDown, Wuertz appeared in a segment as a backstage worker who was bullied and attacked by Ryback. In December 2013, Wuertz attended a tryout at the WWE Performance Center in Orlando, Florida. In March 2014, it was reported that he had signed a contract with WWE. By May 2014, Wuertz had completed his farewell match on the independent circuit, as well as acknowledged in an interview that he would be working for WWE. Later that month, it was reported that Wuertz had worked as a professional wrestling referee at a house show for WWE's developmental system NXT. Wuertz made his television debut as a referee on the July 10, 2014 episode of NXT, During his time in WWE, he was promoted to the position of head referee in NXT.

On May 19, 2021, it was reported that Wuertz was released from his WWE contract. In the weeks leading up to his release, Wuertz became involved in a series of controversies (in regard to his actions and alleged political beliefs); he was shown to have attended a Zoom meeting of the Seminole County Board of County Commissioners where he made unsubstantiated arguments against mandating mask-wearing. Wuertz also attended a Seminole County Public Schools board meeting, where he argued that mask-wearing in schools assists child predators (in the process missing an NXT taping). Regarding his own views, Wuertz had written on his social media that: "If this is 'Radical' then label me an extremist for Christ". According to Fightful, in the year preceding his release, Wuertz had loudly criticized other wrestlers for receiving vaccinations, and he also stormed out of the 2020 NXT TakeOver: In Your House event after Triple H said that people of all religions were welcome in WWE. Also in 2020, Wuertz used his WWE corporate email to coordinate activities for QAnon-adjacent anti-child trafficking charity Operation Underground Railroad.

=== Post-WWE (2021–present) ===
On May 18, 2023, Wuertz announced his retirement from wrestling. However, he returned on October 15, 2023, for the Circle 6 promotion, defeating Dale Patricks in a deathmatch. On April 22, 2023, Wuertz won the King of the Deathmatch tournament at Xtreme Pro Wrestling's Killafornia 2 pay-per-view at the Derby Room near the Fairplex in Pomona, California.

== Championships and accomplishments ==
- Anarchy Championship Wrestling
  - ACW Tag Team Championship (1 time) – with Ian Rotten
- Absolute Intense Wrestling
  - AIW Absolute Championship (1 time)
- All Pro Wrestling
  - APW Worldwide Internet Championship (1 time)
- Battleground Championship Wrestling
  - Philadelphia Street Fight Championship (1 time, current, inaugural)
- Coliseum Championship Wrestling
  - CCW Tag Team Championship (2 times) – with JC Bailey (1) and Diehard Dustin Lee (1)
- Combat Zone Wrestling
  - CZW Ultraviolent Underground Championship (2 times)
  - Tournament of Death (VI)
  - CZW World Heavyweight Championship (1 time)
  - CZW World Tag Team Championship (1 time) – with Eddie Kingston
  - CZW World Junior Heavyweight Championship (1 time)
  - CZW Best of the Best (2014)
  - Third Triple Crown Champion
  - CZW Hall of Fame (Class of 2016)
- Full Throttle Wrestling
  - FTW Tag Team Championship (1 time) – with Diehard Dustin Lee
- IWA Mid-South
  - IWA Mid-South Deathmatch Championship (1 time)
  - IWA Mid-South King of the Deathmatch (2011)
  - Ted Petty Invitational (2008)
- Insanity Pro Wrestling
  - IPW Grand Championship (1 time)
  - IPW Junior Heavyweight Championship (1 time)
  - IPW World Heavyweight Championship (1 time)
- Mad Pro Wrestling
  - MPW Heavyweight Championship (2 times)
- Pro Wrestling Bushido
  - Pro Wrestling Bushido TV Championship (1 time)
- Pro Wrestling Illustrated
  - PWI ranked him #146 of the 500 best singles wrestlers in the PWI 500 in 2013
- Ruthless Pro Wrestling
  - RPW Rust Belt Championship (1 time)
- Supreme Pro Wrestling
  - SPW Heavyweight Championship (1 time)
- Xtreme Pro Wrestling
  - XPW King of the Deathmatch tournament (2023)
