= JAPW Heavyweight Championship =

Professional wrestling championship

- Last design of the title

Details
- Promotion: Jersey All Pro Wrestling
- Date established: October 31, 1997
- Date retired: February 25, 2018
Statistics
- First champion: Joe Rules
- Final champion: BLK Jeez
- Most reigns: Homicide (7 reigns)
- Longest reign: Blk Jeez (450 days)
- Shortest reign: Joe Rules, Homicide, Lou Diamond, 911 (<1 day)
- Oldest champion: Jerry Lawler (52 years, 344 days)
- Youngest champion: Jay Lethal (20 years, 29 days)
- Heaviest champion: 911 (310 lbs, 141 kg)
- Lightest champion: Low Ki (185 lbs, 82 kg)

The Jersey All Pro Wrestling (JAPW) Heavyweight Championship was a professional wrestling championship in the American independent professional wrestling promotion Jersey All Pro Wrestling. It became an official title on October 31, 1997, when Joe Rules became the first champion. There have been 35 reigns by 19 wrestlers and six vacancies.

== History ==
The first JAPW Heavyweight Champion was Joe Rules and he won the title on October 31, 1997. He would eliminate Pitbull #2 in a 20-man battle royal to become the champion. But later in the evening Pitbull #2 would defeat Joe Rules for the title after duping him into a match.

After unsuccessfully challenging for the title on a number of occasions, Rhino would finally win it. He would finally win it on January 7, 2006. Rhino would defeat all-comers including Teddy Hart who would start a quest for the JAPW Heavyweight Championship. He would unsuccessfully challenge for the title by losing to Rhino. But due to Rhino no-showing an event, he was subsequently stripped of the title. This left the door open for a new champion to be crowned. Then on November 28, 2006, Hart's quest would come to an end when he defeated Low Ki and Necro Butcher in a triple threat match to win the vacant JAPW Heavyweight Championship. Teddy Hart's title reign would come to an end just under three months later when he would be stripped of the title upon release from the company.

Hart's release from the company would again leave the title vacant. The title would remain vacant from January 23, 2007 - March 17, 2007 when Low Ki would win his second JAPW Heavyweight Championship when he defeated Rhino in an eight-man gauntlet match to win the vacant title. Other participants in the match were Chris Hero, Ruckus, Delirious, Davey Richards, EC Negro, Human Tornado.

== Title History ==
=== Names ===
Name	Time of use
JAPW Heavyweight Championship	October 31 – February 25, 2018

=== Reigns ===
Key
No.	Overall reign number
Reign	Reign number for the specific champion
Days	Number of days held

No.	Champion	Championship change			Reign statistics		Notes	Ref.
No.	Champion	Date	Event	Location	Reign	Days	Notes	Ref.
1	Joe Rules	October 31, 1997	Halloween Hell	Bayonne, NJ	1	<1	Last eliminated Pitbull #2 in a 20-man battle royal to become the first champion.	
2	Pitbull #2	October 31, 1997	Halloween Hell	Bayonne, NJ	1	35		
—	Vacated	December 5, 1997	—	Bayonne, NJ	—	—	Title vacated due to Pitbull #2 being injured.	
3	911	December 5, 1997	Night of Barbwire #1	Bayonne, NJ	1	263	Defeated Patch to win the vacant title.	
4	Don Montoya	August 25, 1998	N/A	North Bergen, NJ	1	185		
5	Lou Diamond	February 26, 1999	Valentine's Day Massacre	Bayonne, NJ	1	<1		
6	911	February 26, 1999	Valentine's Day Massacre	Bayonne, NJ	2	<1	Given the title by Diamond after he won it.	
—	Vacated	February 26, 1999	Valentine's Day Massacre	Bayonne, NJ	—	—	Title vacated after Lou Diamond awarded the title to 911.	
7	Lou Diamond	March 12, 1999	N/A	Bayonne, NJ	2	119	Won a 20-man battle royal to win the vacant title.	
8	Homicide	July 9, 1999	Scar Wars '99: The Hardcore Menace	Bayonne, NJ	1	51		
9	Chino Martinez	August 29, 1999	2nd Anniversary Show	Secaucus, NJ	1	61		
10	Lou Diamond	October 29, 1999	Halloween Hell	Bayonne, NJ	3	189		
—	Vacated	May 5, 2000	—	—	—	—	Title stripped for unknown reasons.	
11	Jason	July 14, 2000	N/A	Sayreville, NJ	1	127	Won a 30-man battle royal to win the vacant title.	
—	Vacated	November 18, 2000	3rd Anniversary Show: South Philly Invasion	Philadelphia, PA	—	—	Title vacated after Jason left the promotion.	
12	Homicide	November 18, 2000	3rd Anniversary Show: South Philly Invasion	Philadelphia, PA	2	231	Defeated Jay Lover to win the vacant title.	
13	Low Ki	July 7, 2001	Royal Consequences	Philadelphia, PA	1	42		
14	Homicide	August 18, 2001	The Hit Squads Revenge: The Body Count Continues	Philadelphia, PA	3	168	Three Way match involving Xavier and Low Ki. Due to pre-match stipulations Xavier won the Light Heavyweight Championship.	
15	Dixie	February 2, 2002	Russ Haas Memorial Show	Bayonne, NJ	1	113	Defeated Homicide and Insane Dragon to unify the Heavyweight Championship, New Jersey State Championship and Light Heavyweight Championship.	
16	Homicide	May 26, 2002	Memorial Day Massacre	Seaside Heights, NJ	4	110		
17	Slyck Wagner Brown	September 13, 2002	Never Forget	Bayonne, NJ	1	7		
18	Homicide	September 20, 2002	Family Crisis 2	Bayonne, NJ	5	155		
19	Dan Maff	February 22, 2003	Tough Love	Bayonne, NJ	1	160		
20	Al Snow	August 2, 2003	N/A	Rahway, NJ	1	79		
21	Jerry Lawler	November 8, 2003	6th Anniversary Show	Secaucus, NJ	1	35		
22	Dan Maff	December 13, 2003	Seasons Beatings	Rahway, NJ	2	469	Defeated Lawler and Shane Douglas in a three-way match.	
—	Vacated	March 24, 2005	—	—	—	—	Title vacated after Maff left the promotion.	
23	Homicide	March 26, 2005	Caged Fury	Philadelphia, PA	6	56	Defeated Jay Lethal for the vacant title.	
24	Jay Lethal	May 21, 2005	Braintree Invasion	Braintree, MA	1	231	Defeated Homicide, Kevin Steen and Samoa Joe in a four-way match.	
25	Rhino	January 7, 2006	Wild Card II	Rahway, NJ	1	294		
—	Vacated	October 28, 2006	9th Year Anniversary Show	Rahway, NJ	—	—	Title stripped when Rhino no-shows his title defense.	
26	Teddy Hart	October 28, 2006	9th Year Anniversary Show	Rahway, NJ	1	87	Defeated Low Ki, Homicide, and Necro Butcher to win the vacant title.	
—	Vacated	January 23, 2007	—	—	—	—	Title vacated when Hart was released from the company.	
27	Low Ki	March 17, 2007	Wild Card III	Rahway, NJ	2	224	Defeated Rhino to win an eight man gauntlet for the vacant title. Other participants in the match were Chris Hero, Ruckus, Delirious, Davey Richards, EC Negro, Human Tornado.	
28	Homicide	October 27, 2007	10th Anniversary Show	Rahway, NJ	7	<1		
29	Low Ki	October 27, 2007	10th Anniversary Show	Rahway, NJ	3	133	Pinned Homicide in a tag team match with a stipulation that Homicide loses the title if pinned by anyone.	
30	Kenny Omega	March 8, 2008	Caged Fury 2008	Jersey City, NJ	1	357		
31	Jay Lethal	February 28, 2009	Jersey City Rumble	Jersey City, NJ	2	119		
32	Dan Maff	June 27, 2009	Caged Destiny	Jersey City, NJ	3	511		
33	Brodie Lee	November 20, 2010	November to Remember	Rahway, NJ	1	405	Lee pinned Dan Maff in Championship Scramble, which also included Nick Gage and Azrieal.	
—	Vacated	December 30, 2011	—	—	—	—		
34	Dan Maff	April 14, 2012	14th Anniversary Show	Rahway, NJ	4	212	Maff defeated Low Ki to win the vacant title.	
—	Vacated	November 12, 2012	—	—	—	—		
35	BLK Jeez	November 12, 2016	20th Anniversary Show	Rahway, NJ	1	470	Jeez defeated B-Boy to win the vacant title.	
—	—	February 25, 2018	—	—	—	—	Title retired when promotions closes.	

== Combined reigns ==
Rank	Wrestler	No. of reigns	Combined days
1	Dan Maff	4	1,352
2	Homicide	7	787
3	BLK Jeez	1	470
4	Brodie Lee	1	405
5	Low Ki	3	398
6	Kenny Omega	1	357
7	Jay Lethal	2	350
8	Lou Diamond	3	309
9	Rhino	1	294
10	911	2	264
11	Don Montoya	1	185
12	Jason	1	129
13	Dixie	1	113
14	Al Snow	1	100
15	Teddy Hart	1	87
16	Chino Martinez	1	61
17	Jerry Lawler	1	35
18	Pitbull #2	1	34
19	Slyck Wagner Brown	1	7
20	Joe Rules	1	<1

== See also ==
- JAPW New Jersey State Championship
- JAPW Light Heavyweight Championship
