= CZW Best of the Best =

Professional wrestling tournament

Combat Zone Wrestling's Best of the Best is a professional wrestling tournament and supershow held in the CZW promotion. The annual Best of The Best was originally a junior heavyweight tournament, which in 2005 was repurposed as an all weight tournament.

The first four tournaments saw 12 men first compete in elimination style 3-way matches in the first round before then single elimination matches until a winner was determined. During the 2005 tournament, which was held on May 14, 2005, the winner was determined by all single elimination matches. The original tournament structure returned in 2006, but saw the last four men face off in one match to determine the winner.

== Winners ==
Winner	Date	Location	Best of the Best	Runner-up
Winger	May 19, 2001	Sewell, New Jersey	I	Trent Acid
Trent Acid	June 8, 2002	Philadelphia, Pennsylvania	II	Jody Fleisch
B-Boy	April 12, 2003	Philadelphia, Pennsylvania	III	Sonjay Dutt
Sonjay Dutt	July 10, 2004	Philadelphia, Pennsylvania	IV	Roderick Strong
Mike Quackenbush	May 14, 2005	Philadelphia, Pennsylvania	V	B-Boy, Super Dragon, and Kevin Steen
Ruckus	May 13, 2006	Philadelphia, Pennsylvania	VI	Austin Aries, Claudio Castagnoli, and Sabian
Joker	July 14, 2007	Philadelphia, Pennsylvania	VII	B-Boy
Sabian	May 10, 2008	Philadelphia, Pennsylvania	8	Chuck Taylor
Egotistico Fantastico	June 13, 2009	Philadelphia, Pennsylvania	9	Sami Callihan
Adam Cole	April 9, 2011	Philadelphia, Pennsylvania	X	Sami Callihan
Sami Callihan	April 14, 2012	Voorhees, New Jersey	11	AR Fox
Alex Colon	April 13, 2013	Voorhees, New Jersey	12	AR Fox
Drake Younger	April 12, 2014	Voorhees, New Jersey	XIII	Biff Busick
Mike Bailey	April 11, 2015	Voorhees, New Jersey	14	Jonathan Gresham
Jonathan Gresham	April 9, 2016	Voorhees, New Jersey	15	David Starr
Dave Crist	April 1, 2017	Orlando, Florida	16	Shane Strickland
David Starr	April 18, 2018	Voorhees, New Jersey	17	Zachary Wentz
John Silver	April 13, 2019	Voorhees, New Jersey	18	David Starr
Rich Swann	May 20, 2023	Havre de Grace, Maryland	19	Fred Yehi
Kenta	May 18, 2024	Baltimore, Maryland	XX	Griffin McCoy

== Participants ==
Wrestler	I	II	III	IV	V	VI	VII	8	9	X	11	12	XIII	14	15	16	17	18	19	XX
Aaron Williams														Yes						
ACH											Yes									
Adam Cole										Won										
Alex Kane																			Yes	
Akuma										Yes										
AJ Styles			Yes																	
Alex Colon											Yes	Won								
Alex Reynolds												Yes								
Alex Shelley				Yes																
Amazing Red	Yes																			
Andrew Everett											Yes	Yes	Yes							
Anthony Henry															Yes	Yes				
Anthony Gangone																		Yes		
Anthony Greene																		Yes		
AR Fox										Yes	Yes	Yes	Yes			Yes				
Arik Cannon					Yes															
Austin Aries						Yes														
Azrieal													Yes							
B-Boy		Yes	Won	Yes	Yes	Yes	Yes		Yes									Yes		
Biff Busick												Yes	Yes							
Bobby Quance				Yes																
Brandon Gatson										Yes										
Brando Lee																				Yes
Brandon Kirk																	Yes			
Brandon Thomaselli					Yes		Yes													
Bruce Maxwell								Yes												
Buxx Belmar													Yes	Yes						
Caleb Konley												Yes	Yes	Yes						
Carter Gray									Yes											
Cheech							Yes													
Chris Bosh					Yes															
Chri$ Ca$h			Yes	Yes																
Chris Hero					Yes	Yes														
Christopher Daniels						Yes														
Chuck Taylor						Yes	Yes		Yes	Yes		Yes								
CJP														Yes						
Claudio Castagnoli					Yes	Yes														
Cloudy							Yes													
Curt Robinson															Yes					
Curt Stallion																	Yes			
Daisuke Sekimoto										Yes										
Dave Crist															Yes	Won				
Darius Lockhart																		Yes		
David Starr															Yes	Yes	Won	Yes		
Desean Pratt																			Yes	Yes
Deranged			Yes																	
Derek Frazier					Yes	Yes														
Devon Moore									Yes											
Dezmond Xavier															Yes	Yes				
Drake Younger							Yes	Yes					Won							
Drew Blood									Yes											
Drew Gulak								Yes												
Ebessan					Yes															
Egotistico Fantastico									Won											
Eran Ashe																			Yes	
Ethan Page															Yes					
Excalibur					Yes															
El Generico					Yes															
Fred Yehi																			Yes	
Gabriel		Yes																		
Greg Excellent									Yes		Yes									
Griffin McCoy																			Yes	Yes
Grim Reefer							Yes													
Isiaiah Wolf																			Yes	Yes
Homicide				Yes																
Human Tornado							Yes													
Jack Evans				Yes																
Jaden Newman																			Yes	
Jake Crist										Yes						Yes				
Jason Cade																Yes				
Jason Cross			Yes																	
Jay Briscoe	Yes		Yes																	
Jay Lethal						Yes														
Jigsaw						Yes	Yes													
Jimmy Rave			Yes	Yes														Yes		
Jody Fleisch		Yes																		
Joe Gacy														Yes			Yes			
Joey Lynch																		Yes		
Joel Maximo	Yes																			
Joey Janela														Yes	Yes	Yes	Yes			
John Silver																		Won		
Jonathan Gresham										Yes		Yes		Yes	Won					
Johnny Gargano										Yes	Yes									
Johnny Kashmere		Yes																		
Joker							Won													
Jonny Storm		Yes																		
Jordan Oliver																		Yes		
Jose Maximo	Yes																			
Josh Prohibition								Yes												
Juventud Guerrera	Yes																			
Ken Broadway																			Yes	
Kenny the Bastard					Yes															
Kenta																				Won
Kevin Steen					Yes															
Kidd Bandit																			Yes	
Kyle O'Reilly										Yes										
Lil Cholo			Yes																	
Lince Dorado											Yes									
Lio Rush															Yes	Yes				
Lucky 13													Yes	Yes						
LuFisto								Yes												
M-Dogg 20		Yes																		
Mark Briscoe	Yes																			
Mance Warner																		Yes		
Matt Riddle																	Yes			
Matt Sydal						Yes														
Matt Travis																		Yes		
Maxx Fuery		Yes																		
Michael Elgin																Yes				
Mike Bailey													Yes	Won						
Mike Quackenbush					Won															
Mike Walker																				Yes
Minoru Fujita	Yes																			
MK McKinnan											Yes									
Myles Hawkins																			Yes	Yes
Myron Reed																	Yes	Yes		
Nate Webb				Yes	Yes															
Nick Berk	Yes	Yes																		
Nick Mondo	Yes																			
O'Shay Edwards																		Yes		
Petey Williams				Yes																
Papadon													Yes							
Peter Avalon																	Yes			
Pinkie Sanchez								Yes	Yes											
Rey Fenix																Yes				
Ric Blade	Yes		Yes																	
Rich Swann												Yes					Yes		Won	
Richard Adonis																				Yes
Ricky Reyes							Yes													
Rickey Shane Page															Yes					
Ricochet							Yes	Yes								Yes				
Robert Martyr																				Yes
Roderick Strong				Yes		Yes														
Ruckus			Yes	Yes		Won	Yes													
Ryan McBride									Yes											
Sabian					Yes	Yes		Won	Yes											
Sal Thomaselli							Yes													
Sami Callihan									Yes	Yes	Won									
Sammy Guevara																		Yes		
Samuray del Sol											Yes									
Scorpio Sky																Yes				
Scotty Vortekz							Yes	Yes	Yes											
Shane Hollister												Yes								
Shane Strickland												Yes			Yes	Yes				
Shiima Xion									Yes											
Sonjay Dutt			Yes	Won		Yes														
Spyral BKNY								Yes												
Storm Grayson																				Yes
Stupefied								Yes												
Super Dragon		Yes			Yes															
Tessa Blanchard																	Yes			
Timothy Thatcher													Yes							
TJ Cannon								Yes												
Tommy End												Yes		Yes						
Tony Mamaluke		Yes	Yes																	
Tracy Williams														Yes						
Trent Seven											Yes									
Trent Acid	Yes	Won	Yes																	
Trevor Lee														Yes						
Trey Miguel																	Yes			
Troy Parker																				Yes
Uhaa Nation												Yes								
Vito Thomaselli							Yes													
Willie Mack											Yes									
Wheeler Yuta																	Yes			
Winger	Won																			
Zachary Wentz																Yes	Yes			
Zack Sabre Jr.										Yes										

== Results ==
=== Best of the Best ===
Best of the Best
- Promotion: Combat Zone Wrestling
- Date: May 19, 2001
- City: Sewell, New Jersey
- Venue: Champs Arena

Best of the Best chronology
← Previous; First	Next → Best of the Best III

CZW's first Best of the Best tournament took place on May 19, 2001, at the Champs Soccer Arena in Sewell, New Jersey.

No.	Results	Stipulations	Times
1	Amazing Red and Winger defeated Ric Blade	Best of the Best first round 3-Way match	7:07
2	Mark Briscoe and Jay Briscoe defeated Nick Mondo	Best of the Best first round 3-Way match	9:52
3	Minoru Fujita and Nick Berk defeated Jose Maximo	Best of the Best first round 3-Way match	3:10
4	Trent Acid and Ruckus (Note: Ruckus was a stand in for Juventud Guerrera as he was late to arrive.) defeated Joel Maximo	Best of the Best first round 3-Way match	5:42
5	Ruckus and VD (Eddie Valentine and Jon Dahmer) (with Big Mac Smack) defeated Jeff Rocker and The Rachies (Adam Flash and Danny Rose)	Six-man tag team match	12:49
6	Winger defeated Amazing Red	Best of the Best quarterfinal match	4:34
7	Jay Briscoe defeated Mark Briscoe	Best of the Best quarterfinal match	14:50
8	Minoru Fujita defeated Nick Berk	Best of the Best quarterfinal match	7:11
9	Trent Acid defeated Juventud Guerrera	Best of the Best quarterfinal match	6:17
10	Winger defeated Minoru Fujita	Best of the Best semifinal match	12:31
11	Trent Acid defeated Jay Briscoe	Best of the Best semifinal match	11:57
12	Justice Pain, Lobo, and Wifebeater defeated Nick Mondo and H8 Club (Nate Hatred and Nick Gage)	Six-man tag team match	13:47
13	Winger defeated Trent Acid	Best of the Best final match	11:32

=== Best of the Best II ===
Best of the Best II
- Promotion: Combat Zone Wrestling
- Date: June 8, 2002
- City: Philadelphia, Pennsylvania
- Venue: Viking Hall

Best of the Best chronology
← Previous; Best of the Best	Next → Best of the Best III

CZW's second Best of the Best tournament took place on June 8, 2002, at the “CZW Arena” (Viking Hall) in Philadelphia, Pennsylvania.

No.	Results	Stipulations	Times
1	Trent Acid and M-Dogg 20 defeated Gabriel	Best of the Best II first round 3-Way match	6:06
2	Super Dragon and B-Boy defeated Nick Berk	Best of the Best II first round 3-Way match	7:59
3	Ruckus and Tony Mamaluke defeated Maxx Fuery	Best of the Best II first round 3-Way match	6:03
4	Jody Fleisch and Jonny Storm defeated Johnny Kashmere	Best of the Best II first round 3-Way match	4:43
5	Justice Pain won	19-man battle royal to determine the #1 contender for the CZW Iron Man Championship	16:11
6	Trent Acid defeated M-Dogg 20	Best of the Best II quarterfinal match	20:01
7	B-Boy defeated Super Dragon	Best of the Best II quarterfinal match	15:12
8	Ruckus defeated Tony Mamaluke	Best of the Best II quarterfinal match	11:32
9	Jody Fleisch defeated Jonny Storm	Best of the Best II quarterfinal match	12:20
10	Lobo vs. Wifebeater ended in a no-contest	Barbwire boards match	0:00
11	Trent Acid defeated B-Boy	Best of the Best II semifinal match	6:53
12	Jody Fleisch defeated Ruckus	Best of the Best II semifinal match	6:49
13	Justice Pain defeated Nick Mondo (c) and The Messiah (c) (Note: Mondo was the Iron Man Champion and the Messiah was the World Heavyweight Champion)	Three way match for the CZW Iron Man Championship and CZW World Heavyweight Championship with Adam Flash as special guest referee	13:37
14	Trent Acid defeated Jody Fleisch	Best of the Best II final match	9:27
(c) / – the champion(s) heading into the match

=== Best of the Best III ===
Best of the Best III
- Promotion: Combat Zone Wrestling
- Date: April 12, 2003
- City: Philadelphia, Pennsylvania
- Venue: Viking Hall

Best of the Best chronology
← Previous; Best of the Best II	Next → Best of the Best IV

CZW's third Best of the Best tournament took place on April 12, 2003, at the “CZW Arena” (Viking Hall) in Philadelphia, Pennsylvania. Due to the show starting late, all the matches had a strict 15 minute time limit.

No.	Results	Stipulations	Times
1	Ruckus and Sonjay Dutt defeated Chri$ Ca$h	Best of the Best III first round 3-Way match	10:06
2	Ric Blade and Trent Acid defeated Tony Mamaluke	Best of the Best III first round 3-Way match	8:22
3	B-Boy and Lil Cholo defeated Deranged	Best of the Best III first round 3-Way match	8:50
4	Jimmy Rave and Jay Briscoe defeated AJ Styles and Jason Cross	Best of the Best III first round 4-Way match	7:16
5	Nate Hatred won by last eliminating Tank (Note: Order of elimination: John House, The Hurricane Kid, Salvatore Rinauro, WHACKS, Krystian Wolf, Shane Golden, Jude, Rick Feinberg, The Towel Boy, Niles Young, Cory Kastle, Nick Gage, The Messiah, GQ, Johnny Kashmere, Chris Stylz, Nick Berk, Ian Knoxx, Z-Barr, Derek Frazier, Rockin' Rebel, Zandig, Danny Rose, Jon Dahmer, Tank)	29-man Title Shot of Your Choice battle royal	30:41
6	Sonjay Dutt defeated Mark Briscoe to advance (Note: Briscoe subbed for Ruckus.)	Best of the Best III quarterfinal match	8:40
7	Trent Acid defeated Ric Blade to advance	Best of the Best III quarterfinal match	10:43
8	B-Boy defeated Lil Cholo to advance	Best of the Best III quarterfinal match	8:53
9	Jay Briscoe defeated Jimmy Rave to advance	Best of the Best III quarterfinal match	8:42
10	Sonjay Dutt defeated Trent Acid to advance	Best of the Best III semifinal match	6:39
11	B-Boy defeated Jay Briscoe to advance	Best of the Best III semifinal match	10:27
12	The Messiah (c) defeated Nick Gage	Singles match for the CZW World Heavyweight Championship	11:57
13	B-Boy defeated Sonjay Dutt	Best of the Best III final match	11:12
(c) / – the champion(s) heading into the match

=== Best of the Best IV ===
Best of the Best IV
- Promotion: Combat Zone Wrestling
- Date: July 10, 2004
- City: Philadelphia, Pennsylvania
- Venue: New Alhambra Sports & Entertainment Center
- Attendance: 750

Best of the Best chronology
← Previous; Best of the Best III	Next → Best of the Best V

CZW's fourth Best of the Best tournament took place on July 10, 2004, at the “CZW Arena” (New Alhambra Sports & Entertainment Center) in Philadelphia, Pennsylvania.

No.	Results	Stipulations	Times
1	Homicide and Jack Evans defeated Chri$ Ca$h	Best of the Best IV first round 3-Way match	3:50
2	B-Boy and Roderick Strong defeated Jimmy Rave	Best of the Best IV first round 3-Way match	9:48
3	Alex Shelley and Bobby Quance defeated Ruckus (with Maven Bentley, Robby Mireno, and Sabian) via countout to advance	Best of the Best IV first round 3-Way match	7:54
4	Petey Williams and Sonjay Dutt defeated Nate Webb	Best of the Best IV first round 3-Way match	9:16
5	Chris Hero defeated Hotstuff Hernandez	Xtreme Strong Style Tournament first round match	12:04
6	Homicide defeated Jack Evans	Best of the Best IV quarterfinal match	8:28
7	Roderick Strong defeated B-Boy	Best of the Best IV quarterfinal match	12:24
8	Bobby Quance defeated Alex Shelley	Best of the Best IV quarterfinal match	9:19
9	Sonjay Dutt defeated Petey Williams	Best of the Best IV quarterfinal match	16:08
10	Dan Maff defeated Nick Gage	Xtreme Strong Style Tournament first round match	12:33
11	Roderick Strong defeated Homicide	Best of the Best IV semifinal match	12:15
12	Sonjay Dutt defeated Bobby Quance	Best of the Best IV semifinal match	6:34
13	Jimmy Rave defeated Chri$ Ca$h, Nate Webb, and Ruckus (with Maven Bentley, Robby Mireno, and Sabian)	4-Way match	9:37
14	Sonjay Dutt defeated Roderick Strong	Best of the Best IV final match	16:29

=== Best of the Best V: I Can Feel It in the Air Tonight ===
Best of the Best V: I Can Feel It in the Air Tonight
- Promotion: Combat Zone Wrestling
- Date: May 14, 2005
- City: Philadelphia, Pennsylvania
- Venue: New Alhambra Sports & Entertainment Center
- Attendance: 750

Best of the Best chronology
← Previous; Best of the Best IV	Next → Best of the Best VI

CZW's fifth Best of the Best tournament took place on May 14, 2005, at the “CZW Arena” (The Arena) in Philadelphia, Pennsylvania. This was the first Best of the Best tournament to allow heavyweight wrestlers to compete. Also, this Best of the Best tournament did not have the traditional 3-way elimination opening round match. Instead, the final match was a 4-way elimination match.

No.	Results	Stipulations	Times
1	Super Dragon defeated Chris Bosh	Best of the Best V quarterfinal match	9:04
2	El Generico defeated Excalibur	Best of the Best V quarterfinal match	7:46
3	Chris Hero defeated Brandon Thomaselli	Best of the Best V quarterfinal match	9:36
4	Kevin Steen defeated Kenny the Bastard	Best of the Best V quarterfinal match	7:49
5	Mike Quackenbush defeated Arik Cannon	Best of the Best V quarterfinal match	10:04
6	Claudio Castagnoli defeated Derek Frazier	Best of the Best V quarterfinal match	9:01
7	B-Boy defeated Sabian	Best of the Best V quarterfinal match	10:43
8	Ebessan defeated Nate Webb	Best of the Best V quarterfinal match	10:58
9	Super Dragon defeated El Generico	Best of the Best V semifinal match	14:39
10	Kevin Steen defeated Chris Hero	Best of the Best V semifinal match	13:11
11	Mike Quackenbush defeated Claudio Castagnoli	Best of the Best V semifinal match	14:14
12	B-Boy defeated Ebessan to advance	Best of the Best V semifinal match	8:10
13	H8 Club (Justice Pain and Nick Gage) (c) defeated D. J. Hyde and Toby Klein	Tag team match for the CZW World Tag Team Championship	15:13
14	Nate Webb and SeXXXy Eddy defeated BLKOUT (Eddie Kingston and Ruckus) (with Robby Mireno)	Tag team match	18:31
15	Mike Quackenbush defeated B-Boy, Kevin Steen, and Super Dragon	Best of the Best V 4-Way final match	25:50
(c) / – the champion(s) heading into the match

=== Best of the Best VI: CZW vs. ROH ===
Best of the Best VI: CZW vs. ROH
- Promotion: Combat Zone Wrestling
- Date: May 13, 2006
- City: Philadelphia, Pennsylvania
- Venue: New Alhambra Arena
- Attendance: 500

Best of the Best chronology
← Previous; Best of the Best V	Next → Best of the Best VII

CZW's sixth Best of the Best tournament took place on May 13, 2006, at the “CZW Arena” (New Alhambra Arena) in Philadelphia, Pennsylvania. This Best of the Best tournament saw the return of 3-way elimination match for the opening rounds, as well as keeping 4-way elimination match for the final match.

No.	Results	Stipulations	Times
1	Austin Aries and B-Boy defeated Jigsaw	Best of the Best VI quarterfinal 3-Way match	5:38
2	Roderick Strong and Claudio Castagnoli defeated Jay Lethal	Best of the Best VI quarterfinal 3-Way match	8:58
3	Sabian and Matt Sydal defeated Sonjay Dutt	Best of the Best VI quarterfinal 3-Way match	4:59
4	Christopher Daniels and Ruckus (c) defeated Derek Frazier to advance (Note: Daniels pinned Frazier to win the CZW World Heavyweight Championship, but said he didn't want to win the title that way.)	Best of the Best VI quarterfinal Three Way for the CZW World Heavyweight Championship	9:11
5	Team AnDrew (Andy Sumner and Drew Gulak) defeated Pelle Primeau and Rhett Titus	Tag team match	8:08
6	Up in Smoke (Cheech and Cloudy) defeated Ravage and The Heretic	Tag tea match	10:11
7	Austin Aries defeated B-Boy to advance	Best of the Best VI semifinal match	11:57
8	Claudio Castagnoli defeated Roderick Strong to advance	Best of the Best VI semifinal match	12:08
9	Sabian defeated Matt Sydal to advance	Best of the Best VI semifinal match	11:16
10	Ruckus (c) defeated Christopher Daniels to advance	Best of the Best VI semifinal for the CZW World Heavyweight Championship	10:21
11	BLKOUT (Eddie Kingston and Joker) (c) defeated Necro Butcher and Super Dragon	Tag team match for the CZW World Tag Team Championship	16:30
12	Niles Young (c) defeated Cloudy	Singles match for the CZW World Junior Heavyweight Championship	4:50
13	H8 Club (Justice Pain and Nick Gage) defeated Christopher Bishop & Lionel Knight	Tag team match	16:10
14	Ruckus (c) defeated Austin Aries, Claudio Castagnoli and Sabian	Best of the Best VI final 4-Way match for the CZW World Heavyweight Championship	24:15
15	Chris Hero defeated Ruckus (c)	Singles match for the CZW World Heavyweight Championship	5:09
(c) / – the champion(s) heading into the match

=== Best of the Best VII ===
Best of the Best VII
- Promotion: Combat Zone Wrestling
- Date: July 14, 2007
- City: Philadelphia, Pennsylvania
- Venue: New Alhambra Arena
- Attendance: 500

Best of the Best chronology
← Previous; Best of the Best VI	Next → Best of the Best 8

Best of the Best 7 took place on July 14, 2007, at the “CZW Arena” (New Alhambra Arena) in Philadelphia, Pennsylvania.

No.	Results	Stipulations
1	Human Tornado defeated Ruckus	Best of the Best VII quarterfinal match
2	Ricochet defeated Chuck Taylor	Best of the Best VII quarterfinal match
3	B-Boy defeated Cheech	Best of the Best VII quarterfinal match
4	Ricky Reyes defeated Sal Thomaselli	Best of the Best VII quarterfinal match
5	Jigsaw defeated Grim Reefer	Best of the Best VII quarterfinal match
6	Brandon Thomaselli defeated Vito Thomaselli	Best of the Best VII quarterfinal match
7	Scotty Vortekz defeated Cloudy	Best of the Best VII quarterfinal match
8	Joker defeated Drake Younger	Best of the Best VII quarterfinal match
9	Ruckus defeated Justice Pain (c)	Singles match for the CZW World Heavyweight Championship
10	Joker defeated Human Tornado, Ricky Reyes, and Scotty Vortekz	Best of the Best VII semifinal Four Corners Elimination match
11	B-Boy defeated Ricochet, Jigsaw and Brandon Thomaselli	Best of the Best VII semifinal Four Corners Elimination match
12	CJ O'Doyle defeated Jon Dahmer	Singles match
13	Team AnDrew (Andy Sumner and Drew Gulak) defeated Javi-Air and Ryan McBride	tag team match
14	Brain Damage, D. J. Hyde, and Mitch Ryder defeated Danny Havoc and The Tough Crazy Bastards (Necro Butcher and Toby Klein)	Six-man tag team match
15	Joker defeated B-Boy	Best of the Best VII final match
(c) / – the champion(s) heading into the match

=== Best of the Best 8 ===
Best of the Best VIII
- Promotion: Combat Zone Wrestling
- Date: May 10, 2008
- City: Philadelphia, Pennsylvania
- Venue: New Alhambra Arena
- Attendance: 500

Best of the Best chronology
← Previous; Best of the Best VII	Next → Best of the Best 9

The eighth Best of the Best took place on May 10, 2008, at the “CZW Arena” (The Arena) in Philadelphia, Pennsylvania, and featured the first female competitor for a Best of the Best tournament in LuFisto.

No.	Results	Stipulations
1	Up In Smoke (Cheech and Cloudy) defeated Beef Wellington and Player Uno	Tag team match
2	LuFisto defeated Josh Prohibition and Scotty Vortekz to advance (Note: LuFisto eliminated both Josh Prohibition and Scotty Vortekz.)	Best of the Best 8 quarterfinal 4-Way Elimination match
3	Drew Gulak defeated Pinkie Sanchez and Spyral BKNY to advance (Note: Pinkie Sanchez eliminated BKNY. Drew Gulak eliminated Sanchez.)	Best of the Best 8 quarterfinal 3-Way Elimination match
4	Sabian defeated Drake Younger, and The Best Around (Bruce Maxwell and TJ Cannon) to advance (Note: The Best Around eliminated Drake Young. Sabian eliminated The Best Around)	Best of the Best 8 quarterfinal 3-Way Elimination match
5	Chuck Taylor defeated Ricochet and Stupefied to advance (Note: Ricochet eliminated Stupefied. Chuck Taylor eliminated Ricochet.)	Best of the Best 8 quarterfinal 3-Way Elimination match
6	Andy Sumner defeated Dustin Lee, Mickie Knuckles, and WHACKS	Ultraviolent Four Way
7	Danny Havoc defeated Nicky Benz	Tables match
8	Chuck Taylor defeated LuFisto to advance	Best of the Best 8 semifinal match
9	Sabian defeated Drew Gulak to advance	Best of the Best 8 semifinal match
10	Brodie Lee defeated Greg Excellent (with Kylie Pierce)	Hardcore match
11	Nick Gage (c) defeated D. J. Hyde	Singles match for the CZW World Heavyweight Championship
12	Sabian defeated Chuck Taylor	Best of the Best 8 final match
13	Chuck Taylor defeated Sabian (c)	Singles match for the CZW World Junior Heavyweight Championship
(c) / – the champion(s) heading into the match

=== Best of the Best 9 ===
Best of the Best VII
- Promotion: Combat Zone Wrestling
- Date: June 13, 2009
- City: Philadelphia, Pennsylvania
- Venue: The Arena

Best of the Best chronology
← Previous; Best of the Best 8	Next → Best of the Best X

Best of the Best 9 took place on June 13, 2009, at the “CZW Arena” (The Arena) in Philadelphia, Pennsylvania.

No.	Results	Stipulations
1	Ryan McBride defeated B-Boy	Best of the Best 9 quarterfinal match
2	Carter Gray defeated Scotty Vortekz	Best of the Best 9 quarterfinal match
3	Sami Callihan (c) defeated Greg Excellent	Best of the Best 9 quarterfinal match for the CZW Iron Man Championship
4	Devon Moore defeated Pinkie Sanchez	Best of the Best 9 quarterfinal match
5	Shiima Xion defeated Sabian	Best of the Best 9 quarterfinal match
6	Egotistico Fantastico defeated Drew Blood	Best of the Best 9 quarterfinal match
7	Sami Callihan (c) defeated Carter Gray and Ryan McBride	Best of the Best 9 semifinal Three Way for the CZW Iron Man Championship
8	Egotistico Fantastico defeated Devon Moore and Shiima Xion	Best of the Best 9 semifinal Three Way match
9	Rich Swann defeated Chris Halo	Singles matches
10	D. J. Hyde defeated Danny Havoc, Jon Moxley, and Thumbtack Jack	Four Way Bring Your Weapon match
11	Drake Younger (c) defeated Trent Acid	Singles match for the CZW World Heavyweight Championship
12	Egotistico Fantastico defeated Sami Callihan (c)	Best of the Best 9 final match for the CZW Iron Man Championship
(c) / – the champion(s) heading into the match

=== Best of the Best X ===
Best of the Best X
- Promotion: Combat Zone Wrestling
- Date: April 9, 2011
- City: Philadelphia, Pennsylvania
- Venue: Asylum Arena

Best of the Best chronology
← Previous; Best of the Best 9	Next → Best of the Best 11

The tenth Best of the Best took place on April 9, 2011, at the Asylum Arena in Philadelphia, Pennsylvania.

No.	Results	Stipulations	Times
1	Zack Sabre Jr. defeated Jonathan Gresham and Akuma (with Kimber Lee) (Note: Jonathan Gresham eliminated Akum at 6:44. Zack Sabre Jr. eliminated Gresham at 9:43.)	Best of the Best X quarterfinal 3-Way Elimination match	9:43
2	Adam Cole (with Mia Yim) defeated Johnny Gargano and Kyle O'Reilly (Note: Kyle O'Reilly eliminated Johnny Gargano at 8:30. Adam Cole eliminated Kyle O'Reilly at 10:59.)	Best of the Best X quarterfinal 3-Way Elimination match	10:59
3	Daisuke Sekimoto defeated Chuck Taylor (with Larry Dallas) and Brandon Gatson (Note: Daisuke Sekimoto eliminated Brandon Gatson at 5:49 then eliminated Chuck Taylor at 7:56.)	Best of the Best X quarterfinal 3-Way Elimination match	7:56
4	Sami Callihan defeated AR Fox and Jake Crist (Note: Sami Callihan eliminated Jake Crist at 6:28 then eliminated AR Fox at 8:15.)	Best of the Best X quarterfinal 3-Way Elimination match	8:15
5	Devon Moore and The Briscoes (Jay Briscoe and Mark Briscoe) (c) defeated Robert Anthony (c) and Philly's Most Wanted (BLK Jeez and Joker) (with Jon Moxley) (Note: Devin Moore pinned Robert Anthony to become the CZW World Heavyweight Championship.)	Six-man tag team match for the CZW World Heavyweight Championship and CZW World Tag Team Championship	19:46
6	Adam Cole (with Mia Yim) defeated Zack Sabre Jr.	Best of the Best X semifinal match	11:21
7	Sami Callihan defeated Daisuke Sekimoto	Best of the Best X semifinal match	11:20
8	Danny Havoc defeated Jun Kasai (c)	Ragnarok 'n Roll Glass Crush Death Match for the CZW Ultraviolent Underground Championship	18:12
9	Adam Cole (with Mia Yim) (c) defeated Sami Callihan	Best of the Best X final match for the CZW World Junior Heavyweight Championship	14:36
(c) / – the champion(s) heading into the match

=== Best of the Best 11 ===
Best of the Best 11
- Promotion: Combat Zone Wrestling
- Date: April 14, 2012
- City: Voorhees, New Jersey
- Venue: Flyer's Skate Zone

Best of the Best chronology
← Previous; Best of the Best X	Next → Best of the Best 12

Was held on April 14, 2012, at the Flyer's Skate Zone in Voorhees, New Jersey. In addition to the non-tournament matches, Drew Gulak and Danny Havoc signed a contract for a No Ropes Barbwire match that took place on May 12.

No.	Results	Stipulations	Times
1^{D}	Adam Cole defeated Tony Nese (with D. J. Hyde)	Singles match	—
2	Sami Callihan defeated Drake Younger, MK McKinnan, and Trent Seven (Note: Drake Younger and MK McKinnan were both eliminated via count out at 12:10. Sami Callihan eliminated Trent Seven at 17:16.)	Best of the Best 11 quarterfinal 4-Way Elimination match	17:16
3	Alex Colon (with Chrissy Rivera) defeated Greg Excellent and Willie Mack (Note: Willie Mack eliminated Greg Excellent 10:27. Alex Colon eliminated Mack.)	Best of the Best 11 quarterfinal 3-Way Elimination match	12:02
4	Samuray del Sol defeated Chuck Taylor and Johnny Gargano (Note: Chuck Taylor eliminated Johnny Gargano at 6:09. Samuray del Sol eliminated Taylor at 6:30.)	Best of the Best 11 quarterfinal 3-Way Elimination match	6:30
5	AR Fox defeated ACH and Lince Dorado (Note: ACH eliminated Lince Dorado at 9:14. AR Fox eliminated ACH at 12:48.)	Best of the Best 11 quarterfinal 3-Way Elimination match	12:48
6	Dave Crist defeated Jake Crist (c)	Singles match for the CZW Wired TV Championship	5:23
7	Sami Callihan defeated Alex Colon	Best of the Best 11 semifinal match	6:15
8	AR Fox defeated Samuray del Sol	Best of the Best 11 semifinal match	10:06
9	Matt Tremont defeated Clint Margera (with D. J. Hyde)	Ultraviolent match	11:15
10	Sami Callihan defeated A. R. Fox	Best of the Best 11 final match	14:49
(c) / – the champion(s) heading into the match; D / – this was a dark match

=== Best of the Best 12 ===
Best of the Best 12
- Promotion: Combat Zone Wrestling
- Date: April 13, 2013
- City: Voorhees, New Jersey
- Venue: Flyer's Skate Zone

Best of the Best chronology
← Previous; Best of the Best 11	Next → Best of the Best XIII

Took place April 13, 2013, at the Flyer's Skate Zone in Voorhees, New Jersey.

No.	Results	Stipulations	Times
1	Jonathan Gresham defeated Biff Busick and Caleb Konley (Note: Biff Busick eliminated Caleb Konely 9:09. Jonathan Gresham eliminated Busick at 12:20.)	Best of the Best 12 quarterfinal 4-Way Elimination match	12:20
2	Tommy End defeated Shane Hollister and Alex Reynolds (Note: Shane Hollister eliminated Alex Reynolds at 7:07. Tommy End eliminated Hollister at 7:30)	Best of the Best 12 quarterfinal 3-Way Elimination match	7:30
3	Alex Colon defeated Shane Strickland and Rich Swann (Note: Alex Colon eliminated Rich Swann at 8:33 then eliminated Shane Strickland at 9:21.)	Best of the Best 12 quarterfinal 3-Way Elimination match	9:21
4	AR Fox defeated Uhaa Nation and Andrew Everett (Note: Uhaa Nation eliminated Andrew Everett at 10:13. AR Fox eliminated Uhaa Nation at 16:43.)	Best of the Best 12 quarterfinal Three Way Elimination match	16:43
5	Ron Mathis defeated Rory Mondo	Fans Bring the Weapon match	7:09
6	D. J. Hyde defeated Michael Dante	Singles match	7:02
7	Alex Colon defeated Jonathan Gresham	Best of the Best 12 semifinal match	11:20
8	AR Fox defeated Tommy End	Best of the Best 12 semifinal match	11:44
9	Adam Cole defeated Sami Callihan	Singles match	16:28
10	Alex Colon defeated AR Fox	Best of the Best 12 final match	10:21

=== Best of the Best XIII ===
Best of the Best XIII
- Promotion: Combat Zone Wrestling
- Date: April 12, 2014
- City: Voorhees, New Jersey
- Venue: Flyer's Skate Zone

Best of the Best chronology
← Previous; Best of the Best 12	Next → Best of the Best 14

The 13th Best of the Best took place on April 12, 2014, at the Flyer's Skate Zone in Voorhees, New Jersey.

No.	Results	Stipulations	Times
1	Chuck Taylor defeated Buxx Belmar and Lucky 13	Best of the Best XIII quarterfinal 3-Way match	6:17
2	Biff Busick defeated Azerial and Caleb Konley	Best of the Best XIII quarterfinal 3-Way match	6:17
3	Drake Younger defeated Papadon and Timothy Thatcher	Best of the Best XIII quarterfinal 3-Way match	9:04
4	AR Fox defeated Andrew Everett and Mike Bailey	Best of the Best XIII quarterfinal 3-Way match	10:45
5	Shane Strickland (c) defeated Devon Moore	Ladder match for the CZW Wired TV Championship	15:30
6	Biff Busick defeated Chuck Taylor	Best of the Best XIII semifinal match	9:58
7	Drake Younger defeated AR Fox	Best of the Best XIII semifinal match	6:56
8	The Juicy Product (David Starr and J. T. Dunn) defeated Ohio Is for Killers (Dave Crist and Jake Crist)	Tag team match to determine the #1 contender for the CZW World Tag Team Championship	8:25
9	Drake Younger defeated Biff Busick	Best of the Best XIII final match	13:59
(c) / – the champion(s) heading into the match

=== Best of the Best 14 ===
Best of the Best 14
- Promotion: Combat Zone Wrestling
- Date: April 11, 2015
- City: Voorhees, New Jersey
- Venue: Flyer's Skate Zone

Best of the Best chronology
← Previous; Best of the Best 13	Next → Best of the Best 15

The 14th Best of the Best took place on April 11, 2015, at the Flyer's Skate Zone in Voorhees, New Jersey. During the event, Nick Gage made his return to CZW after spending four years in prison.

No.	Results	Stipulations	Times
1	Tommy End defeated Aaron Williams and Caleb Konley (Note: Aaron Williams eliminated Caleb Konley at 7:05. Tommy End eliminated Williams at 8:05.)	Best of the Best 14 quarterfinal 3-Way Elimination match	8:05
2	Jonathan Gresham defeated Trevor Lee and Tracy Williams (Note: Trevor Lee eliminated Tracy Williams at 6:05. Jonathan Gresham eliminated Lee at 7:08.)	Best of the Best 14 quarterfinal 3-Way Elimination match	7:08
3	CJP defeated Joe Gacy (with Tim Donst) and Joey Janela (Note: Joe Gacy eliminated Joey Janela at 5:54. CJP eliminated Gacy at 8:08)	Best of the Best 14 quarterfinal 3-Way Elimination match	8:08
4	Mike Bailey defeated Andrew Everett and Buxx Belmar	Best of the Best 14 quarterfinal 3-Way Elimination match (Note: Andrew Everett eliminated Buxx Belmar at 9:00. Mike Bailey defeated Everett at 9:06.)	9:06
5	Devon Moore defeated Conor Claxton	Conor Claxton's Death Match Trial Series Ultraviolent Scaffold Death Match	13:44
6	Jonathan Gresham defeated Tommy End	Best of the Best 14 semifinal match	13:34
7	Mike Bailey defeated CJP	Best of the Best 14 semifinal match	13:37
8	The Nation Of Intoxication (Danny Havoc and Lucky 13) defeated Ohio Is for Killers (Dave Crist and Jake Crist) (c) via disqualification	Tag team match for the CZW World Tag Team Championship	12:06
9	Mike Bailey defeated Jonathan Gresham	Best of the Best 14 final match	16:58
(c) / – the champion(s) heading into the match

=== Best of the Best 15 ===
Best of the Best 15
- Promotion: Combat Zone Wrestling
- Date: April 9, 2016
- City: Voorhees, New Jersey
- Venue: Flyer's Skate Zone

Best of the Best chronology
← Previous; Best of the Best 14	Next → Best of the Best 16

The 15th Best of the Best took place on April 9, 2016, at the Flyer's Skate Zone in Voorhees, New Jersey.

No.	Results	Stipulations	Times
1	Rickey Shane Page defeated Ethan Page and Ryan Galeone (with Veda Scott)	Best of the Best 15 quarterfinal 3-Way match	6:01
2	Jonathan Gresham defeated Joey Janela and Lio Rush	Best of the Best 15 quarterfinal 3-Way match	0:55
3	Shane Strickland defeated Anthony Henry and Curt Robinson	Three Way Elimination match	11:54
4	David Starr defeated Dave Crist and Dezmond Xavier	Best of the Best 15 quarterfinal 3-May match	7:22
5	Brittany Blake defeated Aaron Williams, Chip Day, Ethan Case, Jason Cade, and Tony Nese	Six Way Scramble match	12:38
6	Jonathan Gresham defeated Rickey Shane Page	Best of the Best 15 semifinal match	8:49
7	David Starr defeated Shane Strickland	Best of the Best 15 semifinal match	9:54
8	The Amazing Gulaks (Drew Gulak and Rory Gulak) defeated Conor Claxton and Devon Moore	Tag team match	12:00
9	Tim Donst defeated Danny Havoc	No Disqualification match	8:23
10	Jonathan Gresham defeated David Starr	Best of the Best 15 final match	26:53

=== Best of the Best 16 ===
Best of the Best 16
- Promotion: Combat Zone Wrestling
- Date: April 1, 2017
- City: Orlando, Florida
- Venue: Wyndham Orlando Resort
- Attendance: 400

Best of the Best chronology
← Previous; Best of the Best 16	Next → Best of the Best 17

The 16th Best of the Best took place on April 1, 2017, in Orlando, Florida

No.	Results	Stipulations	Times
1	Shane Strickland defeated Joey Janela, Lio Rush, and Dezmond Xavier	Best of the Best 16 quarterfinal 4-Way match	7:14
2	AR Fox defeated David Starr, Ricochet, and Jason Cade (with Veda Scott)	Best of the Best 16 quarterfinal 4-Way match	7:16
3	Michael Elgin defeated Anthony Henry (with Amber Young), Scorpio Sky, and Zachary Wentz	Best of the Best 16 quarterfinal 4-Way match	9:00
4	Dave Crist (with JT Davidson) defeated Sami Callihan, Jake Crist, and Rey Fenix	Best of the Best 16 quarterfinal 4-Way match	6:12
5	Joe Gacy (c) defeated Brian Cage	Singles match for the CZW World Heavyweight Championship	9:30
6	Rickey Shane Page defeated Ace Austin, Alexander James, Caleb Konley, Ethan Case, Flip Gordon, Mascarita Dorada, and Tony Deppen	Ultimate Opportunity 8-Way match	9:39
7	Dave Crist (with JT Davidson) defeated Michael Elgin	Best of the Best 16 semifinal match	11:05
8	Shane Strickland defeated AR Fox	Best of the Best 16 semifinal match	10:55
9	Father Matthew Tremont (with Stockade) defeated Penta el Zero M	Deathmatch with Kevin Sullivan as special guest referee	13:44
10	Dave Crist defeated Shane Strickland	Best of the Best 16 final match	14:53
(c) / – the champion(s) heading into the match

=== Best of the Best 17 ===
Best of the Best 17
- Promotion: Combat Zone Wrestling
- Date: April 14, 2018
- City: Voorhees, New Jersey
- Venue: The Coliseum
- Attendance: 400

Best of the Best chronology
← Previous; Best of the Best 16	Next → Best of the Best 18

The 17th Best of the Best took place on April 14, 2018, at The Coliseum in Voorhees, New Jersey.

No.	Results	Stipulations
1	Matt Riddle defeated Wheeler Yuta and Curt Stallion	Best of the Best 17 quarterfinal 3-Way match
2	Zachary Wentz defeated Myron Reed and Trey Miguel	Best of the Best 17 quarterfinal 3-Way match
3	David Starr and Tessa Blanchard defeated Peter Avalon	Best of the Best 17 quarterfinal 3-Way match
4	Joe Gacy defeated Brandon Kirk, Joey Janela, and Rich Swann	Best of the Best 17 quarterfinal 4-Way match
5	Zachary Wentz defeated Joe Gacy (with Blackwater)	Best of the Best 17 semifinal match
6	David Starr defeated Tessa Blanchard and Matt Riddle	Best of the Best 17 semifinal 3-Way match
7	The REP (Dave McCall and Nate Carter) (with Maven Bentley) (c) defeated The Storm Of Entrails (Dan O'Hare and SHLAK)	Tag team match for the CZW World Tag Team Championship
8	Maxwell Jacob Friedman defeated Rickey Shane Page (c)	Singles match for the CZW World Heavyweight Championship
9	David Starr defeated Zachary Wentz	Best of the Best 17 final match
(c) / – the champion(s) heading into the match

=== Best of the Best 18 ===
Best of the Best 18
- Promotion: Combat Zone Wrestling
- Date: April 13, 2019
- City: Voorhees, New Jersey
- Venue: Colossal Sports Academy

Best of the Best chronology
← Previous; Best of the Best 17	Next → Best of the Best 19

The 18th Best of the Best took place on April 13, 2019, at Colossal Sports Academy in Voorhees, New Jersey.

No.	Results	Stipulations
1	Anthony Greene defeated B-Boy, Anthony Gangone, and Mance Warner (c)	Best of the Best 18 quarterfinal 4-Way match for the CZW World Heavyweight Championship
2	David Starr defeated Darius Lockhart, Joey Lynch, and Jimmy Rave	Best of the Best 18 quarterfinal 4-Way match
3	John Silver defeated Gary Jay, Kris Statlander (WSU Spirit (c)), and Fred Yehi	Best of the Best 18 quarterfinal 4-Way match
4	Jordan Oliver defeated Matt Travis and Myron Reed and Sammy Guevara	Best of the Best 18 quarterfinal 4-Way match
5	David Starr defeated Anthony Greene (c)	Best of the Best 18 semifinal match for the CZW World Heavyweight Championship
6	John Silver defeated Jordan Oliver	Best of the Best 18 semifinal match
7	Leyla Hirsch defeated Shazza McKenzie	Women's singles match
8	Young Dumb N Broke (Charlie Tiger and Ellis Taylor) (with Griffin McCoy and Valentina Vazquez) defeated IFHY (Johnathan Wolf and Shawn Kemp)	Tag Team match
9	John Silver defeated David Starr (c)	Best of the Best 18 final match for the CZW World Heavyweight Championship
(c) / – the champion(s) heading into the match

=== Best of the Best 19 ===
Best of the Best 19
- Promotion: Combat Zone Wrestling
- Date: May 20, 2023
- City: Havre de Grace, Maryland
- Venue: State Theater

Best of the Best chronology
← Previous; Best of the Best 18	Next → Best of the Best XX

The 19th Best of the Best took place on May 20, 2023, at State Theater in Havre de Grace, Maryland.

No.	Results	Stipulations
1	O'Shay Edwards defeated Alex Kane and Eran Ashe	Best of the Best 19 first round 3-Way match
2	Rich Swann defeated Kidd Bandit and Myles Hawkins	Best of the Best 19 first round 3-Way match
3	Fred Yehi defeated Isaiah Wolf and Jaden Newman	Best of the Best 19 first round 3-Way match
4	Griffin McCoy defeated Ken Broadway and Myron Reed	Best of the Best 19 first round 3-Way match
5	Rich Swann defeated Desean Pratt and O'Shay Edwards	Best of the Best 19 semifinal 3-Way match
6	Fred Yehi defeated Griffin McCoy	Best of the Best 19 semifinal match
7	The REP (Dave McCall and Nate Carter) defeated EN Bush and Matt Quay	Tag team match
8	Team Post Game (Brando Lee, Kris Bishop, Mike Walker, Ruthless Lala and Vinny Talotta) defeated Team Milk Chocolate (Brandon Watts, JC Storm, Randy Summers, Richard King and Troy Parker)	Eight-man tag team match
9	Rich Swann defeated Fred Yehi	Best of the Best 19 final match for the vacant CZW World Heavyweight Championship

=== Best of the Best XX ===
Best of the Best XX
- Promotion: Combat Zone Wrestling
- Date: May 18, 2024
- City: Baltimore, Maryland
- Venue: Power Plant Live!

Best of the Best chronology
← Previous; Best of the Best 19	Next → —

The 20th Best of the Best took place on May 18, 2024, at Power Plant Live! in Baltimore, Maryland.

No.	Results	Stipulations
1	Richard Adonis defeated Brando Lee and Storm Grayson	Best of the Best 19 first round 3-Way match
2	Griffin McCoy defeated Mike Walker and Robert Martyr	Best of the Best 19 first round 3-Way match
3	Desean Pratt defeated Myles Hawkins and Shaun Smith	Best of the Best 19 first round 3-Way match
4	Kenta defeated Isaiah Wolf and Troy Parker	Best of the Best 19 first round 3-Way match
5	Griffin McCoy defeated Richard Adonis	Best of the Best 19 semifinal match
6	Kenta defeated Desean Pratt	Best of the Best 19 semifinal match
7	Kenta defeated Griffin McCoy	Best of the Best 19 final match
