= JAPW New Jersey State Championship =

Professional wrestling championship

Details
- Promotion: Jersey All Pro Wrestling
- Date established: September 28, 1998
- Date retired: January 1, 2012
Statistics
- First champion: Flash Wheeler
- Final champion: Brodie Lee
- Most reigns: Archadia and Grim Reefer (2 times)
- Longest reign: Brodie Lee (589 days)
- Shortest reign: Reckless Youth (32 days)
- Oldest champion: Charlie Haas (37 years, 358 days)
- Heaviest champion: Brodie Lee (275 lb (125 kg))
- Lightest champion: Bandido Jr. (167 lb (76 kg))

The JAPW New Jersey State Championship was a title in the Jersey All Pro Wrestling professional wrestling promotion. It became an official title on September 25, 1998. Flash Wheeler become the first champion in a 20-man battle royal. It was retired on June 7, 2002 and was replaced with the JAPW Television Championship. On September 15, 2006, Frankie Kazarian was declared the New Jersey State Champion after the JAPW Light Heavyweight Championship was retired.

The final champion was Brodie Lee. He won the title on May 22, 2010 at Notorious Thunder in career vs. titles match. The Hillbilly Wrecking Crew (Brodie Lee and Necro Butcher's JAPW careers were on the line while Charlie Haas (JAPW New Jersey State Champion) and Dan Maff (JAPW Heavyweight Champion were on the line. Lee pinned Haas to win the title.

== Title history ==
=== Names ===
Name	Time of use
JAPW New Jersey State Championship	September 25, 1998 – January 1, 2012

=== Reigns ===
Key
No.	Overall reign number
Reign	Reign number for the specific champion
Days	Number of days held

No.	Champion	Championship change			Reign statistics		Notes	Ref.
No.	Champion	Date	Event	Location	Reign	Days	Notes	Ref.
1	Flash Wheeler	September 25, 1998	JAPW Live	Bayonne, New Jersey	1	222	Wheeler won a 20-man battle royal to become the first champion.	
2	Lord Zieg	April 4, 1999	Cage Rage	North Bergen, New Jersey	1	142	This was a Falls Count Anywhere match	
3	Magic	August 29, 1999	2nd Anniversary Show	Secaucus, New Jersey	1	110		
4	Dr. Hurtz	December 17, 1999	Seasons Beatings	Bayonne, New Jersey	1	337	Defeated Magic and Born to Eat in a Three-Way Dance.	
5	Skinhead Ivan	November 18, 2000	South Philly Invasion: 3rd Anniversary Show	Philadelphia, Pennsylvania	1	231	Defeated Dr. Hurtz and Laithon in a Three-Way Dance.	
6	Reckless Youth	July 7, 2001	Royal Consequences	Philadelphia, Pennsylvania	1	29		
—	Vacated	August 5, 2001	—	—	—	—	Title vacated by Reckless Youth due to injury.	
7	Dixie	August 24, 2001	The Aftermath	Bayonne, New Jersey	1	287	Won a 20-man battle royal win the vacant title. At the Russ Haas Memorial Show on February 2, 2002, Dixie defeated Homicide (JAPW Heavyweight Champion and The Insane Dragon (JAPW Light Heavyweight Champion) in a winner take all Three-Way Dance to become the Triple Crown Champion.	
—	Deactivated	June 7, 2002	Smarts Only	Bayonne, New Jersey	—	—	Replaced with the JAPW Television Championship. Ghost Shadow defeated Dixie become the inaugural champion.	
8	Frankie Kazarian	September 15, 2006	Rampage	Rahway, New Jersey	1	183	Kazarian was declared the champion when the JAPW Light Heavyweight Championship was decativated and the New Jersey State Championship was re-activated.	
9	Grim Reefer	March 17, 2007	Wild Card III	Rahway, New Jersey	1	224		
10	Archadia	October 27, 2007	10th Anniversary Show	Rahway, New Jersey	1	175	This was a ladder match.	
11	Grim Reefer	April 19, 2008	Spring Massacre	Rahway, New Jersey	2	210	Defeated Archadia, Azrieal, and Eddie Kingston in a Four-way match.	
12	Bandido Jr.	November 15, 2008	Reboot	Jersey City, New Jersey	1	105		
13	Eddie Kingston	February 28, 2009	Jersey City Rumble	Jersey City, New Jersey	1	70		
14	Archadia	May 9, 2009	Holy Ouch 2	Rahway, New Jersey	2	259		
15	Devon Moore	January 23, 2010	12th Anniversary Show	Rahway, New Jersey	1	56	Was a dark match.	
16	Charlie Haas	March 20, 2010	Wild Card 6	Rahway, New Jersey	1	63	Was a dark match.	
17	Brodie Lee	May 22, 2010	Notorious Thunder	Rahway, New Jersey	1	589	The Hillbilly Wreck Crew (Brodie Lee and Necro Butcher) defeated Charlie Haas and Dan Maff in a Double Jeopardy match. The Hillbilly Wrecking Crew's JAPW careers and JAPW New Jersey State Championship and the JAPW Heavyweight Championship were both on the line vs. Lee pinned Haas to win the title.	
—	—	January 1, 2012	—	—	—	—		

== Combined reigns ==
Rank	Wrestler	No. of reigns	Combined days
1	Brodie Lee	1	589
2	Archadia	2	434
3	Grim Reefer	2	393
4	Dr. Hurtz	1	337
5	Dixie	1	287
6	Skinhead Ivan	1	231
7	Flash Wheeler	1	196
8	Frankie Kazarian	1	183
9	Lord Zieg	1	172
10	Bandido Jr.	1	105
11	Magic	1	80
12	Eddie Kingston	1	70
13	Charlie Haas	1	63
14	Devon Moore	1	56
15	Reckless Youth	1	29

== See also ==
- Jersey All Pro Wrestling
- JAPW Heavyweight Championship
- JAPW Light Heavyweight Championship
- JAPW Television Championship
