= JAPW Light Heavyweight Championship =

Professional wrestling championship

Details
- Promotion: Jersey All Pro Wrestling
- Date established: December 5, 1997
- Date retired: February 25, 2018
Statistics
- First champion: Rik Rachet
- Final champion: Archadia
- Most reigns: Azrieal (4 reigns)
- Longest reign: Kenny Omega (1280 days)
- Shortest reign: Nick Berk (21 days)

The JAPW Light Heavyweight Championship was a professional wrestling championship in the American independent professional wrestling promotion Jersey All Pro Wrestling. It became official title on December 5, 1997 when Rik Rachet defeated Chino Martinez in a tournament final to crown the first champion. It was retired on September 15, 2006 when the New Jersey State Championship was re-activated. Frankie Kazarian remained champion as a result. Prince Mustafa Ali became the new champion after the title was re-activated.

== Title history ==
There have been a total of twenty-eight reigns shared between twenty-three different wrestlers with eight vacancies. Archadia was the last champion before the title was retired upon the closure of JAPW.

Key
| No. | Overall reign number |
| Reign | Reign number for the specific champion |
| Days | Number of days held |

| No. | Champion | Championship change | | | Reign statistics | | Notes | Ref. |
| No. | Champion | Date | Event | Location | Reign | Days | Notes | Ref. |
|---|---|---|---|---|---|---|---|---|
| 1 | Rik Ratchet | December 5, 1997 | Night of Barbwire #1 | Bayonne, NJ | 1 | 107 | Defeated Chino Martinez in tournament final to become the inaugural champion. | |
| 2 | Chino Martinez | March 22, 1998 | 1st Anniversary Show: Night of Barbwire #2 | Newark, NJ | 1 | 502 | | |
| 3 | O Dogg | August 6, 1999 | N/A | Bayonne, NJ | 1 | 23 | | |
| 4 | Billy Reil | August 29, 1999 | 2nd Anniversary Show | Seacaucus, NJ | 1 | 440 | | |
| — | Vacated | November 11, 2000 | N/A | Bayonne, NJ | — | — | Title was vacated after Reil suffered a legitimate injury. | |
| 5 | Nick Berk | November 18, 2000 | 3rd Anniversary Show: South Philly Invasion | Philadelphia, PA | 1 | 77 | Defeated Trent Acid and Ric Blade in a three-way match to win the vacant title. | |
| 6 | Ric Blade | February 3, 2001 | N/A | Philadelphia, PA | 1 | 133 | | |
| — | Vacated | June 16, 2001 | World War 2001 | Philadelphia, PA | — | — | Title was declared vacant when Blade suffered an injury. | |
| 7 | Nick Berk | June 16, 2001 | World War 2001 | Philadelphia, PA | 2 | 21 | Defeated Chino Martinez and Billy Reil in a three-way match to win the vacant title. | |
| 8 | Low Ki | July 7, 2001 | Royal Consequences | Philadelphia, PA | 1 | 32 | | |
| 9 | Xavier | August 8, 2001 | Last Dance | Philadelphia, PA | 1 | 52 | Awarded title when Low Ki lost a three-way match to Homicide for the Heavyweight Championship of which Xavier was a part. | |
| — | Vacated | September 29, 2001 | Family Crisis | Philadelphia, PA | — | — | Xavier was stripped of the title due to injury. | |
| 10 | Deranged | September 29, 2001 | Family Crisis | Philadelphia, PA | 1 | 69 | Defeated Ghost Shadow to win the vacant title. | |
| 11 | The Insane Dragon | December 7, 2001 | Seasons Beatings Tour Night 2 | Bayonne, NJ | 1 | 57 | | |
| 12 | Dixie | February 2, 2002 | Russ Haas Memorial Show | Bayonne, NJ | 1 | 350 | Defeated Homicide and the Insane Dragon in a three-way match to unify the New Jersey State Championship, Heavyweight, and Light Heavyweight titles. | |
| 13 | Rain | January 18, 2003 | Actions Speak Louder Than Words | Woodbridge, NJ | 1 | 164 | | |
| — | Vacated | July 1, 2003 | N/A | N/A | — | — | Rain vacated the title after retiring from professional wrestling. | |
| 14 | Azrieal | August 2, 2003 | N/A | Rahway, NJ | 1 | 210 | Defeated Monsta Mack and Nick Berk in a three-way match to win the vacant title. | |
| 15 | Jay Lethal | February 28, 2004 | Revolution | Rahway, NJ | 1 | 286 | This was a four-way match also involving The Insane Dragon and Jack Evans. | |
| 16 | Azrieal | December 10, 2004 | N/A | Rahway, NJ | 2 | 176 | | |
| 17 | B-Boy | June 4, 2005 | HomeComing | Rahway, NJ | 1 | (Note: The exact date on which B-Boy was stripped of the title during his only reign is unknown, which means that his reign lasted between 0 and 76 days.) | | |
| — | Vacated | 2005 | N/A | N/A | — | — | B-Boy was stripped off the title for unknown reasons. The length of his reign is uncertain. | |
| 18 | Azrieal | August 19, 2005 | N/A | Rahway, NJ | 3 | 141 | Defeated Bandido, Jr. and Archadia in a three-way match to win the vacant title. | |
| 19 | Teddy Hart | January 7, 2006 | Wild Card II | Rahway, NJ | 1 | 161 | This was a seven-man gauntlet match also involving M-Dogg 20, Quiet Storm, Arcadia, Javi Air and Grim Reefer. | |
| — | Vacated | June 17, 2006 | Caged Fury 2 | Rahway, NJ | — | — | Hart was stripped of the belt when he no-shows the event. | |
| 20 | Frankie Kazarian | June 17, 2006 | Caged Fury 2 | Rahway, NJ | 1 | 90 | Defeated Jay Lethal and A.J. Styles in a three-way match to win the vacant title. | |
| — | Deactivated | September 15, 2006 | Rampage | Rahway, NJ | — | — | The title was retired as the New Jersey State Championship was re-activated. Kazarian remained champion. | |
| 21 | Prince Mustafa Ali | January 24, 2009 | Wild Card V | Rahway, NJ | 1 | 63 | Defeated Flip Kendrick, Louis Lyndon and Amazing Red in a four-way match to win the re-activated title. | |
| 22 | Flip Kendrick | March 28, 2009 | Unfinished Business | Rahway, NJ | 1 | 168 | | |
| 23 | Bandido, Jr. | September 12, 2009 | Basebrawl | Rahway, NJ | 1 | 406 | | |
| 24 | Azrieal | October 23, 2010 | Halloween Hell 2010 | Jersey City, NJ | 4 | 48 | | |
| 25 | Jushin Thunder Liger | December 10, 2010 | 13th Anniversary Show: Night One | Rahway, NJ | 1 | 156 | Defeated Azrieal, Bandido Jr., B-Boy, El Generico and Kenny Omega in a six-way elimination match. | |
| 26 | Kenny Omega | May 15, 2011 | NJPW Invasion Tour 2011 | Philadelphia, PA | 1 | 1,280 | | |
| — | Vacated | November 15, 2014 | N/A | N/A | — | — | Omega vacated the title due to fully signing with New Japan Pro Wrestling. | |
| 27 | Blk Jeez | November 15, 2014 | JAPW 18th Anniversary Show | Rahway, NJ | 1 | 728 | Defeated Marq Quen, Bandido Jr., and Lucky 13 to win the vacant title. | |
| — | Vacated | November 12, 2016 | N/A | N/A | — | — | Title vacated under unknown circumstances. | |
| 28 | Archadia | November 12, 2016 | 20th Anniversary Show | Rahway, NJ | 1 | 470 | Defeated Azrieal, Conor Claxton, Joey Janela, John Silver, J. T. Dunn, Pinkie Sanchez and Steve Scott to win the vacant title. | |
| — | Deactivated | November 12, 2016 | N/A | N/A | — | — | The title was retired upon Jersey All Pro Wrestling's closure. | |

== Combined reigns ==
| ¤ | The exact length of at least one title reign is too uncertain to calculate. |

| Rank | Wrestler | No. of reigns | Combined days |
|---|---|---|---|
| 1 | Kenny Omega | 1 | 1,280 |
| 2 | Blk Jeez | 1 | 728 |
| 3 | Azrieal | 4 | 576 |
| 4 | Chino Martinez | 1 | 502 |
| 5 | Archadia | 1 | 470 |
| 6 | Billy Reil | 1 | 440 |
| 7 | Bandido, Jr. | 1 | 406 |
| 8 | Dixie | 1 | 350 |
| 9 | Jay Lethal | 1 | 286 |
| 10 | Flip Kendrick | 1 | 168 |
| 11 | Jushin Thunder Liger | 1 | 156 |
| 12 | Ric Blade | 1 | 133 |
| 13 | Teddy Hart | 1 | 132 |
| 14 | Rik Rachet | 1 | 106 |
| 15 | Frankie Kazarian | 1 | 286 |
| 16 | Nick Berk | 2 | 89 |
| 17 | B-Boy | 1 | 76¤ |
| 18 | Deranged | 1 | 69 |
| 19 | Prince Mustafa Ali | 1 | 63 |
| 20 | The Insane Dragon | 1 | 57 |
| 21 | Low Ki | 1 | 42 |
| 21 | Xavier | 1 | 42 |
| 23 | O Dogg | 1 | 23 |
