= NJPW Invasion Tour 2011 =

Japanese pro-wrestling promotion in the United States

- Promotional poster
- Promotion(s): New Japan Pro-Wrestling; Jersey All Pro Wrestling
- Date: May 13-15, 2011
- City: Night 1: Rahway, New Jersey, United States; Night 2: New York City, New York, United States; Night 3: Philadelphia, Pennsylvania, United States
- Venue: Night 1: Rahway Recreation Center; Night 2: Basketball City; Night 3: Asylum Arena

NJPW in North America chronology
← Previous; World Wrestling Peace Festival	Next → Global Wars

NJPW Invasion Tour 2011: Attack on East Coast was the first American tour run by Japanese professional wrestling promotion New Japan Pro-Wrestling (NJPW) in May 2011. The tour was hosted by Jersey All Pro Wrestling (JAPW) and featured all of NJPW's top wrestlers, matches for three of the promotion's four championships and the introduction of a new fifth title.

== Background ==
The tour was first announced on October 3, 2010, when American promotion Jersey All Pro Wrestling (JAPW) announced it had reached a deal with NJPW to host the promotion's first ever tour in the country; NJPW had previously held a stand-alone show in 1996 at the Los Angeles Memorial Sports Arena in Los Angeles, California. NJPW officially announced the "NJPW Invasion Tour 2011: Attack on East Coast" tour on January 4, 2011, during Wrestle Kingdom V in Tokyo Dome, announcing that the events would be taking place on May 13 in Rahway, New Jersey, May 14 in New York City and May 15 in Philadelphia, Pennsylvania. NJPW also announced that during the tour the promotion would introduce its fifth active title, the IWGP Intercontinental Championship. Most of the wrestlers taking part in the tour were NJPW regulars, however, several JAPW workers, who were not regulars with NJPW, also took part in the tour; namely Charlie Haas, Dan Maff, Homicide, Josh Daniels, Low Ki and Rhino. Daniels was a late replacement for a NJPW regular Tama Tonga, who was sidelined with an injury. Hideo Saito and Kazuchika Okada, two NJPW contracted wrestlers, who were at the time on learning excursions to Puerto Rico and American Total Nonstop Action Wrestling (TNA) respectively, also returned to take part in the tour. The official cards for the events were released on May 4. The day before the start of the tour, NJPW held a press conference at the Ramada hotel in Newark, New Jersey. The conference mainly featured wrestlers talking about their feelings about working in the United States, but also featured a storyline development, where Rhino interrupted Togi Makabe and threatened to destroy him, setting up a storyline rivalry between the two, which lasted for the entire tour. Workers at the hotel were reportedly not in on the storyline interruption and were close to calling the police. In Japan, the tour was broadcast on tape delay by Fighting TV Samurai in two two-hour specials. The first concentrated on the IWGP Intercontinental Championship tournament and the second on the other big matches of the tour.

== Events ==
=== Rahway ===
NJPW Invasion Tour 2011: Attack on East Coast
- Promotion(s): Jersey All Pro Wrestling; New Japan Pro-Wrestling
- Date: May 13, 2011
- City: Rahway, New Jersey, U.S.
- Venue: Rahway Recreation Center
- Attendance: 1,800

The first event on the NJPW Invasion Tour 2011: Attack on East Coast tour took place on May 13, 2011, at the Rahway Recreation Center in Rahway, New Jersey. The event featured eight matches and was the only event on the tour to not include any championship matches. The event included all four first round matches in the IWGP Intercontinental Championship tournament, which saw Yujiro Takahashi advance over Hideo Saito, Tetsuya Naito advance over Josh Daniels, Toru Yano advance over Dan Maff and MVP advance over Kazuchika Okada. In the main event tag team match, Charlie Haas and Rhino defeated Hiroshi Tanahashi and Togi Makabe with Rhino pinning Makabe, building up the storyline rivalry between the two and also a future IWGP Heavyweight Championship match between Tanahashi and Haas.

No.	Results	Stipulations	Times
1	Strong Style Thugz (Homicide and Low Ki) defeated Jyushin Thunder Liger and Tiger Mask	Tag team match	10:41
2	Satoshi Kojima defeated Kenny Omega	Singles match	09:29
3	Apollo 55 (Prince Devitt and Ryusuke Taguchi) and Bad Intentions (Giant Bernard and Karl Anderson) defeated Chaos (Davey Richards, Gedo, Jado and Shinsuke Nakamura)	Eight-man tag team match	13:00
4	Yujiro Takahashi defeated Hideo Saito	Singles match; first round in the IWGP Intercontinental Championship tournament	08:28
5	Tetsuya Naito defeated Josh Daniels	Singles match; first round in the IWGP Intercontinental Championship tournament	12:28
6	Toru Yano defeated Dan Maff	Singles match; first round in the IWGP Intercontinental Championship tournament	10:38
7	MVP defeated Kazuchika Okada	Singles match; first round in the IWGP Intercontinental Championship tournament	12:45
8	Charlie Haas and Rhino defeated Hiroshi Tanahashi and Togi Makabe	Tag team match	16:02

=== New York City ===
NJPW Invasion Tour 2011: Attack on East Coast
- Promotion(s): Jersey All Pro Wrestling; New Japan Pro-Wrestling
- Date: May 14, 2011
- City: New York City, New York, U.S.
- Venue: Basketball City
- Attendance: 2,500

The second event on the NJPW Invasion Tour 2011: Attack on East Coast tour took place on May 14, 2011, at Basketball City in New York City, New York. Prior to being announced at Basketball City, the event was scheduled to be held in Brooklyn. The event featured eight matches, two of which were contested for championships. The event also featured semifinals in the IWGP Intercontinental Championship tournament, which saw Toru Yano defeat Yujiro Takahashi and MVP defeat Tetsuya Naito. Following his match, MVP was attacked by Yano to build up the following day's tournament final. In the first title match of the event, Prince Devitt made his seventh successful defense of the IWGP Junior Heavyweight Championship against former champion Low Ki. In the main event of the evening, Hiroshi Tanahashi made his fourth successful defense of the IWGP Heavyweight Championship against former WWE wrestler Charlie Haas. This marked the second time NJPW's top title had been defended in the United States, ten years after Scott Norton had made the original title defense.

No.	Results	Stipulations	Times
1	Kenny Omega defeated Josh Daniels	Singles match	10:22
2	Dan Maff, Jyushin Thunder Liger and Tiger Mask defeated Chaos (Gedo, Jado and Shinsuke Nakamura)	Six-man tag team match	11:50
3	Bad Intentions (Giant Bernard and Karl Anderson) defeated Hideo Saito and Satoshi Kojima	Tag team match	09:55
4	Davey Richards, Homicide and Rhino defeated Kazuchika Okada, Ryusuke Taguchi and Togi Makabe	Six-man tag team match	10:53
5	Prince Devitt (c) defeated Low Ki	Singles match for the IWGP Junior Heavyweight Championship	16:07
6	Toru Yano defeated Yujiro Takahashi	Singles match; semifinals in the IWGP Intercontinental Championship tournament	07:47
7	MVP defeated Tetsuya Naito	Singles match; semifinals in the IWGP Intercontinental Championship tournament	10:57
8	Hiroshi Tanahashi (c) defeated Charlie Haas	Singles match for the IWGP Heavyweight Championship	18:50
(c) / – the champion(s) heading into the match

=== Philadelphia ===
NJPW Invasion Tour 2011: Attack on East Coast
- Promotion(s): Jersey All Pro Wrestling; New Japan Pro-Wrestling
- Date: May 15, 2011
- City: Philadelphia, Pennsylvania, U.S.
- Venue: Asylum Arena
- Attendance: 1,500

The third and final event on the NJPW Invasion Tour 2011: Attack on East Coast tour took place on May 15, 2011, at the Asylum Arena in Philadelphia, Pennsylvania. The event featured eight matches, three of which were contested for championships. The first title match of the event was contested for Jersey All Pro Wrestling's (JAPW) Light Heavyweight Championship, which NJPW wrestler Jyushin Thunder Liger had captured the previous December. In the match Kenny Omega, a regular for both JAPW and NJPW, defeated Liger to become the new champion. Following the fourth match, Lance Archer made his NJPW debut by attacking Satoshi Kojima. Kojima was saved by MVP, who suggested the two should form a tag team together. This played on a NJPW storyline from earlier in the month, when members of the Kojima-gun stable had turned on Kojima and appointed Minoru Suzuki as the leader of the new Suzuki-gun stable. MVP was a member of Kojima-gun, but had not chosen sides in the conflict up until the event. In the second title match of the event, Apollo 55 (Prince Devitt and Ryusuke Taguchi) made their fifth successful defense of the IWGP Junior Heavyweight Tag Team Championship against the Strong Style Thugz (Homicide and Low Ki). In the third title match of the event, MVP defeated Toru Yano in the finals of a tournament to become the inaugural IWGP Intercontinental Champion. The event concluded with a hardcore rules match between Rhino and Togi Makabe, playing off the history of the former ECW Arena. Makabe ended up winning the final match of the tour over the former ECW and WWE wrestler.

No.	Results	Stipulations	Times
1	Tetsuya Naito defeated Hideo Saito	Singles match	10:07
2	Chaos (Gedo, Jado, Shinsuke Nakamura and Yujiro Takahashi) defeated Charlie Haas, Josh Daniels, Kazuchika Okada and Tiger Mask	Eight-man tag team match	12:47
3	Kenny Omega defeated Jyushin Thunder Liger (c)	Singles match for the JAPW Light Heavyweight Championship	10:42
4	Bad Intentions (Giant Bernard and Karl Anderson) defeated Dan Maff and Satoshi Kojima	Tag team match	14:39
5	Apollo 55 (Prince Devitt and Ryusuke Taguchi) (c) defeated Strong Style Thugz (Homicide and Low Ki)	Tag team match for the IWGP Junior Heavyweight Tag Team Championship	15:18
6	Hiroshi Tanahashi defeated Davey Richards	Singles match	14:45
7	MVP defeated Toru Yano	Singles match for the inaugural IWGP Intercontinental Championship; tournament final	09:27
8	Togi Makabe defeated Rhino	Hardcore rules match	15:17
(c) / – the champion(s) heading into the match

== Aftermath ==
MVP held the IWGP Intercontinental Championship for five months and successfully defended it twice in rematches against Toru Yano, before being defeated by Masato Tanaka on October 10, 2011, at Destruction '11. Following the Invasion Tour, Prince Devitt held the IWGP Junior Heavyweight Championship for another month, before losing it to Kota Ibushi in his eighth defense on June 18 at Dominion 6.18. Apollo 55 held the IWGP Junior Heavyweight Tag Team Championship for another five months and successfully defended it two more times, before losing it to the No Remorse Corps (Davey Richards and Rocky Romero) at Destruction '11.

Following the Invasion Tour, JAPW stopped promoting shows due to the heavy financial losses caused by the tour. The promotion eventually returned, however, only promoting one anniversary show per year. Five of the six JAPW regulars who took part in the tour did not make another appearance for NJPW. The only exception was Low Ki, who joined NJPW in April 2012, and concluded his return tour by defeating Prince Devitt for the IWGP Junior Heavyweight Championship on May 3 at Wrestling Dontaku 2012, in a rematch of their title match in New York City. Lance Archer, however, did become a regular for NJPW following the tour, joining Suzuki-gun and winning the 2011 G1 Tag League at the end of the year alongside the stable's leader, Minoru Suzuki. Hideo Saito ended his excursion with the tour and returned to NJPW at Dominion 6.18, attacking Yuji Nagata and joining the Chaos stable. Kazuchika Okada meanwhile returned to Total Nonstop Action Wrestling and did not return to NJPW until January 2012. Repackaged as the "Rainmaker", Okada received a strong push and just a month later at The New Beginning defeated Hiroshi Tanahashi to end his thirteen-month reign as the IWGP Heavyweight Champion and become the new champion in what NJPW called the "upset of the century".

NJPW eventually returned to the United States in May 2014 under a working arrangement with the Ring of Honor (ROH) promotion.

== See also ==
- Global Wars
- ROH/NJPW War of the Worlds
- G1 Special in USA
