= Jersey All Pro Wrestling =

American independent wrestling promotion

- Acronym: JAPW
- Founded: April 19, 1997
- Defunct: February 2018
- Style: Professional wrestling
- Headquarters: New Jersey
- Founder: Frank Iadeavia
- Owner: Jeff Shapiro
- Formerly: NSWA

Jersey All Pro Wrestling (JAPW) was an independent wrestling promotion based in New Jersey, United States.

== History ==
=== 1997 ===
Jersey All Pro Wrestling was an independent wrestling promotion that was founded by "Fat" Frank Iadeavia and Angel Surita on April 19, 1997. This promotion was born out of a dream of "Fat" Frank and Angel. They wanted to take the promotion in a different direction than others. "Fat" Frank and Angel took a group of misfit wrestlers who were not used in other promotion for various reasons and booked them in a show on that night under the promotion name.

During 1997, only two shows were run, Northern States Wrestling Alliance a precursor to JAPW, the wrestlers were friends who were not getting booked in other wrestling shows due to the politics in the New Jersey wrestling scene at that time. Also featured wrestlers like A-Train, and Alexander the Great who are better known as D-Von Dudley and Big Dick Dudley respectively. Other wrestlers like Rockin' Rebel and Little Guido who moved on to ECW as well as others became the foundation of the future of JAPW.

During July 1997, "Fat" Frank searched for a venue to house the promotion. While looking for a venue, he met a local businessman by the name of Jeff Shapiro. Shapiro owned a local building called Charity Hall and was also a wrestling fan. Iadevaia and Shapiro agreed to a one-year lease of Charity Hall. On July 25, 1997, JAPW was born. During the early days of JAPW, they featured wrestlers who were established in the New Jersey independent wrestling scene looking for that big break. One of the first of the JAPW originals to take that opportunity and shine was Homicide who made his debut on September 12, 1997. Also during the early days of JAPW, their shows were bloody and violent. Hardcore wrestling during that time was due to the craze of ECW and JAPW was seen as an alternative. Not long after, several ECW stars started making appearances in JAPW due to Iadevaia's friendship with former ECW star Jason. The Pitbulls, 911, The Samoan Gangsta Party, and others made their debut for the promotion during 1997. Due to JAPW increasing popularity, it was considered the hottest ticket in Bayonne at the time, and fans craved blood and violence like their ECW counterparts. On December 5, 1997, JAPW closed out their first year with Night of Barb Wire #1. It saw the Blood Angels defeat Homicide and Don Montoya to win the vacant JAPW Tag Team Championship in what is considered one of the most brutal and bloody matches in JAPW history.

=== 1998 ===
In early 1998, JAPW flourished and attracted a larger fan base. Due to JAPW's continued growth, Jeff Shapiro saw the potential the promotion had and thus became an investor. Then on March 28, 1998, JAPW did something their critics and other New Jersey promoters never thought they would do: last a year and put on a their First Anniversary Show and Convention. The show and convention took place at the Sheraton Hotel in Newark. The convention had over 2,500 fans attend, and the live event had over 1,000 fans in attendance. This was the biggest at that time to ever hit the New Jersey independent wrestling scene. That show attracted some of biggest names in business including Stone Cold Steve Austin, The Dudley Boyz, Rob Van Dam, Tommy Dreamer, Paul Heyman, The Wild Samoans, Al Snow, Shane Douglas, and Abdullah the Butcher. Don Montoya, Reckless Youth, Russ and Charlie Haas (the Haas Brothers), The Big Unit, Nova, The Nation Of Immigration (Homicide & Kane "D"), Chino Martinez and The Sickness were the local homegrown in the show. After the JAPW First Anniversary Show, they showed they had the potential to be a major promotion thus putting the independent wrestling scene on notice.

The rest of 1998 included more growth for the young promotion. "We guarantee excitement" and "blood is better" quickly became two trademark slogans for the up-and-coming promotion. Charity Hall continued to sell out crowds for each and every show JAPW put on there. Along with the sell out crowd, JAPW brought in top talent and showcased local undiscovered talent that became stars. Also during that time, the shows became increasingly more violent in nature with more blood and weapons. Death matches became commonplace in JAPW with every show featuring such weapons as barbed wire, thumbtacks, fire, mouse traps, light tubes, and other weapons became standard. Glenn "The Maniac" Strange, "Lightning" Lou Diamond, Kane "D", Homicide, Jay Lover, and Low Life Louie led the way with their extreme, hardcore, and brutal style.

=== 2000 ===
JAPW peaked in popularity around 2000. With this increased popularity, JAPW was all over the news. The promotion was even featured in every major New Jersey newspaper and on major television stations. On a national level JAPW was featured in The New York Times, ABC's Nightline, and MSNBC. The newfound publicity helped the company flourish even more with record attendance numbers. But that also came with increasing scrutiny towards Bayonne mayor, New Jersey Senator Joseph Doria, and New Jersey governor Christine Todd Whitman. While there were only a few complaints against the promotion, the politicians used this hardcore/extreme wrestling as an election ploy to keep their names in the press. During the spring of 2000, the City of Bayonne revoked JAPW's entertainment license, preventing the promotion from running events at Charity Hall. This forced JAPW to find a different venue to house their shows and alter their wrestling style. This was done to appease the local politicians who were now fully aware of Jersey All Pro Wrestling and their reputation. On September 18, 2000, New Jersey governor Whitman signed into law bill number A2304 banning extreme wrestling. This bill altered the face of JAPW. With the bill putting the promotion in a proverbial chokehold, the outlook for the future of the promotion seemed bleak. But in November 2000, ECW was facing bankruptcy, and JAPW had plans to put on a show called "South Philly Invasion." JAPW was planning to go back to their roots, but once again politics from Pennsylvania State Athletic Commission put a quick stop to it and prevented the show from moving forward.

=== 2001-2002 ===
JAPW was allowed to return to Bayonne and Charity Hall but not without major changes. JAPW has to abide by strict Bayonne and New Jersey rules because it was under scrutiny from both the city and state. Plus, officials were sent to the shows to monitor the promotion. Thus ended the era "Blood is Better" on February 2, 2001. Frank Iadevaia, Jeff Shapiro, Pierre Pilger, and Angel Surita met with many of the promotions wrestlers to talk about the future of the promotion. If the company was going exist into the future, than change was crucial. So the company went into a new direction. In effect of this change "We are hard hitting" became the new slogan and rally cry for JAPW. Many stars were influential during this new era, but the leaders of the new era were Da Hit Squad, Homicide, and Low Ki. JAPW once again showed their innovative style when they were the first independent promotion to showcase the strong style in the United States on a regular basis.

It was also during 2001, that Philadelphia joined Bayonne as stops during their monthly shows for the promotion. By the end of 2001, JAPW invaded Hackettstown. During that year, many stars had breakout years, but it would be known as the breakout year for Da Hit Squad (Monsta Mack and Mafia), who were into their second reign as the JAPW Tag Team Champions. "Wall" become a common chant for the Bayonne fans whenever Da Hit Squad were in action. They chanted "wall, wall, wall..." until Da Hit Squad Gorilla Press Slammed their opponents out of the ring and into the wall at Charity Hall. The Wall is said to be one of the most talked and devastating finishers in wrestling at that time. While a top force in the JAPW tag team division, Da Hit Squad also elevated other wrestlers into future stars with their ability to put over other opponents. The Briscoe Brothers, Dixie, Insane Dragon, Deranged, JT Jobber, and many others benefited from working with Da Hit Squad. Dixie and Insane Dragon were two local Bayonne brothers who got their starts the JAPW Wrestling School also had a breakout year. Dixie and Insane Dragon became fan favorites and underdogs while on their quest to capture the JAPW Tag Team Championship. On May 18, 2001, at Youth Gone Wild, Dixie and Insane Dragon defeated Da Hit Squad to become the JAPW Tag Team Champions. Their reign only lasted 50 days as family drama slowly unfolded between the two brothers. During the feud, other family members get involved such as their father and younger sister.

On December 15, 2001, JAPW learned of Russ Haas's passing, which affected all in the JAPW locker room. Then on February 2, 2002, JAPW presented the Russ Haas Memorial Show. Over 600 fans attended the memorial event while over 50 professional wrestlers from around the United States showed up and donated their salary for that evening. Even wrestlers from Florida flew up to the show as a show of respect for Haas to work the show. Charlie and the rest of the Haas family were also in attendance. The proceeds raised at the show went to the widow of Russ Haas. That night for the first time ever in JAPW history, a Triple Crown Champion was determined. The match was contested in a Triple Threat Match. JAPW Heavyweight Champion Homicide was challenged by JAPW Light Heavyweight Champion The Insane Dragon and JAPW New Jersey State Champion Dixie. Dixie won the match and became the Triple Crown Champion.

JAPW was in talks to do business with California based Xtreme Pro Wrestling when XPW was making its East Coast debut in 2002.

JAPW also made their debut in Seaside Heights in 2002 with several shows during the summer. They ended the year back in Bayonne. In December 2002, JAPW learned the fate of their existence at Charity Hall. Jeff Shapiro sold Charity Hall to a developer, and the promotion was forced to look for another venue to house the shows. A short term was in place until JAPW found another venue to house the monthly shows.

=== 2003-present ===
JAPW held their events once a month in small venues such as the Rahway Rec Center, and the Golden Door Charter School in Jersey City. On May 22, 2010, Japanese legend Jushin Thunder Liger made his debut for JAPW, wrestling Homicide in the main event of the show in which he lost. In the fall of 2010 JAPW started a working relationship with New Japan Pro-Wrestling (NJPW), which saw Jushin Thunder Liger capturing the JAPW Light Heavyweight Championship in December 2010. In May 2011 JAPW hosted NJPW in the United States during their Invasion Tour 2011: Attack on East Coast. The NJPW tour caused heavy financial losses for JAPW, leading to the promotion going on a hiatus from 2010 until April 14, 2012, when they held their 14th Anniversary Show in Rahway. Afterwards, JAPW promoted only one anniversary show per year.

On September 23, 2015, JAPW founder and promoter Frank Iadevaia died in his sleep at 43.

They have not promoted an event since February 2018.

== Notable alumni ==
- 911
- Abdullah the Butcher
- Ace Darling
- A.J. Styles
- Al Snow
- BG James
- Billy Reil
- Booker T
- Brodie Lee
- Charlie Haas
- Christian Cage
- Cryme Tyme
- Dan Maff
- Devon Storm
- Eddie Kingston
- El Generico
- Homicide
- Human Tornado
- Keith Lee
- Kevin Steen
- Kevin Thorn
- Kenny Omega
- Frankie Kazarian
- Jack Evans
- Jason Knight
- Jerry Lawler
- Jushin Thunder Liger
- Jay Lethal
- Kamala
- Kazuchika Okada
- Kip James
- Matt Jackson
- Mia Yim
- Mike Quackenbush
- Monsta Mack
- Monty Brown
- Necro Butcher
- New Jack
- Nick Gage
- Nick Jackson
- Rey Mysterio Jr.
- Rob Van Dam
- Russ Haas
- Samoa Joe
- The Samoan Gangster Party
- Shane Douglas
- Sharmell
- Super Nova
- Taylor Wilde
- Teddy Hart
- Terry Funk
- The Sandman
- Tommy Dreamer
- Tony DeVito
- Trent Acid
- Vader
- Xavier

== Championships ==
=== Current champions ===
Championship	Current Champion(s)	Previous	Date Won	Days	Location
JAPW Heavyweight Championship	Retired	BLK Jeez	February 25, 2018	—	—
JAPW Light Heavyweight Championship	Retired	Archadia	February 25, 2018	—	—
JAPW Women's Championship	Retired	LuFisto	February 25, 2018	—	—

=== Retired and inactive championships ===
Championship	Last Champion(s)	Previous	Date Won	Location
JAPW New Jersey State Championship	Brodie Lee	Charlie Haas	May 22, 2010	Rahway, NJ
JAPW Tag Team Championship	Strong Style Thugz/Outlaws (Eddie Kingston and Homicide)	vacant	April 14, 2012	Rahway, NJ
JAPW Fan's Championship	PJ	N/A	August 6, 1999	Bayonne, NJ
JAPW Student Championship	Roach	Tony Lazaro	April 12, 2002	Bayonne, NJ
JAPW Suicidal Championship	Jay Lover	Louie Ramos	August 19, 2000	Sayreville, NJ
JAPW Television Championship	Eddie Thomas	Skinhead Ivan	December 13, 2003	Rahway, NJ
JAPW Students Tag Team Championship	Team Thomas (Eddie & Miles Thomas)	Just G & Johnny T	February 8, 2002	Bayonne, NJ
