= John Silver (wrestler) =

American professional wrestler (born 1990)

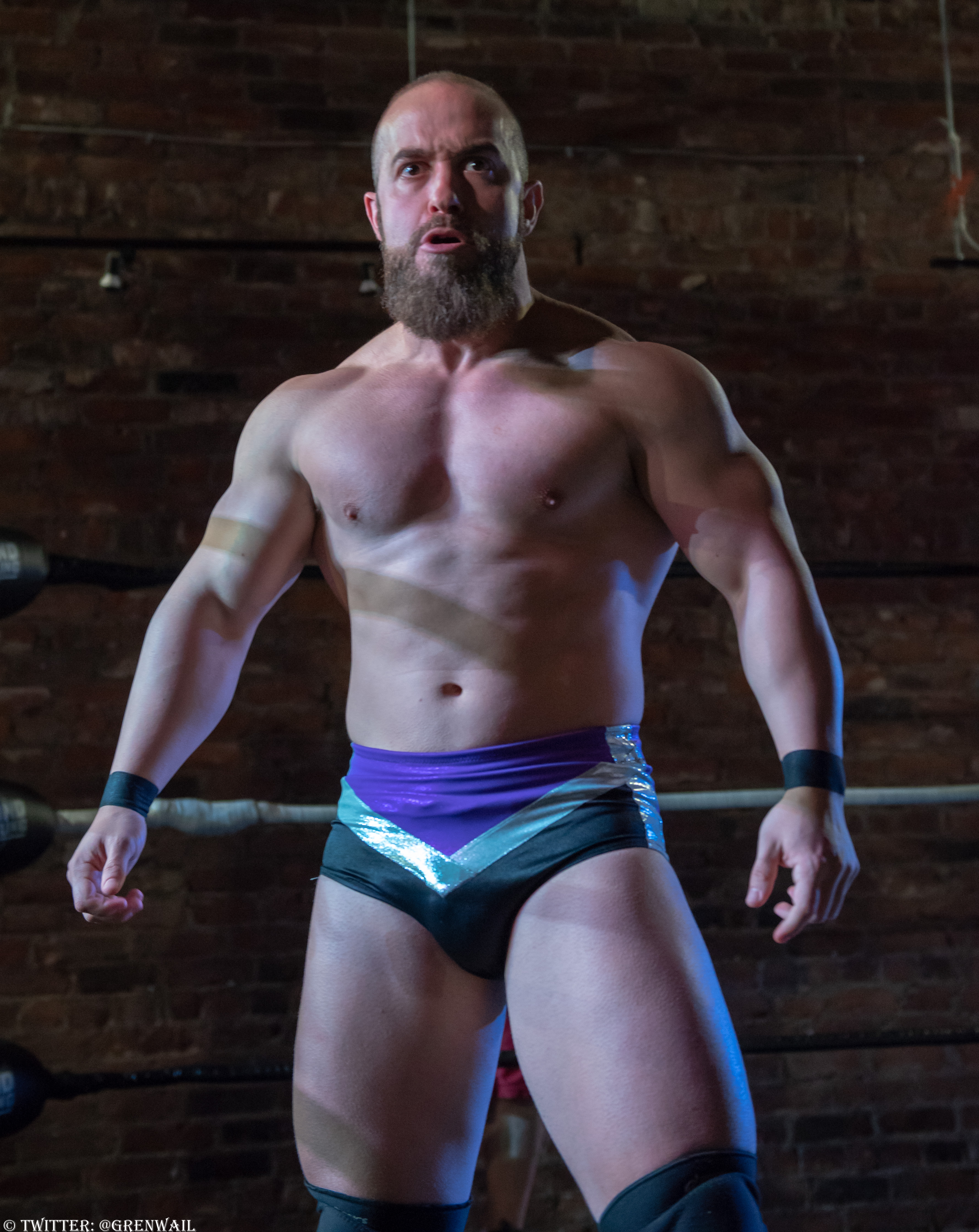
- Silver in 2019

Personal information
- Born: John Anthony Silver; June 4, 1990 (age 36) Wantagh, New York, U.S.
- Spouse: Denise Liguori (m. 2026)

Professional wrestling career
- Ring names: Four; John Silver; Johnny Silver; Rob Grymes; Shard
- Billed height: 5 ft 4 in (163 cm)
- Billed weight: 178 lb (81 kg)
- Billed from: "The Keep"
- Trained by: Mikey Whipwreck
- Debut: 2007

John Anthony Silver (born June 4, 1990) is an American professional wrestler. As of 2019, he is signed to All Elite Wrestling (AEW) as a member of The Dark Order. He also makes appearances for their sister promotion Ring of Honor (ROH). He is also known for his work with Combat Zone Wrestling (CZW), where he was a one-time CZW World Heavyweight Champion, and for his tag team with Alex Reynolds – known as The Beaver Boys, the duo were one-time CZW World Tag Team Champions and Pro Wrestling Guerrilla (PWG) where former one-time PWG World Tag Team Champions.

== Early life ==
John Anthony Silver was born on June 4, 1990, in Wantagh, New York.

== Professional wrestling career ==
=== Early career ===
Silver was trained by Mikey Whipwreck and made his debut in 2007, primarily appearing for the New York Wrestling Connection (NYWC).

=== Combat Zone Wrestling ===
==== Initial presence within the tag division (2011, 2013) ====
On May 1, 2011, at a CZW Wired television taping, Silver made his debut for Combat Zone Wrestling (CZW), in a defeat to Dalton Castle. He did not appear for the promotion again until two years later.

On May 11, 2013, at Proving Grounds, Silver returned to CZW, alongside his tag team partner in New York Wrestling Connection, Alex Reynolds. The two men, known as the Beaver Boys, faced CZW World Tag Team Champions BLK-OUT (BLK Jeez and Ruckus) in a losing effort. On July 13, at New Heights, the Beaver Boys got their first win in CZW by defeating 4Loco (Azrieal and Bandido Jr.). However, 4Loco got their win back a month later, at Tangled Web. On December 14, at Cage of Death XV, the Beaver Boys defeated The Colony (Fire Ant and Green Ant) in a #1 contendership match for the World Tag Team Championship.

==== CZW World Tag Team Champion (2014) ====
On January 11, 2014, at Answering the Challenge, the Beaver Boys won the World Tag Team Championship, defeating BLK-OUT. Their first title defence was against Murderer's Row (formerly 4Loco; Azrieal and Bandido Jr.) on February 8, at CZW's 15th Anniversary Show. Their second title defence was against The Front (Jaka and Sozio) on March 3, at High Stakes. On April 27, at CZW to Infinity, the Beaver Boys were defeated by Juicy Product (J. T. Dunn and David Starr), ending their reign at 106 days. Following this, the Beaver Boys began feuding with Juicy Product, and lost their rematch to them a month later, at Proving Grounds. They had two other chances to regain the titles in four-way and three-way matches involving OI4K (Dave Crist and Jake Crist) and Team Tremendous (Bill Carr and Dan Barry), but were unsuccessful. It was not until Cage of Death XVI that they won a tag team match, when they defeated Team Tremendous.

==== Feud with Team Tremendous (2015) ====
On January 11, 2014, at To Live Is To Die, Team Tremendous defeated the Beaver Boys, by disqualification. The next month, at CZW Sixteen: An Ultraviolent Anniversary, Silver teamed with Rex Lawless-Silver and Chuck Taylor-Silver, defeating Team Tremendous and Dick Justice in a six-man tag team tables elimination match. On March 14, at Deja Vu, Silver unsuccessfully challenged Joe Gacy in a singles match for his Wired Championship. On May 9, at Proving Grounds, The Beaver Boys returned in a successful effort over Bill Carr and his new tag team partner, Buxx Belmar. On July 11, at New Heights, the Beaver Boys were involved in a four-way matches with champions OI4K, the Young Bucks and a reunited Team Tremendous, with the latter winning the match. On October 10, at Tangled Web, the feud was ended in a rematch for the titles, in which the Beaver Boys lost.

==== Championship pursuits (2016–2017) ====
In 2016, Silver began a singles career, but only featured for the promotion twice, firstly, in a defeat to Tim Donst at Prelude to Violence, and secondly, in a defeat to Lio Rush, in a Wired Championship title match at The Boss is Back. He returned to the promotion almost a year later, on August 5, 2017, at Once in a Lifetime, in a defeat to Maxwell Jacob Friedman, once again for the Wired Championship. On September 9, at Down With The Sickness, Silver won his first singles match in three years, defeating David Starr. On October 14, at The Wolf of Wrestling, Silver was involved in a four-way match, with Space Monkey, Trey Miguel and eventual winner J. T. Dunn.

==== Feud with Alex Reynolds (2017–2018) ====
On November 11, 2017, at Night of Infamy, the Beaver Boys faced The REP (Dave McCall and Nate Carter) in a tag team match, and their first since December 2015. Silver appeared in the next match involving CZW World Heavyweight Champion Shane Strickland and his challenger Joe Gacy, making the save on Strickland while dealing with Gacy's henchmen. He unmasked one of them, which happened to be Reynolds, effectively breaking up the Beaver Boys. On December 9, at Cage of Death 19, Silver attacked Reynolds and Dan Barry (the other wrestler who was unmasked at Night of Infamy), during their four-way tag team match for the CZW World Tag Team Championship distracting Barry for The REP to win the match.

Silver began 2018 by continuing his feud with Reynolds. On February 23, at Greetings from Asbury Park, Silver lost to Reynolds in a singles match. On July 28, at New Heights, Silver was about to face a mystery opponent, when Reynolds came to the ring and announced that Matt Riddle was the one to take on Silver. After Silver pinned Riddle to win the match, the two men shook hands, until Reynolds ambushed Silver, before he was quickly laid out by Riddle. On August 11, at Business as Usual, Reynolds chose Myron Reed as Silver's opponent in the Pick Your Poison match; Silver defeated Reed at the event. Later, Silver used the same stipulation on Reynolds and chose Trent Barreta as his opponent, which Reynolds ended up winning. The feud culminated on September 8, at Down with the Sickness, where Silver defeated Reynolds in a ladder match.

==== CZW World Heavyweight Champion (2019–2020) ====
On April 13, 2019 at Best of the Best 18, Silver defeated Fred Yehi, Gary Jay, and Kris Statlander in a four-way quarter-final match, by forcing Jay to tap out. In the semi-final, he faced Jordan Oliver (although Oliver's Wired Championship was not on the line), defeating him with an inverted backbreaker. In the final, Silver faced the previous year's winner, David Starr. He won the tournament as well as the CZW World Heavyweight Championship. Following the match, Silver and owner D. J. Hyde were laid out, and the Best of the Best trophy was destroyed by Anthony Gangone and other wrestlers from House of Glory. His first defense of the title came on May 11 at Tangled Web 10, against former champion Matt Tremont. On September 13, at Down with the Sickness, Silver was defeated by Gacy, in a three-way match also involving Claxton, which ended his reign at 153 days. From October to December, he was involved in a series of matches with Claxton. The two men traded wins over each other at To Hell and Back and Cage of Death XXI.

=== WWE appearances (2012, 2018, 2019) ===
Silver has worked as enhancement talent for WWE on three occasions. On June 17, 2012, at No Way Out, Silver, under the ring name Rob Grymes, and alongside Dan Delaney (Danilo Anfibio, now a WWE referee), wrestled in a two-on-one handicap match with Ryback. On the March 28, 2018 episode of NXT (taped March 7), Silver was defeated by Lars Sullivan. On the September 10, 2019 episode of SmackDown, Silver, under the modified ring name Johnny Silver, teamed with Alex Reynolds (as Alex Keaton), in a match at Madison Square Garden with Heavy Machinery (Otis and Tucker), where he took the pin.

=== Chikara (2012–2014, 2018) ===
In early 2012, Silver debuted, under a mask, as a member of "Gekido", a violent outsider stable, led by the villainous 17, who were coming to Chikara to challenge Mike Quackenbush and other top babyfaces. In storyline, three of the members, alternately known as "The Swarm", were evil ants, mocking the popular trio of ant heroes known as "The Colony". These three were said to be failed students of Chikara's Wrestle Factory school, who had instead turned to the mysterious 17, who taught decidedly less honorable and scrupulous techniques, to finish their training. Silver's character, "The Shard", was another student of 17, who was also meant to be an evil, mocking doppelganger of Chikara's popular Jigsaw, just as 17 himself was an evil, mocking doppelganger of Quackenbush.

After feuding with Chikara's top heroes for months, the war eventually got out of hand, as Quackenbush started injuring the Gekido members, trying to exact revenge for them injuring wrestlers to begin with. This didn't sit well with Jigsaw, and he ultimately turned on Quackenbush, instead teaming with his own doppelganger Shard. Their team would eventually be dubbed "The Pieces of Hate", and they would have much success. This success culminated in winning the Chikara Campeonatos de Parejas tag team championships, at the June 2013 event Aniversario: Never Compromise. They would go on to retain the titles for over a year, throughout the entirety of an elaborate storyline that saw the company "close down" and splinter off into various satellite promotions. They eventually lost the belts to the popular team of The Throwbacks in July 2014.

They continued to team together afterwards, both part of a much larger Mega-Faction known as "The Flood", a stable made up of various heel stables from Chikara's history (as well as new members). They represented "The Flood" at Chikara's signature King of Trios event in September 2014, teaming with Gekido leader 17. During their first round match against the colorful "Knight Eye for the Pirate Guy" tandem, however, after being confronted by his real-life brother Jolly Roger for his recently evil ways, Jigsaw ultimately walked out on his Gekido partners, contributing to them losing in the second round. The Shard continued to operate as a member of "The Flood" until November 2014, when, as the result of a loss, he was "killed" by the monstrous Flood leader Deucalion.

Silver would appear one final time for Chikara, years later in late 2018, unmasked and under his regular name, as a member of "Team Beyond", representing the promotion Beyond Wrestling, on the winning side of a 7-on-7 Cibernetico elimination match.

=== Pro Wrestling Guerrilla (2015) ===
On February 27, 2015 at From Out Of Nowhere, the Beaver Boys made their debut for Pro Wrestling Guerrilla (PWG), as heels, in a defeat to Best Friends (Chuck Taylor and Trent?). On April 3, at Don't Sweat The Technique, they were defeated by then-PWG World Tag Team Champions, World's Cutest Tag Team (Candice LeRae and Joey Ryan) in a non-title match. On May 22, they took part in PWG's ninth, and final, edition of the Dynamite Duumvirate Tag Team Title Tournament. In the first round, they defeated Team Tremendous (Bill Carr and Dan Barry), and in the semi-final, they won the World Tag Team Championship by defeating Monster Mafia (Ethan Page and Josh Alexander), who had beaten World's Cutest Tag Team earlier that night. Their first and only defence of the title was in the final, where they were defeated by Andrew Everett and Trevor Lee. On June 26 at Mystery Vortex III: Rock And Shock The Nation, Silver's only singles match for the company came in a defeat to Brian Cage.

=== All Elite Wrestling ===
==== Early appearances (2019) ====
Silver and Alex Reynolds made their debut for All Elite Wrestling (AEW), on the October 16, 2019 episode of AEW Dynamite, losing to Santana and Ortiz. On the October 30 episode of Dynamite, they and Q. T. Marshall were defeated by Best Friends (Chuck Taylor and Trent?) and Orange Cassidy. On the December 10 episode of Dark, Silver and Reynolds were defeated by the Jurassic Express (Luchasaurus and Marko Stunt). The following night on Dynamite, after Reynolds lost to Jon Moxley, later in the episode, they were shown in a vignette with The Dark Order spokesman communicating to Reynolds through the hotel television. Silver entered the room and asked Reynolds who he was talking to, but he could not say. On the December 18 episode of Dynamite, Silver and Reynolds aligned themselves with The Dark Order.

==== The Dark Order (2019–present) ====
On the February 19 edition of AEW Dynamite Silver and Reynolds were entered into a 20 man Tag Team Battle Royal however both members suffered quick elimination from the match by a double clothesline from Frankie Kazarian. Silver and Reynolds stayed at ringside using a distraction from the Dark Order ringside spokesman to eliminate SoCalUncensored from the match continuing the build to towards the Exalted One Brodie Lee's arrival. On the March 4 episode of Dynamite, Silver suffered another loss while teaming with fellow Dark Order members Reynolds, Stu Greyson and Evil Uno against SCU and future Dark Order supporter Colt Cabana. Silver and Reynolds primarily appeared on AEW Dark following their 8 man tag team loss being defeated on both May 20 & Jun 11 to The Nightmare Family's Dustin Rhodes & Q. T. Marshall and the newly formed team of Joey Janela & Sonny Kiss.

On the July 2 instalment of AEW Dark Silver and Reynolds alongside #5 Alan Angels defeated Joe Alonzo, Shawn Dean & Will Hobbs in a 6 man tag team match marking their first win as members of The Dark Order. Silver and Reynolds suffered another loss on July 16 against Best Friends on AEW Dark. On August 5 Silver and Reynolds faced Cody Rhodes and Matt Cardona in a tag team match on AEW Dynamite. Although controlling a majority of the match, Silver was knocked to the floor by Rhodes allowing Cardona to pick up the victory by pinning Reynolds.

On August 12 Silver scored his second win as a member of The Dark Order this time teaming with Reynolds and Colt Cabana on AEW Dark against D3, Faboo Andre & Ryzin. The following night on AEW Dynamite, Silver and Reynolds suffered yet another loss this time teaming with #5 Alan Angels in a losing effort to The Elite The Young Bucks & Kenny Omega. The team's third win came on the September 2nd episode of dark after defeating Brandon Bullock & Shawn Dean in tag team competition.

On September 5, 2020 Silver apace with Reynolds made their Pay Per View debut's at AEW All Out in Jacksonville, Florida. Accompanied to the Ring by #5 & #10, Silver and Reynolds fell short to Private Party Marq Quen & Isiah Kassidy to open the show. Silver again gained victory staging with Reynolds, Evil Uno and Stu Grayson to defeat Gunn Club and Private Party. On the September 24th edition of AEW Dark, Silver made his singles debut defeating Q. T. Marshall. On October 7 and 14 Silver and Reynolds teamed with #10 and gain two decisive victories for The Dark Order. Alongside Reynolds, Silver suffered defeat in a four way tag team match on AEW Dynamite on October 21 to The Young Bucks. The following week on Dark, Silver joined #10 Preston Vance and Colt Cabana to defeat Cezar Bononi, Fuego Del Sol & Shawn Dean in a six man tag team match. The trio looked to replicate the win on the November 4 AEW Dynamite but came short losing to Cody Rhodes & Gunn Club.

At AEW Full Gear 2020, John Silver made his singles debut on pay per view losing to Orange Cassidy in just under 10 minutes. Silver rejoined Reynolds on the November 18 edition of AEW Dark to gain another victory this time over Aaron Solow & Lee Johnson. On November 25 Silver lost a singles match to Hangman Adam Page, following his defeat The Dark Order extended a formal invitation towards Page to join the Dark Order. On December 2 episode of AEW Dynamite Silver and Reynolds both participated in the Dynamite Diamond Battle Royal which was won by Maxwell Jacob Friedman. On the December 16 edition of AEW Dynamite Reynolds and Silver teamed with Hangman Adam Page in a losing effort to face Isiah Kassidy, Marq Quen & Matt Hardy. On December 23 Silver and Reynolds scored another victory over Shawn Dean and Tyson Maddux in tag team competition.

On December 30 AEW held Brodie Lee's Celebration of Life on AEW Dynamite. Silver accompanied each The Dark Order member to the ring prior to their match as well as gain a tribute victory to Mr Brodie Lee while teaming with Reynolds and Hangman Adam Page against Inner Circle members Proud and Powerful (Santana & Ortiz) and Maxwell Jacob Friedman. Silver finished the match pinning Ortiz after a discus lariat in homage to Brodie Lee. Following the match Erick Redbeard joined the trio in celebration of their late friend's passing. Silver finished 2020 with an overall record of nine wins and thirteen losses under The Dark Order Banner placing him 51st out of 2020's active AEW Roster.

Silver was suspected to have suffered a dislocated shoulder in a main event title match against AEW TNT Champion Darby Allin on the March 25th episode of AEW Dynamite; It was confirmed the next day by Silver on his twitter account. His timetable for return was listed at 4–6 weeks.

== Personal life ==
Silver got engaged to Denise Liguori in June 2025. They got married on September 19, 2026.

== Championships and accomplishments ==
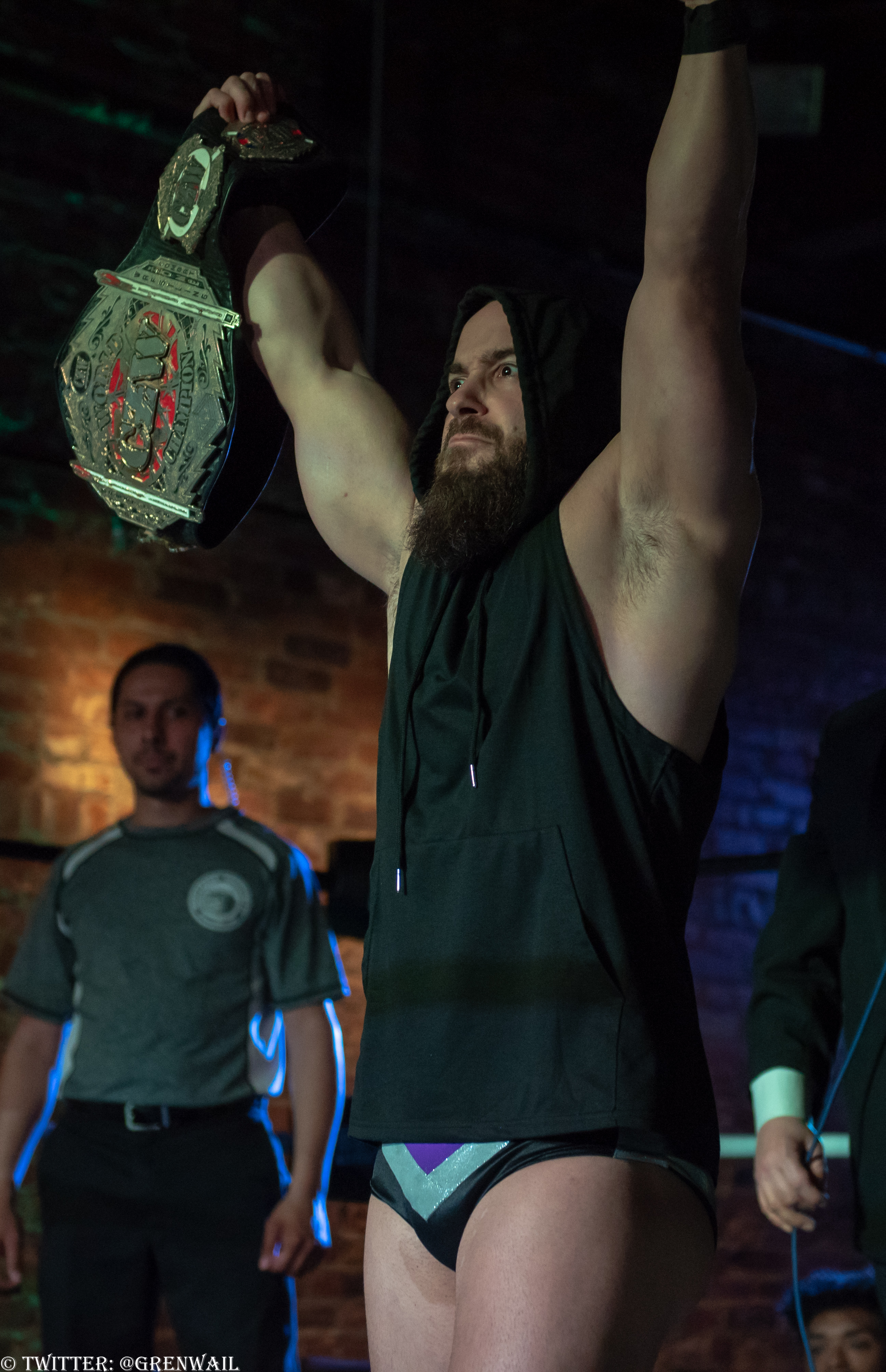
Silver as CZW World Heavyweight Champion in 2019

- Beyond Wrestling
  - Tournament for Tomorrow (2018) - with Alex Reynolds
- Combat Zone Wrestling
  - CZW World Heavyweight Championship (1 time)
  - CZW World Tag Team Championship (1 time ) – with Alex Reynolds
  - Best of the Best 18 (2019)
- Chikara
  - Chikara Campeonatos de Parejas (1 time) - with Jigsaw
  - Tag World Grand Prix (2013) - with Jigsaw
- Cultaholic
  - Most Underrated Wrestler (2020)
- Fight The World Wrestling
  - FTW Gen-X Championship (1 time)
- Five Borough Wrestling
  - FBW Tag Team Tournament (2014) - with Alex Reynolds
- New York Wrestling Connection
  - NYWC Heavyweight Championship (1 time)
  - NYWC Fusion Championship (1 time)
  - NYWC Tag Team Championship (1 time) – with Alex Reynolds
- Pro Wrestling Guerrilla
  - PWG World Tag Team Championship (1 time) – with Alex Reynolds
- Pro Wrestling Syndicate
  - PWS Tag Team Championship (2 times) – with Pat Buck
- Pro Wrestling Illustrated
  - Ranked No. 247 of the top 500 singles wrestlers in the PWI 500 in 2021
