= BLK Jeez =

American professional wrestler (born 1975)

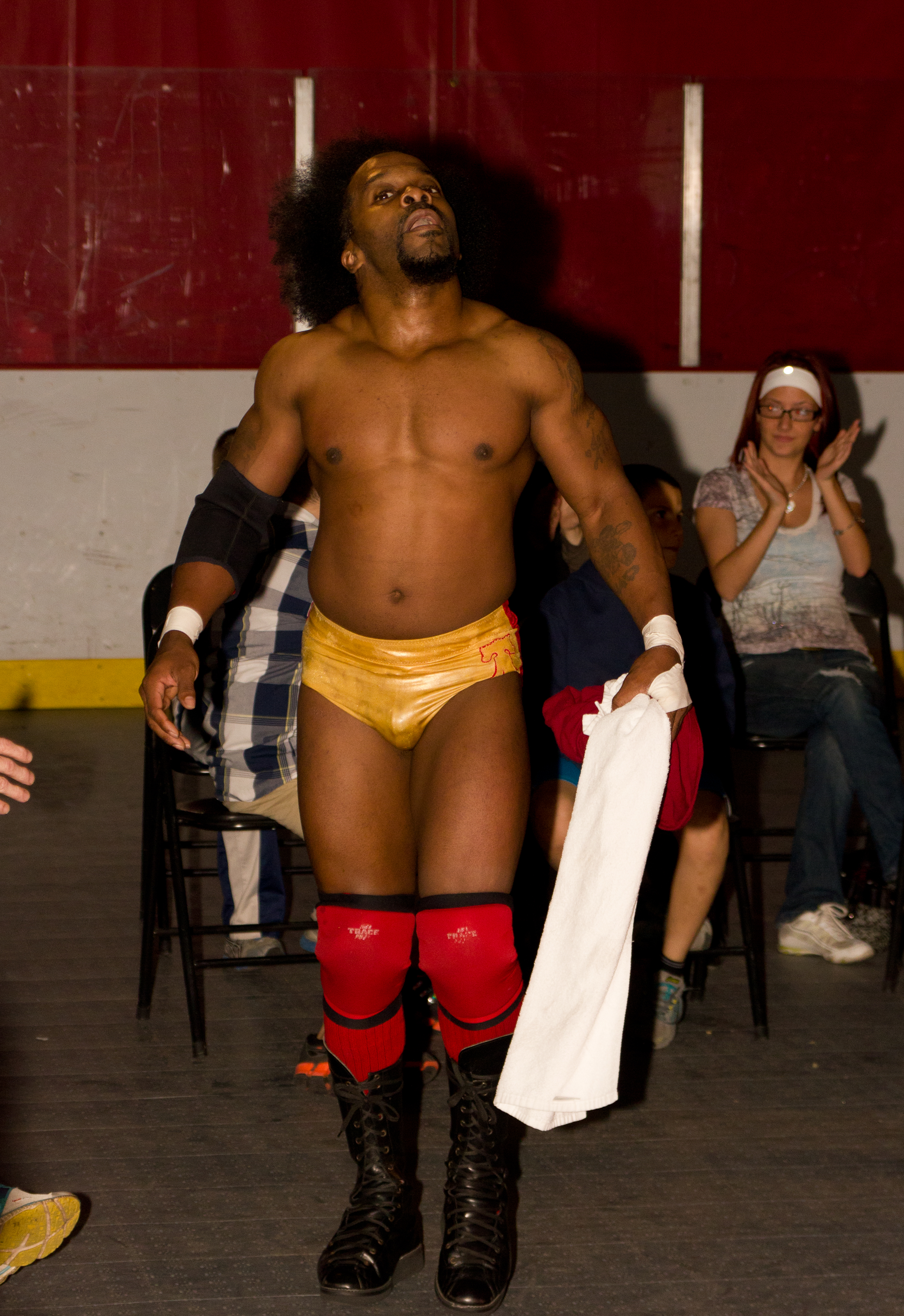
- Sabian, as BLK Jeez, exiting the ring at a SCW show in September 2012

Personal information
- Born: Darnell Kittrell; April 25, 1975 (age 51) Philadelphia, Pennsylvania

Professional wrestling career
- Ring name(s): Sabian; Spade-O; BLK Jeez; Jared Wachtler; Rashad Cameron
- Billed height: 5 ft 7 in (1.70 m)
- Billed weight: 175 lb (79 kg) "A Brick and a Half"
- Billed from: Philadelphia, Pennsylvania; West Philly
- Trained by: Charles Gregory; Jerry Schaffer
- Debut: February 26, 2000

Darnell Kittrell (born April 25, 1975) is an American professional wrestler. He performs for the National Wrestling Alliance under the ring name BLK Jeez (pronounced "Black Jeez").

== Professional wrestling career ==
=== Debut (2000–2003) ===
After completing his training, Kittrell made his professional wrestling debut on February 26, 2000, under the ring name Sabian. He then won his first championship, the Hybrid Pro Wrestling Junior Heavyweight Championship, only six months later by defeating Insayashi.

=== Combat Zone Wrestling ===
==== Debut and The Blackout (2004–2005) ====
After wrestling on the independent circuit for three years, Sabian made his Combat Zone Wrestling debut on May 4, 2004, with a victory over Sean Bishop. On June 12, Sabian joined Ruckus to form the Blackout, or BLKOUT, as they defeated Derek Frazier and Chri$ Ca$h to earn an opportunity at the World Tag Team Championship, which they then won from the H8 Club (Nick Gage and Nate Hatred) later on in the night. On August 14, Eddie Kingston joined the Blackout as they defeated Gage, Hatred and Ca$h. On September 11, the Blackout retained their title against The S.A.T. during the day show while wrestling the H8 Club to a no contest during the night show.

On December 11, the Blackout (Sabian, Ruckus, Kingston and new member Jack Evans) lost the World Tag Team Title in a Cage of Death to rival Chri$ Ca$h and his allies J. C. Bailey, Nate Webb and SeXXXy Eddy. Despite the title loss, Sabian managed to defeat Mike Quackenbush on April 2, 2005, to win the World Junior Heavyweight Championship, his first CZW singles title. Sabian would go on to hold the title until June 11, when he re-lost the title to Quackenbush in a match involving B-Boy. On July 9, the Blackout defeated B-Boy and their rivals SeXXXy Eddy and Nate Webb. On October 8, Sabian was unsuccessful in regaining the World Junior Heavyweight Title in a match involving the champion Derek Frazier, Heretic, Niles Young and Mike Quackenbush.

==== Feud with the Kings of Wrestling (2005–2007) ====
On December 10, Sabian and Eddie Kingston lost to The Kings of Wrestling (Claudio Castagnoli and Chris Hero) in a match for the Kings' World Tag Team Title.

Beginning in 2006, the Blackout gained revenge against the Kings by defeating them and Super Dragon on January 14 in a six-man tag team match. Less than a month later on February 11, Sabian won a gauntlet match to earn a shot the World Junior Heavyweight Title. Later in the night, Sabian faced Frazier for the title, but the match ended in a no-contest, resulting in the title being vacated. On March 11, Sabian was again unsuccessful in his bid for the title as Niles Young defeated him, Heretic, Cheech and Cloudy to win the title. On May 13, both Sabian and Ruckus entered the sixth annual Best of the Best tournament. After he and Matt Sydal defeated Sonjay Dutt in the first round, Sabian defeated Sydal in the quarterfinals to advance to the finals, where he faced Austin Aries, Claudio Castagnoli and fellow Blackout teammate and World Heavyweight Championship Ruckus, who defended the title earlier in the event twice. Ruckus managed to defeat Sabian, Aries and Castagnoli to retain his title for the third time that night and thus win the Best of the Best tournament. However, shortly after winning the tournament and retaining his title, Ruckus was challenged to an impromptu match by Chris Hero, one half of the Blackout's rivals the Kings of Wrestling, who defeated him for the title.

Despite the title loss, the Blackout recovered as Sabian and new member Robbie Mireno defeated the Kings of Wrestling for the World Tag Team Title. Less than a month later on December 11, the Blackout lost the title to Onyx and Rainman, who proclaimed that they were the "original" Blackout. In response, Sabian teamed up with Ruckus instead of Merino and the Blackout defeated Onyx and Rainman on January 13 to reclaim the title. Over the next few months, the Blackout defeated several other teams in non-title matches before losing to Team AnDrew (Andy Sumner and Drew Gulak) in a non-title match on June 9. Team AnDrew continued their pursuit of the World Tag Team Title, even going to the point of interfering in a match between the Blackout and Niles Young and Derek Frazier on September 8. Later on in the night, Team AnDrew defeated both the Blackout and Young and Frazier for the World Tag Team Title. The feud between the Blackout and Team AnDrew expanded to include Young and Frazier and it intensified even further after Young defeated Sabian and Gulak in a three-way match on September 15. On October 13, Sabian defeated Cloudy before defeating Danny Havoc later on in the night to win the World Junior Heavyweight Title for the second time.

==== World Junior Heavyweight Champion (2007–2010) ====
After winning the title, Sabian began a small feud with female wrestler LuFisto. On November 10, Sabian retained his title against LuFisto. On December 8, the BLKOUT was banned from ringside during Sabian's title rematch with LuFisto. After Sabian again retained his title, SeXXXy Eddy struck LuFisto with a steel chair and in response, Sabian attacked Eddy and hugged LuFisto as a sign of respect. On January 12, 2008, Sabian retained the World Junior Heavyweight Title after defeating Azrieal. On May 10, Sabian won the eighth annual Best of the Best tournament after defeating Drake Younger, Bruce Maxwell and TJ Cannon in the first round, rival Drew Gulak in the quarterfinals and Chuck Taylor in the finals. Despite winning the tournament, Sabian would go on to lose the World Junior Heavyweight Title to Taylor in a title match shortly after the tournament. On October 11, Sabian and Ruckus defeated 2 Girls 1 Cup (Greg Excellent and Beef Wellington) to win their third World Tag Team Championship. On November 8, Sabian and Ruckus lost the title back to 2 Girls 1 Cup.

Beginning in 2009, Sabian made only sporadic appearances in CZW due to competing throughout the independent circuit and overseas for International Pro Wrestling: United Kingdom. On June 13, Sabian was eliminated in the first round of ninth annual Best of the Best tournament by Shiima Xion. Following this, Sabian would team with fellow BLKOUT members to compete for the World Tag Team Championship on a few occasions, but was unsuccessful in reclaiming the title. On February 13, 2010, Sabian won a six-way match to regain the World Junior Heavyweight Championship. Exactly a month later, he retained the title against Adam Cole after their match ended in a draw. On May 8, Sabian lost the title to Cole in a three-way match that also involved fellow BLKOUT member Ruckus.

==== BLK Jeez (2010–present) ====
On September 10, Sabian changed his ring name to BLK Jeez and later faced Cole in a rematch for the World Junior Heavyweight Championship, but was unsuccessful. On December 11, BLK Jeez and Joker formed Philly's Most Wanted and proceeded to defeat The Osirian Portal (Amasis and Ophidian) to win the vacant World Tag Team Championship.

On February 12, 2011, Philly's Most Wanted lost the World Tag Team Title to The Briscoe Brothers. Exactly a month later, BLK Jeez defeated Jay Briscoe before taking a hiatus from CZW in order to tour with Big Japan Pro Wrestling. Upon BLK Jeez's return to CZW in April, Philly's Most Wanted continued their feud with the Briscoes by competing in a six-man tag team match that included Devon Moore and Robert Anthony with both the World Tag Team and World Heavyweight Championships on the line. Ultimately, the Briscoes and Moore won the match, resulting in the Briscoes retaining their World Tag Team Title and Moore winning Anthony's World Heavyweight Title. Despite this, Philly's Most Wanted defeated Mark Briscoe on May 14 in a handicap match to win the World Tag Team Title and end the feud. On August 13, BLK Jeez faced Moore in a lumberjack strap match for the World Heavyweight Championship, but was defeated. On November 12, Philly's Most Wanted lost the World Tag Team Championship to Bandido Jr. and Azrieal.

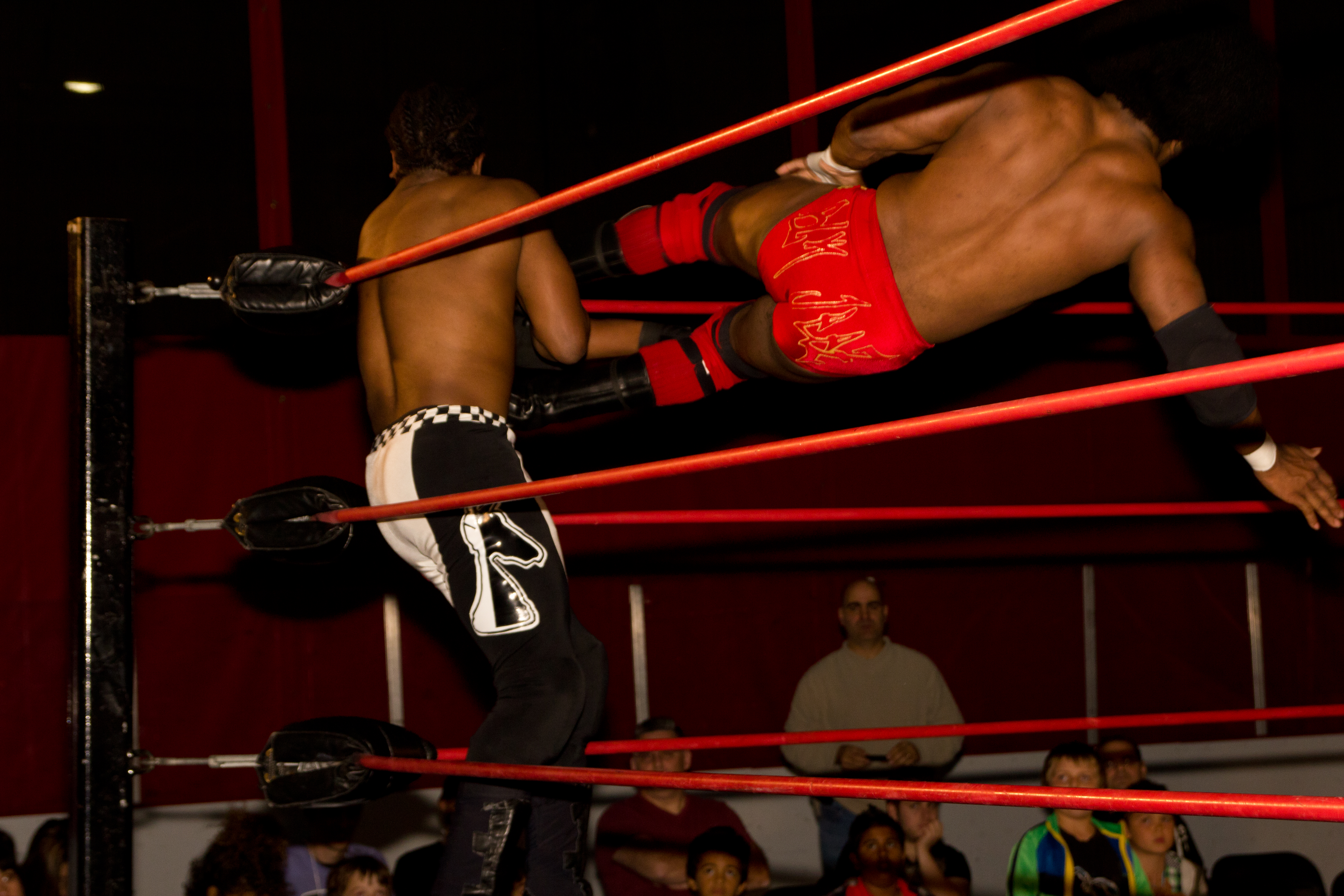
BLK Jeez performing a dropkick on Lionel Knight

Following the title loss, BLK Jeez took another hiatus from CZW in order to perform another tour with BJW. He made his return to CZW on February 18, 2012, with a victory over Homicide. On May 12, BLK Jeez challenged Drake Younger for the World Junior Heavyweight Championship, but was unsuccessful in reclaiming the title. After Joker retired from wrestling in September, BLK Jeez reunited with Ruckus to reform the Blackout as a tag team. The Blackout had their return match in CZW on November 10, where they and the team of Human Tornado and Toby Klein were unsuccessful in winning the World Tag Team Championship from the defending champions 4-Loco (Azrieal and Bandido Jr.). On December 8 at Cage of Death XIV, the Blackout wrestled against Ohio Is For Killers (Dave and Jake Crist) to determine the number one contenders for the World Tag Team Title, but the match ended in a no contest.

On April 5, 2013, the Blackout defeated The Catalyst (Dustin Rayz and Eric Ryan) to win the World Tag Team Championship.

On December 13, 2014, at Cage of Death, Jeez defeated Biff Busick, Drew Gulak and Sozio in a Cage of Death match to win the CZW World Heavyweight Championship and in early 2015 BLK Jeez Became a heel and aligned himself with Pepper Parks and His Wife Cherry Bomb, The Stable was named TV Ready And Jeez successfully defended his championship against Tournament of Death 2015 winner Matt Tremont at New Heights on July 11, 2015. On August 8, the next month, Tremont defeated Pepper Parks in a street fight and would go on to challenge Jeez for the championship in the main event of the show in which Tremont came out victorious.

=== Chikara (2005–2007) ===
On February 18, 2005, Sabian teamed up with Chikara wrestler Jigsaw as they entered the 2005 Tag World Grand Prix. After defeating Rorschach and Ravage in the first round, The Ring Crew Express (Dunn and Marcos) in the second round and Mad Man Pondo and Necro Butcher (the latter via disqualification) in the third round, Sabian and Jigsaw lost to Claudio Castagnoli and Arik Cannon, who would later go on to win the tournament. On March 18, Sabian teamed up with Jigsaw and Mike Quackenbush in a losing effort to the Kings of Wrestling (Castagnoli, Cannon and Chris Hero). The following day, Sabian made his Chikara singles debut in a loss to former ally Jigsaw. Sabian continued his singles run as he defeated Dr. Cheung in the first round of the Young Lions Cup before losing a six-way semi-finals match to Icarus also involving Cannon, Mickie Knuckles, Ricky Reyes and Rorschach. On July 24, Sabian gained revenge against the Kings as he, Eddie Kingston, Quackenbush and Equinox defeated the Kings and Team F.I.S.T. member Gran Akuma.

Sabian returned to Chikara one year later on February 25, where he and Eddie Kingston defeated Ian Rotten and Mickie Knuckles in the first round of Chikara's tag team tournament before defeating Joker and Necro Butcher in the second round. Sabian and Kingston later lost to Team F.I.S.T. (Icarus and Gran Akuma) in the third round.

In 2007, Sabian made more frequent appearances in Chikara, the first of which was a match in the first-ever King of Trios as the Blackout (Sabian, Joker and Ruckus) lost to Team TNA (Sonjay Dutt and The Motor City Machineguns) on February 17. On March 23, Sabian and Joker lost to 2.0 (Jagged and Shane Matthews) and the following day, Sabian, Kingston, Ruckus and Joker lost to Hallowicked and The Colony. On June 24, Sabian made his last appearance in Chikara, as he and Ruckus defeated The Colony in a tag team match.

=== WWE (2012) ===
On the June 22, 2012, episode of SmackDown, Kittrell made his WWE debut under the ring name Jared Wachtler as he and Frank Venezia lost to Ryback in a two-on-one handicap match.

=== Total Nonstop Action Wrestling (2012–2013) ===
On the June 28, 2012, episode of Impact Wrestling, Kittrell made his Total Nonstop Action Wrestling debut under the ring name Rashad Cameron, where he defeated Mason Andrews in an X Division Championship tournament qualifying match. On July 8 at Destination X, Cameron was eliminated from the tournament by Sonjay Dutt. Kittrell, once again under Rashad Cameron ring name, made another appearance for TNA on the July 26 episode of Impact Wrestling, vying for a shot at the X Division Championship. However, World Heavyweight Champion Austin Aries opted not to grant him the shot and instead eliminated him from contention. Kittrell, once again working as Rashad Cameron, returned to TNA on January 12, 2013, to take part in the tapings of the One Night Only: X-Travaganza special, wrestling in a tag team match where he and Anthony Nese were defeated by Douglas Williams and Kid Kash.

== Championships and accomplishments ==
- American Championship Pro Wrestling
  - ACPW Junior Heavyweight Championship (2 times)
- Catalyst Wrestling
  - Catalyst Wrestling Tag Team Championship (1 time) - with The Tri State Saints (Boom Harden, Dominick Denaro, Joker & Steve Mack)
- Combat Zone Wrestling
  - CZW World Heavyweight Championship (1 time)
  - CZW World Junior Heavyweight Championship (3 times)
  - CZW World Tag Team Championship (9 times) – with Ruckus (5), Robbie Mireno (1), Joker (2), and Pepper Parks (1)
  - Best of the Best 8
  - Eighth Triple Crown Champion
- Dangerously Intense Wrestling
  - DIW Cruiserweight Championship (1 time)
- Eastern Wrestling Alliance
  - EWA Cruiserweight Championship (1 time)
- Extreme Rising
  - Extreme Rising Match of the Year (2012) vs. The Briscoe Brothers vs. Dramáticos
- Hybrid Pro Wrestling
  - HPW Junior Heavyweight Championship (1 time)
- Jersey All Pro Wrestling
  - JAPW Heavyweight Championship (1 time, final)
  - JAPW Light Heavyweight Championship (1 time)
- Maryland Championship Wrestling
  - MCW Cruiserweight Championship (1 time)
  - MCW Tag Team Championship (1 time) – with Ruckus
- Maven Bentley Association
  - MBA Tag Team Championship (1 time) – with Eddie Kingston
- Pro Wrestling Illustrated
  - Ranked No. 247 of the top 500 wrestlers in the PWI 500 in 2013
- SuperKrazee Pro Wrestling
  - SuperKrazee Heavyweight Championship (2 times)
- UWA Hardcore Wrestling
  - UWA Light Heavyweight Championship (1 time)
  - UWA Tag Team Championship(1 time) – with Joker
- World Wrestling Council (New Jersey)
  - WWC Cruiserweight Championship (1 time)
- World Xtreme Wrestling
  - WXW Ultimate Heavyweight Championship (1 time)
  - WXW Cruiserweight Championship (1 time)
  - WXW Elite Tag Team Championship (1 time) – with Devon Moore
