= Beaver Boys =

Professional wrestling team

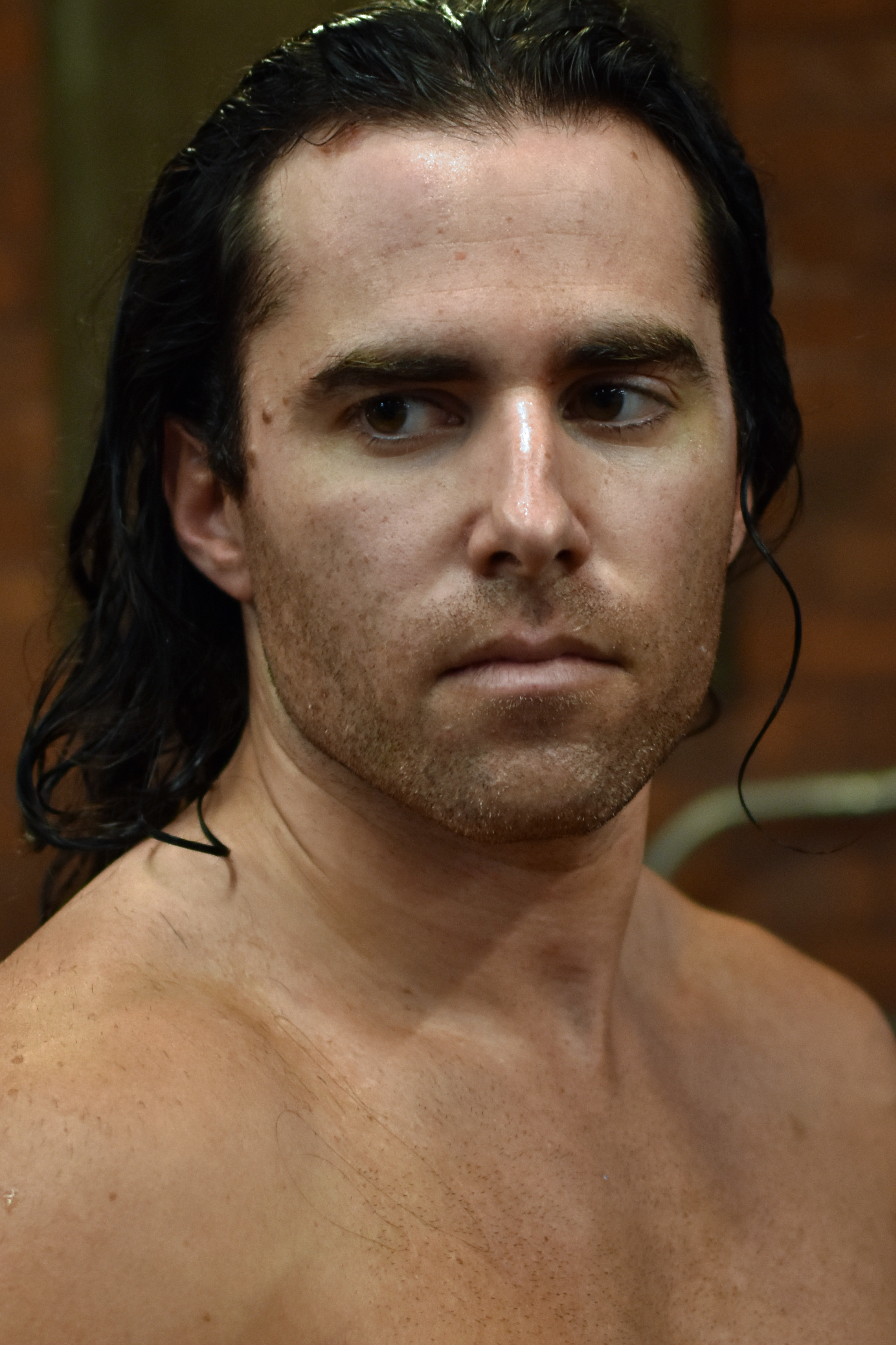
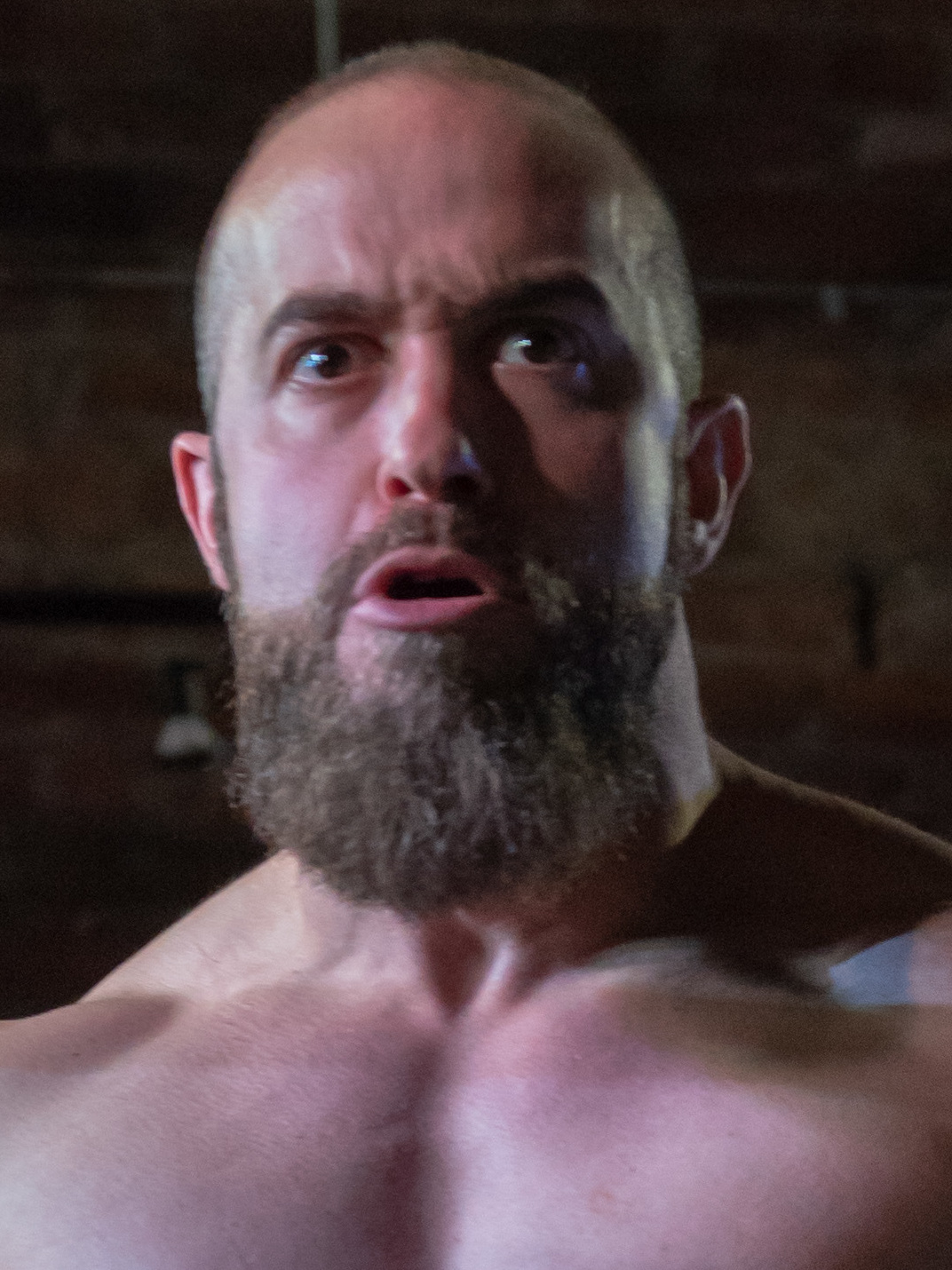
- Reynolds (left) and Silver (right)

Statistics
- Members: Alex Reynolds / Alex Keaton; John Silver / Johnny Silver
- Name(s): Slophunters; The Beaver Boys; Alex Reynolds and John Silver; Alex Keaton and Johnny Silver
- Billed heights: Alex: 5 ft 11 in (180 cm); John: 5 ft 5 in (165cm)
- Combined billed weight: Combined: 374 lbs (170 kg); Alex: 196 lbs (89 kg); John: 178 lbs (81 kg)
- Hometown: Long Island, New York, U.S.
- Billed from: Long Island, New York
- Debut: August 18, 2011
- Years active: 2011-present
- Trained by: Mikey Whipwreck

Alex Reynolds and John Silver, formerly known as the Beaver Boys, are an American professional wrestling tag team. They are signed to All Elite Wrestling (AEW) as members of The Dark Order. They are also known for their appearances in Combat Zone Wrestling, Evolve Wrestling and Pro Wrestling Guerrilla.

== History ==
=== Independent circuit (2011–2019) ===
Reynolds and Silver made their debut as a tag team in August 2011 for New York Wrestling Connection defeating Stockade and Apollyon. In January 2012, Reynolds and Silver made their debut for EVOLVE at EVOLVE 10 where they were defeated by Scott Reed and Caleb Konley.

=== WWE (2019) ===
The Beaver Boys, billed as Alex Keaton and Johnny Silver, lost to Heavy Machinery (Otis and Tucker) in a squash match on the September 10, 2019 edition of Smackdown at Madison Square Garden.

=== All Elite Wrestling (2019–present) ===
Reynolds and Silver made their All Elite Wrestling debut on the third episode of AEW Dynamite as enhancement talent losing to Santana and Ortiz. Over the following months vignettes aired of Silver and Reynolds getting recruitment messages from The Dark Order- eventually resulting in Reynolds and Silver joining the Dark Order as henchmen, thus establishing themselves as villains. In December 2019, it was revealed that Reynolds and Silver had signed with All Elite Wrestling. In August, it was revealed that Reynolds and Silver had signed long-term contracts.

== Championships and accomplishments ==
- Beyond Wrestling
  - Tournament For Tomorrow (2018)
- Combat Zone Wrestling
  - CZW World Tag Team Championship (1 time)
- Five Borough Wrestling
  - FBW Tag Team Tournament (2014)
- New York Wrestling Connection
  - NYWC Tag Team Championship (1 time)
- Pro Wrestling Guerrilla
  - PWG World Tag Team Championship (1 time)
- Pro Wrestling Illustrated
  - Ranked John Silver No. 247. of the top 500 singles wrestlers in the PWI 500 in 2021.
  - Ranked Alex Reynolds No. 312. of the top 500 singles wrestlers in the PWI 500 in 2020.
