= Monsta Mack =

American professional wrestler (born 1979)

Personal information
- Born: Stephen Carrasquillo; May 3, 1979 (age 47) Brooklyn, New York

Professional wrestling career
- Ring name(s): Monsta Mack; Steve Mack
- Billed height: 5 ft 9 in (1.75 m)
- Billed weight: 281 lb (127 kg)
- Billed from: Bed-Stuy "Do or Die" Brooklyn
- Trained by: Homicide; Manny Fernandez; Magic
- Debut: October 1998

Stephen Carrasquillo (born May 3, 1979) is an American professional wrestler better known as Monsta Mack. He is perhaps best known for his stint in Ring of Honor with Dan "Mafia" Maff as the tag team Da Hit Squad. Mack performs on the independent circuit, most prominently for Jersey All Pro Wrestling, where he works as both a wrestler and a commentator.

== Professional wrestling career ==
After receiving training from Homicide, Manny Fernandez and Magic, Mack began his wrestling career by joining the Long Island Wrestling Federation as Steve Mack, where he made his debut in a four-way elimination match against Low Ki, Chief Tango, and Ken Sweeney for the LIWF's benefit show towards the Junkyard Dog Memorial Fund.

=== Jersey All Pro Wrestling and Da Hit Squad ===
Upon making his way to Jersey All Pro Wrestling, Mack, now renamed to Monsta Mack, began teaming with Mafia and both men collectively formed a heel tag team called Da Hit Squad. The team had an immediate impact, as they won their first of five JAPW Tag Team Championships in 1999 while feuding with the likes of The Haas Brothers (Russ and Charlie) as well as the Shane Twins. Soon after in 2000, Da Hit Squad continued to accumulate several championships in several other independent promotions and by 2001, they held a total of six titles between them. By 2002, they became one of the most dominant tag teams in New Jersey, New York and Pennsylvania.

On February 22, 2003, in Woodbridge, New Jersey, Mafia defeated Homicide for his first JAPW Heavyweight Championship. Following his victory, Mafia became a face by leaving Mack, who he then defeated in a match for USA Pro Wrestling on March 8. However, Mafia would soon return to being a heel following a successful title defense against Slyk Wagner Brown as he renamed himself Dan Maff and formed a stable with the Dirty Rotten Scoundrelz known as La Familia (not to be confused with the World Wrestling Entertainment stable of the same name).

On February 28, 2004, Mack challenged Maff for the JAPW Heavyweight Championship. After Maff successfully retained the title, the former Squad members embraced after the match in a show of respect and friendship. However, the Scoundrelz were disgusted by the show of sportsmanship and attacked Maff as he tried to leave the ring. In response, Mack returned to the ring to help Maff but instead he assisted the Scoundrelz with their assault on Maff. Mack then formed a new version of La Familia with the Soundrelz, and enlisted a number of other heels to try to take the title away from Maff to no avail.

=== Ring of Honor (2002–2004) ===
Mack, along with Mafia, were in the first match in Ring of Honor, when they faced the Christopher Street Connection at The Era of Honor Begins, squashing them in only a few minutes. Over the next few ROH shows, Da Hit Squad began establishing themselves as a dominant force as they had been in JAPW, winning several squash matches before later feuding with teams such as The Carnage Crew and the Natural Born Sinners. The Carnage Crew wanted to prove that they were the hardest hitting team in ROH, so the two teams engaged in a series of hardcore matches. At Honor Invades Boston, Da Hit Squad defeated The Carnage Crew in a "Boston Massacre Match", which featured chairs, hubcaps, and barbed wire boards. At the next show, before a match between Da Hit Squad and the Natural Born Sinners could take place, The Carnage Crew came to the ring and attacked both teams. In response, Da Hit Squad faced the Crew in a falls count anywhere match at ROH's biggest show, Glory By Honor, which the Crew won after they performed their Carnage Driver from the stage onto a table, ending the feud. Following their feud with the Crew, the Squad took part in a series of scramble matches over the next few months.

Da Hit Squad would later have their last match together at the Round Robin Challenge II against the Second City Saints. Following the match, Mafia joined The Prophecy and attacked Mack, ending the team. After the Squad's dissolution, Mack left ROH to return to JAPW full-time.

=== Return to JAPW (2005–2018) ===
Following his tenure in ROH, Mack returned to JAPW on September 10, 2005 with a win over Bandito, Jr. Upon finishing up 2005 and entering 2006, Mack competed in several singles matches and started a feud with Trent Acid, as well as forming a tag team called the Heavy Hitters with new partner Havoc. On July 29, 2006, Mack won a battle royal to earn a title match against then-Heavyweight Champion Rhino. However, Mack was unsuccessful in winning the title belt after he was pinned by Rhino following a Gore through a wooden door. On September 15, Mack was granted a rematch against Rhino for the title, but he once again lost. In 2007, Mack took the summer off to rest and recuperate a knee injury before returning to the ring on July 21, 2007 with a victory alongside Havoc after they beat Wes Draven and Pinkie Sanchez. The Heavy Hitters then began a winning streak throughout the end of 2007 and into 2008, defeating several teams such as The Christopher Street Connection and The Gemini Twins en route to becoming contenders for the Tag Team Championship. On May 31, 2008, the Heavy Hitters were unable to win the title from then-champions The Latin American Xchange. The Hitters rebounded with a victory on August 16 over The Nigerian Nightmares and again faced LAX for the title one month later, but were again unable to win. After their second title match loss, the Hitters again defeated The Nigerian Nightmares before going undefeated once again throughout the rest of 2008 and into early 2009. On June 27, the Hitters lost a four-way match to The Garden State Gods (Corvis Fear and Myke Quest), also involving the Voodoo Kin Mafia and DNA (Sonjay Dutt and Azrieal), for the Tag Team Title. On January 23, 2010, the Heavy Hitters defeated The H8 Club (Nick Gage and Nate Hatred) and the Tag Team Champions The Hillbilly Wrecking Crew (Necro Butcher and Brodie Lee) to win the Tag Team Title. As a result of the win, Mack tied the record with Homicide for the most reigns as Tag Team Champion. Mack and Havok lost the titles on October 23, 2010, to Sami Callihan and Chris Dickinson in a three-way match, which also included Axl Rotten and Balls Mahoney. On December 10 Mack and Dan Maff won the titles from Callihan and Dickinson, marking the start of Mack's record breaking seventh JAPW Tag Team Championship reign. The two would, however, lose the titles to Necro Butcher and Nick Gage the next day.

== Championships and accomplishments ==
- Beyond Wrestling
  - Tournament For Tomorrow 4 Tag Team (2015) – with Dan Maff
- Bronx Wrestling Federation
  - BWF NYC Championship (1 time)
- Catalyst Wrestling
  - Catalyst Wrestling Tag Team Championship (1 time) - Boom Harden
- Combat Zone Wrestling
  - CZW World Tag Team Championship (1 time) – with Dan Maff
- Game Changer Wrestling
  - GCW Tag Team Championship (3 times) - with Dan Maff (2) & Kyle The Beast (1)
- Impact Championship Wrestling
  - ICW Tag Team Championship (1 time) – with Mafia
- Intense Entertainment Wrestling
  - IEW Heavyweight Championship (1 time)
- Jersey All Pro Wrestling
  - JAPW Tag Team Championship (7 times) – with Mafia (6) and Havok (1)
  - JAPW Hall of Fame (2016)
- Jersey Championship Wrestling
  - JCW Tag Team Championships (1 time) – with Mafia
  - Jersey J-Cup (2015)
- Pro Wrestling Illustrated
  - PWI ranked him #265 of the top 500 singles wrestlers in the PWI 500 in 2003
- Superstars Of Wrestling Federation
  - SWF Tag Team Championship (1 time) - MAGIC
- Titan Championship Wrestling
  - TCW Heavyweight Championship (1 time)
- USA Pro Wrestling / USA Xtreme Wrestling
  - USA Pro/USX Tag Team Championship (4 times) – with Mafia (2), Havok (1) and Louie Ramos (1)
- World Xtreme Wrestling
  - WXW Tag Team Championship (2 times) – with Mafia
  - Samoan Legacy Cup Tournament (2016)
- Long Island Wrestling Federation
  - LIWF Tag Team Championship (2 times) – with Homicide (1) and Mafia (1)
