= Shelton Benjamin =

American professional wrestler (born 1975)

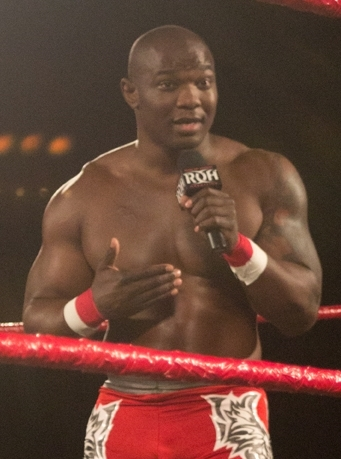
- Benjamin in 2013

Personal information
- Born: Shelton James Benjamin; July 9, 1975 (age 51) Orangeburg, South Carolina, U.S.
- Education: Lassen Community College; University of Minnesota
- Children: 2

Professional wrestling career
- Ring name(s): Shelton Benjamin; Shelton X Benjamin
- Billed height: 6 ft 2 in (188 cm)
- Billed weight: 248 lb (112 kg)
- Billed from: Minneapolis, Minnesota; Orangeburg, South Carolina
- Trained by: Danny Davis; Dean Malenko; Doug Basham; Fit Finlay
- Debut: January 10, 2000
- Sports career
Medal record
Collegiate Wrestling
Representing Lassen CC
NJCAA Championships
Gold medal – first place	1996 Bismark	275 lb
Bronze medal – third place	1995 Bismark	275 lb
Representing the Minnesota Golden Gophers
NCAA Division I Championships
Bronze medal – third place	1998 Cleveland	275 lb

Shelton James Benjamin (born July 9, 1975) is an American professional wrestler and former amateur wrestler. As of October 2024, he is signed to All Elite Wrestling (AEW), where he is a member of The Hurt Syndicate stable.

Prior to becoming a professional wrestler, Benjamin was a two-sport athlete in college, having won an NJCAA championship in both track and field and collegiate wrestling. After attending junior college, he completed his degree from the University of Minnesota.

Benjamin started his professional wrestling career in WWE's developmental territory Ohio Valley Wrestling (OVW), where he held the OVW Southern Tag Team Championship four times. WWE then moved him to the main roster in 2002, where he formed an alliance with Kurt Angle and Charlie Haas, known as Team Angle, and later, The World's Greatest Tag Team with Haas. During his first tenure with the company, he won the WWE Intercontinental Championship three times, with his first title reign lasting 244 days, the longest reign in this century until 2023, the WWE United States Championship once, and the WWE Tag Team Championship two times with Haas. He was released from WWE in April 2010, and began performing for ROH, where he reunited with Charlie Haas and went on to win the ROH World Tag Team Championship twice. He made his New Japan Pro-Wrestling (NJPW) debut in 2012 as Shelton X Benjamin., and appeared in Pro Wrestling Noah in 2015, both as a member of Suzuki-gun. He returned to WWE in August 2017 and would go on to join The Hurt Business in July 2020 along with MVP and Bobby Lashley. He won the renamed WWE Raw Tag Team Championship a third time with Cedric Alexander, and the WWE 24/7 Championship three times. He was released again in September 2023, returning to the independent circuit. He made his AEW debut in October 2024, reuniting with MVP and Lashley as The Hurt Syndicate. He is a former one-time AEW World Tag Team Champion with Lashley.

== Amateur wrestling ==
Benjamin was born and raised in Orangeburg, South Carolina. He began wrestling his sophomore year at Orangeburg-Wilkinson High School. Benjamin recorded a 122–10 overall win–loss record in his high school wrestling career and was a two-time 4A SCHSL wrestling state champion at heavyweight, winning in 1993 and 1994.

Benjamin then attended Lassen Community College in Susanville, California, winning National Junior College Athletic Association (NJCAA) championships in wrestling and 100 meters. After his freshman year at Lassen, he briefly went to North Carolina State University on a football scholarship in 1995, before returning to Lassen to finish out his sophomore year.

He then transferred to the University of Minnesota on a wrestling scholarship for his junior and senior years of college. He achieved All-American status twice in wrestling, placing fifth in the heavyweight division of the NCAA Championships in 1997, then improving to third place in 1998. After graduation, he served as an assistant wrestling coach at his alma mater and trained future Ohio Valley Wrestling (OVW) tag team partner Brock Lesnar. Benjamin thought about trying to qualify for the 2000 Summer Olympics but decided instead to pursue a professional wrestling career.

== Professional wrestling career ==
=== World Wrestling Federation/World Wrestling Entertainment (2000–2010) ===
==== Ohio Valley Wrestling (2000–2002) ====
On January 10, 2000, Benjamin signed a contract with the World Wrestling Federation (WWF) and was placed in its developmental territory Ohio Valley Wrestling (OVW). OVW booker Jim Cornette paired Benjamin with his former college roommate Brock Lesnar after he felt Lesnar was "boring" as a wrestler and had "no personality", while Benjamin was "exciting". Together, they were known as the "Minnesota Stretching Crew," and they held the OVW Southern Tag Team Championship on three occasions. The first two reigns occurred during February and July 2001. They won the title for a third time from Rico Constantino and The Prototype on October 29, 2001. After Lesnar was called up to the main roster in November 2001, Benjamin formed a tag team with Redd Dogg Begnaud called "The Dogg Pound" and once again won the OVW Southern Tag Team Championship on July 17, 2002. Benjamin then wrestled at several house shows for the main WWE roster and eventually made his WWE television debut on Sunday Night Heat as a face on July 29 defeating Justin Credible. A week later he defeated Shawn Stasiak on Heat. He was taken off WWE television that September and returned to OVW.

==== Team Angle/World's Greatest Tag Team (2002–2004) ====
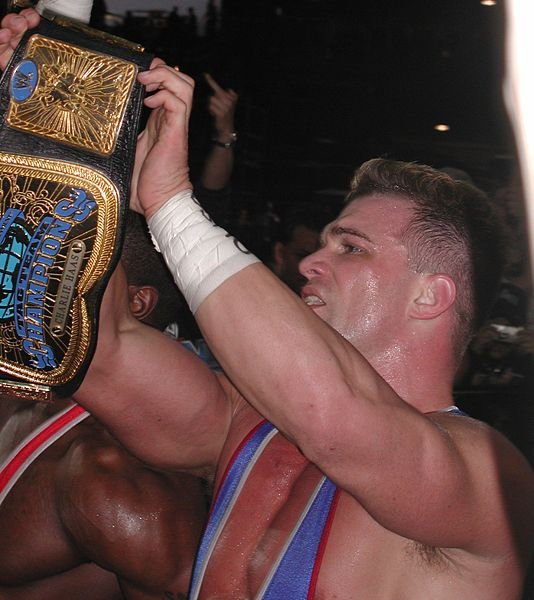
Benjamin (left) with Charlie Haas (right) holding the WWE Tag Team Championship belt

Benjamin joined WWE's SmackDown! brand on the December 26, 2002, episode of SmackDown!, forming an alliance with Charlie Haas with Olympic gold-medalist Kurt Angle as their mentor known as "Team Angle". Their first televised match together in WWE was on the January 2, 2003, episode of SmackDown! against Edge and Chris Benoit.

The duo won the WWE Tag Team Championship just a month after their debut by defeating the champions, Los Guerreros (Eddie and Chavo) on the February 6 episode of SmackDown!. They continued their feud with Benoit until No Way Out on February 23, when Benoit teamed with Brock Lesnar to defeat Team Angle. The two then went on to compete in their first WrestleMania match at WrestleMania XIX on March 30, retaining the WWE Tag Team Championship in a Triple Threat match against Los Guerreros, and Chris Benoit and Rhyno. Team Angle later lost the WWE Tag Team Championship to Eddie Guerrero and his new partner Tajiri at Judgment Day on May 18 in a ladder match. The storyline concluded on the June 12 episode of SmackDown!, when Angle confronted Benjamin and Haas and fired them from Team Angle.

After parting ways with Angle, Benjamin and Haas began referring to themselves as the "World's Greatest Tag Team". They won the WWE Tag Team Championship back from Guerrero and Tajiri on the July 3 episode of SmackDown!. They lost the titles to Los Guerreros on the September 18 episode of SmackDown!, after Benjamin suffered a legitimate knee injury during the match. Benjamin was side-lined for approximately one month, but the pair competed together again, taking part in a fatal four way match for the WWE Tag Team Championship at WrestleMania XX on March 14, 2004, that was won by Too Cool.

==== Intercontinental Champion (2004–2006) ====
On the March 22 episode of Raw, Benjamin was drafted to the Raw brand as part of the 2004 WWE draft lottery. After arriving, Benjamin quickly became a face when he scored an upset victory over Triple H. Benjamin then feuded with Triple H, beating him three times in total: once by pinfall, once by countout and once by disqualification. As part of the storyline, Benjamin then feuded with the other members of Triple H's stable Evolution. Benjamin defeated Ric Flair at Backlash on April 18 and lost to Randy Orton in a WWE Intercontinental Championship match at Bad Blood on June 13. During a match with Garrison Cade on the June 20 episode of Heat, Benjamin punched Cade's knee brace, breaking his hand in the process and briefly taking him out of action.

Benjamin returned on the September 13 episode of Raw, helping Randy Orton fight off Evolution. He was later chosen by the fans to compete for the Intercontinental Championship in a match against then-champion Chris Jericho at Taboo Tuesday on October 19. Benjamin won the match, giving him his first singles title in the company. During his reign as Intercontinental Champion, Benjamin retained the title against challengers such as Christian at Survivor Series on November 14, Maven at New Year's Revolution on January 9, 2005, and Chris Jericho at Backlash on May 1. On the May 2 episode of Raw, Benjamin faced Shawn Michaels in the first round of the Gold Rush tournament to determine the number one contender for the World Heavyweight Championship, but lost. Benjamin lost the title to Carlito on the June 20 episode of Raw (Carlito used the ropes during the pinfall), ending the longest Intercontinental Championship reign of that decade and the 21st century overall at 244 days (that record stood until 2023 when it was broken by Gunther).

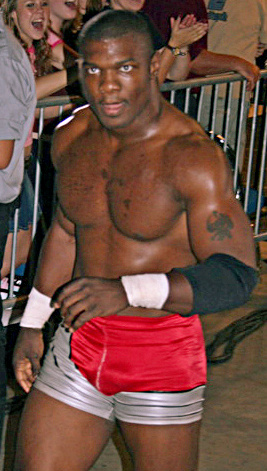
Benjamin in 2005

In late-2005, Benjamin was depicted as having a "losing streak". In January 2006, Benjamin's "Momma" (played by comedian/actress Thea Vidale) coming to Raw to confront Benjamin. Momma slapped and yelled at Benjamin every time he lost a match. Before long, she assisted Benjamin in his matches, often interfering on his behalf. This led to Benjamin turning heel for the second time in his career. Benjamin then began a rivalry with then-Intercontinental Champion Ric Flair. On the February 20 episode of Raw, Benjamin defeated Flair to win his second Intercontinental Championship after Momma faked a heart problem, causing enough of a distraction to allow Benjamin to cheat and win the title. Benjamin continued to feud with Flair, but Momma no longer accompanied him to ringside. Benjamin explained her absence by stating that she was undergoing heart surgery in the hospital. She actually left due to being sexually harassed by someone in WWE.

Benjamin competed in the second Money in the Bank ladder match at WrestleMania 22 on April 2. Benjamin then began a rivalry with Rob Van Dam, the winner of the match, in an attempt to take Van Dam's Money in the Bank contract. During this time, Benjamin emphasized his new heel persona by now wearing shades, jewelry, and occasional colored shirts while entering the ring. At one point, Benjamin was defeated by his former tag team partner, the returning Charlie Haas, on the April 17 episode of Raw. A stipulation added to the match meant that due to this loss, Benjamin had to defend the Intercontinental Championship in the same match as his shot at Van Dam's contract, meaning at Backlash on April 30 it would be a "Winner Takes All" match. Van Dam won at Backlash and became Intercontinental Champion. On the May 15 episode of Raw, Benjamin regained the title from Van Dam in a Tornado Tag Team match, pitting Benjamin, Triple H and Chris Masters against Van Dam and WWE Champion John Cena; both the WWE Championship and WWE Intercontinental Championship could be won by whoever pinned the appropriate champion. Benjamin pinned Van Dam, picking up his third Intercontinental Championship. Subsequently, Benjamin feuded with Carlito and others for his Intercontinental Championship before losing the title to Johnny Nitro in a triple threat match also involving Carlito at Vengeance on June 25.

==== World's Greatest Tag Team reunion (2006–2007) ====
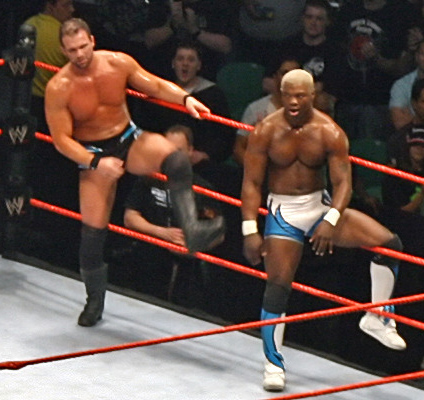
Benjamin (right) and Haas in 2007

On the December 4 episode of Raw, Benjamin's former tag team partner Charlie Haas came out to celebrate with Benjamin after he defeated Super Crazy. On the December 11 episode of Raw, Benjamin announced the World's Greatest Tag Team was officially back in a segment with Cryme Tyme. They defeated The Highlanders in a match later that same night. They then started a feud with Cryme Tyme, but were largely unsuccessful in defeating them, including a tag team turmoil match at New Year's Revolution on January 7, 2007, where they were eliminated by Cryme Tyme. Benjamin entered the Royal Rumble match at the Royal Rumble on January 28, but was eliminated by Shawn Michaels. They finally managed a win over Cryme Tyme, ending their undefeated streak, on the January 29 episode of Raw.

On the April 2 episode of Raw, the World's Greatest Tag Team was unsuccessful in defeating the team of Ric Flair and Carlito, but defeated them in a rematch the following week when Haas distracted Carlito, allowing Benjamin to gain the pin over Flair. They won again two weeks later when Carlito turned on Flair, attacking him and allowing The World's Greatest Tag Team to win via countout. They then challenged The Hardys for the World Tag Team Championship at One Night Stand on June 3 in a ladder match, but were unsuccessful.

In June, the World's Greatest Tag Team began a rivalry with Paul London and Brian Kendrick after losing to the duo in their debut match on the June 18 episode of Raw. A few weeks later, London defeated Benjamin in a singles match, however, on the July 23 episode of Raw, The World's Greatest Tag Team got a tag team win over London and Kendrick to end the rivalry.

In late-2007, Benjamin and Haas then routinely competed against the teams of Hardcore Holly and Cody Rhodes and Super Crazy and Jim Duggan until November, when the team was disbanded due to Benjamin joining the ECW roster.

==== The Gold Standard (2007–2010) ====
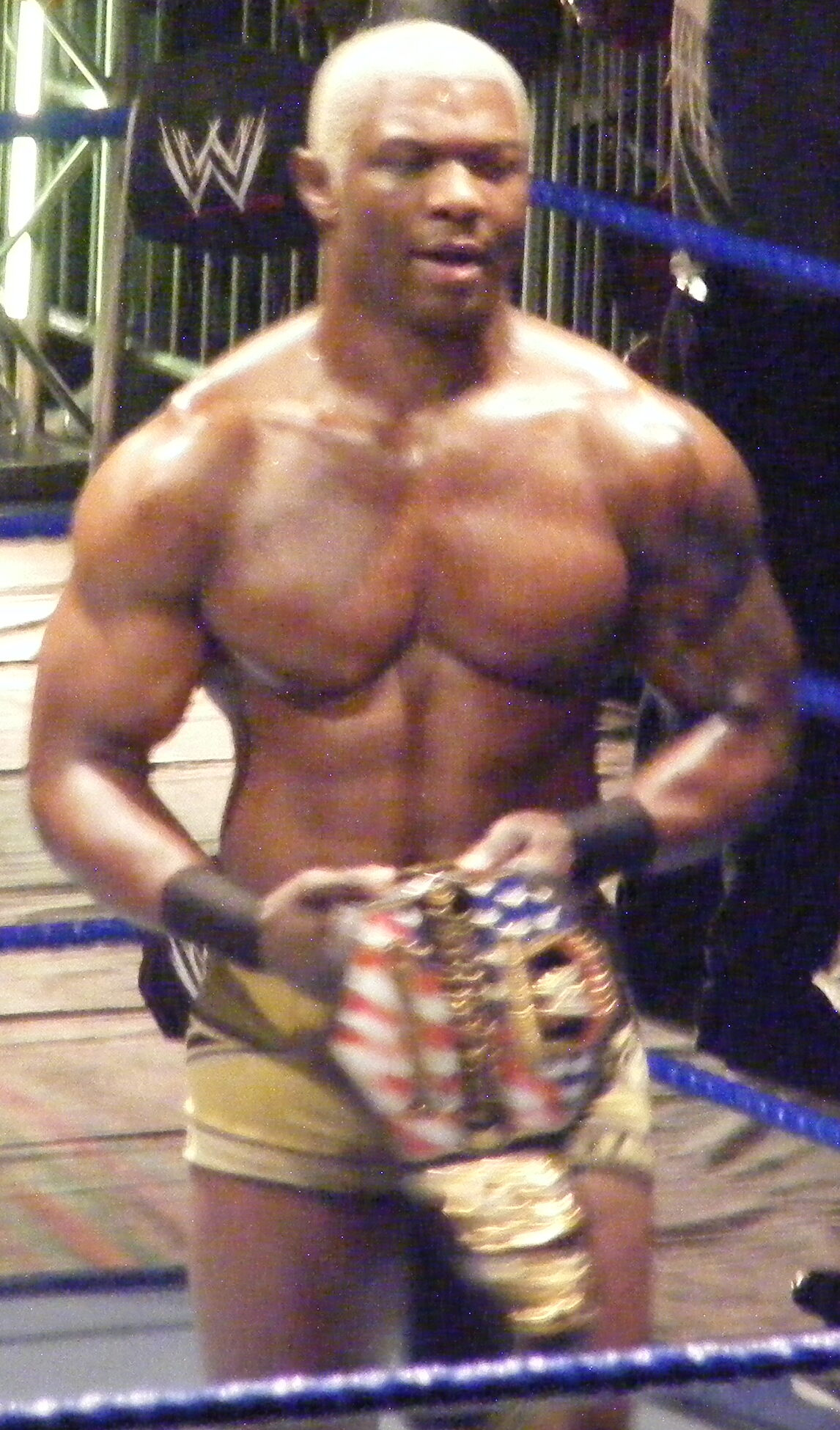
Benjamin as the WWE United States Champion in 2009

On the November 20 episode of ECW, Elijah Burke introduced Benjamin as the newest member of the ECW brand. Benjamin, who had dyed his hair blond before leaving Raw, began wearing gold wrestling attire and referring to himself as "The Gold Standard". On ECW, Benjamin began once again receiving more airtime and higher profile matches, defeating Tommy Dreamer in his debut. Benjamin then qualified for the Royal Rumble match and won an over the top rope preview. On January 27, 2008, Benjamin appeared in the Royal Rumble match at the Royal Rumble, entering at number 17, but was eliminated by Shawn Michaels. He suffered his first loss since coming to ECW to Kane by count-out, on the January 29 episode of ECW. On the February 22 episode of SmackDown, Benjamin defeated Jimmy Wang Yang in a qualifying match for the Money in the Bank ladder match at WrestleMania XXIV on March 30, which was won by CM Punk. After WrestleMania, Benjamin briefly feuded with Punk, before he began an on-screen rivalry with Kofi Kingston, who defeated Benjamin on the April 22 episode of ECW. On the May 6 episode of ECW, however, Benjamin defeated Kingston, thus ending Kingston's undefeated streak. To end the feud, Kingston then defeated Benjamin in an Extreme Rules match on the May 20 episode of ECW.

On June 25, as part of the 2008 supplemental draft, Benjamin was drafted to the SmackDown brand. On the July 11 episode of SmackDown, Benjamin defeated United States Champion Matt Hardy in a non-title match, earning himself a future title shot. At The Great American Bash on July 20, Benjamin once again defeated Hardy to win the United States Championship. Throughout his reign as champion, he retained the title several times against competitors such as R-Truth and Hurricane Helms. On the March 20, 2009 episode of SmackDown, Benjamin lost his United States Championship to Montel Vontavious Porter, ending Benjamin's reign at 240 days. Benjamin then participated in the Money in the Bank ladder match at WrestleMania 25 on April 5, but failed to win as CM Punk won the match for the second year in a row. On June 29, Benjamin was traded to the ECW brand. The following night, Benjamin returned to the brand in a losing effort to the debuting Yoshi Tatsu. He defeated Tatsu in a rematch the following week on ECW. After a tag team match, Benjamin abandoned his partner Zack Ryder during a tag team match, turning Benjamin face for the first time since 2006. He would soon feud with Ryder and Sheamus over the following weeks. Benjamin and Sheamus began feuding with and traded wins against each other on ECW and Superstars and the feud lasted until Sheamus was moved to the Raw brand on October 26. The next night on ECW, Benjamin lost to Sheamus in Sheamus' final match on the brand.

Benjamin wrestled Christian at TLC: Tables, Ladders & Chairs on December 13 for the ECW Championship in a ladder match, but came up on the losing end. At the Royal Rumble on January 31, 2010, Benjamin entered the Royal Rumble match at entry number 20, but was eliminated by John Cena in under a minute. On the final episode of ECW on February 16, Benjamin formed an alliance with Vladimir Kozlov. Together, they defeated three members of the ECW roster: Vance Archer, Caylen Croft and Trent Barreta. On the February 26 episode of SmackDown, Benjamin returned to the SmackDown brand and once again qualified for the Money in the Bank ladder match at WrestleMania XXVI on March 28, beating CM Punk. However, Benjamin failed to win the match. He defeated the returning Joey Mercury in his last match at the SmackDown tapings on April 20 in a dark match. On April 22, Benjamin was released from his WWE contract, ending his decade-long tenure with the company.

=== Independent circuit (2010–2015) ===
Benjamin made his independent circuit debut on July 24, 2010, in San Diego, California against Scorpio Sky. On July 31, 2010, during the World Wrestling Council's "La Revolución" show in Puerto Rico, Benjamin defeated Ray González to win the WWC Universal Heavyweight Championship. At Crossfire on November 27, Benjamin lost the Universal Heavyweight Championship to Carlito.

In November 2010, Benjamin competed for American Wrestling Rampage. He made his debut on November 10 with Haas facing La Résistance. During his tour with AWR he defeated Shawn Daivari in a steel cage match. He also had tag team matches with Haas taking on Booker T and Scott Steiner. On March 8, 2011, Benjamin wrestled in a dark match prior to the SmackDown tapings in Houston, Texas, defeating Curt Hawkins. On March 9, 2011, Benjamin won the MWF Heavyweight Championship and lost it on June 4.

At JAPW 18th Anniversary Show, Haas, Benjamin and Angle reunited for the first time in 11 years. In the main event, Benjamin and Haas defeated Chris Sabin and Teddy Hart.

On May 15, 2015, Global Force Wrestling (GFW) announced Benjamin as part of their roster. He made his debut for the promotion on June 20, defeating Chris Mordetzky in a main event singles match. Benjamin participated in Global Force Wrestling's inaugural tournament to crown their very first GFW Global Champion, which served as the company's world heavyweight championship. After gaining a victory in the quarter-finals, he forfeited his next match-up to Bobby Roode due to a storyline concussion.

=== Ring of Honor (2010–2013) ===
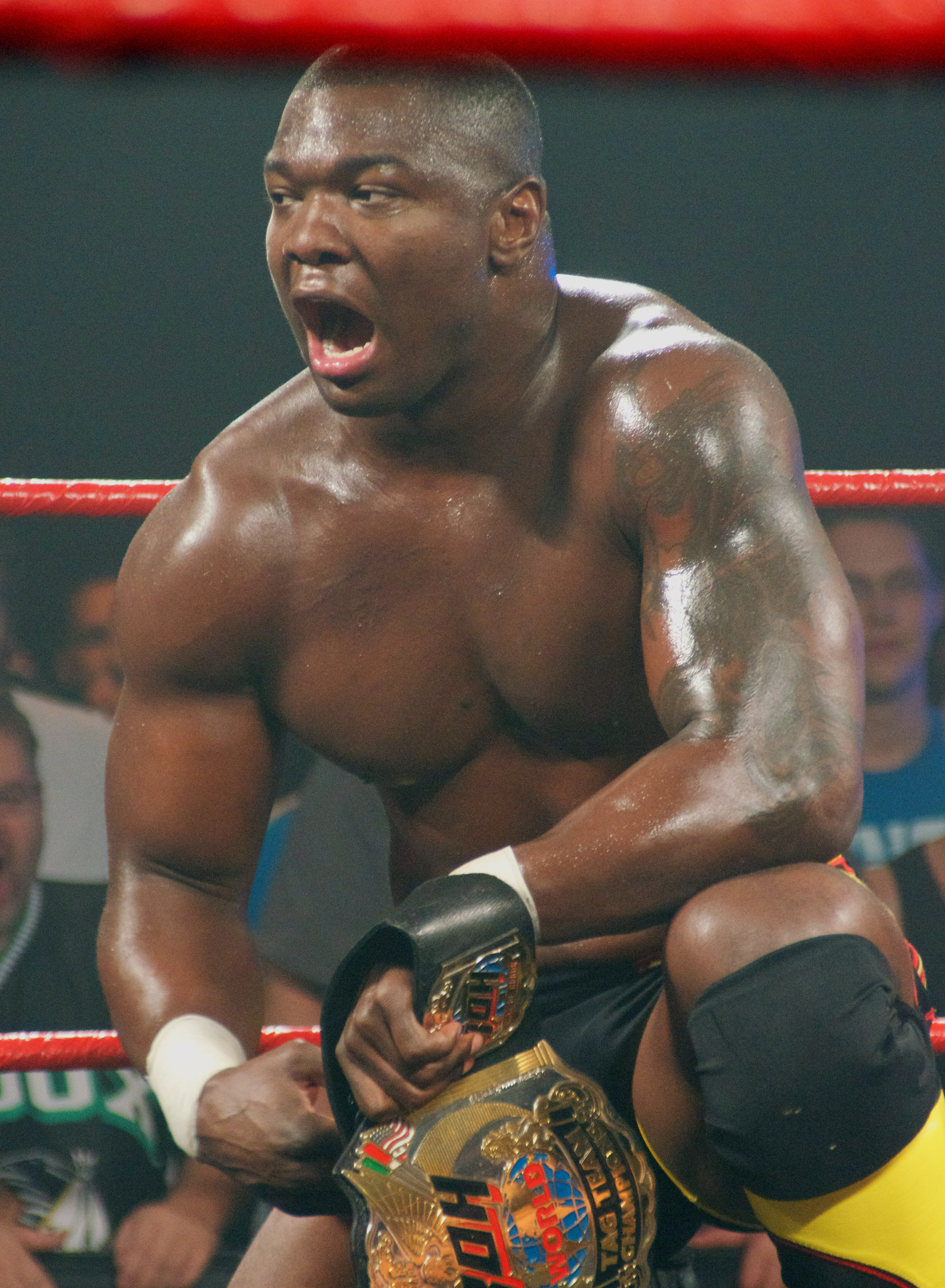
Benjamin as one-half of the ROH World Tag Team Champions in 2011

On September 11, 2010, at Glory By Honor IX, Benjamin and Charlie Haas (billed as "Wrestling's Greatest Tag Team") made their Ring of Honor debuts in a match, where they were defeated by The Kings of Wrestling (Chris Hero and Claudio Castagnoli).

Benjamin and Haas returned to ROH at the Ring of Honor Wrestling television tapings on December 9, where they defeated the Bravado Brothers (Harlem and Lance). The following day, at the second set of television tapings, they defeated the All-Night Express of Kenny King and Rhett Titus, and participated in an eight-man tag team match, teaming with the Briscoe Brothers against the Kings of Wrestling and the All-Night Xpress, which ended in a no contest. On December 18 at the Final Battle 2010 pay-per-view Benjamin and Haas announced that in 2011 they would be wrestling regularly for Ring of Honor. At the following pay-per-view, 9th Anniversary Show, on February 26, 2011, Benjamin and Haas defeated the Briscoe Brothers in the main event of the evening to earn another shot at the Kings of Wrestling and the ROH World Tag Team Championship. On April 1 at Honor Takes Center Stage, Benjamin and Haas defeated the Kings of Wrestling for the ROH World Tag Team Championship. On June 26 at Best in the World 2011, Benjamin and Haas successfully defended the ROH World Tag Team Championship in a four-way match against the Briscoe Brothers, the Kings of Wrestling and the All Night Express. The following day ROH announced that both Benjamin and Haas had signed contracts with the promotion. On December 23, at Final Battle 2011, Wrestling's Greatest Tag Team lost the ROH World Tag Team Championship to the Briscoe Brothers. On May 12, 2012, at Border Wars, Benjamin and Haas regained the ROH World Tag Team Championship from the Briscoe Brothers. On June 24 at Best in the World 2012, Benjamin and Haas lost the title to Kenny King and Rhett Titus.

In early August, ROH, in storyline, suspended Benjamin for attacking Titus and several ROH officials with a steel chair. The suspension was used to explain Benjamin's absence from ROH, while he was working in Japan. Benjamin returned on September 15 at Death Before Dishonor X: State of Emergency, accompanying Charlie Haas and Rhett Titus during their tag team championship tournament matches. On December 16 at Final Battle 2012: Doomsday, Benjamin and Haas defeated Titus and B. J. Whitmer in a Street Fight. The following day it was reported that Benjamin had requested and received a release from his ROH contract. Benjamin made one more appearance for ROH on February 2, 2013, when Haas turned on him during an ROH World Tag Team Championship match against the Briscoe Brothers. Benjamin was scheduled to face Haas on April 5 at Supercard of Honor VII, but after Haas had parted ways with the promotion, he was replaced by Mike Bennett, who went on to defeat Benjamin.

=== New Japan Pro-Wrestling (2012–2015) ===
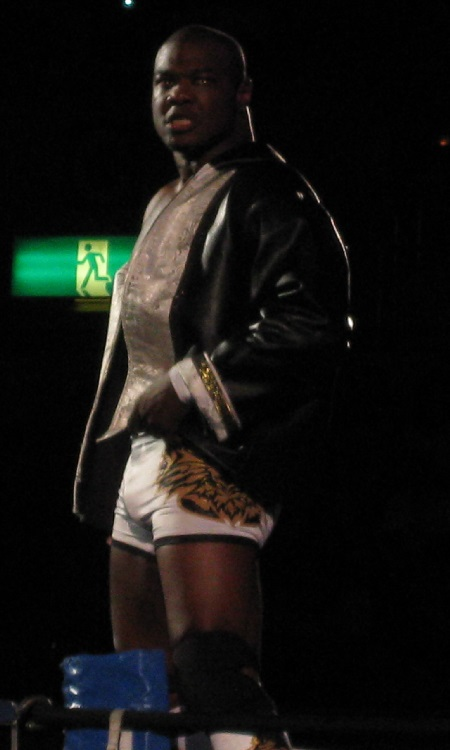
Benjamin in New Japan Pro- Wrestling in September 2013

On December 9, 2011, New Japan Pro-Wrestling announced that Benjamin would be joining MVP for a tag match against Masato Tanaka and Yujiro Takahashi at Wrestle Kingdom VI in Tokyo Dome on January 4, 2012. Benjamin and MVP were victorious in the match, after MVP submitted Takahashi. Benjamin returned to New Japan on June 16 at Dominion 6.16, where he and MVP defeated Karl Anderson and Tama Tonga in a tag team match, with Benjamin pinning Tonga for the win. On July 8, New Japan announced Benjamin as a participant in the 2012 G1 Climax tournament. Benjamin returned to the promotion on July 29 at Last Rebellion, where he, Karl Anderson, MVP and Rush defeated Suzuki-gun (Minoru Suzuki, Lance Archer, Taichi and Taka Michinoku) in an eight-man tag team match, with Benjamin pinning Taichi for the win. In the following month's G1 Climax tournament, Benjamin ended up winning four out of his eight matches, failing to advance to the finals. On November 11, New Japan announced that Benjamin would return to take part in the 2012 World Tag League, where he would be teaming with MVP under the tag team name "Black Dynamite". Benjamin and MVP finished their tournament on December 1 with a record of three wins, one over the reigning IWGP Tag Team Champions K.E.S. (Davey Boy Smith Jr. and Lance Archer), and three losses, failing to advance from their block. On December 2, the final day of the tournament, Benjamin got into a brawl with Masato Tanaka, which led to New Japan the naming him the number one contender to Tanaka's NEVER Openweight Championship the following day. On January 4, 2013, at Wrestle Kingdom 7 in Tokyo Dome, Benjamin unsuccessfully challenged Tanaka for his title.

Benjamin returned to New Japan on April 20, now working as a member of the villainous Suzuki-gun, teaming with the stable's leader Minoru Suzuki in a main event tag team match, where they defeated Kazuchika Okada and Shinsuke Nakamura. On the following tour, Benjamin worked under the ring name "Shelton X Benjamin", playing off the fact that prior to him being revealed as the newest member of Suzuki-gun, Suzuki's partner had been billed simply as "X". On May 3 at Wrestling Dontaku 2013, Benjamin unsuccessfully challenged Nakamura for the IWGP Intercontinental Championship. Benjamin returned to New Japan on June 22 at Dominion 6.22, where he and Minoru Suzuki defeated Shinsuke Nakamura and Tomohiro Ishii in a tag team match, with Benjamin pinning Nakamura for the win. From August 1 to 11, Benjamin took part in the 2013 G1 Climax, where he finished with a record of five wins and four losses, narrowly missing advancement from his block. On September 29 at Destruction, Benjamin received another shot at the IWGP Intercontinental Championship, but was again defeated by Shinsuke Nakamura. From November 24 to December 7, Benjamin and Suzuki took part in the 2013 World Tag League, where they finished with a record of three wins and three losses, with a loss against Takashi Iizuka and Toru Yano on the final day costing them a spot in the semifinals. Benjamin returned to New Japan on January 4, 2014, at Wrestle Kingdom 8 in Tokyo Dome, where he and Suzuki were defeated by The Great Muta and Toru Yano in a tag team match. On March 15, Benjamin entered the 2014 New Japan Cup, defeating Yujiro Takahashi in his first round match. On March 22, Benjamin defeated Katsuyori Shibata to advance to the semifinals of the tournament. The following day, Benjamin was eliminated from the tournament in the semifinals by Bad Luck Fale. From July 21 to August 8, Benjamin took part in the 2014 G1 Climax, where he finished fifth in his block with a record of five wins and five losses.

Benjamin returned to New Japan on January 4, 2015, at Wrestle Kingdom 9 in Tokyo Dome, where he, Davey Boy Smith Jr., Lance Archer and Takashi Iizuka were defeated by Naomichi Marufuji, Toru Yano and TMDK (Mikey Nicholls and Shane Haste) in an eight-man tag team match.

=== Pro Wrestling Noah (2015–2016) ===
On January 10, 2015, Benjamin, along with the rest of Suzuki-gun, took part in a major storyline, where the stable invaded a Pro Wrestling Noah show, attacking Marufuji and TMDK. Benjamin made his in-ring debut for Noah on January 12, when he, Suzuki, Taichi and Michinoku defeated Marufuji, Atsushi Kotoge, Muhammad Yone and Taiji Ishimori in an eight-man tag team match. Over the next few weeks, Benjamin worked all Noah events, while starting a feud with Takashi Sugiura due to him also having a background in amateur wrestling. Benjamin and Sugiura finally met in a grudge match on July 18, where Sugiura was victorious. In November, Benjamin made it to the finals of Noah's premier singles tournament, the Global League, but was defeated there by Naomichi Marufuji. On June 12, 2016, Benjamin unsuccessfully challenged Go Shiozaki for Noah's top title, the GHC Heavyweight Championship.

=== Return to WWE (2017–2023) ===
==== Teaming with Chad Gable (2017–2018) ====
On the July 26, 2016, episode of SmackDown, WWE aired a promotional video, announcing that Benjamin would return to WWE and appear on SmackDown. However, on August 7, 2016, Benjamin announced that due to a torn rotator cuff which required surgery, he "will not be returning to WWE at this time". In March 2017, Benjamin announced that he had been cleared for action, following his injury.

On August 17, 2017, it was reported that Benjamin had re-signed with WWE. He returned on the August 22 episode of SmackDown and was paired with Chad Gable, working as a fan favorite tag team. The duo made their in ring debut on August 30, 2017, defeating The Ascension. At Hell in a Cell, Benjamin and Gable defeated The Hype Bros, marking Benjamin's first appearance at a WWE pay-per-view since 2010. At Clash of Champions, they had their SmackDown Tag Team Championship title shot in a fatal four-way tag team match, in which they were unsuccessful. On the January 2, 2018, episode of SmackDown Live, they defeated The Usos for the titles, but the decision was reversed by the referee when he realized they unknowingly pinned the wrong twin. The following week on SmackDown Live, the duo turned heel when they insulted the referee of their title match the week before, demoralized the fans, and accused general manager Daniel Bryan of being biased, which resulted in Bryan booking them for a two out of three falls match against The Usos at Royal Rumble, where they lost in two straight falls. At WrestleMania 34 on April 8, Benjamin competed alongside Gable in the André the Giant Memorial Battle Royal, but neither won. On April 16, Gable would be traded to Raw during the 2018 WWE Superstar Shake-up, thus disbanding the team.

==== Brand switches (2018–2020) ====
On the April 17 episode of SmackDown, Benjamin issued a challenge to anyone in the locker room. Randy Orton would initially accept the challenge, however, while making his way to the ring, newly drafted United States Champion Jeff Hardy would come out and accept the challenge instead, defeating Benjamin. The following week on SmackDown, Benjamin would issue another open challenge, first answered by Hardy, but Orton would replace him. Benjamin would go onto defeat Orton. Benjamin appeared at the Greatest Royal Rumble in Jeddah, Saudi Arabia, competing in the titular 50-man Royal Rumble match. Benjamin entered the match as entrant number 48 and was eliminated by Chris Jericho.

At the Royal Rumble pay-per-view on January 27, 2019, Benjamin competed in the Royal Rumble match, but was eliminated by Braun Strowman. On the March 11 episode of Raw, Benjamin surprisingly appeared and attacked Seth Rollins, and later faced Rollins in a losing effort. In August, Benjamin was announced as one of sixteen competitors in the King of the Ring, where he was defeated by his former tag team partner Chad Gable in the first round on the August 27 episode of SmackDown Live. As part of the 2019 draft, Benjamin was drafted to the Raw brand. On January 26, 2020, Benjamin participated in the Royal Rumble match and entered at No. 10 at the namesake pay-per-view, but was eliminated by the WWE Champion Brock Lesnar.

==== The Hurt Business (2020–2023) ====
On the June 15 episode of Raw, Benjamin faced United States Champion Apollo Crews, where Crews won after using the ropes as leverage. Following the match in a WWE Network exclusive, MVP promised Benjamin a rematch with Crews for the United States Championship, thus teasing an alliance between the two. On the June 22 episode of Raw, Benjamin attacked Crews during the VIP Lounge with MVP before their scheduled match. Despite this, Benjamin was defeated by Crews.

On the July 20 episode of Raw, Benjamin officially joined MVP and Bobby Lashley's stable The Hurt Business as they helped him capture the 24/7 Championship from R-Truth. During his time with the stable, he would win the 24/7 Championship three times. On the August 10 episode of Raw, Benjamin defeated United States Champion Apollo Crews in a non-title match following a distraction by MVP and Lashley. This was Benjamin's first victory on Raw in over 14 years. On the September 7 episode of Raw, Cedric Alexander joined The Hurt Business when he betrayed Crews and Ricochet during a six-man tag team match, attacking them and helping The Hurt Business win the match. On December 20, at TLC, Alexander and Benjamin defeated The New Day (Kofi Kingston and Xavier Woods) to win the WWE Raw Tag Team Championship. This would also make him a 3-time WWE (Raw) Tag Team Champion. Benjamin and Alexander would later drop the titles back to Kingston and Woods on the March 15 episode of Raw.

On the March 29 episode of Raw, Lashley lambasted Alexander and Benjamin due to them losing the Raw Tag Team Championships and losing to Drew McIntyre in a 2-on-1 handicap match, a loss that meant they would be barred from ringside at Lashley's WWE Championship match at WrestleMania 37 against McIntyre. This led to Lashley attacking Alexander and Benjamin, thus kicking them out of the faction in the process. They started a losing streak, lost to the teams such as The Viking Raiders (Erik and Ivar) twice, and to RK-Bro (Randy Orton and Riddle) once. On the May 3 episode of Raw, Alexander turned on Benjamin after losing to Lucha House Party. On the May 10 episode of Raw, Benjamin fought Alexander in a match with Alexander losing to Benjamin.

On the September 27 episode of Raw, Benjamin and Alexander helped Lashley fight off The New Day and in the process, reuniting The Hurt Business. In January 2022, after not being seen together, Benjamin and Alexander approached Lashley under the assumption they were still a unit, only to be dismissed. This would cause the pair to launch a sneak attack that evening, but they were easily dealt with.

On May 14, 2022, it was reported that Benjamin suffered an undisclosed injury and would be out of action. He made his return on the June 13 taping of Main Event in a winning effort against Akira Tozawa. On August 8, 2022, Benjamin faced Cedric Alexander in the Main Event tapings in a losing effort, effectively signaling the end of The Hurt Business. Afterwards, they embraced each other and shared a moment in the ring, turning Benjamin face for the first time since 2017. On the January 9, 2023, episode of Raw, Benjamin and Alexander reunited to take part in a Tag Team Turmoil match. Earlier during the show, Lashley and MVP teased an alliance, with MVP crediting himself for reuniting Benjamin and Alexander, and getting Lashley reinstated on Raw after being suspended. On the February 6 edition of Raw, Benjamin and Alexander defeated Alpha Academy with MVP in their corner further hinting at a possible reunion. However, the reunion angle was quietly dropped shortly after although Alexander and Benjamin would continue teaming together.

Benjamin was released from his WWE contract on September 21, 2023, ending his second tenure of six years with the company and effectively disbanding the tag team of Alexander and Benjamin.

=== Return to the independent circuit (2024–present) ===
On February 8, 2024, it was announced Benjamin would make his debut for Prestige Wrestling at their event Alive or Just Breathing on May 16 against Josh Alexander, who was later replaced by Tom Lawlor due to health issues. At the event, Benjamin defeated Lawlor.

=== All Elite Wrestling (2024–present) ===
Benjamin made his All Elite Wrestling (AEW) debut on the fifth anniversary episode of Dynamite, where he was reunited with and introduced by fellow former Hurt Business member MVP as his business partner. The duo would go on to reform The Hurt Business under the new name "The Hurt Syndicate" and established themselves as heels. On the October 16 episode of Dynamite, Benjamin made his AEW in-ring debut, where he defeated Lio Rush. On October 30 at Fright Night Dynamite, Benjamin was defeated by Swerve Strickland, suffering his first loss in AEW. After the match, Benjamin, MVP, and a debuting Bobby Lashley attacked Strickland, with Lashley subsequently joining The Hurt Syndicate. On November 24, Benjamin was announced as a participant in the 2024 Continental Classic, where he was placed in the Blue league. Benjamin finished the tournament with 6 points, but failed to advance to the playoff stage.

On the January 22, 2025, episode of Dynamite, Benjamin and Lashley defeated Private Party (Isiah Kassidy and Marq Quen) to win the AEW World Tag Team Championship. On the February 12 episode of Dynamite, Benjamin and Lashley defeated The Gunns (Austin Gunn and Colten Gunn) in their first title defense. On March 9 at Revolution, Benjamin and Lashley successfully defended their titles against The Outrunners (Truth Magnum and Turbo Floyd). On April 6 at Dynasty, Benjamin and Lashley successfully defended their titles against Big Bill and Bryan Keith of The Learning Tree after assistance from MJF, who had been trying to join The Hurt Syndicate in the weeks leading up to Dynasty. On May 14 at Dynamite: Beach Break, Benjamin, Lashley, and MVP accepted MJF as a member of the group. On May 25 at Double or Nothing, Benjamin and Lashley successfully defended their titles against Sons of Texas (Dustin Rhodes and Sammy Guevara). On July 12 at All In, Benjamin and Lashley successfully defended their titles in a three-way tag team match against JetSpeed (Kevin Knight and "Speedball" Mike Bailey) and The Patriarchy (Christian Cage and Nick Wayne). After All In, The Hurt Syndicate (minus MJF) would turn into tweeners as they would be briefly hired by Cope to assist him in his feud with FTR (Cash Wheeler and Dax Harwood). After weeks of tension, The Hurt Syndicate kicked MJF out of the group due to his selfish attitude on the August 6 episode of Dynamite. On August 24 at Forbidden Door, Benjamin and Lashley lost their titles to Brodido (Bandido and Brody King) in a three-way match, ending their reign at 214 days. During the match, Benjamin and Lashley were attacked by The Demand (Ricochet and GOA (Bishop Kaun and Toa Liona)).

After losing the tag titles, The Hurt Syndicate began a feud with The Demand, losing to them at All Out on September 20 in a regular trios match, but defeated them in a rematch at Dynamite: Title Tuesday on October 7 in a Street Fight and on October 12 at WrestleDream in a tornado trios match to become the number one contenders for the AEW World Trios Championship, but failed to defeat The Opps (Samoa Joe, Powerhouse Hobbs, and Katsuyori Shibata) for the titles after Ricochet interfered. At Double or Nothing on May 24, 2026, Benjamin and Lashley were a part of Jericho's team in Stadium Stampede, where they defeated Ricochet's team.

== Personal life ==
Benjamin is a fan of video games. He won WWE's THQ Superstar Challenge, a video game tournament that took place every year during WrestleMania weekend, four years in a row before retiring from the event in 2007. He has the Guinness World Record for "wrestler who won the most WWE THQ Superstar Challenges". In April 2020, during the nationwide quarantine in response to the COVID-19 pandemic, Benjamin jokingly asked parents via Twitter to keep their children from playing online games due to younger players beating his records.

Since 2002, Benjamin has maintained a close friendship with Charlie Haas, who often refers to him as his "brother." He served as the best man at Haas and Jackie Gayda's wedding, and is the godfather to Haas' oldest daughter. Benjamin is also close friends with Brock Lesnar, having met him at the University of Minnesota and roomed with him. He once let Lesnar stay in his basement when Lesnar was out of money. In 2004, Benjamin visited Four Dwellings Primary Academy in Birmingham in the United Kingdom to teach students about reading week.

Benjamin, along with Candice Michelle, Dave Bautista and Josh Mathews, represented WWE at the 2008 Democratic National Convention, in an effort to encourage fans to register to vote in the 2008 Presidential election.

Benjamin has revealed on Lilian Garcia's podcast Chasing Glory in 2020 that he has two daughters.

Benjamin has said he has vertigo, which can make his in-ring performance difficult.

Benjamin is a teetotaller who does not consume drugs or alcohol; In 2025 he stated, "I was "straight edge" before straight edge was a [culture]".

== Other media ==
Benjamin made his WWE video game debut in 2003's WWE SmackDown! Here Comes the Pain, and he would continue to appear in WWE Day of Reckoning, WWE SmackDown! vs. Raw, WWE Day of Reckoning 2, WWE WrestleMania 21, WWE SmackDown! vs. Raw 2006, WWE SmackDown vs. Raw 2007, WWE SmackDown vs. Raw 2009, WWE SmackDown vs. Raw 2010 and WWE SmackDown vs. Raw 2011. After an eight-year absence, Benjamin next appeared in WWE 2K19, WWE 2K20, WWE 2K22, and WWE 2K23.

== Championships and accomplishments ==
=== Track and field ===
- National Junior College Athletic Association
  - Junior College 100 meter Champion

=== Amateur wrestling ===
- National Junior College Athletic Association
  - Junior College National Wrestling Champion
- National Collegiate Athletic Association
  - All-American (1997, 1998)

=== Professional wrestling ===
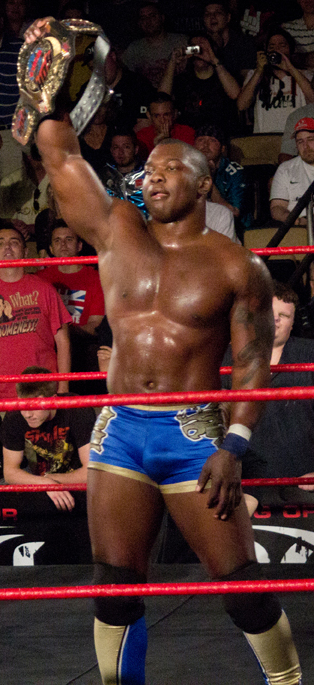
In ROH, Benjamin is a two-time ROH World Tag Team Champion

- All Elite Wrestling
  - AEW World Tag Team Championship (1 time) – with Bobby Lashley
- Millennium Wrestling Federation
  - MWF Heavyweight Championship (1 time)
- Ohio Valley Wrestling
  - OVW Southern Tag Team Championship (4 times) – with Brock Lesnar (3) and Redd Dogg (1)
  - Danny Davis Invitational Tag Team Tournament (2015) – with Charlie Haas
- Pro Wrestling Illustrated
  - Tag Team of the Year (2003) with Charlie Haas
  - Ranked No. 9 of the 500 top wrestlers in the PWI 500 in 2005
- Ring of Honor
  - ROH World Tag Team Championship (2 times) – with Charlie Haas
- World Wrestling Council
  - WWC Universal Heavyweight Championship (1 time)
- Wrestling Observer Newsletter
  - Most Underrated (2005–2007)
- World Wrestling Entertainment / WWE
  - WWE Intercontinental Championship (3 times)
  - WWE United States Championship (1 time)
  - WWE 24/7 Championship (3 times)
  - WWE (Raw) Tag Team Championship (3 times) – with Charlie Haas (2), and Cedric Alexander (1)
  - Slammy Award (1 time)
    - Trash Talker of the Year (2020) as The Hurt Business, shared with Lacey Evans
