= WWE WrestleMania 21 (video game) =

2005 video game

- NTSC cover art
- Developer: Studio Gigante
- Publisher: THQ
- Director: John Tobias
- Designers: Matt Cianchetti; Mike Vinikour
- Platform: Xbox
- Release: NA: April 20, 2005; EU: May 27, 2005
- Genres: Sports
- Modes: Single-player, multiplayer

WWE WrestleMania 21, also known simply as WrestleMania 21 or WrestleMania XXI, is a professional wrestling video game released exclusively for the Xbox in North America on April 20, 2005 and in Europe on May 27, 2005. It was published by THQ and developed by Studio Gigante based on the WWE pay-per event of the same name though it does feature the WrestleMania XX event and not its namesake. It is also the successor to Raw 2. The game was the last WWE game released on the original Xbox. WWE WrestleMania 21 was the last game to be released by Studio Gigante.

== Gameplay ==
WWE WrestleMania 21 includes superstars from WWE Raw 2 and new wrestlers, including: Charlie Haas, Jackie Gayda, Garrison Cade, René Duprée, Shelton Benjamin, and Eugene. The game features a new reversal system dubbed the Pro Reversal System. This feature allows for simpler functionality with reversing an opponent's move. Online multiplayer was available until the termination of Xbox Live on April 15, 2010. WWE WrestleMania 21 is now playable online again on the replacement Xbox Live servers for the Xbox called Insignia.

== Development and release ==
WrestleMania 21 was first announced by THQ just before E3 2004, stating that the game would be replacing the Raw video game series. Microsoft accidentally sent an older broken version of the game to the disc manufacturer, resulting in gamers being unable to connect to the Xbox Live service upon release until a downloadable patch was made available soon thereafter. Because it is now impossible to download the latest update from Xbox Live, the Platinum Hits (silver disc) version contained the latest patch. A number of game-breaking bugs were fixed, and gameplay adjustments were made.

== Reception ==
Reception

Aggregate score
Aggregator	Score
Metacritic	56/100

Review scores
Publication	Score
Electronic Gaming Monthly	5/10
Eurogamer	3/10
Game Informer	5.75/10
GamePro	4/5
GameSpot	4.5/10
GameSpy	2/5
GameZone	4/10
IGN	6/10
Official Xbox Magazine (US)	6.8/10
X-Play	2/5
The Sydney Morning Herald	2/5
The Times	2/5

Despite an upgrade in visuals, and a fully voiced career-mode, the game was met with a very mixed reception due to its gameplay. Rather than being an upgrade of a pre-existing game engine, it was virtually built from the ground up, as well as containing numerous glitches that crippled the gameplay experience. In their review of the game, GameSpot mentioned that the hit detection was horrible. Other problems included a slow and unresponsive AI taking away from the difficulty, or drastically decreasing the length of a match. The Create-a-Wrestler mode lacked a variety of moves, and items for the wrestler being created. While specialty matches are included within the game, they are only playable in 1 on 1. Among other problems, VideoGamer.com mentioned that the game had sloppy controls. IGN gave the game a rating of 6 out of 10, praising the high quality visuals, but like other reviews took issue with the flaws in the gameplay.

== See also ==
- List of professional wrestling video games
- List of fighting games
