= JAPW Tag Team Championship =

Professional wrestling tag team championship

Details
- Promotion: Jersey All Pro Wrestling
- Date established: December 5, 1997
- Date retired: 2014
Statistics
- First champions: The Blood Angels (Diablos Macabre and Lucifer Grimm)
- Final champions: Outlaw Inc; Eddie Kingston and Homicide
- Most reigns: (as team) Da Hit Squad (Mafia and Monsta Mack) (Six reigns) (as individual) Homicide and Monsta Mack (7 reigns)
- Longest reign: Outlaw Inc; Eddie Kingston and Homicide (627-991 days)
- Shortest reign: Da Hit Squad (1 day)

The JAPW Tag Team Championship is a championship in the Jersey All Pro Wrestling promotion. It became official title on December 5, 1997 when The Blood Angels (Diablos Macabre and Lucifer Grimm) defeated Don Montoya and Homicide in a tournament final to crown the first champion. There have been 42 reigns by 33 teams and 53 wrestlers with three vacancies.

== Title history ==
No.	Team	Reign	Date	Days held	Location	Event	Notes
1	The Blood Angels (Diablos Macabre and Lucifer Grimm)	1	December 5, 1997	65	Bayonne, NJ	JAPW Night Of The Barbwire #1	Defeat Don Montoya and Homicide in Barbed Wire match to become first champions.
2	The Sickness (Twiggy Ramirez and Adorable Anthony)	1	February 6, 1998	44	Bayonne, NJ	JAPW Valentine's Day Massacre 1998	
3	The Nation of Immigration (Homicide and Kane D)	1	March 22, 1998	59	Newark, NJ	JAPW 1st Annual JAP Convention & Anniversary: Night Of The Barbwire #2	Defeated The Blood Angels and The Sickness in a three way dance.
4	The Skin Head Express (Lord Zieg and Crazy Ivan)	1	May 20, 1998		Bayonne, NJ	JAPW	
-	Vacant		July, 1998		North Bergen, NJ		
5	The Haas Brothers (Russ and Charlie Haas)	1	July 22, 1998	34		JAPW	Defeated Skin Head Express and Nation of Immigration in a three way dance.
6	The Nation of Immigration (Homicide(2) and Kane D (2))	2	August 25, 1998	157		JAPW	Nation of Immigration won the titles in a weapons match.
7	D-Sex (Trent Acid and Billy Reil)	1	January 29, 1999	28	Bayonne, NJ	JAPW	
8	The Big Unit (Dave Desire and Rick Silver)	1	February 26, 1999	84	Bayonne, NJ	JAPW Valentine's Day Massacre 1999	
9	The Haas Brothers	2	May 21, 1999	280	Bayonne, NJ	JAPW Night Of The Barbwire #4	Defeated Rick Silver in a handicap match.
10	Da Hit Squad (Mafia and Monsta Mack)	1	February 25, 2000	197	Bayonne, NJ	JAPW Valentine's Day Massacre 2000	Defeated The Big Unit and The Haas Brothers in a three way dance.
11	Don Montoya and Homicide(3)	1	September 9, 2000	68	Sayreville, NJ	JAPW September Slaughter	
12	Da Hit Squad (Mafia and Monsta Mack)	2	November 17, 2000	180	Bayonne, NJ	JAPW Battle In Bayonne	
13	Dixie and The Insane Dragon	1	May 18, 2001	50	Philadelphia, PA	JAPW The Upset	
14	Da Hit Squad (Mafia and Monsta Mack)	3	July 7, 2001	42	Philadelphia, PA	JAPW Royal Consequences	
15	Mikey Whipwreck and JT Jobber	1	August 18, 2001	6	Philadelphia, PA	JAPW The Hit Squads Revenge: The Body Count Continues	
16	Da Hit Squad (Mafia and Monsta Mack)	4	August 24, 2001	252	Bayonne, NJ	JAPW The Aftermath	Defeated Youth Gone Wild and Mikey Whipwreck/JT Jobber in a three way dance.
17	Mike and Todd Shane	1	May 3, 2002	71	St. Petersburg, FL	IPW Hardcore Zero Tolerance: Plex Pandemonium	
-	Vacant		July 13, 2002		Seaside Heights, NJ		Mike and Todd Shane were stripped of the titles.
18	Insane Dragon (2) and Jay Briscoe	1	July 13, 2002	28	Seaside Heights, NJ	JAPW Summer Shore Series 2002 - Unfinished Business	Won a 3 way match, when Dragon and Jay Briscoe each pin a member of Da Hit Squad.
19	Da Hit Squad (Mafia and Monsta Mack)	5	August 10, 2002	182	Seaside Heights, NJ	JAPW Summer Shore Series 2002 - Royal Consequences 2	Defeated Jay Briscoe/Insane Dragon and Deranged/Mark Briscoe in a Table, Ladders and Chairs match.
20	Dirty Rotten Scoundrels (E.C. Negro and Casey Blade)	1	January 25, 2003	245	Bayonne, NJ	JAPW Tough Love	Defeated Mafia. Monsta Mack had a leg injury and couldn't compete
21	April Hunter and Slyck Wagner Brown	1	September 27, 2003	161	Rahway, NJ	JAPW Funkin Homicide	
22	Shaolin Wrecking Crew (Magic and Suba)	1	March 6, 2004	29	South Plainfield, NJ	JAPW Basebrawl	
23	The Solution (Papadon and Havoc)	1	April 4, 2004	250	Rahway, NJ	JAPW Awesome Sacrifice	
24	The Christopher Street Connection (Buff E. and Mace Mendoza)	1	December 10, 2004	50	Rahway, NJ	JAPW Seasons Beatings 2004	
25	Strong Styles Thugs (B-Boy and Homicide(4))	1	January 29, 2005	56	Rahway, NJ	JAPW Wild Card 2005	
26	Teddy Hart and Jack Evans	1	March 26, 2005	112	Rahway, NJ	JAPW Caged Fury	Hart and Evans won the titles in a steel cage match.
27	The Backseat Boyz (Trent Acid^{(2)} and Johnny Kashmere)	1	July 16, 2005	98	Rahway, NJ	JAPW GORED!	Defeated Jack Evans in a handicap match. Teddy Hart no-showed due to "a problem at the airport".
28	Teddy Hart (2) and Homicide (5)	1	October 22, 2005	21	Atlantic City, NJ	JAPW 8th Anniversary Show	Defeated The Briscoe Brothers, SATs, and Backseat Boyz in a Four Way match.
29	Backseat Boyz (Trent Acid^{(3) and} Johnny Kashmere)	2	November 12, 2005	21	Rahway, NJ	JAPW Fall Out	Trent Acid defeated Teddy Hart in a Street Fight match to win the title. Chooses Johnny Kashmere for his partner.
30	The S.A.T. (Jose and Joel Maximo)	1	December 3, 2005	168	Braintree, MA	JAPW Neil Sullivan Jr. Fundraiser	Defeat Trent Acid in a handicap match.
31	The Outcast Killahs (Oman Tortuga and Diablo Santiago)	1	May 20, 2006	161	Rahway, NJ	JAPW Homecoming 2	Defeat The SAT in a TLC Match.
32	Jay Lethal and Azrieal	1	October 28, 2006	224	Rahway, NJ	JAPW 9th Anniversary Show	Defeated SAT and Outcast Killaz in a Triple Threat match.
33	The Latin American Xchange (Homicide (6) and Hernandez)	1	June 9, 2007	525	Rahway, NJ	JAPW Back To Business	
34	The F.B.I. (Little Guido and Tracy Smothers)	1	November 15, 2008	28	Jersey City, NJ	JAPW Reboot	
35	D-N-A (Dixie(2) and Azrieal(2))	1	December 13, 2008	105	Rahway, NJ	JAPW 11th Anniversary Show	
36	The Garden State Gods (Corvis Fear and Myke Quest)	1	March 28, 2009	126	Rahway, NJ	JAPW Unfinished Business 2009	
37	The Hillbilly Wrecking Crew (Brodie Lee and Necro Butcher)	1	August 1, 2009	273	Jersey City, NJ	JAPW European Homicide	
38	The Heavy Hitters (Monsta Mack(6) and Havok)	1	January 23, 2010	175	Rahway, NJ	JAPW 12th Anniversary Show	This was a three-way match, also involving The H8 Club (Nick Gage and Nate Hatred)
39	The United States Death Machine (Sami Callihan and Chris Dickinson)	1	October 23, 2010	48	Jersey City, NJ	JAPW Halloween Hell 2010	This was a three-way match, also involving The Chair Swinging Freaks (Axl Rotten and Balls Mahoney).
40	Da Hit Squad (Mafia(6) and Monsta Mack(7))	6	December 10, 2010	1	Rahway, NJ	JAPW 13th Anniversary Show - Tag 1	
41	The Hillbilly Wrecking Crew (Necro Butcher ^{(2)} and Nick Gage)	2	December 11, 2010	125	Philadelphia, PA	JAPW 13th Anniversary Show - Tag 2	
-	Vacant		April 15, 2011				On April 15, 2011, JAPW management declared the titles vacant.
42	Outlaw Inc (Eddie Kingston and Homicide)	1	April 14, 2012	627-991	Rahway, NJ	JAPW 14th Anniversary Show - The Final Countdown	Defeated Philly's Most Wanted (Joker and Sabian) in a Ghetto Street Fight to win the vacant title.
-	Retired		2014				

== Combined reigns ==
=== By team ===
Rank	Wrestler	No. of reigns	Combined days
1.	Outlaw Inc (Eddie Kingston and Homicide)	1	627- 991
2.	Da Hit Squad (Mafia and Monsta Mack)	6	854
3.	The Latin American Xchange (Homicide and Hernandez)	1	525
4.	The Haas Brothers (Russ and Charlie Haas)	2	314
5.	The Heavy Hitters (Monsta Mack and Havok)	1	273
6.	The Solution (Papadon and Havoc)	1	250
7.	Dirty Rotten Scoundrels (E.C. Negro and Casey Blade)	1	245
8.	Jay Lethal and Azrieal	1	224
9.	The Nation of Immigration (Homicide and Kane D)	2	216
10.	The Hillbilly Wrecking Crew (Brodie Lee and Necro Butcher)	1	175
11.	The S.A.T. (Jose and Joel Maximo)	1	168
12.	April Hunter and Slyk Wagner Brown	1	161
12.	The Outcast Killahs (Oman Tortuga and Diablo Santiago)	1	161
14.	The Garden State Gods (Corvis Fear and Myke Quest)	1	126
15.	'The Hillbilly Wrecking Crew (Necro Butcher and Nick Gage)	1	125
16.	The Backseat Boyz (Trent Acid and Johnny Kashmere)	2	119
17.	Teddy Hart and Jack Evans	1	112
18.	D.N.A. (Dixie and Azrieal)	1	105
19.	The Big Unit (Dave Desire and Rick Silver)	1	84
20.	Mike and Todd Shane	1	71
21.	Don Montoya and Homicide	1	68
22.	The Blood Angels (Diablos Macabre and Lucifer Grimm)	1	65
23.	Strong Styles Thugs (B-Boy and Homicide)	1	56
24.	Dixie and The Insane Dragon	1	50
24.	The Christopher Street Connection (Buff E. and Mace Mendoza)	1	50
26.	The United States Death Machine (Sami Callihan and Chris Dickinson)	1	48
27.	The Sickness (Twiggy Ramirez and Adorable Anthony)	1	44
28.	The Shaolin Wrecking Crew	1	29
29.	D-Sex (Trent Acid and Billy Reil)	1	28
29.	Insane Dragon and Jay Briscoe	1	28
29.	The F.B.I. (Little Guido and Tracy Smothers)	1	28
32.	Teddy Hart and Homicide	1	21
33.	Mikey Whipwreck and JT Jobber	1	6

=== By wrestler ===
Rank	Wrestler	No. of reigns	Combined days
1.	Homicide	7	1531-1797
2.	Eddie Kingston	1	627-991
3.	Monsta Mack	7	1127
4.	Mafia/Dan Maff	6	854
5.	Hernandez	1	525
6.	Havok	2	523
7.	Azrieal	2	329
8.	Russ Haas	3	314
8.	Charlie Haas	3	314
10.	Necro Butcher	2	300
11.	Papadon	1	250
12.	E.C Negro	1	245
12.	Casey Blade	1	245
14.	Jay Lethal	1	224
15.	Kane D	2	216
16.	Brodie Lee	1	175
17.	Jose Maximo	1	168
17.	Joel Maximo	1	168
19.	April Hunter	1	161
19.	Slyk Wagner Brown	1	161
19.	Oman Tortuga	1	161
19.	Diablo Santiago	1	161
23.	Trent Acid	3	147
24.	Teddy Hart	2	133
25.	Corvis Fear	1	126
25.	Mike Quest	1	126
27.	Nick Gage	1	125
28.	Johnny Kashmere	2	119
29.	Jack Evans	1	112
30.	Dixie	1	105
31.	Dave Desire	1	84
31.	Rick Silver	1	84
33.	The Insane Dragon	2	78
34.	Mike Shane	1	71
34.	Todd Shane	1	71
36.	Don Montoya	1	68
37.	Diablos Macabre	1	65
37.	Lucifer Grimm	1	65
39.	B-Boy	1	56
40.	Buff E.	1	50
40.	Mace Mendoza	1	50
42.	Sami Callihan	1	48
42.	Chris Dickinson	1	48
44.	Twiggy Ramirez	1	44
44.	Adorable Anthony	1	44
46.	Magic	1	29
46.	Suba	1	29
48.	Billy Reil	1	28
48.	Jay Briscoe	1	28
48.	Little Guido	1	28
48.	Tracy Smothers	1	28
52.	Mikey Whipwreck	1	6
52.	JT Jobber	1	6

== See also ==
- Jersey All Pro Wrestling
