= Dan Maff =

American professional wrestler

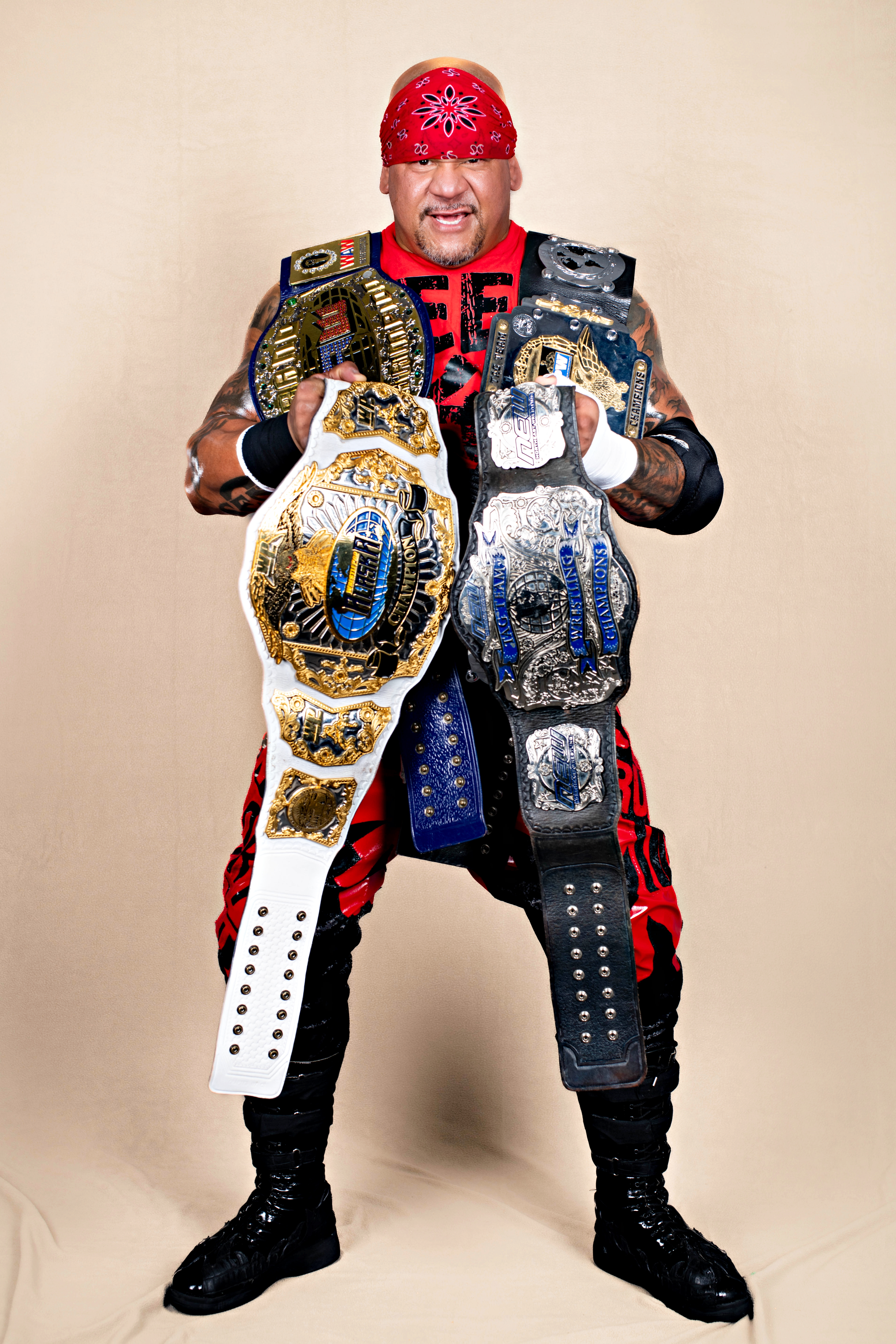
- Maff in 2024

Personal information
- Born: Daniel Lopez; October 28, 1973 (age 52) Newark, New Jersey, U.S.

Professional wrestling career
- Ring name(s): Dan Maff; Danny Maff; Mafia; Mafia Mack
- Billed height: 5 ft 7 in (1.70 m)
- Billed weight: 305 lb (138 kg)
- Billed from: Bed–Stuy Do-or-Die, Brooklyn, New York, Bayonne, New Jersey
- Trained by: Homicide; Magic
- Debut: 1999

Daniel Lopez (born October 28, 1973), better known by his ring name Dan Maff, is an American professional wrestler, currently performs on the independent circuit. He is best known for his time with Ring of Honor (ROH), Combat Zone Wrestling (CZW), Long Island Wrestling Federation (LIWF) and Jersey All Pro Wrestling (JAPW).

== Professional wrestling career ==
=== Da Hit Squad ===
Lopez attended Jersey All Pro Wrestling (JAPW) shows as a fan and enrolled in the JAPW training school when it opened in the late 1990s. After training for several months, Lopez began attending Homicide's training school, The Doghouse, in New York City. When his training was completed in 1999, Lopez adopted the name "Mafia" and formed a tag team with another Doghouse graduate who he resembled, Monsta Mack.

Mafia and Mack, collectively known as Da Hit Squad, began wrestling on the northeastern independent circuit. They won the JAPW Tag Team Championship in 1999 and in Jersey Championship Wrestling's Tag Team Championship in 2000. In 2001, the duo won titles in World Xtreme Wrestling and USA Pro Wrestling. At one stage they held a total of six titles between them. After Mack injured his leg, he was unable to defend his half of the JAPW Tag Team Championship in a scheduled match on January 25, 2003, against the Dirty Rotten Scoundrelz. Lopez unsuccessfully defended the title in a handicap match.

=== Jersey All Pro Wrestling (1999–2005) ===
Lopez won the JAPW Heavyweight Championship on February 22, 2003, in Woodbridge, New Jersey, defeating his trainer, Homicide. Inspired by his victory, Lopez left the partnership with Mack, who he defeated in a match for USA Pro Wrestling on March 8. Following a successful title defense against Slyk Wagner Brown, Lopez announced he was renaming himself "Dan Maff" and formed a stable with the Dirty Rotten Scoundrelz known as "La Familia". Lopez's title reign came to an end on August 1, 2003, when he was defeated by Al Snow, a WWE employee brought into JAPW as an outside challenger. He won the title for a second time on December 13, 2003, defeating Jerry Lawler in Secaucus, New Jersey.

On February 28, 2004, Lopez defended the JAPW Heavyweight Championship against his former partner, Monsta Mack. Lopez retained the title and embraced Mack after the match in a show of respect and camaraderie. The Dirty Rotten Scoundrelz were disgusted by the show of sportsmanship and attacked Lopez as he tried to leave the ring. Mack returned to the ring, but, instead of helping his former partner, assisted the Soundrelz with their assault on Lopez. Mack then formed a new version of La Familia with the Soundrelz and enlisted a number of heels to try to take the title away from Lopez. Lopez fought off a number of challengers, including ECW alumnus Mike Awesome. He also engaged in a lengthy feud for the JAPW Heavyweight Championship with the number one contender, Jay Lethal.

=== Ring of Honor (2002–2005) ===
Lopez (as "Mafia") and Mack appeared on The Era of Honor Begins, the inaugural Ring of Honor (ROH) event, on February 23, 2002, attacking the Christopher Street Connection (CSC). They feuded with the CSC for several weeks before beginning a series of hardcore matches with The Carnage Crew, H.C. Loc and DeVito. In 2003, Da Hit Squad formed a loose alliance with Homicide. Lopez betrayed Mack on April 12, 2003, at Epic Encounter. Later that evening, Lopez went to the ring immediately after a match between Homicide and Christopher Daniels and indicated that he had joined forces with Daniels and his stable, "The Prophecy". Lopez was renamed "Dan Maff" and designated "the assassin of The Prophecy".

Lopez's singles career in ROH began on May 31 at Do Or Die, where he defeated B. J. Whitmer with the assistance of Allison Danger, the valet of The Prophecy. Following his victory, Lopez was confronted by two of Homicide's former students, Julius Smokes and Low Ki, who accused him of "forgetting his roots".

On June 14 at Night of the Grudges, The Prophecy (Lopez, Daniels and Donovan Morgan) defeated rival faction The Group, with Lopez pinning ROH World Champion Samoa Joe. This led to a title match at WrestleRave '03 on June 28, where Joe defeated Lopez to retain. Lopez and the rest of The Prophecy continued to feud with Homicide and his supporters, leading to a match between Lopez and Low-Ki at Bitter Friends, Stiffer Enemies on August 16. The match was halted when Lopez was legitimately knocked unconscious following a poorly timed, stiff kick from Low-Ki.

In late 2003, Lopez competed in the annual Field of Honor event, but was eliminated by B. J. Whitmer. Whitmer joined The Prophecy on December 22 at Final Battle 2003, and confessed that he had been behind a career-ending attack on Lucy, the valet of CM Punk, earlier that year. This infuriated Lopez, who had been disgusted by the brutal attack and had sworn on his father's grave to Punk that The Prophecy had nothing to do with the attack. Lopez called Whitmer a "scumbag" but was admonished by Daniels, who claimed that the attack was part of his plan to destroy ROH. Lopez and Whitmer began teaming together in 2004 after Daniels left ROH, and, along with Allison Danger, continued their feud with CM Punk and the Second City Saints. They defeated the Saints in a match for the ROH Tag Team Championships on May 15, 2004, in Lexington, MA at Round Robin Challenge III, but lost the title to the Briscoe Brothers that same evening. On June 12, 2004, at World Title Classic, Lopez and Whitmer defeated three other teams in a 35-minute-long Ultimate Endurance Match. After the match, Lopez convinced Whitmer to discard both the Prophecy name and the managerial services of Allison Danger, claiming that they no longer needed a leader or a manager and could now win matches on their own merits. Danger was furious and placed a bounty on the heads of Lopez and Whitmer. They spent several months feuding with teams sent after them by Danger, including Slash Venom and Chicano and The Carnage Crew. On December 26 at Final Battle 2004 they defeated the Carnage Crew in a "Fight Without Honor" and shook hands with their opponents after the match. Whitmer and Lopez captured the ROH Tag Team Championship for a second time at the third ROH anniversary show on February 19, 2005, in Elizabeth, New Jersey, defeating the Havana Pitbulls.

=== Retirement ===
In March 2005, Homicide issued a number of statements accusing Lopez of "betraying" him and announcing that he would not work for any company which hired Lopez in the future. As a result, Lopez retired from professional wrestling. The titles, which he held at the time, were vacated although he kept both of the physical belts themselves. JAPW openly acknowledged the situation between Lopez and Homicide.

=== Return to the independent circuit (2005–present) ===
Lopez broke his retirement on October 8, 2005, unsuccessfully challenging El Chicano for the IWA Puerto Rico Heavyweight Championship in Levittown.

In February 2009, Lopez arrived at American Championship Entertainment (ACE) in Union City, New Jersey after multiple cryptic videos and comments on the ACE message board, in the ring, face to face, Lopez was challenging the current champion for the belt during the next show "Destined For Greatness". On March 21, 2009, Lopez defeated Hollywood Joe Hardway for the Heavyweight Championship.

Lopez was a surprise guest at Jersey All Pro Wrestling's June 28 event in Jersey City, New Jersey. Maff made his return after the World Heavyweight Title bout between Heavyweight Champion Kenny Omega and New Jersey State Champion, The Grim Reefer. Lopez and Homicide did appear at the same show at the Elks Lodge in Queens on July 12, 2010. On June 27, 2009, Lopez defeated Jay Lethal to win the JAPW Heavyweight Title for the third time.

Lopez also worked for other independent promotions. On March 19, 2010, Lopez defeated Rob Fury, El Shoes and Xavier at the ICW return show "Reborn" at the Elks Lodge in Queens, New York. He also wrestled for Pro Wrestling Syndicate (PWS).

On May 13, 2011, New Japan Pro-Wrestling (NJPW), with help from JAPW, held their first ever shows in the United States as part of the Invasion Tour 2011. During the event, held in Rahway, New Jersey, Maff made his debut for the Japanese promotion, losing to Toru Yano via low blow in the first round of a tournament to determine the first IWGP Intercontinental Champion. At the following day's event in New York City, Maff teamed with Jushin Thunder Liger and Tiger Mask in a six-man tag team match, where they defeated CHAOS (Shinsuke Nakamura, Gedo and Jado). On the final day of the tour in Philadelphia, Pennsylvania, Maff teamed with Satoshi Kojima in a match, where they were defeated by the IWGP Tag Team Champions, Bad Intentions (Giant Bernard and Karl Anderson).

On August 19, 2011, Maff became Impact Championship Wrestling's Heavyweight Champion after winning one-day tournament. He defeated Azrieal in the first round, Devon Moore in semifinal and Danny Demanto in final.

On August 15, 2014, Maff made a surprise appearance for House of Glory Wrestling in Queens, New York. He was a last minute replacement for Jay Lethal and took the loss against Anthony Gangone. In June 2015, Maff became Pro Wrestling Syndicate Champion by defeating Mario Bokara and Fallah Bahh in a Tri Force Match.

Since 2016, Maff has been a mainstay at Pat Buck's WrestlePro. On November 18, 2016, Maff became WrestlePro's first Silver Champion.

=== Return to Ring of Honor (2019–2020) ===
In November 2019, Maff made his return to Ring of Honor, facing PCO in a match. After his good performance, ROH offered him a contract, which he signed. However, in October 2020, his profile was removed from ROH website.

== Championships and accomplishments ==
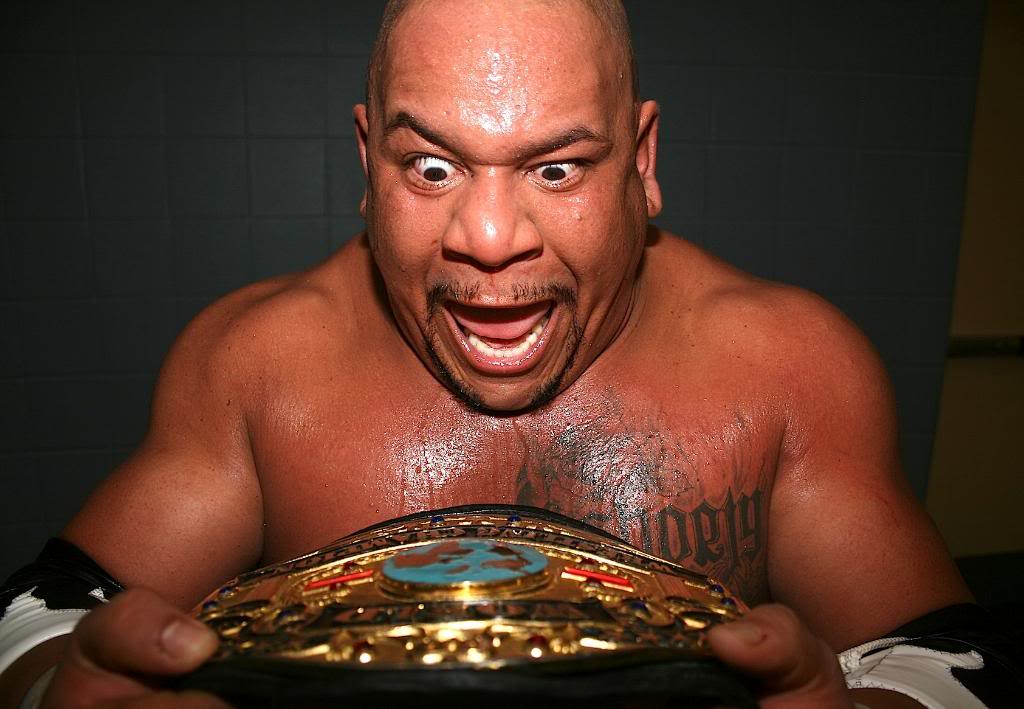
Maff after beating Low Ki for the JAPW Heavyweight Championship in 2012

- American Championship Entertainment
  - ACE Heavyweight Championship (4 times)
  - ACE Tag Team Championship (1 time, current) - with Shawn Donovan
- Awesome Championship Wrestling
  - ACW Tag Team Championship (1 time, inaugural) - with Shawn Donovan
- BPW(battlefield pro wrestling)
  - BPW(battlefield pro wrestling) Heavyweight Championship (1 times, current)
- Beyond Wrestling
  - Tournament For Tomorrow 4 Tag Team (2015) – with Monsta Mack
- Combat Zone Wrestling
  - CZW World Tag Team Championship (1 time) – with Monsta Mack
- Defiant Wrestling Alliance
  - DWA Heavyweight Championship (1 time)
- Impact Championship Wrestling/ICW No Hold Barred
  - ICW Heavyweight Championship (1 time)
  - ICW Tag Team Championship (1 time) – with Monsta Mack
  - Battle Of The Tough Guys (2021)
- Independent Superstars Of Pro Wrestling
  - ISPW Tag Team Championship (1 time) - with Shawn Donavan
- Jersey All Pro Wrestling
  - JAPW Heavyweight Championship (4 times)
  - JAPW Tag Team Championship (6 times) – with Monsta Mack
  - JAPW Hall of Fame (2016)
- Jersey Championship Wrestling
  - JCW Tag Team Championship (2 times) – with Low Ki (1) and Monsta Mack (1)
- Liberty States Wrestling
  - LSW Heavyweight Championship (1 time, final)
- New Blood Wrestling
  - NBW Heavyweight Championship (1 time)
- Northeast Wrestling
  - NEW Heavyweight Championship (1 time)
  - NEW Tag Team Championship (1 time) – with Kerr
- Squared Circle Expo
  - SCX Tag Team Championship (1 time, current) – with Shawn Donovan
- Pennsylvania Premiere Wrestling
  - PPW Tag Team Championship (2 times) – with Havoc & Shawn Donavan
- Pro Wrestling Alliance
  - PWA Tag Team Championship (1 time) – with Eddie Thomas
- Pro Wrestling Illustrated
  - PWI ranked him #260 of the top 500 singles wrestlers in the PWI 500 in 2003
- Pro Wrestling Magic
  - PWM Championship (2 times)
- Pro Wrestling Syndicate
  - PWS Heavyweight Championship (1 time)
- Ring of Honor
  - ROH Tag Team Championship (2 times) – with B. J. Whitmer
- South Jersey Championship Wrestling
  - SJCW Tag Team Championship (1 time) – with Dizzie
- SuperKrazee Pro Wrestling
  - SKPW Tag Team Championship (1 time) – with Shawn Donavan
- Fight Factory Wrestling
  - Fight Factory Premier Championship (1 time, inaugural)
  - Fight Factory Tag Team Championship (1 time, inaugural, current) – with Shawn Donovan
- USA Pro Wrestling
  - USA Pro Tag Team Championship (2 times) – with Monsta Mack
- Warriors Of Wrestling
  - WOW Heavyweight Championship (1 time)
- We Are Wrestling
  - WAW Grand Championship (1 time, current)
- Wrestling Has A Tomorrow
  - WHAT! Championship (1 time, inaugural)
- World Xtreme Wrestling
  - WXW Heavyweight Championship (1 time, current)
  - WXW Tag Team Championship (2 times) – with Monsta Mack
- World Xtreme Wrestling C4
  - WXW Ultimate Heavyweight Championship (1 time)
  - WXW Elite Tag Team Championship (1 time) - with Shawn Donavan
  - Samoan Legacy Cup Tournament (2016)
- WrestlePro
  - WrestlePro Alaska Championship (1 time)
  - WrestlePro Silver Championship (1 time)
  - WrestlePro Alaska Tag Team Championship (1 time) – with Bobcat
  - WrestlePro Tag Team Championship (1 time) – with Shawn Donovan
- Long Island Wrestling Federation
  - LIWF Tag Team Championship (1 time) – with Monsta Mack
