= Charlie Haas =

American professional wrestler and collegiate wrestler (born 1972)

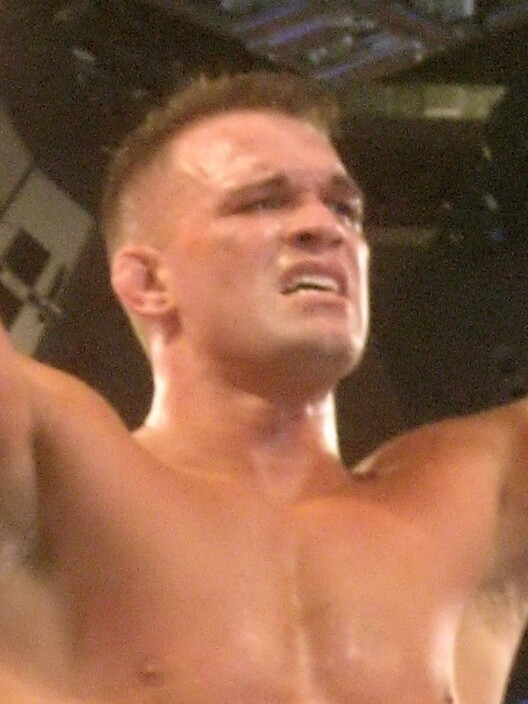
- Haas in 2009

Personal information
- Born: Charles Doyle Haas II; March 27, 1972 (age 54) Edmond, Oklahoma, U.S.
- Education: Seton Hall University
- Spouses: Jackie Gayda (m. 2005; div. 2020) Jennifer Haas (m. 2022)
- Children: 4
- Family: Russ Haas (brother); Hugh Devore (grandfather)

Professional wrestling career
- Ring name(s): Charlie Haas; MVC; R.C. Haas
- Billed height: 6 ft 2 in (188 cm)
- Billed weight: 249 lb (113 kg)
- Billed from: Dallas, Texas
- Trained by: Jim Kettner; John Smith; Mike Sharpe; Vince Sylva; Jim Rogers
- Debut: 1996

Charles Doyle Haas II (born March 27, 1972) is an American professional and former amateur wrestler. He is best known for his time in World Wrestling Entertainment (WWE) from 2000 to 2009 and Ring of Honor (ROH) from 2010 to 2013. In WWE he was a member of Team Angle, which later became a Tag team duo with Shelton Benjamin known as "The World's Greatest Tag Team".

Haas was an amateur wrestler in high school, and attended Seton Hall University on a wrestling scholarship, before becoming a stockbroker. He became a professional wrestler in 1996, and regularly teamed with his brother, Russ, with the two winning numerous championships on the independent circuit, including the CZW World Tag Team Championship and the JAPW Tag Team Championship. After signing contracts with WWE, Haas Brothers were assigned to WWE's developmental territories, where they won the MCW Southern Tag Team Championship on three occasions. After Russ died in 2001 due to a heart attack, Haas began wrestling in singles competition, winning the HWA Heavyweight Championship once.

Haas formed a team with Shelton Benjamin and the two debuted on SmackDown in December 2002. They won the WWE Tag Team Championship twice, and dubbed themselves The World's Greatest Tag Team before they split in 2004. Haas won the WWE Tag Team Championship once more with Rico, and gained Miss Jackie, whom he later married, as a valet. Haas then transferred into singles competition before being released from WWE in 2005. After a short stint in Jersey All Pro Wrestling (JAPW) and other independent promotions, Haas was re-signed to WWE in April 2006. He formed a short-lived team with Viscera, before reforming the World's Greatest Tag Team with Benjamin. After Benjamin transferred to the ECW brand, Haas began wrestling with a comical luchador persona, before developing a character where he imitated other wrestlers and WWE Hall of Famers. In addition, Haas won the last match on WWE Heat when the show ended on May 30, 2008.

Haas was released from WWE in February 2010. He soon returned to the independent circuit, including returning to JAPW and appearing for Ring of Honor. In September 2010, he won the NWA Texas Heavyweight Championship. On April 1, 2011, Haas and Benjamin won the ROH World Tag Team Championship and held it until December 2011. Haas announced his retirement from professional wrestling in March 2013, but returned to competition in August that same year. Aside from wrestling, Haas and his then-wife Jackie ran a nutritional store, Custom Muscle Nutrition and Smoothie Shop, in Frisco, Texas, which they opened in October 2008 but has since closed.

== Professional wrestling career ==
=== Early career (1996–2000) ===
After debuting in 1996 as a professional wrestler, Haas regularly teamed with his brother Russ for numerous independent promotions. On July 22, 1998, The Haas Brothers won the Jersey All Pro Wrestling Tag Team Championship by defeating The Skin Head Express. They lost it to The Nation of Immigration just over a month later on August 25. They won the championship for the second time on May 21, 1999, by defeating The Big Unit (Rick Silver and Dave Desire), and held the championship until February 25, 2000 when they were defeated by Da Hit Squad. During 2000 they also held the Pennsylvania Championship Wrestling Tag Team Championship and the ECWA Tag Team Championship in the East Coast Wrestling Association promotion, which they won by defeating The Backseat Boyz (Trent Acid and Johnny Kashmere).

The Haas brothers began competing for Combat Zone Wrestling (CZW) in November 1999, losing to The King Pinz at The War Begins on November 20, 1999. They competed regularly for CZW throughout early 2000, and won the CZW World Tag Team Championship on February 12 at Climbing The Ladder by defeating The Kashmerino Brothers and The Thrill Kill Kult in a three-way match. On July 10, they lost the championship to The Backseat Boyz at Caged To The End, when Johnny Kashmere defeated Russ in a singles match and was awarded the championship.

=== World Wrestling Federation/World Wrestling Entertainment (2000–2005) ===
After a World Wrestling Federation (WWF) tryout match at Madison Square Garden on August 7, 2000, they signed a developmental contract with WWF. The two worked their way through the tag ranks in the WWF's developmental territories, Memphis Championship Wrestling (MCW) and the Heartland Wrestling Association (HWA). Also competed in dark matches and house shows for WWF. The brothers won the MCW Southern Tag Team Championship three times during early 2001, defeating The Dupps the first time and The Island Boyz and Joey Matthews and Christian York in a three-way match on both the second and third occasions. Russ died from a heart attack due to a pre-existing heart condition, on December 15, 2001 at age 27. The brothers fought in house shows and dark matches in the WWF up until Russ died. After Russ' death, Charlie continue to fight in dark matches. After Russ' death as a tribute to him, Haas wrote Russ' name on his wrist tape, and used the name "R.C. Haas" (standing for Russ–Charlie) before being called up to the main WWE roster. On January 2, 2002, Haas won the HWA Heavyweight Championship, his first singles championship, by defeating Val Venis. He was later stripped of the title on January 29 due to a scripted contract loophole. After World Wrestling Entertainment (renamed from the WWF) ended its affiliation with the HWA, Haas was moved to Ohio Valley Wrestling (OVW) where he competed until December 2002.

Haas debuted on WWE's main roster on the December 26, 2002 episode of SmackDown! as a heel (villainous character) along with Shelton Benjamin as Team Angle. The tag team was the "contingency plan" of Paul Heyman, and were intended to help WWE Champion Kurt Angle retain his title, attacking Chris Benoit and Brock Lesnar in an attempt to soften them up. They quickly won the WWE Tag Team Championship on February 6, 2003, by defeating Los Guerreros (Eddie and Chavo Guerrero Jr.). They held the championship for three months, including a successful title defense at WrestleMania XIX against Los Guerreros and the team of Chris Benoit and Rhyno, before losing the championship to Eddie Guerrero and his new partner Tajiri in a ladder match on May 18 at Judgment Day. On the June 12 episode of SmackDown!, Angle fired Haas and Benjamin after they blamed him for losing the Tag Team Championship and began to question his leadership. The duo then dubbed themselves The World's Greatest Tag Team, although announcers made sure to add "Self Proclaimed" to the name. Haas and Benjamin regained the championship from Guerrero and Tajiri on the July 3 episode of SmackDown!, but lost it to the reformed Los Guerreros on September 18. The team was separated when Benjamin was moved to the Raw brand as part of the 2004 Draft Lottery.

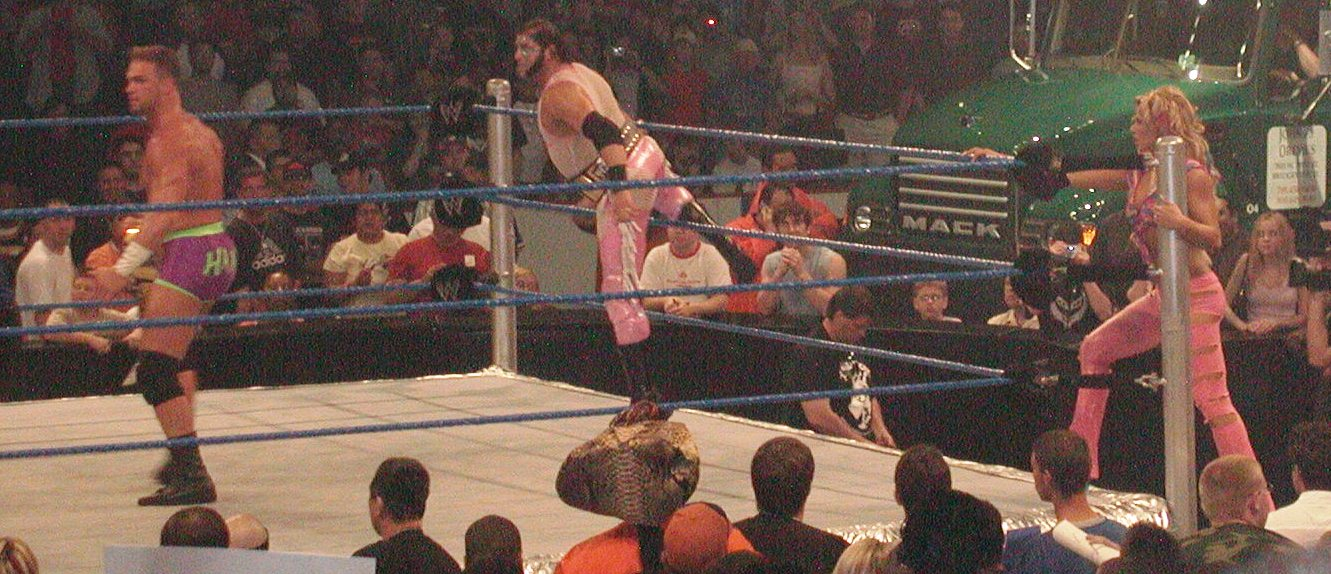
Haas (left) with Rico (center) and Miss Jackie (right).

After Benjamin's draft, Haas turned into a fan favorite and gained Miss Jackie as a valet. He teamed with Rico to win the WWE Tag Team Championship on April 22, 2004. The pair lost the championship to the Dudley Boyz on June 17, and shortly afterwards, Haas became a singles wrestler, although he retained Miss Jackie as his valet. Haas lost a match to Luther Reigns at the Great American Bash.

Haas was later involved in an angle in which he was in a love triangle with Miss Jackie, who was acknowledged on-screen as his fiancée, and Dawn Marie. The storyline culminated when Haas served as the special-guest referee in a match at Armageddon between the two women. After the match, Haas left both women in storyline, although he continued his relationship with Miss Jackie off-screen. In early 2005, he formed a tag team with Hardcore Holly. They were involved in a feud (scripted rivalry) with MNM for the WWE Tag Team Championship, but never won the championship.

On July 8, 2005, Haas was released by World Wrestling Entertainment along with his real-life wife Jackie Gayda.

=== Independent circuit (2005–2006) ===
He returned to JAPW later in July 2005, and began a feud for the JAPW Heavyweight Championship with Jay Lethal. On September 10 at JAPW Haas of Pain, Lethal defeated Haas to retain his title. In JAPW, on October 27, 2007, Haas was inducted along with his late brother Russ into the first class of the Jersey All Pro Wrestling Hall of Fame.

He won the New Legacy Championship at Ballpark Brawl V on August 13, 2005, defeating then-champion Christopher Daniels and Chris Sabin in a triple threat match. He successfully defended the title the next night at Ballpark Brawl VI against Harry Smith with Mick Foley as a referee.

During his time back in the independent circuit, Haas competed in the East Coast Wrestling Association's (ECWA) Super 8 Tournament in 2006, where he advanced all the way to the finals before losing to Davey Richards.

=== Return to WWE (2006–2010) ===
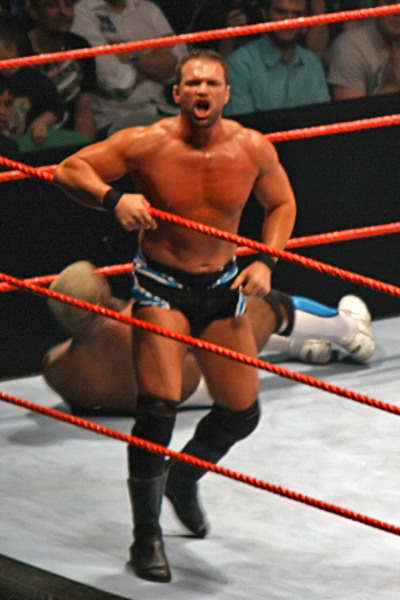
Haas calls to the crowd following a hot tag from long-time partner Shelton Benjamin in late 2007.

Haas returned to WWE in 2006, appearing on the April 17, 2006, episode of Raw as Rob Van Dam's handpicked opponent for his former partner, Shelton Benjamin. Haas defeated Benjamin in the ensuing match. Haas continued to wrestle on the lower midcard spot, becoming a regular fixture on Heat.

On the June 5, 2006 episode of Raw, Haas inadvertently knocked Lilian Garcia off the ring apron as he was entering the ring. It was announced on WWE's official website that as a result, Garcia suffered a sprained wrist. As a result of the legitimate accident, Haas began a feud with Garcia's onetime storyline love interest Viscera. Haas made advances towards Garcia, at one point forcefully kissing her and then dropping her to the ground. Haas and Viscera continued to fight for Garcia's affection in the ring, until she told them both that she wanted to be "just friends". Haas gave Viscera an eye rake in anger, and a blinded Viscera accidentally gave Garcia a Samoan drop. Though it was unintentional, when both Haas and Viscera had seen what had happened to their now former love interest, they simply had a laugh about it, thus making Haas a villain. After that, Viscera and Haas became a tag team, competing on both Raw and Heat until splitting in December 2006.

After Shelton Benjamin won a match against Super Crazy on the December 4, 2006, edition of Raw, Haas came out to celebrate his win with a bewildered Benjamin. Haas and Benjamin announced the return of the World's Greatest Tag Team on the December 11, 2006 edition of Raw, and they defeated The Highlanders in their return match. They then started a feud with Cryme Tyme. They continued to compete on Raw through the start of 2007, facing teams including John Cena and Shawn Michaels and Ric Flair and Carlito. In mid-2007, The World's Greatest Tag Team feuded briefly with The Hardys in storyline; at the One Night Stand pay-per-view on June 3, 2007, they challenged The Hardys for the World Tag Team Championship in a ladder match but were unsuccessful. The team broke up once again when Benjamin moved to the ECW brand on November 20, 2007.

Early in 2008, Haas developed a gimmick in which he would go under the ring in the middle of his matches and re-emerge wearing a mask. In this "alter-ego", Haas would sometimes perform luchador-esque maneuvers in a comical fashion (such as attempting a diving splash, but instead landing on his feet and hitting a standing splash). The opponent would often unmask Haas mid-match, returning him to his normal demeanor. During this persona, Haas usually competed in dark matches before the live broadcast of Raw or on Heat.

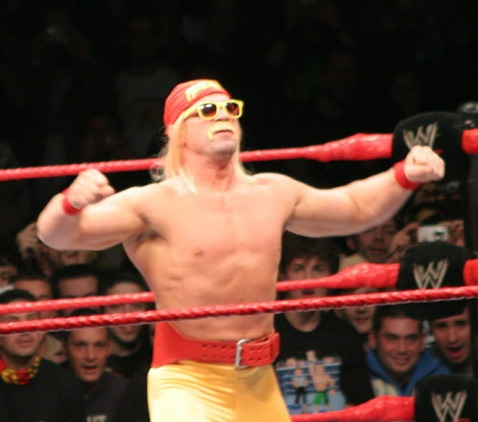
Haas in November 2008 as Haas Hogan, a parody of Hulk Hogan.

Beginning in late August, Haas turned into a face and began a storyline in which he began to impersonate other wrestlers, a concept created by John Laurinaitis, a WWE executive. His first match on August 25, 2008 under this gimmick was a loss to Carlito's real-life brother Primo Colón, while Haas was parodying Carlito with the name "Charlito". He has portrayed such superstars as John Cena, John "Bradshaw" Layfield, Jim Ross, The Great Khali, Montel Vontavious Porter, legends such as Stone Cold Steve Austin, Bret Hart, "Mr. Perfect" Curt Hennig, Jimmy "Superfly" Snuka, Rowdy Roddy Piper, the Undertaker, Hulk Hogan and even WWE Diva Beth Phoenix for which he won a Slammy Award.

On April 15, 2009, Haas was drafted to the SmackDown brand as part of the 2009 Supplemental Draft. On the May 8, 2009 episode of SmackDown, Haas made his in-ring return to the brand as a heel, abandoning his persona of imitating other wrestlers, and losing to John Morrison in a match where he was accompanied by his former World's Greatest Tag Team partner, Shelton Benjamin. The following week on the May 15, 2009 episode of SmackDown, Benjamin and Haas unofficially reunited and competed against John Morrison and CM Punk in a losing effort, but Benjamin was traded to the ECW brand in June.

On July 24, 2009 episode of SmackDown, Haas competed against R-Truth in a losing effort. The following week, on July 31, 2009 episode of SmackDown, he competed against The Great Khali, ending in a no-contest due to Kane being involved in the match by attacking Ranjin Singh at Khali's corner. After an absence of several months, Haas made his return to television by teaming with Mike Knox in a losing effort against Cryme Tyme on the December 31, 2009 episode of Superstars. This marked Haas’ last match in WWE. On February 28, 2010, WWE announced that Haas had been released from his contract.

=== Return to Independent circuit (2010) ===
On March 20, 2010, Haas made a surprise return to Jersey All Pro Wrestling and defeated Devon Moore for the JAPW New Jersey State Championship. On May 22 Haas and JAPW Heavyweight Champion Dan Maff put their titles on the line in a tag team match against the Hillbilly Wrecking Crew (Brodie Lee and Necro Butcher). In the end, Maff turned on Haas and hit him with a chair, after which Lee pinned him to win the JAPW New Jersey State Championship.

On September 10, 2010, Haas won the NWA Texas Heavyweight Championship by defeating Michael Faith in Amarillo. In May 2011, Haas took part in New Japan Pro-Wrestling's first tour of the United States, the Invasion Tour 2011. In their opening show on May 13 in Rahway, New Jersey, Haas teamed with Rhyno in a tag team main event, where they defeated IWGP Heavyweight Champion Hiroshi Tanahashi and Togi Makabe. The following day in New York City, Haas unsuccessfully challenged Tanahashi for his title. On August 20, 2011, Haas became the inaugural Family Wrestling Entertainment (FWE) Heavyweight Champion by defeating Jay Lethal and Eric Young. He held the championship for four months before losing it to Young on December 17.

=== Ring of Honor (2010–2013) ===
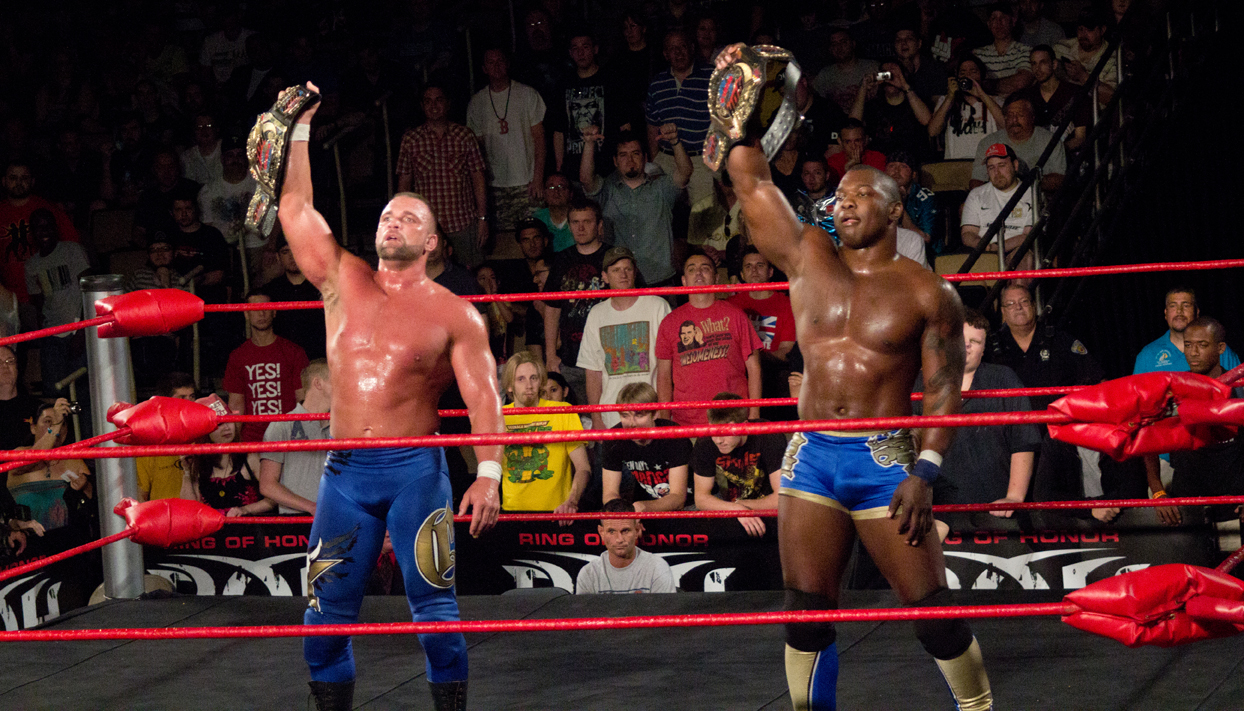
Wrestling's Greatest Tag Team as ROH World Tag Team Champions.

On September 11, 2010, Haas and Shelton Benjamin made their debut as Wrestling's Greatest Tag Team in Ring of Honor (ROH) losing to The Kings of Wrestling at the Glory By Honor IX pay-per-view. They returned to ROH at the Ring of Honor Wrestling television tapings on December 9, where they defeated the Bravado Brothers (Harlem and Lance). The following day, at the second set of television tapings, Haas and Benjamin defeated the All-Night Xpress of Kenny King and Rhett Titus, and participated in an eight-man tag team match, teaming with the Briscoe Brothers against the Kings of Wrestling and the All-Night Xpress, which ended in a no contest. At the Final Battle 2010 pay-per-view on December 18, Haas and Benjamin announced they would be wrestling regularly for ROH in 2011. At the following pay-per-view, 9th Anniversary Show, on February 26, 2011, Haas and Benjamin defeated the Briscoe Brothers in the main event of the evening to earn another shot at the Kings of Wrestling and the ROH World Tag Team Championship. On April 1, at the first night of the Honor Takes Center Stage pay-per-view, Haas and Benjamin defeated the Kings of Wrestling to win the ROH World Tag Team Championship. On June 26 at Best in the World 2011, Haas and Benjamin successfully defended the ROH World Tag Team Championship in a four-way match against the Briscoe Brothers, the Kings of Wrestling and the All-Night Express. The following day ROH announced that both Haas and Benjamin had signed contracts with the promotion. At Final Battle 2011, Haas and Benjamin lost the ROH World Tag Team Championship to the Briscoes despite severely attacking them before the match started, turning them into villainous characters. On May 12, 2012, at Border Wars, Haas and Benjamin regained the ROH World Tag Team Championship from the Briscoe Brothers. On June 24 at Best in the World 2012, Haas and Benjamin lost the title to Kenny King and Rhett Titus. Shortly after their loss, Benjamin was suspended in storyline, to explain his absence while wrestling in Japan. Benjamin returned at the Death Before Dishonor X pay-per-view, accompanying Haas and Rhett Titus in a tag team championship match. Following Death Before Dishonor, Haas and Benjamin would continue to feud with Titus and his new tag team partner B. J. Whitmer defeating them at Glory By Honor XI. They defeated them again in a street fight at Final Battle, where Haas won the match after sent BJ against a table. On February 2, 2013, Haas turned on Benjamin during an ROH World Tag Team Championship match against the Briscoe Brothers. He continued his feud with BJ, fighting in the 11th Anniversary Show in a No Holds Barred Match. BJ won the match when the referee stopped the match.

=== Late career (2013–present) ===
On March 30, 2013, Haas announced his retirement from professional wrestling, which coincided with him leaving Ring of Honor. He returned to the ring several months later.

At JAPW 18th Anniversary Show in November 2014, Haas, Benjamin, and Angle reunited, as Team Angle, for the first time in 11 years. In the main event, Benjamin and Haas defeated Chris Sabin and Teddy Hart.

At NWA Parade Of Champions 2K16 in March 2016 Haas was defeated by the NWA World Heavyweight Champion Jax Dane

In 2020, after a two year retirement, Haas began to work with SWE Fury. He would defeat Tim Storm for the SWE Heavyweight Championship on February 6, 2021 in Irving, Texas.

As of 2026, he occasionally wrestles.

=== Impact Wrestling (2022) ===
On the January 13, 2022 episode of Impact!, Haas made his Impact Wrestling debut by challenging Josh Alexander to a match. The following week on Impact!, Haas lost to Alexander, and after the match, they embraced in the middle of the ring.

== Personal life ==
Haas married fellow professional wrestler Jackie Gayda in 2005. The couple have four children, born in 2006, 2008, 2010, and 2012. In December 2020, Haas announced that he and Gayda were divorced.

On July 9, 2022, Haas announced via Twitter that he is married to Jennifer Haas.

Haas competed in amateur wrestling during high school, and for Seton Hall University, where he attended on a wrestling scholarship. He also has various other awards for wrestling from high school. Haas was a two-time Big East Champion at Seton Hall and graduated with a degree in economics and business. He then became a stockbroker with Goldman Sachs. According to Haas via the Q&A section on his website, he is a devout Christian. Following the death of his brother, Haas has wrestled with Russ (his brother's name) written on his wrist tape as a tribute. Since 2002 he has maintained a close friendship with his longtime tag team partner Shelton Benjamin, who he often refers to as his "brother." Benjamin served as Haas's best man at his wedding to Gayda and is the godfather to Haas' oldest daughter.

His grandfather Hugh Devore, was an assistant with the Houston Oilers and a former head coach of the Notre Dame Fighting Irish. Haas' brother Russ was also a professional wrestler, until his death in 2001 due to a heart attack.

In 2008, Haas and Gayda opened the "Custom Muscle Nutrition and Smoothie Shop", a nutritional store, in Frisco, Texas.

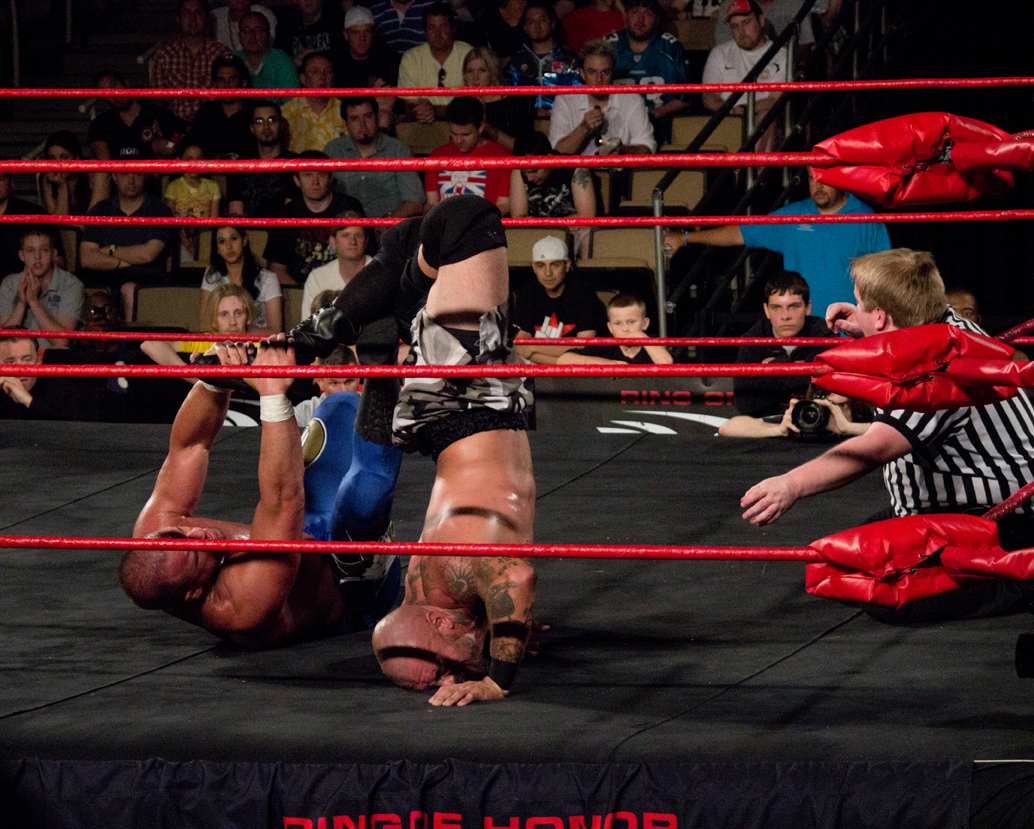
Haas applying the Haas of Pain, a submission hold he invented.

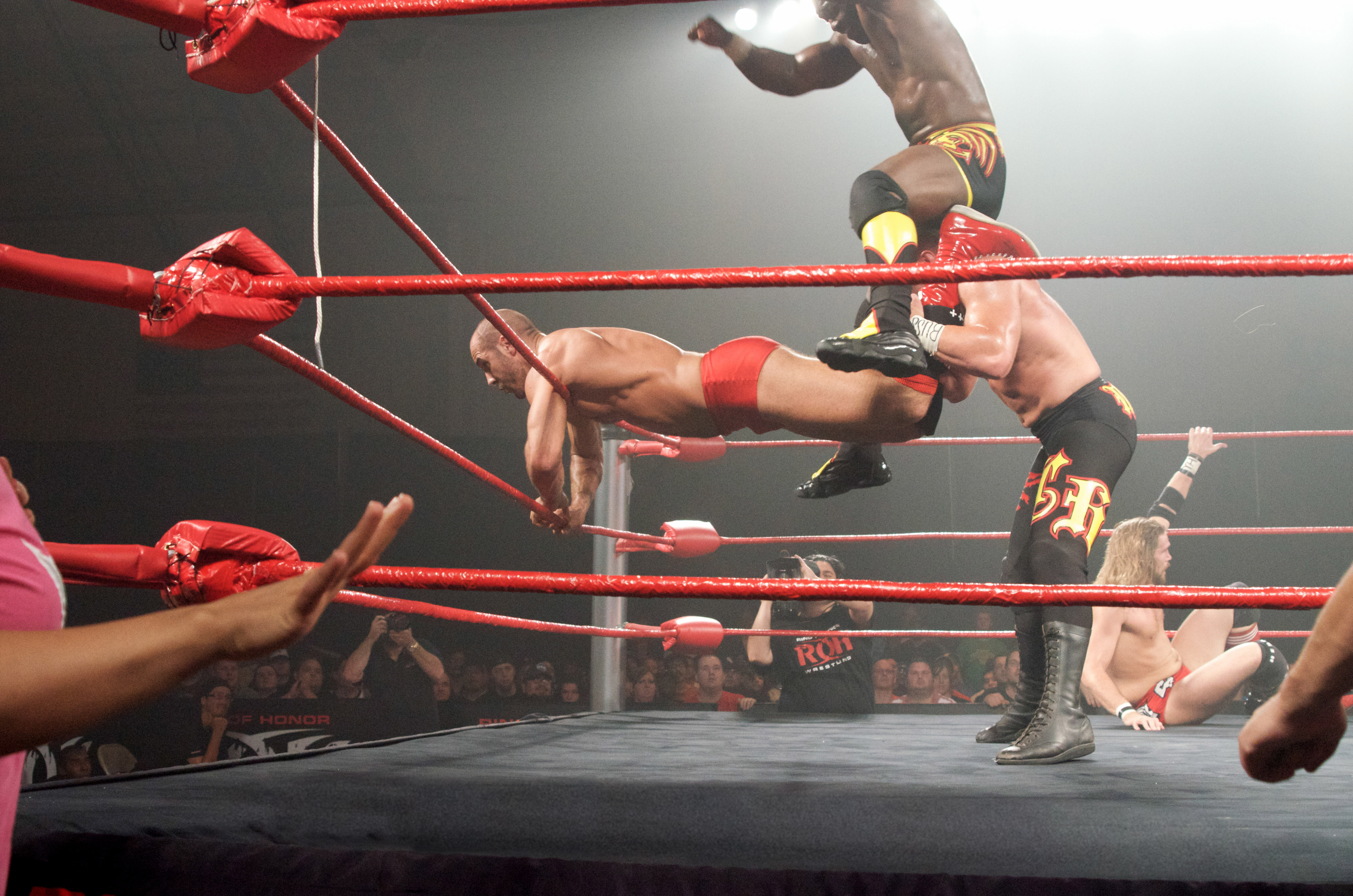
Haas holding Claudio Castagnoli in a rope hung position as Shelton Benjamin leapfrogs onto Castagnoli's back.

== Championships and accomplishments ==
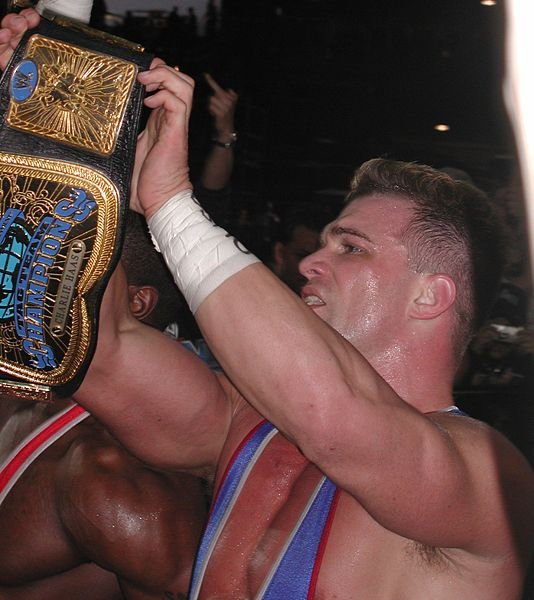
Haas is a three-time WWE Tag Team Champion

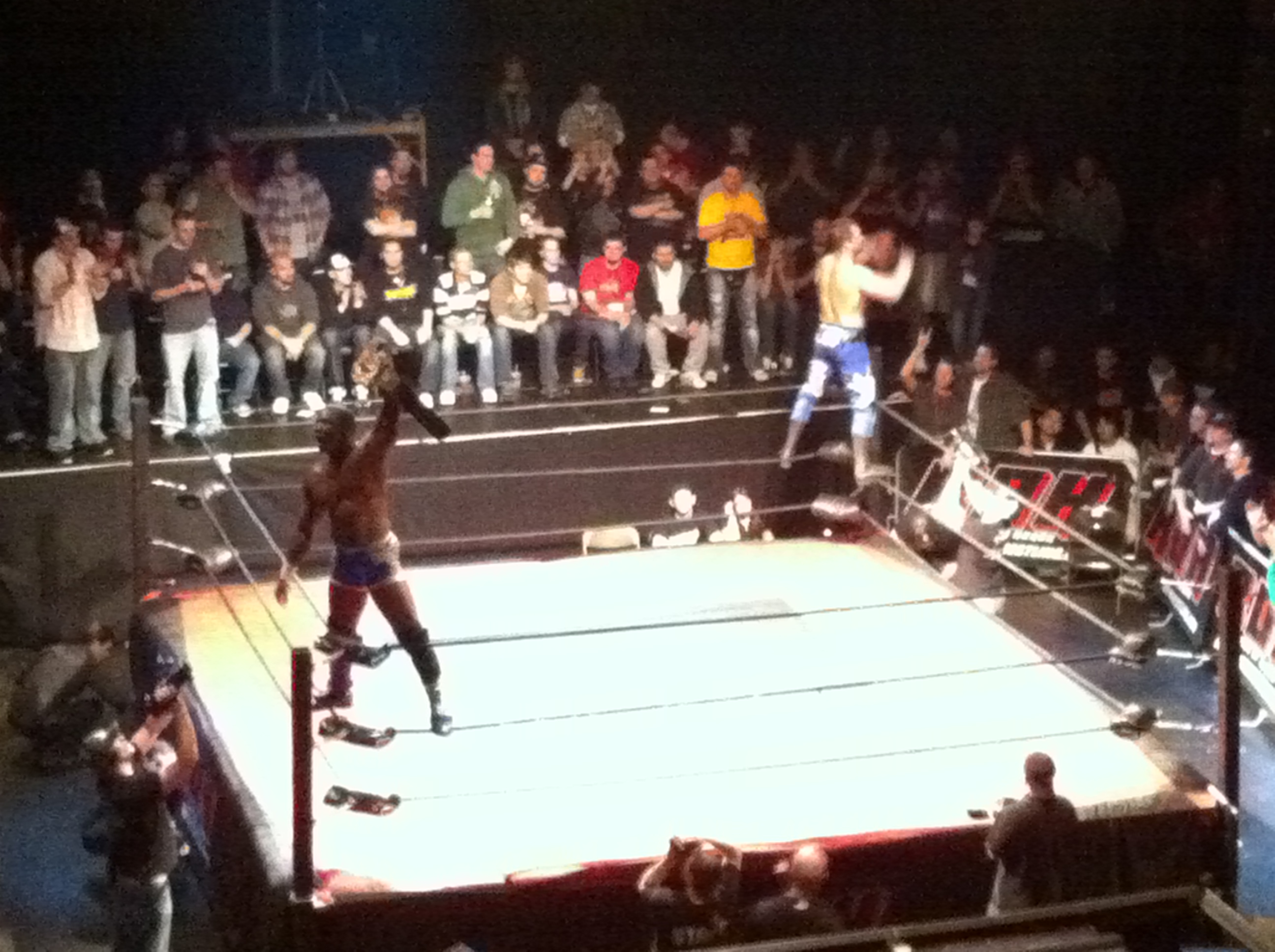
Haas and Shelton Benjamin as the ROH World Tag Team Champions in April 2011.

- Ballpark Brawl
  - Natural Heavyweight Championship (1 time)
- Combat Zone Wrestling
  - CZW World Tag Team Championship (1 time) – with Russ Haas
- East Coast Wrestling Association
  - ECWA Tag Team Championship (1 time) – with Russ Haas
  - ECWA Hall of Fame (Class of 2004)
- Family Wrestling Entertainment
  - FWE Heavyweight Championship (1 time, inaugural)
- George Tragos/Lou Thesz Professional Wrestling Hall of Fame
  - Class of 2027
- Heartland Wrestling Association
  - HWA Heavyweight Championship (1 time)
- Insane Hardcore Wrestling Entertainment
  - IHWE California West Coast Heavyweight Championship (1 time)
  - IHWE DFW Championship (2 times)
  - IHWE Heavyweight Championship (1 time)
  - IHWE Triple Crown Championship (1 time)
- Jersey All Pro Wrestling
  - JAPW New Jersey State Championship (1 time)
  - JAPW Tag Team Championship (2 times) – with Russ Haas
  - JAPW Hall of Fame (Class of 2007)
- Memphis Championship Wrestling
  - MCW Southern Tag Team Championship (3 times) – with Russ Haas
- NWA Branded Outlaw Wrestling
  - NWA BOW Heavyweight Championship (1 time)
- NWA Southwest
  - NWA Texas Heavyweight Championship (1 time)
- NWA Texoma
  - NWA Texoma Heavyweight Championship (2 time)
  - NWA Texoma Tag Team Championship (1 time) - with Dane Griffin
- Ohio Valley Wrestling
  - Danny Davis Invitational Tag Team Tournament (2015) - with Shelton Benjamin
- Old School Wrestling
  - Osw World Heavyweight Championship (1 time)
- Phoenix Championship Wrestling
  - Russ Haas Memorial Tag Team Tournament (2002) – with Nova
- Pro Wrestling Illustrated
  - PWI Tag Team of the Year (2003) with Shelton Benjamin
  - Ranked No. 25 of the top 500 singles wrestlers in the PWI 500 in 2003
- Ring of Honor
  - ROH World Tag Team Championship (2 times) – with Shelton Benjamin
- Southwest Wrestling Entertainment
  - SWE Heavyweight Championship (1 time)
  - SWE Six Man Tag Team Championship (1 time) - with Rodney Mack and Max Castellanos
- Top Of Texas Pro Wrestling
  - Dennis Stamp Tag Team Hero's Cup (2017) - with Phoenix
- Texas Outlaw Promotion
  - TOP Heavyweight Championship (1 time)
- World Wrestling Entertainment
  - WWE Tag Team Championship (3 times) – with Shelton Benjamin (2) and Rico (1)
  - Slammy Award (1 time)
    - Best Impersonation (2008) – The GlamaHaas on Raw, October 27
- Wrecking Ball Wrestling
  - Match of the Year (2011) vs. Low Ki
- WrestleForce
  - WrestleForce World Heavyweight Championship (1 time)
- Xtreme Intense Championship Wrestling
  - XICW Midwest Heavyweight Championship (1 time)
