= Jackie Gayda =

American professional wrestler and valet (born 1981)

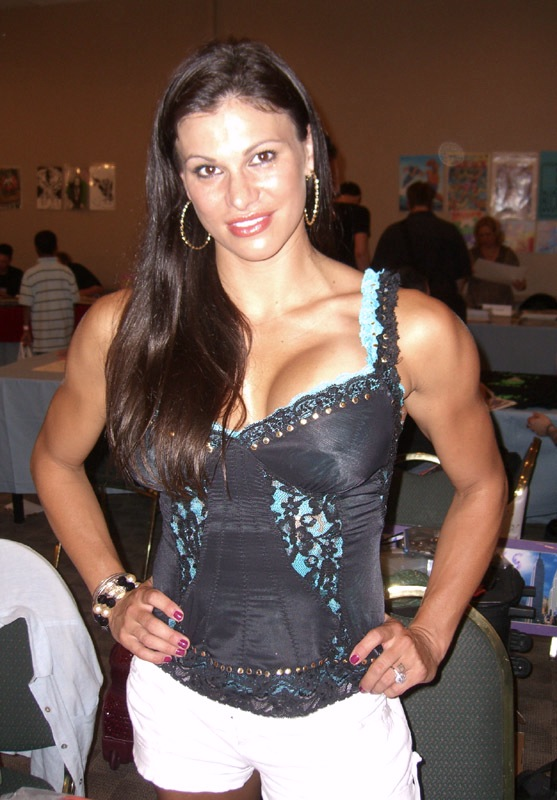
- Gayda in 2009

Personal information
- Born: Jacquelyn Suzanne Gayda; November 3, 1981 (age 45) Strongsville, Ohio, U.S.
- Spouse: Charlie Haas (m. 2005; div. 2020)
- Children: 4

Professional wrestling career
- Ring name(s): Jackie; Jackie Gayda; Just Jackie; Jackie Haas; Miss Jackie
- Billed height: 5 ft 7 in (170 cm)
- Billed weight: 132 lb (60 kg)
- Trained by: Al Snow; Chavo Guerrero Jr. Hardcore Holly; Jacqueline Moore; Charlie Haas
- Debut: 2002
- Retired: 2011

Jacquelyn Suzanne Gayda (born November 3, 1981) is an American retired professional wrestler and valet, best known for her work in World Wrestling Entertainment (WWE) and Total Nonstop Action Wrestling (TNA). She was awarded a contract with WWE after co-winning the second season of the reality television show Tough Enough with Linda Miles.

== Professional wrestling career ==
=== World Wrestling Entertainment (2002–2005) ===
==== Tough Enough and debut (2002–2003) ====
As soon as Gayda was awarded the Tough Enough II contract, she worked several matches on the Raw and SmackDown! brands. Gayda turned villainous on an episode of WWE Velocity by pushing her co-winner Linda Miles off the top rope, causing her to lose her match against Ivory. Five days later on SmackDown!, Gayda teamed up with Ivory in a losing effort against Miles and Trish Stratus in a tag team match. In another one of her first television matches (a tag team match with Christopher Nowinski against Trish Stratus and Bradshaw on the July 8, 2002 episode of Raw from Philadelphia, Pennsylvania, that became known by wrestling fans as "that Jackie Gayda match"), Gayda botched multiple moves, the most infamous of which was a second-rope-bulldog by Stratus, which she sold too late. Commentator Jim Ross exclaimed that "mercifully, it's over" at the end of the match, expressing relief that the poor wrestling attempts had ceased.

She was sent to Ohio Valley Wrestling (OVW) for further training. While in OVW, she joined the stable known as "The Revolution", in addition to managing The Basham Brothers and Chris Kanyon. On June 16, 2003, she returned to WWE as Miss Jackie, managing Rico. She would later turn face after Rico's face turn.

==== Various feuds and SmackDown! (2004–2005) ====
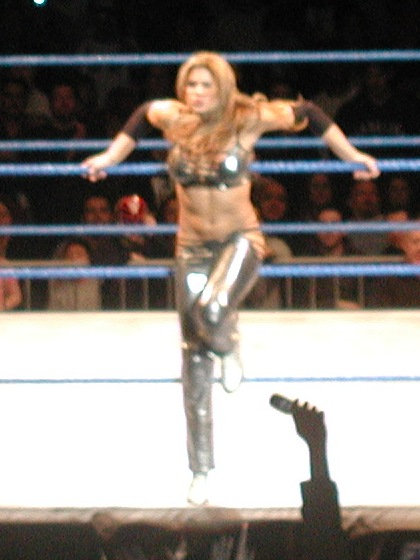
Gayda during a WWE house show in 2005

In early 2004, Gayda teamed up with Stacy Keibler, with the duo proclaiming themselves to be the WWE's hottest divas and thought they deserved to grace the cover of Playboy magazine. This provoked a feud with SmackDown! divas and the Playboy co-cover girls Sable and Torrie Wilson. At WrestleMania XX, Gayda and Keibler were defeated by Sable and Wilson in a Playboy evening gown match.

In the second WWE Draft, Gayda and Rico were traded to SmackDown! brand, where they eventually teamed up with Charlie Haas. In September 2004, Haas and Gayda were engaged, and their relationship was eventually incorporated into their on-screen characters. Dawn Marie announced the engagement of Gayda and Haas on the September 30 episode of SmackDown!, implying in the process that she and Haas were "more than just friends." This led to a catfight between Gayda and Dawn, which in turn led to an intergender tag match at No Mercy pitting Gayda, Haas, and Rico against Dawn and the Dudley Boyz. Gayda's team won the bout, yet Dawn Marie predicted that the relationship would not last very long. From that moment onwards, Dawn Marie tried her hardest to split the couple up. On the October 7 episode of SmackDown!, Gayda found herself on the receiving end of Billy Kidman's BK Bomb. She sold her injuries through the October tour of Europe by wearing a neckbrace, only returning to action on the October 28 episode of SmackDown! in Omaha, Nebraska, which saw Gayda hit the ring during a Halloween costume contest between Dawn and Torrie Wilson, spearing Dawn and tearing the clothes from her body. A vengeful Dawn then screamed to Gayda that it was not over. Dawn gained her revenge during an arm wrestling contest on the November 4 episode of SmackDown!, headbutting Gayda and catfighting with her until Haas made the save. Dawn's ally Heidenreich then decimated Haas, dismissing Gayda's attempts to protect Haas by shoving her to the mat. On November 25, Gayda tried to gain revenge in a "Pilgrim versus Indian" match, but both women were disqualified for ignoring the referee's instructions. The two divas fought once again on December 2, this time while wearing Christmas outfits. General Manager Theodore Long finally announced a final encounter at Armageddon, appointing Haas as the referee. Gayda lost the match, and her fiancé, as the relationship was broken when Haas revealed he had an affair with Dawn Marie. He then rejected Marie afterward, saying he did not want either woman.

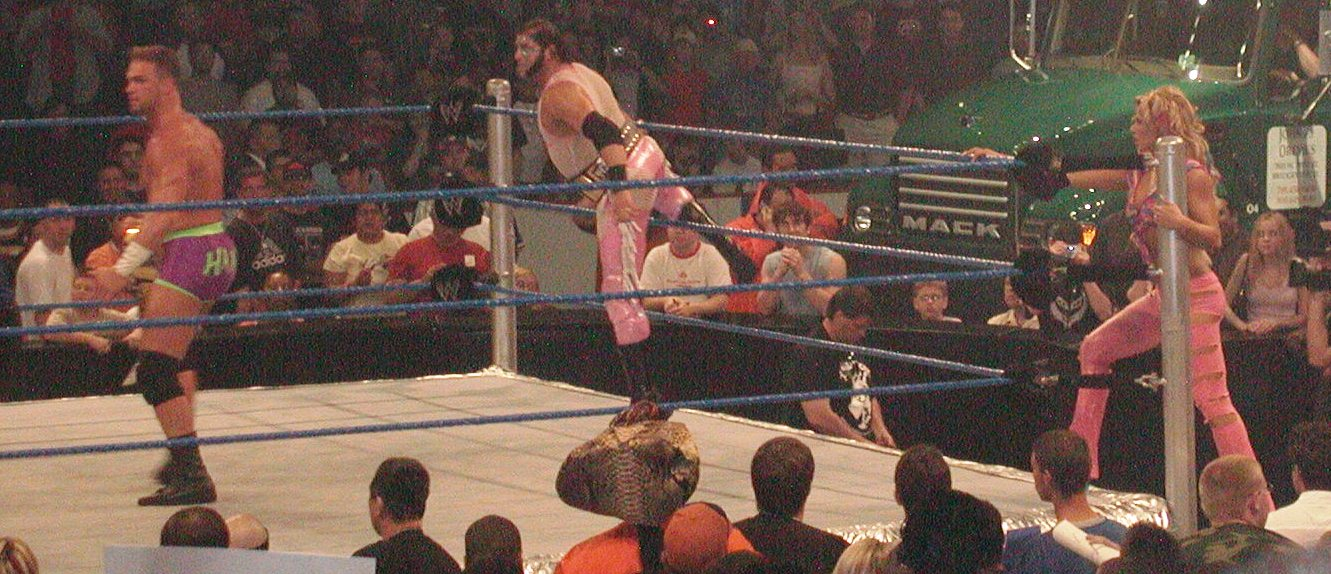
Gayda as Miss Jackie entering the ring while about to valet Rico and Charlie Haas, the then WWE Tag Team Champions, on June 15, 2004

Gayda began wrestling as a singles performer. She appeared in numerous vignettes with the other divas until she and Haas were released from WWE on July 5, 2005, along with many other WWE wrestlers.

=== Independent circuit (2005–2006) ===
Gayda began working for several independent promotions, including Ballpark Brawl, where Gayda was referred to as Just Jackie and defeated Traci Brooks, Nattie Neidhart, Jamie D, and April Hunter on August 13, 2005. She also teamed with Hunter in a loss to Neidhart on August 14, 2005.

=== Total Nonstop Action Wrestling (2005–2006) ===
On the November 26, 2005, episode of Impact!, Gayda made her debut lashing out at Jeff Jarrett. Jarrett was shocked and frightened by Gayda's unexpected appearance and soon ordered her backstage. He was heard saying, "It's not what you think." After being pushed by Jarrett, Gayda slapped him and then went after his valet, Gail Kim. The following week, Gayda came out again to confront Jarrett. After pushing and slapping, the two had to be pulled apart by officials. At Turning Point, the same thing happened in the main event match, but officials restrained Gayda. On the December 31 show, Don West tracked down Gayda for an interview. She said her being there had nothing to do with a love affair, but rather that Jarrett had promised her a spot on the TNA Roster, but while she was stuck at home, she turned on the television to see Kim in her place. She said she had a big secret about Jarrett that TNA Management would love to hear but did not reveal what it was.

Gayda won TNA's Knockout of the Year 2005 on the January 14, 2006, episode of Impact!. At Final Resolution, she ran into Raven after he lost his match. She told him that they had something in common, they were both being screwed by TNA Management. On the January 28 episode of Impact!, Gayda came down to ringside during a Jarrett versus Jay Lethal match to hand an audiotape to Kim. She then left, with a confused Kim soon following.

Jarrett then hired Alex Shelley to videotape Gayda at her home for blackmail. Shelley complied, returning a week later with a videotape. On the February 18, 2006, episode of Impact!, she told Jarrett that he had won and that she would leave. Jarrett refused to comply and used the tape Shelley compiled of Gayda as blackmail to get her to join his stable. Jackie became the manager of Planet Jarrett. She feuded with Gail Kim in mid-2006. At Sacrifice Jackie announced that she was pregnant, so Kim kayfabe fired her. She was later released from her contract and retired.

=== Return to wrestling (2009–2011) ===
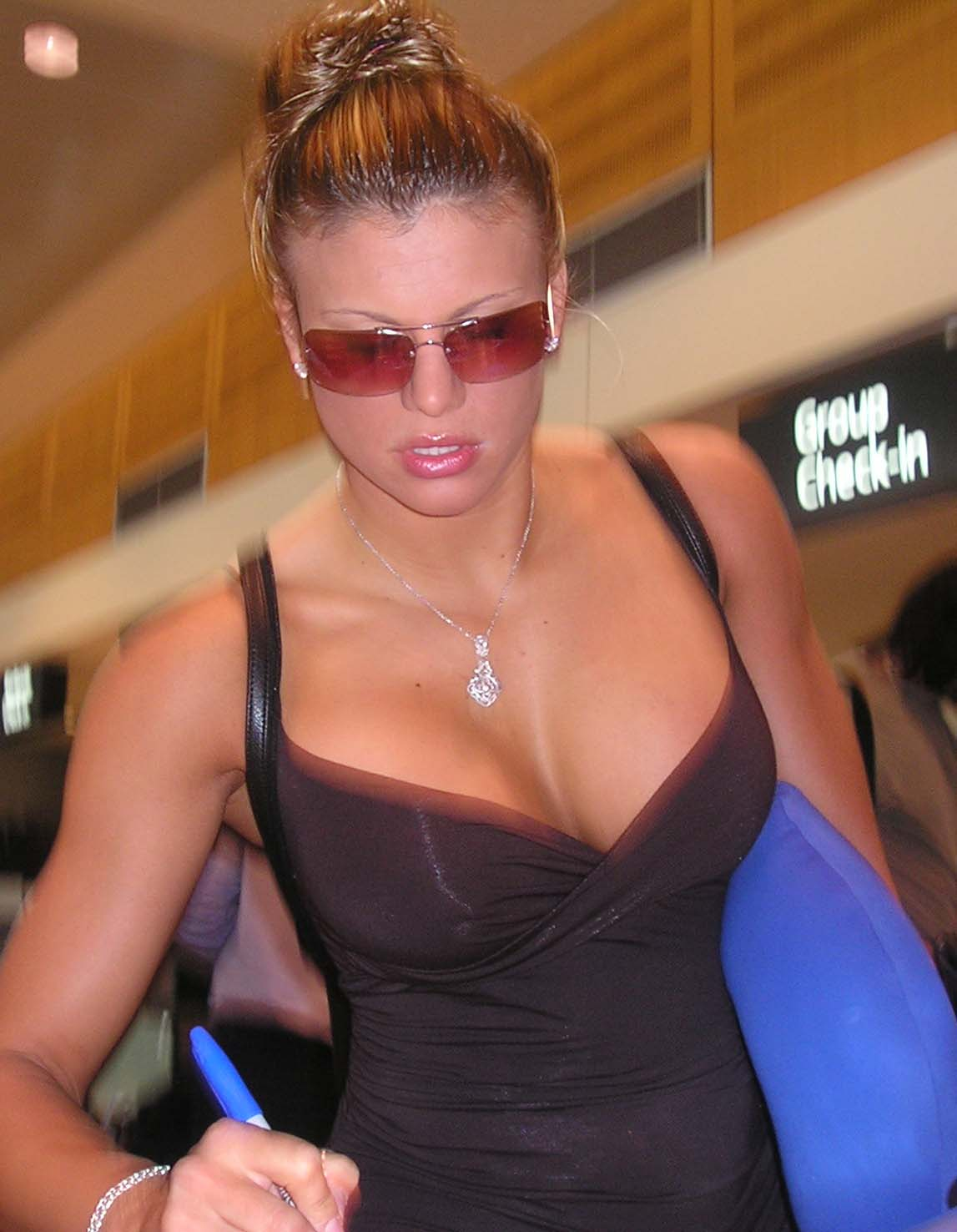
Gayda in September 2008

In April 2009, Gayda returned to WWE for one-night-only as a part of the 25 Diva battle royal at WrestleMania 25.

On August 30, 2010, Mexican promotion Perros del Mal Producciones announced that Gayda, under the ring name Miss Jackie, would wrestle for the promotion on September 16, on the same card as her husband Charlie Haas. At the event Jackie and Celestial defeated Jennifer Blake and Mini Chessman in a tag team match. She appeared again on February 11, 2011, on the Viva La Lucha PPV, teaming with NY Knockout Nikki to take on Christina Von Eerie and Jennifer Blake (a match that she won for her team, via crossbody into a pin). On August 20, 2011, Haas became her husband's manager where he became the inaugural Family Wrestling Entertainment (FWE) Heavyweight Champion by defeating Jay Lethal and Eric Young. He held the championship for four months before losing it to Young on December 17, the same night Jackie made her in-ring debut for FWE in a loss to Winter.

== Personal life ==
Gayda is the sister of former Dayton Flyer baseball legend Joe Gayda. Gayda married fellow professional wrestler Charlie Haas in 2005. The couple have four children: Kayla (born 2006), Taylor (born 2008), Russell (born 2010), and Charles (born 2012). In December 2020, Haas announced that he and Gayda are divorced.

In 2008, Haas and Gayda opened the "Custom Muscle Nutrition and Smoothie Shop", a nutritional store, in Frisco, Texas.

== Filmography ==
=== Television ===
Year	Title	Role	Notes
2002	WWE Tough Enough	Herself	Winner (Season 2)

=== Video games ===
Year	Title	Notes	Ref.
2005	WWE WrestleMania 21	Video game debut	

== Championships and accomplishments ==
- Total Nonstop Action Wrestling
  - TNA Year End Award (1 time)
    - Knockout of the Year (2005)
- World Wrestling Entertainment
  - Tough Enough II – with Linda Miles
