= 1972 in professional wrestling =

1972 in professional wrestling describes the year's events in the world of professional wrestling.

== List of notable promotions ==
These promotions held notable shows in 1972.

Promotion Name	Abbreviation
Big Time Wrestling	BTW
Empresa Mexicana de Lucha Libre	EMLL
National Wrestling Alliance	NWA
National Wrestling Federation	NWF
World Wide Wrestling Federation	WWWF

== Calendar of notable shows ==
Date	Promotion(s)	Event	Location	Main Event
April 21	EMLL	16. Aniversario de Arena México	Mexico City, Mexico	Ray Mendoza defeated David Morgan (c) in a singles match for the NWA World Light Heavyweight Championship
June 24	BTW	Parade of Champions	Irving, Texas	Dory Funk Jr. (c) wrestled Fritz Von Erich to a time-limit draw in a singles match for the NWA World Heavyweight Championship
August 12	NWA/NWF	Superbowl of Wrestling	Cleveland, Ohio	Johnny Powers (c) defeated Johnny Valentine in a singles match for the NWF North American Championship
September 29	EMLL	EMLL 39th Anniversary Show (1)	Mexico City, Mexico	El Solitario and Ray Mendoza defeated Rene Guajardo and Alfonso Dantés in the finals of a tag team tournament
September 30	WWWF	Showdown at Shea	Flushing, New York	Pedro Morales (c) fought Bruno Sammartino to a curfew draw in a singles match for the WWWF World Heavyweight Championship
October 20	EMLL	EMLL 39th Anniversary Show (2)	Mexico City, Mexico	Alfonso Dantés (c) defeated El Solitario in a best two-out-of-three falls match for the NWA World Light Heavyweight Championship
December 8	EMLL	Juicio Final	Mexico City, Mexico	El Solitario defeated Ángel Blanco in a best two-out-of-three falls Lucha de Apuestas, mask Vs. mask match
(c) – denotes defending champion(s)

== Notable events ==
- January 12 – Antonio Inoki created New Japan Pro-Wrestling
- July 1 – The Fabulous Moolah and Vicky Williams became the first female wrestlers to wrestle at Madison Square Garden, which had previously banned women from wrestling in the hallowed venue.
- October 21 Giant Baba created All Japan Pro Wrestling
- Sports Review Wrestling hit the newsstands with its first issue.

== Awards and honors ==
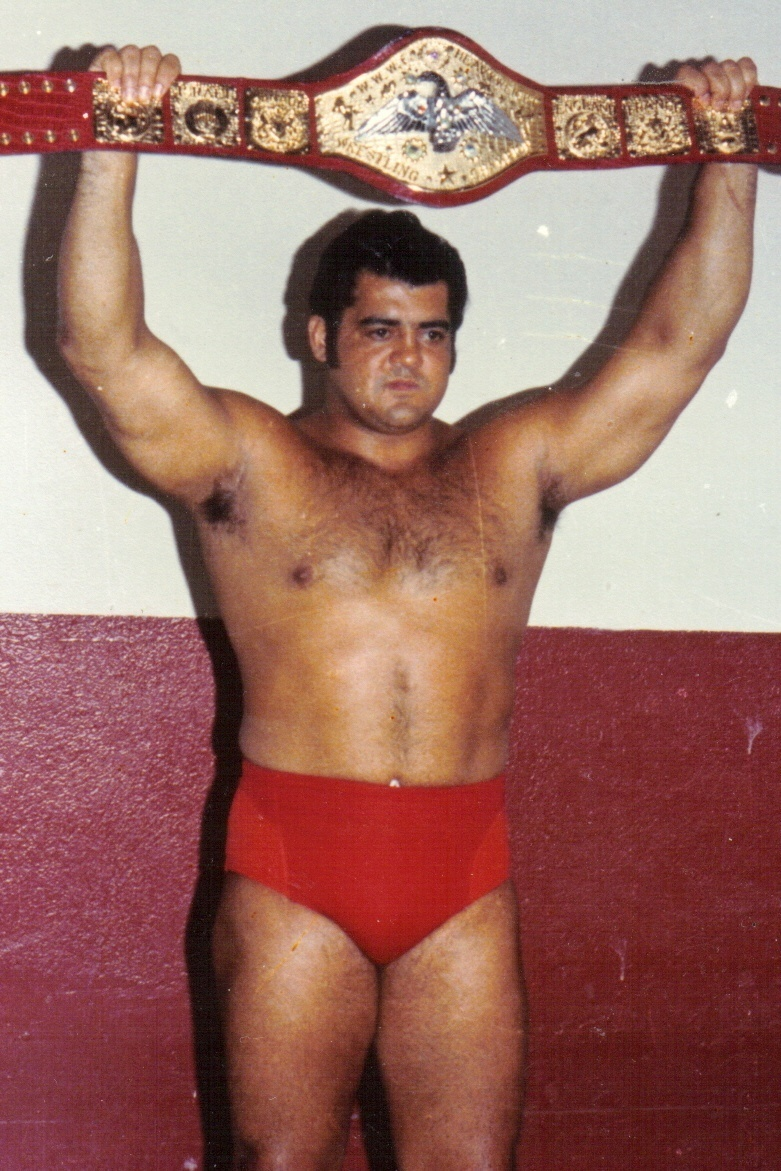
1972 PWI Wrestler of the Year, Pedro Morales

=== Pro Wrestling Illustrated ===
Category	Winner
PWI Wrestler of the Year	Pedro Morales
PWI Tag Team of the Year	Dick the Bruiser and The Crusher
PWI Match of the Year	Bruno Sammartino wins Battle Royal in Los Angeles
PWI Most Popular Wrestler of the Year	Jack Brisco / Fred Curry
PWI Most Hated Wrestler of the Year	The Sheik
PWI Most Inspirational Wrestler of the Year	Lord Alfred Hayes
PWI Rookie of the Year	Mike Graham
PWI Woman of the Year	Marie LaVerne
PWI Midget Wrestler of the Year	Little Bruiser
PWI Manager of the Year	Bobby Heenan

== Championship changes ==
=== EMLL ===
NWA World Light Heavyweight Championship
incoming champion – El Solitario
Date	Winner	Event/Show	Note(s)
March 17	David Morgan	EMLL show	
April 21	Ray Mendoza	EMLL show	
June 13	Alfonso Dantés	EMLL show	

NWA World Middleweight Championship
Incoming champion – Aníbal
No title changes

NWA World Welterweight Championship
Incoming champion – Alberto Munoz
No title changes

Mexican National Heavyweight Championship
Incoming champion – Raul Reyes
Date	Winner	Event/Show	Note(s)
April 7	Angel Blanco	EMLL show	

Mexican National Middleweight Championship
Incoming champion – Ciclon Veloz, Jr.
No title changes

Mexican National Lightweight Championship
Incoming champion – Estrella Blanca
No title changes

Mexican National Light Heavyweight Championship
Incoming champion – Raul Mata
Date	Winner	Event/Show	Note(s)
June 18	Enrique Vera	EMLL show	

Mexican National Welterweight Championship
Incoming champion – Huracan Ramirez
Date	Winner	Event/Show	Note(s)
October 20	Karloff Lagarde	EMLL show	

Mexican National Women's Championship
Incoming champion – Uncertain
No title changes

=== NWA ===
NWA Worlds Heavyweight Championship
Incoming champion – Dory Funk, Jr.
No title changes

== Tournaments ==
=== IWE ===
Accomplishment	Winner	Date won	Notes
IWA World Series	Strong Kobayashi	May 6	

== Births ==
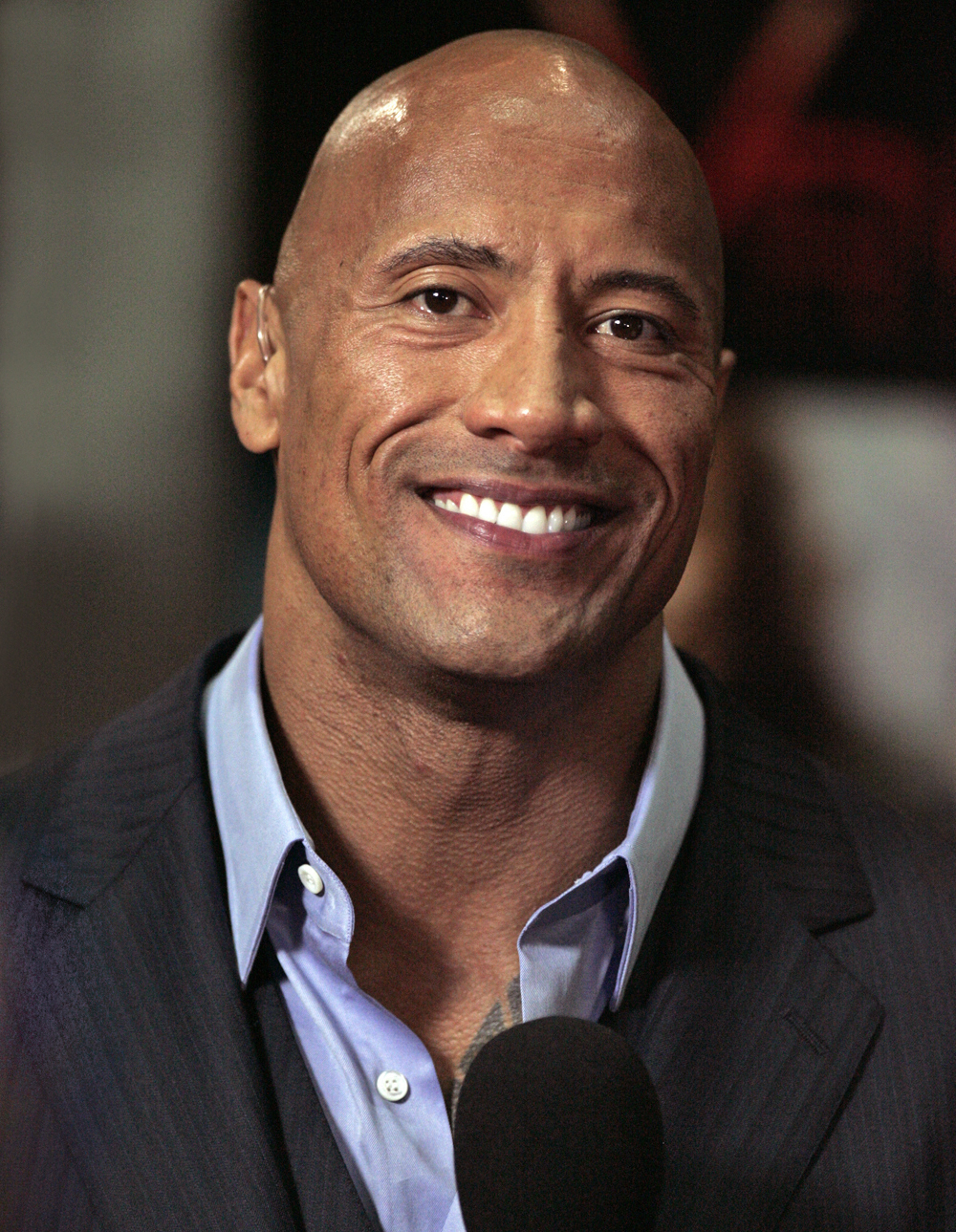
Dwayne Johnson

- January 8 - Jon Andersen
- January 10 – Brian Christopher (died in 2018)
- January 19 – Ron Killings
- January 20 - Tony DeVito
- January 24 - Fabián el Gitano (died in 2011)
- February 1 - Sean Casey
- February 8 – Big Show
- February 19 – Francine
- February 23 - Tomoko Watanabe
- February 28 - Angel Medina
- March 1 - Último Guerrero
- March 6 - Shaquille O'Neal
- March 7 - Major Gunns
- March 12 – Nunzio
- March 21 – Chris Candido (died in 2005)
- March 23 - Octagoncito (AAA)
- March 27 – Charlie Haas
- April 1 - Darren McCarty
- April 11:
  - Balls Mahoney (died in 2016)
  - Kevin Quinn
  - Fyre
- April 14 - Julio Dinero
- April 21 - Dr. Cerebro
- April 28 - Violent J
- April 29 - Masahito Kakihara
- May 2 – Dwayne Johnson
- May 4 - Ray González
- May 17 - Masakazu Fukuda (died in 2000)
- May 25 – Shigeo Okumura
- June 2 - Gary Williams
- June 5 - Mike Bucci
- June 12 - Jack Doan
- June 14 - Jimmy Jannetty
- June 28: - Daniel Gracie
- June 29 – Canyon Ceman
- June 30 - Wolf (died in 2011)
- July 5 - Tatsuhito Takaiwa
- July 13 – X-Pac
- July 21 - Shinjiro Otani
- August 1 – D-Von Dudley
- August 5 - Ikuto Hidaka
- August 19 - Sign Guy Dudley
- August 25 - David Young
- August 27:
  - The Great Khali
  - Jazz
- September 1 - Doug Williams
- September 3 - Bob Evans
- September 5 - Shane Sewell
- September 15 -
  - Lady Victoria
  - Chad Austin
- September 17 – Phantasio
- September 26 - Gabe Sapolsky
- October 1 - Rob Feinstein
- October 4 - Otto Schwanz
- October 12 - Karen Jarrett
- October 16 - Lizmark Jr.
- October 23 - Jasmin St. Claire
- November 7 - Chip Fairway (died in 2011)
- November 14 – Albert
- November 29 - Minoru Tanaka
- November 30 - Ruffy Silverstein (Canadian wrestler)
- December 6 – El Oriental
- December 7 – Tammy Lynn Sytch
- December 20 - Takeshi Rikio
- December 31 - Ryan Sakoda (d. 2021)

== Debuts ==
- February 1, 1972 – El Texano
- March 13, 1972 – Rick Martel
- March 16, 1972 – Gran Hamada
- March 20, 1972 – Mr. Pogo
- May 22, 1972 – Moondog King
- August 2, 1972 – Kengo Kimura
- August 23, 1972 - Bob Orton Jr.
- September – Jaque Mate
- September 1, 1972 – Larry Zbyszko
- September 19, 1972 - Don Arakawa
- September 26, 1972 -Masanobu Kurisu
- November 12, 1972 – Yoshiaki Fujiwara
- December 1, 1972 – Bruce Hart
- December 3, 1972 – Kuniaki Kobayashi
- December 10, 1972 – Ric Flair
- December 28, 1972 – Jim Brunzell
- Debut date uncertain
  - Al Madril
  - Austin Idol
  - Ax
  - Big John Studd
  - Bobby Jaggers
  - Buck Zumhofe
  - El Canek
  - Clem Turner
  - Dutch Mantell
  - Colonel DeBeers
  - George Wells
  - The Iron Sheik
  - Ken Patera
  - Mike Graham
  - Pez Whatley
  - Pierre Lefebvre
  - Scott Casey
  - Sgt. Slaughter
  - Smith Hart
  - Steve Keirn
  - Máquina Salvaje (Mexico)

== Retirements ==
- Johnny Barend (1949 – 1972)
- Angelo Savoldi (1937 – 1972)

== Deaths ==
- January 2 - Jatindra Charan Guho, 79
- February 21 – Luther Lindsay 47
- April 9 - Firpo Zbyszko, 55
- August 1 – Ray Gunkel 48
- September 15 - Billy Sandow, 88
- October 7 - Whitey Caldwell 37
