= Big Dick Dudley Memorial Show =

- Poster of the 2003 event
- Promotion: USA Pro Wrestling
- Date: 2002-2003
- City: Franklin Square, New York, U.S.
- Venue: Franklin Square Firehouse
- Tagline(s): An event to honor an icon!

chronology
← Previous; First	Next → Chris Candido Memorial Show (2005)

The Big Dick Dudley Memorial Show was an annual professional wrestling memorial event produced by the USA Pro Wrestling (USA Pro) promotion, held in 2002 and 2003. The show was held in memory of Big Dick Dudley, who died of kidney failure at his apartment in Copiague, New York on May 16, 2002, with a portion of the proceeds going to his family. A collection from the audience was taken up during the shows as well. The event also served as a reunion show for former alumni of Extreme Championship Wrestling, where Dudley had spent much of his career as a member of The Dudley Brothers, as many appeared at the show to pay their respects.

Predating the Hardcore Homecoming shows of later years, ECW wrestlers that participated were generally those already actively competing in the promotion and elsewhere on the independent circuit. It was also the first of many memorial shows held for former ECW stars followed by the Ted Petty Memorial Invitational Tournament (2002-2008), the Chris Candido Memorial Tag Team Tournament (2005), Chris Candido Memorial Show (2005-2006), Chris Candido Memorial J-Cup (2005-) and the Pitbull/Public Enemy Tag Team Memorial Cup (2006).

== Show results ==
=== First Annual Big Dick Dudley Memorial Show (2002) ===
June 8, 2002 in Franklin Square, New York (Franklin Square Firehouse)

No.	Results	Stipulations
1	Psycho Sam Dudley won the first-annual Big Dick Dudley Memorial battle royal (Note: The other participants included were: Vic D. Vine, Ken Sweeney, Crazy Ivan, Tim Arson, Tyler Payne, Trekkie, Wayne, Iceberg, Dickie Rodz, Brock Vendetta, Wayne, Kid USA, James Hustler, Rev. Zero, Wrecka, Jay Silva, Mike Tobin, and Frankie Starz.)	20-man Big Dick Dudley Memorial Battle Royal
2	Masked Maniac defeated Defcon, Brother James Hustler, Dickie Rodz and Brock Vendetta	Five-Way Elimination match
3	Malice defeated Norman Smiley	Singles match
4	Stormin’ Norman and Larry McKenny defeated The S.A.T. (Joel Maximo and Jose Maximo), The Bad Street Boys (Joey Matthews and Christian York) and Hot Commodity (Chris Hamrick and Julio Dinero)	Four-Way Tag Team match; As per the pre-match stipulation, Stormin’ Norman and Larry McKenny became number-one contenders for the USA Pro Tag Team Championship
5	Low Ki and Xavier defeated Da Hit Squad (Monsta Mack and Mafia) (c) and The Natural Born Sinners (Homicide and Boogaloo)	Three-Way Tag Team match for the USA Pro Tag Team Championship
6	Wayne the Convenience Store Guy, The Trekkie and The Mime defeated The Iceberg, Tim Arson and Damian Dragon	6-man tag team match
7	Chris Chetti defeated Kevin Sullivan via disqualification	Singles match
8	Kid Kash won a gauntlet match involving Matt Striker (with Bobcat), Simon Diamond, Chris Divine, Ghost Shadow, Quiet Storm, Grim Reefer, Brian XL, and Scoot Andrews	Gauntlet match; As per the pre-match stipulation, Kid Kash received a title shot for the USA Pro United States Championship
9	Amazing Red (c) defeated Kid Kash	Singles match for the USA Pro United States Championship
10	Gangrel (with Luna Vachon) defeated Crowbar (with Serina)	Singles match
11	Balls Mahoney (c) defeated Steve Corino	Singles match for the USA Pro Heavyweight Championship
(c) / – the champion(s) heading into the match

=== Second Annual Big Dick Dudley Memorial Show (2003) ===
May 31, 2003 in Franklin Square, New York (Franklin Square Firehouse)

No.	Results	Stipulations
1	The Solution (Havok and Papadon) (with Miss Michelle) defeated Team Target (Devious and Tekno Heat)	Tag Team match
2	Chris Caliber defeated Chewy, Javi-Air and Cody Surekill	Four-Way Elimination match
3	Monsta Mack defeated Prince Nana	Singles match
4	Grim Reefer (c) defeated Deranged	Singles match for the USA Pro Xtreme Championship
5	Tony Lo defeated The Masked Maniac	Singles match
6	Dan Barry defeated Azrieal and Smoked Out	Three-Way Dance
7	James Newblood (with Mr. Big) defeated Johnny TNT	Singles match
8	The Boogie Knights (Danny Drake and Mike Tobin) defeated The Christopher Street Connection (Buff-E and Mace Mendoza)	Tag Team match
9	The S.A.T. (Joel Maximo and Jose Maximo) defeated The Flock (Mikey Whipwreck and Wayne)	Tables, Ladders, and Chairs match
10	Louie Ramos defeated Johnny Bravado	Singles match
11	Tim Arson won the second-annual Big Dick Dudley Memorial battle royal (Note: The other participants included were: Adolph, Bad Boy KRACKA, Chris Caliber, Chewy, Danny Demanto, Danny Drake, Pat Gunner, Jim Hustler, J-Kronik, Javi-Air, Tony Lo, Kevin Matthews, Prince Nana, Poppalicious, Psycho, Rayza, Norman Smiley, Smoked Out, Vinny Stylin', Cody Surekill, Johnny TNT, Mike Tobin and Danny Yamz.)	24-man Big Dick Dudley Memorial Battle Royal
12	Skinhead Ivan (c) defeated Tim Arson (c)	Non-title "Champion vs. Champion" match featuring the USA Pro New York State and USA Pro America's Heavyweight Champions, respectively.
13	Simon Diamond and Matt Striker (with Becky Bayless and Simply Luscious) defeated The Dirty Rotten Scoundrelz (K.C. Blade and E.C. Negro) (c)	Tag Team match for the USA Pro Tag Team Championship
14	Billy Reil defeated Josh Deeley	Singles match
15	Mike Kruel (c) defeated Xavier	Singles match for the USA Pro United States Championship
16	Raven defeated Balls Mahoney (c)	Singles match for the USA Pro Heavyweight Championship
(c) / – the champion(s) heading into the match
