= Chris Candido Memorial Show =

Wrestling event

DVD title screen for the 2005 Chris Candido Memorial Show

The Chris Candido Memorial Show was an annual professional wrestling memorial event produced by the USA Xtreme Wrestling (UXW) promotion and held between 2005 and 2006. The show was held in memory of Chris Candido, who died from a blood clot due to complications from ankle surgery in Matawan, New Jersey on April 28, 2005, with the proceeds and merchandise sales being donated to Candido's late common-law wife and manager Tammy Lynn Sytch and the Chris Candido Scholarship Fund.

== Events ==
Though not the first such event, the show was arguably the biggest gathering of former alumni of Extreme Championship Wrestling prior to the Hardcore Homecoming shows which started that same year. It was also the third major memorial show held for a former ECW star, the second and last one held by UXW, and one of four held for Chris Candido: the Chris Candido Memorial Tag Team Tournament (2005), the Chris Candido Cup Tag Team Tournament (2007-2008) and the Chris Candido Memorial J-Cup (2009). A second Candido Memorial Show was held by the National Wrestling Superstars, another independent promotion Candido wrestled for, during the same time. NWS promoter Joe Panzarino acquired the rights to promote the J-Cup Tournament that same year which was subsequently renamed the Chris Candido Memorial J-Cup.

The first show was later released on DVD by two companies, RF Video and TCTapes.net; Rob Feinstein and Doug Gentry both made public appearances for the event while RF Video provided additional coverage backstage and conducted interviews with wrestlers and other on-screen personalities in attendance including Candido's younger brother Johnny, The Sandman, Mick Foley, Raven, Balls Mahoney (who also performed as a color commentator), Axl Rotten, DeVito, Corporal Robinson, Stephen DeAngelis, Kid Kash, Trinity, Bill Apter and others discussing their memories of Candido. Sean "The Mic" McCaffery, editor-in-chief of DeclarationofIndependents.net, also provided color commentary for TCTapes.net. The show was also promoted on Don Tony's Wrestling Hotline internet radio show by offering those who ordered tickets via Anthony 'Don Tony' DeBlasi and Wrestling-News.com to have their photo be taken with Daffney and be the first fans let into the building before the general public.

While the promotion was praised for its tribute to Candido, who had been a mainstay in USA Xtreme Wrestling since 2001, the memorial shows themselves received mixed reviews from critics. Some of the criticism was due to the length of the shows, which ran roughly four hours, and the last-minute substitutions of local wrestlers in place of bigger stars. This was primarily due to promoter Frank Goodman dropping his policy prohibiting USA Pro wrestlers wrestling "double shots", in which wrestlers worked on more than one show a night, causing many of the bigger stars to arrive late or miss the show entirely. D-Lo Brown, for example, wrestled on two other shows on the night of the Candido's memorial. Several other promotions were running shows on the same night including the New York State Wrestling Federation (NYSWF) in Yonkers, New York, the CyberSpace Wrestling Federation (CSWF) in Wayne, New Jersey, and smaller organizations in Pennsylvania. This, in addition to the heavy inbound traffic to Long Island, resulted in more than half the regular roster being absent a half-hour before showtime. It also meant last-minute changes to the card, substituting opponents with local wrestlers or dropping other matches altogether, as Crowbar, "Lowlife" Louie Ramos, Mana the Polynesian Warrior, Billy Reil, Sonny Siaki, Sabu, and Xavier were all unable to make the show. Similarly, Axl Rotten, Sabu and Big Van Vader were scheduled to be on the second show but failed to appear as did UXW sound technician and referee Pat Savino, whose wife had gone into child labor earlier that night, meaning wrestlers were not provided with entrance music.

Among the reviews, GumGod.com's Matt Dawgs called the first event "one of the best UXW shows ever assembled" while Peter Kent of 411mania.com referred to the show as "torture" and gave the show a rating of 1 out of 5. In his review of the second event, John Lynch of DeclarationofIndependents.net wrote the event "seemingly marked the end of one era in UXW and the beginning of another" as many of the promotion's former ECW stars were likely to leave the promotion to join World Wrestling Entertainment's newly formed ECW brand.

== Show results ==
=== First Annual Chris Candido Memorial Show (2005) ===
May 21, 2005 in Old Bethpage, New York (Skate Safe America)

No.	Results	Stipulations
1	Johnny Candido (with Tammy Lynn Sytch) won the first-annual Candido Cup Battle Royal last eliminating Balls Mahoney (Note: The final two participants were required to win either by pin or submission. The other participants included were: Alere Little Feather, Big Jay, Blade Michaels, Brolly, Buff-E, Candy, Danny Demanto, DeVito, Eddie Guapo, Equalizer, Greatness, Heavy Metal, Jimmy Hustler, Johnny Bravado, Johnny TNT, Ken Sweeney, Mace Mendoza, Matt Lariat, Mercenary, Mike Campbell, Ron Sampson, Sean Sanchez, Slugger, The New Dynamite Kid, and Tony Lo.)	26-man Candido Cup Battle Royal
2	Poppalishus (with Matt Da Angry Young Man) defeated Oman Tortuga	Singles match
3	Billy Gunn defeated Justin Credible	Singles match
4	Axl Rotten defeated Corporal Robinson	Hardcore match
5	Mike Kruel defeated Andy Douglas	"Candido Protege" match for the vacant UXW United States Championship; Candido had been the reigning champion at the time of his death and both men were later handpicked by Tammy Lynn Sytch, having been both mentored by Candido, to wrestle for the title.
6	Elix Skipper (c) defeated Kid Kash	Singles match for the UXW X-Treme Championship
7	Simply Luscious (with Johnny Diamond) defeated Alere Little Feather	Singles match
8	The Greatest Masked Wrestlers Of All Time (Masked Maniac and Shark Boy) defeated The Christopher Street Connection (Buff E and Mace Mendoza)	Tag Team match
9	CM Punk defeated Ian Rotten	Singles match
10	Knight Life (Mike Tobin and Trent Acid) (with Justin Credible) defeated The Solution (Papadon and Havok) (c) (with John Shane)	Tag Team match for the UXW Tag Team Championship; As per the pre-match stipulation, The Solution was forced to break-up and face each other at the next show.
11	Balls Mahoney (c) defeated D-Lo Brown	Singles match for the UXW Heavyweight Championship
12	The Sandman defeated Raven	Raven's Rules match with special guest referee Mick Foley
(c) / – the champion(s) heading into the match

=== Second Annual Chris Candido Memorial Show (2006) ===
May 20, 2006 in Old Bethpage, New York (Skate Safe America)

No.	Results	Stipulations
1	Malta The Destroyer defeated Xena	Singles match
2	Bison Bravado (c) defeated Mike Tobin	Singles match for the UXW New York State "Philly" Championship with special guest referee Tony Lo
3	Xavier defeated Elix Skipper	Singles match
4	The Christopher Street Connection (Buff-E and Mace Mendoza) defeated Wacky Wayne and Ron Sampson	Tag Team match
5	Monsta Mack and Havok (c) defeated Christopher Street Connection (Buff-E and Mace Mendoza)	Tag Team match for the UXW Tag Team Championship
6	Mr. Big defeated Johnny Diamond (with Diamond Vixxxen)	Tuxedo match
7	Little Greatness defeated Dan and Brandon Resto	Singles match
8	Ghanda Rhea Akbar (with Ali Baba) won the second-annual Chris Candido Memorial Battle Royal by eliminating Johnny Candido (Note: The final two participants were required to win either by pin or submission. The other participants included were: Billy Reil, Team Puerto Rico, Wacky Wayne, Buff-E and Mace Mendoza, Ron Sampson, Tony Lo, Mike Tobin, Bison Bravado, Greatness, Monsta Mack, Havok, and Alex Armani among others.)	Chris Candido Memorial Battle Royal
9	Louie Ramos defeated High Life Louie (with Anthony 'Don Tony' DeBlasi)	Singles match
10	The New Dynamite Kid defeated Masked Maniac and Ken Sweeney (with Mr. Big)	Three-Way Dance
11	Crowbar (with Daffney) defeated Sinister X	Singles match
12	King Kong Bundy (with Kenny Casanova) defeated Jake "The Snake" Roberts	Legends match
13	Trent Acid (c) defeated Balls Mahoney	Title Unification match for the UXW United States Championship and the UXW X-Treme Championship
14	Mike Kruel defeated Billy Kryptonite (with Mr. Big)	Singles match
15	Trent Acid (c - UXW Xtreme) defeated Raven (c - UXW Heavyweight), Nick Berk, Johnny Candido, The Sandman and Steve Corino	8-Ball Challenge Title Unification match for the UXW X-Treme Championship and the UXW Heavyweight Championship
(c) / – the champion(s) heading into the match
