= EMLL 39th Anniversary Show =

EMLL 39th Anniversary Show may refer to:

- EMLL 39th Anniversary Show (1), a professional wrestling major show on September 29, 1972, in Arena México Mexico City, Mexico
- EMLL 39th Anniversary Show (2), a professional wrestling major show on October 20, 1972, in Arena México Mexico City, Mexico
