= RF Video =

American professional wrestling video distribution company

RF Video Inc.
- Type: Private
- Industry: Home video; Professional wrestling
- Genre: Professional wrestling Video distribution
- Founded: 2001
- Founder: Rob Feinstein
- Headquarters: Langhorne, Pennsylvania, United States
- Area served: Global
- Owner: Rob Feinstein
- Website: rfvideo.com

RF Video is a professional wrestling home video distribution company owned by Rob Feinstein who would later form Ring of Honor. The company now operates as a video-on-demand digital streaming platform.

== History ==
Prior to 2001, Rob Feinstein had been involved in tape trading in the professional wrestling community, often distributing fan cam footage of various shows including Extreme Championship Wrestling (ECW) events under the RF Video name with Gabe Sapolsky being one of the most notable employees to film fan cam footage for Feinstein. Feinstein also distributed footage from smaller independent promotions in the Northeast including Jersey Championship Wrestling (JCW), Jersey All Pro Wrestling (JAPW), and Combat Zone Wrestling (CZW) along with footage from international promotions in Japan and Mexico. After the closure of ECW, RF Video was formally incorporated in on August 16 and began releasing its catalog commercially beginning with a shoot interview with Gangstas members New Jack and Mustafa, something that the company would be credited for pioneering. In 2002, Feinstein formed his own wrestling promotion named Ring of Honor with their home video releases of various made-for-DVD/VHS events being the company's exclusive flagship product. ROH held their first show titled The Era of Honor Begins on February 23, 2002 with footage of the event being released in the Spring of that year by RF Video.

In early 2004, Rob Feinstein, RF Video's owner, had resigned after he had been caught in a sting operation after sexually chatting with who he believed to be a 14-year-old boy, who was later revealed to be a Perverted-Justice decoy. A WCAU news crew attempted to confront him but he had ran to his vehicle and sped away from the scene. Feinstein shortly after resigned from his role as owner of Ring of Honor and RF Video but was not criminally charged for his role in the incident and later regained control over RF Video. Feinstein's stake in Ring of Honor would later be sold to Doug Gentry and later to Cary Silkin.
