= Juicio Final (1972) =

Mexican professional wrestling event

- Promotion: Empresa Mexicana de Lucha Libre
- Date: December 8, 1972
- City: Mexico City, Mexico
- Venue: Arena México

Event chronology
← Previous; EMLL 39th Anniversary Show	Next → EMLL 40th Anniversary Show

Juicio Final chronology
← Previous; 1970	Next → 1974

Juicio Final (1972) (Spanish for "Final Judgement" 1972) was a professional wrestling supercard show, scripted and produced by Consejo Mundial de Lucha Libre (CMLL), which took place on December 8, 1972, in Arena México, Mexico City, Mexico. The show served as the year-end finale for CMLL before Arena México, CMLL's main venue, closed down for the winter for renovations and to host Circo Atayde. The shows replaced the regular Super Viernes ("Super Friday") shows held by CMLL since the mid-1930s.

Sources indicate that the 1972 Juicio Final match was sold out and that EMLL had to turn away thousands of fans wanting to buy tickets. The main event that drew the sellout crowd was a Lucha de Apuesta of friends-turned-rivals El Solitario and Ángel Blanco as they both risked their masks on the outcome of the match. The match helped establish El Solitario's position as a top wrestler as he defeated Ángel Blanco. Afterwards Ángel Blanco unmasked and revealed that his birthname was Jose Ángel Vargas Sanchez. The show featured five additional matches.

== Production ==
=== Background ===
For decades Arena México, the main venue of the Mexican professional wrestling promotion Consejo Mundial de Lucha Libre (CMLL), would close down in early December and remain closed into either January or February to allow for renovations as well as letting Circo Atayde occupy the space over the holidays. As a result, CMLL usually held a "end of the year" supercard show on the first or second Friday of December in lieu of their normal Super Viernes show. 1955 was the first year where CMLL used the name "El Juicio Final" ("The Final Judgement") for their year-end supershow. It is no longer an annually recurring show, but instead held intermittently sometimes several years apart and not always in the same month of the year either. All Juicio Final shows have been held in Arena México in Mexico City, Mexico which is CMLL's main venue, its "home".

=== Storylines ===
The 1972 Juicio Final show featured sixprofessional wrestling matches scripted by CMLL with some wrestlers involved in scripted feuds. The wrestlers portray either heels (referred to as rudos in Mexico, those that play the part of the "bad guys") or faces (técnicos in Mexico, the "good guy" characters) as they perform.

== Results ==
No.	Results	Stipulations
1	Mano Alcala and Rubi Ruvalcaba defeated Atila and Tino Herrera	Tag team match
2	El Cobarde defeated Cesar Silva	Singles match
3	Fishman defeated El Marquez	Singles match
4	Cesar Valentino and Dr. Wagner defeated Enrique Vera and Raul Mata	Tag tea match
5	Aníbal defeated Rene Guajardo	Singles match
6	El Solitario defeated Ángel Blanco	Best two-out-of-three falls Lucha de Apuestas, mask Vs. mask match
