= Billy Reil =

American professional wrestler (1979–2024)

Personal information
- Born: June 19, 1979 Philadelphia, Pennsylvania, U.S.
- Died: April 29, 2024 (aged 44)

Professional wrestling career
- Ring name(s): Billy Reil; Backyard Billy
- Billed height: 6 ft 0 in (1.83 m)
- Billed weight: 205 lb (93 kg)
- Trained by: Reckless Youth; New Jack; Mike Kehner
- Debut: May 19, 1995

Billy Reil (June 19, 1979 – April 29, 2024) was an American professional wrestler who worked primarily the Northeastern Independent circuit in the United States. A longtime veteran of the Tri-State area, he was a mainstay of Jersey All Pro Wrestling during the late 1990s.

Reil was also a guest writer for wrestling websites such as Wrestling-News.com, most notably his "Reil World" and "Billy Reil Uncut" columns. Reil was also a classically trained actor, having starred in films such as "Purgatory" and "The Pit".

== Biography ==
=== Early life and career ===
Born in South Philadelphia, Pennsylvania, Reil was a wrestling fan growing up and often attended World Wrestling Federation events at The Spectrum during the late 1980s. As a teenager, he began hanging out at the ECW Arena attempting to make contacts in the professional wrestling business and eventually met Angel Orsini, who then introduced Reil to Reckless Youth. He soon made his in-ring debut on May 19, 1995 in a match against his childhood friend Trent Acid. During the summer of 1996, Reil began training with The Pit Bulls before leaving for college the following year.

=== Jersey All Pro Wrestling and the independents ===
Reil continued to wrestle and was honing his craft working in Jersey All Pro Wrestling, the National Wrestling Alliance (NWA) New Jersey territory, and Grande Wrestling Alliance.

He would team with Trent Acid to defeat Homicide and Kane D for the JAPW Tag Team titles in Bayonne, New Jersey, on January 29, 1999. The two would defend the titles for a month before losing the titles to The Big Unit (Dave Desire and Rick Silver) on February 26, 1999.

Reil attended Dory Funk, Jr.'s Dojo in 1999. By 2000, Reil had gained a considerable following in the Northeastern United States and had notable matches including a 3-way dance against Sabu and Low Ki on April 7, 2000.

Later that year, while wrestling at an event for the Central Wrestling Coalition, Reil suffered a separated shoulder and neck injuries in a match against Breaker Morant in South Philadelphia in November.

=== Later years & Death ===
During the next two years he would continue competing in independent promotions including Frank Goodman's UXW teaming with Mike Tobin as "Knight Life" to defeat the Christopher Street Connection for the vacant UXW Tag Team titles on April 15, 2005 and was scheduled to defend their titles against Papadon and Havok, the Solution at the Chris Candido Memorial Show in Long Island, New York on May 21 however Reil failed to show up for the event. During the show, Reil's partners Mike Tobin and Trent Acid criticized Reil during an interview in which they mentioned his staged retirement via the Internet earlier that year and introduced Trinity and Justin Credible to the "Knight Life" stable.

The following year at an event for National Wrestling Superstars, Reil defeating Corey Havoc, Dan Petit and J.R. in a Four-Way Jobbers Match on December 29, 2006.

Throughout this period of his legendary wrestling career, Reil began acting and appeared in films such as "Purgatory", "In the O-Zone", "Cord Jumpers 2", and "Shakespeare & Steve".

In January 2007, he began feuding with Danny Demanto and, while their first encounter on January 26 resulted in a no contest, Reil defeated Demanto and Bison Bravado in a tag team match with Jim Neidhart the following day. The following month, in a match for the vacant UXW X-Treme Championship, he would participate in a 7-way match with Chasyn Rance, Kirby Mack, T.J. Mack, Naphtali, Greatness, Jerrelle Clark later losing to Kirby Mack in Orlando, Florida on February 24.

In February 2016, Reil announced he was planning a comeback to the ring, citing he could still keep up with today's talent pool. He made his comeback and final wrestling match two months later, during the 2016 Jersey All Pro Wrestling Homecoming event on April 30, 2016, which he lost in a Battle Royal match to Andrew "Magic" Morgan.

Reil died on April 29, 2024, at the age of 44. He had been dealing with an undisclosed health issues a year prior to his death.

== Championships and accomplishments ==
- Grande Wrestling Alliance
  - GWA Cruiserweight Championship (2 times)
- Independent Superstars of Professional Wrestling
  - ISPW Light Heavyweight Championship (2 times)
- Jersey All Pro Wrestling
  - JAPW Light Heavyweight Championship (3 times)
  - JAPW Tag Team Championship (1 time) - with Trent Acid
- Pro Wrestling Illustrated
  - PWI ranked him #430 of the 500 best singles wrestlers of the PWI 500 in 2000
- Trademark Wrestling
  - TMF Cruiserweight Championship (1 time)
- USA Pro Wrestling
  - USA Pro United States Championship (1 time)
  - USA Pro Tag Team Championship (1 time) with Mike Tobin
