= List of Ring of Honor personnel =

Personnel for the American wrestling promotion Ring of Honor

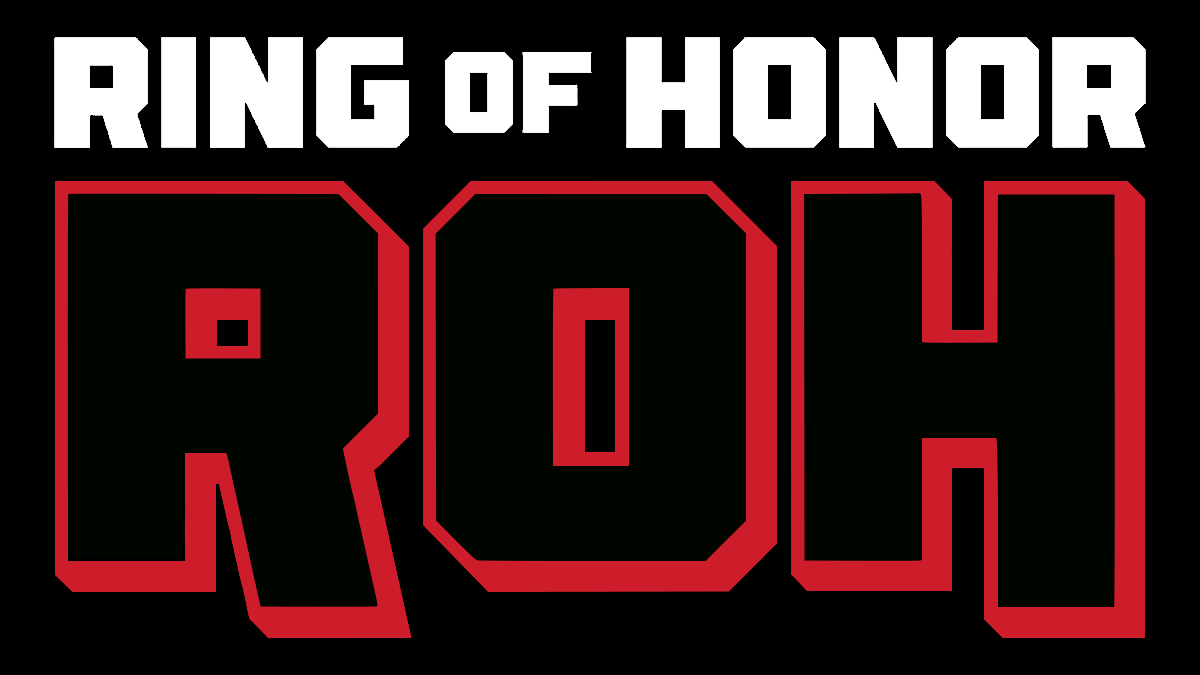

The following is a list of professional wrestlers, referees, announcers, and other personnel who currently work for Ring of Honor (ROH), a wrestling promotion owned by Tony Khan.

Employees and management listed are organized according to their role in the company. The ring name of each employee appears in the first column, while their real name is in the second column.

Wrestlers from ROH's sister promotion All Elite Wrestling (AEW) and partner promotions New Japan Pro-Wrestling (NJPW) and Consejo Mundial de Lucha Libre (CMLL) may also make periodic appearances on ROH programming.

== Roster ==
=== Men's division ===
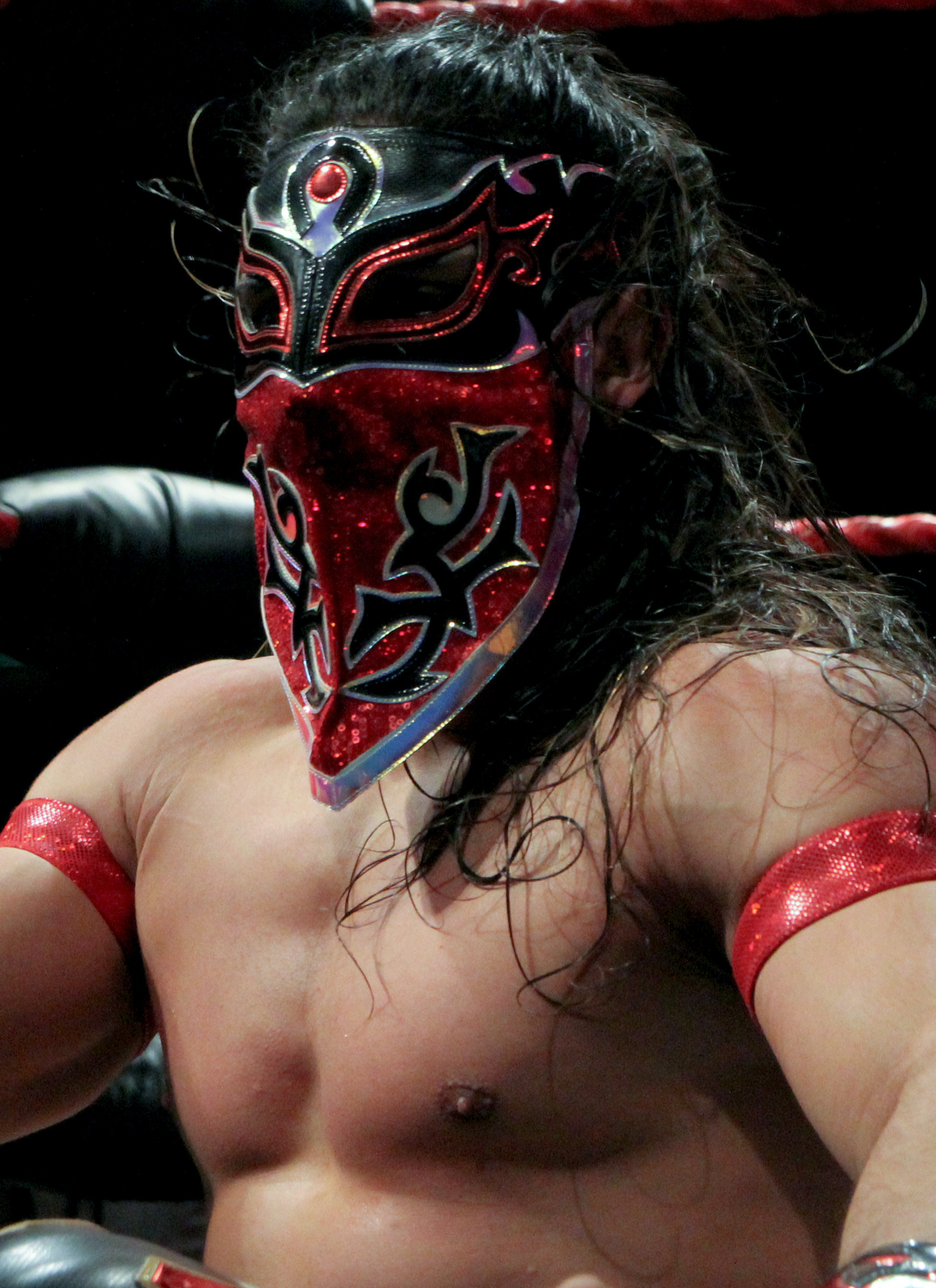
Bandido

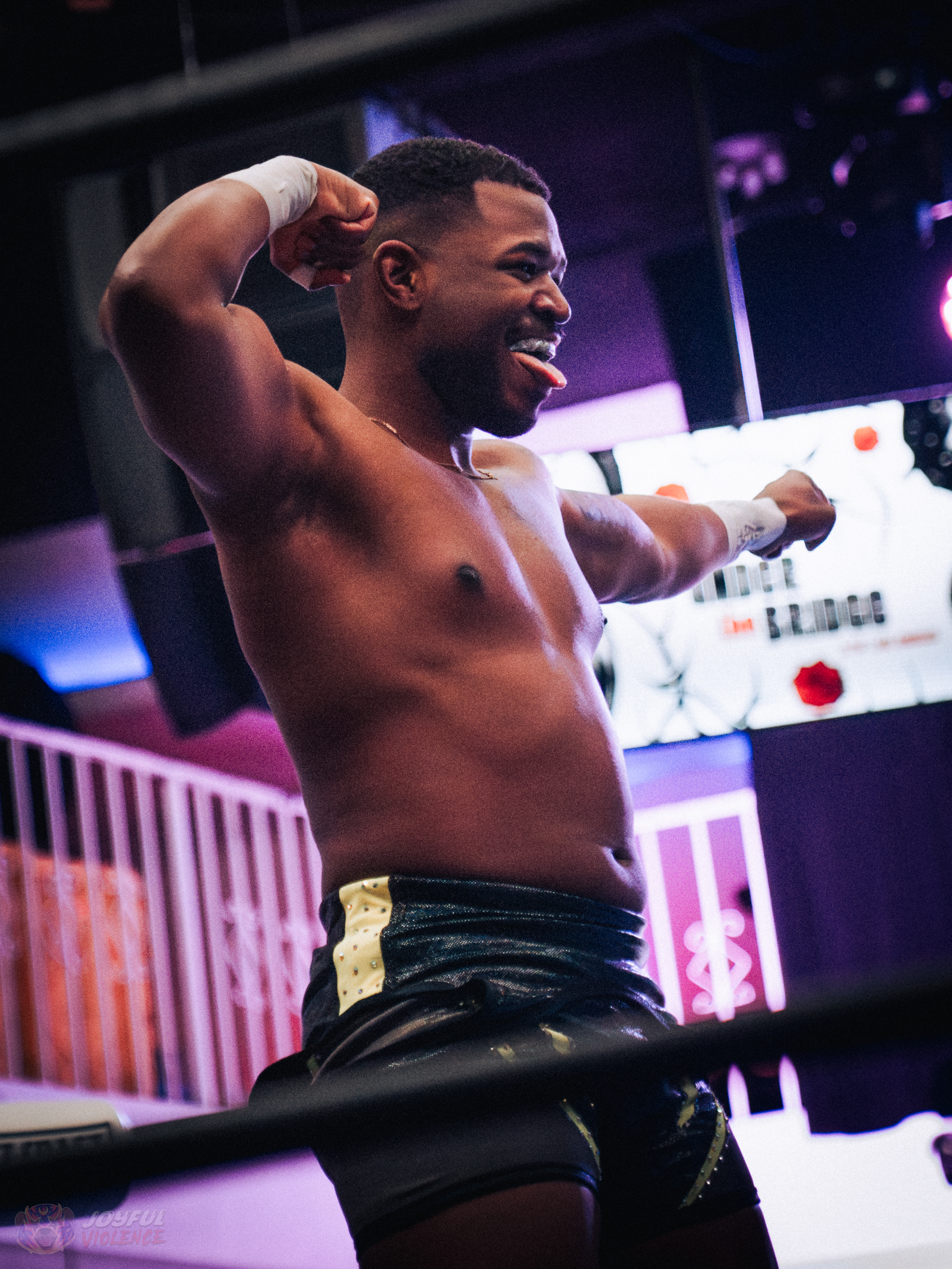
Lee Moriarty

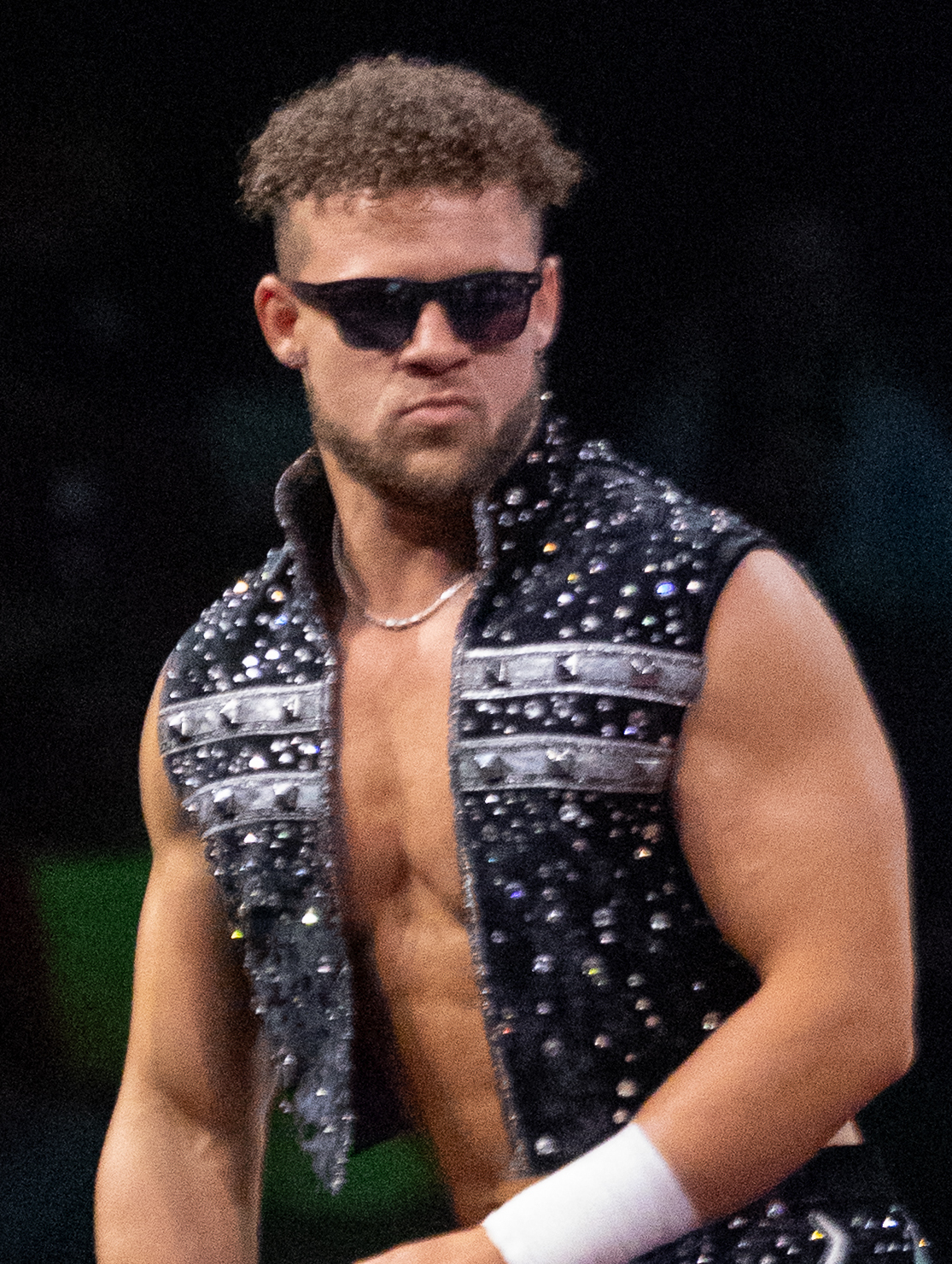
Action Andretti

Máscara Dorada

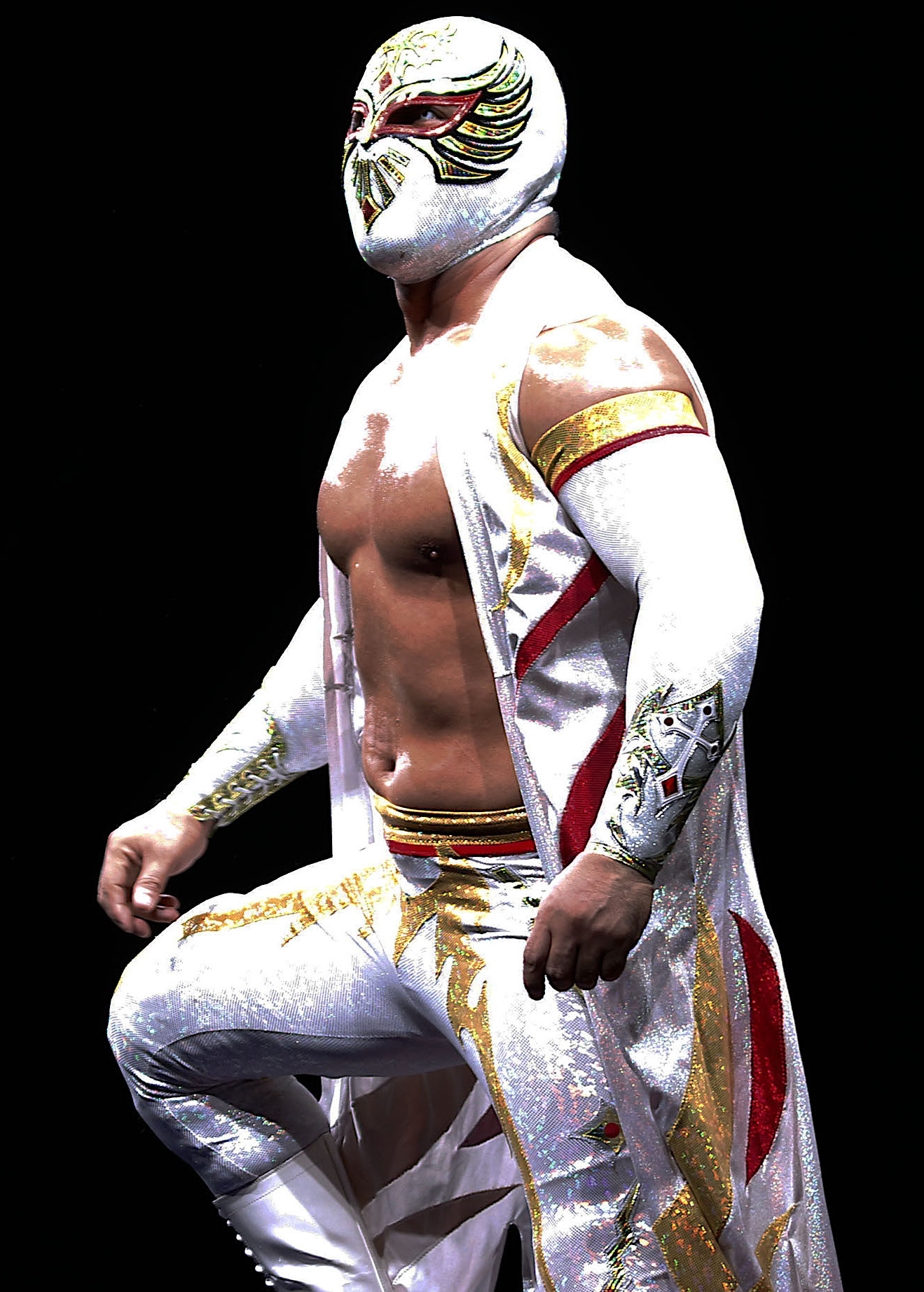
Místico

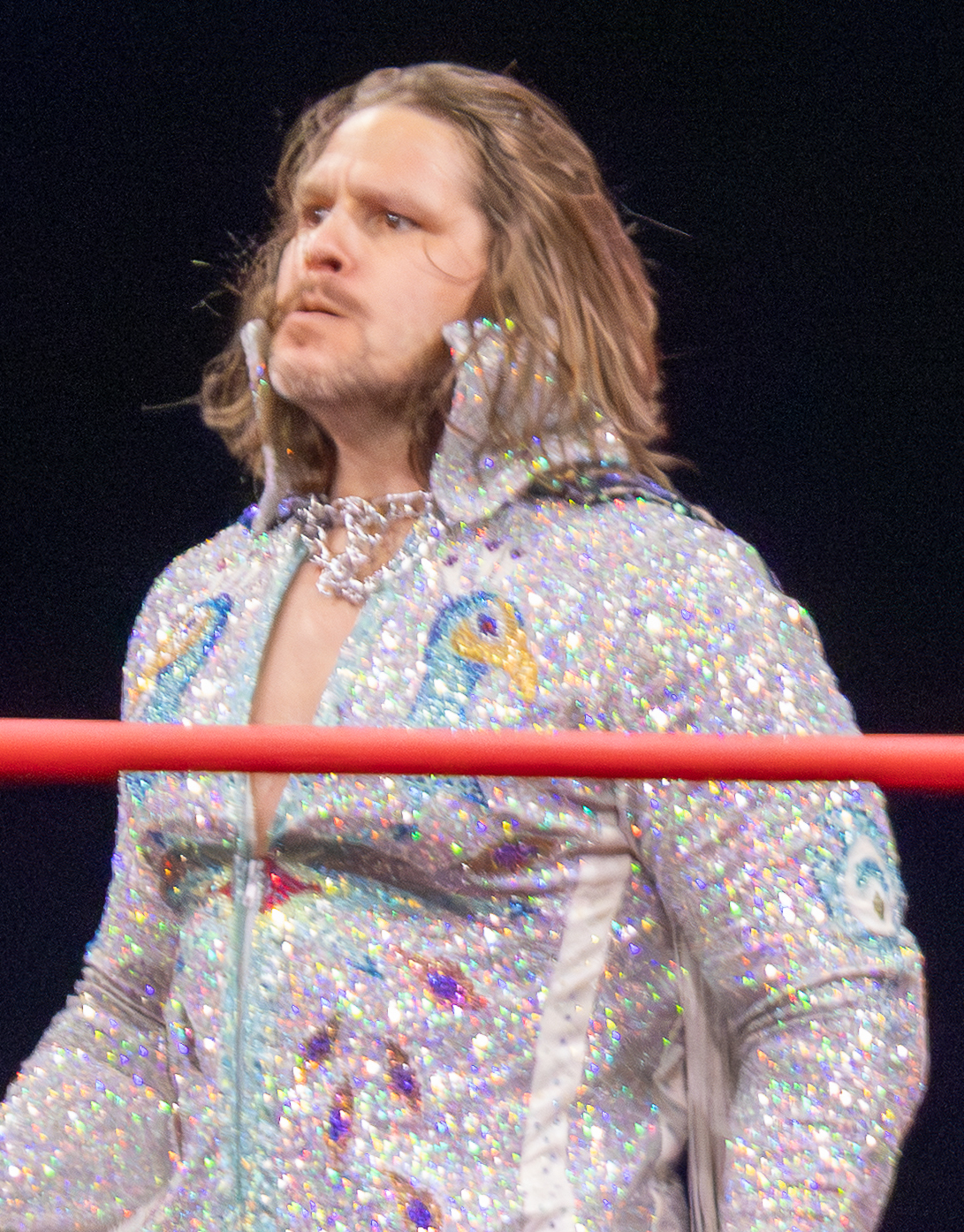
Dalton Castle

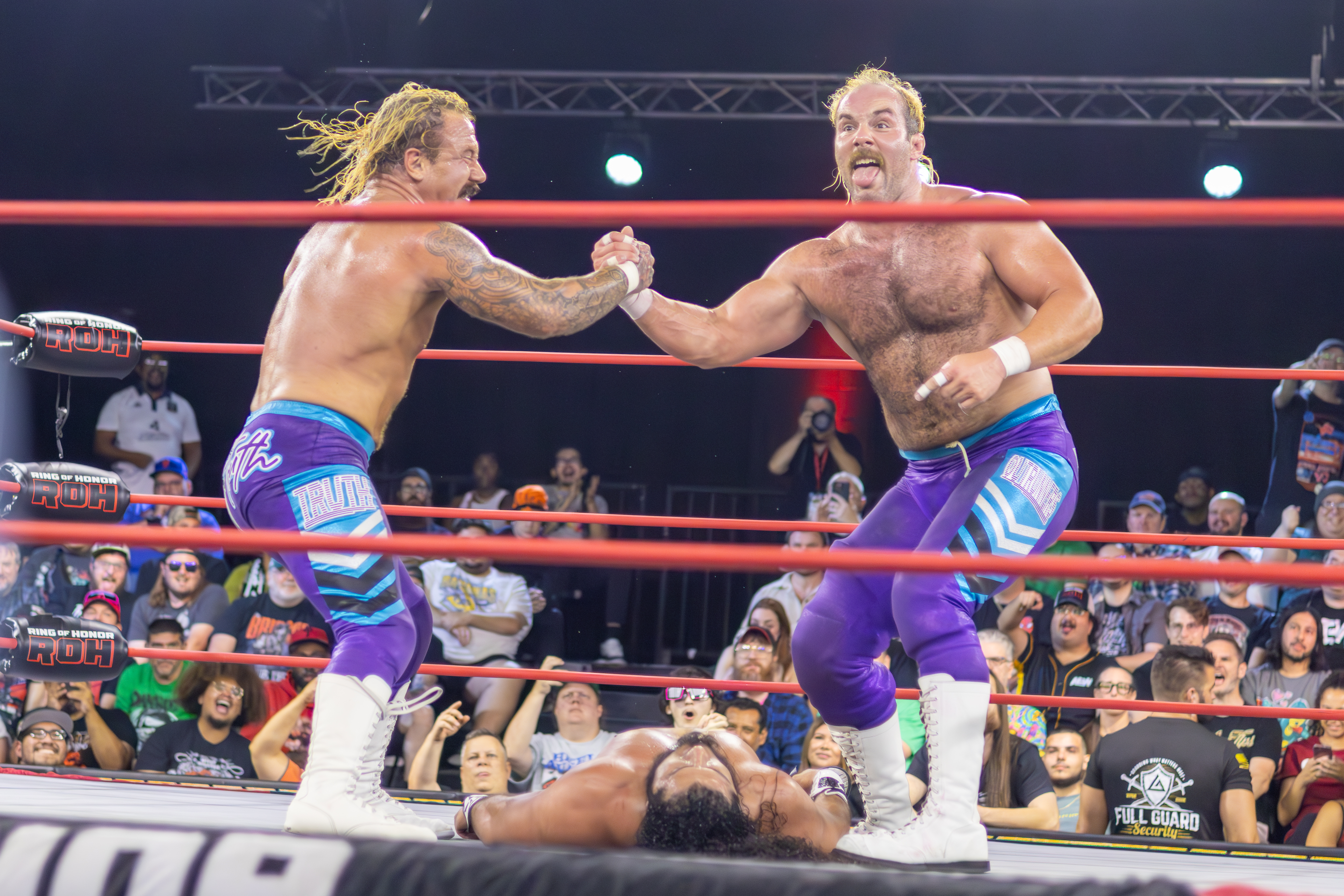
The Outrunners

Ring name	Real name	Notes
Action Andretti	Tyler Reber	World Television Champion
Angélico	Adam Bridle	Coach
Anthony Henry	Anthony Henry	
AR Fox	Thomas James Ballester	
Ariya Daivari	Ariya Daivari	Coach
Bandido	Undisclosed (Note: Per longstanding lucha libre tradition, the true identity, birth name etc. of masked wrestlers is kept secret from the general public. News media neither report nor speculate on real names even if they may be able to find them.)	World Champion
Blake Christian	Christain Hubble	
Brian Cage	Brian Button	
Capt. Shawn Dean	Shawn McBride	
Carlie Bravo	Unknown	
Cole Karter	Cole McKinney	
Dalton Castle	Brett Giehl	World Six-Man Tag Team Champion
Dezmond Xavier	Deveon Aikens	Member of The Rascalz
Dustin Rhodes	Dustin Runnels	
Eddie Colón	Edwin Colón Coates	Freelancer; Member of The Colóns
Eddie Kingston	Edward Moore	
Griff Garrison	Garrett Griffith	
Jacked Jameson	Jameson Ryan	
JD Drake	David Drake	
Johnny TV	John Hennigan	
Komander	Undisclosed	
Lee Johnson	Lee Johnson	
Lee Moriarty	Julian Moriarty	Pure Champion
Lio Rush	Lionel Gerard Green	
Mansoor	Mansoor Al-Shehail	
Mark Briscoe	Mark Pugh	Hall of Famer
Marshall Von Erich	Marshall Adkisson	
Máscara Dorada II	Unknown	World Tag Team Champion
Mason Madden	Brennan Williams	
Mike Bennett	Michael Bennett	
Mikey Nicholls	Michael Nicholls	Freelancer; Member of TMDK
Místico	Luis Ignacio Urive Alvirde	World Tag Team Champion
Myron Reed	Unknown	Member of The Rascalz
Nick Wayne	Nicholas Finley	
Orlando Colón	Orlando Colón Nieves	Freelancer; Member of The Colóns
Ortiz	Miguel Molina	
Ross Von Erich	Ross Adkisson	
Rush	William Muñoz González	
Sammy Guevara	Samuel Guevara	
Serpentico	Jonathan Cruz Rivera	
Shane Haste	Shane Veryzer	Freelancer; Member of TMDK
Shane Taylor	Mark Shepherd	
Tehuti Miles	Tehuti Miles	
The Beast Mortos	Undisclosed	
Tony Nese	Anthony Nese	Coach
Truth Magnum	Unknown	World Six-Man Tag Team Champion
Turbo Floyd	Unknown	World Six-Man Tag Team Champion
Wheeler Yuta	Paul Gruber	
Zachary Wentz	Zachary Green	Member of The Rascalz

=== Women's division (Women of Honor) ===
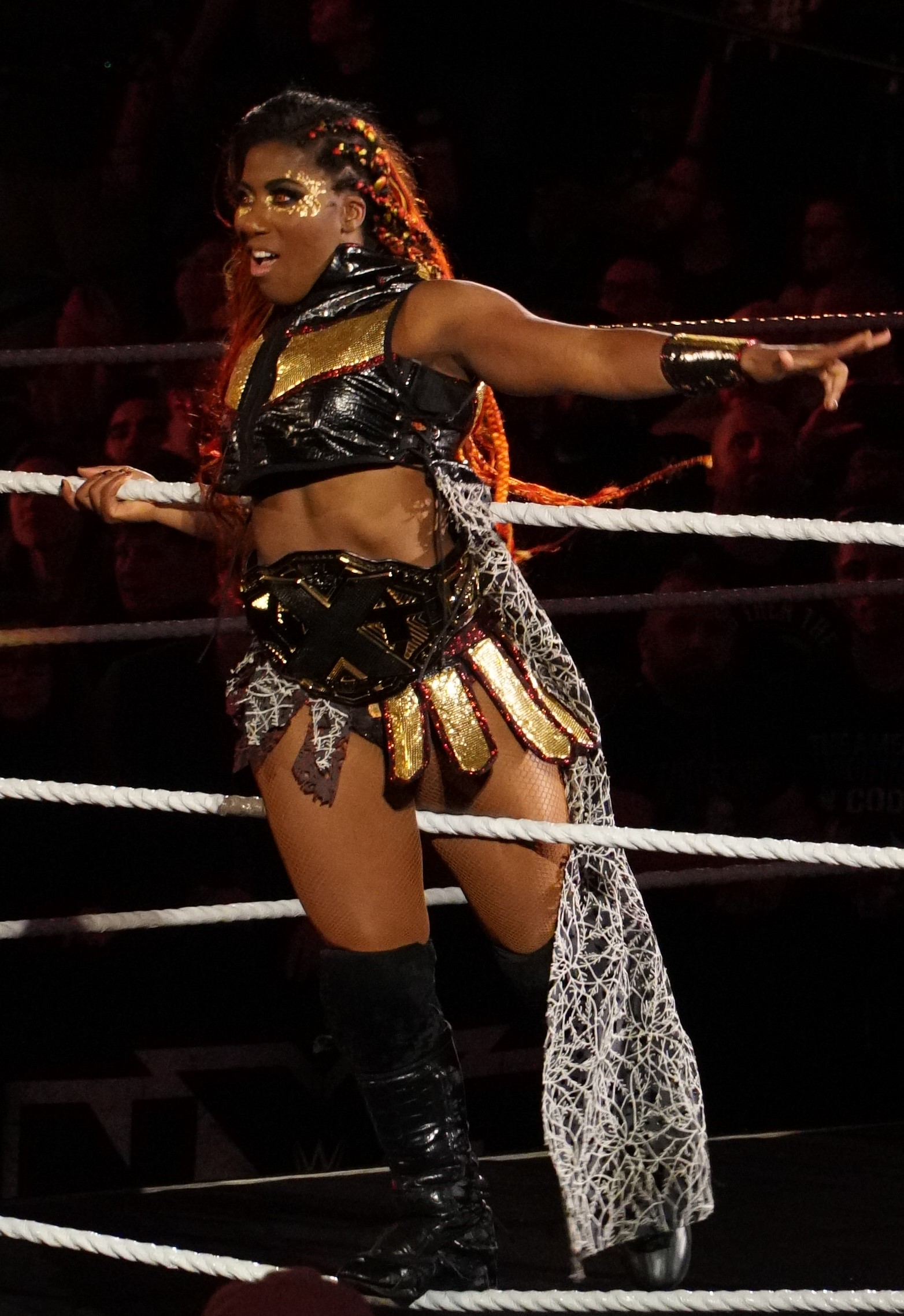
Athena

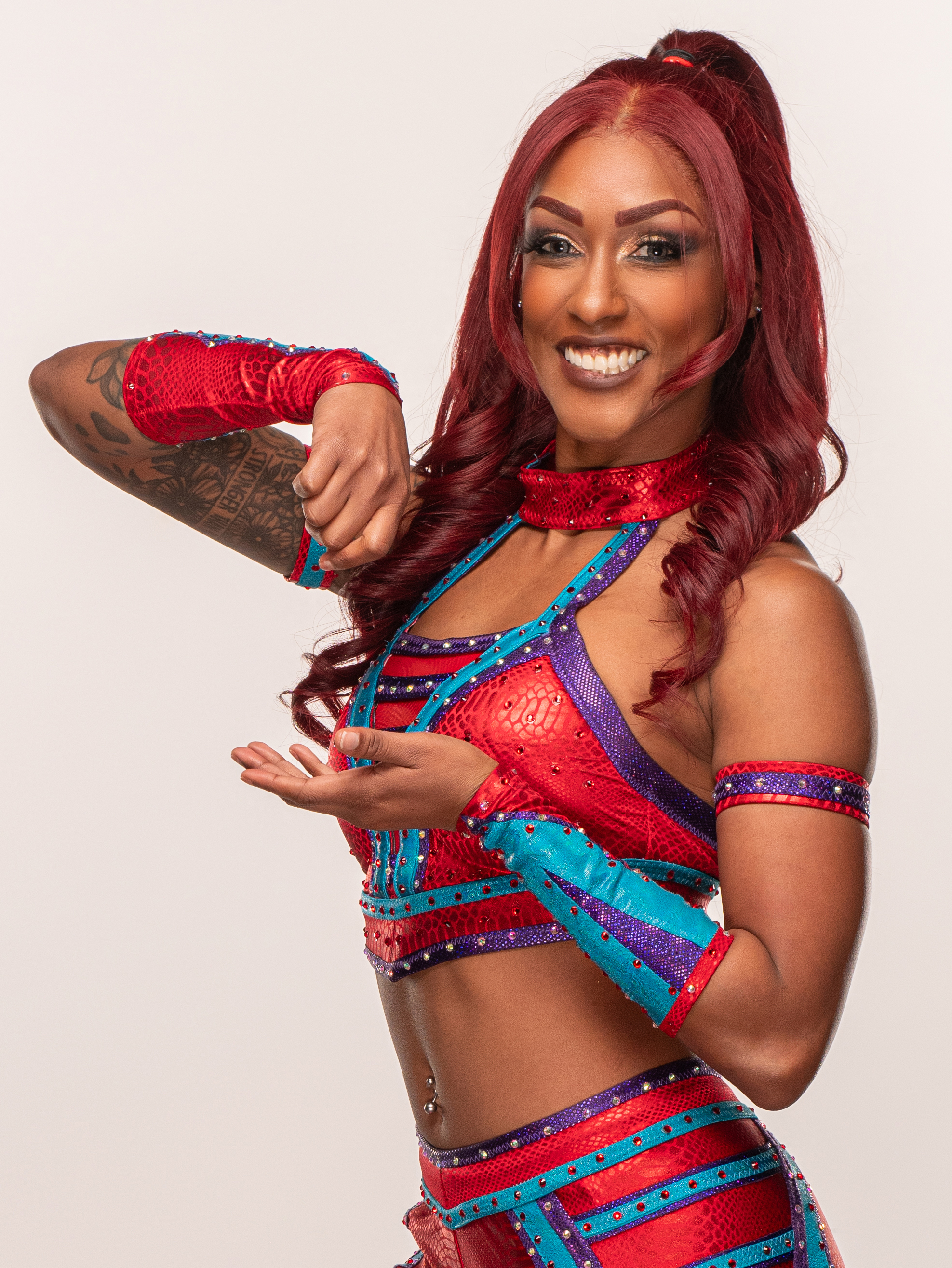
Red Velvet

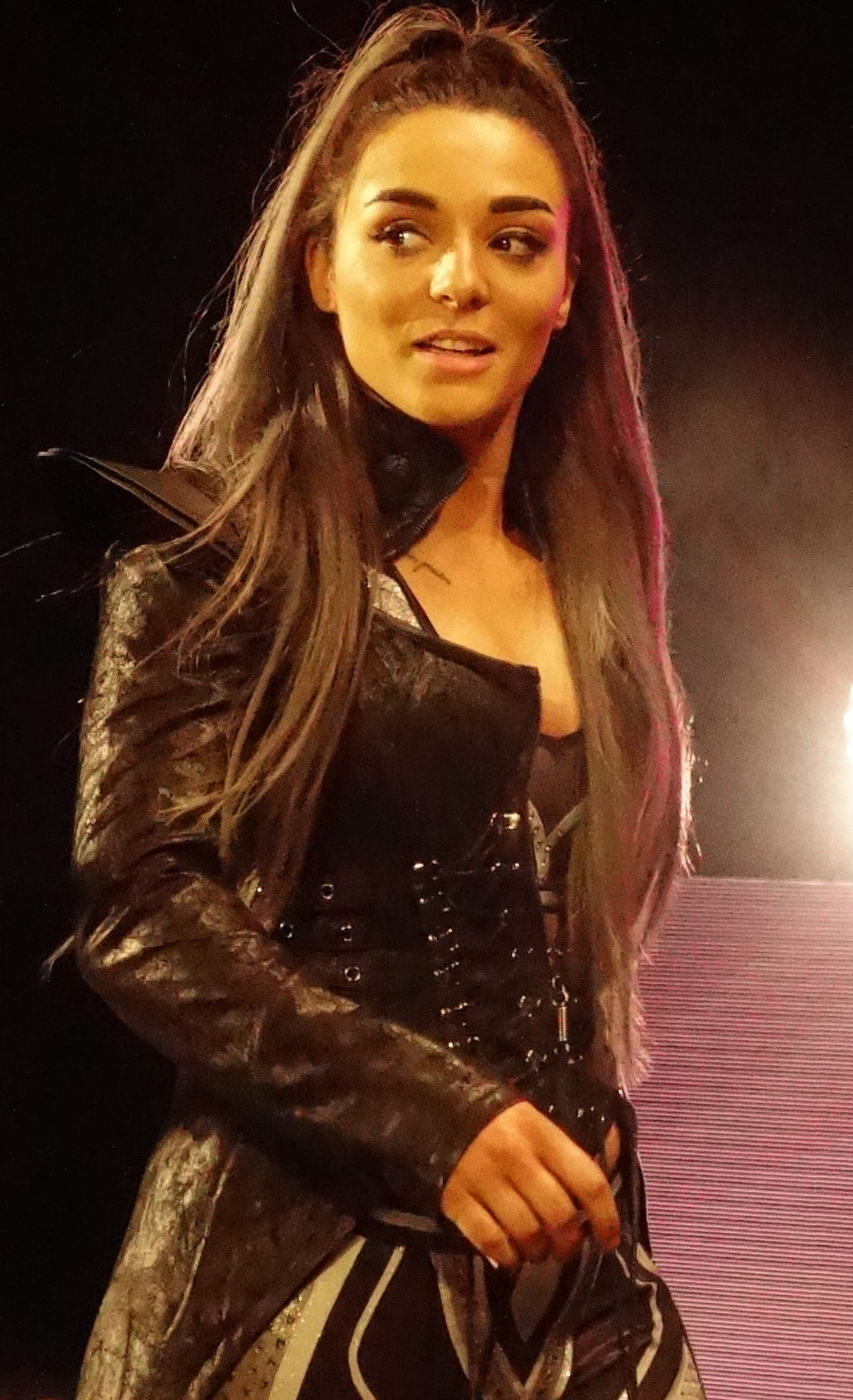
Deonna Purrazzo

Ring name	Real name	Notes
Athena	Adrienne Palmer	ROH Women's World Champion
Billie Starkz	Lillian Bridget	
Cassie Lee	Cassandra Arneill	Member of The IInspiration
Charlette Renegade	Charlette Williamson	
Christyan XO	Christyan Ried	
Deonna Purrazzo	Deonna Purrazzo	Women's Pure Champion
Diamante	Priscilla Zúñiga	
Hyan	Hyaneyoung Gerard	
Jessie McKay	Jessica McKay	Member of The IInspiration
Lacey Lane	Allysa Lane	
Leila Grey	Unknown	
Marina Shafir	Marina Shafir	
Mina Shirakawa	Mina Shirakawa	
Maya World	Ashanti Wilson-Stevenson	
Queen Aminata	Aminata Sylla	
Rachael Ellering	Rachael Ellering	
Red Velvet	Stephanie Cardona	Women's World Television Champion
Robyn Renegade	Robin Williamson	
Serena Deeb	Serena Deeb	Coach
Stori Denali	Mia Grunze	
Taya Valkyrie	Kira Magnin-Forster	
Trish Adora	Patrice McNair	
Zayda Steel	Fatima Zahra	

== Other on-air personnel ==
Ring name	Real name	Notes
Jerry Lynn	Jeremy Lynn	Member of the Board of Directors; Coach
"Smart" Mark Sterling	Mark Rattelle	Manager of The Premier Athletes; Occasional Wrestler
Paul Wight	Paul Wight II	Member of the Board of Directors

== Broadcast team ==
Ring name	Real name	Notes
Arkady Aura	Arkady Unterleidner	Ring announcer
Bobby Cruise	Bobby Cruise	Ring announcer
Caprice Coleman	Caprice Coleman	Color commentator
Ian Riccaboni	Ian Riccaboni	Play-by-play commentator Backup announcer for Collision and Dynamite
Lexy Nair	Alexandra Nair	Backstage interviewer
Melissa Santos	Melissa Santos	Backstage interviewer
Nigel McGuinness	Steven Haworth	Back-up commentator for ROH PPV events Primary commentator for Collision

== Management ==
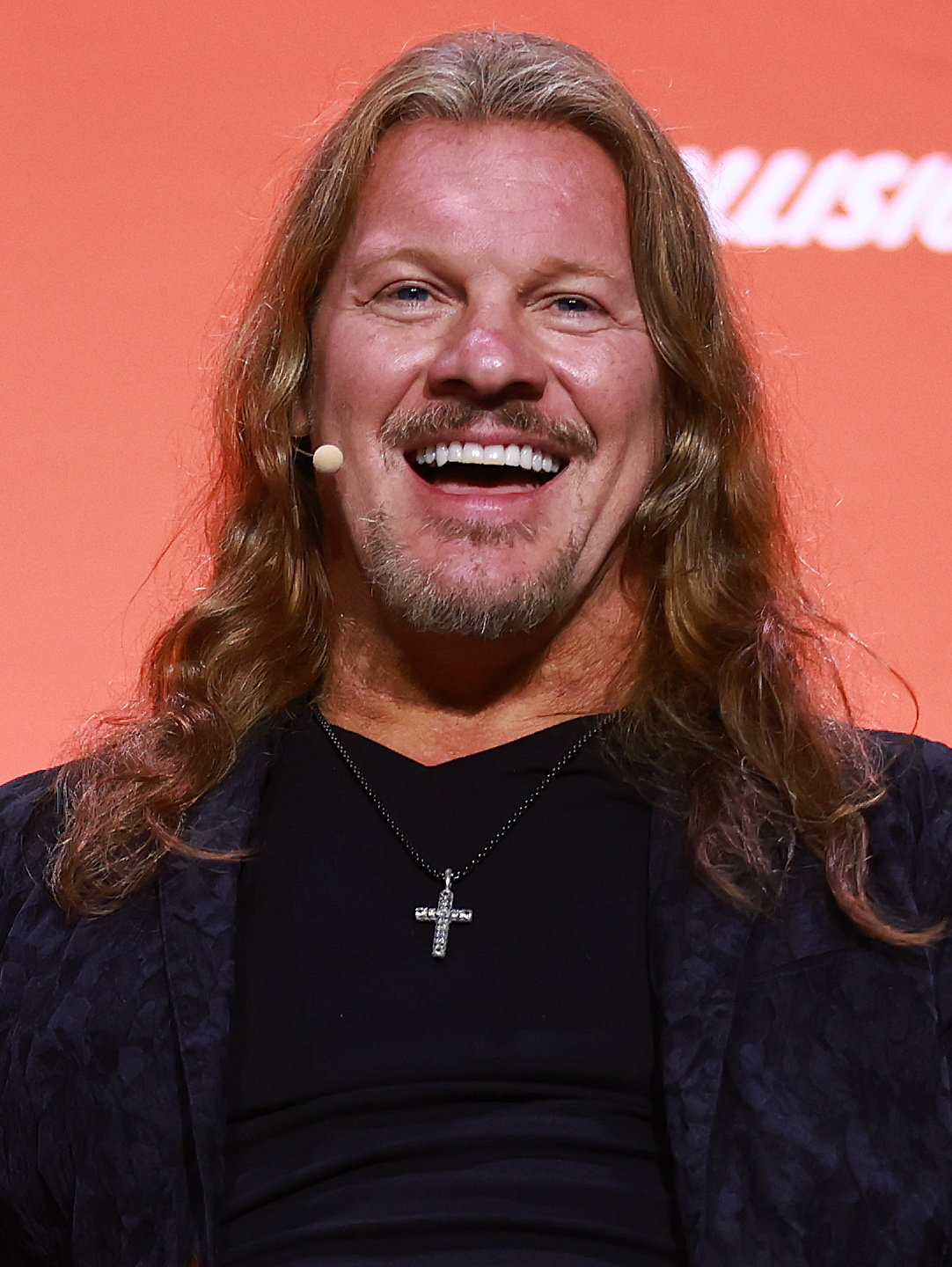
Chris Jericho

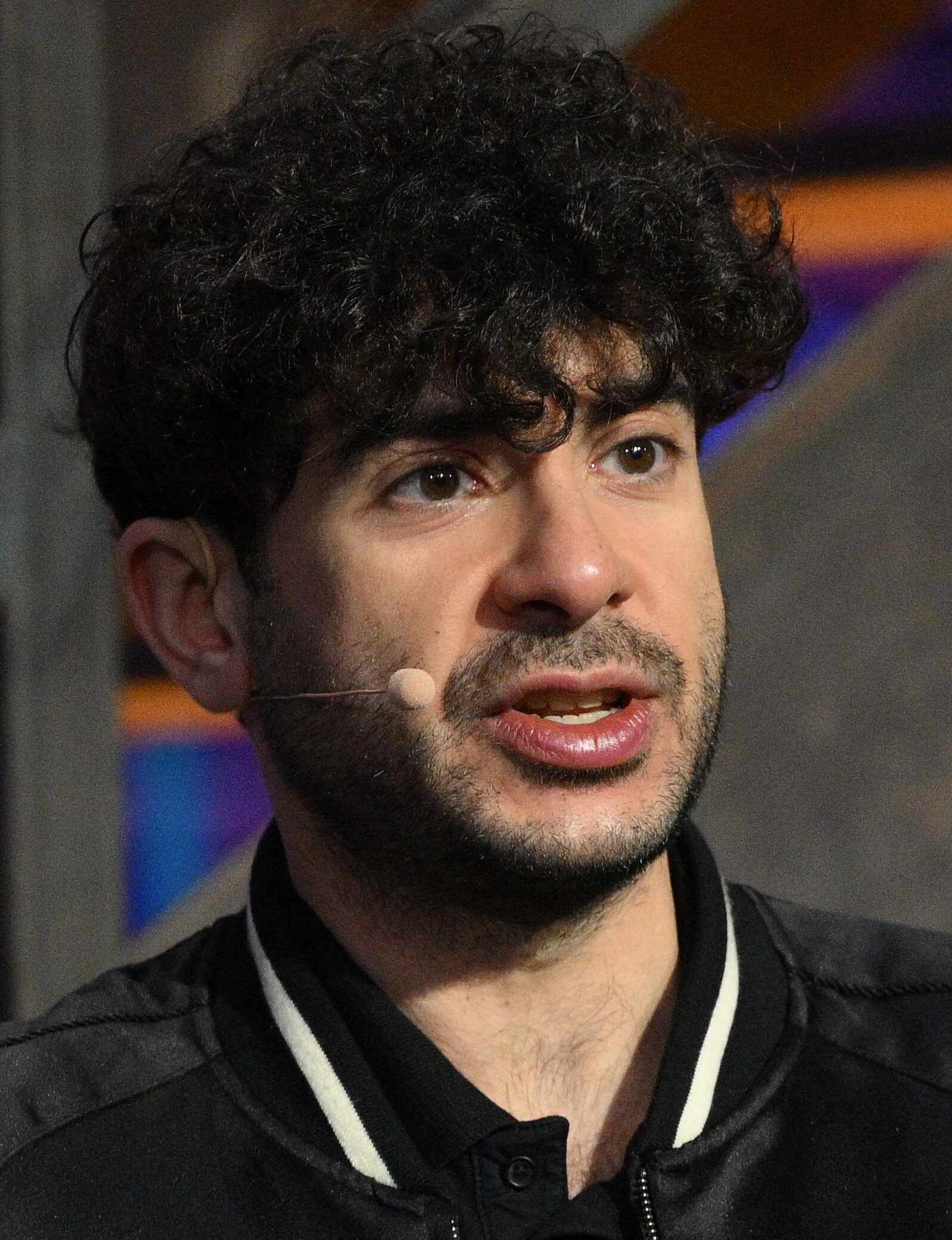
Tony Khan

Ring name	Real name	Notes
Cary Silkin	Cary Silkin	Ambassador; Hall of Famer
Chris Jericho	Christopher Irvine	Creative advisor Coach
Tony Khan	Antony Khan	Owner; Head of Creative

== ROH alumni ==
Former employees in ROH consist of professional wrestlers, managers, play-by-play and color commentators, announcers, interviewers, and referees. The Cross ^{†} indicates that the past talent is deceased.^{‡}

=== Male wrestlers ===
Real name	Ring name(s)	Tenure	Deceased †
Adam Pearce	Adam Pearce	2005–2010	
Jonathan Figueroa	The Amazing Red	2002–2004	
Unknown	Brian XL	2002–2003	
Unknown	Bio-Hazard	2002	
Unknown	Boogaloo	2002	
Brent Albright	Brent Albright	2006–2009	
Schuyler Andrews	Scorpio Sky	2010; 2017–2018	
Shelton Benjamin	Shelton Benjamin	2010–2013	
Michael Bennett	Mike Bennett; Michael Bennett	2008; 2010–2015; 2020-2021; 2023–present	
Rasche Brown	Rasche Brown	2009–2010	
Wagner Brown	Slyck Wagner Brown	2003	
Claudio Castagnoli	Claudio Castagnoli	2005–2011	
Kory Chavis	Kory Chavis; Rainman	2004; 2009–2010	
Chad Collyer	Chad Collyer; The Metal Master	2003–2006; 2010	
Accie Conner	D-Lo Brown	2009	
Daniel Covell	Christopher Daniels	2002–2007; 2010–2011; 2014–2018	
David Crist Jr.	Dave Crist	2006–2008	
Dustin Howard	Chuckie T.	2017–2019	
John Crist	Jake Crist	2006–2008	
Bryan Danielson	Bryan Danielson; American Dragon	2002–2009	
Christopher Dijak	Donovan Dijak	2014–2017	
Douglas Durdle	Doug Williams	2002–2007	
Richard Fliehr	Ric Flair	2009	
Frank Gerdelman	Frankie Kazarian	2014–2018	
Charles Haas	Charlie Haas	2010–2013	
Jeff Hardy	Jeff Hardy; Willow the Wisp	2003; 2017	
Matt Hardy	Matt Hardy	2005; 2012–2014; 2017	
Shawn Hernandez	Hotstuff Hernandez; Hernandez	2003; 2008	
Christopher Irvine	Chris Jericho	2022–2026	
Colby Lopez	Tyler Black	2007–2010	
Matthew Massie	Matt Jackson	2009–2018	
Nicholas Massie	Nick Jackson	2009–2018	
Federico Palacios	Angel Dust; Azrieal	2002–2006	
Cody Rhodes	Cody	2017–2018	
Brandon Silvestry	Low Ki	2002–2006	
Chris Spradlin	Chris Hero	2006–2011	
Kevin Steen	Kevin Steen	2007–2014	
Rami Sebei	El Generico	2005-2012	
Michael Verde	Trent Acid	2002–2004	†
Benjamin Whitmer	B. J. Whitmer	2003–2008; 2012–2018	
Stevie Woltz	Adam Page; Hangman Page	2011-2018	
Stokely Hathaway	Stokely Hathaway	2014–2015	
C. W. Anderson	C. W. Anderson	2002–2003	
Unknown	Buff E	2002–2004	
Matthew Capiccioni	Matt Cross	2006–2009	
Danny Daniels	Danny Daniels	2004, 2007	
Josh Daniels	Josh Daniels	2003–2004	
Jonathan Davis	Jon Davis	2009–2010	
Unknown	Deranged	2002–2005	
Tony DeVito	Tony DeVito	2002–2005	
Chris Divine	Chris Divine	2002–2003	
Brian Brower	Dixie	2002–2005	
Don Juan	Don Juan	2002–2003	
Unknown	Danny Drake	2002	
Kevin Dunn	Dunn	2002–2006	
Jack Miller	Jack Evans	2003–2009	
Jerome Fleisch	Jody Fleisch	2002–2003; 2006	
Mick Foley	Mick Foley	2004–2005	
James Gibson	Jamie Noble	2005	
Jamin Pugh	Jay Briscoe	2002–2023	†
Unknown	Rudy Boy Gonzalez	2002–2003	
Zach Gowen	Zach Gowen	2006; 2008; 2010	
Unknown	Grim Reefer	2003; 2006	
Theodore Annis	Teddy Hart	2003–2004; 2009	
Craig Williams	Human Tornado	2007–2008; 2010	
Adam Brower	Izzy	2002–2003	
Chris Scobille	Jimmy Jacobs	2003–2015	
Ed McGuckin	Jigsaw	2007–2008	
Johnny Kashmere	Johnny Kashmire	2002–2004	
Michael Mayo	Killer Kruel; Mike Kruel	2005	
Jon Huber	Brodie Lee	2008–2009	†
Unknown	Guillotine LeGrande	2003	
Matthew Knowles	H. C. Loc	2002–2005	
Paul London	Paul London	2002–2003	
Jeremy Lynn	Jerry Lynn	2002; 2004; 2008–2010	
Unknown	Mace	2002–2004	
Daniel Lopez	Dan Maff	2002–2005	
Charles Spencer	Tony Mamaluke	2002–2003; 2005–2006	
Kirby Marcos	Marcus	2002–2006	
James Maritato	James Maritato; Guido Maritato	2002; 2009	
Luis Martínez	Punishment Martinez	2015–2018	
Naomichi Marufuji	Naomichi Marufuji	2005–2008	
Brigham Doane	Masada	2002–2004	
Adam Birch	Joey Mercury	2002–2004; 2008	
Kelvin Ramirez	Joel Maximo	2002–2003	
Julio Ramirez	Jose Maximo	2002–2004	
Steve Mack	Monsta Mack	2002–2003	
Takeshi Morishima	Takeshi Morishima	2007–2008	
Andrew Vassos	Donovan Morgan	2002–2003	
Dylan Summers	Necro Butcher	2006–2010	
Tyson Smith	Kenny Omega	2008–2010; 2016	
Marc Dionne	Player Dos	2009–2010	
Nicolas Dansereau	Player Uno	2009–2010	
Daniel Puder	Daniel Puder	2007–2008	
Phillip Brooks	CM Punk	2002–2006	
John Michael Watson	Quiet Storm	2002–2003	
Chasyn Rance	Chasyn Rance	2007–2009	
James Guffey	Jimmy Rave	2003–2007; 2009; 2011; 2013	†
Scott Levy	Raven	2003	
Rick Diaz	Ricky Reyes	2004–2007; 2009–2010	
Terry Gerin	Rhino	2011	
Claude Marrow	Ruckus	2007–2008	
Joseph Meehan	Joey Ryan	2009–2010	
Nuufolau Seanoa	Samoa Joe	2002–2008; 2015	
Unknown	Diablo Santiago	2003–2005	
Michael Shane	Matt Bentley	2002–2003	
Go Shiozaki	Go Shiozaki	2006–2008	
Greg Marasciulo	Beretta	2015–2019	
Shingo Takagi	Shingo	2005–2008	
Unknown	Slim J	2003	
Unknown	Slugger	2002–2003	
Unknown	Julius Smokes	2002–2008	
Christopher Parks	Abyss	2004–2006	
Brian Kendrick	Spanky; Brian Kendrick	2002; 2004–2005; 2010; 2016	
Richard Blood	Ricky Steamboat	2004	
Erick Stevens	Erick Stevens	2007–2010	
Brian Woermann	Matt Stryker	2003–2005	
Alex Whybrow	Larry Sweeney	2006–2009	†
Mike Tobin	Mike Tobin	2002	
John Toland	Tank Toland	2007–2009	
Unknown	Oman Tortuga	2003–2005	
Unknown	Fast Eddie Vegas	2002–2005	
Vordell Walker	Vordell Walker	2005	
John Stagikas	John Walters	2003–2006	
James Watson	Mikey Whipwreck	2002–2003	
John Jirus	Xavier	2002–2004; 2006	†
James Yun	Jimmy Wang	2005–2006	
Jason Spence	Christian York	2002	
Andrew Warner	Scoot Andrews	2002	
Quinn Ojinnaka	Moose	2014–2016	
Kyle Greenwood	Kyle O'Reilly	2009–2017	
Robert Anthony Fish	Bobby Fish	2012–2017	
Christopher Lindsey	Roderick Strong	2003–2016	
Austin Jenkins	Adam Cole	2009–2017	
Cedric Alexander Johnson	Cedric Alexander	2010–2016	
Matthew Joseph Korklan	Matt Sydal	2004–2007; 2014–2017	
Aaron Frobel	Michael Elgin	2007; 2008; 2010–2016	
Albert Christian Hardie Jr.	ACH	2012–2016	
Todd Smith	Hanson	2013–2017	
Raymond Rowe	Rowe	2013–2017	
Scott Colton	Colt Cabana	2002–2007; 2016–2019	
José Alberto Rodríguez	Alberto El Patrón	2014–2015	
Tommaso Whitney	Tommaso Ciampa	2011–2015	
Colby Steven Corino	Colby Corino	2014–2016	
Keith Lee	Keith Lee	2015–2017	
Patrick Kenneth Martin	Alex Shelley	2003–2006; 2007–2008; 2010; 2015–2020	
Joshua Harter	Chris Sabin	2003–2010; 2015–2019	
William Peter Charles Ospreay	Will Ospreay	2016–2018	
Stephen John Tkowski	T. K. O'Ryan	2016–2020	
Lionel Gerard Green	Lio Rush	2015–2017	
Mark LoMonaco	Bully Ray	2017–2020	
Daniel Healy Solwold Jr.	Austin Aries	2004–2007; 2007–2010; 2015; 2018	
Jeffrey Cobb	Jeff Cobb	2018–2020	
Tadarius Thomas	TaDarius Thomas	2011–2015	
Caprice Coleman	Caprice Coleman	2004; 2011–2022	
Tehuti Miles	Elijah King	2018–2019	
Unknown	Andy Dalton	2017–2019	
Unknown	Rayo	2019	
Unknown	Vinny Pacifico	2018–2019	
Unknown	Ryan Nova	2017–2019	
Kenneth Layne	Kenny King	2007–2008 2015–2022	
Yujiro Kushida	Kushida	2013–2019	
Shinsuke Nakamura	Shinsuke Nakamura	2014–2016	
Phillip Paul Lloyd	P. J. Black	2018–2021	
Unknown	Dragon Lee	2016–2021	
Jonathan Gresham	Jonathan Gresham	2011; 2014–2022	
Montel Vontavious Porter	Antonio Banks	2005	
Nelson Erazo	Homicide	2002–2008	
Naofumi Yamamoto	Yoshi Tatsu	2017	
John R. Rivera	Rocky Romero	2004–2005; 2007–2010; 2013–2017	
Alex Sherman	Alex Koslov	2009–2010 2013–2015	
Steven Eugene Corino	Steve Corino	2002–2006 2009–2016	
Unknown	Shaheem Ali	2015–2020	
Eduardo Gory Guerrero Llanes	Eduardo Guerrero	2002–2003	†
Francisco Islas Rueda	Super Crazy	2002–2003	
Unknown	Fred Yehi	2020–2021	
Brent Tate & Brandon Tate	The Tate Twins The Boys	2014–2019 2022–2024	
Brent Tate	Boy #1	2014–2019 2022–2024	
Brandon Tate	Boy #2	2014–2019 2022–2024	
Puma	Theodore James Perkins	2003–2012	
Vinny Marseglia	Vincent Marseglia / Vincent	2012–2022 2023–2025	
William Carr	Dutch	2021–2025	
Unknown	Brian Milonas	2017–2021	

=== Female wrestlers ===
Birth name	Ring name(s)	Tenure	Deceased †
Larissa Vados	Lacey	2004–2008	
Sara Amato	Sara Del Rey	2006–2011	
Tracy Brookshaw	Traci Brooks	2003–2005	
Josette Bynum	Lady JoJo	2010	
Taeler Conrad	Taeler Hendrix	2010; 2014; 2015–2017	
Cathy Corino	Allison Danger	2002–2008	
Jade Chung	Jade Chung	2005	
Stephanie Finochio	Trinity	2003	
Rachel Frobel	MsChif	2006–2013	
April Hunter	April Hunter	2003	
Lindsey Kerecz	Veda Scott	2012–2016	
Mickie Laree James	Alexis Laree	2002–2005	
Allison Plunkett	Allison Wonderland	2007–2008	
Deonna Purrazzo	Deonna Purrazzo	2015–2018	
Adrienne Reese	Athena	2013–2015	
Ana Rocha	Ariel	2003; 2008	
Brandi Rhodes	Brandi Rhodes	2017–2018	
Emily Sharp	Daizee Haze	2004–2011	
Shannon Spruill	Lucy	2003	
Veronica Stevens	Simply Luscious	2002–2003	
Rebecca Treston	Becky Bayless; Rebecca Bayless	2002–2005; 2007–2008	
Tenille Averil Dashwood	Tenille Dashwood	2018–2019	
Callee Wilkerson	Barbi Hayden	2013	
Stephanie Hym Lee	Mia Yim	2011–2013	
Elizabeth Chihaia	Scarlett Bordeaux	2012–2017	
Leah Vaughan	Leah Von Dutch	2013	
Laura Dennis	Cherry Bomb	2013	
Carla Gonzalez	Rok-C	2021–2022	
Jamie Lynn Szantyr	Velvet Sky	2019–2020	
Lauren Williams	Angelina Love	2019–2022	
Amanda Leon	Mandy Leon	2014–2022	
Seleziya Esho	Seleziya Sparx	2013–2015	
Mary Louis Kanellis 'Bennett'	Maria Kanellis	2011–2015 2020–2021	
Unknown	Maria Manic	2019–2020	
Kelly Klein	Kelly Klein	2015–2019	
Mayu Iwatani	Mayu Iwatani	2017–2020	
Unknown	Jenny Rose	2013; 2015–2019	
Unknown	Stella Grey	2017–2020	
Hana Kimura	Hana Kimura	2017–2020	†
Unknown	Jessie Brooks	2017–2020	
Unknown	Faye Jackson	2016–2017	
Unknown	Gabby Ortiz	2017–2020	
Unknown	Stacy Shadows	2017–2020	
Karen Yu	Karen Q	2017–2018	
Camille Ligon	Holidead	2017–2018 2021–2022	
Yukari Ishino	Kagetsu	2017–2020	
Reo Hazuki	HZK	2017–2020	
Ashley Nichole Simmons	Ashley Lane / Madison Rayne	2008–2011 2017–2019	
Kelly Verbil	Quinn McKay	2019–2021	
Martibel Payano	Marti Belle	2021	
Unknown	Nicole Savoy	2019–2021	
Allysin Kay	Allysin Kay	2012; 2021	
Alex Gracia	Alex Gracia	2021	
Unknown	Mazzerati	2019; 2021	
Unknown	Miranda Alize	2021–2022	
Unknown	Vita VonStarr	2020–2021	
Sakai Sumie	Sumie Sakai	2002–2004 2018–2020 2021–2022	
Solo Darling	Solo Darling	2016	
Sarah Bridges	Mary Dobson	2011; 2016	
Karen Glennon	Session Moth Martina	2019–2022	
Unknown	Gia Scott	2021	
Kellyanne Salter	Kellyanne	2021	
Katie Forbes	Katie Forbes	2019	
Kimberly Benson	Viper	2018	
Kayleigh Rae	Kay Lee Ray	2018	
Unknown	Chardonnay	2018	
Kristen Stadtlander	Kris Stadtlander	2018	
Unknown	Harissa Rivera	2019	
Kris Hernandez	Kris Wolf	2017	
Tamara McNeill	Hania The Howling Huntress	2015–2017	
Kate Carney	Kate Carney	2019	
Kyoko Kimura / Kimura Kyōko	Kyoko Kimura	2016	
Chelsea Anne Green	Chelsea Green	2021	
Unknown	Laynie Luck	2022	
Unknown	Janai Kai	2022	
Tasha Steelz	Tasha Steelz	2017; 2018–2020	
Brandi Lauren Pawalek	Brandi Lauren	2017	
Rachel Kelvington	Ray Lynn	2016	
Brittany Baker	Britt Baker	2016	
Unknown	Rockelle Vaughn	2019	
Kimberly Dawn Davis	'Bullet Bade' Amber Gallows / Amber O'Neal	2016	
Francine Fournier 'Meeks'	Francine	2004	
Shannon Claire Spruill	Daffney	2018; 2021	†
Bonnie Maxson	Rain	2017–2018	
Jessica Nora Kresa	ODB	2015–2016	
Lisa Marie Varon	Tara	2013	
Dori Elizabeth Prange	Heidi Lovelace	2015	
Ashley Medrano	Ashley Vox	2018; 2021	
Elizabeth Medrano	Delmi Exo	2021	
Rachael Ellering	Rachael Ellering	2016	
Jessika Heiser	Kennadi Brink	2016	
Unknown	Jynx	2018	

=== Special guests ===
Ring name(s)	Birth name	Tenure
Abdullah the Butcher	Larry Shreve	2002
Atsushi Aoki	Atsushi Aoki	2007
Arashi	Isao Takagi	2003
Baron Von Raschke	James Raschke	2004
Black Tiger	John Rivera	2005
Blue Demon, Jr.	Unknown	2009–2010
Robbie Brookside	Robert Brooks	2006
Bushwhacker Luke	Brian Wickens	2007–2009
BxB Hulk	Terumasa Ishihara	2008
Christian Cage	William Reso	2006
Cassandro el Exotico	Saúl Armendáriz	2010
CIMA	Nobuhiko Oshima	2005–2008
Dennis Condrey	Dennis Condrey	2004
J. J. Dillon	J. J. Dillon	2006
Naruki Doi	Naruki Doi	2006–2008
Shane Douglas	Troy Martin	2005
Dragon Kid	Nobuyoshi Nakamura	2006–2008
Tommy Dreamer	Thomas Laughlin	2002–2003
Bobby Eaton	Robert Eaton	2004
Terry Funk	Terrence Funk	2003
The Great Muta	Keiji Mutoh	2003
Eddie Guerrero	Eduardo Guerrero	2002
Bret Hart	Bret Hart	2009
Kaz Hayashi	Kazuhiro Hayashi	2003
Bobby Heenan	Raymond Heenan	2004–2005
Joe Higuchi	Joe Higuchi	2007
Honky Tonk Man	Wayne Farris	2008
Tomaoki Honma	Tomaoki Honma	2003
Genki Horiguchi	Genki Horiguchi	2006–2008
Kota Ibushi	Kota Ibushi	2008
Incognito	Jorge Arriaga	2009
Kikutaro / Ebessan / Ebetaro	Mitsunobu Kikuzawa	2005–2006
Kenta Kobashi	Kenta Kobashi	2005
Satoshi Kojima	Satoshi Kojima	2003
Konnan	Charles Ashenoff	2002–2003; 2006
Alex Koslov	Alex Koslov	2009–2010
Stan Lane	Wallace Lane	2004
Jushin Thunder Liger	Keiichi Yamada	2004; 2010
Magno	Oscar Vasquez	2009; 2010
Ricky Marvin	Ricardo Fuentes Romero	2007
Mitsuharu Misawa	Mitsuharu Misawa	2007
Misterioso	Roberto Castillo	2010
Masaaki Mochizuki	Masaaki Mochizuki	2006–2008
Katsuhiko Nakajima	Katsuhiko Nakajima	2008
Takao Omori	Takao Omori	2002
Shinjiro Otani	Shinjiro Otani	2002
PAC	Ben Satterley	2007
Percy Pringle	William Moody	2005
Mike Quackenbush	Michael Spillane	2007–2009
Harley Race	Harley Race	2007
Dusty Rhodes	Virgil Runnels, Jr.	2004
Ryo Saito	Ryo Saito	2006–2008
Bruno Sammartino	Bruno Sammartino	2006–2007
Kensuke Sasaki	Kensuke Sasaki	2008
Scotty 2 Hotty	Scott Garland	2010
Ken Shamrock	Ken Shamrock	2002
JT Smith	John T. Smith	2002
Lance Storm	Lance Evers	2005–2006; 2008–2009
Super Crazy	Francisco Pantoja Islas	2002
Super Parka	Ramón Banda	2010
SUWA	Takahiro Suwa	2006
Kotaro Suzuki	Kotaro Suzuki	2007–2008
Tammy Sytch	Tammy Sytch	2007–2008, 2010
Masato Tanaka	Masato Tanaka	2002
Les Thatcher	Leslie Malady	2004
Bill Watts	Bill Watts	2005
YAMATO	Masato Onodera	2007–2008
Susumu Yokosuka	Susumu Mochizuki	2007
Masato Yoshino	Masato Yoshino	2006–2008
Larry Zbyszko	Lawrence Whistler	2010
Jessica Nora Kresa	ODB	2015
Lisa Marie Varon	Tara	2013

=== Former students ===
Ring name(s)	Real name	Tenure(s)
Davey Andrews	Davey Andrews	2004–2005
Antonio Blanca	Antonio Blanca	
Derrick Dempsey	Derrick Dempsey	2005–2006
Anthony Franco	Anthony Franco	2004–2005
Pelle Primeau	Pelle Primeau	2006–2008
Evan Starsmore	Evan Starsmore	
Matt Turner	Andrew Rugh	2004–2005

=== Shimmer Women Athletes (2005–2011) ===
Ring name(s)	Real name	Tenure(s)
Amazing Kong	Kia Stevens	2007; 2010
Eden Black	Sarah Ardley	2007
Jennifer Blake	Jennifer Blake	2008
Cheerleader Melissa	Melissa Anderson	2006
Jamilia Craft	Unknown	2010
Serena Deeb	Serena Deeb	2007–2008
Madison Eagles	Alexandra Ryan	2008
Jetta	Vicky Hughes	2007
Ayumi Kurihara	Ayumi Kurihara	2011
Ashley Lane	Ashley Simmons	2008
Hiroyo Matsumoto	Hiroyo Matsumoto	2011
Nicole Matthews	Nicole Matthews	2009
Jessie McKay	Jessie McKay	2008
Tomoka Nakagawa	Tomoka Nakagawa	2011
Nevaeh	Beth Vocke	2009
Portia Perez	Jenna Grattan	2007
Rain	Bonnie Maxon	2006–2008
Tiana Ringer	Tiana Ringer	2006
Cindy Rogers	Cindy Rogers	2005
Nikki Roxx	Nicole Raczynski	2006–2007; 2009
Sassy Stephie	Stephanie Sager	2008–2009
Rachel Summerlyn	Rachel Summerlyn	2010
Shantelle Taylor	Shantelle Malawski	2006
Alexa Thatcher	Alexa Thatcher	2007–2008

=== Commentators and interviewers ===
Ring name(s)	Real name	Role	Tenure(s)
Rebecca Bayless	Rebecca Treston	Backstage and In-Ring Interviewer	2007–2008
Jimmy Bower / Chris Lovey	Gabe Sapolsky	Booker, play-by-play commentator	2002–2008
Gary Michael Cappetta	Gary Michael Cappetta	Backstage interviewer	2002–2006
Stephen DeAngelis	Stephen DeAngelis	Ring announcer	2002–2003
Donnie B	Don Bucci	Play-by-play commentator	2002
Jared David	Jared David St. Laurent	Play-by-play commentator	2006
Eric Gargiulo	Eric Gargiulo	Play-by-play commentator	2002
Jeff Gorman	Jeff Gorman	Play-by-play commentator, ring announcer	2002–2004
Mike Hogewood†	Michael Hogewood	Play-by-play commentator	2009–2011
Lenny Leonard	Lenny Thomas	Color commentator	2005–2009
Ray Murrow	Doug Gentry	Owner, Cameraman, Color commentator	2002–2004
Chris Nelson	Christopher Tipton	Color commentator	2003–2004
Mark Nulty	Mark Nulty	Play-by-play commentator	2002–2005
Dave Prazak	Dave Prazak	Play-by-play commentator	2005–2011
Sugar Sean Price	Sean Price	Backstage interviewer	2004–2005
Kevin Kelly	Kevin Foote	Play-by-play commentator	2010–2017
Steve Corino	Steven Eugene Corino	Color commentator	2013–2016

=== New Japan Pro-Wrestling (2014–2019) ===
Real name	Ring name(s)	Tenure
Keiichi Yamada	Jushin Liger	2014; 2019
Unknown	Kazuchika Okada	2014
Alipate Aloisio Leone	Tama Tonga	2019
Tevita Tu'amoeloa Fetaiakimoeata Fifita	Tanga Loa	2019
Unknown	Yuji Nagata	2019
Satoshi Kojima	Satoshi Kojima	2019
Takaaki Watanabe	Evil	2019
Seiya Sanada	Sanada	2016; 2019
Hirooki Goto	Hirooki Goto	2019
Shinsuke Nakamura	Shinsuke Nakamura	2014–2016
Yujiro Kushida	Kushida	2013–2019
Naofumi Yamamoto	Yoshi Tatsu	2017
John R. Rivera	Rocky Romero	2013–2017
Alex Sherman	Alex Koslov	2013–2015

=== World Wonder Ring Stardom (2016; 2017–2020, 2025) ===
Birth name	Ring name(s)	Tenure
Kyoko Kimura	Kyoko Kimura	2016
Reo Hazuki	HZK	2017
Mayu Iwatani	Mayu Iwatani	2017–2020
Yukari Ishino	Kagetsu	2017–2020
Hana Kimura^{†}	Hana Kimura	2017–2020
Kris Hernandez	Kris Wolf	2017

== See also ==
- List of All Elite Wrestling personnel
- List of Ring of Honor alumni
- List of professional wrestlers
