= Rob Feinstein =

American former professional wrestler

Personal information
- Born: Robert Feinstein; October 1, 1972 (age 54) Langhorne, Pennsylvania, U.S.

Professional wrestling career
- Ring name(s): Rob Feinstein; 7-11; Fun Athletic Guy
- Billed height: 6 ft 0 in (1.83 m)
- Debut: July 17, 1995
- Retired: 2004

Rob Feinstein (born October 1, 1972) is an American former professional wrestler, promoter, and founder of Ring Of Honor. He is also known for pioneering the production and sale of shoot interview tapes, where wrestlers speak candidly out of character about their career.

== Professional wrestling career ==
Feinstein made his professional wrestling debut in 1995 for Extreme Championship Wrestling for their pay-per-view Heatwave '95: Rage in the Cage! when he intervened after a match between Paul Heyman and Bill Alfonso. 911 came and chokeslammed Feinstein.

In 1997, he was 7-11 (parodying Syxx) a member of the Blue World Order.

Feinstein had owned and operated RF Video (a professional wrestling videotape & DVD distribution company), which was best known as the videographer for Extreme Championship Wrestling (ECW). Immediately following the closing of ECW in 2001, Feinstein founded the Ring of Honor (ROH) wrestling promotion in 2002.

ROH's first show was on February 23, 2002, the first event, titled The Era of Honor Begins, took place at old ECW arena in Philadelphia. It featured nine matches, including a match between Eddy Guerrero and Super Crazy for the IWA Intercontinental Heavyweight Championship and a triple threat match between Christopher Daniels, Bryan Danielson, and Low Ki (who would become known as the "founding fathers of ROH"). In its first year of operation, Ring of Honor confined itself to staging live events in a limited number of venues and cities – primarily in the northeastern United States. Ten shows ran in Philadelphia, two in Wakefield, Massachusetts; one in metro Pittsburgh, Pennsylvania; and, one in Queens, New York.

== 2004 Perverted-Justice controversy ==
In early 2004, Feinstein, who owned Ring of Honor at the time, drove to a Philadelphia home to meet a boy who he believed to be 14-years-old after having a sexually explicit online chat. Feinstein chatted with a Perverted-Justice decoy via AIM, an instant messaging platform powered by AOL, and after having a sexual conversation, made plans to meet at the boy's house while he was home alone. When Feinstein arrived to the residence, he was greeted by WCAU NBC 10 news cameras and a news anchor, to which Feinstein responded by running to his vehicle and speeding away from the scene. Soon after, he resigned from both Ring of Honor and RF Video. Feinstein would later take back control of RF Video, but has never been involved with ROH since. Feinstein was not criminally charged.

In the aftermath of the scandal, Total Nonstop Action Wrestling (TNA) ended its talent-sharing agreement with Ring of Honor, abruptly withdrawing all of its contracted wrestlers from their prior commitments to perform in ROH shows—including major ROH draws A.J. Styles and Christopher Daniels, who held and were about to hold ROH championships, respectively. Doug Gentry eventually bought Feinstein's stake in ROH, and later sold it to Cary Silkin.
