= ROH Hall of Fame =

Professional wrestling hall of fame

- Established: January 26, 2022 (4 years ago)
- Founder: Ring of Honor (ROH)
- Inductees: 3 individuals 1 group (2 members); 1 Legacy Award recipient (6 total inductees)

The Ring of Honor (ROH) Hall of Fame is a professional wrestling hall of fame that honors professional wrestlers and wrestling personalities who contributed to the history of the U.S. based wrestling promotion Ring of Honor (ROH).

== History ==
ROH established its hall of fame on January 26, 2022, as part of the celebration of the promotion's 20th anniversary. They announced that four inductees will make up the inaugural class. The ceremony was presented March 5, 2022, on ROH TV.

The future of the ROH Hall of Fame is unclear, as Ring of Honor was purchased by All Elite Wrestling founder and CEO Tony Khan, with the sale being officially completed on May 4, 2022. Though an altered Ring of Honor brand would continue under the AEW umbrella, there has been no mention by AEW on the future of the ROH Hall of Fame.

== Inductees ==
=== Individuals ===
Year	Ring name (Birth name)	Ring of Honor recognized accolades
2022	Bryan Danielson	One-time ROH World Champion; One-time ROH Pure Champion; Survival of the Fittest winner (2004)
2022	Samoa Joe (Nuufolau Seanoa)	One-time and longest reigning ROH World Champion (645 days); One-time ROH Pure Champion; In April 2022, he also won the ROH World Television Championship
2022	CM Punk (Phillip Brooks)	One-time ROH World Champion; Two-time ROH Tag Team Champion

=== Group inductions ===
Year	Group	Ring of Honor recognized accolades
2022	The Briscoes	12-time ROH World Tag Team Champions; One-time IWGP Tag Team Champions; One-time ROH World Six-Man Tag Team Champions; Honor Rumble winners (2009); In 2022, they won the ROH World Tag Team Championship once.
2022	Jay Briscoe (Jamin Pugh) – Two-time ROH World Champion; Mark Briscoe (Mark Pugh) – Honor Rumble winner (2013). In 2024 he also won the ROH World Championship	

=== Legacy Award ===
Year	Ring name (Birth name)	Ring of Honor recognized accolades
2022	Cary Silkin	Owner of ROH from 2004 to 2011; Served as an ambassador for the promotion from 2011 to 2022
