= EMLL 40th Anniversary Show =

Mexican Professional wrestling show

- Promotion: Empresa Mexicana de Lucha Libre
- Date: September 21, 1973
- City: Mexico City, Mexico
- Venue: Arena México
- Attendance: 13,000

Event chronology
← Previous; EMLL 39th Anniversary Show (2)	Next →: 18. Aniversario de Arena México

EMLL Anniversary Show chronology
← Previous; 39th Anniversary (2)	Next → 41st Anniversary

The EMLL 40th Anniversary Show (Spanish: 40. Aniversario de EMLL) was a professional wrestling major show event produced by Empresa Mexicana de Lucha Libre (EMLL) that took place on September 21, 1973, in Arena México, Mexico City, Mexico. The event commemorated the 40th anniversary of EMLL, which would become the oldest professional wrestling promotion in the world. The Anniversary show is EMLL's biggest show of the year, their Super Bowl event. The EMLL Anniversary Show series is the longest-running annual professional wrestling show, starting in 1934.

== Production ==
=== Background ===
The 1973 Anniversary show commemorated the 40th anniversary of the Mexican professional wrestling company Empresa Mexicana de Lucha Libre (Spanish for "Mexican Wrestling Promotion"; EMLL) holding their first show on September 22, 1933, by promoter and founder Salvador Lutteroth. EMLL was rebranded early in 1992 to become Consejo Mundial de Lucha Libre ("World Wrestling Council"; CMLL) signal their departure from the National Wrestling Alliance. With the sales of the Jim Crockett Promotions to Ted Turner in 1988 EMLL became the oldest, still-operating wrestling promotion in the world. Over the years EMLL/CMLL has on occasion held multiple shows to celebrate their anniversary but since 1977 the company has only held one annual show, which is considered the biggest show of the year, CMLL's equivalent of WWE's WrestleMania or their Super Bowl event. CMLL has held their Anniversary show at Arena México in Mexico City, Mexico since 1956, the year the building was completed, over time Arena México earned the nickname "The Cathedral of Lucha Libre" due to it hosting most of EMLL/CMLL's major events since the building was completed. Traditionally EMLL/CMLL holds their major events on Friday Nights, replacing their regularly scheduled Super Viernes show.

=== Storylines ===
The event featured an undetermined number of professional wrestling matches with different wrestlers involved in pre-existing scripted feuds, plots and storylines. Wrestlers were portrayed as either heels (referred to as rudos in Mexico, those that portray the "bad guys") or faces (técnicos in Mexico, the "good guy" characters) as they followed a series of tension-building events, which culminated in a wrestling match or series of matches. Due to the nature of keeping mainly paper records of wrestling at the time no documentation has been found for some of the matches of the show.

== Event ==
The 40th EMLL anniversary show featured an unknown number of matches, traditionally EMLL has five to six matches per show, but at times have had more or less and the total number has not been verified. In one of the few confirmed matches NWA World Middleweight Champion Rene Guajardo successfully defended the title against El Halcón in a best two-out-of three falls match. The main event was a double Lucha de Apuesta hair vs. hair match with both members of each tag team putting their hair on the line against the outcome of the match. The storyline brothers of Ray and Ringo Mendoza took on and defeated the team of Ángel Blanco and Kim Chul Won to have both of them shaved bald.

== Results ==
No.	Results	Stipulations
1	Rene Guajardo (c) vs. El Halcón ended in a draw	Best two-out-of-three-falls match for the NWA World Middleweight Championship
2	Ray and Ringo Mendoza defeated Ángel Blanco and Kim Chul Won	Best two-out-of-three-falls Lucha de Apuesta hair vs. hair match
(c) / – the champion(s) heading into the match
