= Christopher Street Connection =

Professional wrestling tag team

Tag team
- Members: Buff E Mace Mendoza; Fun Athletic Guy (manager); Jailbait (valet); Allison Danger (valet); Ariel (valet)
- Billed heights: Buff E: 6 ft 0 in (1.83 m); Mace: 5 ft 8 in (1.73 m)
- Combined billed weight: 420 pounds (190 kg); Buff E: 220 pounds (100 kg); Mace: 200 pounds (91 kg)
- Hometown: Greenwich Village, New York City
- Billed from: "The Village in NYC"
- Debut: 2000
- Trained by: Homicide; Laithon

The Christopher Street Connection were a professional wrestling tag team consisting of Buff E and Mace Mendoza. They primarily compete in Northeastern and Mid-Atlantic independent promotions, most notably, World-1 South, Jersey All Pro Wrestling, Ring of Honor and Frank Goodman's United States Xtreme Wrestling. Frequent opponents of such tag teams as Da Hit Squad, The Carnage Crew and The Heartbreak Express, they fought both The Heartbreak Express and The Extreme Horsemen (Steve Corino and Ricky Landell) over the WSL World Tag Team Championship in early 2007.

For nearly a decade, the Christopher Street Connection competed as the only "openly gay" tag team on the independent circuit during the early to mid-2000s and gained notoriety. Similar to the ring styles of World Championship Wrestling's West Hollywood Blondes (Lenny and Lodi) and the World Wrestling Federation's Billy and Chuck, their in-ring personas included suggestive behavior, flirting with their opponents and, on occasion, male members in the audience. The team was originally managed by Rob Feinstein, under the name Fun Athletic Guy. They also had a series of female valets including Allison Danger, Ariel and Jailbait.

== Career ==
=== Jersey All Pro Wrestling (2000-2001) ===
Both trained by Homicide and Laithon, Buff E and Mace Mendoza both made their singles debuts during the late-1990s prior to their debut as the Christopher Street Connection. Their name was a reference to the real-life Christopher Street in Manhattan, New York where the Stonewall Riots occurred in 1969. They were introduced with their manager Fun Athletic Guy and later joined by Chris Cabana as well as valets Allison Danger, Ariel and Jailbait. They also competed for the Long Island Wrestling Federation during their early careers.

In early-2000, they began wrestling for Jersey All Pro Wrestling facing The Sickness (Twiggy Ramirez and Adorable Anthony) and NC-17 (Lil Joka and Angel Martinez) at house shows in Bayonne and Sayreville, New Jersey before losing to Da Hit Squad (Mafia and Monsta Mack) at Halloween Hell at Schuetzen Park Ballroom in North Bergen, New Jersey. On November 17, they defeated PapaDon and Terra X at Battle In Bayonne and NC-17 at South Philly Invasion: 3rd Anniversary Show at the ECW Arena the following night. They lost to The Backseat Boyz at Seasons Beatings on December 8, 2000.

On February 2, 2001, the Christopher Street Connection lost to Da Hit Squad in a match for the JAPW Tag Team Championship. The next night at The New Beginning, they lost to Skinhead Ivan and Judas Young at the ECW Arena. They also lost to The Moondogs 2000 (Moondog Wenzel and Jak Molsonn) at the first night of March Madness on March 23 and JAPW Tag Team Champions Da Hit Squad at Proven on April 21. At The Upset on May 18, the team lost to Low Ki in a handicap match. Returning to the ECW Arena, they lost to The Moondogs 2000 at The Meltdown the next day. The team hosted an interview segment, Out of the Closet, at Royal Consequences two months later.

On November 9, they faced their former trainer Liathon in a handicap match. Chris Cabana was also joined in the match but ended up being pinned by Laithon after a Northern Lights suplex. They lost two more handicap matches to Laithon at Halloween Hell and November Pain. At the 2-day Seasons Beatings supercard, they lost to Da Hit Squad but defeated the Rednecks From Hell (Big Jay and Matt Lariat) the second night.

=== Ring of Honor (2002-2003) ===
On February 22, 2002, the Christopher Street Connection made their Ring of Honor debut at the promotion's first show in Philadelphia, Pennsylvania. They appeared in the opening match against Da Hit Squad and, after Mendoza was pinned by Mafia, Da Hit Squad attacked Allison Danger by putting her though a table. They made their second appearance in ROH at A Night of Appreciation losing to Da Hit Squad once again in a three-way match with Prince Nana and female wrestler Simply Luscious.

The two would continue to appear in JAPW at various times throughout the year. On May 3, the Christopher Street Connection lost to the Shaolin Wrecking Crew (Suba and Magic) when Magic pinned Chris Cabana despite not being officially in the match. Cabana, who was at ringside, had attempted to interfere in the match but was pinned costing them the match. On July 13, they defeated Eddie Thomas and Tony Lazaro in Seaside Heights, New Jersey. As well as being one of Alison Danger's earliest appearances with the group, it was the return match for Eddie Thomas since being injured in a car accident earlier that year.

Later that year in ROH, they would also face the Badstreet Boys (Joey Matthews and Christian York), The Carnage Crew (Loc and Devito) and Da Hit Squad. On December 28 at Final Battle '02, Mendoza and Eddie Guapo teamed as the New Christopher Street Connection. Facing The Carnage Crew at the Murphy Rec Center in Philadelphia, they were awarded the match via disqualification when their opponents attacked them with hubcaps.

During most of 2003, they would feud with The Carnage Crew in Ring of Honor. At ROH's First Anniversary Show at the Elks Lodge in Queens, New York, the Christopher Street Connection interfered in a match between The Carnage Crew and Texas Wrestling Academy students Hotstuff Hernandez, Don Juan and Fast Eddie. Rudy Boy Gonzalez, the school's head instructor, was at ringside. On March 22, Mace Mendoza teamed with Hotstuff Hernandez at Night of Champions losing to The Carnage Crew in Philadelphia when Mendoza was pinned by a second rope spike piledriver. On June 14, the Christopher Street Connection lost to The Carnage Crew at Night of Grudges in a grudge match. Following the match, Loc and Devito attacked their valet Ariel with a top rope spike piledriver.

=== USA Pro Wrestling and the independents (2004-2006) ===
On February 8, 2004, the Christopher Street Connection appeared at an interpromotional card between Pro Wrestling WORLD-1 and Wrestling Spotlight to raise money for the Christopher James "We Can Beat It" Cancer Fund. Held at the Cultural Center in Fall River, Massachusetts, they and Jason The Legend wrestled The Solution and Guillotine LeGrande in a 6-man tag team match.

On April 8, the Christopher Street Connection faced Josh Daniels and Matt Striker in a match to decide the first Pro Wrestling WORLD-1 Tag Team Champions in Pottstown, Pennsylvania. The two teams fought to a double-countout however, and the titles remained vacant. The next night, the Christopher Street Connection faced Simon Diamond and Justin Credible at a show for Pro Wrestling WORLD-1 at the Solanco Fairgrounds in Quarryville, Pennsylvania. This was the first ICW event held in three years. On May 22, a match involving themselves, Special K (Izzy and Dixie) and The Ring Crew Express ended in a no-contest when Generation Next (Alex Shelley, Austin Aries, Jack Evans and Roderick Strong) broke up the match attacking all three teams.

While in USA Pro Wrestling the next year, they defeated Simon Diamond and Matt Striker to win the promotion's tag team titles on June 19, 2004. They also made a brief return to Ring of Honor at Do or Die III where they lost to Colt Cabana in a handicap match on July 17. Defending their titles against Matt Striker and M-Tizzle on September 17, they later appeared on a USA Pro show two months later in a same-sex wedding. The wedding was interrupted however when Matt Striker, serving as Buff E's best man, objected during the ceremony with Buff E admitting an affair between the two of them. Mendoza also confessed that he too was guilty of an affair with their valet Dana Dameson, who was also Mendoza's maid of honor, and it was revealed that she was pregnant by him. The Hard Line stable (Simon Diamond, John Shane, Mike Tobin and The Solution) came out to the ring, however the two made up and later wrestled in the main event against The Solution (Havok and Papadon) and lost the titles to them. On December 10, 2004, they defeated The Solution for the JAPW Tag Team Championship at JAPW Seasons Beatings '04 in Rahway, New Jersey.

The Christopher Street Connection held the titles for over a month before losing to the Strong Style Thugs (B-Boy and Homicide) at JAPW Wildcard on January 28, 2005. On February 19, they defeated The Heartbreak Express (Sean and Phil Davis) at an ROH show. Appearing at the former ECW Arena, Buff E and Mace Mendoza also faced The Carnage Crew at an event celebrating JAPW's 100th wrestling show on March 26. The team also made appearances in United States Xtreme Wrestling and Jersey All Pro Wrestling during the next few months losing matches to The Carnage Crew and Billy Reil and Mike Tobin.

On May 21, the Christopher Street Connection appeared at the first Chris Candido Memorial Show hosted by UXW in Long Island, New York. They participated in a battle royal which included a number of former Extreme Championship Wrestling stars and other leading independent wrestlers including Bison Bravado, Danny Demanto, Jimmy Hustler, Eddie Guapo, Blade Michaels, Brolly, Mike Campbell, Ken Sweeney, New Dynamite Kid, Ron Sampson, Tony Lo, Heavy Metal, The Equalizer, Tony Devito, Johnny Candido, Balls Mahoney and Alere Little Feather among others. They also lost to The Masked Maniac and Shark Boy during the show.

Later during the event, the Christopher Street Connection confronted Billy Gunn following his win over Justin Credible. Upset at his WWF storyline with Chuck Palumblo, they attempted to attack him in the ring but were fought off by Gunn. They then accepted a challenge from Gunn to a tag team match in Queens, New York on September 24 where, in a reunion with longtime tag team partner "Road Dog" Jesse James, they faced and lost to the New Age Outlaws during the year.

Making appearances for UXW during the first half of 2006, the Christopher Street Connection lost to The Outcast Killahs (Oman Tortuga and Diablo Santiago) on February 3. Several months later at the second annual Chris Candido Memorial Show, they wrestled two matches in one night defeated Wacky Wayne and Ron Sampson in the first match before losing to Monsta Mack and Havok later in the evening. At an October 28 event for JAPW, they did manage to score a victory over Beef Wellington and SeXXXy Eddy.

=== Later career ===
In early-2007, the Christopher Street Connection faced and defeated female wrestlers Cha-Cha and Alicia in an intergender match at an April 21 JAPW show. On June 15, the Christopher Street Connection made their debut in World-1 South Pro Wrestling with The Honky Tonk Man at the Alee Shrine Temple in Savannah, Georgia. They also faced The Heartbreak Express in the first ever "Alternative Lifestyle San Francisco Street Fight" match at UXW's Xtreme Havoc at the Central Florida Fairgrounds Pavilion in Orlando, Florida. As a result of their victory, the CSC won the vacant UXW Tag Team Championship.

Appearing in several independent promotions during the summer, including AWA World 1 South and Wrestling Superstars Unleashed, they faced Team Macktion (Krazy K and T.J. Mack) and Dirty Rotten Scoundrels (E.C. Negro and Casey Blade). At Hell and Back on September 29, the Christopher Street Connection finally lost the tag team belts to Demolition (Ax and Smash), former 3-time WWF World Tag Team Champions, ending their three-month reign as champions. Buff E and Mendoza also feuded with Havoc & Monsta Mack in JAPW later that year.

== Championships and accomplishments ==
- Insane World Wrestling
  - IWW Tag Team Championship (1 time)
- Jersey All Pro Wrestling
  - JAPW Tag Team Championship (1 time)
- Long Island Wrestling Federation
  - LIWF Tag Team Championship (1 time)
- USA Xtreme Wrestling
  - UXW Tag Team Championship (1 time)
- Other titles
  - APR Tag Team Championship (1 time)
- Pro Wrestling Illustrated
  - PWI ranked Buff E # 368 of the 500 best singles wrestlers of the PWI 500 in 2004.
  - PWI ranked Mace Mendoza # 369 of the 500 best singles wrestlers of the PWI 500 in 2004.
