= EMLL 39th Anniversary Show (2) =

Mexican Professional wrestling show

EMLL 39th Anniversary Show #2
- Promotion: Empresa Mexicana de Lucha Libre
- Date: October 20, 1972
- City: Mexico City, Mexico
- Venue: Arena México
- Attendance: Unknown

Pay-per-view chronology
← Previous; 39th Anniversary (1)	Next → Juicio Final

EMLL Anniversary Show chronology
← Previous; 39th Anniversary (1)	Next → 40th Anniversary

Mexican professional wrestling promotion celebrated their 39th anniversary with two professional wrestling major shows centering on the anniversary date in September and October. The second EMLL 39th Anniversary Show (Spanish: 39. Aniversario de EMLL) took place on October 20, 1972 in Arena México, Mexico City, Mexico to commemorate the anniversary of EMLL, which over time became the oldest professional wrestling promotion in the world. The Anniversary show is EMLL's biggest show of the year. The EMLL Anniversary Show series is the longest-running annual professional wrestling show, starting in 1934.

== Production ==
=== Background ===
The 1972 Anniversary show commemorated the 39th anniversary of the Mexican professional wrestling company Empresa Mexicana de Lucha Libre (Spanish for "Mexican Wrestling Promotion"; EMLL) holding their first show on September 22, 1933 by promoter and founder Salvador Lutteroth. EMLL was rebranded early in 1992 to become Consejo Mundial de Lucha Libre ("World Wrestling Council"; CMLL) signal their departure from the National Wrestling Alliance. With the sales of the Jim Crockett Promotions to Ted Turner in 1988 EMLL became the oldest, still-operating wrestling promotion in the world. Over the years EMLL/CMLL has on occasion held multiple shows to celebrate their anniversary but since 1977 the company has only held one annual show, which is considered the biggest show of the year, CMLL's equivalent of WWE's WrestleMania or their Super Bowl event. CMLL has held their Anniversary show at Arena México in Mexico City, Mexico since 1956, the year the building was completed, over time Arena México earned the nickname "The Cathedral of Lucha Libre" due to it hosting most of EMLL/CMLL's major events since the building was completed. Traditionally EMLL/CMLL holds their major events on Friday Nights, replacing their regularly scheduled Super Viernes show.

=== Storylines ===
The event featured an undetermined number of professional wrestling matches with different wrestlers involved in pre-existing scripted feuds, plots and storylines. Wrestlers were portrayed as either heels (referred to as rudos in Mexico, those that portray the "bad guys") or faces (técnicos in Mexico, the "good guy" characters) as they followed a series of tension-building events, which culminated in a wrestling match or series of matches. Due to the nature of keeping mainly paper records of wrestling at the time no documentation has been found for some of the matches of the show.

== Event ==
The second of the 39th EMLL anniversary shows featured an unknown number of matches, traditionally EMLL has five to six matches per show, but at times have had more or less and the total number has not been verified. In one of the known matches Huracán Ramírez unsuccessfully challenged for the NWA World Welterweight Championship held by Karloff Lagarde, but Lagarde proved to be too tough as he defeated Ramírez two falls to one to retain the title. In the main event Alfonso Dantés and El Solitario face off in a singles match after having been on opposite teams in the tag team tournament final that took place at the first 39th Anniversary Show. The match between the two was for Dantés' NWA World Light Heavyweight Championship which he retained, avenging the tournament defeat at the hands of El Solitario and Ray Mendoza.

== Aftermath ==
Lagarde would hold the NWA World Welterweight Championship until July, 1971 where he lost the championship to Alberto Muñoz. Alfonso Dantés retained his NWA World Light Heavyweight Title until Kim Sung Ho defeated him on June 29, 1973.

== Results ==
No.	Results	Stipulations
1	Mazambula defeated El Rebelde	Singles match
2	José Luis Mendieta defeated Manuel Robles	Singles match
3	Chino Chow vs. Cesar Valentino ended in a time limit draw	Singles match
4	Ciclón Veloz Jr. defeated Coloso Colosetti	Singles match
5	Dr. Wagner and Gran Markus defeated Arpad Weber and Rayo de Jalisco	Tag team match
6	Karloff Lagarde (c) defeated Huracán Ramírez	Best two-out-of-three falls match for the NWA World Welterweight Championship
7	Alfonso Dantés (c) defeated El Solitario	Best two-out-of-three falls match for the NWA World Light Heavyweight Championship
(c) / – the champion(s) heading into the match
