= Cary Silkin =

American professional wrestling promoter

Cary Silkin is an American professional wrestling promoter. He was the owner of Ring of Honor (ROH) from 2004 to 2011 and served as an ambassador for the promotion from 2011 to 2022. In 2022 he became the inaugural winner of the promotion's Hall of Fame Legacy Award.

== Early life ==
Silkin grew up as a wrestling fan during the reign of Bruno Sammartino in WWWF.

== Career ==
Silkin owned the promotion Ring of Honor from 2004, when he bought it from Doug Gentry, until 2011 when it was sold to the Sinclair Broadcast Group. Afterwards he worked for the company as an ambassador between 2011 and 2022 before retiring. In 2022 he appeared on screen for All Elite Wrestling's television show AEW Dynamite. Later on in September that year he was storyline attacked by Chris Jericho.

== Personal life ==
Silkin said that he smoked cocaine in New York with Tony Atlas once in the late 1980s.

In October 2023 Silkin was briefly hospitalized.

== Accolades ==
- ROH Hall of Fame
  - Legacy Award (2022)
