= List of All Elite Wrestling personnel =

All Elite Wrestling (AEW) is an American professional wrestling promotion founded in 2019 and owned by the Khan family and Skydance. AEW personnel consists of professional wrestlers, managers, referees, commentators (including Spanish, French and German commentators), ring announcers, coaches, executives, and various other positions.

AEW is the sister promotion of Ring of Honor (ROH) and has partnerships with Japanese promotions New Japan Pro-Wrestling (NJPW), World Wonder Ring Stardom (Stardom), and CyberFight – encompassing Pro Wrestling Noah (NOAH), DDT Pro-Wrestling (DDT), and Tokyo Joshi Pro Wrestling (TJPW), Mexican promotion Consejo Mundial de Lucha Libre (CMLL), Canadian promotion Maple Leaf Pro Wrestling (MLP), and UK promotion Revolution Pro Wrestling (RevPro), as well as numerous other domestic and international promotions. Wrestlers and other personalities from those promotions may also make periodic appearances at AEW events. Championships from sister/partner promotions held by AEW wrestlers that have been defended on AEW programming are also noted.

AEW additionally has a training facility known as the Nightmare Factory, which is owned by AEW coach Q. T. Marshall; trainees from the facility may also make appearances at AEW events and on AEW programming.

== Khan family ==
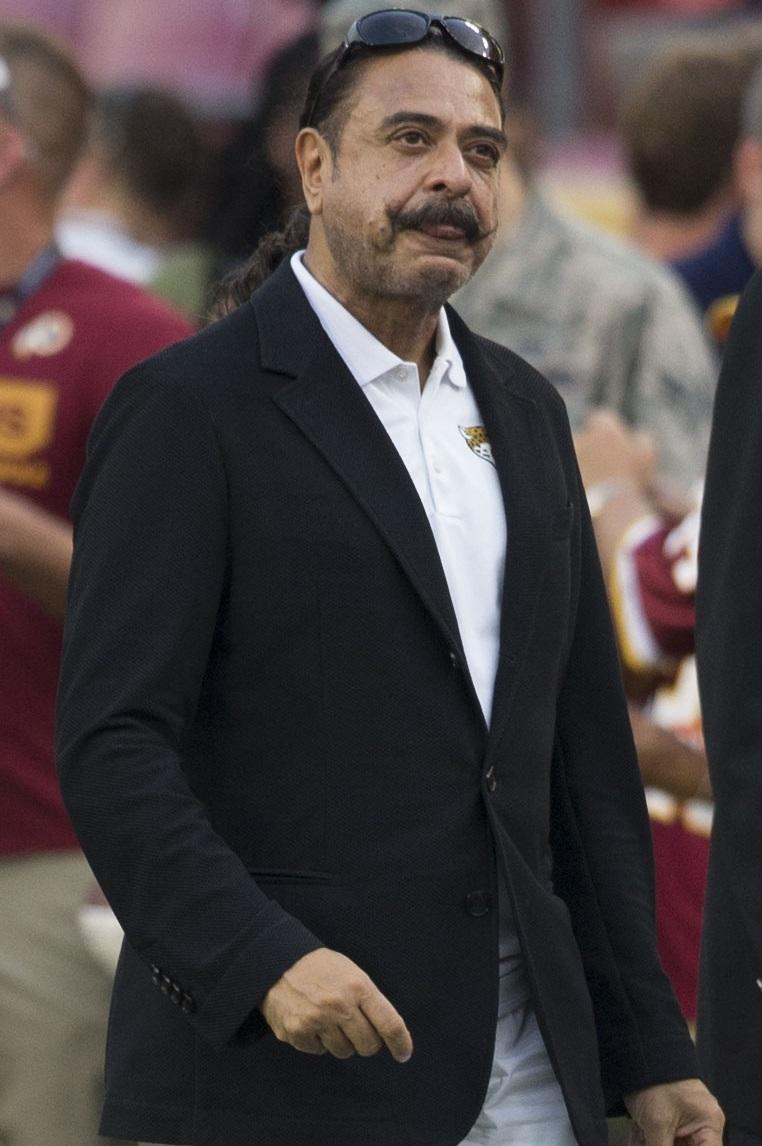
Shahid Khan

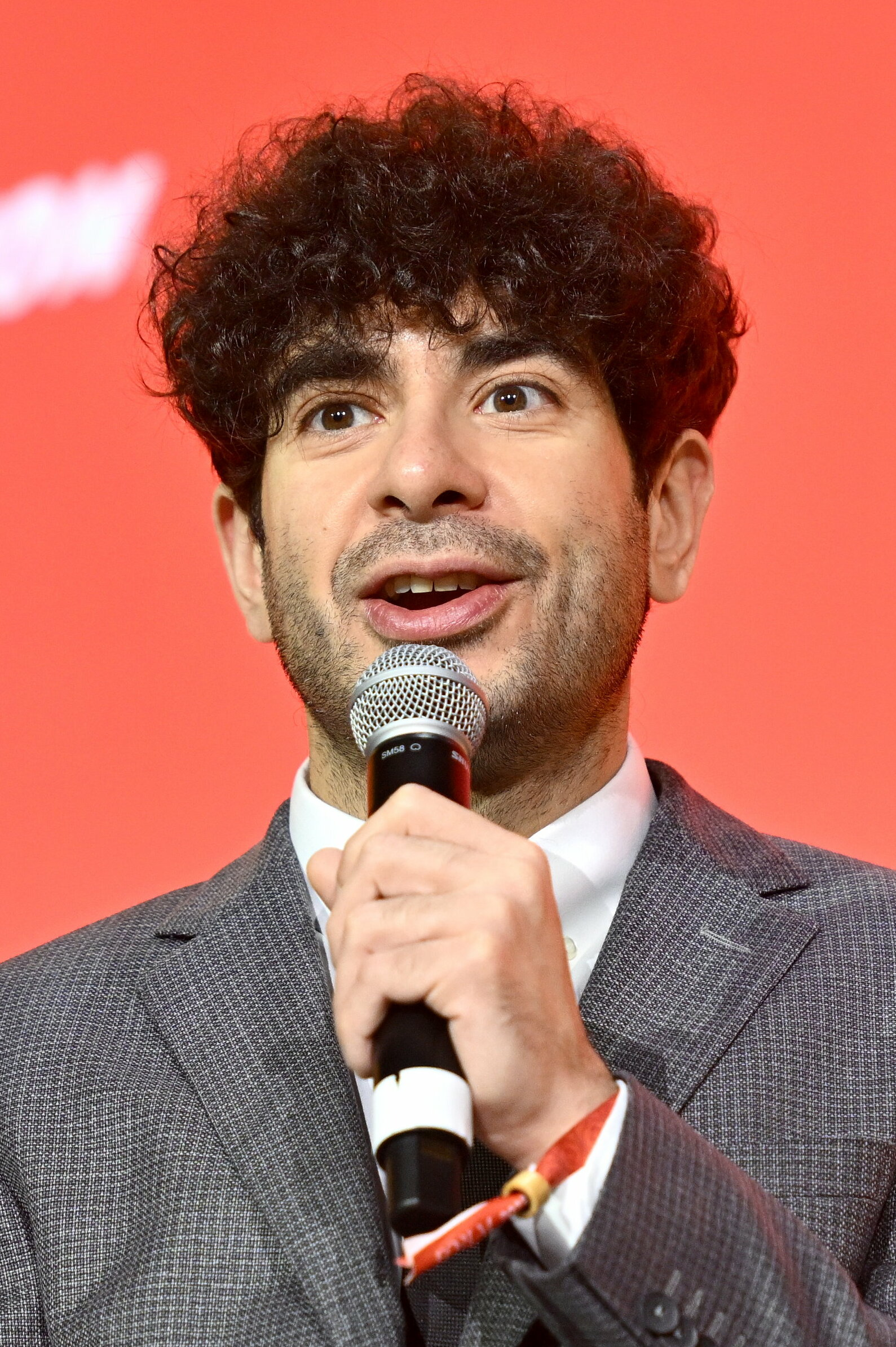
Tony Khan

Ring name	Real name	Notes
Shahid Khan	Shahid Khan	Lead investor
Tony Khan	Antony Khan	Founder; President; Chief Executive Officer; General Manager; Executive Producer; Head of Creative

== Roster ==
=== Men's division ===
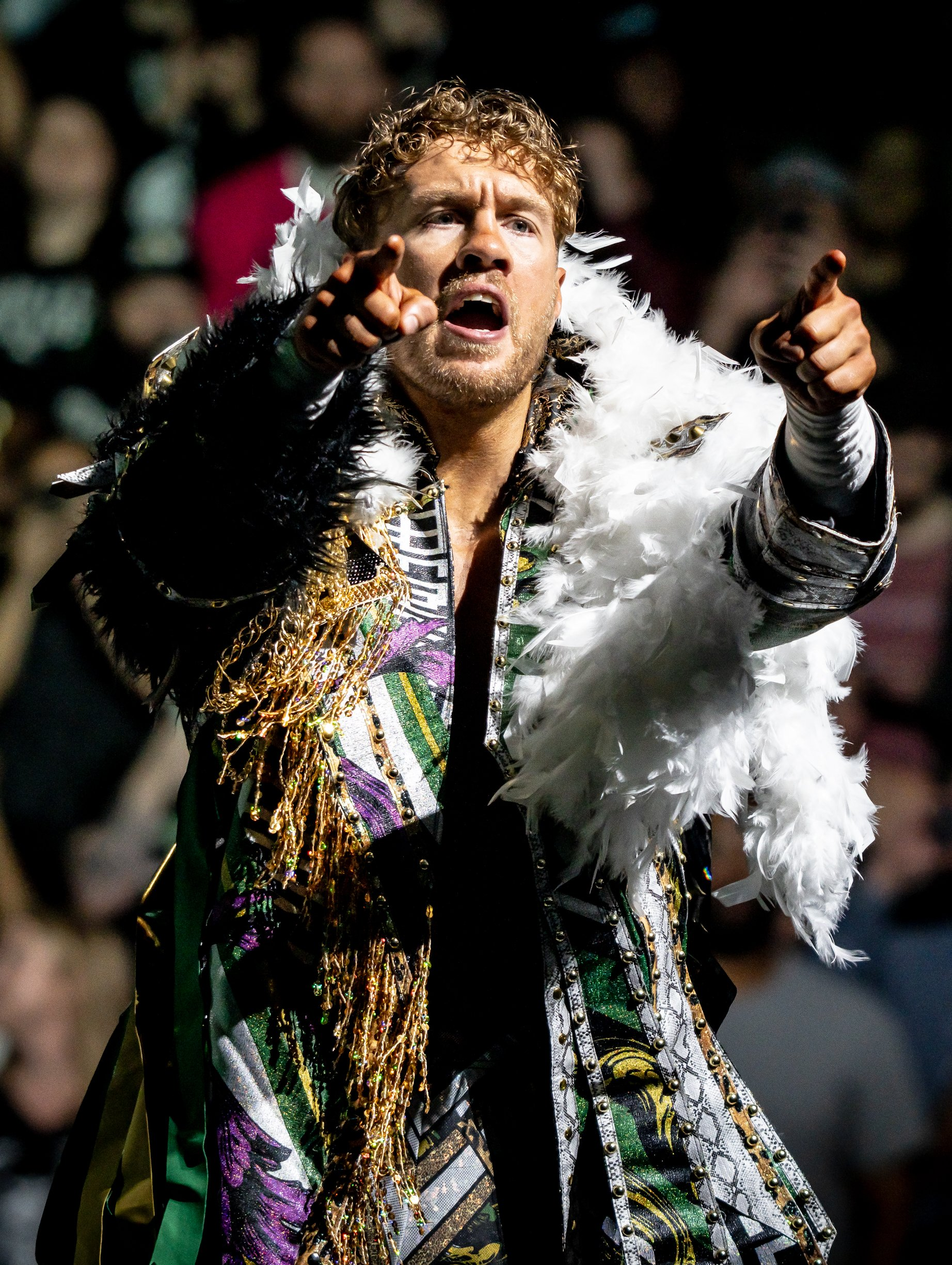
Will Ospreay

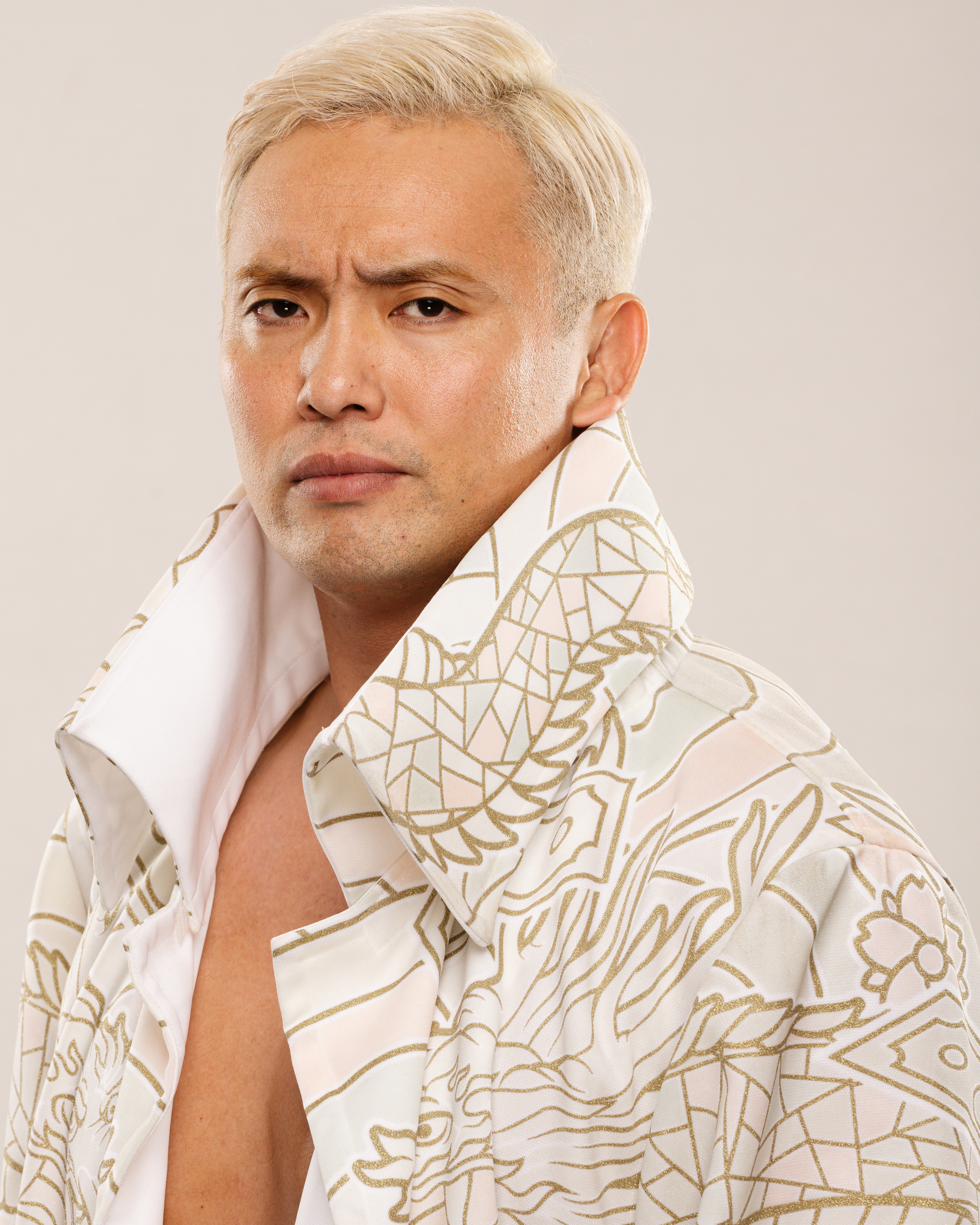
Kazuchika Okada

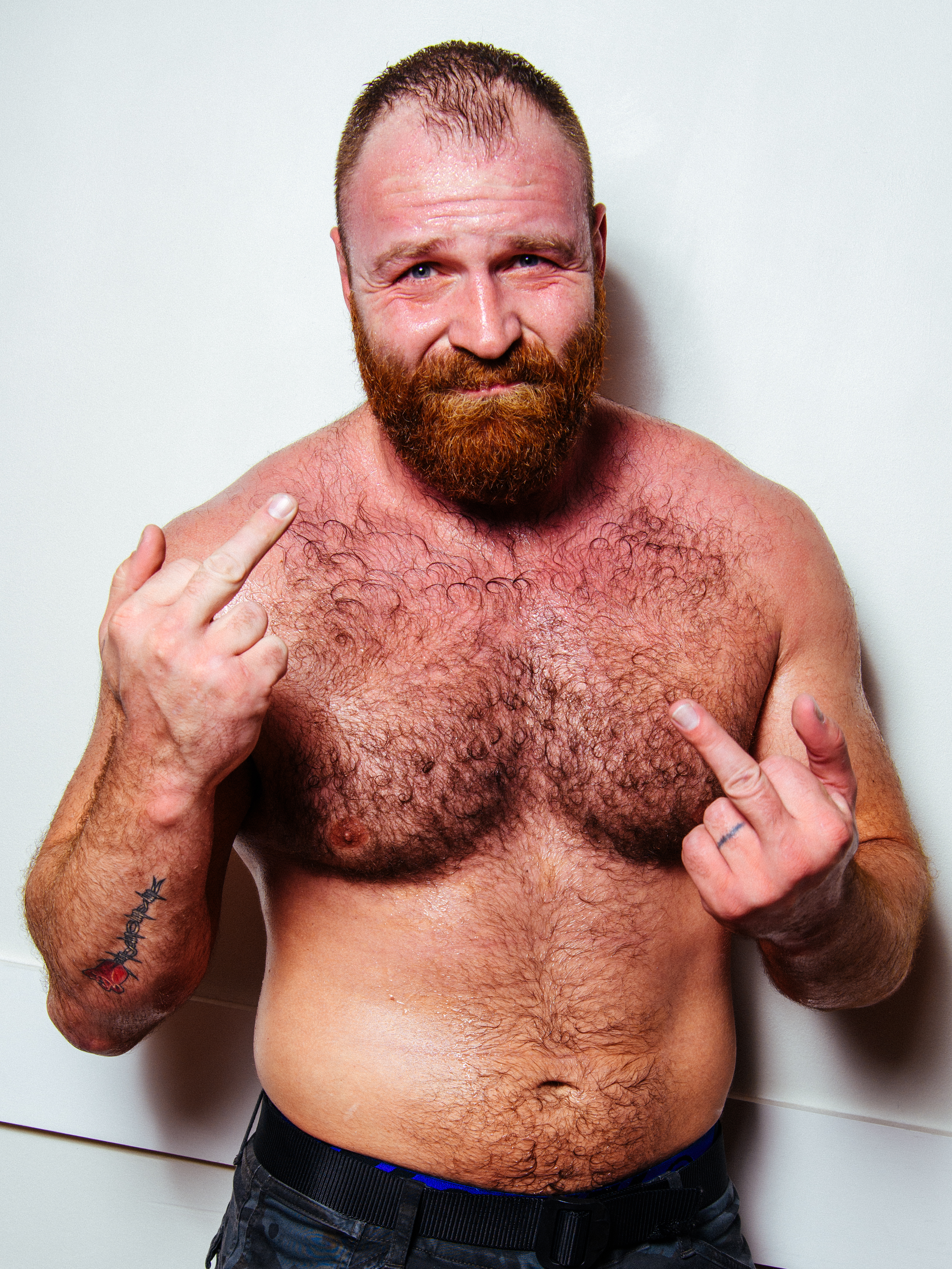
Jon Moxley

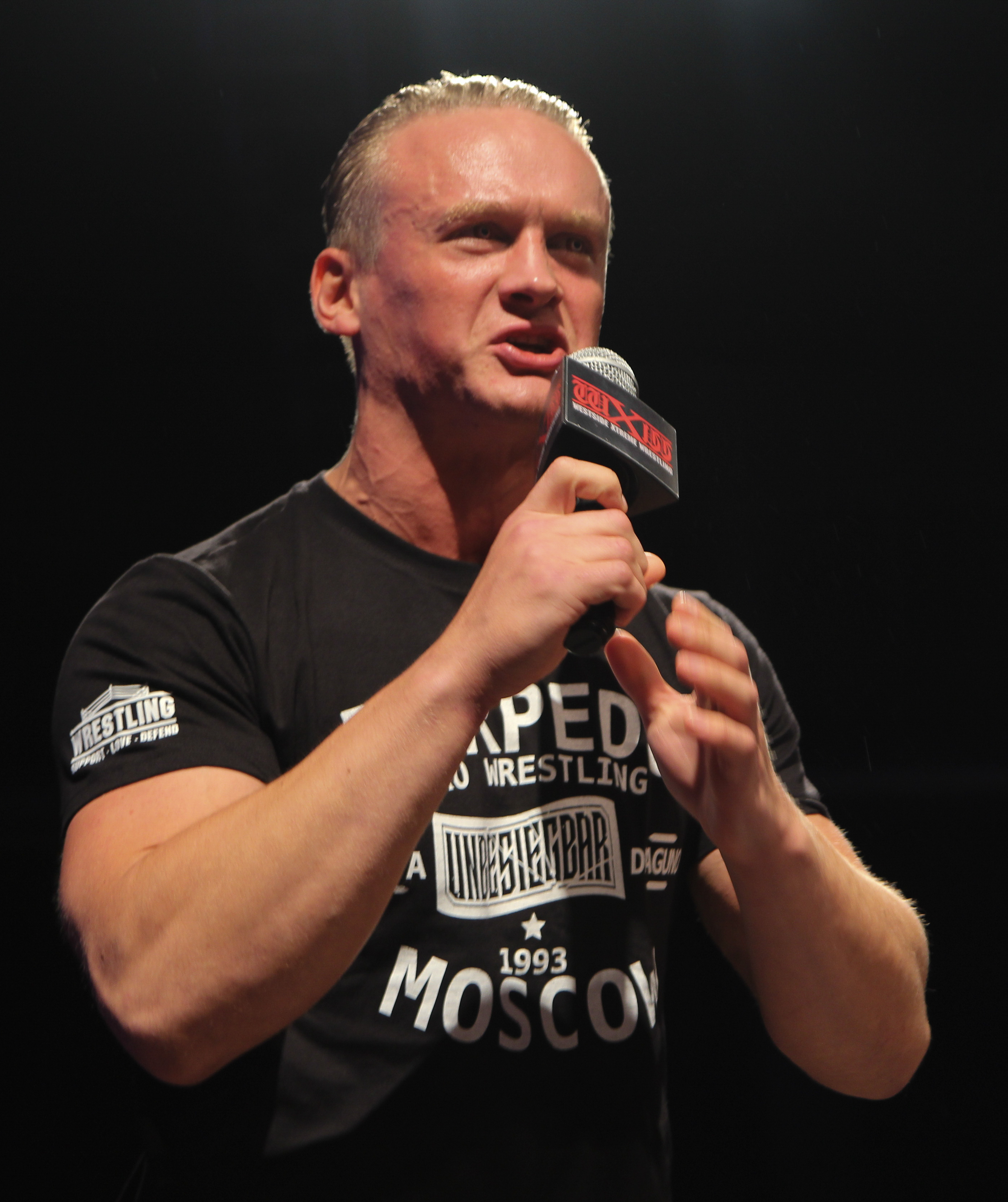
Ilja Dragunov

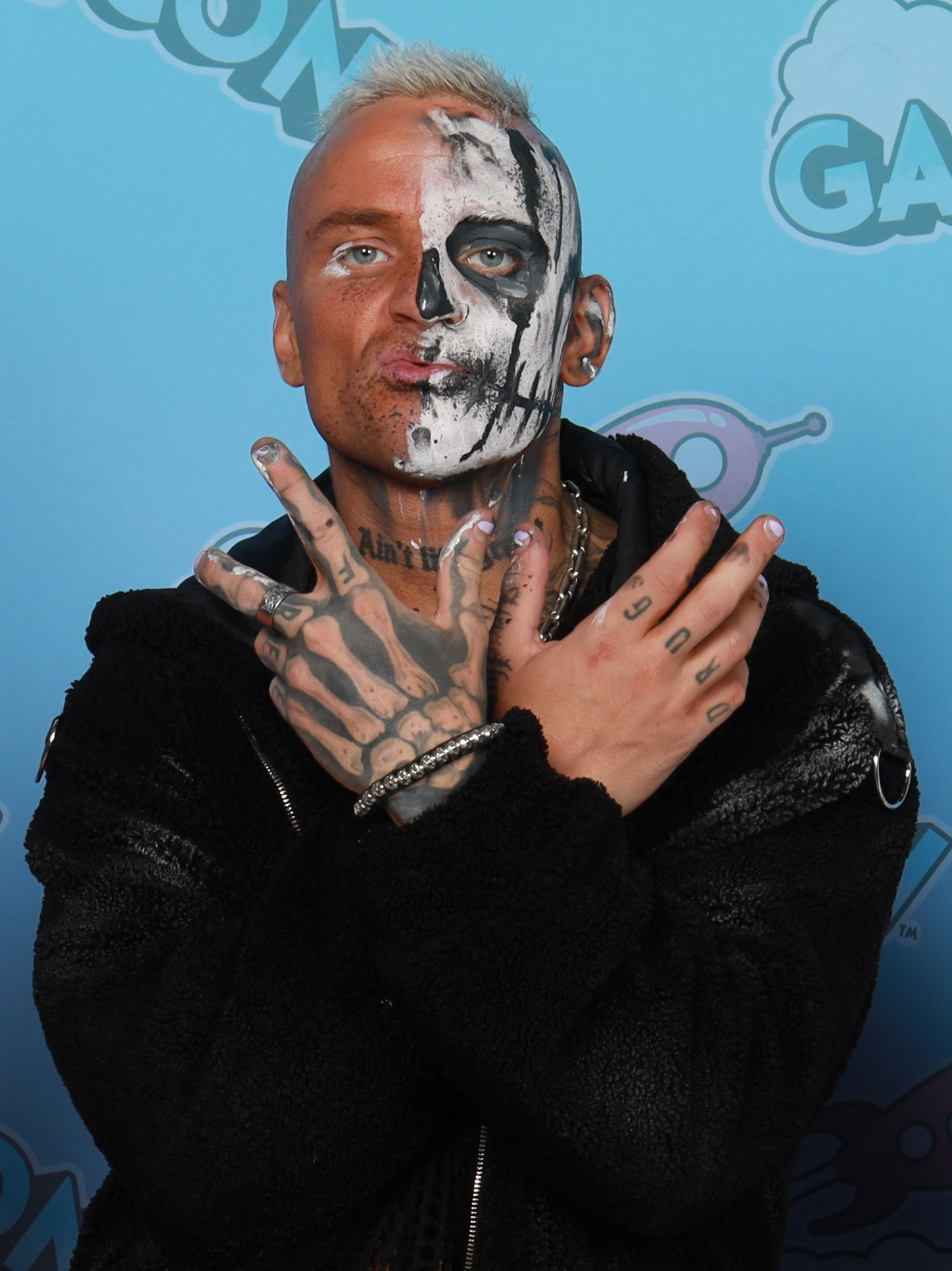
Darby Allin

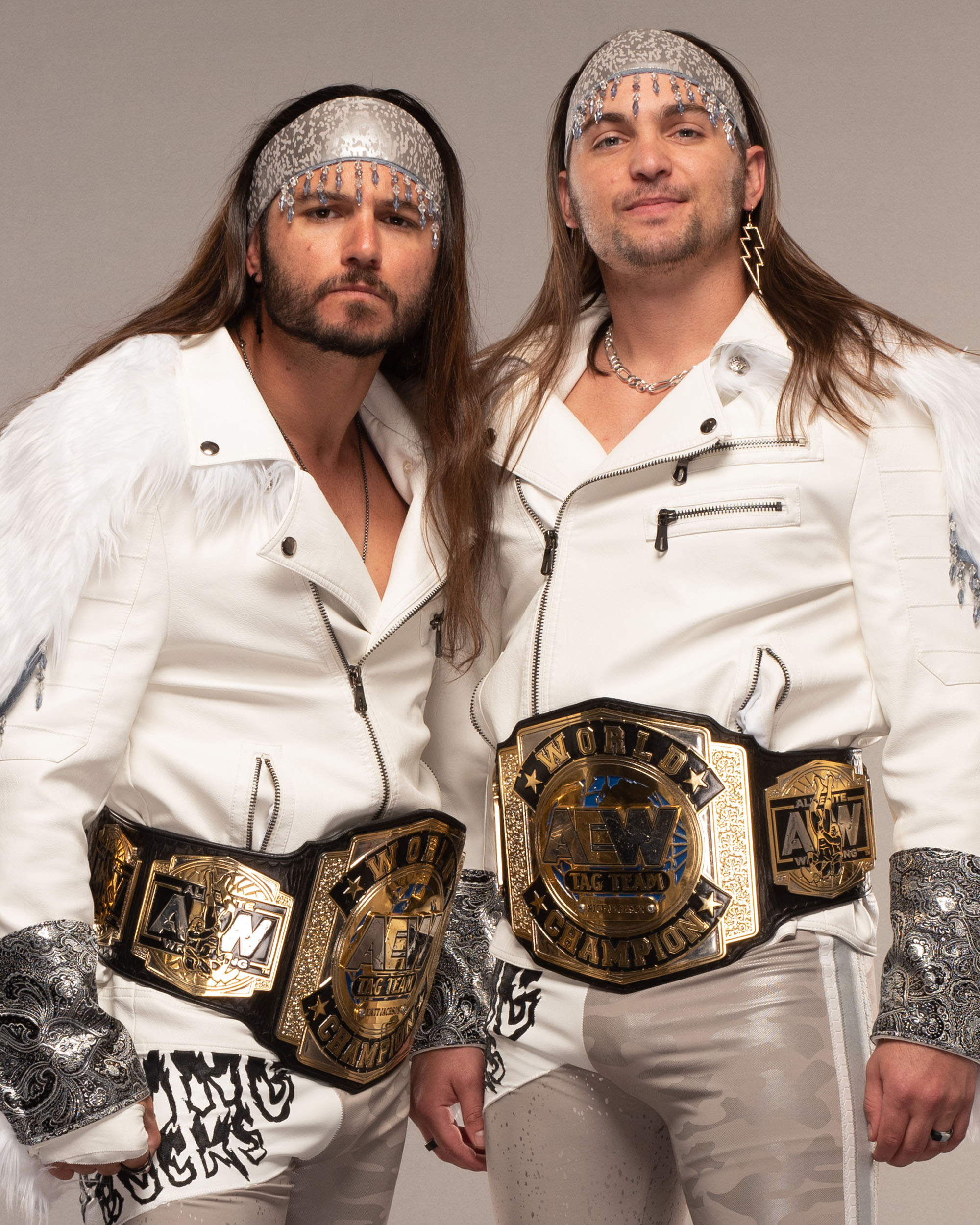
The Young Bucks - Matt Jackson (left) and Nick Jackson

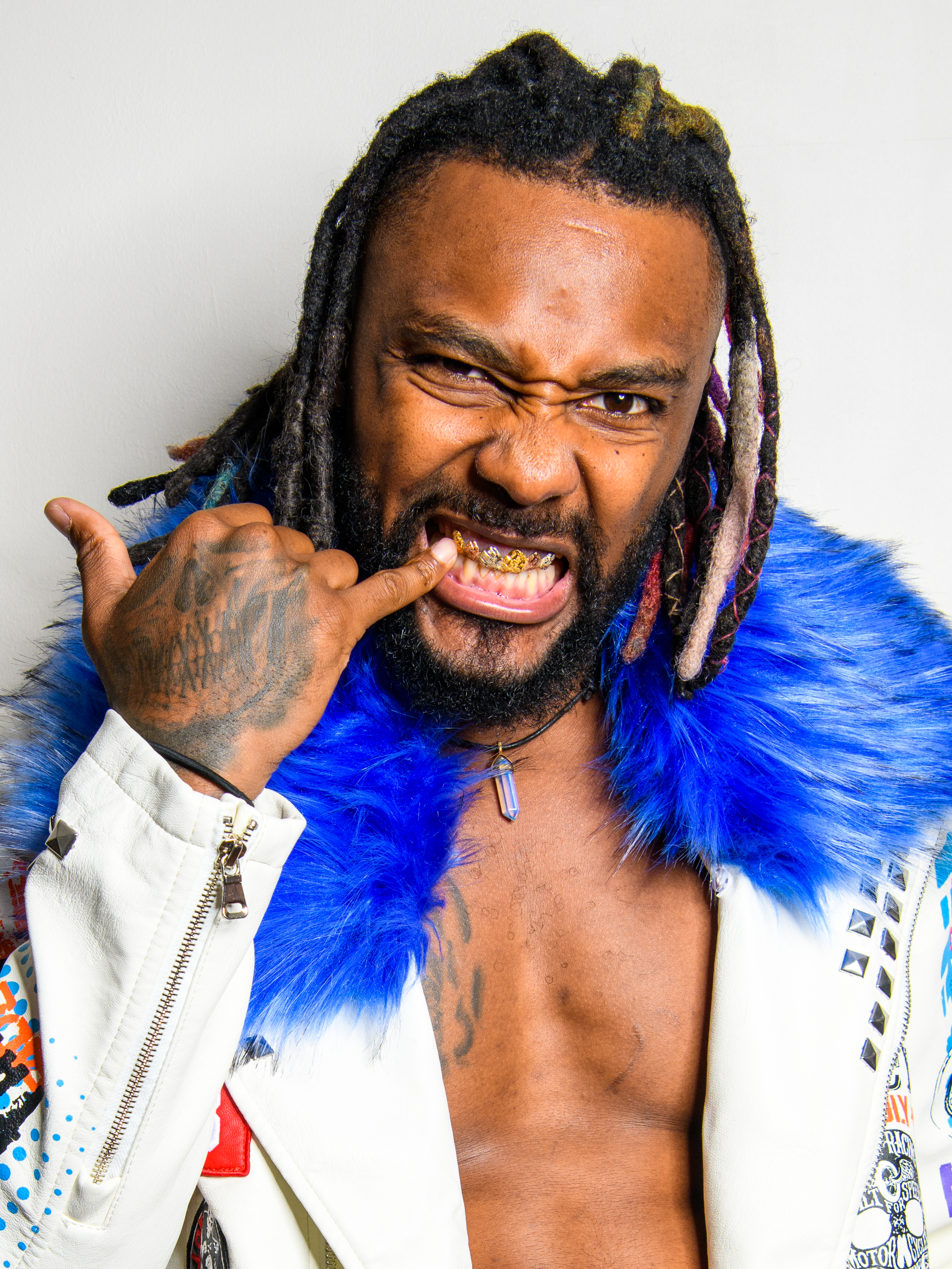
Swerve Strickland

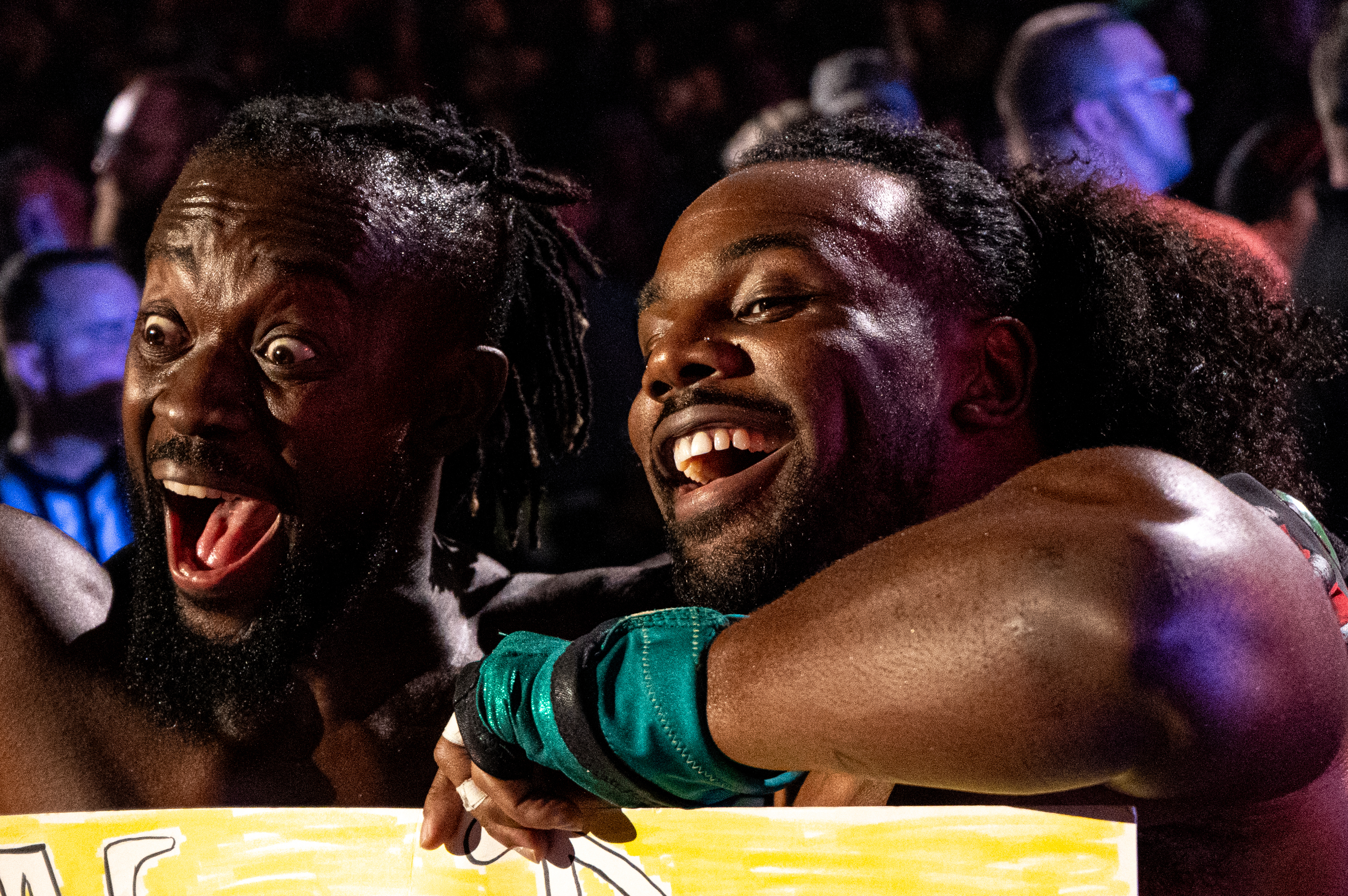
The New Level (Kofi and Austin Creed)

Ring name	Real name	Notes
Aaron Solo	Aaron Solow	
Ace Austin	Austin Highley	
Action Andretti	Tyler Reber	ROH World Television Champion
Adam Copeland	Adam Copeland	
"Hangman" Adam Page	Stephen Woltz	
Alec Price	Alec Parnell	
Alex Reynolds	Alex Zikos	
Alex Shelley	Patrick Martin	
Andrade El Idolo	Manuel Andrade Oropeza	Casino Gauntlet contract holder
Angélico	Adam Bridle	Coach; Spanish-language commentator
Angelo Parker	Jeffrey Parker	
Anthony Ogogo	Anthony Ogogo	
AR Fox	Thomas Ballester	
Ariya Daivari	Ariya Daivari	Coach
Austin Creed	Austin Watson	World Trios Champion
Austin Gunn	Austin Sopp	
Bandido	Undisclosed (Note: Per longstanding tradition, the identities of masked lucha libre wrestlers is kept secret from the general public. It is considered taboo for wrestlers, news media, or fans to report or speculate on the identities of masked lucha libre wrestlers.)	ROH World Champion
The Beast Mortos	Undisclosed	
Big Boom AJ	Andrew Befumo Jr.	
Billy Gunn	Monty Sopp	Coach
Bishop Kaun	Jasper Kange	
Blake Christian	Christian Hubble	ROH World Six-Man Tag Team Champion
Bobby Lashley	Franklin Lashley	
Brandon Cutler	Brandon Bogle	Executive content producer
Brian Cage	Brian Button	
Brody King	Nathan Blauvelt	
Bryan Keith	Bryan Keith	
Buddy Matthews	Matthew Adams	
Carlie Bravo	Unknown	
Cash Wheeler	Daniel Wheeler	Undisputed British Tag Team Champion
Chris Jericho	Christopher Irvine	Coach; Creative advisor
Chris Sabin	Joshua Harter	
Clark Connors	Connor Deutsch	
Claudio Castagnoli	Claudio Castagnoli	
Colt Cabana	Scott Colton	Coach
Colten Gunn	Colten Sopp	
Dalton Castle	Brett Giehl	
Daniel Garcia	Daniel Garcia	
Dante Martin	Dante Martin	
Darby Allin	Samuel Ratsch	TNT Champion
Darius Martin	Darius Martin	
David Finlay	David Finlay	
Dax Harwood	David Harwood	Undisputed British Tag Team Champion
Dezmond Xavier	Deveon Aikens	
Dralístico	Carlos Muñoz González	
Drew Kasper	Andrew Kasper	
Eddie Kingston	Edward Moore	
El Clon	Jonathan Barragán González	
Evil Uno	Nicolas Dansereau	
Gabe Kidd	Gabriel McMenamin	IWGP Global Heavyweight Champion
Garrett Borden	Garrett Borden	
Griff Garrison	Garrett Griffith	
Hechicero	Undisclosed	CMLL World Heavyweight Champion
Hook	Tyler Senerchia	
Ilja Dragunov	Ilja Rukober	National Champion
Jack Perry	Jack Perry	
Jacob Kasper	Jacob Kasper	
Jake Doyle	Jacob Doyle	
Jay Lethal	Jamar Shipman	ROH World Six-Man Tag Team Champion
Jay White	Jamie White	
Jeff Jarrett	Jeffrey Jarrett	
John Silver	John Silver	
Johnny TV	John Hennigan	
Jon Moxley	Jonathan Good	Continental Champion
Jordan Oliver	Jordan Oliver Jr.	
Josh Alexander	Joshua Lemay	MLP Canadian Champion
Josh Woods	Joshua Woods	
Juice Robinson	Joseph Robinson	
Katsuyori Shibata	Katsuyori Shibata	
Kazuchika Okada	Kazuchika Okada	International Champion
Kenny Omega	Tyson Smith	Executive Vice President
Kevin Knight	Kevin Knight	
Kip Sabian	Simon Kippen	
Kofi	Kofi Sarkodie-Mensah	World Trios Champion
Konosuke Takeshita	Konosuke Takeshita	
Kyle Fletcher	Kyle Fletcher	
Kyle O'Reilly	Kyle Greenwood	
Lance Archer	Lance Hoyt	
Lee Johnson	Lee Johnson	ROH World Six-Man Tag Team Champion
Lee Moriarty	Julian Moriarty	ROH Pure Champion
Lio Rush	Lionel Green	
Mansoor	Mansoor Al-Shehai	
Mark Davis	Davis Passfield	
Marshall Von Erich	Marshall Adkisson	
Máscara Dorada	Undisclosed	CMLL World Trios Champion; NWA World Historic Welterweight Champion; ROH World Tag Team Champion
Mason Madden	Brennan Williams	
Matt Menard	Matthew Menard-Lee	
Matt Jackson	Matthew Massie	World Tag Team Champion; Executive Vice President
Matt Sydal	Matthew Korklan	
"Speedball" Mike Bailey	Émile Baillargeon-Laberge	
Mike Bennett	Michael Bennett	
Místico	Luis Urive Alvirde	CMLL World Light Heavyweight Champion; CMLL World Trios Champion; IWGP Junior Heavyweight Tag Team Champion; ROH World Tag Team Champion
MJF	Maxwell Friedman	
MVP	Hassan Assad	
Myron Reed	Myron Reed	
Nick Jackson	Nicholas Massie	World Tag Team Champion; Executive Vice President
Nick Comoroto	Nicholas Comoroto	
Nick Wayne	Nicholas Finley	
Nigel McGuinness	Steven Haworth	Commentator for Collision; Pay-per-view commentator
Orange Cassidy	James Cipperly	Coach
Ortiz	Miguel Molina	Coach
Preston Vance	Cody Vance	
Q. T. Marshall	Michael Cuellari	Vice President of Show and Creative Coordination; Nightmare Factory owner/trainer Coach; Creative staff
Ricochet	Trevor Mann	
Rocky Romero	John Rivera	Coach
Roderick Strong	Christopher Lindsey	
Ross Von Erich	Ross Adkisson	
Rush	William Muñoz González	
Sammy Guevara	Samuel Guevara	
Samoa Joe	Nuufolau Seanoa	ROH Hall of Famer
Satnam Singh	Satnam Bhamara	
Scorpio Sky	Schuyler Andrews	
Serpentico	Jonathan Cruz Rivera	Spanish-language commentator Coach; Also wrestles under the ring name Jon Cruz
Shane Taylor	Mark Shepherd	
Shawn Dean	Shawn McBride	Community Outreach Team member Extras coordinator
Shelton Benjamin	Shelton Benjamin	
Steven Borden	Steven Borden Jr.	
Swerve Strickland	Stephon Strickland	World Trios Champion
Tehuti Miles	Tehuti Miles	
Toa Liona	Bruce Leaupepe	
Tommaso Ciampa	Tommaso Whitney	
Tommy Billington	Thomas Billington	
Tony Nese	Anthony Nese	Coach
Trent Beretta	Gregory Marasciulo	
Truth Magnum	Shiloh Mount	
Turbo Floyd	Randy Kaufman	
Wheeler Yuta	Paul Gruber	
Will Ospreay	William Ospreay	World Champion
Wardlow	Michael Wardlow	
Zachary Wentz	Zachary Green	

=== Women's division ===
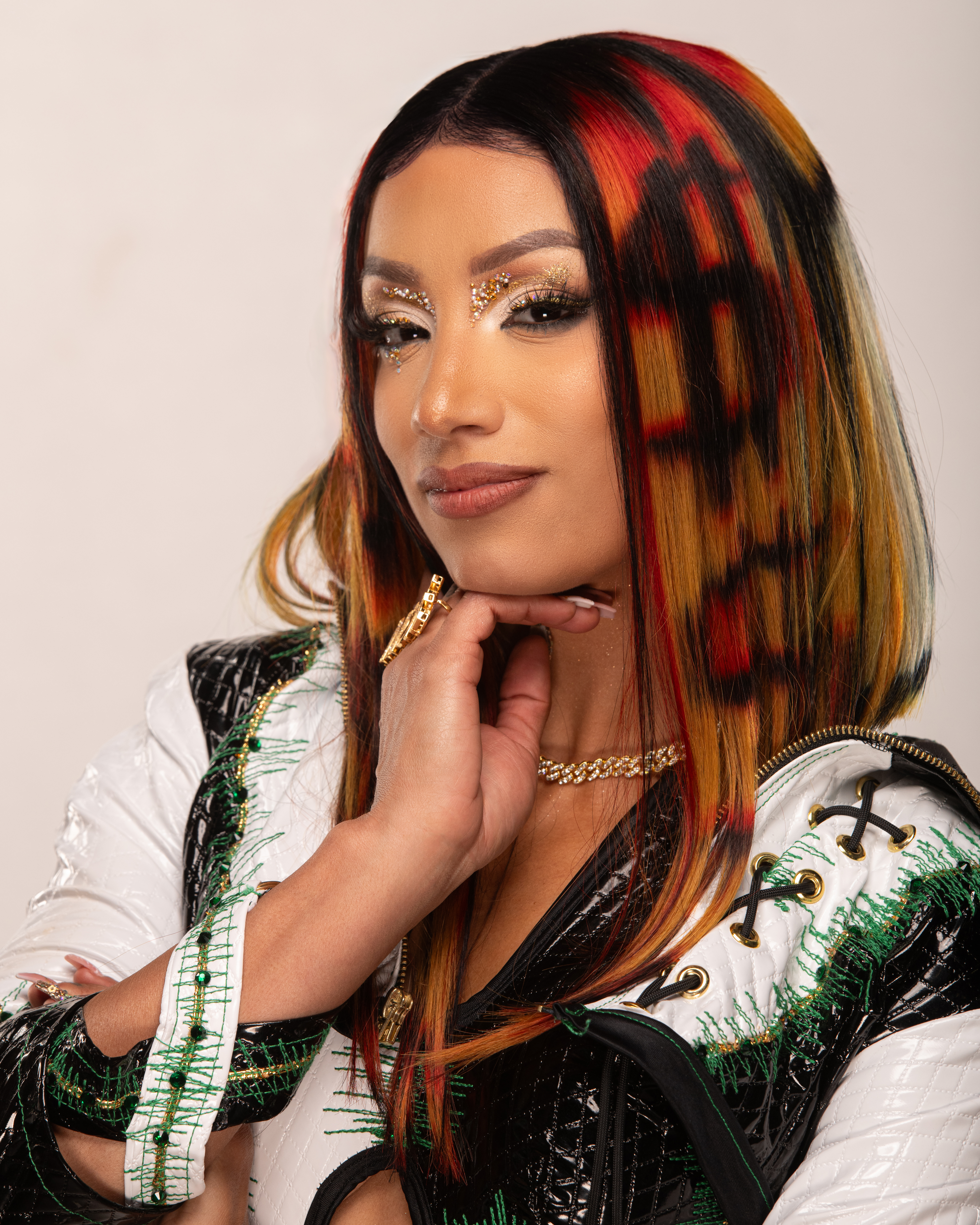
Mercedes Moné

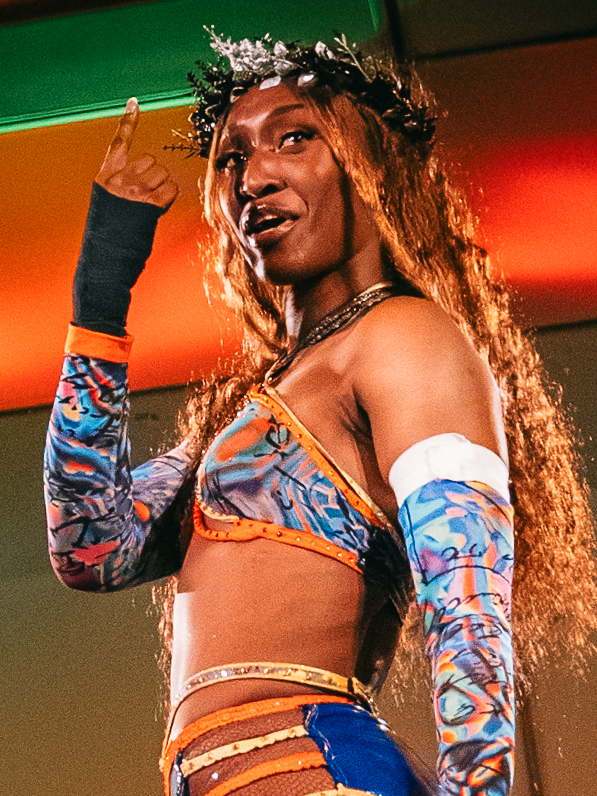
Queen Aminata

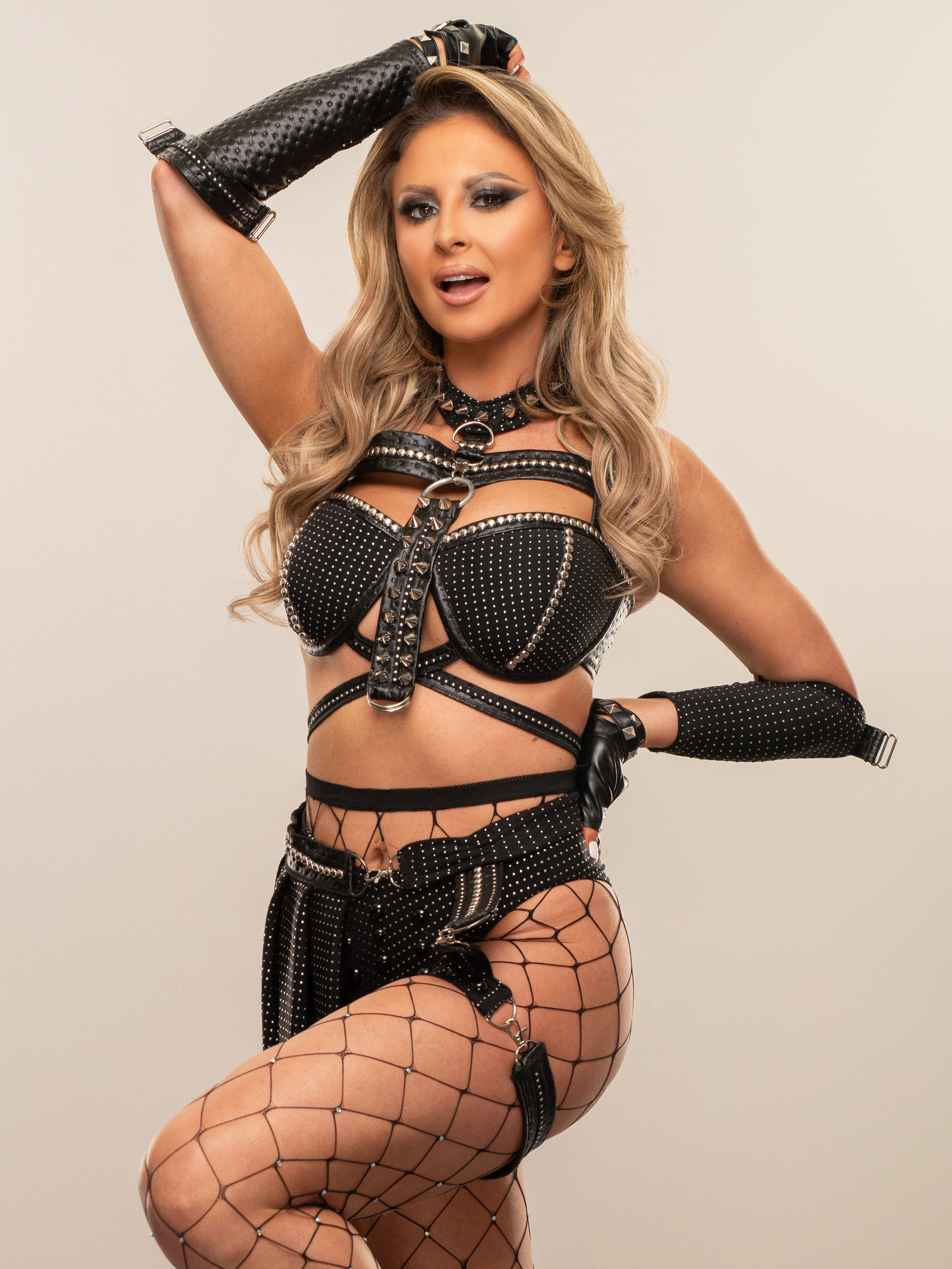
Harley Cameron

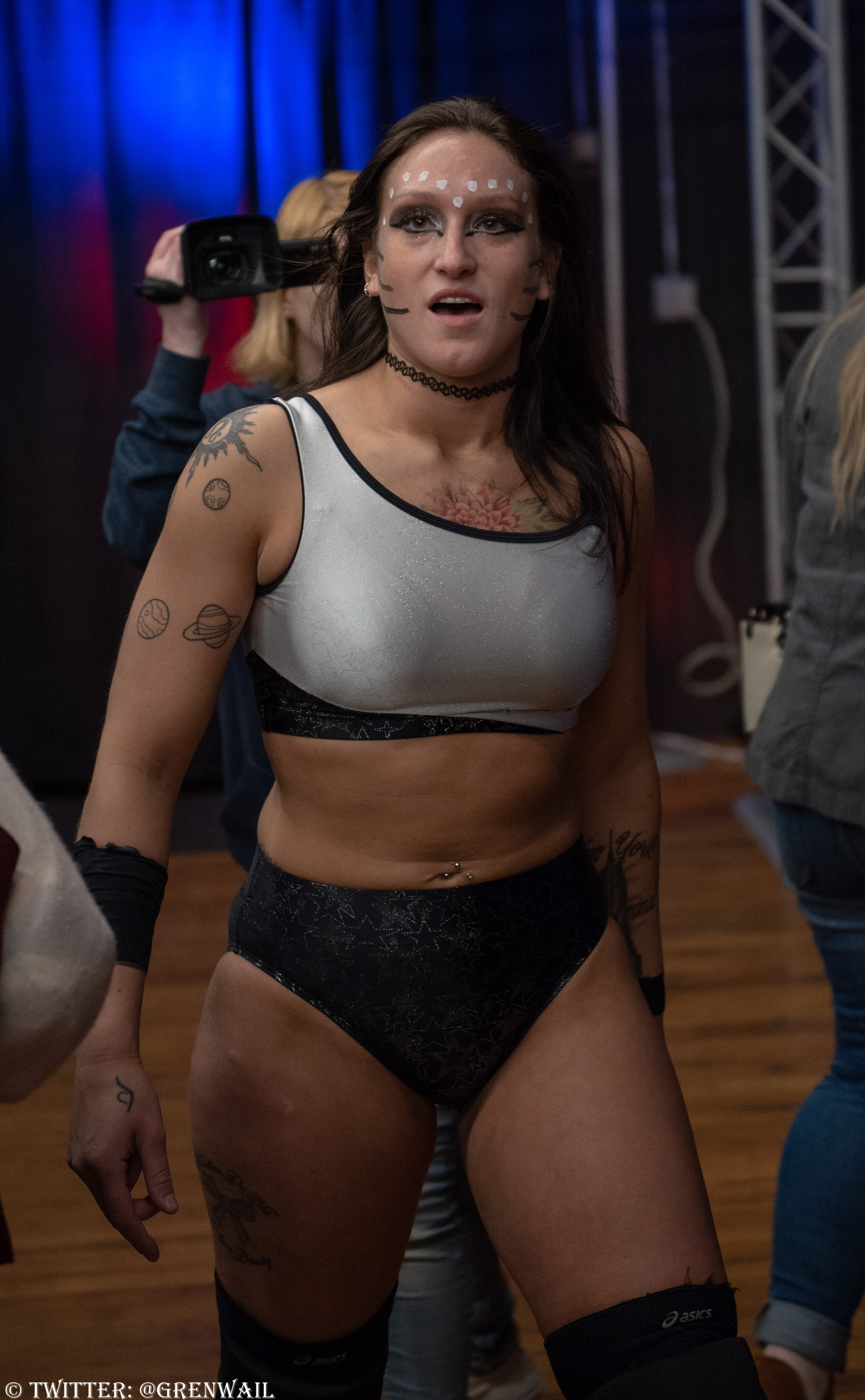
Kris Statlander

Ring name	Real name	Notes
Alex Windsor	Alice Ospreay	Strong Women's Champion
Athena	Adrienne Palmer	ROH Women's World Champion
Billie Starkz	Lillian Bridget	
Cassie Lee	Cassandra Arneill	
Dani Luna	Chloe Smyth	
Deonna Purrazzo	Deonna Purrazzo	ROH Women's Pure Champion
Diamanté	Priscilla Zúñiga	
Dr. Britt Baker, D.M.D.	Brittany Baker	
Emi Sakura	Emi Motokawa	
Harley Cameron	Danielle Glanville	Women's World Tag Team Champion
Hikaru Shida	Hikaru Shida	
Hyan	Hyaneyoung Gerard	
Jamie Hayter	Paige Wooding	
Julia Hart	Julia Hart	Artist of Stardom Champion
Kamille	Kailey Latimer	
Kris Statlander	Kristen Stadtlander	Women's World Tag Team Champion
Lena Kross	Undisclosed	
Mara Sadé	Jamara Garrett	
Marina Shafir	Marina Shafir	
Maya World	Ashanti Wilson-Stevenson	
Megan Bayne	Megan Doheny	
Mercedes Moné	Mercedes Kaestner Varnado	Women's World Champion
Mina Shirakawa	Mina Shirakawa	
Nyla Rose	Undisclosed	
Persephone	Priscilla Miranda	CMLL World Women's Champion
Queen Aminata	Aminata Sylla	TBS Champion
Rachael Ellering	Rachael Ellering	
Riho	Undisclosed	
Serena Deeb	Serena Deeb	Coach
Skye Blue	Skylar Dolecki	Artist of Stardom Champion
Tatevik	Tatevik Hunanyan	
Thekla	Thekla Kaischauri	Artist of Stardom Champion
Thunder Rosa	Melissa Cervantes	Mexican National Women's Champion
VertVixen	Alicia Bellamy-Caudillo	
Viva Van	Victoria Tran	
Willow Nightingale	Danielle Paultre	
Yuka Sakazaki	Yuka Sakazaki	
Zayda Steel	Fatima Zahra	

=== Other on-air personnel ===
Ring name	Real name	Notes
Christopher Daniels	Christopher Covell	Manager of Sky Flight; VP of Talent Relations; Coach; Creative staff
Don Callis	Donald Callis	Manager of The Don Callis Family; Backstage consultant
Karen Jarrett	Karen Jarrett	Manager of Jeff Jarrett
"Smart" Mark Sterling	Mark Rattelle	Manager of The Varsity Athletes; Occasional wrestler
Mother Wayne	Shayna Wayne	Manager of Nick Wayne
Mr. Brodie Lee Jr.	Brodie Huber	Leader of The Dark Order; Trainee; Also known by the ring name Negative 1
Prince Nana	Nana Bandoh	Manager of Swerve Strickland and The New Level
Stokely	Stokely Hathaway	Manager of FTR and Kasper Brothers

== PUP list ==
AEW has established a PUP (physically unable to perform) list for wrestlers who are currently out with a legitimate injury, and thus not able to wrestle.

Ring name	Real name	Reason	Notes
Adam Cole	Austin Jenkins	Head injury	
Anna Jay	Anna Jernigan	Shoulder surgery	
Christian Cage	William Reso	Broken ribs Collapsed lung	
Dustin Rhodes	Dustin Runnels	Knee surgery	Coach
Hologram	Undisclosed	Knee surgery	
Isiah Kassidy	Isiah Kassidy	Undisclosed injury	
Jessie McKay	Jessica McKay	Maternity leave	
Keith Lee	Keith Lee II	Undisclosed injuries	
Komander	Undisclosed	Undisclosed injury	
Kota Ibushi	Kota Ibushi	Fractured femur	
Leila Grey	Catherine Guzman	Torn ACL	
Luchasaurus	Austin Matelson	Shoulder injury	
Mark Briscoe	Mark Pugh	Undisclosed injury	ROH Hall of Famer
Marq Quen	DeQuentin Redden	Undisclosed injury	
Penelope Ford	Penelope Ford	Sprained ankle	
Peter Avalon	Peter Hernandez	Knee surgery	
Red Velvet	Stephanie Cardona	Neck injury	
Rebel	Tanea Brooks	Amyotrophic lateral sclerosis	
Ruby Soho	Dori Prange	Maternity leave	
Toni Storm	Toni Rossall	Undisclosed injury	

== Referees ==
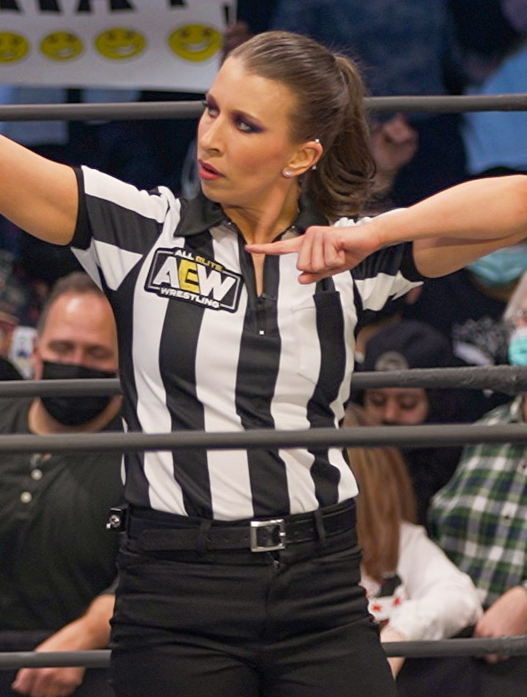
Aubrey Edwards

Ring name	Real name	Notes
Aubrey Edwards	Brittany Aubert	Project coordinator
Brandon Martinez	Brandon Martinez	
Bryce Remsburg	Bryce Remsburg	Travel coordinator
Mike Posey	Michael Posey	
Paul Turner	Paul Turner	Senior referee
Rick Knox	Rick Knox	
Stephon Smith	Stephon Smith	

== Broadcast team ==
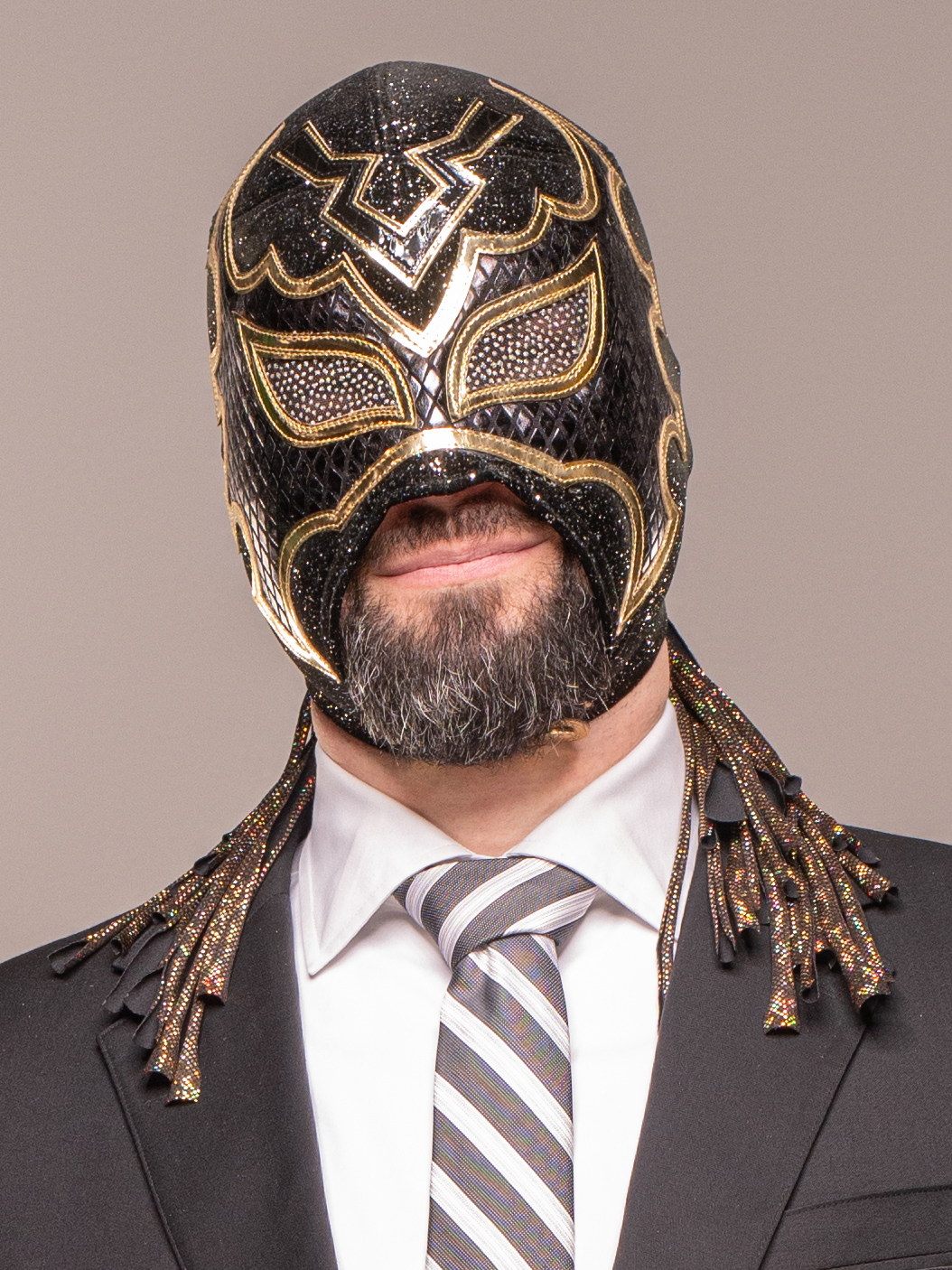
Excalibur

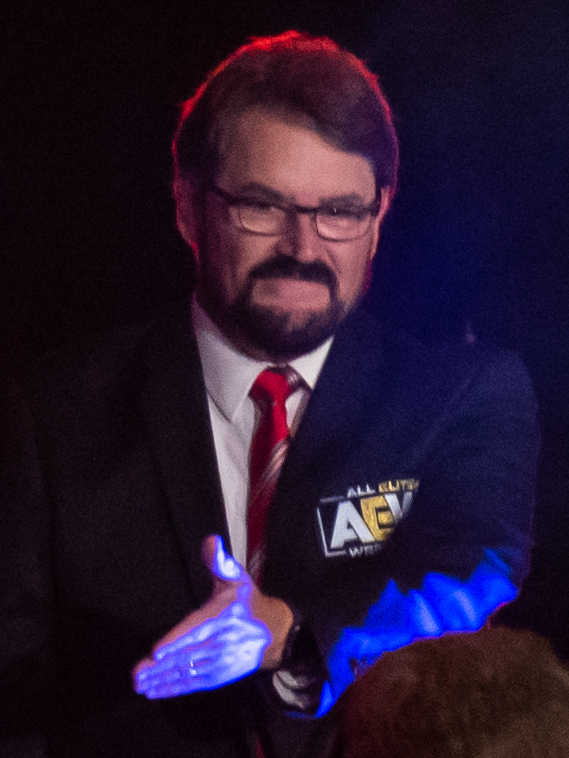
Tony Schiavone

Ring name	Real name	Notes
Alain Mistrangélo	Alain Mistrangélo	French-language commentator
Alex Marvez	Alex Marvez	Backstage interviewer
Alicia Atout	Alicia Atout-Friedman	Backstage interviewer
Alvaro Riojas	Unknown	Spanish-language commentator
Ariel Levy	Ariel Levy	Spanish-language commentator
Arkady Aura	Arkady Unterleidner	Backstage interviewer Ring announcer for Ring of Honor Wrestling
Bobby Cruise	Bobby Cruise	Ring announcer for Collision and Ring of Honor Wrestling
Carlos Cabrera	Carlos Rodrigo Cabrera	Spanish-language commentator
Excalibur	Marc Letzmann	Play-by-play commentator for Dynamite; Pay-per-view commentator Marketing manager
Ian Riccaboni	Ian Riccaboni	Play-by-play commentator for Ring of Honor Wrestling; Backup announcer for Collision and Dynamite
Jim Ross	James Ross	Pay-per-view commentator Senior advisor
Justin Roberts	Justin Roberts	Ring announcer for Dynamite and pay per views
Lexy Nair	Alexandra Nair	Backstage interviewer Host of Outside The Ring
Melissa Santos	Melissa Santos	Backstage interviewer
Mick Foley	Michael Foley	Backstage interviewer Pay-per-view preshow host Legends program
Mike Ritter	Michael Ritter	German-language commentator
Norbert Feuillan	Norbert Feuillan	French-language commentator
Oliver Copp	Oliver Copp	German-language commentator
Paul Wight	Paul Wight II	Commentator for Collision; Coach; ROH Board of Directors member Community Outreach Team member Occasional wrestler
Renee Paquette	Renee Paquette	Backstage interviewer Pay-per-view preshow host Interview/Announcer producer
RJ City	RJ Skinner	Backstage interviewer Creative staff
Taz	Peter Senerchia	Commentator for Dynamite; Pay-per-view commentator
Tony Schiavone	Noah Schiavone	Play-by-play commentator for Collision; Commentator for Dynamite; Pay-per-view commentator Senior producer Special advisor

== Coaches (producers) ==
Dean Malenko

Ring name	Real name	Notes
Bryan Danielson	Bryan Danielson	ROH Hall of Famer; Creative staff
Chris Hero	William Spradlin	
Chuck Taylor	Dustin Howard	
Dean Malenko	Dean Simon	Senior coach Creative staff
Glacier	Raymond Lloyd	
Jerry Lynn	Jeremy Lynn	ROH Board of Directors member Creative staff
Josh Mathews	Joshua Lomberger	Interview/Announcer producer
Kevin Matthews	Kevin McDonald	
Kevin Von Erich	Kevin Adkisson	Legends program
Luther	Len Olson	
Madison Rayne	Ashley Lomberger	
Michael Nakazawa	Masatsugu Nakazawa	Occasional wrestler
Nathan Cruz	Nathan Irwin	Occasional wrestler
Robert Evans	Robert Evans	Creative staff
Scotty 2 Hotty	Scott Garland	

== Backstage personnel ==
Name	Notes
Amanda Huber	Community Outreach Team member
Jake Manning	Merchandising; Occasional wrestler
Katelyn Borden	Director of Community Engagement
Katie Hebner	P.A. ROH referee
Mikey Rukus	AEW Music composer/producer
Ric Flair (Richard Fliehr)	Ambassador; Legends program
Scott Antol	Logistical support
Sting (Steven Borden Sr.)	Ambassador; Legends program

== Front office ==
=== Vice Presidents ===
Name	Department	Other duties (if applicable)
Chris Harrington	Business Strategy	
Jennifer Pepperman	Content Development	Creavtive staff
Michael Mansury	Executive VP of AEW	Head of Global Production
Nik Sobic	Business Operations	
Pat Buck (Patrick Buckridge)	Talent Development	Coach; Occasional wrestler Creative staff
Shane Emerson	Global Programming and Partnerships	
Sonjay Dutt (Retesh Bhalla)	Production and Creative Coordination	Coach; Creative staff

=== Executives ===
Name	Notes
Adam Hopkins	Public Relations head
Chad Glenn	Chief Financial Officer
David Ellison	Chairman and CEO of Skydance
Jeremy Flynn	Senior Marketing Director of Live Events
Kosha Irby	Chief Operating Officer
Margaret Stalvey	Legal coordinator
Mark Caplan	Head of Licensing and Merchandising
Megha Parekh	Chief Legal Officer
Will Washington	Wrestling Administration Coordinator; Creative staff

== See also ==
- List of Ring of Honor personnel
- List of former All Elite Wrestling personnel
- List of professional wrestlers
