= List of former All Elite Wrestling personnel =

All Elite Wrestling is an American professional wrestling promotion and entertainment company based in Jacksonville, Florida. Former employees in AEW consist of professional wrestlers, managers, valets, play-by-play and color commentators, announcers, interviewers, referees, trainers, script writers, executives, and members of the board of directors.

They primarily appeared on AEW television programming, pay-per-views, and live events. When talent is released of their contract, it could due to retirement, personal reasons, time off, budget cuts, the individual may have asked for their release or their contract was not renewed. In some cases, talent has died while they were contracted, such as Mr. Brodie Lee and Pac.

Those who made appearances without a contract and those who were previously released but are currently employed by AEW are not included.

== Personnel ==
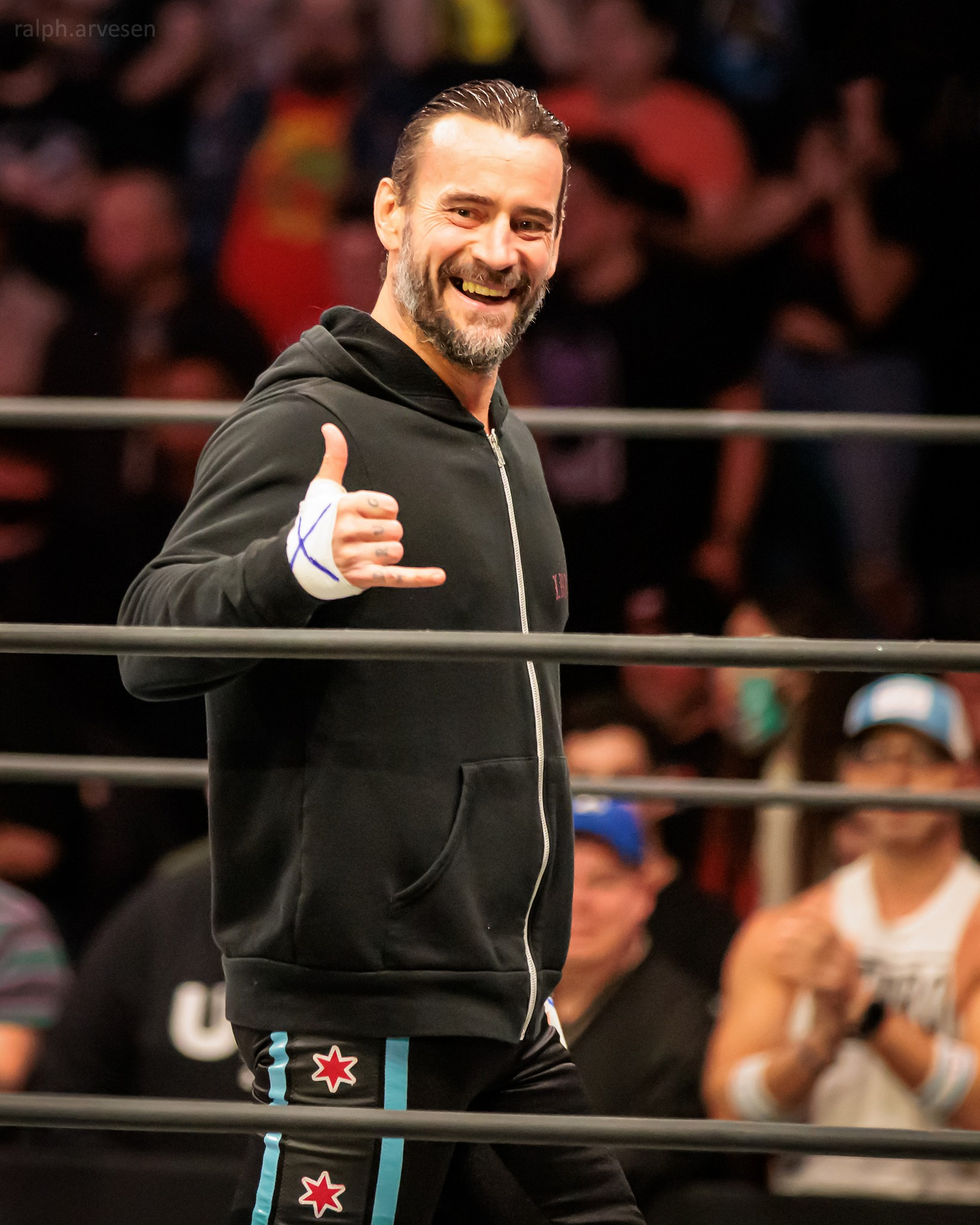
CM Punk

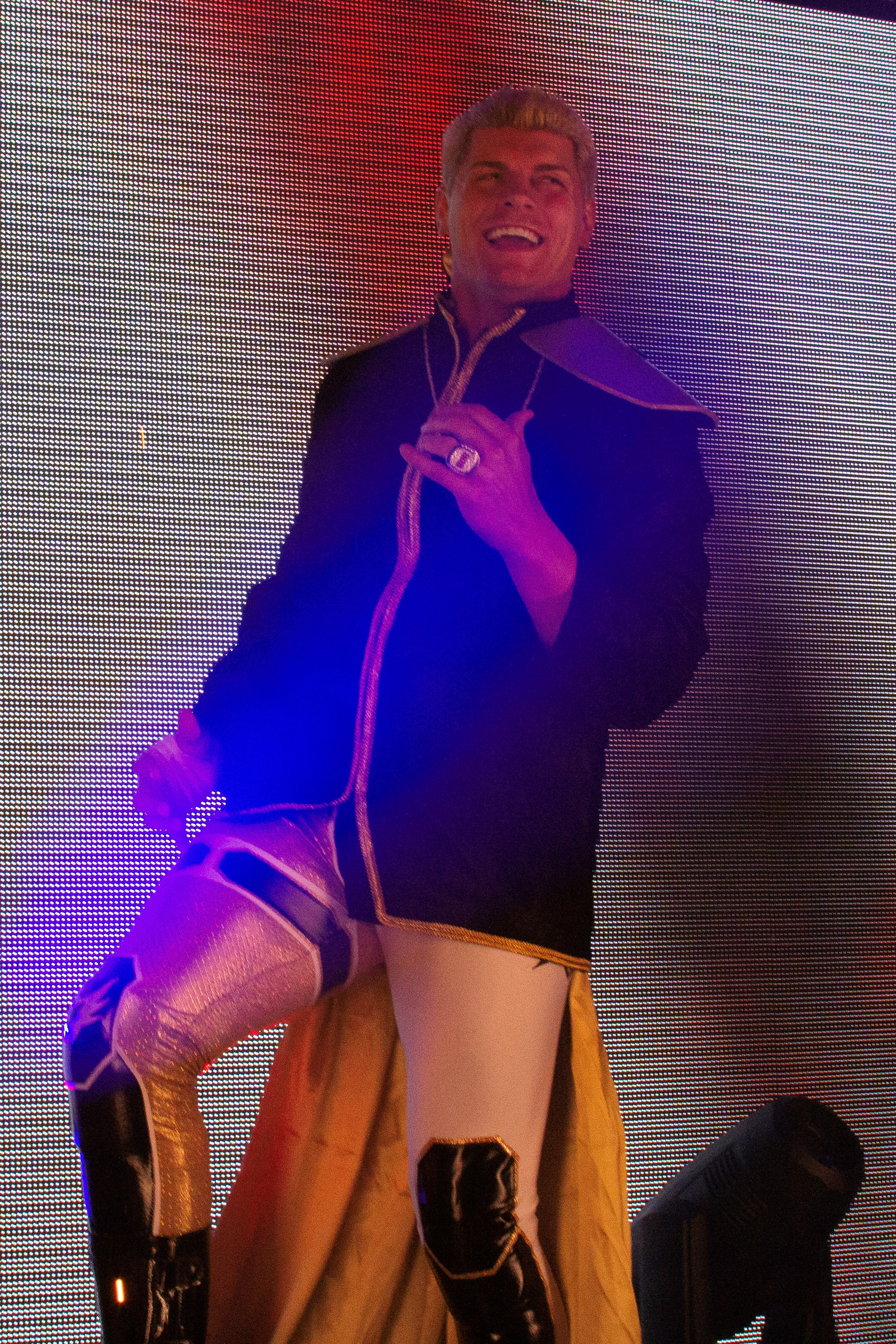
Cody Rhodes

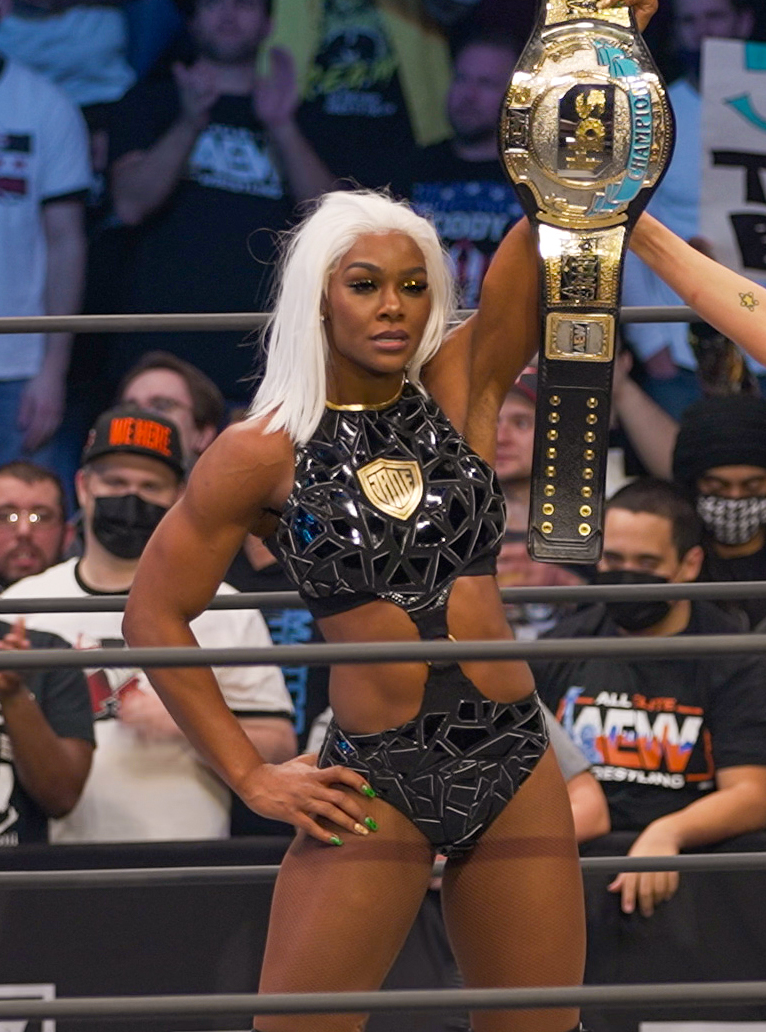
Jade Cargill

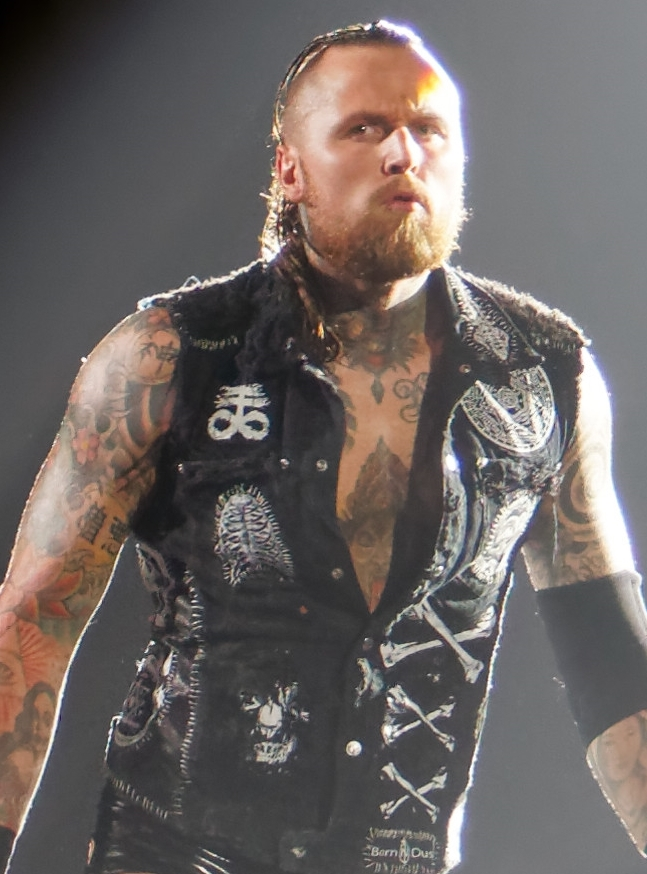
Malakai Black

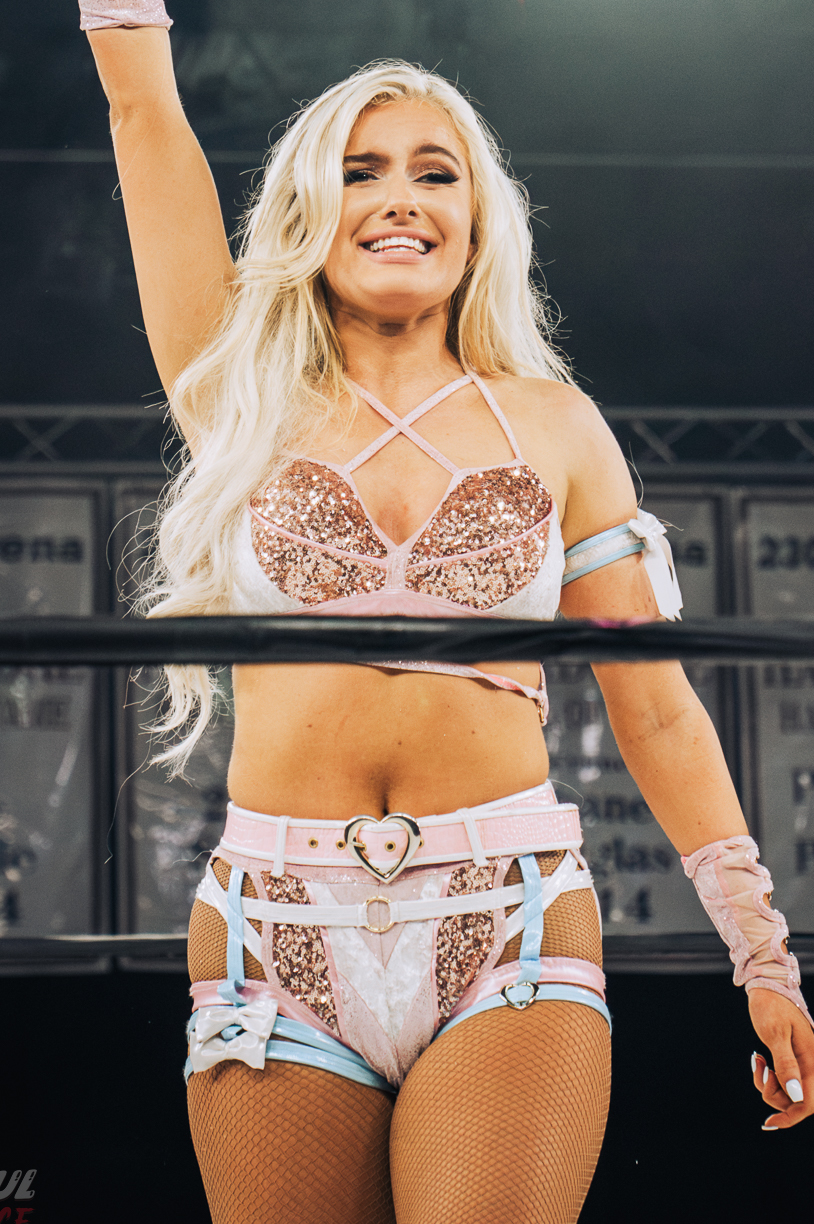
Mariah May

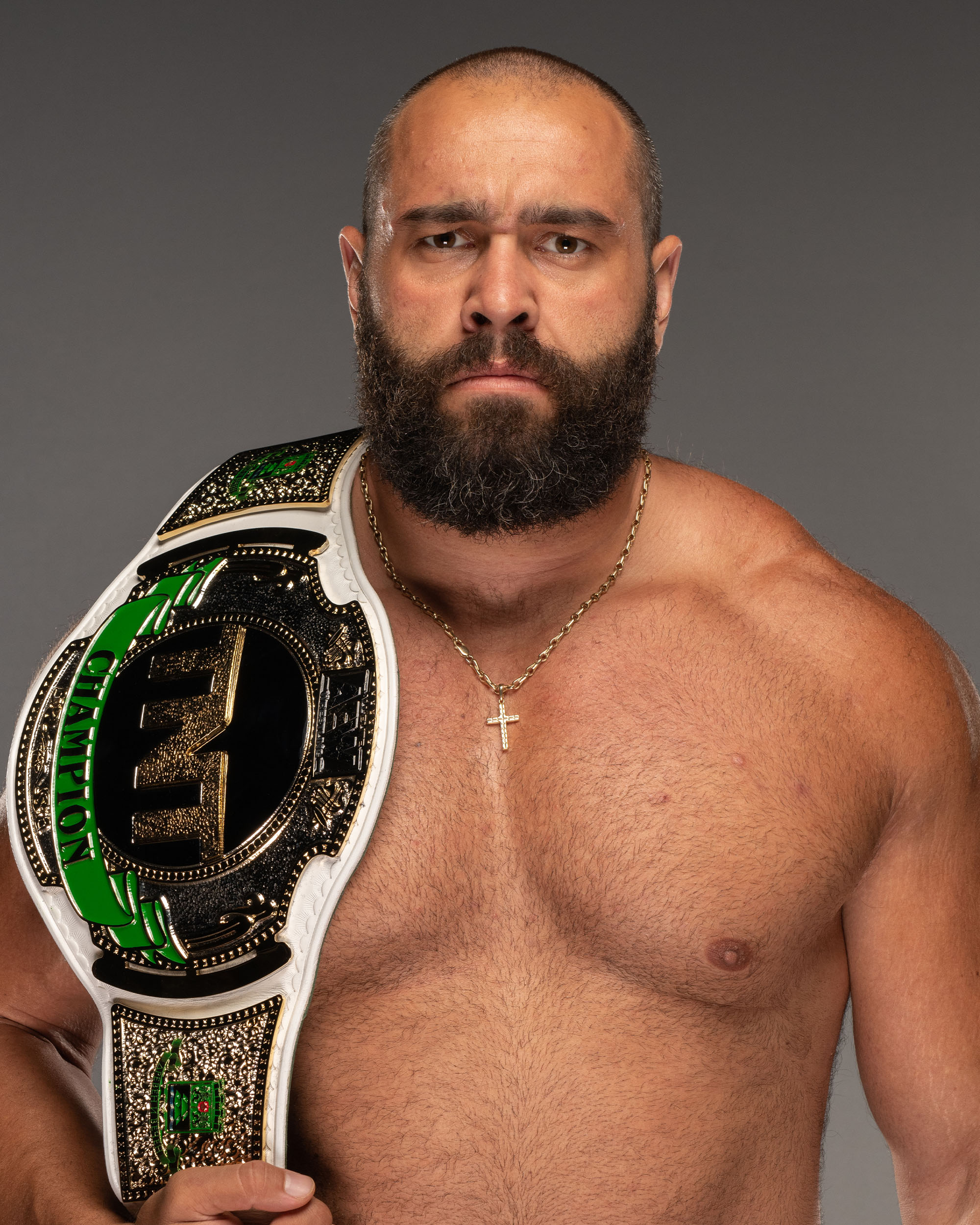
Miro

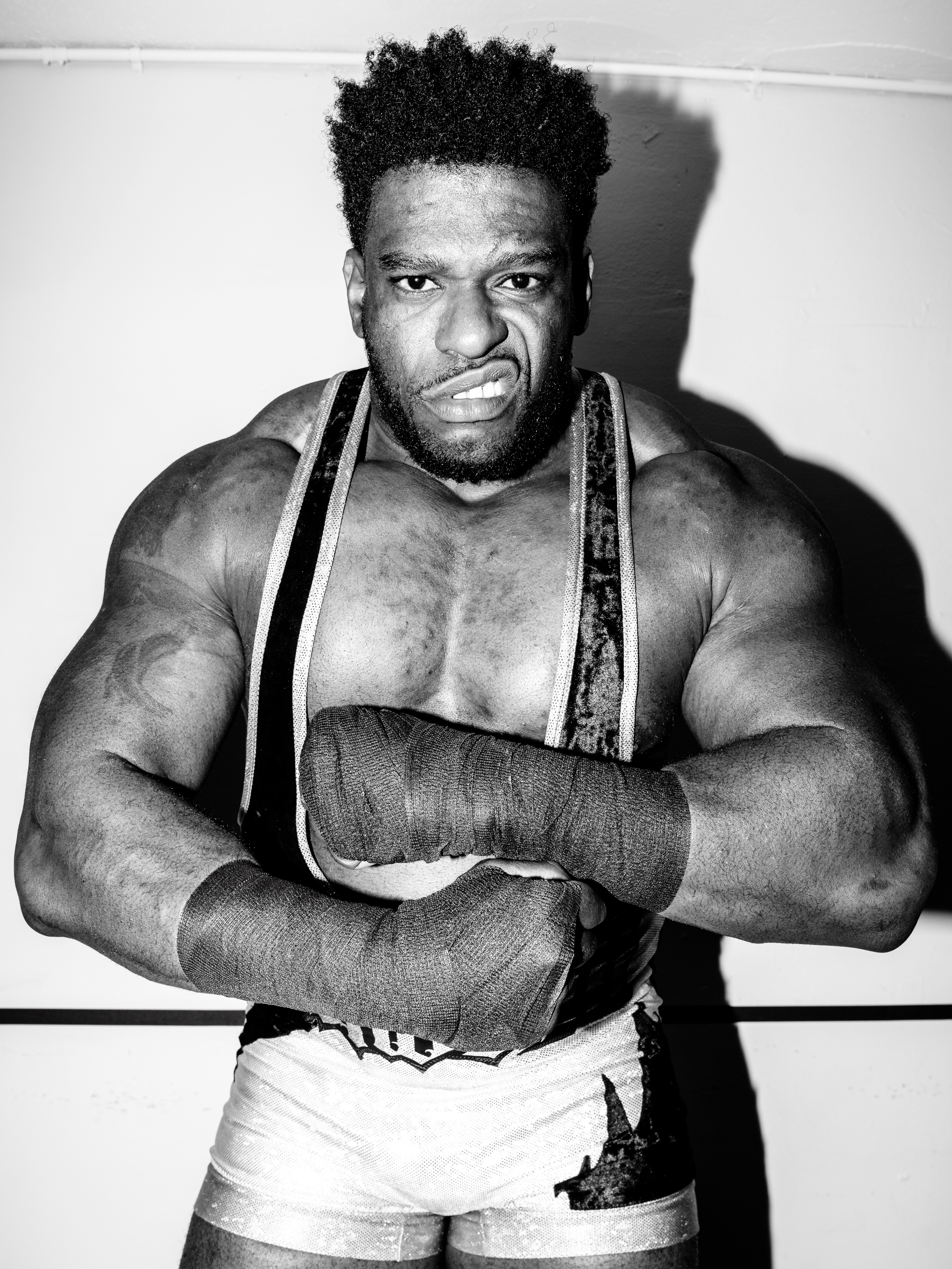
Powerhouse Hobbs

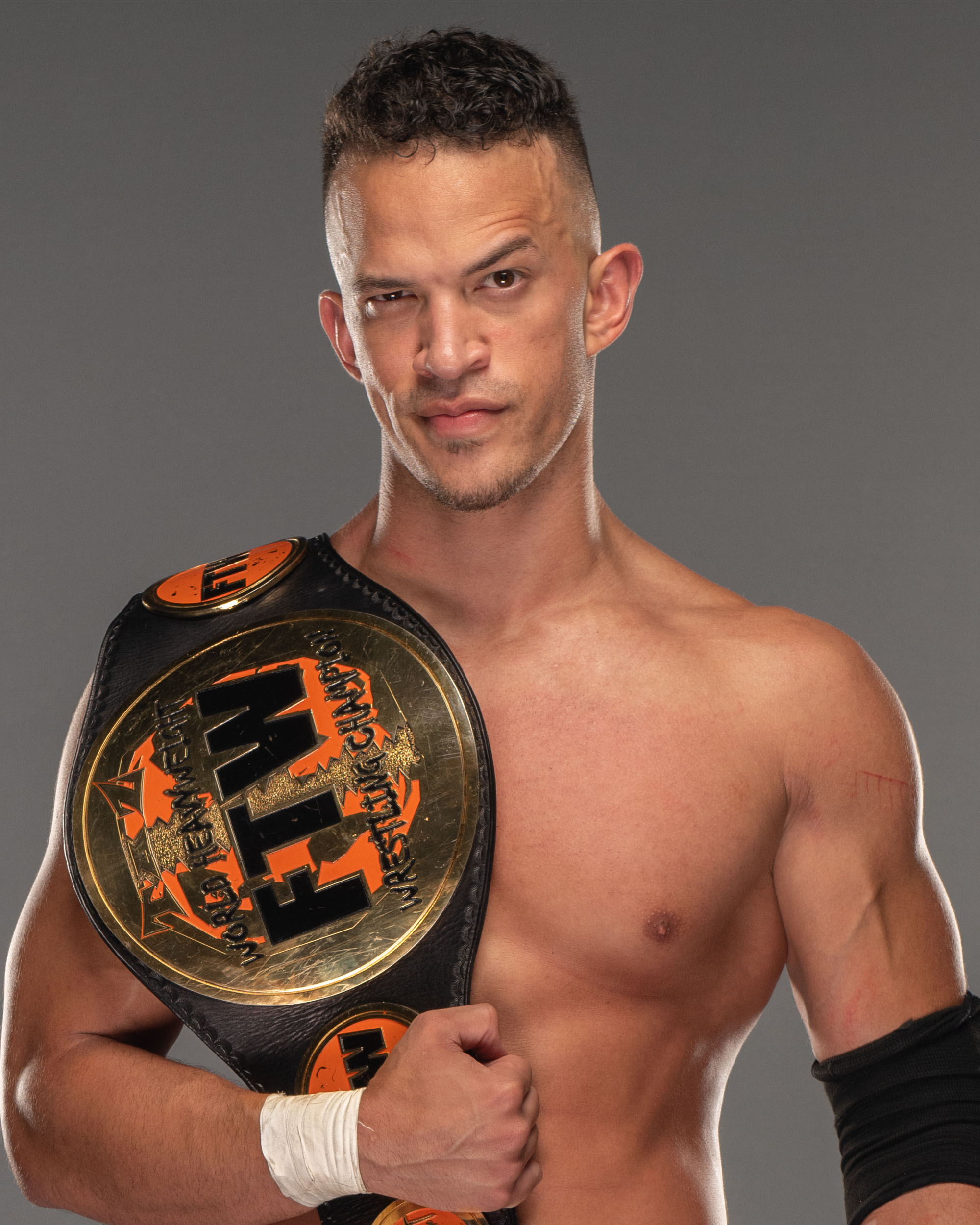
Ricky Starks

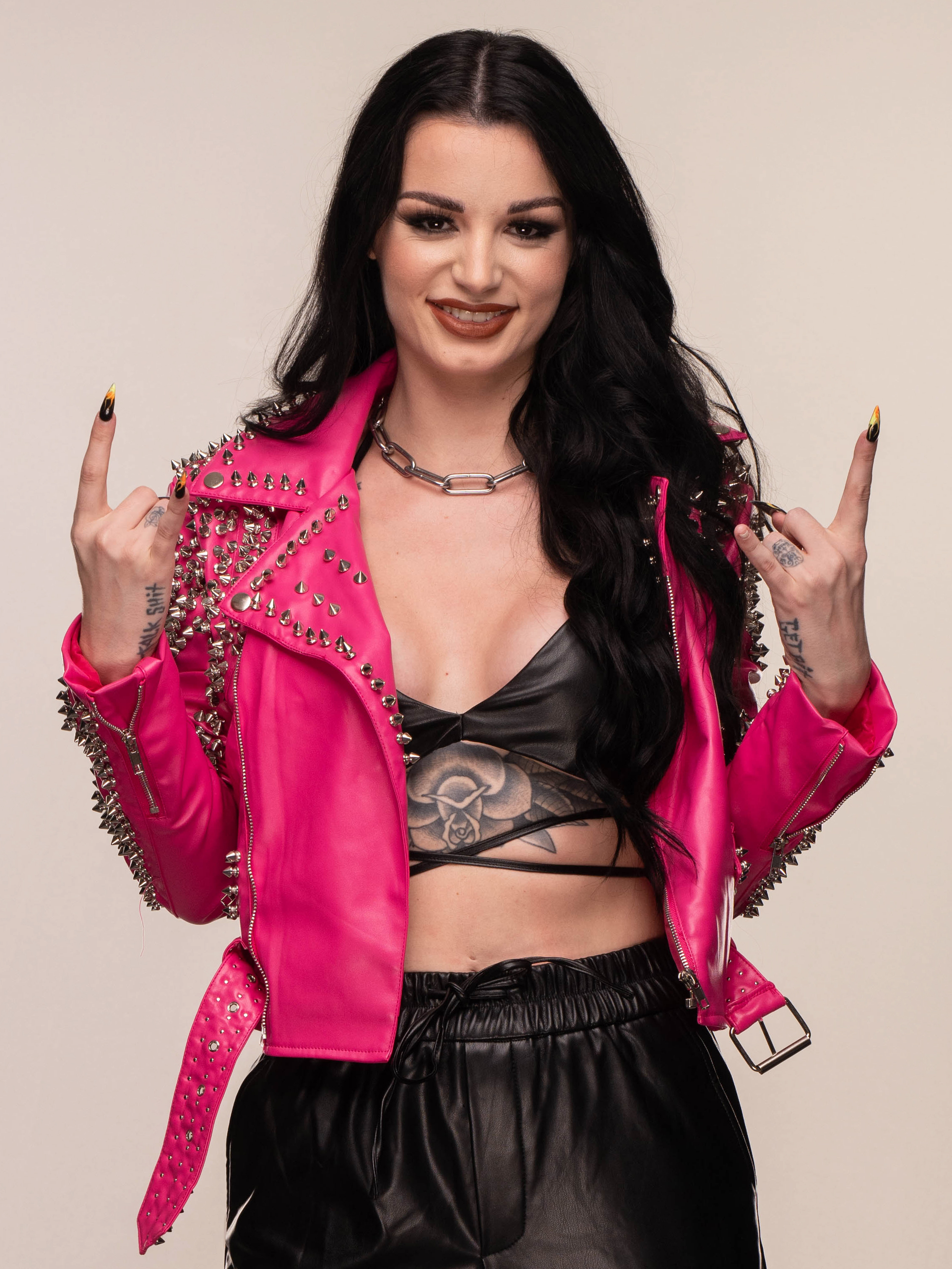
Saraya

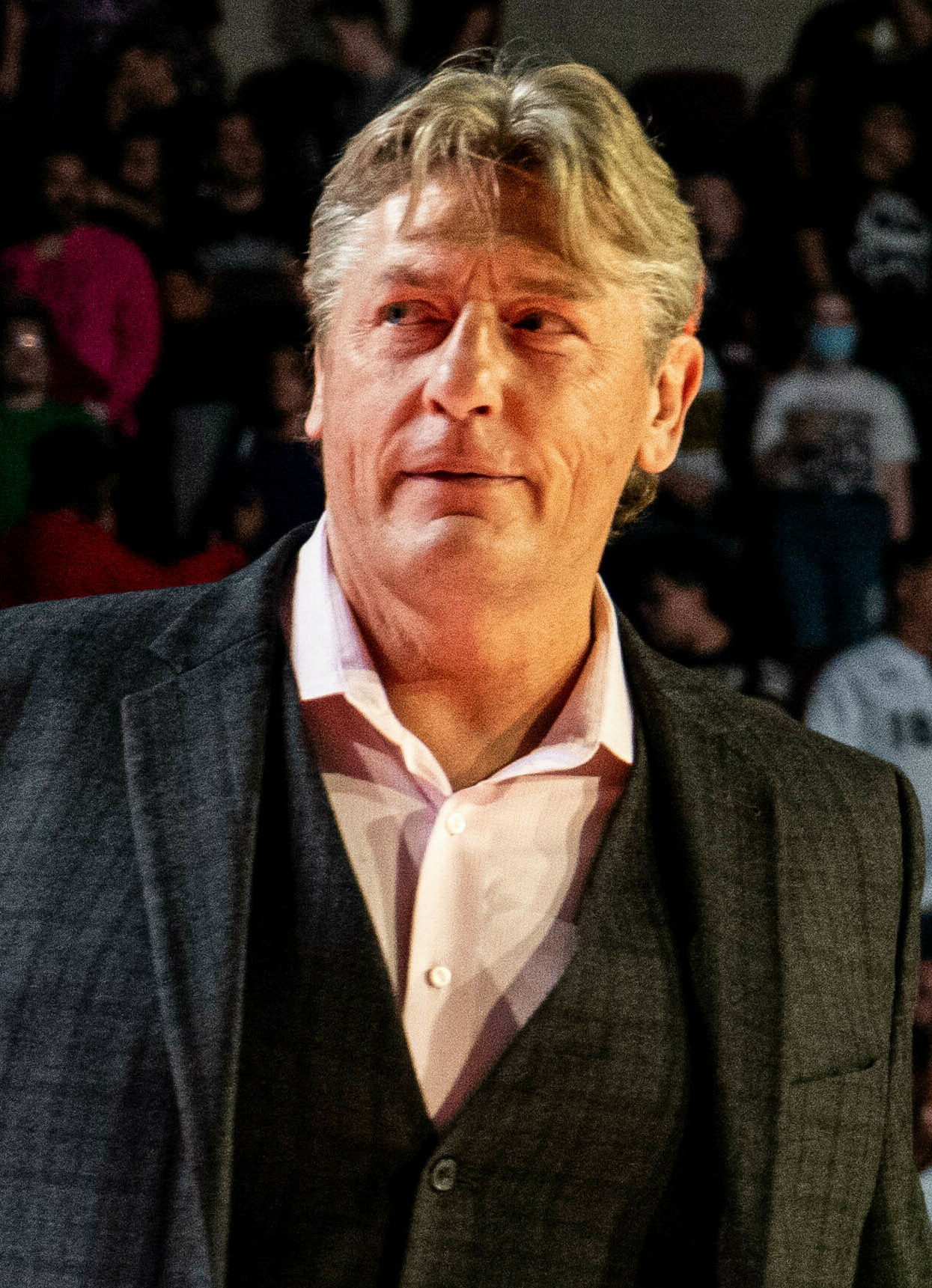
William Regal

†	Indicates the person is deceased
‡	Indicates the person died while contracted with AEW

Real name	Ring name(s)	Tenure	Ref.
Alex Abrahantes	Alex Abrahantes	2019–2026	
Ronnie Arneill	Shawn Spears	2019–2023	
Angela Arnold	AQA	2022	
Miroslav Barnyashev	Miro	2020–2025	
Alexandra Barrulas	Shanna	2019–2021	
Leva Bates	Leva Bates	2019–2023	
Jazmin Benitez	Mercedes Martinez	2021–2026	
Vickie Benson	Vickie Guerrero	2020–2023	
Saraya Bevis	Saraya	2022–2025	
Zak Bevis	Zak Knight	2023–2025	
Tully Blanchard	Tully Blanchard	2019–2022	
Cezar Bononi	Cezar Bononi	2020–2023	
Parker Boudreaux	Parker Boudreaux	2022–2024	
Anthony Bowens	Anthony Bowens	2020–2026	
Jeremy Boyd	Slim J	2022–2024	
Phillip Brooks	CM Punk	2021–2023	
Tom Büdgen	Malakai Black	2021–2025	
Matthew Burns	Nick Mondo	2019–2020	
Jade Cargill	Jade Cargill	2020–2023	
Zack Carpinello	Zack Clayton	2022–2023	
Wiliam Carr	Dutch	2023–2025	
Max Caster	Max Caster	2020–2026	
Donovan Danhausen	Danhausen	2022–2026	
Laura Dennis	Allie; The Bunny	2019–2023	
Marc Dionne	Stu Grayson	2019–2022; 2023–2024	
Robert Fish	Bobby Fish	2021–2022	
Joseph Fitz	Bear Bronson; Bronson; Bulk Bronson	2020–2025	
Kevin Foote	Kevin Kelly	2023–2024	
José García	José the Assistant	2021–2024	
Frank Gerdelman	Frankie Kazarian	2019–2023	
Sadie Gibbs	Sadie Gibbs	2019–2020	
Granden Goetzman	Trench	2022–2023	
Melanie Goranson	Mel	2019–2021	
Salvador Guerrero IV	Chavo Guerrero Jr.	2021–2022	
Taynara Melo Guevara	Tay Conti; Tay Melo	2020–2026	
Jesse Guilmette	The Blade	2019–2026	
Christopher Guy	Ace Steel	2022, 2023	
Donald Hager Jr.	Jake Hager	2019–2024	
Jeff Hardy	Jeff Hardy	2022–2024	
Matt Hardy	Matt Hardy	2020–2024	
Mark Henry	Mark Henry	2021–2024	
Leyla Hirsch	Leyla Hirsch	2020–2025	
William Hobson	Will Hobbs; Powerhouse Hobbs	2020–2026	
Kiera Hogan	Kiera Hogan	2021–2025	
Jonathan Huber ^{‡}	Mr. Brodie Lee	2020	
Aerial Hull	Big Swole	2019–2021	
Joseph Janela	Joey Janela	2019–2022	
Dasha Kuret	Dasha Gonzalez	2019–2024	
Brock Lunde	Brock Anderson	2021–2023	
Martin Lunde	Arn Anderson	2019–2024	
Kira Renée Magnin-Forster	Taya Valkyrie	2023–2026	
Matthew Marinelli	Matt Taven	2022–2026	
Vincent Marseglia	Vincent	2023–2025	
Darren Matthews	William Regal	2022	
James McAhren	Jimmy Havoc	2019–2020	
Trey McBrayer	Trey Miguel	2026	
Willie McClinton Jr.	Willie Mack	2023–2026	
Cole McKinney	Cole Karter	2022–2026	
Mariah Mead	Mariah May	2023–2025	
Alex Mendez	Goldenboy	2019–2020	
Julian Micevski	Ethan Page	2021–2024	
Jack Miller	Jack Evans	2019–2022	
William Morrissey	Big Bill	2022–2026	
E. J. Nduka	EJ Nduka	2023–2025	
Noah Nelms	Marko Stunt	2019–2022	
Ryan Nemeth	Ryan Nemeth	2021–2024	
KJ Orso	Fuego Del Sol	2021–2023	
Nobuhiko Oshima	Cima	2019–2020	
CJ Perry	CJ	2023–2024	
Brian Pillman	Brian Pillman Jr.	2020–2023	
Beatrice Priestley	Bea Priestley	2019–2020	
Brandi Runnels	Brandi Rhodes	2019–2022	
Cody Runnels	Cody; Cody Rhodes; Fuego 2	2019–2022	
Mark Sanchez	Mike Santana; Santana	2019–2024	
Benjamin Satterley ^{‡}	Pac	2019–2026	
Christopher Scoville	Jimmy Jacobs	2023–2024	
Harpreet Singh	Jora Johl	2021–2024	
Aurelian Smith Jr.	Jake Roberts	2019–2026	
Brianna Sparrey	Kylie Rae	2019	
Richard Starks	Ricky Starks	2020–2025	
Brittany Steding	Lady Frost	2023–2026	
Jennifer Sterger	Jennifer Decker	2019–2020	
Kia Stevens	Awesome Kong	2019–2021	
Brandon Tate	Brandon; Boy #2	2022–2024	
Brent Tate	Brent; Boy #1	2022–2024	
Sunny Aziza Tate	Sonny Kiss	2019–2023	
Trey Tucker	Alan Angels	2020–2022	
Willie Urbina	Willie Urbina	2019–2021	
Paige VanZant	Paige VanZant	2021–2022	
Ivelisse Vélez	Ivelisse	2019; 2020–2021	
Thomas Wansaw Jr.	Bear Boulder; Beefcake Boulder; Boulder	2020–2025	
Benjamin Whitmer	BJ Whitmer	2019–2023	
Andrew J. Williams ^{†}	The Butcher	2019–2026	
Unknown	Abadon	2020–2025	
Unknown	Gravity	2023–2024	
Unknown	Penta El Zero M Penta El Zero Miedo; Penta Oscuro; Pentagón Jr.	2019–2024	
Unknown	Rey Fénix	2019–2025	
