= GCW Collective =

Multi-day professional wrestling event

- Created by: Game Changer Wrestling
- Promotions: Game Changer Wrestling (2019-present); Black Label Pro (2019-2023); Absolute Intense Wrestling (2019-2020); Blackcraft Wrestling (2019); Chikara (2019); International Wrestling Syndicate (2019); DDT Pro-Wrestling (2023); Tokyo Joshi Pro Wrestling (2024-present); Glory Pro Wrestling (2020, 2022); Freelance Wrestling/Freelance Underground (2020); Shimmer Women Athletes (2020); Unsanctioned Pro (2021-2022); Violence x Suffering (2021); No Peace Underground (2021); Mission Pro Wrestling (2022); Paradigm Pro Wrestling (2022); DEFY Wrestling (2024-present); Progress Wrestling (2024-present); Dragongate/Dragon Gate USA (2025-present); WrestleCon (2025-present); WWE/WWE ID (2025); 4th Rope Wrestling (2025); PODER~! Wrestling (2026); New Japan Pro-Wrestling (2026); Pro Wrestling Unplugged (2026); Hybrid Wrestling (2026); Juggalo Championship Wrestling (2026)
- First event: 2019

The Collective is an annual series of professional wrestling shows organized by Game Changer Wrestling (GCW), first held in 2019, the first Collective consisted of shows from GCW and various independent wrestling promotions such as Interspecies Wrestling (ISW), Absolute Intense Wrestling (AIW), Black Label Pro (BLP), Chikara, Blackcraft Wrestling, and International Wrestling Syndicate, and were aired on FITE TV and IndependentWrestling.tv. The event also featured the second Bloodsport. The series has taken place during WrestleMania weekend since its inception except in 2020 in the wake of the COVID-19 pandemic where the Collective was rescheduled in October.

On January 7, 2025, it was announced that the WrestleCon Mark Hitchcock Memorial Supershow would be held at the Collective on April 17, 2025 for the first time at the Palms Casino Resort in Las Vegas, Nevada. Simulcasting on Triller TV and Highspots TV, the show would also feature the GCW debut of former heavyweight boxer and television personality Butterbean who would fight Minoru Suzuki.

On January 31, 2025, Dragongate announced the return of Dragon Gate USA with a pay-per-view event titled The Rebirth which was initially set to be held at the Moon & View but was moved to the Pearl Theater. The show aired live as a pay-per-view event on Triller TV with the main event being a six man tag team match between Paradox (Dragon Kid, Susumu Yokosuka, and Yamato) and the Z-Brats (Ishin, Kota Minoura, and Shun Skywalker).

On April 18, 2025, Sabu's retirement match took place during Joey Janela's Spring Break 9 at the Collective in a no ropes barbed wire match against Joey Janela in which he got the victory, three months before his passing. However, GCW would come under scrutiny after Janela had revealed in an interview that Sabu was given kratom despite his physical condition at the time. GCW has since denied any involvement in Sabu's death.

On October 23, 2025, it was announced that GCW and WrestleCon would join forces to hold both the WrestleCon convention and the Collective at Horseshoe Las Vegas in Paradise, Nevada.

On February 1, 2026, GCW announced that The Sandman would have his final match at the Collective during Joey Janela's Spring Break X. On February 10, 2026, Sandman's opponent was announced to be the "Invisible Man, an opponent which Sandman had personally requested.

== Events ==
=== 2019 ===
| Date | Event name | Promotion | Venue | Location | Main event | Notes | Ref |
|---|---|---|---|---|---|---|---|
| April 4 | Family Reunion | IWTV | White Eagle Hall | Jersey City, New Jersey | Gary Jay vs. Jake Parnell in a last man standing match | | |
| April 4 | Josh Barnett's Bloodsport | GCW | White Eagle Hall | Jersey City, New Jersey | Josh Barnett vs. Minoru Suzuki | | |
| April 4 | Boner Jam IV: Balls Out | ISW | White Eagle Hall | Jersey City, New Jersey | Addy Starr (c) vs. Nick Gage vs. Matt Tremont vs. Jeff Cannonball in a four way Lego death match for the ISW Undisputed King of Crazy Championship | | |
| April 4 | The Slumber Party Massacre | AIW | White Eagle Hall | Jersey City, New Jersey | PB Smooth (c) vs. Tim Donst vs. Matthew Justice vs. Tom Lawlor in a four way match for the AIW Absolute Championship | | |
| April 5 | Once Upon A Beginning | Chikara | White Eagle Hall | Jersey City, New Jersey | Dasher Hatfield (c) vs. Mark Angelosetti for the Chikara Grand Championship | | |
| April 5 | Adventures In Wrestling | BLP | White Eagle Hall | Jersey City, New Jersey | Jonathan Gresham vs. Shigehiro Irie | | |
| April 5 | Joey Janela's Spring Break 3 Part 1 | GCW | White Eagle Hall | Jersey City, New Jersey | Masashi Takeda vs. Jimmy Lloyd in a death match | | |
| April 5 | No Apologies | Blackcraft | White Eagle Hall | Jersey City, New Jersey | Baphomet battle royal | | |
| April 6 | Orange Cassidy Is Doing Something Or Whatever Who Knows??? | GCW | White Eagle Hall | Jersey City, New Jersey | Nick Gage vs. UltraMantis Black in a non-title yuletide death match | | |
| April 6 | Unstoppable | IWS | White Eagle Hall | Jersey City, New Jersey | Arik Cannon vs. Sexxxy Eddy in an alcobrawl match | | |
| April 6 | Joey Janela's Spring Break 3 Part 2 | GCW | White Eagle Hall | Jersey City, New Jersey | Clusterf**k battle royal | | |
(c) – refers to the champion(s) heading into the match

=== 2020 ===
| Date | Event name | Promotion | Venue | Location | Main event | Notes | Ref |
|---|---|---|---|---|---|---|---|
| October 9 | Jimmy Lloyd’s D-Generation F | GCW | Marion County Fairgrounds Coliseum | Indianapolis, Indiana | Colby Corino vs. Atticus Cogar in a death match | | |
| October 9 | Swing of the Axe | SUP | Marion County Fairgrounds Coliseum | Indianapolis, Indiana | AC Mack (c) vs. AJ Gray for the SUP Bonestorm Championship | | |
| October 9 | Thunder In Indianapolis | AIW | Marion County Fairgrounds Coliseum | Indianapolis, Indiana | Matthew Justice (c) vs. Joshua Bishop in a no ropes barbed wire match for the AIW Absolute Championship and the AIW Intense Championship | | |
| October 9 | For The Culture | GCW | Marion County Fairgrounds Coliseum | Indianapolis, Indiana | 2 Cold Scorpio vs. AR Fox | | |
| October 10 | Effy's Big Gay Brunch 3 | GCW | Marion County Fairgrounds Coliseum | Indianapolis, Indiana | Cassandro el Exotico vs. Sonny Kiss | | |
| October 10 | Are Ya Wrestling, Son? | Glory Pro | Marion County Fairgrounds Coliseum | Indianapolis, Indiana | AJ Gray (c) vs. ACH for the Crown of Glory Championship | | |
| October 10 | Joey Janela’s Spring Break 4 | GCW | Marion County Fairgrounds Coliseum | Indianapolis, Indiana | Alex Colon vs. Matt Tremont in a death match | | |
| October 10 | I Don't Think We're In Chicago Anymore | Freelance Wrestling; Freelance Underground | Marion County Fairgrounds Coliseum | Indianapolis, Indiana | Kylie Rae (c) vs. Josh Alexander for the Freelance World Championship | | |
| October 11 | Threat Level Noon | BLP | Marion County Fairgrounds Coliseum | Indianapolis, Indiana | Jake Something (c) vs. Warhorse for the BLP Heavyweight Championship | | |
| October 11 | SHIMMER Volume 118 | Shimmer | Marion County Fairgrounds Coliseum | Indianapolis, Indiana | Kimber Lee (c) vs. Nicole Savoy for the SHIMMER Championship | | |
| October 11 | Josh Barnett's Bloodsport 3 | GCW | Marion County Fairgrounds Coliseum | Indianapolis, Indiana | Jon Moxley vs. Chris Dickinson | | |
| October 11 | Trapsoul | PPW | Marion County Fairgrounds Coliseum | Indianapolis, Indiana | Matthew Justice vs. Bradley Prescott IV in a Clockwork Orange House of Fun death match | | |
(c) – refers to the champion(s) heading into the match

=== 2021 ===
| Date | Event name | Promotion | Venue | Location | Main event | Notes | Ref |
|---|---|---|---|---|---|---|---|
| April 8 | Jimmy Lloyd's D-Generation F | GCW | Cuban Club | Ybor City, Florida | Jimmy Lloyd vs. Starboy Charlie | | |
| April 8 | Acid Cup 3 | GCW | Cuban Club | Ybor City, Florida | Nate Webb vs. AJ Gray in an Acid Cup first round match | | |
| April 8 | Josh Barnett’s Bloodsport 6 | GCW | Cuban Club | Ybor City, Florida | Josh Barnett vs. Jon Moxley | | |
| April 8 | For The Culture | GCW | Cuban Club | Ybor City, Florida | 2 Cold Scorpio vs. Rich Swann | | |
| April 9 | Allie Kat's Real Hot Girl Sh*t | GCW | Cuban Club | Ybor City, Florida | Faye Jackson's grey sweatpants battle royal | | |
| April 9 | Acid Cup 3 | GCW | Cuban Club | Ybor City, Florida | Jordan Oliver vs. Lee Moriarty in an Acid Cup finals match | | |
| April 9 | rSpring Break presented by 44OH! | GCW | Cuban Club | Ybor City, Florida | Rickey Shane Page (c) vs. Nick Gage in a deathmatch for the GCW World Championship | | |
| April 9 | Lucid Dreams | VxS | Cuban Club | Ybor City, Florida | Low Ki vs. Lio Rush | | |
| April 10 | Effy’s Big Gay Brunch | GCW | Cuban Club | Ybor City, Florida | AJ Gray vs. Billy Dixon in a pup collar match | | |
| April 10 | Planet Death | GCW | Cuban Club | Ybor City, Florida | Lucky 13 vs. Alex Colon for the vacant GCW Ultraviolent Championship | | |
| April 10 | Unsanctioned Pro 11: Fueled By Spite | Unsanctioned Pro | Cuban Club | Ybor City, Florida | Everett Cross (c) vs. G-Raver for the Unsanctioned Pro Heavyweight Championship | | |
| April 10 | Shallow Graves | NPU | Cuban Club | Ybor City, Florida | MASADA vs. Alex Colon | | |
(c) – refers to the champion(s) heading into the match

=== 2022 ===
| Date | Event name | Promotion | Venue | Location | Main event | Notes | Ref |
|---|---|---|---|---|---|---|---|
| March 31 | Glory Pro Cemetery Gates | Glory Pro | Fair Park | Dallas, Texas | Mike Outlaw (c) vs. Bryan Keith for the Crown of Glory Championship | | |
| March 31 | Josh Barnett’s Bloodsport 8 | GCW | Fair Park | Dallas, Texas | Chris Dickinson vs. Minoru Suzuki | | |
| March 31 | Joey Janela's Spring Break 6 Part 1 | GCW | Fair Park | Dallas, Texas | Alex Colon (c) vs. John Wayne Murdoch for the GCW Ultraviolent Championship | | |
| March 31 | Planet Death | GCW | Fair Park | Dallas, Texas | Sadika vs. Jimmy Lloyd in a barbed wire doors death match | | |
| April 1 | LA Fights vs. JCW | GCW | Fair Park | Dallas, Texas | Dark Sheik vs. Charles Mason | | |
| April 1 | For The Culture | GCW | Fair Park | Dallas, Texas | Hoodfoot vs. Billy Dixon in a death match | | |
| April 1 | Gringo Loco's The Wrld On Lucha | GCW | Fair Park | Dallas, Texas | Dr. Wagner Jr. vs. Psycho Clown | | |
| April 1 | Joey Janela's Spring Break 6 Part 2: The Greatest Clusterf**k | GCW | Fair Park | Dallas, Texas | Clusterf**k battle royal | | |
| April 2 | Effy's Big Gay Brunch | GCW | Fair Park | Dallas, Texas | Pimpinela Escarlata vs. Effy | | |
| April 2 | Bangerz Only | MPW | Fair Park | Dallas, Texas | Holidead (c) vs. LuFisto in a no disqualification match for the MPW Championship | | |
| April 2 | Unsanctioned Pro 18: Mulligan | Unsanctioned Pro | Fair Park | Dallas, Texas | Casanova Valentine vs. Hoodfoot in a death match | | |
| April 2 | BLP Norm | BLP | Fair Park | Dallas, Texas | Big Beef vs. Levi Everett in a Texas death match | | |
(c) – refers to the champion(s) heading into the match

=== 2023 ===
| Date | Event name | Promotion | Venue | Location | Main event | Notes | Ref |
|---|---|---|---|---|---|---|---|
| March 30 | California Love | SBW | Ukrainian Cultural Center | Los Angeles, California | Che Cabrera (c) vs. Willie Mack for the SBW Championship | | |
| March 30 | DDT Goes Hollywood | DDT | Ukrainian Cultural Center | Los Angeles, California | Konosuke Takeshita vs. Yuki Ueno | | |
| March 30 | Josh Barnett’s Bloodsport 9 | GCW | Ukrainian Cultural Center | Los Angeles, California | Timothy Thatcher vs. Josh Barnett | | |
| March 30 | For The Culture | GCW | Ukrainian Cultural Center | Los Angeles, California | Trish Adora (c) vs. Calvin Tankman for the Pan-Afrikan World Diaspora Wrestling World Championship | | |
| March 31 | Jimmy Lloyd’s Degeneration-F | GCW | Ukrainian Cultural Center | Los Angeles, California | The Bang Bros (August Matthews and Davey Bang) vs. BestBros (Baliyan Akki and Mei Suruga) vs. Wasted Youth (Dyln McKay and Marcus Mathers) vs. CPF (Danny Black and Joe Lando) in a four way tag team match | | |
| March 31 | GCW vs. DDT | GCW; DDT | Ukrainian Cultural Center | Los Angeles, California | Cole Radrick (c) vs. Yoshihiko for the DDT Ironman Heavymetalweight Championship | | |
| March 31 | Joey Janela’s Spring Break 7 | GCW | Ukrainian Cultural Center | Los Angeles, California | Kota Ibushi vs. Joey Janela | | |
| March 31 | Emo Fight | GCW | Ukrainian Cultural Center | Los Angeles, California | Moonlight Express (MAO and Mike Bailey) vs. Los Macizos (Ciclope and Miedo Extremo) vs. Wasted Youth (Dyln McKay and Marcus Mathers) in a three way tag team match | | |
| April 1 | Effy’s Big Gay Brunch 6 | GCW | Ukrainian Cultural Center | Los Angeles, California | Thrussy (Allie Katch, Dark Sheik, and Effy) vs. Mason's Mercenaries (Billy Dixon, Charles Mason, and Parrow) in a mixed six person tag team match | | |
| April 1 | Gringo Loco’s The WRLD on Lucha | GCW | Ukrainian Cultural Center | Los Angeles, California | Laredo Kid vs. El Hijo del Vikingo | | |
(c) – refers to the champion(s) heading into the match

=== 2024 ===
| Date | Event name | Promotion | Venue | Location | Main event | Notes | Ref |
|---|---|---|---|---|---|---|---|
| April 4 | Can't Deny It | DEFY | Penns Landing Caterers | Philadelphia, Pennsylvania | KENTA (c) vs. Gringo Loco for the DEFY World Championship | | |
| April 4 | Josh Barnett's Bloodsport X | GCW | Penns Landing Caterers | Philadelphia, Pennsylvania | Josh Barnett vs. Johnny Bloodsport | | |
| April 4 | DDT Goes Philadelphia | DDT | Penns Landing Caterers | Philadelphia, Pennsylvania | Mike Bailey vs. Yuki Ueno in a non title match | | |
| April 4 | GCW/JCW vs. The World | GCW | Penns Landing Caterers | Philadelphia, Pennsylvania | Mao and Yoshihiko vs. Norman Harras and Robert Dreissker vs. Boisterous Behaviour (Leon Slater and Man Like DeReiss) vs. Los Macizos (Ciclope and Miedo Extremo) | | |
| April 5 | TJPW Live In Philly | TJPW | Penns Landing Caterers | Philadelphia, Pennsylvania | Maki Itoh and Miyu Yamashita vs. Miu Watanabe and Rika Tatsumi | | |
| April 5 | Progress Chapter 166: Freedom Walks Again | Progress | Penns Landing Caterers | Philadelphia, Pennsylvania | Kid Lykos (c) vs. Man Like DeReiss for the Progress World Championship | | |
| April 5 | Joey Janela's Spring Break 8 | GCW | Penns Landing Caterers | Philadelphia, Pennsylvania | Blake Christian (c) vs. Joey Janela for the GCW World Championship | | |
| April 5 | For The Culture | GCW | Penns Landing Caterers | Philadelphia, Pennsylvania | Darius Carter vs. Billy Dixon with special guest referee Darius Lockhart | | |
| April 6 | Effy's Big Gay Brunch 9 | GCW | Penns Landing Caterers | Philadelphia, Pennsylvania | Dark Sheik vs. Sonny Kiss | | |
| April 6 | GCW vs. TJPW | GCW; TJPW | Penns Landing Caterers | Philadelphia, Pennsylvania | Miyu Yamashita, Shoko Nakajima, and Yuki Aino vs. Maki Itoh, Masha Slamovich, and Rina Yamashita in a six woman tag team match | | |
| April 6 | Joey Janela's Spring Break: Clusterf**k Forever | GCW | Penns Landing Caterers | Philadelphia, Pennsylvania | Clusterf**k battle royal | | |
(c) – refers to the champion(s) heading into the match

=== 2025 ===
| Date | Event name | Promotion | Venue | Location | Main event | Notes | Ref |
|---|---|---|---|---|---|---|---|
| April 16 | ID Championship Tournament | GCW; WWE ID | Palms Casino Resort | Las Vegas, Nevada | Jackson Drake and Swipe Right (Brad Baylor and Ricky Smokes) vs. Cappuccino Jones, Jack Cartwheel, and Sean Legacy in a six man tag team match | | |
| April 16 | The Rebirth | Dragon Gate USA; Dragongate | Palms Casino Resort | Las Vegas, Nevada | Paradox (Dragon Kid, Susumu Yokosuka, and Yamato) vs. Z-Brats (Ishin, Kota Minoura, and Shun Skywalker) in a six man tag team match | | |
| April 17 | DEFY Living Proof | DEFY | Palms Casino Resort | Las Vegas, Nevada | Clark Connors (c) vs. El Phantasmo vs. Man Like DeReiss in a three way match for the DEFY World Championship | | |
| April 17 | Mark Hitchcock Memorial SuperShow | WrestleCon | Palms Casino Resort | Las Vegas, Nevada | Flip Gordon, Hechicero, and Michael Oku vs. TMDK (Bad Dude Tito, Shane Haste, and Zack Sabre Jr.) in a six man tag team match | | |
| April 17 | Josh Barnett's Bloodsport XIII | GCW | Palms Casino Resort | Las Vegas, Nevada | Josh Barnett vs. Gabe Kidd | | |
| April 17 | Progress Chapter 179: Progress Las Vegas | Progress | Palms Casino Resort | Las Vegas, Nevada | Luke Jacobs (c) vs. Michael Oku for the PROGRESS World Championship | | |
| April 18 | TJPW Live In Las Vegas | TJPW | Palms Casino Resort | Las Vegas, Nevada | Mizuki (c) vs. Miyu Yamashita for the Princess of Princess Championship | | |
| April 18 | DDT Goes Las Vegas | DDT | Palms Casino Resort | Las Vegas, Nevada | Konosuke Takeshita vs. Mao | | |
| April 18 | Joey Janela's Spring Break 9 | GCW | Palms Casino Resort | Las Vegas, Nevada | Sabu vs. Joey Janela in a No Rope Barbed Wire match | This was the final match for Sabu before his passing | |
| April 18 | Heels Have Eyes VI: For The Culture | GCW; 4th Rope | Palms Casino Resort | Las Vegas, Nevada | Zilla Fatu (c) vs. Josh Bishop for the 4th Rope Championship | | |
| April 19 | Effy's Big Gay Brunch 10 | GCW | Palms Casino Resort | Las Vegas, Nevada | Effy (c) vs. Dark Sheik for the GCW World Championship | | |
| April 19 | TJPW vs. DDT vs. GCW | GCW; DDT; TJPW | Palms Casino Resort | Las Vegas, Nevada | Mao and Yoshihiko (c) vs. Alec Price and Jimmy Lloyd vs. Jack Cartwheel and Kazuma Sumi in a three way match for the BZW Tag Team Championship | | |
| April 19 | Joey Janela's Spring Break: Clusterf**k Forever | GCW | Palms Casino Resort | Las Vegas, Nevada | Clusterf**k battle royal | | |
(c) – refers to the champion(s) heading into the match

=== 2026 ===
| Date | Event name | Promotion | Venue | Location | Main event | Notes | Ref |
|---|---|---|---|---|---|---|---|
| April 15 | PoderMania~! | PODER~! | Horseshoe Las Vegas | Paradise, Nevada | Billie Starkz vs. Charli Evans | | |
| April 15 | The Gate of Sin City | Dragon Gate USA; Dragongate | Horseshoe Las Vegas | Paradise, Nevada | Dragon Kid, Kzy, and Yuki Yoshioka vs. Gajadokuro (ISHIN, Madoka Kikuta, and Yoshiki Kato) in a six man tag team match | | |
| April 15 | Midnight Xpress | Hybrid; PWU | Horseshoe Las Vegas | Paradise, Nevada | Pat Dynamite (c) vs. Jack Evans for the PWU World Championship | | |
| April 16 | Progress Chapter 193: Progress Las Vegas II | Progress | Horseshoe Las Vegas | Paradise, Nevada | Man Like DeReiss (c) vs. Michael Oku for the PROGRESS World Championship | | |
| April 16 | Mark Hitchcock Memorial Supershow | WrestleCon | Horseshoe Las Vegas | Paradise, Nevada | Gates of Agony (Bishop Kaun and Toa Liona) and Ricochet vs. JetSpeed (Kevin Knight and Mike Bailey) and Michael Oku in a six man tag team match | | |
| April 16 | Death Vegas Invitational | NJPW | Horseshoe Las Vegas | Paradise, Nevada | The H8 Club (Nick Gage and Matt Tremont) vs. Masashi Takeda and Rina Yamashita vs. El Desperado and Jun Kasai in a three way tag team match | Will be simulcasted on NJPW World | |
| April 16 | MDK Fight Club | GCW | Horseshoe Las Vegas | Paradise, Nevada | Bear Bronson and Mr. Danger vs. Hayabusa and Masato Tanaka | | |
| April 17 | Gringo Loco's The Wrld on Lucha | GCW | Horseshoe Las Vegas | Paradise, Nevada | El Desperado vs. Vipress | | |
| April 17 | Josh Barnett's Bloodsport XV | GCW | Horseshoe Las Vegas | Paradise, Nevada | Yuji Nagata vs. Josh Barnett | This would be the last Bloodsport event | |
| April 17 | Joey Janela's Spring Break X | GCW | Horseshoe Las Vegas | Paradise, Nevada | Joey Janela vs. Brodie Lee Jr. | | |
| April 17 | Strangle-Mania: Viva Las Violence | JCW | Horseshoe Las Vegas | Paradise, Nevada | Vampiro vs. PCO vs. Big Vito in a three way match | | |
| April 18 | Effy's Big Gay Brunch 11 | GCW | Horseshoe Las Vegas | Paradise, Nevada | Dark Sheik vs. Nyla Rose | | |
| April 18 | Joey Janela's Spring Break: The Immortal Clusterf**k | GCW | Horseshoe Las Vegas | Paradise, Nevada | Clusterf**k battle royal | | |
(c) – refers to the champion(s) heading into the match
