= Joey Janela's Spring Break =

Game Changer Wrestling event series

- Promotional poster for the inaugural event, featuring Joey Janela and Marty Jannetty
- Promotions: Game Changer Wrestling
- First event: Joey Janela's Spring Break (2017)
- Last event: Joey Janela's Spring Break: Clusterfuck Forever 2025

Joey Janela's Spring Break is a professional wrestling event held by the American promotion Game Changer Wrestling (GCW). This event is traditionally held annually with appearances from top independent talent, retired wrestlers, and the event's namesake, Joey Janela.

The first event took place in March 2017 in Florida and it found annual success due to its proximity to WWE's WrestleMania. This event is now part of GCW's "The Collective", which is a week long series of wrestling events including GCW's Bloodsport and Effy's Big Gay Brunch, as well as events from other promotions including Shimmer and Freelance Wrestling.

The signature match of Joey Janela's Spring Break is the "Clusterfuck Battle Royal". This match is similar to a traditional professional wrestling Battle Royal, however it differs in that competitors are eliminated by pinfall, submission, being sent over the top rope, leaving the building, or "death". Regular competitors in the Clusterfuck Battle Royal are previously retired wrestlers, independent talent, and comedic gimmicks. This Battle Royal, along with the event itself, is known for its abundance of highspots, comedic wrestling, and campiness. Throughout this event it is not uncommon for wrestlers and referees to ignore the traditional professional wrestling rule set (i.e., interference, foreign objects, countouts).

== Dates and venues ==
Event	Date	Location	Venue
Joey Janela's Spring Break	March 30, 2017	Fern Park, Florida	Orlando Live Events Center
Joey Janela's Spring Break 2	April 6, 2018	Kenner, Louisiana	Pontchartrain Convention & Civic Center
Joey Janela's Spring Break 3 Part 1	April 5, 2019	Jersey City, New Jersey	White Eagle Hall
Joey Janela's Spring Break 3 Part 2	April 7, 2019	Jersey City, New Jersey	White Eagle Hall
Joey Janela's Spring Break 4	October 10, 2020	Indianapolis, Indiana	Marion County Fairgrounds
rSpring Break presented by 44OH!	April 9, 2021	Ybor City, Florida	Cuban Club
Joey Janela's Spring Break 6 Part 1	March 31, 2022	Dallas, Texas	Fair Park
Joey Janela's Spring Break 6 Part 2	April 1, 2022	Dallas, Texas	Fair Park
Joey Janela's Spring Break 7	March 31, 2023	Los Angeles, California	Ukrainian Culture Center
Joey Janela's Spring Break 8	April 5, 2024	Philadelphia, Pennsylvania	Penns Landing Caterers
Joey Janela's Spring Break: Clusterfuck Forever 2024	April 6, 2024	Philadelphia, Pennsylvania	Penns Landing Caterers
Joey Janela's Spring Break 9	April 18, 2025	Paradise, Nevada	Pearl Concert Theater at Palms Casino Resort
Joey Janela's Spring Break: Clusterfuck Forever 2025	April 19, 2025	Paradise, Nevada	Pearl Concert Theater at Palms Casino Resort
Joey Janela's Spring Break X	April 17, 2026	Las Vegas, Nevada	Horseshoe Las Vegas
Joey Janela's Spring Break: Immortal Clusterf***	April 18, 2026	Las Vegas, Nevada	Horseshoe Las Vegas

== Events ==
=== Joey Janela's Spring Break ===
No.	Results	Stipulations	Times
1	Sami Callihan defeated Kyle The Beast by pinfall	Singles match	9:45
2	Andy Williams and Penelope Ford defeated Allie and Braxton Sutter by pinfall	Tag team match	8:15
3	Matt Tremont (c) defeated Eddie Kingston by pinfall	Anything Goes Match for the GCW World Championship	10:50
4	Jimmy Lloyd won by last eliminating Ethan Page (Note: Other competitors: Arik Cannon, Bryan Idol, Crazy Boy, Dink, Facade, Flip Gordon, Glacier, Jervis Cottonbelly, John Silver, The Invisible Man and Veda Scott)	Clusterfuck Battle Royal	35:30
5	Lio Rush defeated Keith Lee by pinfall	Singles match	14:00
6	Joey Janela defeated Marty Jannetty by Pinfall	Singles match	12:20
7	Matt Riddle defeated Dan Severn by pinfall	Singles match	8:52
(c) / – the champion(s) heading into the match

=== Joey Janela's Spring Break 2 ===
No.	Results	Stipulations	Times
1	Eli Everfly defeated DJ Z, Gringo Loco, Kyle The Beast, Teddy Hart and Tony Deppen by pinfall	Six-way match	11:07
2	Matt Riddle defeated James Ellsworth by pinfall	Singles match	3:37
3	PCO defeated Walter by pinfall	Singles match	18:27
4	Nick Gage (c) defeated Penta El Zero M by pinfall	No Disqualification match for the GCW World Championship	9:27
5	David Starr defeated Mike Quackenbush by pinfall	Singles match	11:35
6	The Invisible Man won by last eliminating Maxwell Jacob Friedman (Note: Other competitors by order of elimination: Curt Stallion, Kikutaro, Swoggle, Bryan Idol, Facade, Joe Gacy, Wheeler Yuta, Grado, Alabama Doink, Markus Crane, Dan Severn, Chris Dickinson, Rory Gulak, Aeroboy, Crazy Boy, Rickey Shane Page, Martina, Orange Cassidy, Jimmy Lloyd, Ethan Page, Mikey Whipwreck, Nate Webb and Maxwell Jacob Friedman)	Clusterfuck Battle Royal	40:00
7	Joey Janela (with Penelope Ford) defeated The Great Sasuke by pinfall	Singles match	25:00
(c) / – the champion(s) heading into the match

=== Joey Janela's Spring Break 3 Part 1 ===
No.	Results	Stipulations	Times
1	Marko Stunt defeated Joey Janela (with Penelope Ford) by pinfall	Singles match	15:34
2	Tony Deppen defeated Dustin Thomas by pinfall	Singles match	5:22
3	Jungle Boy defeated A-Kid, Australian Suicide, Jake Atlas, Shane Mercer and Slim J by pinfall	Six-way match	10:03
4	Nick Gage (c) defeated Shinjiro Otani by pinfall	Singles match for the GCW World Championship	9:11
5	The Invisible Man defeated Invisible Stan by pinfall	Singles match	7:19
6	Taka Michinoku defeated Orange Cassidy by pinfall	Singles match	8:20
7	Starman defeated Ethan Page by pinfall	Singles match	0:03
8	Masashi Takeda defeated Jimmy Lloyd by pinfall	Death match	8:19
(c) / – the champion(s) heading into the match

=== Joey Janela's Spring Break 3 Part 2 ===
No.	Results	Stipulations
1	Jungle Boy defeated Joey Janela (with Penelope Ford) by submission	Singles match
2	LAX (Santana and Ortiz) defeated The Rock 'n' Roll Express (Ricky Morton & Robert Gibson) by pinfall	Tag team match
3	LA Park defeated Masato Tanaka by pinfall	Singles match
4	The Clusterfuck Battle Royal ended in a no contest (Note: Competitors: A-Kid, AJ Gray, Arik Cannon, Australian Suicide, Brendan Brown, Brian Pillman Jr., Carlos Romo, Caveman Ugg, Cecil Nyx, Chris Dickinson, Colby Corino, Crowbar, Dustin Thomas, Effy, Egotistico Fantastico, Essa Rios, Ethan Page, Facade, Frankie Pickard, G-Raver, George Gatton, Grim Reefer, Gringo Loco, Grizzly Redwood, Homicide, Jake Atlas, Jeff Cannonball, Jimmy Lloyd, Joe Gacy, Joey Ryan, JTG, Kikutaro, Kit Osbourne, Kobe Durst, Kyle The Beast, Lance Lude, Logan Stunt, Lucas Riley, Mantaur, Marko Stunt, Markus Crane, Masashi Takeda, Matt Knicks, Matt Tremont, Maxwell Jacob Friedman, Michael Blais, Mick Moretti, Nate Webb, Necro Butcher, Nick Gage, nWo Sting, Odinson, Ophidian, Parrow, Rich Swann, Rob Killjoy, Sanchez, SeXXXy Eddy, Shad Gaspard, Shane Mercer, SHLAK, Slim J, Swoggle, Teddy Hart, Tony Deppen and Tracy Smothers)	Clusterfuck Battle Royal

=== Joey Janela's Spring Break 4 ===
No.	Results	Stipulations	Times
1	Orange Cassidy defeated Rickey Shane Page (with Atticus Cogar, Eddy Only, Eric Ryan and Gregory Iron) by pinfall	Singles match	8:00
2	Ironbeast (KTB and Shane Mercer) defeated The Rascalz (Dezmond Xavier and Zachary Wentz) by pinfall	Tag team match	9:33
3	Jonathan Gresham defeated Lee Moriarty by submission	Singles match	20:50
4	Team Pazuzu (Chris Dickinson, Santana and Ortiz) defeated Alex Zayne, Blake Christian and Jordan Oliver by pinfall	Six-man tag team match	23:53
5	Tony Deppen defeated Alex Shelley by pinfall	Singles match	13:29
6	Lio Rush defeated ACH by pinfall	Singles match	15:22
7	Ricky Morton defeated Joey Janela by pinfall	Singles match	13:52
8	"Spyder" Nate Webb won the Clusterfuck Battle Royal by last pinning Atticus Cogar (Note: Other competitors by order of elimination: Flash Flanagan, JTG, Sugar Dunkerton, Dominic Garrini, Kevin Ku, Kerry Awful, Nick Iggy, Kerry Morton, Kody Lane, Juicy Finau, Billie Starkz, Kung Fu Janela, Cassandro El Exotico, Jody Threat, Eric Ryan, Gregory Iron, Eddy Only, Solo Darling, Willow Nightingale, Cabana Man Dan, 1 Called Manders, Levi Everett, Parrow, Dustin Thomas, Robert Anthony, Frank The Clown, Elayna Black, Dyln McKay, Steve Sanders, John Thorne, Griffin McCoy, Charlie Tiger, Logan Stunt, Marko Stunt, Cole Radrick, Tahir2x, L0rd Adrean, Ellis Taylor, Mance Warner, Matthew Justice, Effy, The Invisible Man, Jimmy Lloyd, Yoshihiko, Thunderkitty, Allie Kat, Nasty Leroy, Shark Boy, Starboy Charlie, Calvin Tankman and AJ Gray.)	Clusterfuck Battle Royal	72:17
9	Alex Colon (with Markus Crane) defeated Matt Tremont by pinfall	Death match	26:30

=== Joey Janela's Spring Break 6 Part 1 ===
No.	Results	Stipulations	Times
1	The Briscoes (Jay Briscoe and Mark Briscoe) defeated Nick Gage and Slade (Note: Slade replaced Matt Tremont in the title defense due to the latter failing to show up for the event.) (c) and The Second Gear Crew (Mance Warner and Matthew Justice) by pinfall	Three-way tag team match for the GCW Tag Team Championship	11:18
2	Blake Christian defeated AR Fox (with Ayla Fox) by pinfall	Singles match	13:13
3	Mickie James defeated Allie Katch (with Effy) by pinfall	Singles match	11:17
4	Nick Wayne defeated Alec Price, Gringo Loco, Jack Cartwheel, Jimmy Lloyd, Jordan Oliver and Ninja Mack by pinfall	Seven-man scramble	8:09
5	Joey Janela defeated X-Pac by pinfall	Singles match	19:19
6	Jon Moxley (c) defeated AJ Gray by pinfall	Singles match for the GCW World Championship	22:14
7	John Wayne Murdoch defeated Alex Colon (c) by pinfall	Singles match for the GCW Ultraviolent Championship	13:50
(c) / – the champion(s) heading into the match

=== Joey Janela's Spring Break 6 Part 2 - The Greatest Clusterfuck ===
No.	Results	Stipulations	Times
1	Chris Dickinson (with Missy Hyatt) defeated Matt Cardona (with Chelsea Green) by pinfall	Singles match	12:25
2	Tony Deppen defeated Biff Busick by pinfall	Singles match	11:40
3	Mike Bailey defeated Jordan Oliver by pinfall	Singles match	10:02
4	Minoru Suzuki defeated Effy by pinfall	Singles match	9:10
5	The Second Gear Crew (AJ Gray, Mance Warner and Matthew Justice) won the Clusterfuck Battle Royal (Note: The other participants were 1 Called Manders, Alec Price, Big Vin, Billie Starkz, Blake Christian, Brandon Kirk, Buff Bagwell, Charlie Tiger, Cole Radrick, Damian Drake, Dante Leon, Dark Sheik, Deranged, Early Morning Guy Steele, Edith Surreal, Ellis Taylor, George Gatton, Grim Reefer, Hoodfoot, Hunter Freeman, Jack Cartwheel, Jai Vidal, Janai Kai, Jazzy Yang, Jimmy Lloyd, Jimmy Wang Yang, Joey Janela, Josh Barnett, Judas Judd Cassidy, Ju Dizz, Juicy Finau, Kamikaze, Kevin Blackwood, Kevin Matthews, Levi Everett, Lord Adrean, LuFisto, Matt Vandagriff, Maven, Nasty Leroy, Nate Webb, Nick Wayne, Parrow, Rhett Titus, Sam Stackhouse, Sandra Moone, Sean Ross Sapp, Shazza McKenzie, Slade, The Invisible Man and Yoya.)	Clusterfuck Battle Royal	82:49

=== Joey Janela's Spring Break 7 ===
No.	Results	Stipulations	Times
1	Blake Christian defeated Cole Radrick, Gringo Loco, Alec Price, Shane Mercer, Jack Cartwheel, Komander, Billie Starkz and Tony Deppen by pinfall	Grab the Brass Ring Doors, Ladders and Chairs match The winner received a GCW championship match of their choosing at any time.	13:49
2	The East West Express (Jordan Oliver and Nick Wayne) defeated The Motor City Machine Guns (Chris Sabin and Alex Shelley) (c) by pinfall	Tag team match for the GCW World Tag Team Championship	12:37
3	El Hijo del Vikingo defeated Mike Bailey by pinfall	Singles match	17:59
4	Maki Death Kill (Maki Itoh and Nick Gage) defeated Bussy (Allie Katch and Effy) by pinfall	Tag team Deathmatch	16:06
5	Masha Slamovich (c) defeated Steph De Lander (with Matt Cardona) by submission	Singles match for the GCW World Championship	6:21
6	Kota Ibushi defeated Joey Janela by pinfall	Singles match	24:18
(c) / – the champion(s) heading into the match

=== Joey Janela's Spring Break 8 ===
No.	Results	Stipulations	Times
1	Rina Yamashita and Masha Slamovich defeated Masato Tanaka and Minoru Suzuki by pinfall	Tag team match	13:48
2	Mike Bailey and The East West Express (Jordan Oliver and Nick Wayne) defeated The Rock 'n' Roll Express (Ricky Morton and Robert Gibson) and Kerry Morton by pinfall	Six-man tag team match	9:20
3	Dragon Gate Classic (Dragon Kid, Yamato and Kzy) defeated Reiwa New Generation (Ben-K, Kota Minoura and Shun Skywalker) by pinfall	Six-man tag team match	13:53
4	Cole Radrick defeated Mr. Danger, Aigle Blanc, Alec Price, Marcus Mathers, Microman, Myron Reed, Arez and Leon Slater (with Man Like DeReiss)	Grab the Brass Ring Ladder match The winner received a future GCW World Championship match.	17:04
5	Matt Cardona (with Deathmatch Royalty (Jimmy Lloyd and Steph De Lander)) defeated Blue Pain by pinfall	Singles match	9:02
6	Amazing Red defeated Gringo Loco by pinfall	Singles match	15:58
7	Mance Warner defeated Effy	"I Quit" match	21:46
8	Maki Death Kill (Nick Gage and Maki Itoh) defeated Ram Kaicho and Danhausen by pinfall	Mixed tag team match	12:56
9	Blake Christian (c) (with Shane Mercer) defeated Joey Janela (with Missy Hyatt) by pinfall	Singles match for the GCW World Championship	29:45
(c) / – the champion(s) heading into the match

=== Joey Janela's Spring Break: Clusterfuck Forever 2024 ===
No.	Results	Stipulations	Times
1	Violence is Forever (Dominic Garrini and Kevin Ku) (c) defeated The Bollywood Boyz (Gurv Sihra and Harv Sihra), Juicy Finau and Zilla Fatu and Los Macizos (Ciclope and Miedo Extremo)	Punjabi Prison match for the GCW Tag Team Championship	14:32
2	Microman won by last eliminating Nick Gage (Note: Other competitors in the match: 1 Called Manders, Johnny Kashmere, Alex Zayne, H. C. Loc, "Spyder" Nate Webb, Aerial Van Go, Tony Deppen, Cheech, Tank, Grim Reefer, Beastman, Sam Stackhouse, Brandon Kirk, Kasey Catal, Bam Sullivan, CPA, Aja Kong, Lindsay Snow, Jimmy Lloyd, Charlie Tiger, Davey Bang, Tony DeVito, Jay Lyon, Midas Black, Mercedes Martinez, Marcus Mathers, Mike Bailey, August Matthews, Kaplan, Bobby Flaco, Tara Zep, Terry Yaki, The Green Phantom, Masha Slamovich, Sawyer Wreck, SeXXXy Eddy, Cheeseburger, Colin Delaney, Monmouth, Mr. Danger, Jordan Oliver, Man Like DeReiss, Alec Price, Chiitan, Cole Radrick, The American Giant, Big Vin, Dark Sheik, Double Unicorn Dark, Dr. Cube, Edith Surreal, Jamie Lynn Senegal, Facade, Emil J, Frank The Clown, Fuego Del Sol, Jeffrey John, Jason Knight, Gringo Loco, Kasey Catal, Justin Credible, Tommy Dreamer, Kurt Bale, Lance Scaper, Parrow, Philly Mike, Pollo Del Mar, Rina Yamashita, Rob Killjoy, Rob Shit, Shane Douglas, Shota, Silver Potato, The Fighting Chicken, Trevor Outlaw, Viva Van, White Mike, and Yoshihiko.)	80-person Clusterfuck Battle Royal	1:57:52
(c) / – the champion(s) heading into the match

=== Joey Janela's Spring Break: Clusterfuck Forever 2025 ===
No.	Results	Stipulations	Times
1	Gringo Loco defeated Ciclope, Facade, Jimmy Lloyd, Man Like DeReiss, Marcus Mathers, Mike D Vecchio, Ninja Mack and Sidney Akeem	Scramble Steel cage match	11:32
2	Brodie Lee Jr. won by last eliminating Joey Janela (Note: Other competitors of the match: 1 Called Manders, 2 Tuff Tony, Aerial Van Go, Alec Price, Ashley Vox, August Matthews, B3cca, Bam Sullivan, Big F'n Joe, Blanket Jackson, Bobby Flaco, Bodhi Young Prodigy, Brad Baylor, Brayden Toon, Brittnie Brooks, Channing Decker, Cheeseburger, CPA, Dan Barry, Dani Mo, Dan The Dad, Davey Bang, Dr. Redacted, Dustin Thomas, Effy, Frankie B, Frank The Clown, Harlon Abbott, Human Tornado, Jack Cartwheel, Jackson Drake, Jai Vidal, Jeffrey John, JGeorge, John Wayne Murdoch, JP Grayson, Juventud Guerrera, Kerry Morton, Kidd Bandit, Lady KillJoy, Lena Kross, Lou Nixon, Man Like DeReiss, Masha Slamovich, Matt Tremont, MBM, MBM's Friend (Ultima Sombra), Megan Bayne, Mickie Knuckles, Microman, Mike Jackson, Miu Watanabe, Nate Webb, New Roy (Nasty Leroy), Parrow, Paul London, Raku, Randy Myers, Rhys Maddox, Ricky Smokes, Ruffo The Clown, Sam Holloway, Santana Jackson, Shino Suzuki, Shreddy, Sleepy Ed, Snitsky, Sonico, Sonny Kiss, Starboy Charlie, Steven Crowe, Super Crazy, Tara Zep, Terry Yaki, The Invisible Man, The Warlord, Thomas Shire, Tombstone Jesus, Tommy Grayson, Tommy Invincible, Unagi Sayaka, Vipress, Viva Van, Yabo The Clown, Yoshihiko, Zayda Steel.)	90-person Clusterfuck Battle Royal	2:19:45

=== Joey Janela's Spring Break X ===
No.	Results	Stipulations	Times
1	1 Called Manders defeated Masato Tanaka, Vipress, Bear Bronson, Terry Yaki, Shotzi Blackheart, Vengador, Sidney Akeem, Gringo Loco, Man Like DeReiss, and Charles Mason by pinfall	Grab the Brass Ring Doors, Ladders and Chairs match The winner earned a future GCW World Championship match.	21:52
2	The Rascalz (Dezmond Xavier, Myron Reed, and Zachary Wentz) defeated Marcus Mathers and Bustah and The Brain (Alec Price and Jordan Oliver) by pinfall	Six-man tag team match	15:42
3	Atticus Cogar (c) defeated Hayabusa by pinfall	Singles match for the GCW World Championship	14:43
4	Jurassic Express ("Jungle" Jack Perry and Marko Stunt) defeated KJ Orso and Sam Stackhouse by pinfall	Tag team match	16:10
5	The Invisible Man (with Bill Alfonso) defeated The Sandman by pinfall	Singles match	20:54
6	Effy defeated Allie Katch by pinfall	Loser Leaves GCW match	25:47
7	Megan Bayne and Nick Gage defeated Mance Warner and Steph De Lander	Mixed tag team match	14:54
8	Brodie Lee Jr. (with Man Like DeReiss) defeated Joey Janela by pinfall	Singles match	28:47
(c) / – the champion(s) heading into the match

=== Joey Janela's Spring Break: Immortal Clusterfuck ===
No.	Results	Stipulations	Times
1	Matt Tremont defeated Otis Cogar (c) by pinfall	Hardcore Kingdom Steel Cage match for the GCW Ultraviolent Championship	16:45
2	Shotzi Blackheart won by last eliminating Slade (Note: Competitors in order of elimination: Tommy Grayson, JP Grayson, Sam Holloway, Man Like DeReiss, Ro Montana, Juli Montana, B3cca, Nate Webb, Shay Kassidy, Kingsley, Brick Savage, Sam Stackhouse, Ryan O'Neill, Marcus Mathers, Wyatt Rhodes, Brooke Havok, Matt Mako, Beastman, Sean Ross Sapp, Bryan Alvarez, KJ Orso, Stunt Marshall, Juicy Finau, Airica Demia, Killer Kelly, Gisele Shaw, Dark Sheik, Jordan Oliver, Alec Price, 1 Called Manders, Thomas Shire, Jazzy Yang, Bobby Flaco, Jay Lucas, Terry Yaki, Ian Maxwell, Helix, Emily Jaye, Channing Decker, The Invisible Man, Joey Janela, Starman, LJ Cleary, Don Freeze, Monomoth, D'Lo Brown, Katie Arquette, Will Kiedis, Sleepy Ed, Jack Osborne, Brooke Havok, Bobby Flaco, Rhys Maddox, Manny Lemons, Jimmy Townsend, Dinosaur I, Dinosaur II, Dinosaur III, Juni Underwood, Anakin Murphy, Devious Cass, Logan Cavazos, Sleepy Ed, Classy Ali, Sal Mistretta, Cereal Man, Nixi XS, Parrow, Bear Bronson, "Hollywood" Haley J, 25 Cent, Jimmy Lloyd, Heath Slater, Tombstone Jesus, Mullet Man, Frank the Clown, Tara Zep, Conor Claxton, Toby Klein, Gabby Forza, Dr. Redacted, CPA, Vipress, Slade.)	87-person Immortal Clusterfuck Battle Royal	2:49:53
(c) / – the champion(s) heading into the match
