= Acid Cup 3 =

2021 Game Changer Wrestling pay-per-view event

- Promotional poster
- Promotion: Game Changer Wrestling
- Date: April 8–9, 2021
- City: Tampa, Florida
- Venue: Cuban Club

Game Changer Wrestling event chronology
← Previous rSpring Break presented by 44OH!	Next → Allie Kat's Real Hot Girl Sh*t

Acid Cup 3 was two-day a professional wrestling pay-per-view event and tournament produced by Game Changer Wrestling (GCW). The show took place from April 8, 2021 and April 9, 2021 at the Cuban Club in Tampa, Florida and was streamed live on FITE TV as part of the Collective during WrestleMania 37 weekend.

== Production ==
=== Background ===
The Acid Cup was first held on October 22, 2016 at the 2300 Arena in Philadelphia, Pennsylvania in honor of Trent Acid, a wrestler who had wrestled in several promotions including Combat Zone Wrestling (CZW), Ring of Honor, Pro Wrestling Unplugged (PWU), and Juggalo Championship Wrestling (JCW) who had passed away in 2010 of a drug overdose. The first winner of the Acid Cup tournament was Joey Janela who defeated Pinkie Sanchez. From March 19, 2020 to March 20, 2020, GCW held a second Acid Cup tournament at the Voltage Lounge in Philadelphia which was initially scheduled for one night prior to the COVID-19 pandemic. The winner of the tournament was Chris Dickinson who defeated Blake Christian in the final round. February 8, 2021, GCW announced that Acid Cup 3 would take place during WrestleMania 37 weekend as part of the Collective Remix in Ybor City, Florida. On March 1, 2021, GCW announced that Dragon Bane would be competing in the Acid Cup.

== Storylines ==
Acid Cup 3 featured professional wrestling matches that involves different wrestlers from pre-existing scripted feuds and storylines. Wrestlers portrayed villains, heroes, or less distinguishable characters in scripted events that built tension and culminated in a wrestling match or series of matches. Storylines were produced on Game Changer Wrestling's various pay-per-view events.

== Results ==
Night 1 - April 8, 2021
No.	Results	Stipulations
1	Calvin Tankman defeated Colby Corino by pinfall	Acid Cup 3 first round match
2	Laredo Kid defeated Brayden Lee by pinfall	Acid Cup 3 first round match
3	Dragon Bane defeated KTB by pinfall	Acid Cup 3 first round match
4	Jordan Oliver defeated Edith Surreal by pinfall	Acid Cup 3 first round match
5	Lee Moriarty defeated JJ Garrett by pinfall	Acid Cup 3 first round match
6	Arez defeated Aramis by pinfall	Acid Cup 3 first round match
7	Cole Radrick defeated Ellis Taylor and Jimmy Lloyd by pinfall	Acid Cup 3 first round three-way match
8	AJ Gray defeated Nate Webb by pinfall	Acid Cup 3 first round match

Night 2 - April 9, 2021
No.	Results	Stipulations
1	Calvin Tankman defeated Dragon Bane by pinfall	Acid Cup 3 second round match
2	Laredo Kid defeated Brayden Lee by pinfall	Acid Cup 3 second round match
3	Dragon Bane defeated KTB by pinfall	Acid Cup 3 second round match
4	Lee Moriarty defeated AJ Gray by pinfall	Acid Cup 3 second round match
5	Cole Radrick defeated Arez by pinfall	Acid Cup 3 second round match
6	Jordan Oliver defeated Brayden Lee by pinfall	Acid Cup 3 second round match
7	El Hijo de Canis Lupus defeated Gabriel Skye by pinfall	Singles match
8	Lee Moriarty defeated Calvin Tankman by pinfall	Acid Cup 3 semi-final match
9	Jordan Oliver defeated Cole Radrick by pinfall	Acid Cup 3 semi-final match
10	Ken Broadway defeated Damian Drake, Facade, Lucas Riley, Marcus Mathers, and Matt Vandagriff	six-way scramble match
11	Jordan Oliver defeated Lee Moriarty by pinfall	Acid Cup 3 final match
