= The Wrld on GCW (2022) =

2022 Game Changer Wrestling event

- Promotional poster featuring various GCW wrestlers
- Promotion: Game Changer Wrestling
- Date: January 23, 2022
- City: New York City, New York
- Venue: Hammerstein Ballroom
- Attendance: 2,025 (sold out)

Event chronology
← Previous; Say You Will	Next → Fight Club: Houston 2

The Wrld on GCW chronology
← Previous; Fight Forever: The Wrld On GCW Part III	Next → 2023

The Wrld on GCW (stylized as The WRLD on GCW) was a professional wrestling pay-per-view (PPV) event promoted by Game Changer Wrestling (GCW) that was held on January 23, 2022. The event was held at the Hammerstein Ballroom in New York City, marking the promotion's debut in the Hammerstein Ballroom and the first wrestling event held in the venue since 2019. The event was available on FITE TV and via traditional PPV outlets, making it the first GCW event to air on traditional PPV.

11 matches were contested at the event, including two on the Kickoff pre-show on YouTube. In the main event, Matt Tremont and Nick Gage defeated The Briscoe Brothers (Jay Briscoe and Mark Briscoe) to win the GCW Tag Team Championship. In other prominent matches, Jon Moxley defeated Homicide to retain the GCW World Championship, Jeff Jarrett defeated Effy, and Matt Cardona defeated Joey Janela. The event also notably saw the GCW returns or debuts of Ruby Soho, Sean Waltman, Brian Myers, Marko Stunt, Virgil, Sabu, and Bill Alfonso.

== Production ==
Other on-screen personnel
Role:	Name:
Commentators	Kevin Gill
Commentators	Dave Prazak
Commentators	Lenny Leonard
Commentators	Ian Riccaboni
Ring announcers	Emil Jay

=== Background ===
On October 9, 2021, during their Fight Club event, GCW announced that they would be holding their inaugural event at the Hammerstein Ballroom on January 23, 2022. The event was later revealed to be the fourth edition of the promotion's The Wrld on GCW event. On November 26, the Wrestling Observer Newsletter reported that the event was sold out. On January 12, 2022, it was announced that the event would air on traditional pay-per-view (PPV) outlets in addition to FITE TV, making it the first GCW event to air on traditional PPV outlets. In an article on January 20, DAZN referred to the event as GCW's most "significant event to date". As part of The Wrld on GCW weekend, GCW held the 2022 Indie Wrestling Hall of Fame ceremony on January 22.

In addition to GCW wrestlers, wrestlers from All Elite Wrestling, Impact Wrestling, Lucha Libre AAA Worldwide, and Ring of Honor were scheduled to appear at the event. "Heatwave '98" by Jynx and "Targeted Individual" by Wicca Phase Springs Eternal were the official theme songs for the event.

=== Storylines ===
The Wrld on GCW featured eleven professional wrestling matches, with different wrestlers involved in pre-existing scripted feuds, plots and storylines. Wrestlers portrayed either heels or faces as they engaged in a series of tension-building events, which culminated in a wrestling match.

== Results ==
No.	Results	Stipulations	Times
1^{P}	Big Vin won by last eliminating Charles Mason (Note: The other participants were: Psycho Clown, Dark Sheik, Cole Radrick, Parrow, Hoodfoot, Ruckus, KTB, Juicy Finau, Steve Scott, Nate Webb, Brandon Kirk, Janai Kai, Dustin Thomas, Marcus Mathers, Yoya, B-Boy, Lufisto, and Thunder Rosa.)	Pabst Blue Ribbon Kickoff Battle Royal	16:01
2^{P}	Grim Reefer defeated Alex Zayne, Dante Leon, Shane Mercer, Jack Cartwheel, and Ninja Mack	Pabst Blue Ribbon Kickoff Scramble match	7:54
3	AJ Gray defeated PCO, Alex Colon, G-Raver, Tony Deppen, Jimmy Lloyd, and Jordan Oliver	Grab the Brass Ring Ladder match Winner will receive a match of their choosing at any time.	16:47
4	Team Gringo (Gringo Loco, Arez, and Demonic Flamita) defeated Team Bandido (Bandido, ASF, and Laredo Kid) by pinfall	Trios match This match was held under Lucha Libre rules.	14:09
5	Blake Christian defeated Lio Rush by pinfall	Singles match	12:34
6	Matt Cardona (with Chelsea Green) defeated Joey Janela by pinfall	Singles match	19:43
7	Second Gear Crew (Mance Warner and Matthew Justice) (with Sabu and Bill Alfonso) defeated 44OH! (Atticus Cogar, Eddy Only, Gregory Iron, and Bobby Beverly) by pinfall	4-on-2 handicap match Bill Alfonso counted the pinfall for this match.	—
8	Ruby Soho defeated Allie Katch by pinfall	Singles match	9:36
9	Jeff Jarrett defeated Effy by pinfall	Singles match	11:13
10	Jon Moxley (c) defeated Homicide by pinfall	Singles match for the GCW World Championship	11:14
11	Matt Tremont and Nick Gage (with Dewey Donovan) defeated The Briscoe Brothers (Jay Briscoe and Mark Briscoe) (c) by pinfall	Tag team open challenge for the GCW Tag Team Championship	5:28
(c) / – the champion(s) heading into the match; P / – the match was broadcast on the pre-show

== See also ==
- 2022 in professional wrestling
