= Dark Sheik =

American professional wrestler

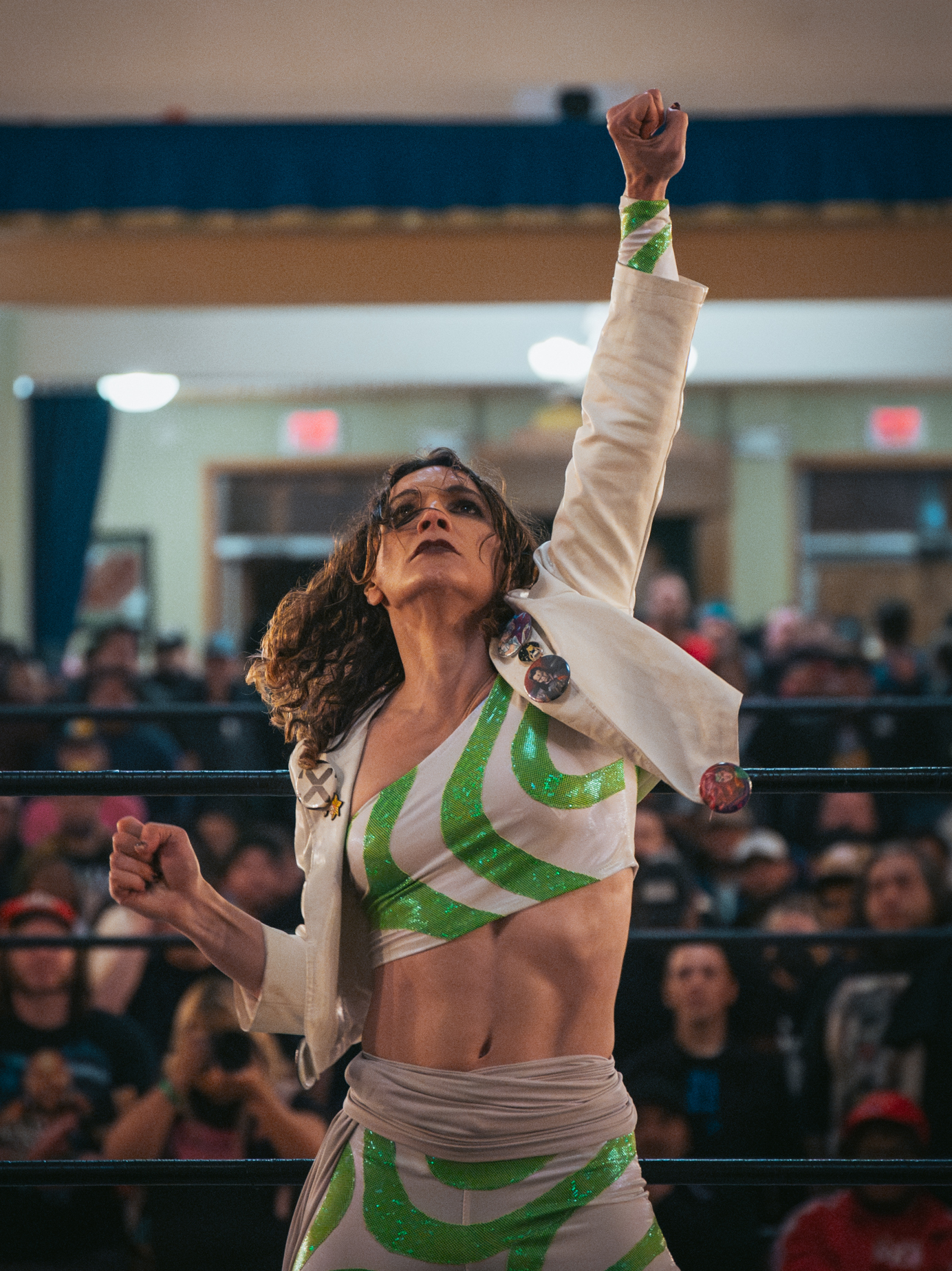
- Sheik in February 2024

Personal information
- Born: July 27, 1985 (age 41) Atlanta, Georgia, U.S.

Professional wrestling career
- Ring names: Sheik Khan Abadi; Harley Qunt; Dark Sheik; Persian Tiger; Tiger Kid; The Shadow; Sammy K; Bud Stone; Buffalo Sheik; Snakebite Jones; Lucha Magnifico; Lucy D; Girl Raven
- Billed height: 5 ft 7 in (170 cm)
- Billed weight: 144 lb (65 kg)
- Debut: 2001

Sam Khandaghabadi (born July 27, 1985), better known by her ring name Dark Sheik (sometimes stylized as DARK Sheik), is an American professional wrestler currently working as a freelancer. She is best known for her tenure with Game Changer Wrestling, All Pro Wrestling and various other promotions from the American independent scene. She is also the founder of Hoodslam, an avantgarde style promotion based out of Oakland, California.

== Professional wrestling career ==
=== American independent circuit (2001–present) ===
Khandaghabadi made her professional wrestling debut in Big Time Wrestling at a house show promoted on September 20, 2005, under the ring name of "Sheik Khan Abadi", where she fell short to Mike Silva in singles competition. On the local Bay Area podcast Bay Waves, Sam revealed the name 'Sheik' was given to her by the trainers as a derogatory term based on her Iranian heritage, with the aim to give her a villain moniker in the height of the Iraq War. She was known for her tenures with various promotions from the American independent scene with which she has shared brief or longer stints such as All Pro Wrestling, Devil Mountain Wrestling, North American Wrestling and West Coast Pro Wrestling.

=== Hoodslam (2010–present) ===
In 2010, Khandaghabadi founded the Hoodslam promotion as a regular gathering for wrestlers who wanted to perform edgier acts for adults. Hoodslam performances combine the athleticism and tropes of professional wrestling with more bizarre, absurd characters, as well as profanity, sexuality, and public consumption of drugs and alcohol, which are not considered appropriate at mainstream professional wrestling events. As a result, entry to Hoodslam shows is restricted to those aged 21 years or older.

In Hoodslam, she is a former three-time Best Athlete In The East Bay Championship, a former Hoodslam Golden Gig Champion and a former Intergalactic Tag Team Champion, title which she has won on two separate occasions, both alongside Vipress and Anton Voorhees, stablemates of the "Caution" unit.

=== Game Changer Wrestling (2020–present) ===
Dark Sheik made her debut in Game Changer Wrestling at GCW Effy's Big Gay Brunch 2020 on October 10, where she fell short to Still Life With Apricots And Pears in singles competition.

Dark Sheik competed in various signature events of the promotion. She made her first appearance at the 2022 edition of the Joey Janela's Spring Break, where she competed in the traditional Clusterfuck Battle Royal won by The Second Gear Crew (AJ Gray, Mance Warner and Matthew Justice) and also involving various notable opponents, both male and female such as Jimmy Wang Yang, Joey Janela, Josh Barnett, Kamikaze, LuFisto, Maven and others. At The Wrld on GCW on January 23, 2022, she competed in a Pabst Blue Ribbon Kickoff Battle Royal won by Big Vin and also involving Psycho Clown, Ruckus, Janai Kai, B-Boy, Thunder Rosa and many others.

Dark Sheik competed for various titles promoted by GCW. At GCW The Coldest Winter 2 on February 3, 2024, she unsuccessfully challenged Blake Christian for the GCW World Championship. At GCW Ashes To Ashes 2024 on March 9, she teamed up with Sawyer Wreck as "Xunt" and unsuccessfully challenged Violence Is Forever (Dominic Garrini and Kevin Ku) for the GCW Tag Team Championship.

At GCW Vs. DDT, an event co-promoted alongside DDT Pro-Wrestling on March 31, 2023, Dark Sheik defeated Saki Akai.

== Personal life ==
Khandaghabadi came out publicly as a trans woman during a Hoodslam show in 2019. She was born in Alpharetta, Georgia, in an Iranian-American family and has an older brother. Her mother died of cancer in 1994. Along with her professional wrestling life, Khandaghabadi said she had also trained in martial arts and participated in the adult film industry.

== Championships and accomplishments ==
- Devil Mountain Wrestling
  - DMW Championship (4 times)
  - DMW Triple X Championship (1 time)
  - ACE Unified Tag Team Championship (1 time) – with Alexis Darevko
  - DMW Title Tournament (2011)
- Hoodslam
  - Best Athlete In The East Bay Championship (3 times) (1 time - with Ean Hancement)
  - Hoodslam Golden Gig Championship (1 time)
  - Intergalactic Tag Team Championship (3 times) – with Vipress (1), Juice Lee (1) and Anton Voorhees (1)
- North American Wrestling
  - NAW American Championship (2 times)
  - NAW Tag Team Championship (1 time) – with Alexis Darevko
- Paris Is Bumping
  - Paris Is Bumping Grand Prize Championship (1 time)
- Piledriver Pro Wrestling
  - PPW Golden State Championship (1 time, inaugural)
- Pro Wrestling Illustrated
  - Ranked No. 184 of the top 500 singles wrestlers in the PWI 500 of 2023
  - Ranked No. 116 of the top 150 female singles wrestlers in the PWI Women's 150 in 2021
- Underground Wrestling Alliance
  - Queen Of The Underground Tournament (2023)
- Wrestling Pro Wrestling
  - WPW Midcard Championship (1 time)
