= Joey Janela's Spring Break 9 =

2025 Game Changer Wrestling pay-per-view event

- Promotional poster
- Promotion: Game Changer Wrestling
- Date: April 18, 2025
- City: Las Vegas, Nevada
- Venue: Pearl Theater at Palms Casino Resort

Game Changer Wrestling event chronology
← Previous; Josh Barnett's Bloodsport XIII	Next → Enter The Zone

Joey Janela's Spring Break 9 was a professional wrestling pay-per-view event produced by Game Changer Wrestling (GCW). The show took place on April 18, 2025 at the Pearl Theater at Palms Casino Resort in Las Vegas, Nevada and was streamed live on Triller TV as part of the Collective during WrestleMania 41 weekend. The event also featured the final match for Sabu, a pioneer of hardcore wrestling dating back to the 1990s when he wrestled in Frontier Martial–Arts Wrestling (FMW) and Extreme Championship Wrestling (ECW) while also holding championships in Border City Wrestling (BCW), Juggalo Championship Wrestling (JCW), the National Wrestling Alliance (NWA), Total Nonstop Action Wrestling (TNA), New Japan Pro-Wrestling, and WWE.

== Production ==
=== Background ===
On January 19, 2025 during the The People vs. GCW pay-per-view in New York City, after Joey Janela defeated Masato Tanaka, Sabu made a surprise appearance to challenge Janela. However, the match would be Sabu's final match before retiring from professional wrestling after this match. In addition to the announcement of the match, GCW announced that Joey Janela's Spring Break 9 would take place at the Palms Casino Resort in Las Vegas, Nevada.

On February 25, 2025, Janela announced that a six-man tag team match would take place during the pay-per-view between The Wagner Family (Dr. Wagner Jr., El Hijo del Dr. Wagner Jr., and Galeno del Mal) and Los Desperados (Arez, Gringo Loco and Jack Cartwheel). On March 18, 2025, Janela announced that a match between Zack Sabre Jr. and 1 Called Manders had been added to the card. On March 19, 2025, Janela announced that a re-match between Gabe Kidd and Mance Warner was set to take place during the pay-per-view. On March 24, 2025, Janela announced the Senior Scramble which was a six-way scramble match in which all of the participating wrestlers were over 55 years old.

=== Storylines ===
Joey Janela's Spring Break 9 featured professional wrestling matches that involves different wrestlers from pre-existing scripted feuds and storylines. Wrestlers portrayed villains, heroes, or less distinguishable characters in scripted events that built tension and culminated in a wrestling match or series of matches. Storylines were produced on Game Changer Wrestling's various pay-per-view events.

=== Aftermath ===
Three months after the event, Sabu had died at the age of 60 on May 11, 2025. According to the Wrestling Observer Newsletter, his cause of death was not publicized due to him and his estranged wife never formally divorcing. However, GCW came under scrutiny after Janela had revealed in an interview that Sabu was given kratom despite his physical condition at the time. GCW has since denied any involvement in Sabu's death.

== Results ==
No.	Results	Stipulations	Times
1	YDNP (Alec Price and Jordan Oliver) (with Cole Radrick) defeated Violence is Forever (Dominic Garrini and Kevin Ku) (c) by pinfall	Tag team match for the GCW Tag Team Championship	6:58
2	The Wagner Family (Dr. Wagner Jr., El Hijo del Dr. Wagner Jr., and Galeno del Mal) defeated Los Desperados (Arez, Gringo Loco and Jack Cartwheel) by pinfall	Six-man tag team match	17:02
3	Megan Bayne defeated Bozilla by pinfall	Singles match	12:10
4	Zack Sabre Jr. defeated 1 Called Manders by pinfall	Singles match	7:54
5	Atticus Cogar (career) defeated Fuego Del Sol (mask) by pinfall	Mask vs. GCW Career Anything Goes match	17:47
6	Minoru Suzuki vs. Matt Tremont ended in a no contest	Singles match	9:30
7	Masha Slamovich (c) defeated Suzu Suzuki by pinfall	Singles match for the JCW World Championship	9:50
8	Gabe Kidd defeated Mance Warner by pinfall	Singles match	14:36
9	Damián 666, George South, Mike Jackson, Ricky Morton and Robert Gibson defeated Kerry Morton by pinfall	Senior Scramble match	6:12
10	Sabu defeated Joey Janela by pinfall	No Rope Barbed Wire match This was Sabu's retirement match.	17:11
(c) / – the champion(s) heading into the match
