= DDT Goes Hollywood =

2023 DDT Pro-Wrestling event

- Promotion: CyberFight
- Brand: DDT Pro-Wrestling
- Date: March 30, 2023
- City: Los Angeles, California
- Venue: Ukrainian Cultural Center

DDT Pro-Wrestling events chronology
← Previous; Kengan Ashura X DDT Pro Wrestling Collaboration	Next → GCW vs. DDT

DDT Goes Hollywood was a professional wrestling pay-per-view event produced by DDT Pro-Wrestling. The event took place on March 30, 2023 at the Ukrainian Cultural Center in Los Angeles, California in conjunction with Game Changer Wrestling's (GCW) Collective during WrestleMania 39 weekend and was streamed live on FITE TV.

== Production ==
=== Background ===
On April 4, 2019, DDT held its first event in the United States titled DDT Is Coming to America at La Boom in Queens, New York during WrestleMania 35 weekend. Two days later, DDT teamed up with Kaiju Big Battel to present Kaiju Big Battel vs. DDT at the Bell House. On October 22, 2022, GCW announced that DDT would be returning to the United States with two events during the Collective. DDT Goes Hollywood and GCW vs. DDT. On February 6, 2023, DDT announced that Konosuke Takeshita would fight against Yuki Ueno during the event. On February 16, 2023, it was announced that Eddie Kingston would be teaming up with Jun Akiyama to fight against Daisuke Sasaki and Kanon.

=== Storylines ===
DDT Goes Hollywood featured professional wrestling matches that involves different wrestlers from pre-existing scripted feuds and storylines. Wrestlers portrayed villains, heroes, or less distinguishable characters in scripted events that built tension and culminated in a wrestling match or series of matches. Storylines were produced on DDT Pro-Wrestling's various events.

== Results ==
No.	Results	Stipulations	Times
1	The37Kamiina (Mao and Shunma Katsumata) defeated Chris Brookes and Yoshihiko by pinfall	Tag team match As a result, Mao won Yoshihiko's Ironman Heavymetalweight Championship	17:31
2	Pheromones (Yuki "Sexy" Iino and Danshoku "Dandy" Dino) vs. Takagi Army (Sanshiro Takagi and Michael Nakazawa) ended in a no contest	Tag team match	11:03
3	Kazusada Higuchi and Takeshi Masada defeated Andrew "The Giant" Everett and Nick Wayne by pinfall	Singles match	11:34
4	Saki Akai defeated Vert Vixen by pinfall	Singles match	6:09
5	Tetsuya Endo defeated Joey Janela by pinfall	Singles match	15:28
6	Jun Akiyama and Eddie Kingston defeated Damnation T.A. (Daisuke Sasaki and Kanon) by pinfall	Tag team match	10:35
7	Konosuke Takeshita defeated Yuki Ueno by pinfall	Singles match	15:16
