= The Gate of Sin City =

2026 Dragon Gate USA event

- Promotion(s): Dragon Gate; Dragon Gate USA
- Date: April 15, 2026
- City: Paradise, Nevada
- Venue: Horseshoe Las Vegas

Dragon Gate USA events chronology
← Previous; The Gate of Revolution	Next → —

The Gate of Sin City was a professional wrestling pay-per-view event produced by Dragon Gate under the Dragon Gate USA (DGUSA) brand. The event took place on April 15, 2026 at Horseshoe Las Vegas in Paradise, Nevada in conjunction with Game Changer Wrestling's (GCW) Collective during WrestleMania 42 weekend and was streamed live on Triller TV.

== Production ==
Other on-screen personnel
Role:	Name:
Commentators	Joe Dombrowski
Commentators	Larry Dallas

=== Background ===
Dragon Gate USA was originally established as an international branch of the Dragon Gate promotion in Japan with Satoru Oji serving as the promotion's President and former lead booker of Ring of Honor Gabe Sapolsky serving as the promotion's vice president. The promotion had featured notable names from the Dragon Gate promotion in Japan including Cima, Dragon Kid, Yamato, Shingo Takagi, Ryo Saito, Shiima Xion, and BxB Hulk alongside several American and international independent wrestlers such as Ricochet, Drew Galloway, Timothy Thatcher, Johnny Gargano, Mike Quackenbush, Soldier Ant, Fire Ant, Eddie Kingston, Jon Moxley, Bryan Danielson, Caleb Konley, Jake Crist the Young Bucks, Sabu, and 2 Cold Scorpio. In addition to featuring wrestlers from the Dragon Gate promotion, Dragon Gate's titles were also recognized. The promotion's first event was held on July 25, 2009 titled Enter The Dragon which took place at The Arena in Philadelphia, Pennsylvania and aired on tape delay as a pay-per-view event on September 5, 2009. The promotion closed down in 2015 with its library eventually being acquired by WWE in 2020.

On April 15, 2025, DGUSA made its return with the Rebirth pay-per-view which took place at the Palms Casino Resort in Las Vegas, Nevada. A second event was held two days later titled The Gate of Revolution.

On January 5, 2026, Game Changer Wrestling announced that DGUSA would be returning to the Collective at Horseshoe Las Vegas in Paradise, Nevada.

=== Storylines ===
The Gate of Sin City featured professional wrestling matches that involves different wrestlers from pre-existing scripted feuds and storylines. Wrestlers portrayed villains, heroes, or less distinguishable characters in scripted events that built tension and culminated in a wrestling match or series of matches. Storylines were produced on Dragon Gate's various events.

== Results ==
No.	Results	Stipulations	Times
1	Willie Mack defeated El Cucuy and Kai by pinfall	Three-way match	10:53
2	Ho Ho Lun and La Estrella defeated Channing Decker and Rhys Maddox by pinfall	Tag team match	9:51
3	Marcus Mathers defeated Susumu Yokosuka by pinfall	Singles match	12:47
4	Love and Peace (Ben-K and Hyo) defeated Bustah and The Brain (Alec Price and Jordan Oliver) and Los Hermanos De La Jungla (Aero Panther and Fight Panther Jr.) by pinfall	Three-way tag team match	11:03
5	Yamato defeated Jonathan Gresham by pinfall	Singles match	17:06
6	Dragon Kid, Kzy, and Yuki Yoshioka defeated Gajadokuro (Ishin, Madoka Kikuta, and Yoshiki Kato) (with Kai) by pinfall	Six-man tag team match	21:28
