= IndependentWrestling.tv =

Professional wrestling streaming service

- Broadcast area: Worldwide
- Headquarters: Pennsylvania, United States

Programming
- Language: English

Ownership
- Owner: Jerry Durling

History
- Launched: 2016
- Founder: Gerard Durling; Adam Lash
- Former names: Powerbomb.tv

Links
- Website: independentwrestling.tv

IndependentWrestling.tv (IWTV), formerly known as Powerbomb.tv is a professional wrestling subscription streaming service owned by Jerry Durling. The service also books their own professional wrestling events under the IWTV banner.

== History ==
In 2016, Gerard Durling, a former professional wrestler, launched Powerbomb.tv, a streaming service which featured live and taped professional wrestling events from various independent promotions. On June 11, 2017, Powerbomb.tv presented their inaugural Break the Barrier Festival at the GSW Arena in Old Forge, Pennsylvania. On October 22, 2017, the first Powerbomb.tv Independent Champion was crowned during a tournament with Jonathan Gresham becoming the first champion. On November 1, 2017, Durling presented a "3-minute elevator pitch" to Wilkes-Barre Connect’s PITCH program.

On December 31, 2017, Powerbomb.tv announced that they would be rebranding to IndependentWrestling.tv in 2019 beginning with the premiere of Beyond Wrestling's weekly show Uncharted Territory. On April 4, 2019, IWTV joined Game Changer Wrestling (GCW) to present the inaugural Family Reunion event as part of the GCW's Collective at the White Eagle Hall in Jersey City, New Jersey. On October 14, 2020, IWTV launched The Masked Wrestler, a reality show co-produced with Beyond Wrestling which blends a mystery competition format with independent wrestling.

In December 2020, Game Changer Wrestling ended their partnership with IWTV, later moving their content exclusively to Triller TV. In June 2021, IWTV filed a lawsuit against GCW alleging that the promotion had breached their contract. GCW filed a motion to dismiss the lawsuit on September 13, 2021 claiming that the contract was procured under highly problematic circumstances evidencing fraud and duress and that the contract includes a limitation of damage provision that expressly prohibits recovery of lost profits and failed to state a claim upon which relief could be granted. On April 20, 2022, GCW announced that they had reached a settlement with IWTV to bring an end to the litigation between the promotion and the streaming service. In addition to this announcement, GCW announced that they would be streaming an eight-part event series titled the Settlement Series with the first event held on July 10, 2022 in Ridgefield Park, New Jersey.

On January 2, 2022, Beyond Wrestling streamed the first Wrestling Open event on the service. On December 31, 2022, the first IWTV Independent Wrestling Tag Team Champions were crowned during Beyond Wrestling's Heavy Lies The Crown event with Violence is Forever (Dominic Garrini and Kevin Ku) being crowned the first champions. On January 1, 2026, after 4825 (Jaden Newman and Jamesen Shook) had vacated the titles, Bang And Matthews (August Matthews and Davey Bang) won the vacant IWTV Independent Wrestling Tag Team Championship in a finals match for a tournament against Miracle Generation (Dustin Waller and Kylon King).

== Championships ==
Championship	Current champion(s)	Reign	Date won	Days held	Location	Event	Notes	Ref.
Undisputed IWTV Independent Wrestling World Championship	Mance Warner	1	April 14, 2026	188+	Las Vegas, Nevada	ACTION We Gambled Away The Graphix Budget		
IWTV Independent Wrestling Tag Team Championship	Bang And Matthews (August Matthews and Davey Bang)	1	January 1, 2026	291+	Worcester, Massachusetts	Wrestling Open: Back To The Beginning		
