= JCW World Championship =

Men's professional wrestling championship

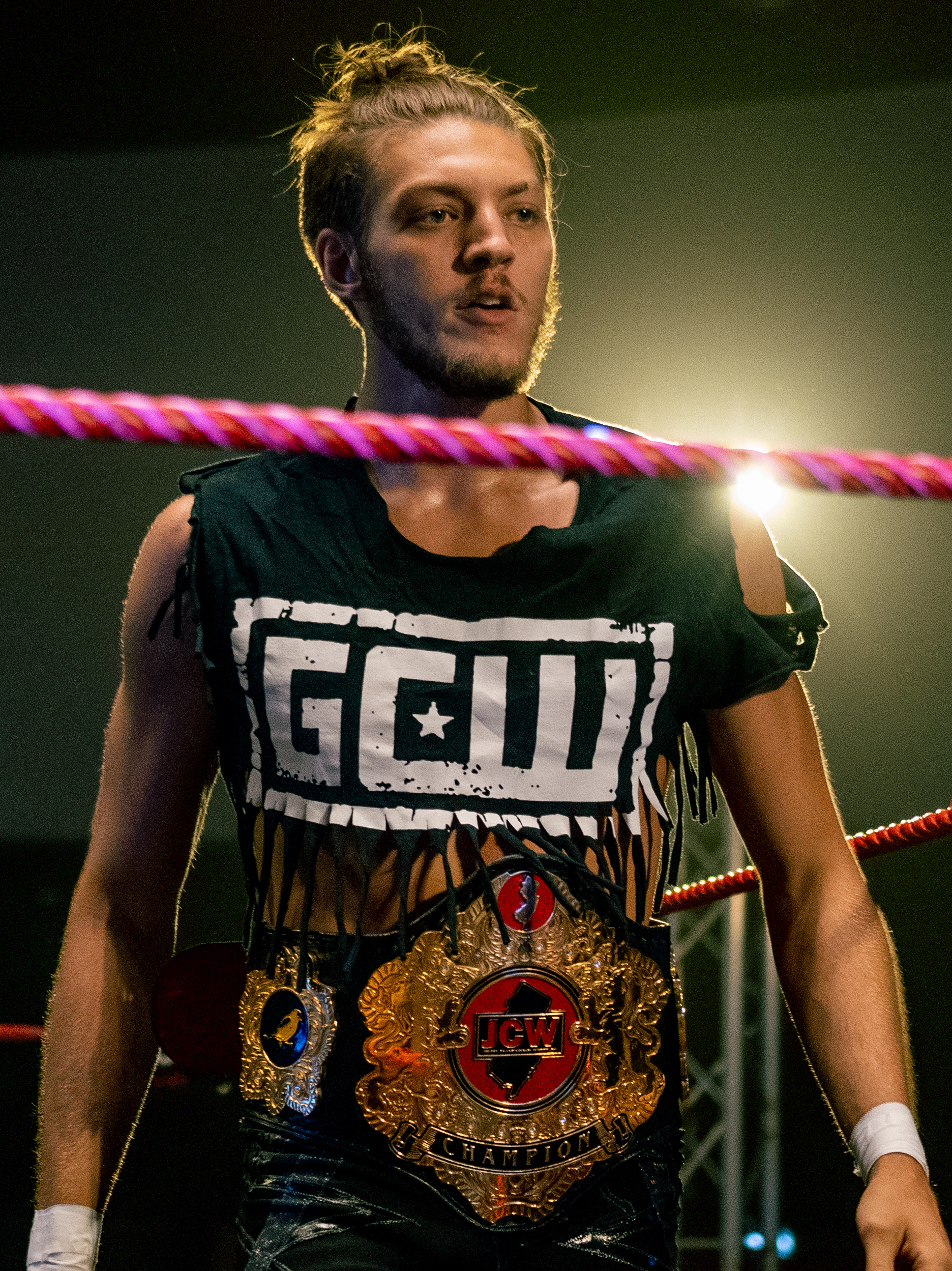
- Jordan Oliver with the current design of the title (2023–present)

Details
- Promotion: Game Changer Wrestling
- Date established: February 11, 2023
- Current champion: Gabby Forza
- Date won: October 18, 2026
Statistics
- First champion: Jordan Oliver
- Longest reign: Masha Slamovich (624 days)
- Shortest reign: Billie Starkz (104 days)
- Oldest champion: Charles Mason (32 years, 8 months and 11 days)
- Youngest champion: Billie Starkz (20 years, 10 months and 18 days)
- Heaviest champion: Charles Mason (200 lbs)
- Lightest champion: Billie Starkz (108 lbs)

The JCW World Championship is a professional wrestling world championship created and promoted by the American promotion Game Changer Wrestling (GCW). Defended on the events of GCW's developmental brand Jersey Championship Wrestling (JCW), it is one of the two world championships promoted by the promotion, alongside the GCW World Championship. The title can be won by both male and female wrestlers. The inaugural champion was Jordan Oliver. The current champion is Gabby Forza, who is in her first reign. She won the title by defeating Charles Mason at A Nightmare in Bergen County on October 18, 2026.

== Championship tournaments ==
=== Jersey J-Cup Tournament (2023) ===
First Round
Mike Bailey	Pin
Jonathan Gresham	20:59
Arez	12:38
Komander	Pin
Jack Cartwheel Marcus Mathers Yoya Dante Leon Dyln McKay	10:57
Cole Radrick	Pin
Alec Price	13:36
Blake Christian	Pin
Joey Janela	Pin
Starboy Charlie	16:34
Tony Deppen	13:25
Lio Rush	Pin
Charles Mason	Pin
Billie Starkz	14:19
Alex Shelley	17:55
Jordan Oliver	Pin

Quarterfinals
Mike Bailey	Pin
Komander	12:33
Cole Radrick	11:56
Blake Christian	Pin
Joey Janela	Pin
Lio Rush	10:20
Charles Mason	14:54
Jordan Oliver	Pin

Semifinals
Mike Bailey	Pin
Blake Christian	15:30
Joey Janela	28:56
Jordan Oliver	Pin

Final
Mike Bailey	21:25
Jordan Oliver	Pin

=== Jersey J-Cup Tournament (2024) ===
First Round
Masha Slamovich	Pin
Man Like DeReiss	14:08
Matt Makowski	27:43
Tony Deppen	Pin
Jonathan Gresham	9:40
Alec Price	Pin
Joey Janela	Pin
Kerry Morton	13:36
Nick Wayne	Pin
Marcus Mathers	17:17
The Great Sasuke	Pin
Mike Bailey	27:45
Cole Radrick Jack Cartwheel Mr. Danger Charles Mason Billie Starkz	8:48
Myron Reed	Pin
Griffin McCoy	21:05
Jordan Oliver	Pin

Quarterfinals
Masha Slamovich	Pin
Matt Makowski	10:34
Alec Price	14:18
Joey Janela	Pin
Nick Wayne	Pin
The Great Sasuke	12:58
Myron Reed	14:54
Jordan Oliver	Pin

Semifinals
Masha Slamovich	Pin
Alec Price	11:55
Nick Wayne	21:05
Jordan Oliver	Pin

Final
Masha Slamovich	TKO
Jordan Oliver	18:50

=== Jersey J-Cup Tournament (2025) ===
2025 Jersey J-Cup Tournament winner Masha Slamovich shown here with the title belt.

First Round
Masha Slamovich	Pin
Amazing Red	15:25
Marcus Mathers	Pin
Jackson Drake Jack Cartwheel	13:56
Leon Slater	Pin
Kevin Knight	12:44
Drew Parker	Pin
Rich Swann	13:46
Alec Price	Pin
Cole Radrick	17:11
Clark Connors	Pin
Arez	10:16
Atticus Cogar	Sub
Joey Janela	17:24
Sidney Akeem	Pin
Fuego Del Sol Mr. Danger Charles Mason Terry Yaki	11:29

Quarterfinals
Masha Slamovich	Pin
Marcus Mathers	12:59
Leon Slater	8:22
Drew Parker	Pin
Alec Price	Pin
Joey Janela	14:18
Atticus Cogar	10:10
Sidney Akeem	Pin

Semifinals
Masha Slamovich	Pin
Leon Slater	8:11
Alec Price	Pin
Sidney Akeem	11:44

Final
Masha Slamovich	TKO
Alec Price	18:50

=== Jersey J-Cup Tournament (2026) ===
First Round
Billie Starkz	Pin
Ryan Clancy	12:33
Oro	11:49
Man Like DeReiss	Pin
KJ Orso	Pin
Terry Yaki	10:27
Vengador	Pin
Griffin McCoy Joe Lando Joey Janela Manny Lo Travis Williams	14:53
Adam Priest	16:03
Jonathan Gresham	Pin
Darian Bengston	Pin
Judas Icarus	8:01
Alec Price	Draw
Jordan Oliver	20:00
Erick Stevens	12:29
Charles Mason	Pin

Quarterfinals
Billie Starkz	Pin
Man Like DeReiss	11:57
KJ Orso	Pin
Vengador	9:02
Jonathan Gresham	Pin
Darian Bengston	15:31
Bye
Charles Mason	N/A

Semifinals
Billie Starkz	Pin
KJ Orso	7:44
Jonathan Gresham	18:52
Charles Mason	Pin

Final
Billie Starkz	5:55
Charles Mason	Pin

== Title history ==
Like most professional wrestling championships, the title is won as a result of a scripted match. Championship matches typically occur on GCW and JCW events, though championship matches have been promoted by TNT Extreme Wrestling and other promotions on the independent circuit.

Gabby Forza is the current champion in her first reign. She won the title by defeating Charles Mason at A Nightmare in Bergen County in Ridgefield Park, New Jersey, on October 18, 2026.

Key
No.	Overall reign number
Reign	Reign number for the specific champion
Days	Number of days held
+	Current reign is changing daily

No.	Champion	Championship change			Reign statistics		Notes	Ref.
No.	Champion	Date	Event	Location	Reign	Days	Notes	Ref.
1	Jordan Oliver	February 11, 2023	Jersey J-Cup; Night 2	Jersey City, NJ	1	364	Defeated "Speedball" Mike Bailey to become the inaugural champion. This was also the finals of the 2023 Jersey J-Cup tournament.	
2	Masha Slamovich	February 10, 2024	Jersey J-Cup; Night 2	Jersey City, NJ	1	624	This was also the finals of the 2024 Jersey J-Cup tournament.	
—	Vacated	October 26, 2025	Possession	—	—	—	Masha Slamovich was stripped of the title after domestic abuse allegations were made against her by Akira.	
3	Billie Starkz	October 26, 2025	Possession	Ridgefield Park, NJ	1	104	Defeated Charles Mason to win the vacant title.	
4	Charles Mason	February 7, 2026	Jersey J-Cup; Night 2	Jersey City, NJ	1	253	This was also the finals of the 2026 Jersey J-Cup tournament.	
5	Gabby Forza	October 18, 2026	A Nightmare in Bergen County	Ridgefield Park, NJ	1	1+		

== Combined reigns ==
As of October 19, 2026.

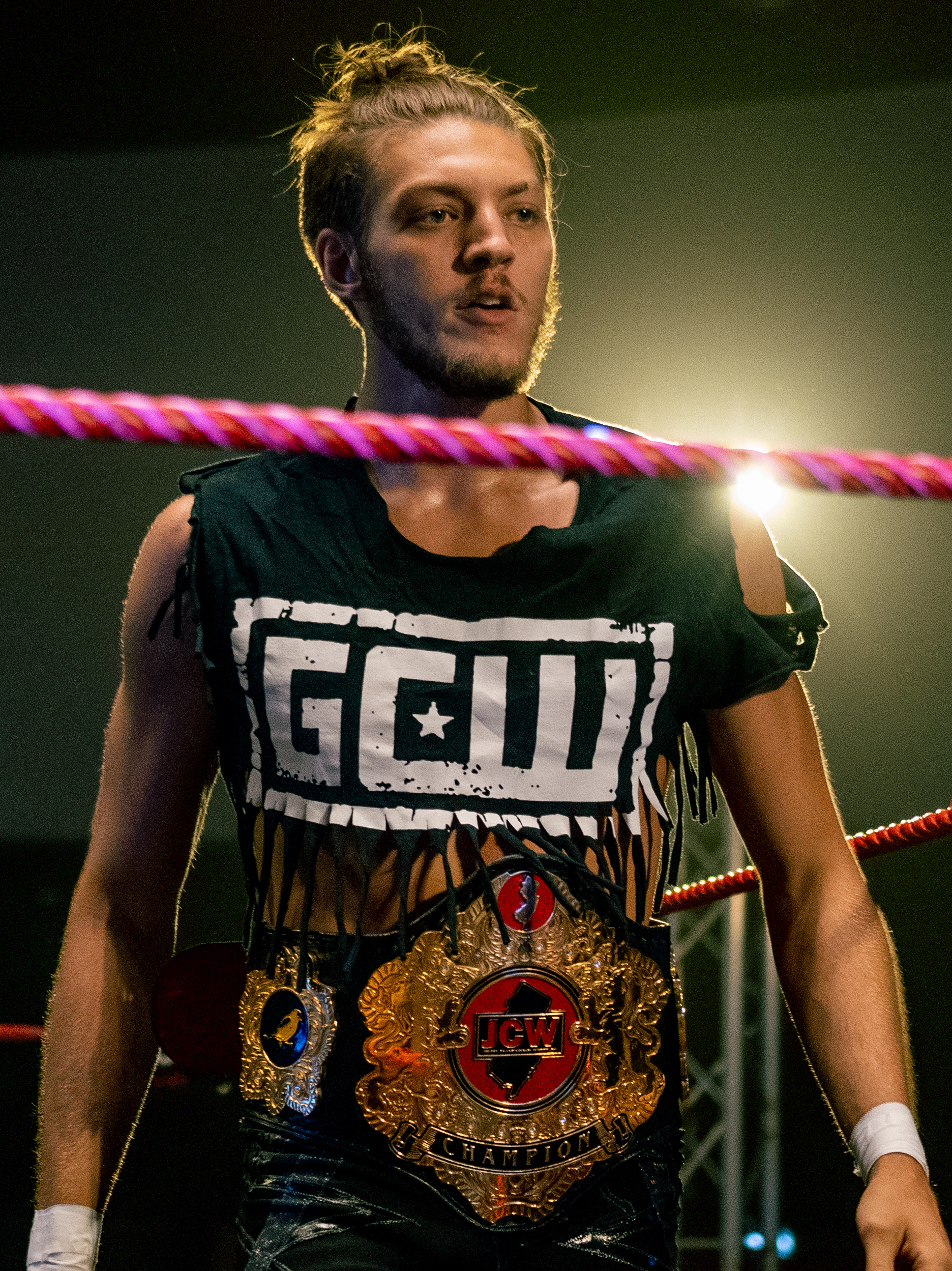
Inaugural champion Jordan Oliver.

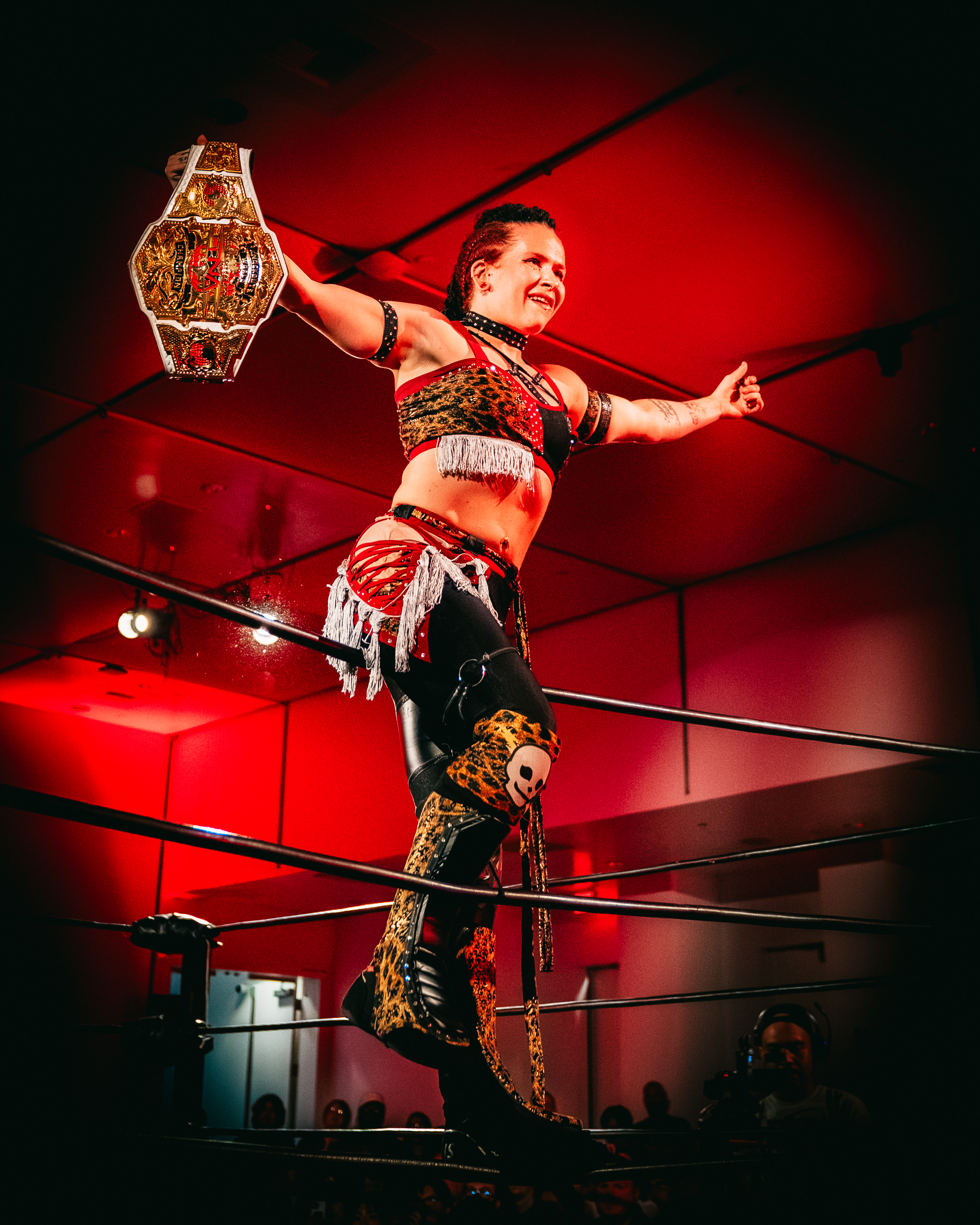
Longest-reigning champion Masha Slamovich, who also holds the record for most title defenses at 47 defenses.

†	Indicates the current champion

Rank	Wrestler	No. of reigns	Combined days
1	Masha Slamovich	1	624
2	Jordan Oliver	1	364
3	Charles Mason	1	253
4	Billie Starkz	1	104
5	Gabby Forza †	1	1+
