= RSpring Break presented by 44OH! =

2021 Game Changer Wrestling pay-per-view event

rSpring Break presented by 44OH!
- Promotional poster featuring Rickey Shane Page and Nick Gage
- Promotion: Game Changer Wrestling
- Date: April 9, 2021
- City: Tampa, Florida
- Venue: Cuban Club

Game Changer Wrestling event chronology
← Previous; Acid Cup 3	Next → Lucid Dreams

rSpring Break presented by 44OH!, initially titled Joey Janela's Spring Break 5, was a professional wrestling pay-per-view event produced by Game Changer Wrestling (GCW). The show took place on April 9, 2021 at the Cuban Club in Tampa, Florida and was streamed live on FITE TV with a kickoff show being streamed live on YouTube as part of the Collective during WrestleMania 37 weekend.

== Production ==
=== Background ===
Other on-screen personnel
Role:	Name:
Commentators	Emil Jay
Commentators	Kevin Gill
Ring announcer	Emil Jay

Since 2017, GCW has held the annual Spring Break event during WrestleMania weekend. In 2019, Spring Break was part of the inaugural Collective which featured Interspecies Wrestling (ISW), Absolute Intense Wrestling (AIW), Black Label Pro (BLP), Chikara, Blackcraft Wrestling, and International Wrestling Syndicate. Due to the COVID-19 pandemic, Joey Janela's Spring Break along with the rest of the Collective was moved to October at the Marion County Fairgrounds in Indianapolis, Indiana. On February 8, 2021, GCW announced that Joey Janela's Spring Break 5 would take place during WrestleMania 37 weekend as part of the Collective Remix in Ybor City, Florida. On March 7, 2021, due to Rickey Shane Page's victory over Joey Janela during the Take Kare pay-per-view, it was announced that the show would be renamed to rSpring Break presented by 44OH. On March 14, 2021, GCW announced that Rickey Shane Page would defend the GCW World Championship against Nick Gage during the event.

== Storylines ==
rSpring Break presented by 44OH! featured professional wrestling matches that involves different wrestlers from pre-existing scripted feuds and storylines. Wrestlers portrayed villains, heroes, or less distinguishable characters in scripted events that built tension and culminated in a wrestling match or series of matches. Storylines were produced on Game Changer Wrestling's various pay-per-view events.

== Results ==
No.	Results	Stipulations	Times
1^{P}	Treehouse Lee defeated Ninja Mack, Dante Leon, Saieve Al Sabah, Brayden Lee and Jimmy Lloyd by pinfall	Six-man scramble	6:04
2	Starboy Charlie defeated Billie Starkz by pinfall	Singles match	10:02
3	Ironbeast (KTB and Shane Mercer) defeated 44OH! (Bobby Beverly and Eric Ryan) by pinfall	Tag team match	5:54
4	Aramis, Dragón Bane and Laredo Kid defeated Arez, Black Taurus and Gringo Loco by pinfall	Six-man tag team match	13:44
5	Lio Rush defeated Jordan Oliver by pinfall	Singles match	22:22
6	Atticus Cogar defeated Masada by pinfall	Deathmatch	18:43
7	Rich Swann defeated Lee Moriarty by pinfall	Singles match	12:11
8	Joey Janela defeated Chris Dickinson by pinfall	Singles match	21:59
9	Effy defeated Gregory Iron (with Virgil) by pinfall	Singles match	5:58
10	Nick Gage defeated Rickey Shane Page (c) by pinfall	Deathmatch for the GCW World Championship	24:00
(c) / – the champion(s) heading into the match; P / – the match was broadcast on the pre-show
