= DGUSA The Rebirth =

2025 Dragon Gate USA event

The Rebirth
- Promotion(s): Dragon Gate; Dragon Gate USA
- Date: April 16, 2025
- City: Las Vegas, Nevada
- Venue: Palms Casino Resort

Dragon Gate USA events chronology
← Previous; Mercury Rising	Next → The Gate of Revolution

DGUSA The Rebirth was a professional wrestling pay-per-view event produced by Dragon Gate under the Dragon Gate USA (DGUSA) brand. The event took place on April 16, 2025 at the Palms Casino Resort in Las Vegas, Nevada in conjunction with Game Changer Wrestling's (GCW) Collective during WrestleMania 41 weekend and was streamed live on Triller TV.

== Production ==
Other on-screen personnel
Role:	Name:
Commentators	Joe Dombrowski
Commentators	Rich Bocchini

=== Background ===
Dragon Gate USA was originally established as an international branch of the Dragon Gate promotion in Japan with Satoru Oji serving as the promotion's President and former lead booker of Ring of Honor Gabe Sapolsky serving as the promotion's vice president. The promotion had featured notable names from the Dragon Gate promotion in Japan including Cima, Dragon Kid, Yamato, Shingo Takagi, Ryo Saito, Shiima Xion, and BxB Hulk alongside several American and international independent wrestlers such as Ricochet, Drew Galloway, Timothy Thatcher, Johnny Gargano, Mike Quackenbush, Soldier Ant, Fire Ant, Eddie Kingston, Jon Moxley, Bryan Danielson, Caleb Konley, Jake Crist, the Young Bucks, Sabu, and 2 Cold Scorpio. In addition to featuring wrestlers from the Dragon Gate promotion, Dragon Gate's titles were also recognized. The promotion's first event was held on July 25, 2009 titled Enter The Dragon which took place at The Arena in Philadelphia, Pennsylvania and aired on tape delay as a pay-per-view event on September 5, 2009. The promotion closed down in 2015 with its library eventually being acquired by WWE in 2020. On January 30, 2025, Dragon Gate announced the return of Dragon Gate USA with an event titled The Rebirth which would take place on April 16, 2025 at the Moon & View at the Palms Casino Resort.

=== Storylines ===
The Rebirth featured professional wrestling matches that involves different wrestlers from pre-existing scripted feuds and storylines. Wrestlers portrayed villains, heroes, or less distinguishable characters in scripted events that built tension and culminated in a wrestling match or series of matches. Storylines were produced on Dragon Gate's various events.

== Results ==
No.	Results	Stipulations	Times
1	Kzy defeated Marcus Mathers by pinfall	Singles match	10:34
2	Neo Genesis (AZM and Starlight Kid) defeated Hate (Konami and Natsuko Tora) by pinfall	Tag team match	11:36
3	Ho Ho Lun defeated Rhys Maddox by pinfall	Singles match	9:00
4	El Cucuy, La Estrella, and Ultimo Dragon defeated Sovereign (Evan Rivers, Judas Icarus, and Travis Williams) by pinfall	Six-man tag team match	6:06
5	Rich Swann and Willie Mack defeated Ben-K and Hyo and Gahbage Pail Kids (Alec Price and Jimmy Lloyd) by pinfall	Three-way tag team match	9:37
6	Paradox (Dragon Kid, Susumu Yokosuka, and Yamato) defeated Z-Brats (Ishin, Kota Minoura, and Shun Skywalker) by pinfall	Six-man tag team match	20:21
