= Yoshihiko =

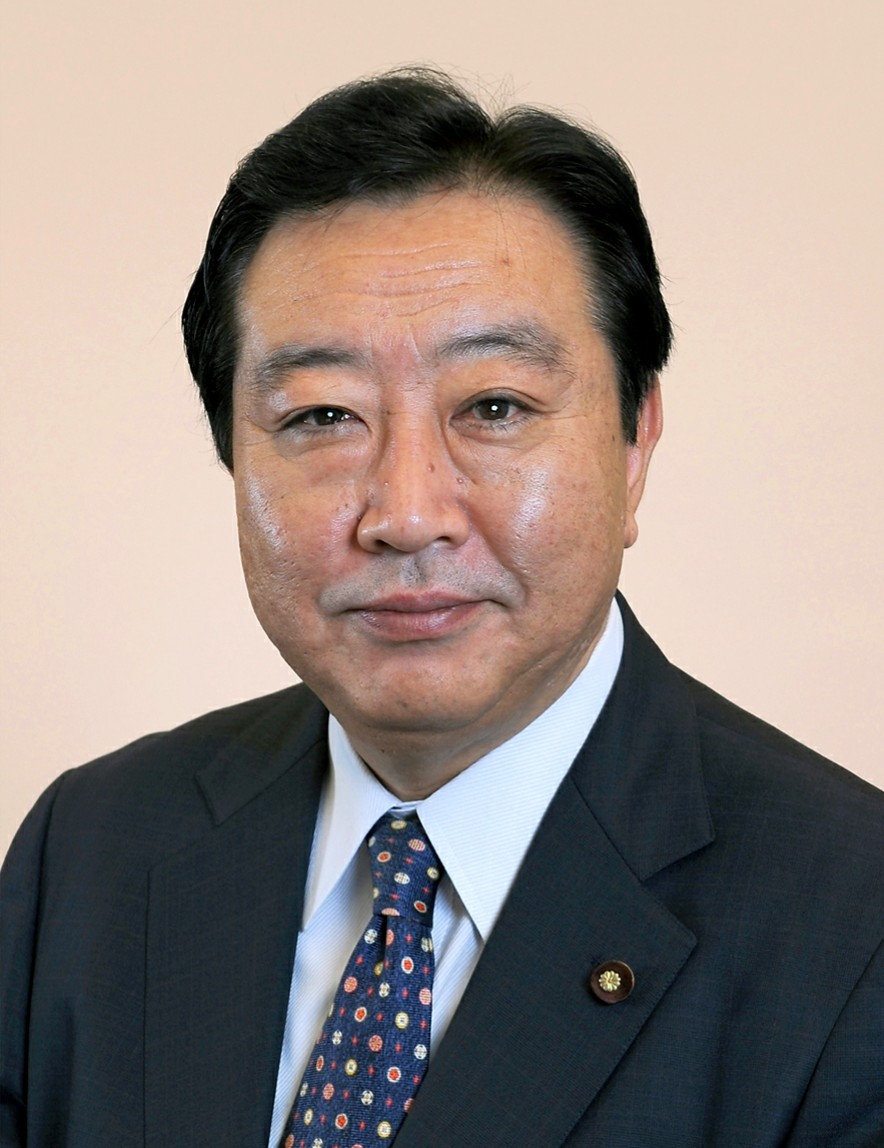
- Yoshihiko Noda, Japanese politician
- Pronunciation: joɕiçiko (IPA)
- Gender: Male
- Language: Japanese

Origin
- Meaning: Different meanings depending on the kanji used

Other names
- Alternative spelling: Yosihiko (Kunrei-shiki); Yosihiko (Nihon-shiki); Yoshihiko (Hepburn)

Yoshihiko is a masculine Japanese given name.

== Written forms ==
Yoshihiko can be written using different combinations of kanji characters, such as:

- 義彦, "justice, elegant boy"
- 義比古, "justice, young man (archaic)"
- 吉彦, "good luck, elegant boy"
- 吉比古, "good luck, young man (archaic)"
- 善彦, "virtuous, elegant boy"
- 芳彦, "virtuous/fragrant, elegant boy"
- 良彦, "good, elegant boy"
- 慶彦, "congratulate, elegant boy"
- 由彦, "reason, to rise, elegant boy"
- 与志彦, "give, determination, elegant boy"
- 嘉彦, "excellent, elegant boy"
- 佳彦, "skilled, elegant boy"

The name can also be written in hiragana as よしひこ or katakana as ヨシヒコ.

== Notable people with the name ==
- Yoshihiko Amano (天野 佳彦; born 1971), Japanese basketball player
- Yoshihiko Amino (網野 善彦; 1928–2004), Japanese Marxist historian
- Yoshihiko Fukuda (福田 良彦; born 1970), Japanese politician
- Yoshihiko Funazaki (舟崎 克彦; 1945–2015), Japanese novelist, poet, illustrator, manga artist and songwriter
- Yoshihiko Hosoda (細田 善彦), Japanese actor
- Yoshihiko Itō (伊藤 義彦; born 1951), Japanese photographer
- Yoshihiko Ito (chemist) (伊藤 嘉彦; 1937–2006), Japanese chemist
- Yoshihiko Kanatsu (金津 義彦; born 1961), Japanese fencer
- Yoshihiko Kikuchi (義彥 菊池; born 1941), emeritus general authority of The Church of Jesus
- Yoshihiko Matsui (松井 良彦; born 1956), Japanese filmmaker
- Yoshihiko Matsumoto (松本 慶彦; born 1981), Japanese volleyball player
- Yoshihiko Nikawadori (荷川取 義浩; born 1961), Japanese handball player
- Yoshihiko Noda (野田 佳彦; born 1957), Japanese politician and Prime Minister of Japan
- Yoshihiko Osaki (大崎 剛彦; 1939–2015), Japanese swimmer
- Yoshihiko Saito (斎藤 嘉彦; born 1972), Japanese hurdler
- Yoshihiko Takahashi (高橋 慶彦; born 1957), Japanese baseball player
- Yoshihiko Umakoshi (馬越 嘉彦; born 1968), Japanese animator and character designer
- Yoshihiko Yoshimatsu (吉松 義彦; 1920–1988), Japanese judoka
