= Marko Stunt =

American professional wrestler

- Stunt in August 2026

Personal information
- Born: Noah Nelms; July 30, 1996 (age 30) Paragould, Arkansas, U.S.
- Relative: Logan Stunt (brother)

Professional wrestling career
- Ring name: Marko Stunt
- Billed height: 5 ft 2 in (157 cm)
- Billed weight: 120 lb (54 kg)
- Billed from: Olive Branch, Mississippi
- Trained by: Motley Cruz
- Debut: 2015

Noah Nelms (born July 30, 1996), better known under the ring name Marko Stunt, is an American professional wrestler who currently works in Memphis Wrestling as an on-screen personality and mentor. He is best known for his time in All Elite Wrestling (AEW) and Pro Wrestling Guerrilla (PWG).

== Early life ==
Nelms was born on July 30, 1996, to Lori Nelms and former pastor and missionary Dwyndl Nelms. Growing up Nelms found interest in professional wrestling through his father. Due to his father's role as a pastor, Nelms and his family lived in several different states in the lower mid-south as well as Costa Rica and Nicaragua. Nelms graduated from Lewisburg High School in Olive Branch, Mississippi. During his later teen years, Nelms won his school's talent show and also found small success doing guitar covers on YouTube uploaded by his parents.

== Professional wrestling career ==
=== Early career (2018–2019) ===
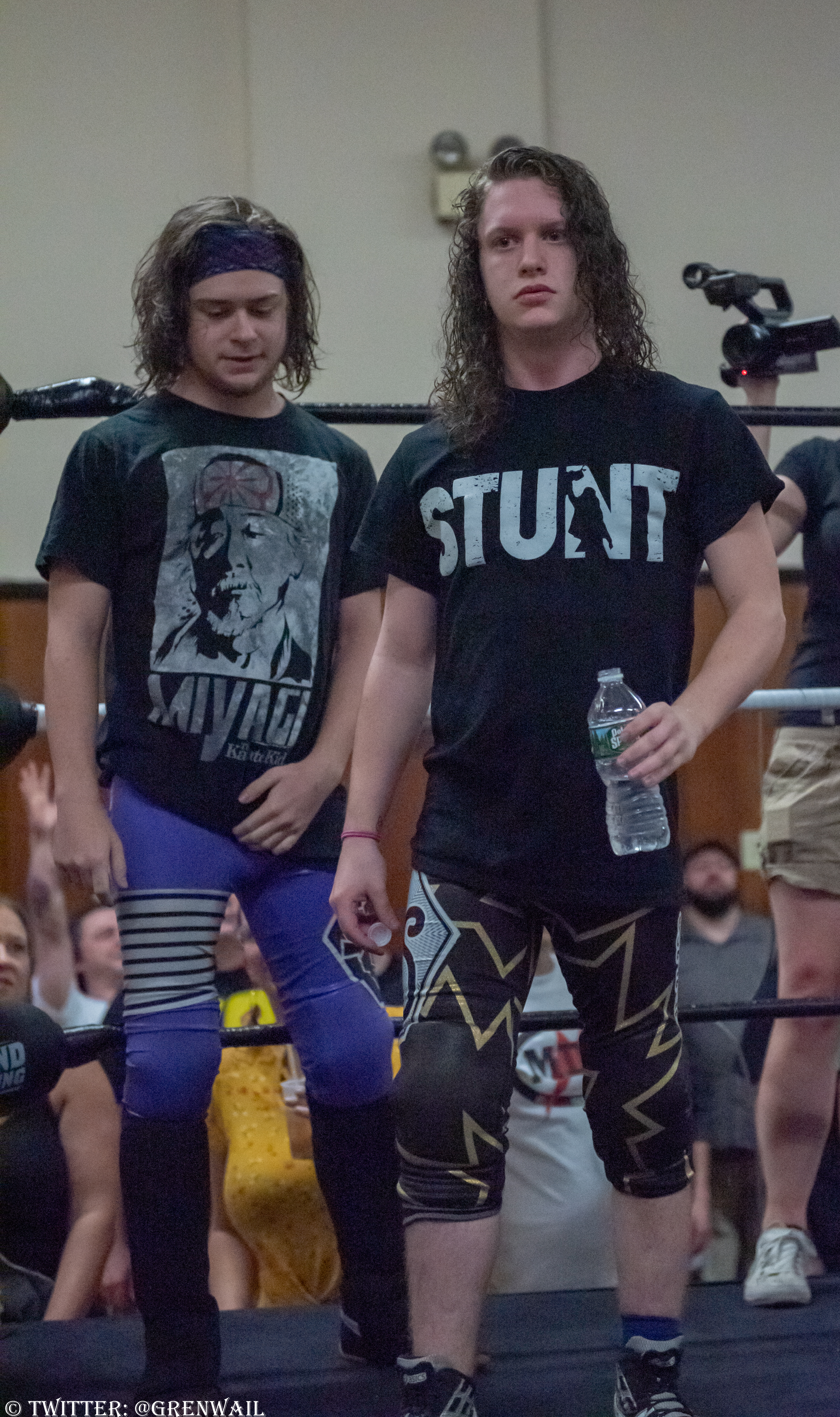
Marko (right) and his brother Logan (left)

Stunt started training when he was 18. Stunt wrestled mostly locally around Mississippi and for Cape Championship Wrestling in Missouri. In January 2018, Stunt made his debut for IWA Mid-South's 800th show losing a four-way match. At Game Changer Wrestling's Joey Janela's Lost In New York, Stunt lost to KTB; however, this exposure and his performance was popular with online wrestling fans. This performance caught the attention of Cody Rhodes and The Young Bucks who announced Stunt for All In. At All In, Stunt participated in the pre-show Over the Budget battle royal. In September 2018, Stunt competed for Pro Wrestling Guerrilla's Battle of Los Angeles where he was eliminated in the first round by Trevor Lee.

=== All Elite Wrestling (2019–2022, 2024) ===
Marko Stunt made his All Elite Wrestling debut at the inaugural AEW Double or Nothing as part of the Casino Battle Royal entering after drawing spades. He was eliminated from the ring by Ace Romero. Later it was confirmed that Stunt had signed with AEW. Stunt then aligned with Jungle Boy and Luchasaurus to form Jurassic Express. Jurassic Express were announced for the Inaugural tournament for the AEW World Tag Team Championships to take on the Lucha Brothers in the first round. Marko Stunt replaced Luchasaurus for the team due to Luchasaurus suffering a hamstring injury. However, Jungle Boy and Marko Stunt lost to the Lucha Brothers, eliminating them from the rest of the tournament. Stunt was released from AEW in June 2022.

In July 2024, Marko Stunt returned back to AEW Collision, accepting his former Jurassic Express member Jack Perry’s open challenge for the TNT Championship where he was unsuccessful against Jack. Later on, a backstage interview, Marko was interviewed but was cut short when his other former Jurassic Express member, Luchasaurus, (now Killswitch) interrupted him.

=== Indepedent circuit (2024–present) ===
In November 2024, Stunt announced his retirement from professional wrestling. On November 5, 2025, it was announced that Stunt would make his return to professional wrestling as an on-screen talent and mentor for Memphis Wrestling. At a GCW show on March 14, 2026, Stunt confirmed he was fully retired as doctors could not clear him. He then left his boots in the ring before being attacked by KJ Orso.

== Personal life ==
Nelms has a younger brother who is also a professional wrestler under the name Logan Stunt. Nelms helps run a family owned podcast called the "Stunt Family Podcast". Big Show was Nelms's favorite wrestler during his childhood, and his influences include Rey Mysterio, Kane, Chris Jericho, Eddie Guerrero and The Undertaker.

After retiring from professional wrestling the first time, Nelms began working as a car salesman for Homer Skelton Ford in Olive Branch, Mississippi.

== Championships and accomplishments ==
- Cape Championship Wrestling
  - CCW Heavyweight Championship (2 time)
  - CCW Tag Team Championship (1 time) - with Mikey McFinnegan
- DDT Pro-Wrestling
  - Ironman Heavymetalweight Championship (1 time)
- Pro Wrestling Illustrated
  - Ranked No. 182 of the top 500 singles wrestlers in the PWI 500 in 2020
- Revolution Eastern Wrestling
  - REW Pakistan 24/7 Championship (1 time)
- Scenic City Invitational
  - Futures Showcase Tournament (2018)
- Southern Underground Pro
  - SUP Bonestorm Championship (1 time)
