= AJ Gray =

American male professional wrestler (born 1994)

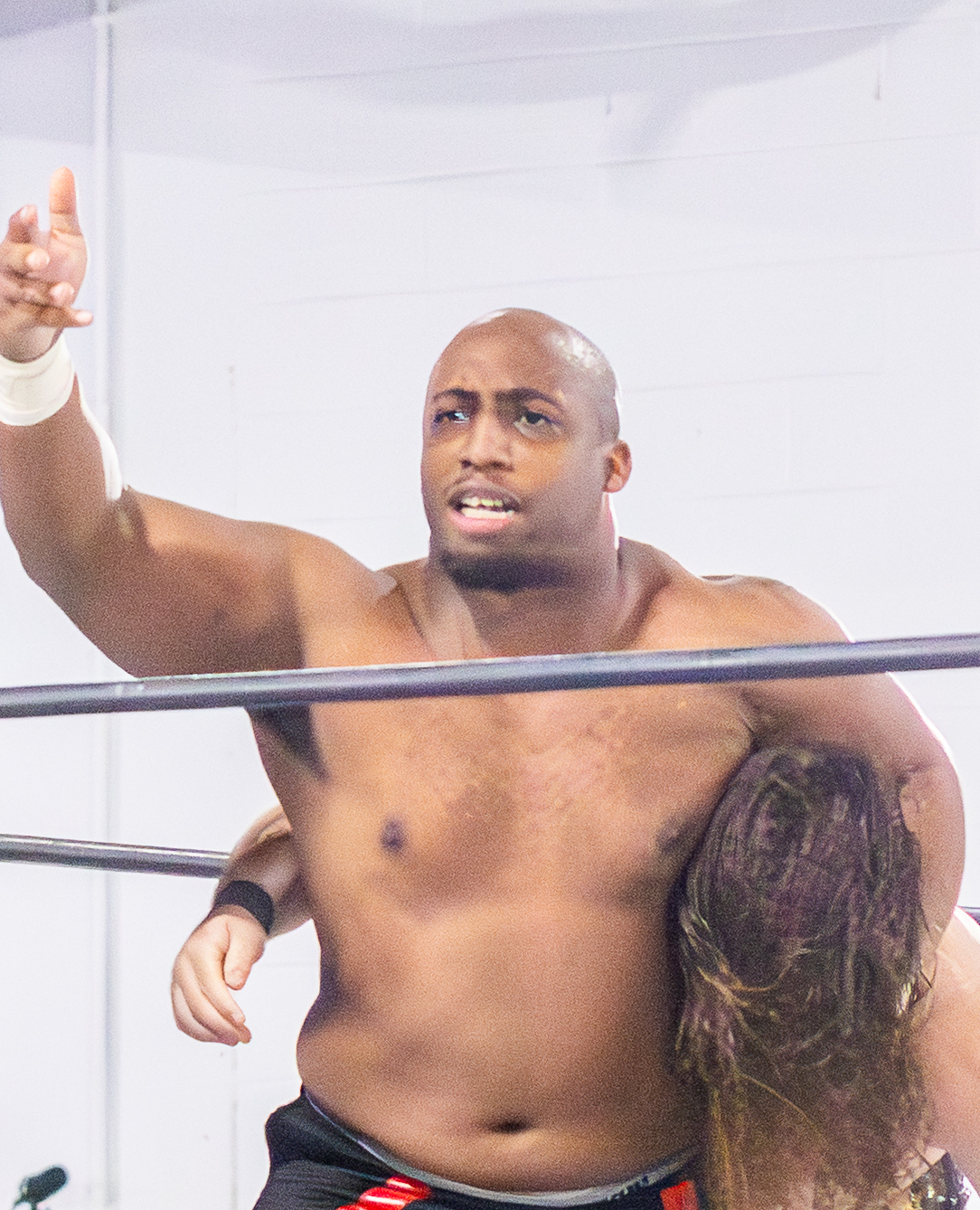
- Gray in August 2025

Personal information
- Born: 18 November 1994 (age 31) Lexington, Tennessee, United States

Professional wrestling career
- Ring name: AJ Gray
- Billed weight: 108 kg (238 lb)
- Debut: 2016

AJ Gray is an American professional wrestler, currently working as a freelancer, predominantly for Game Changer Wrestling (GCW) where he is a former one-time GCW World Champion. He also makes appearances on the American independent scene.

== Professional wrestling career ==
=== American independent circuit (2015–present) ===
Gray made his professional wrestling debut at FLW Monsters Among Us, an event promoted by Fully Loaded Wrestling on June 25, 2016, where he faced Tommy Lee Curtis and Joey Anderson in three-way competition. He is known for his tenures with various promotions from the American independent scene such as IWA Mid-South (IWA), Absolute Intense Wrestling (AIW), West Coast Pro Wrestling (WCPW) and others.

=== Game Changer Wrestling (2019–present) ===
Gray made his debut in Game Changer Wrestling at GCW They Said It Couldn't Be Done on February 16, 2019, where he competed in a six-way scramble won by Teddy Hart and also involving Facade, Grim Reefer, Jungle Boy and Orange Cassidy.

During his time with the promotion, he chased for various titles and accomplishments. At Long. Live. GCW. on December 8, 2019, Gray defeated Nick Gage to win the GCW World Championship, only to drop it to Rickey Shane Page the same night. At Say You Will on January 15, 2022, he defeated PCO to win the GCW Extreme Championship. At GCW You Only Die Once 2021 on July 10, Gray unsuccessfully challenged Alex Colon for the GCW Ultraviolent Championship. At Honor for All, an event produced by Ring of Honor which also featured GCW talent on November 14, 2021, Gray teamed up with "The Second Gear Crew" stablemate Effy to unsuccessfully challenge The Briscoe Brothers (Jay Briscoe and Mark Briscoe) for the GCW World Tag Team Championship.

Gray competed in various of the promotion's signature events. At The Wrld on GCW on January 23, 2022, he won a Grab the Brass Ring Ladder match to receive a match of their choosing at any time by defeating PCO, Alex Colon, G-Raver, Tony Deppen, Jimmy Lloyd, and Jordan Oliver Gray chose to challenge Jon Moxley for the GCW World Championship at Joey Janela's Spring Break 6 Part 1, but was unsuccessful. In the Joey Janela's Spring Break series of events, Gray made his first appearance at Spring Break 3 on April 7, 2019, where he competed in the traditional Clusterfuck Battle Royal, bout which ended in a no contest and involved notable opponents such as Joey Ryan, JTG, nWo Sting, Swoggle and others.

In the Nick Gage Invitational 5 tournament from 2020, he fell short to Masada in the first rounds.

== Championships and accomplishments ==
- Black Label Pro
  - BLP Midwest Championship (1 time)
- Capitol Wrestling
  - Catalyst Wrestling Freestyle Championship (1 time)
- Game Changer Wrestling
  - GCW World Championship (1 time)
  - GCW Extreme Championship (1 time)
  - Clusterfuck Battle Royal (2022 - with Mance Warner & Matthew Justice)
- Glory Pro Wrestling
  - Crown Of Glory Championship (1 time)
- Paradigm Pro Wrestling
  - PPW Triple Crown Championship (1 time)
- Pro Wrestling Illustrated
  - Ranked No. 49 of the top 500 singles wrestlers in the PWI 500 in 2021
- Southern Underground Pro
  - SUP Bonestorm Championship (1 time)
- Unsanctioned Pro
  - Unsanctioned Pro Hardcore Championship (1 time)
- West Coast Pro Wrestling
  - West Coast Pro Heavyweight Championship (1 time)
