= Edith Surreal =

American professional wrestler

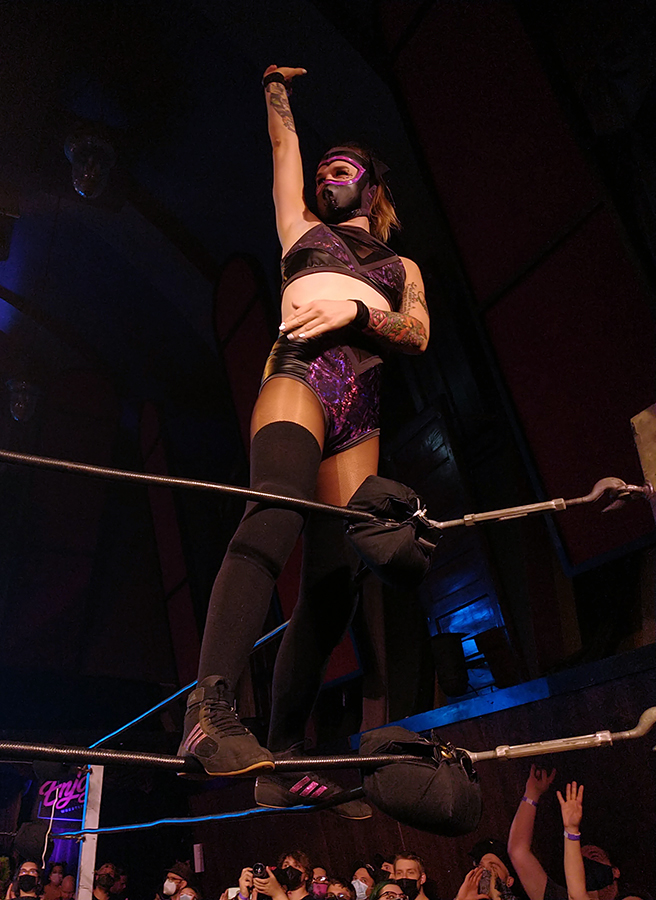
- Edith Surreal

Personal information
- Born: Philadelphia, Pennsylvania, United States

Professional wrestling career
- Ring name(s): Edith Surreal; Still Life with Apricots and Pears
- Billed height: 6 ft (183 cm)
- Billed weight: 155 lb (70 kg)
- Trained by: Drew Gulak; Orange Cassidy; Ophidian; Hallowicked; Chuck Taylor; Cheeseburger
- Debut: February 24, 2018
- Retired: June 5, 2024

Edith Surreal is the ring name of a retired American professional wrestler formerly known as Still Life with Apricots and Pears until 2021. She is perhaps best known for her tenure in Chikara. She worked for various independent professional wrestling promotions such as Game Changer Wrestling, Beyond Wrestling, and Camp Leapfrog.

== Professional wrestling career ==
Surreal began training for professional wrestling in 2017 with Chikara in her hometown of Philadelphia, Pennsylvania. There, she was trained by Drew Gulak, Ophidian, Hallowicked, Orange Cassidy, Chuck Taylor, and Cheeseburger. She made her professional wrestling debut as Still Life with Apricots and Pears at Hour Of Power 13 on February 24, 2018, where she teamed up with Ursa Minor In The Night Sky as The Nouveau Aesthetic to defeat Nytenhawk and Razerhawk. Surreal was the fifteenth holder of the Chikara Young Lions Cup after defeating Boomer Hatfield at the Young Lions Cup XV - 2nd Stage event on March 16, 2019. She worked her last match for Chikara at the National Pro Wrestling Day show on February 8, 2020, in a losing effort to Ophidian before the promotion's dissolution later that year.

After changing her name to Edith Surreal, she began working with promotions including Beyond Wrestling, Game Changer Wrestling, Enjoy Wrestling, and Camp Leapfrog. Pro Wrestling Illustrated ranked Surreal no. 192 in the top 500 singles wrestlers of 2021. Surreal's visual art-influenced wrestling style focused on submission techniques in order to make audiences "feel like this is a real struggle."

On June 5, 2024, Surreal announced that due to injury, she was putting her "in-ring wrestling career on indefinite hiatus."

== Personal life ==
Surreal came out as transgender in 2020 and has stated that she has faced exclusion due to this. She previously identified as non-binary, and uses she/her pronouns.

== Championships and accomplishments ==
- Camp Leapfrog
  - Christmas Trios (2020) — with Weber Hatfield and Shea McCoy
- Chikara
  - Chikara Young Lions Cup (1 time)
- Enjoy Wrestling
  - Enjoy Championship (1 time)
- Independent Wrestling TV
  - Cassandro Cup (2021)
- Invictus Pro Wrestling
  - Invictus Women's Championship (1 time)
- Lucha Libre and Laughs
  - LLL Women's Championship (1 time)
- Pro Wrestling Illustrated
  - Ranked No. 192 of the top 500 singles wrestlers in the PWI 500 in 2021
  - Ranked No. 140 of the top 150 female wrestlers in the PWI 500 in 2021
- Uncanny Attractions: Drags And Dropkicks
  - Unchampionship (1 time)

== Luchas de Apuestas record ==
Winner (wager)	Loser (wager)	Location	Event	Date	Notes
Edith Surreal (mask)	Ziggy Haim (hair)	Pittsburgh, Pennsylvania	Enjoy Wrestling: Night Moves	October 8, 2021	
