= Joey Janela =

American wrestler (born 1989)

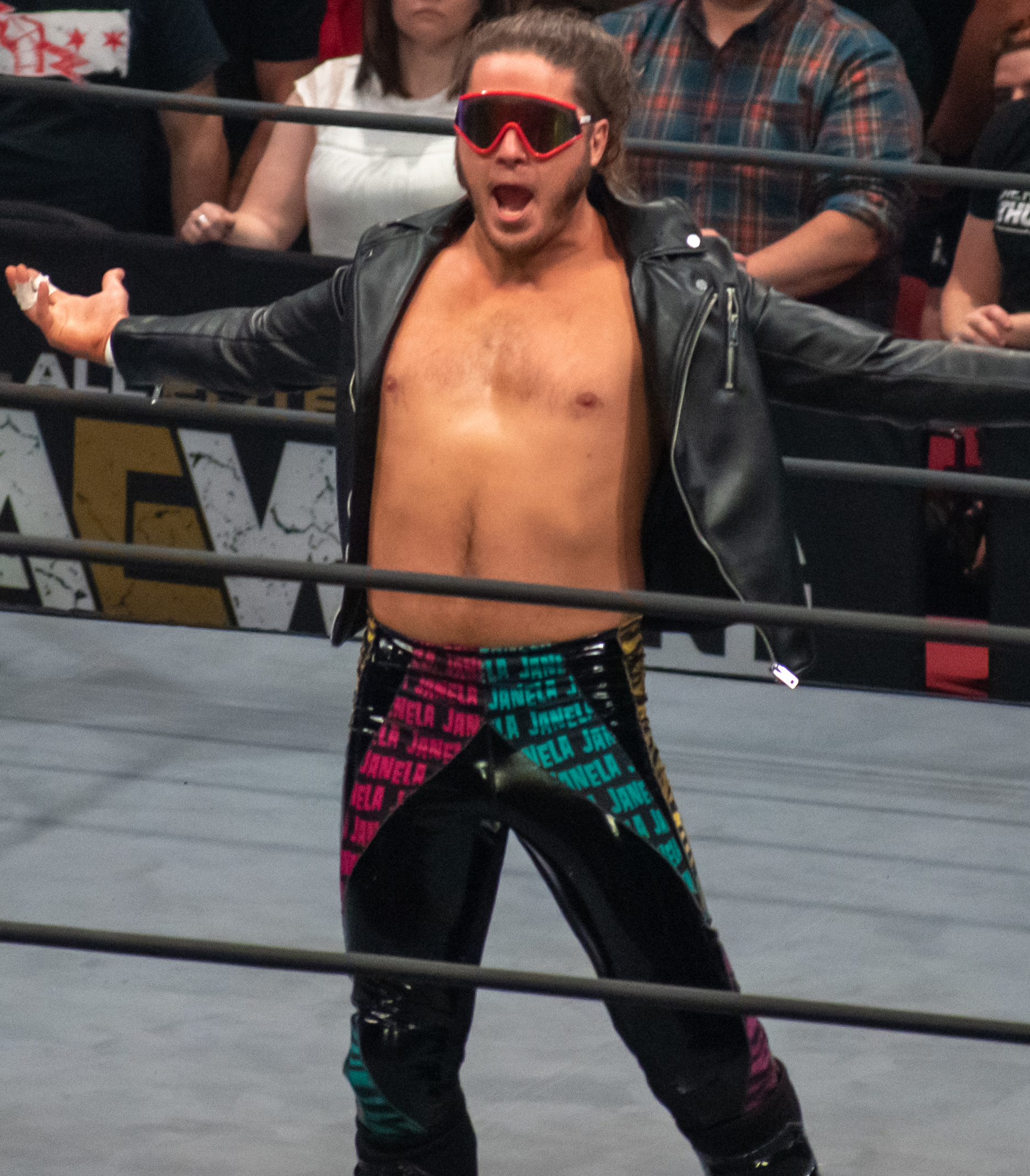
- Janela in October 2019

Personal information
- Born: Joseph Janela; July 3, 1989 (age 37) Hazlet, New Jersey, U.S.

Professional wrestling career
- Ring name(s): Joey Janela; Jelly Nutella; Kid Suicide; Starman; Bamm-Bamm
- Billed height: 5 ft 8 in (173 cm)
- Billed weight: 183 lb (83 kg)
- Billed from: Asbury Park, New Jersey
- Debut: 2006

Joseph Janela (born July 3, 1989) is an American professional wrestler, working for Game Changer Wrestling (GCW), where he is the promoter of the Joey Janela's Spring Break event series. Janela is most known for his work with All Elite Wrestling (AEW), Major League Wrestling (MLW), and various independent promotions such as Pro Wrestling Guerrilla (PWG), Combat Zone Wrestling (CZW), and Beyond Wrestling.

== Early life ==
Joseph Janela was born and raised in Hazlet, New Jersey. Janela grew up a fan of deathmatches and the extreme wrestling style that was popularized by Extreme Championship Wrestling (ECW), Combat Zone Wrestling, and the multiple other promotions that sprung up once ECW closed. According to an ESPN interview, a young Janela became enthralled with the "high-risk, high-reward style of matches" presented in hardcore wrestling. Starting at age 15, Janela began lying to professional wrestling promoters in order to start wrestling, telling them that he was of legal wrestling age and fully formally trained, which he would later admit in interviews that he was not.

== Professional wrestling career ==
=== Independent circuit (2006–present) ===
Janela made his professional wrestling debut at a 2006 National Wrestling Superstars (NWS) show where he lost in a Triple Threat match against JD Smooth and Corey Havoc. He would continue to work primarily for NWS until 2012 when he started to expand into other promotions. On March 17, 2012, World Xtreme Wrestling, a promotion ran by the Wild Samoans, booked him in a match against Brandon Scott, which Janela lost. Also in 2012, Janela started portraying the masked Starman character for Pro Wrestling Syndicate.

On August 12, 2017, at Progress Wrestling's New York City event, Janela would debut for the promotion losing to Jimmy Havoc in a No Disqualification match. At Progress Chapter 66: Mardi Graps, Janela would participate in the Thunderbastard Battle Royal, where he and other notable participants Austin Theory, Chris Brookes, and Maxwell Jacob Friedman lost to Jeff Cobb. At Progress Chapter 68, Janela would participate in the promotion's 2018 Super Strong Style 16 Tournament losing in the first round to Zack Gibson. On the last day of the tournament, Janela would defeat Jimmy Havoc in a non-tournament death match. Around this time, Janela also began wrestling for Major League Wrestling, Beyond Wrestling, DEFY Wrestling, Smash Wrestling, AAW Wrestling, and Chikara.

In September 2018, Janela suffered an injury during a match against Psicosis at a Game Changer Wrestling (GCW) event. Janela stated that MRI results showed that he suffered a complete or near complete PCL tear, a complete tear of the MCL distally, and a ACL sprain, among numerous other injuries. While recovering from his injuries, in December, Janela joined the commentary team for Mike Busey’s Sausage Castle Wrestling alongside NFL player A. J. Francis.

On March 4, 2019, Janela released a video announcing that he would be returning from his injuries at Spring Break 3. Spring Break is an annual event held by Janela, in conjunction with GCW, during WrestleMania weekend. Janela was defeated in his return match by Marko Stunt. Even prior to Spring Break 3 being held, Janela confirmed that Spring Break 4 would occur during WrestleMania 36 weekend in 2020. On May 17, 2019, Janela revealed that Spring Break 4 would be held outdoors, with a max capacity of 4,500 spectators. However, due to the COVID-19 pandemic, the event was delayed. By the time it was held in October 2020, the event was moved indoors with much more limited seating.

On June 10, 2023, Janela produced the Joey Janela's European Vacations event for the Belgian promotion BodyZoï Wrestling. In the main event, he defeated Aigle Blanc to win the BodyZoï Championship. Janela successfully defended the title against MBM on October 29 at BZW 9 in an Extreme match. Janela lost the title to Senza Volto on February 3, 2024 at BZW X.

=== Combat Zone Wrestling (2014–2018) ===
Janela made his Combat Zone Wrestling (CZW) debut as a participant in the 2014 Dojo Wars Tournament of Valor. He was defeated in the first round by Dave McCall. He would continue to wrestle on the promotion's Dojo Wars events, which were hosted at the CZW/WSU Dojo training academy and featured CZW's trainees. At Sixteen: An Ultraviolent Anniversary, Janela defeated CZW main roster wrestler Sozio to qualify for the Best of the Best 14 tournament. At Best of the Best 14, he participated in a first round Triple Threat match with CJP and Joe Gacy, which CJP won. At Proving Grounds 2015, he wrestled in another Triple Threat match, this time facing Pepper Parks and Caleb Konley. Parks won the match. At New Heights 2015, Janela faced Pepper Parks and Rich Swann in a Triple Threat match, with Parks scoring another victory over Janela. At Down with the Sickness 2015, Janela defeated Caleb Konley, Lio Rush, and Trevor Lee in a four-way match.

At Tangled Web 8, Janela defeated Tim Donst to win the CZW Wired TV Championship. As CZW Wired TV Champion, Janela successfully defended the title against Joe Gacy and Lio Rush. At Cage of Death XVII, Rush defeated Janela in a rematch to win the title. At Down with the Sickness 2016, Janela defeated Rush in a ladder match to regain the title. At Eighteen, he defeated Stockade to retain the Wired TV Championship, later successfully defending the title against Maxwell Jacob Friedman at The Wolf of Wrestling. At Cage of Death 19, Janela lost the championship to Friedman. At Best of the Best 17, Janela lost in the first round to Joe Gacy in a four-way match that also involved Brandon Kirk and Rich Swann. This would be Janela's last CZW match as he announced later in 2018 that he had quit the promotion.

=== Pro Wrestling Guerrilla (2017–2019) ===
In 2017, Janela made his Pro Wrestling Guerilla (PWG) debut as a participant in PWG's Battle of Los Angeles tournament, where he lost in the first round to Sammy Guevara. That same year, he would participate on the All Star Weekend 13 events, defeating Trevor Lee on night 1. On night 2, he was defeated by Marty Scurll. At Mystery Vortex V in 2018, he would defeat Flash Morgan Webster. At Neon Knights, he would lose to Dalton Castle. Janela participated in the promotion's 2018 All Star Weekend, losing to Jonah Rock on night 1. He would win his match on night 2, defeating Robbie Eagles. At Threemendous V, Janela was defeated by Jeff Cobb. Janela participated in the 2018 Battle of Los Angeles tournament, where he won his first two tournament matches. He defeated David Starr in the first round and Cima in the second round before being eliminated in the semi-finals by Bandido.

=== All Elite Wrestling (2019–2022) ===
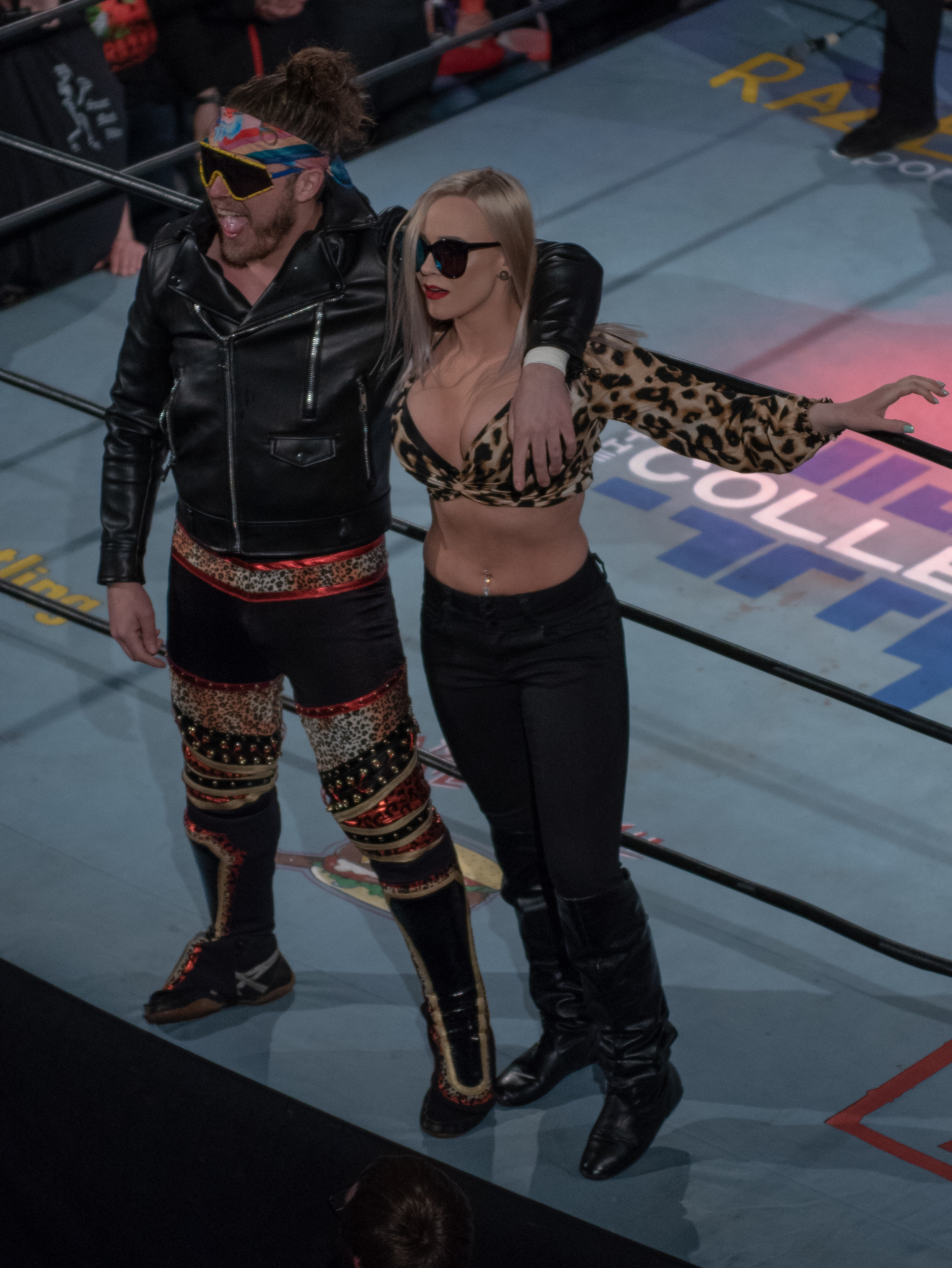
Janela alongside Penelope Ford in 2019

In January 2019, it was revealed that Janela would be one of the first signees to All Elite Wrestling (AEW), a new wrestling promotion started by sports executive Tony Khan and wrestlers Cody and The Young Bucks. It was later revealed that Janela had signed a three-year deal with the promotion. His deal allowed him to still work independent wrestling dates.

He debuted for AEW at their inaugural pay-per-view event Double or Nothing on May 25, where he competed in the pre-show Casino Battle Royale, but the match was won by "Hangman" Adam Page. At Fyter Fest in June, Janela lost to Jon Moxley in the main event unsanctioned match. The following month at Fight for the Fallen, Janela teamed with Darby Allin and Jimmy Havoc in a losing effort to Shawn Spears, MJF, and Sammy Guevara. After the match, the three men would blame each other for the loss and brawl backstage. Subsequently, a three-way match was arranged for All Out on August 31, which Havoc won. On the October 22 episode of Dark, Janela picked up his first win in AEW, with a victory over Brandon Cutler.

He would then start a feud with Shawn Spears, after Janela had disrespected Spears' manager Tully Blanchard. At Full Gear on November 9, Janela faced Spears in a losing effort. On the December 4 episode of Dynamite, Janela faced Jon Moxley in a rematch from Fyter Fest, which he also lost. At Double or Nothing on May 23, 2020, Janela competed in the Casino Ladder Match, which was won by the debuting Brian Cage. Janela's AEW contract expired on May 1, 2022.

=== DDT Pro-Wrestling (2022–present) ===
On June 19, 2022, DDT Pro-Wrestling (DDT) announced that Janela would be making his DDT debut in August. In his debut on August 14, Janela defeated Akito in a fluorescent light tube ippon death match to win the DDT Extreme Championship. On August 20, he defeated Shunma Katsumata in a hardcore match at Wrestle Peter Pan 2022 to retain the title. On October 9, at night 2 of GCW's Fight Club event, Janela defeated Cole Radrick in a winner takes all match to retain his DDT title and win Radrick's GCW Extreme Championship, in the process becoming the first person to hold the DDT and GCW Extreme Championships simultaneously. On December 4, at D-Oh Grand Prix 2022, Janela lost the DDT Extreme Championship to Jun Akiyama in a tables, ladders, and chairs match. On April 4, 2023, Janela teamed with DDT president Sanshiro Takagi and Takeshi Masada to face Atsushi Onita, Shunma Katsumata, and Toi Kojima in an exploding barbed wire bat death match where Janela's team was defeated.

== Personal life ==
Janela dated wrestler Penelope Ford on and off for four years, before the two broke up in late 2018.

Janela is in a relationship with AEW wrestler Megan Bayne.

== Championships and accomplishments ==
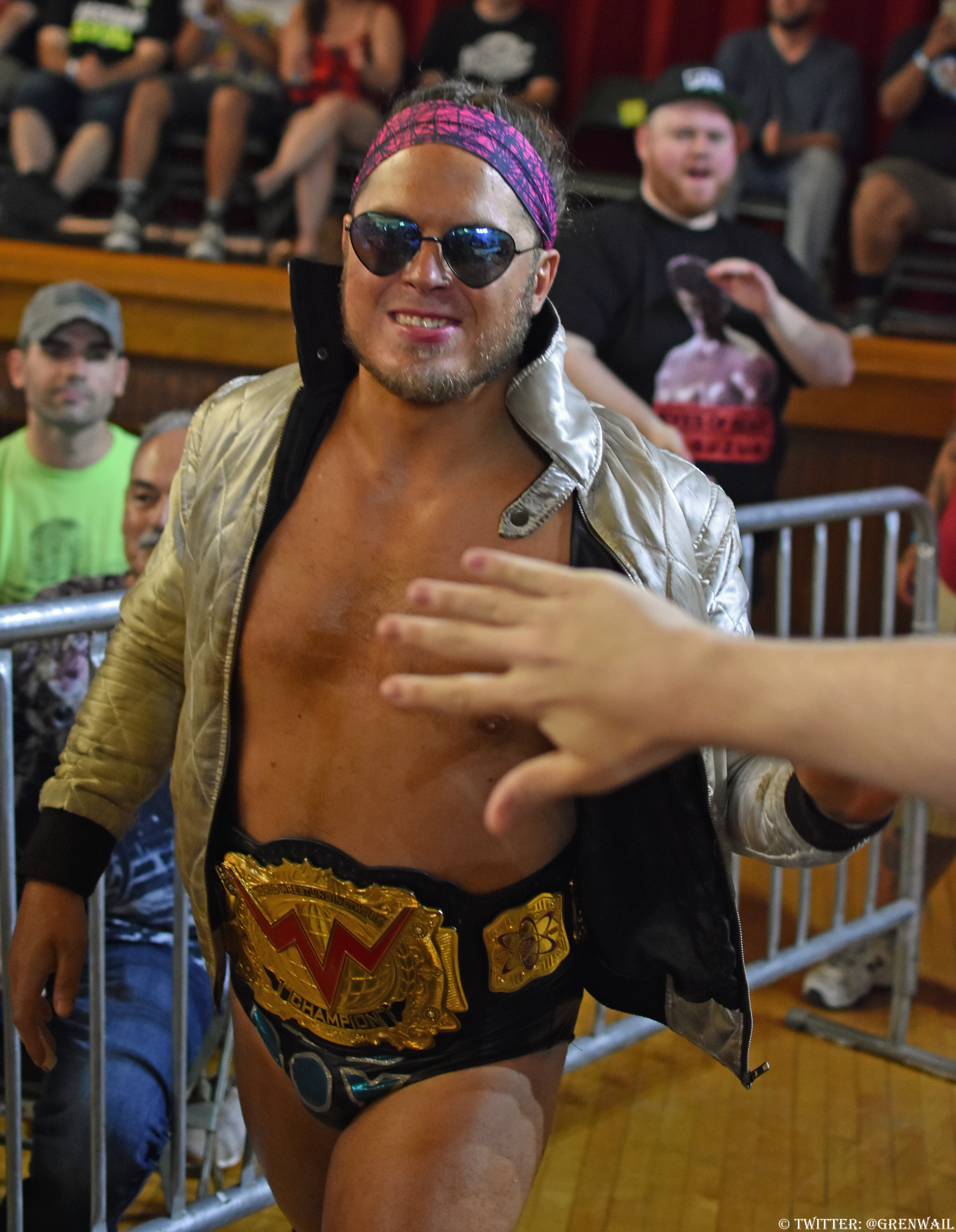
Janela as WWN Champion in 2018

- Absolute Intense Wrestling
  - AIW Intense Championship (1 time)
  - JT Lightning Memorial Tournament (2018)
- Alpha-1 Wrestling
  - A1 Outer Limits Championship (1 time)
- BodyZoï Wrestling/Banger Zone Wrestling
  - BodyZoï Championship/BZW Championship (1 time)
- Combat Zone Wrestling
  - CZW Wired TV Championship (3 times)
- DDT Pro-Wrestling
  - DDT Extreme Championship (1 time)
  - Ironman Heavymetalweight Championship (5 times)
- Dojo Pro Wrestling
  - Dojo Pro White Belt Championship (1 time)
- Fight Factory Wrestling
  - Fight Factory Premier Championship (1 time)
- Forza Lucha!
  - Forza Lucha Cup Championship (1 time)
- Game Changer Wrestling/Jersey Championship Wrestling
  - JCW Championship/GCW World Championship (2 times)
  - JCW Tag Team Championship (2 times) – with Rhett Titus (1 time) and with Sean Waltman (1 time)
  - GCW Extreme Championship (1 time)
  - Tag Team Jersey J-Cup (2014) – with Rhett Titus
  - The Acid Cup 1 (2016)
- Greektown Pro Wrestling
  - Greektown Wrestling Championship (1 time)
  - Greektown Cup Championship (1 time, current)
- Hoodslam
  - Hoodslam Champion Ship Championship (1 time)
- House of Glory
  - HOG Tag Team Championship (1 time) – with Anthony Gangone
- Lucha Libre Vanguardia
  - Vanguardia Extraordinario Championship (1 time, current)
- National Wrestling Superstars
  - NWS Cruiserweight Championship (3 times)
- On Point Wrestling
  - OPW Heavyweight Championship (1 time)
- Pro Wrestling Illustrated
  - Ranked No. 98 of the top 500 singles wrestlers in the PWI 500 in 2025
- Pro Wrestling Unplugged
  - PWU Legacy Championship (1 time, current)
- Pro Wrestling Syndicate
  - PWS Suicidal Six Way Championship/PWS Tri State Championship (3 times)
- Revolution Eastern Wrestling
  - REW Pakistan Championship (1 time)
- WWNLive
  - WWN Championship (1 time)
- World Xtreme Wrestling
  - WXW Blast Television Championship (1 time)
- WrestlePro
  - WrestlePro Tag Team Championship (1 time) – with Brian Myers
