= The People vs. GCW (2025) =

2025 Game Changer Wrestling pay-per-view event

- Promotional poster
- Promotion: Game Changer Wrestling
- Date: January 19, 2025
- City: New York City, New York
- Venue: Hammerstein Ballroom

Game Changer Wrestling event chronology
← Previous; Thank Me Later	Next → Enter The Zone

The People vs. GCW 2025 was a professional wrestling pay-per-view event produced by Game Changer Wrestling (GCW). The show took place on January 19, 2025 at the Hammerstein Ballroom in New York City and was streamed live on Triller TV with a kickoff show being streamed live on YouTube. The show also featured wrestlers from the independent circuit and Juggalo Championship Wrestling (JCW).

== Production ==
=== Background ===
On September 14, 2024, at Game Changer Wrestling's Bad One pay-per-view in Detroit, Violent J of Insane Clown Posse made an appearance during a six-man tag team consisting of 2 Tuff Tony, Breyer Wellington, and Mad Man Pondo, who Violent J had accompanied, against Thrunt (1 Called Manders, Dark Sheik, and Effy) in a six man tag team match. Despite losing the match, Violent J issued a challenge to GCW to a "2 day war" at the Gathering of the Juggalos the following year. On November 15, 2024, Mance Warner defended the GCW World Championship against 2 Tuff Tony during the Chaos in Kentucky pay-per-view in Louisville, Kentucky.

=== Storylines ===
The People vs. GCW featured professional wrestling matches that involves different wrestlers from pre-existing scripted feuds and storylines. Wrestlers portrayed villains, heroes, or less distinguishable characters in scripted events that built tension and culminated in a wrestling match or series of matches. Storylines were produced on Game Changer Wrestling's various pay-per-view events.

=== Aftermath ===
After PCO had won the rumble match, he proceeded to destroy the TNA Digital Media Championship and attempted to cut a promo against Total Nonstop Action Wrestling (TNA), the promotion which promotes the TNA Digital Media Championship before the feed for the kickoff show was abruptly cut. Dave Meltzer of the Wrestling Observer had suggested that PCO was disgruntled due to TNA having revoked a contract offer which they asked for him to lose the championship in his final appearance with the promotion. Following the incident, PCO was removed from TNA's roster page and the Digital Media Championship was stripped from him.

During a GCW World Championship #1 contendership match against Effy, Allie Katch suffered an ankle injury after diving from the ring. The show would be put on pause by the New York State Athletic Commission to allow for medical personnel to bring Katch backstage and later to a local hospital for medical attention. Katch would not return to the ring until November 1, 2025 when she teamed up with Effy in a tag team match against None More Violent (CHO and Jinn Hallows) at F1RST Wrestling's Unleashed show in Minneapolis, Minnesota.

After Joey Janela defeated Masato Tanaka, Sabu made a surprise appearance to challenge Janela at Joey Janela's Spring Break 9 in Paradise, Nevada. However, the match would be Sabu's final match before retiring from professional wrestling.

== Results ==
No.	Results	Stipulations	Times
1^{P}	1 Called Manders defeated Blake Christian, Fuego Del Sol, Marcus Mathers, Mr. Danger, Rich Swann	Scramble match	11:03
2^{P}	PCO defeated 2 Tuff Tony (with Violent J), Aerial Van Go, Austin Luke, Bam Sullivan, Big Vin, Bobby Flaco, Brian Morris, Brooke Havok, Charlie Tiger, CPA, Crowbar, Drew Blood, Dyln McKay and Facade, Frightmare, Goldy, Jay Lucas, Jeffrey John, JP Grayson (with Violent J), Marc Angel, Rob Shit, Sam Stackhouse, Shane Mercer, Sleepy Ed and Starboy Charlie, Terry Yaki, Titus Alexander, and Tommy Grayson (with Violent J), Zayda Steel by eliminating Shane Mercer	Rumble match	15:45
3	Matt Tremont defeated Maki Itoh (c), Brandon Kirk, Ciclope, Dr. Redacted, Drew Parker, John Wayne Murdoch, Matthew Justice, and Rina Yamashita by pinfall	Doors, ladders, and chairs match to unify the GCW Extreme Championship and the GCW Ultraviolent Championship	15:55
4	Effy defeated Allie Katch by referee decision	Singles match to determine the #1 contender for the GCW World Championship	4:35
5	The New York OG's (Amazing Red, Grim Reefer, Homicide) (with Julius Smokes) defeated The Real F'n Pros (Griffin McCoy, Kerry Morton, and Tony Deppen) by pinfall	Six man tag team match	11:05
6	Gahbage Daddies (Alec Price and Cole Radrick) defeated Violence is Forever (Dominic Garrini and Kevin Ku) (c) by pinfall	Tag team match for the GCW Tag Team Championship	14:28
7	Charles Mason defeated Richard Holliday (with Parrow) by pinfall	Steel cage match	12:17
8	Sidney Akeem (with Malik Bosede and Nick Holiday) defeated El Hijo del Vikingo by pinfall	Singles match	10:33
9	Los Desperados (Arez, Gringo Loco, and Jack Cartwheel) defeated Little Guido, Super Crazy, and Tajiri by pinfall	Six man tag team match	12:35
10	Josh Barnett defeated Tom Pestock by pinfall	Bloodsport match	9:57
11	Megan Bayne defeated Atticus Cogar by pinfall	Singles match	13:49
12	Joey Janela defeated Masato Tanaka by pinfall	Singles match	12:38
13	Matt Cardona (with Broski Jimmy) defeated Tommy Invincible by pinfall	Singles match	1:44
14	Matt Cardona (with Broski Jimmy) defeated Microman by pinfall	Singles match	1:31
15	Jimmy Lloyd defeated Matt Cardona by pinfall	Singles match	2:12
16	Effy defeated Mance Warner (c) by pinfall	Singles match for the GCW World Championship	19:07
(c) / – the champion(s) heading into the match; P / – the match was broadcast on the pre-show
