= Limitless Wrestling =

American professional wrestling promotion

- Acronym: Limitless
- Founded: 2015
- Style: Professional wrestling
- Headquarters: Portland, Maine, United States
- Founder: Randy Carver
- Owner: Randy Carver
- Website: limitlesswrestling.com

Limitless Wrestling (Limitless), is an independent professional wrestling promotion headquartered in Maine.

== History ==
On September 12, 2015, Limitless Wrestling held its first event title Stage One at the City Side Restaurant & Banquet Hall in Brewer, Maine. The main event match of the show was Ace Romero fighting against Alex Mason. On May 11, 2018, Limitless held its first streamed event when they presented Feed The Need at the Portland Club in Portland, Maine which was aired on tape delay on Powerbomb TV on December 21, 2018.

On December 1, 2018, Limitless held its first cross-promotional event with Blitzkrieg! Pro titled Blitzkrieg! vs. Limitless in Enfield, Connecticut. On January 19, 2019, the promotion crowned its first champion during the promotion's Let's Wrestle Volume 4: Let's Rumble! event at American Legion Post #84 in Orono, Maine when Davienne was crowned the first Let's Wrestle Champion after winning a battle royal. On August 17, 2019, the promotion the first Limitless World Champion when MJF won a four-way match to determine the inaugural Limitless World Champion during the Welcome to the Dance event in Westbrook, Maine.

On November 29, 2019, the promotion held its first live broadcast event at Yarmouth AmVets Post #2 in Yarmouth, Maine which was streamed live on IndependentWrestling.tv. Titled Twilight Zone, the main event of the show was Ashley Vox fighting against Kris Statlander in a Last Creature Standing match. On October 7, 2022 and October 8, 2022, Limitless teamed up with Blitzkrieg! Pro to present the promotion's second joint show titled Blitzkrieg! vs. Limitless 2.

On November 8, 2025, Limitless held its first pay-per-view event when they teamed up with Game Changer Wrestling to present Massacare in Maine which was also GCW's first event in the state with the main event being between the team of Atticus Cogar, Kerry Morton, and KJ Orso going up against Effy, Joey Janela, and Ricky Morton in a six-man tag team match. The show also featured Effy defending the GCW World Championship against Ricky Morton. On January 16, 2025, during the Limitless Rumble at the Colisée in Lewiston, Maine, MJF defended the AEW World Championship against Alec Price who was one half of the GCW Tag Team Champions. After the match, it was announced that Price and his tag team partner Jordan Oliver had been signed to All Elite Wrestling.

Laynie Luck also defended the WWE Women's ID Championship against B3CCA and the main event was a Limitless World Championship #1 Contendership Rumble match in which Gabby Forza became the #1 contender for the Limitless World Championship. On June 14, 2026, Limitless announced a partnership agreement with AEW to host and simulcast their content on the MyAEW streaming service.

== Championships ==
=== Current championships ===
Championship	Current champion(s)	Date won	Days held	Event	Location	Notes
Limitless World Championship	Gabby Forza	August 8, 2026	35+	Limitless Vacationland Cup 2026	Portland, Maine	
Let's Wrestle Tag Team Championship	Classic Corps (Dave Dyer and Kalvin Strange)	February 2, 2025	587+	Let's Wrestle Sunday Night Showdown	Milford, Maine	

=== Former championships ===
Championship	Last champion(s)	Date won	Days held	Event	Location	Notes
Let's Wrestle Championship	Channing Thomas	July 20, 2024	1	Crunch Time 2024	Yarmouth, Maine	
