= Alex Colon =

American professional wrestler (born 1984)

- Colon in July 2020

Personal information
- Born: November 18, 1984 (age 42) Hammonton, New Jersey, U.S.

Professional wrestling career
- Billed height: 171 cm (5 ft 7 in)
- Billed weight: 86 kg (190 lb)
- Trained by: Combat Zone Wrestling; D. J. Hyde; Jon Dahmer
- Debut: 2007

Alex Colon (born November 18, 1984) is an American professional wrestler best known for his tenures with Combat Zone Wrestling (CZW) and Game Changer Wrestling (GCW) where he predominantly performed in deathmatches.

== Professional wrestling career ==
=== Combat Zone Wrestling (2007–2018; 2025–present) ===
Colon made his professional wrestling debut in Combat Zone Wrestling at CZW Chris Cash Memorial Show on September 8, 2007, where he unsuccessfully faced LJ Cruz and Joe Gacy in three-way competition.

During his decade-long first tenure with the promotion, he chased for various accomplishments and competed mainly as part of the The Blackout stable.. He competed in the inaugural tournament of the CZW Wired Championship in which he fell short to Joe Gacy in the first rounds. He eventually won the title four years later at Down With The Sickness on September 14, 2013, after winning a four way ladder match also involving reigning champion A. R. Fox, Andrew Everett and Shane Strickland. At CZW A Tangled Web V on August 11, 2012, Colon unsuccessfully challenged A.R. Fox for the CZW Junior Heavyweight Championship.

Colon competed in various of the promotion's signature events. In the CZW Cage of Death series, he made his first appearance at Cage of Death IX on December 8, 2007, where he teamed up with "GNC" tag team partner Joe Gacy and Nicky Benz in a losing effort against 2 Girls, 1 Cup (Beef Wellington and Greg Excellent) and LJ Cruz. At Cage of Death XIV on December 8, 2012, he teamed up with "4Loco" stablemates Azrieal and Bandido Jr.to help them defend the CZW World Tag Team Championship in a six-man tag team match against The Nation of Intoxication (Danny Havoc, Devon Moore and Lucky 13) from which they came out unsuccessfully. Colon was not recognized as a champion.

In the CZW Tournament of Death, Colon made his first appearance at the 2012 Tournament of Death: Europe edition which also featured qualification matches for Westside Xtreme Wrestling's 2013 16 Carat Gold Tournament, falling short to Jonathan Gresham in one of the bouts.

In the CZW Best of the Best series of events, Colon made his first appearance at the 11th edition in which he defeated Greg Excellent and Willie Mack in a three-way quarterfinal, then fell short to Sami Callihan in the semifinals. He scored his best result at the 12th edition which he won, by defeating Shane Strickland and Rich Swann in the quarterfinals, Jonathan Gresham in the semifinals, and A.R. Fox in the finals.

After a seven-year hiatus with the promotion, Colon returned at CZW 26th Anniversary on February 22, 2025, where he fell short to Nick Gage in a deathmatch.

=== Game Changer Wrestling (2017–2022) ===
Colon made his Game Changer Wrestling debut at GCW Ready To Die 2017: The 2nd Anniversary on December 16, where he defeated G-Raver in singles competition.

Colon competed in several signature events of the promotion. In the Nick Gage Invitational series, he scored his best results at "Invitational 4", in which he made it to the finals, where he unsuccessfully challenged Nick Gage himself for the GCW World Championship in a four-way deathmatch also involving Mance Warner and Yuko Miyamoto, and in "Invitational 6", edition which he won by defeating Masashi Takeda in a match which was also disputed for the latter's GCW Ultraviolent Championship. Colon was also the inaugural Ultraviolent Champion, title which he initially won by defeating Lucky 13 at GCW Planet Death on April 10, 2021. He dropped the title to Drew Parker at GCW Homecoming Weekend on July 24, 2021, in a match also disputed for Parker's BJW Deathmatch Heavyweight Championship. At GCW The Art of War on September 3, 2022, Colon teamed up with his "Mega Bastards" tag team partner John Wayne Murdoch and won the GCW Tag Team Championship in a five-way WarGames match by defeating reigning champions The Briscoes (Jay Briscoe and Mark Briscoe), and the teams of BUSSY (Allie Katch and Effy), Los Macizos (Ciclope and Miedo Extremo) and The Second Gear Crew (Mance Warner and Matthew Justice).

=== Wrestling Revolver (2017–present) ===
Another promotion in which Colon is regularly competing is Wrestling Revolver. He is a former two-time Revolver World Tag Team Champion, titles which he won alonsgide "R.E.D" stablemates Steve Maclin and RSP on two separate occasions, first at REVOLVER Redemption 2023 on October 9, and secondly at Revolver Tales from the Ring on September 21, 2024. He competed for several other titles such as the Revolver World Championship, ccomplishment for which he wrestled at Cage of Horrors on August 15, 2026, where he fought in a four-way Cage of Horrors match, coming unsuccessful against Mance Warner, Damian Chambers and Krule.

== Championships and accomplishments ==
- Combat Zone Wrestling
  - CZW Wired Championship (1 time)
  - CZW Best of the Best (2013)
- Desastre Total Ultraviolento
  - DTU Alto Impacto Championship (1 time)
- Game Changer Wrestling
  - GCW Tag Team Championship (1 time) – with John Wayne Murdoch
  - GCW Ultraviolent Championship (3 times, inaugural)
  - Nick Gage Invitational 6 (2021)
- H2O Wrestling: Hardcore Hustle Organization
  - H2O Heavyweight Championship (2 times)
- Pro Wrestling Illustrated
  - Ranked No. 211 of the top 500 singles wrestlers in the PWI 500 in 2022
- Rockstar Pro Wrestling
  - Rockstar Pro Intergalactic Championship (1 time)
  - Rockstar Pro Trios Captain Championship (1 time)
  - Rockstar Pro Tag Team Championship (4 times) – with Dustin Rayz
  - American Luchacore Championship (5 times)
- TNT Extreme Wrestling
  - TNT Extreme Division Championship (1 time)
- Unsanctioned Pro
  - Unsanctioned Pro Hardcore Championship (2 times)
- Wrestling Revolver
  - Revolver World Tag Team Championship (2 times) – with Steve Maclin and RSP (1), and Steve Maclin, Dark Pledge and RSP (1)
- Xtreme Pro Wrestling
  - XPW World Heavyweight Championship (1 time)

Classement PWI 500
Year	2014	2015	2016	2020	2021	2022	2023	2024
Rank	307	▼309	▼389	▼428	▲214	▲211	▼388	▲384
