= GCW Fight Club (2022) =

2022 Game Changer Wrestling event

Fight Club
- Promotional poster for night 1 featuring Jon Moxley and Nick Gage
- Promotion: Game Changer Wrestling
- Date: October 8–9, 2022
- City: Atlantic City, New Jersey
- Venue: Night 1: Garden Pier at the Showboat; Night 2: Showboat Hotel
- Tagline: Everything on the Line... One Last Time

Event chronology
← Previous; War Ready	Next → GCW vs. Vanguardia

Fight Club chronology
← Previous; Fight Club: Houston 2	Next → Fight Club: The Art of War Games

Fight Club was a two-day professional wrestling pay-per-view (PPV) event promoted by Game Changer Wrestling (GCW) that was held on October 8 and 9, 2022. Both nights of the event were held in Atlantic City, New Jersey; night 1 of the event took place at the Garden Pier at the Showboat while night 2 was held inside Showboat Hotel itself. The event aired on PPV via the FITE TV service.

The card comprised 18 matches which were divided evenly between the two nights. In the main event of night 1, Nick Gage defeated Jon Moxley in a Championship vs. Career match to win the GCW World Championship following interference from W. Morrissey and Stokely Hathaway, who were making their GCW debuts. In other prominent matches on night 1, the returning Lio Rush won a six-man scramble match, Drew Parker and Rina Yamashita defeated Alex Colon and Matt Tremont in a tag team death match, and Effy defeated the debuting Shota. In the main event of night 2, Rina Yamashita defeated Ciclope in a death match to retain the GCW Ultraviolent Championship. In other prominent matches on night 2, Joey Janela defeated Cole Radrick in a Title vs. Title match to retain the DDT Extreme Championship and win Radrick's GCW Extreme Championship, Drew Parker defeated Miedo Extremo in a death match to retain the King of Freedom World Championship, and Yamato defeated "Speedball" Mike Bailey.

== Production ==
=== Background ===
On August 30, 2022, Game Changer Wrestling (GCW) announced that they would hold their annual Fight Club event on October 8 and 9 at the Showboat Hotel in Atlantic City, New Jersey. On October 4, GCW announced that night 1 of the event would move from inside the Showboat Hotel to the Garden Pier located outside the venue. The event was the sixth in GCW's Fight Club chronology. As part of Fight Club weekend, Jersey Championship Wrestling (JCW), GCW's developmental promotion, held their JCW vs. The World event.

In addition to GCW wrestlers, wrestlers from All Elite Wrestling, Impact Wrestling, and Japanese promotions DDT Pro-Wrestling, Dragon Gate, and Pro Wrestling Freedoms were scheduled to appear at the event. The Lana Del Rey song "Ultraviolence" was featured in promotional material for the event.

=== Storylines ===
Fight Club featured 18 matches professional wrestling matches across the two nights, with different wrestlers involved in pre-existing scripted feuds, plots and storylines. Wrestlers portrayed either heels or faces as they engaged in a series of tension-building events, which culminated in a wrestling match.

The rivalry between Jon Moxley and Nick Gage dates back to the late 2000s during the two wrestlers' tenures in Combat Zone Wrestling (CZW); in their final encounter before Moxley signed with WWE, Moxley defeated Gage in a no ropes barbed wire match in October 2010 to retain the CZW World Heavyweight Championship. Eleven years later, on April 9, 2021, Moxley made a surprise return to GCW, confronting and attacking Gage after he had successfully retained the GCW World Championship at the promotion's rSpring Break event. On October 9, at Fight Club: Mox vs. Gage, Moxley, who had defeated Matt Cardona to win the GCW World Championship the previous month, defeated Gage in a death match to retain his championship. On August 13, 2022, at Homecoming Weekend, Gage challenged Moxley to a rematch for the GCW World Championship, which Moxley said he would only grant if Gage agreed to risk his career in a Championship vs. Career match. Gage accepted the stipulation. The match was officially announced for Fight Club on August 30.

== Results ==
=== Night 1 ===
No.	Results	Stipulations	Times
1	Lio Rush defeated Blake Christian, Gringo Loco, Jimmy Lloyd, Shane Mercer, and B-Boy by pinfall	Six-man Scramble match	11:54
2	Shun Skywalker defeated Nick Wayne by pinfall	Singles match	10:46
3	Sawyer Wreck defeated Allie Katch by pinfall	Singles match	8:07
4	Tony Deppen defeated Yamato by pinfall	Singles match	8:37
5	Los Macizos (Ciclope and Miedo Extremo) defeated Cole Radrick and Joey Janela by pinfall	Tag team match	11:00
6	Jonathan Gresham defeated Jordan Oliver by pinfall	Singles match	10:01
7	Drew Parker and Rina Yamashita defeated Alex Colon and Matt Tremont by pinfall	Tag team Death match	14:24
8	Effy defeated Shota by pinfall	Singles match	4:34
9	Nick Gage defeated Jon Moxley (c) by pinfall	Championship vs. Career match for the GCW World Championship	21:08
(c) / – the champion(s) heading into the match

=== Night 2 ===
No.	Results	Stipulations	Times
1	Lio Rush defeated Sawyer Wreck, Alec Price, Shane Mercer, Axton Ray, and Dustin Waller by pinfall	Six-person Scramble match	8:17
2	Blake Christian defeated Shun Skywalker by pinfall	Singles match	11:42
3	Masha Slamovich defeated Gringo Loco by pinfall	Singles match	8:22
4	Joey Janela (DDT) defeated Cole Radrick (GCW) by pinfall	Title vs. Title match for the DDT Extreme Championship and GCW Extreme Championship	15:42
5	Jordan Oliver and Nick Wayne vs. Bussy (Effy and Allie Katch) ended in a no contest	Tag team match	10:55
6	Yamato defeated "Speedball" Mike Bailey by pinfall	Singles match	15:13
7	Drew Parker (c) defeated Miedo Extremo by pinfall	Death match for the King of Freedom World Championship	11:52
8	Second Gear Crew (1 Called Manders, Mance Warner, and Matthew Justice) defeated Wasted Youth (Jimmy Lloyd, Dyln McKay, and Marcus Mathers) by pinfall	Six-man tag team match	13:25
9	Rina Yamashita (c) defeated Ciclope by submission	Death match for the GCW Ultraviolent Championship	20:20
(c) / – the champion(s) heading into the match

== See also ==
- 2022 in professional wrestling
