= Otis Cogar =

American professional wrestler (born 1990)

- Cogar in June 2026 as the GCW Ultraviolent Champion

Personal information
- Born: November 19, 1990 (age 35) Cleveland, Ohio, U.S.
- Family: Atticus Cogar (brother)

Professional wrestling career
- Ring name: Otis White Otis Cogar
- Billed height: 178 cm (5 ft 10 in)
- Billed weight: 114 kg (251 lb)
- Debut: 2015

Otis Cogar (born November 19, 1990) is an American professional wrestler. He performs as a freelancer – predominantly for Game Changer Wrestling (GCW), where he is a former two-time GCW Ultraviolent Champion and is a member of VNDL48.

== Professional wrestling career ==
=== American independent circuit (2015–present) ===
Cogar made his professional wrestling debut at MEGA Rock 'em, Sock 'em, Roll 'em, an event promoted by Mega Championship Wrestling (MCW) on June 26, 2015, where he teamed up with Paul Milton and Atticus Cogar in a losing effort against Gregory Iron, Rickey Shane Page and Shinko. Cogar shared tenures with various promotions from the American independent scene such as Ruthless Pro Wrestling (RPW), Premier Championship Wrestling (PCW) and others.

Cogar competed in Combat Zone Wrestling's 19th Tournament of Death where he fell short to Bobby Beverly in the first rounds. In the IWA Mid-South King of the Deathmatch, one of the main competitions of the now-defunct IWA Mid-South promotion, Cogar made his first appearance at the 2021 edition where he defeated Jeff Cannonball in the first rounds, then fell short to Orin Veidt and John Wayne Murdoch in the quarterfinals.

At Hybrid x PWU Midnight Xpress, an event promoted by Pro Wrestling Unplugged and Hybrid Wrestling on April 15, 2026, Cogar teamed up with Atticus Cogar and Christian Napier and fought BLK OUT (JGeorge and Robby Illuminati) and Face (with Skillz Da Great) into a no-contest.

=== Game Changer Wrestling (2021; 2025–present) ===
Cogar made his debut in Game Changer Wrestling at GCW Backyard Wrestling 3 on July 4, 2021, under the ring name of "Otis White" in a losing effort against Dexter White (Atticus Cogar).

During his tenure with the promotion, Cogar chased for various accomplishments and frequently competed as part of the "VNDL48" stable alongside real life brother Atticus Cogar and Christian Napier. At GCW Code of the Streets on January 17, 2026, Cogar defeated Matt Tremont to win the GCW Ultraviolent Championship. He would drop the title back to Tremont at Joey Janela's Spring Break: Immortal Clusterfuck on April 18, 2026. At Cage of Survival 5 on June 7, 2026, he won the title for the second time vy defeating Tremont again, this time in a Cage of Survival match which also involved Anakin Murphy, Conor Claxton, Dr. Redacted, Gabby Forza, Jamesen Shook, Jeffrey John, Jimmy Lloyd, Lil Sicko, Lucky 13, Masashi Takeda, and Vipress. At GCW Life Of Crime on June 28, 2026, Cogar teamed up with Atticus Cogar to unsuccessfully challenge Bustah And The Brain (Alec Price and Jordan Oliver).

At GCW Amerikaz Most Wanted on March 30, 2025, Cogar defeated Sam Stackhouse in a Death match.

=== Juggalo Championship Wrestling (2025–present) ===
As a GCW talent, Cogar regularly has worked with Juggalo Championship Wrestling. On the first night of JCW vs. GCW: The 2 Day War on August 14, 2025, he teamed up with Atticus Cogar and Christian Napier to defeat Flowe Caine (Cocaine and Steven Flowe) and Luigi Primo. On the second night of the event from one evening later, he competed in a twenty-man battle riot won by Joey Janela. At JCW Carnival of Chaos on September 24, 2026, Cogar teamed up with Slade and Nick Gage in a losing effort against Juggalo World Order (2 Tuff Tony, Willie Mack, and Painful Paul).

== Championships and accomplishments ==
- Game Changer Wrestling
  - GCW Ultraviolent Championship (2 times)
- Mega Championship Wrestling
  - MEGA Tag Team Championship (1 time) – with Atticus Cogar
- Midwest Championship Wrestling
  - NWA Midwest Tag Team Championship (1 time) – with Atticus Cogar
- Premier Championship Wrestling
  - PCW Tag Team Championship (1 time, inaugural) – with Atticus Cogar
  - PCW Tag Team Championship Tournament (2017) – with Atticus Cogar
- Pro Wrestling Illustrated
  - Ranked No. 116 of the top 500 singles wrestlers in the PWI 500 in 2026
- Ruthless Pro Wrestling
  - RPW Tag Team Championship (1 time, current) – with Zach Thomas and Gregory Iron

Classement PWI 500
Year	2025	2026
Rank	362	▲116
