= Atticus Cogar =

American professional wrestler (born 1997)

- Cogar in August 2026

Personal information
- Born: 15 March 1997 (age 29) Cleveland, Ohio, United States
- Family: Otis Cogar (brother)

Professional wrestling career
- Ring name: Atticus Cogar Dexter White Ralph
- Billed height: 178 cm (5 ft 10 in)
- Billed weight: 73 kg (161 lb)
- Debut: 2015

Atticus Cogar is an American professional wrestler. He is signed to Game Changer Wrestling (GCW), where he is the current GCW World Champion in his second reign and the leader of VNDL48.

== Professional wrestling career ==
=== American independent circuit (2015–present) ===
Cogar made his professional wrestling debut at MEGA Rock 'em, Sock 'em, Roll 'em, an event promoted by Mega Championship Wrestling on June 26, 2015, where he teamed up with Otis Cogar and Paul Milton in a losing effort against Gregory Iron, Rickey Shane Page and Shinko in six-man tag team competition. He is known for his tenures with various promotions from the American independent scene such as Pro Wrestling eXpress (PWX), Premier Championship Wrestling (PCW), International Wrestling Cartel (IWC) and others.

Cogar competed in IWA Mid-South's Prince of the Death Matches tournament from 2020, competition from which he emerged victorious by defeating Kevin Giza in the quarterfinals, Mason Martin in the semifinals and Lukas Jacobs in the finals.

At RCW CONVERGE: Wrestling Supercard, an event promoted by Ruthless Wrestling on August 3, 2024, Cogar unsuccessfully challenged EC3 for the NWA World's Heavyweight Championship.

=== Game Changer Wrestling (2019–present) ===
Cogar made his debut in Game Changer Wrestling at GCW Jimmy Lloyd's Halloween Frightfest on October 27, 2019, where he defeated Matt Tremont in singles competition.

During his time with the promotion, he chased for various titles and accomplishments. At GCW Guilty Conscience on September 2, 2021, he teamed up with Eric Ryan to unsuccessfully challenge The Second Gear Crew (Mance Warner and Matthew Justice) for the GCW Tag Team Championship. In the GCW Nick Gage Invitational 6 tournament, Cogar defeated Rina Yamashita in the first rounds, then fell short to Masashi Takeda in the semifinals, bout which was also disputed for Takeda's GCW Ultraviolent Championship. At GCW Dream On on November 22, 2025, he defeated reigning champion Effy to win the GCW World Championship in a three-way match also involving Charles Mason. He lost the title on August 15 at Homecoming Weekend: Night 1 to Joseph Sawyer.

Cogar competed in various of the promotion's signature events. At The Wrld on GCW on January 23, 2022, he teamed up with "44OH!" stablemates Eddy Only, Gregory Iron, and Bobby Beverly in a losing effort against Second Gear Crew (Mance Warner and Matthew Justice) in a 4-on-2 handicap match. In the Jersey J-Cup, he made his first appearance at the 2025 edition where he defeated Joey Janela in the first rounds, then fell short to Sidney Akeem in the quarterfinals. In the Joey Janela's Spring Break series of events, Cogar made his first appearance at Spring Break 4 on October 10, 2020, where he competed in the traditional Clusterfuck Battle Royal from which he emerged as runner up to "Spyder" Nate Webb. The bout also featured notable opponents, both male and female such as Cassandro El Exotico, Marko Stunt, Elayna Black, Jody Threat, Parrow and many others.

On November 22, 2025 at Dream On, Atticus defeated Effy and Charles Mason to win the GCW World Championship, marking his first title in GCW, but lost the title on August 15, 2026 on Night 1 of Homecoming Weekend to Joseph Sawyer. He regained the title from Sawyer on November 7, 2026 at The Crossroads in a No Rules match.

== Championships and accomplishments ==
Cogar is a former GCW World Champion.

- Circle 6
  - Circle 6 World Championship (1 time)
- Game Changer Wrestling
  - GCW World Championship (2 times, current)
- H2O Wrestling: Hardcore Hustle Organization
  - H2O Danny Havoc Hardcore Championship (1 time)
- ICW No Holds Barred
  - ICW American Deathmatch World Championship (1 time)
- Midwest Championship Wrestling
  - NWA Midwest Tag Team Championship (1 time) – with Otis Cogar
- IWA Mid-South
  - Prince of the Death Matches (2020)
  - Double Death Tag Team Tournament (2021) – with Eric Ryan
- Mega Championship Wrestling
  - MEGA Championship (1 time)
  - MEGA Tag Team Championship (1 time) – with Otis Cogar
- No Peace Underground
  - NPU Championship (1 time)
- Premier Championship Wrestling
  - PCW Championship (1 time)
  - PCW Tag Team Championship (1 time, inaugural) – with Otis Cogar
  - PCW Tag Team Title Tournament (2017) – with Otis Cogar
- Pro Wrestling Illustrated
  - Ranked No. 38 of the top 500 singles wrestlers in the PWI 500 in 2026
- Ruthless Pro Wrestling
  - RPW Championship (1 time)

== Luchas de Apuestas record ==
Winner (wager)	Loser (wager)	Location	Event	Date	Notes
Atticus Cogar (career)	Fuego Del Sol (mask)	Las Vegas, NV	Joey Janela's Spring Break 9	April 8, 2025	
