= Cole Radrick =

American wrestler (born 1997)

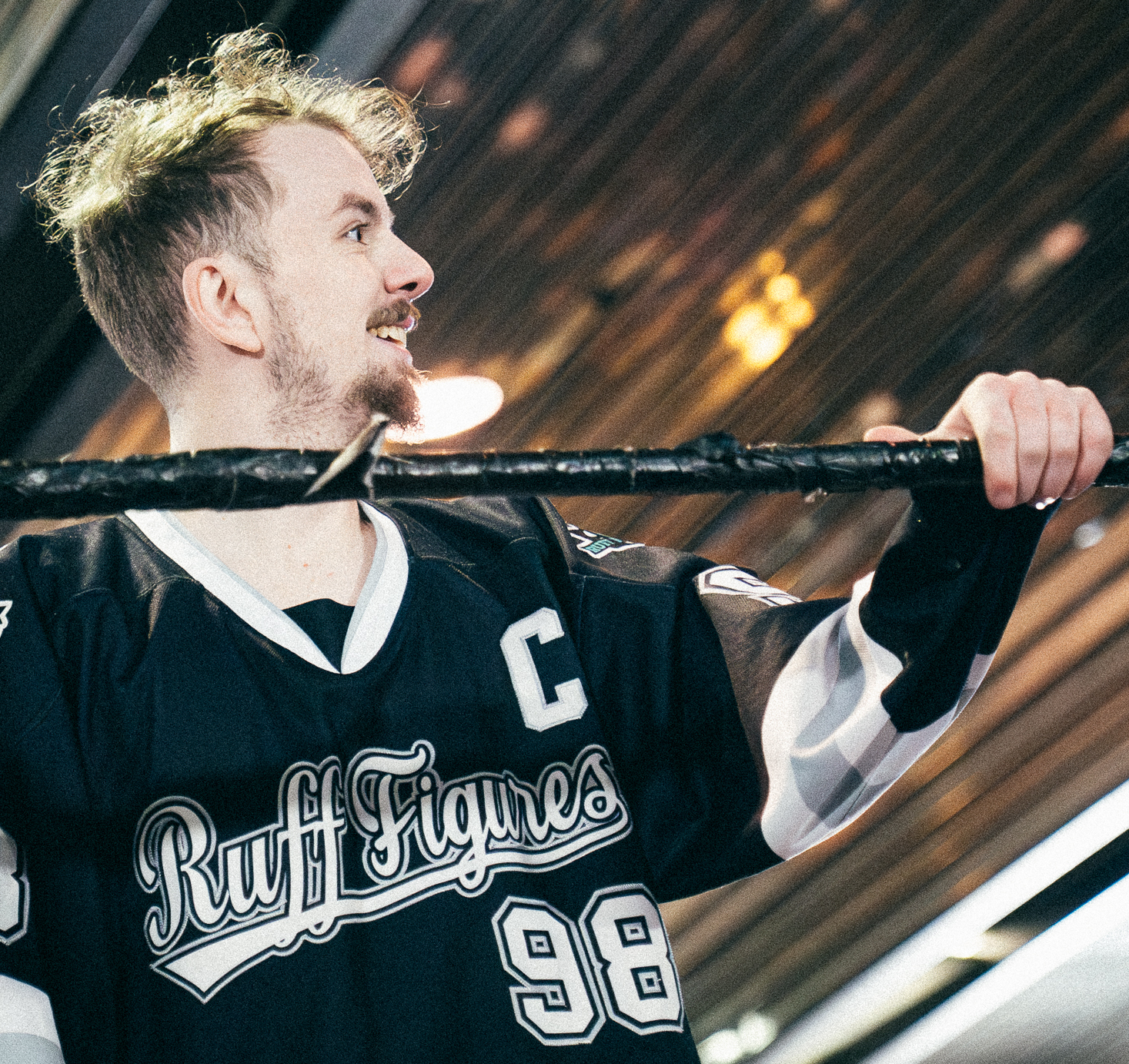
- Radrick in April 2024

Personal information
- Born: Joey Hodge; 25 August 1997 (age 29) Spencer, Indiana, United States

Professional wrestling career
- Ring name: Cole Radrick Cole McQuinn Jack Williams Mayday Jack Wallflower
- Billed height: 5 ft 9 in (175 cm)
- Billed weight: 170 lb (77 kg)
- Debut: 2015

Joey Hodge better known by his ring name Cole Radrick is an American professional wrestler, currently working as a freelancer – predominantly for Game Changer Wrestling (GCW), where is former one-time GCW Extreme Champion and former one-time GCW Tag Team Champion. He is best known for his tenures with New Wave Pro Wrestling, Rockstar Pro Wrestling and IWA: Mid-South.

== Professional wrestling career ==
=== American independent circuit (2015–present) ===
Hodge made his professional wrestling debut at NWP Revenge, an event promoted by New Wave Pro Wrestling on June 6, 2015, where he lost to Blaine Black.

Hodge shared brief or longer tenures with various promotions from the American independent scene such as IWA Mid-South, Game Changer Wrestling, Rockstar Pro Wrestling and many others. At ROH on HonorClub #29 on September 9, 2023, he teamed up with Matt Brannigan in a losing effort against Gates of Agony (Bishop Kaun and Toa Liona). At DPW Spark #7, an event promoted by Deadlock Pro-Wrestling on December 16, 2022, Hodge unsuccessfully challenged Baliyan Akki for the Super Asia Championship.

==== IWA Mid-South (2015–2019) ====
Hodge made his debut in IWA Mid-South at IWA Mid-South Family Tradition on November 13, 2015, where he teamed up with Joseph Schwartz, Nick Depp, Reed Bentley and Zodiak in a losing effort against JC Rotten, Joey Venom, John Wayne Murdoch, Randi West and Slade Sludge. In time, he challenged for various titles promoted by IWA. At IWA Mid-South Fallout on September 8, 2016, he unsuccessfully challenged JJ Garrett for the IWA Mid-South Heavyweight Championship.

During his time with the promotion, he competed in one of its signature events, the Ted Petty Invitational in which he made his only appearance at the 2016 edition by defeating Sami Callihan in the first rounds, then falling short to John Wayne Murdoch, Jake Crist and Shane Mercer in the second rounds.

==== Game Changer Wrestling (2019–present) ====
Hodge made his debut in Game Changer Wrestling at GCW Chopper City in the Ghetto on November 27, 2019, where he competed in a six-man scramble won by Lucky 13 and also involving Frankie Pickard, JJ Garrett, Pinkie Sanchez and Steve Sanders.

Hodge competed in various of the promotion's flagship events. At The Wrld on GCW on January 23, 2022, he competed in a Pabst Blue Ribbon Kickoff Battle Royal won by Big Vin and also involving Psycho Clown, Dark Sheik, Parrow, Ruckus and many others. At GCW Fight Club on October 8 and 9, 2022, he competed twice. On the first night by teaming up with Joey Janela in a losing effort against Los Macizos (Ciclope and Miedo Extremo), and on the second night by falling short to Janela in a Title vs. title match disputed for both Hodge's GCW Extreme Championship and Janela's DDT Extreme Championship from which the latter emerged victorious.

Hodge also competed in one of GCW's signature events, the Jersey J-Cup, in which he made his first appearance at the 2023 edition where he defeated Dante Leon, Dyln McKay, Grim Reefer, Marcus Mathers and Yoya in the first rounds, then fell short to Blake Christian in the quarterfinals. One year later at the 2024 edition, he competed in a six-way first round won by Myron Reed and also involving Mr. Danger, Jack Cartwheel, Charles Mason and Billie Starkz. He also competed one night later in a Twelve-person mixed tag team match in which he teamed up with Mr. Danger, Man Like DeReiss, Allie Katch and Los Mazicos (Ciclope and Miedo Extremo) to defeat Charles Mason, Griffin McCoy, Jack Cartwheel, Jimmy Lloyd, Kerry Morton and Tony Deppen.

As for the Joey Janela's Spring Break, he made his first appearance at the Spring Break 4 on October 10, 2020, where he competed in the traditional Clusterfuck Battle Royal, bout won by "Spyder" Nate Webb and also involving many other notable opponents such as Flash Flanagan, JTG, Cassandro El Exotico, Jody Threat, Mance Warner, Matthew Justice and Effy. At Spring Break 8 on April 5, 2024, Hodge won a Grab the Brass Ring Ladder match for a future GCW World Championship match in which he defeated Mr. Danger, Aigle Blanc, Alec Price, Marcus Mathers, Microman, Myron Reed, Arez and Leon Slater. He scored his latest appearance in the battle royal at Spring Break: Clusterfuck Forever on April 7, 2024, bout won by Microman and also involving Nick Gage, 1 Called Manders, Johnny Kashmere, Alex Zayne, H. C. Loc, Justin Credible, Tommy Dreamer and others.

==== British and Japanese independent scene promotions ====
Hodge often competes as developmental talent for promotions such as TNT Extreme Wrestling and Progress Wrestling from the British circuit and Pro Wrestling Freedoms or DDT Pro-Wrestling from the Japanese circuit due to GCW sharing business partnerships with them. At GCW The Art Of War 2022 from September 3, 2022, he competed in a ladder match for the DDT Extreme Championship in which Joey Janela retained the title over him and Dante Leon, Drago Kid, Gringo Loco, Mike Bailey, Shane Mercer and Tony Deppen. At FREEDOMS/GCW 13th Anniversary on October 2, 2022, he teamed up with Joey Janela to unsuccessfully challenge Soul Meat (Tomoya Hirata and Toru Sugiura) for the King of Freedom World Tag Team Championship.

On the 2023 edition of TNT Extreme Wrestling's DOA Deathmatch Tournament, Hodge defeated BA Rose in the first rounds, Aspen Faith in the second rounds, then fell short to Big F'n Joe in the finals. At PROGRESS Chapter 141: Handshakes & Cheeseburgers on September 18, 2022, he competed in a seven-way match won by Man Like DeReiss and also involving Callum Newman, Danny Black, Jordan Oliver, Robbie X and Tony Deppen.

== Championships and accomplishments ==
- Black Label Pro
  - BLP Heavyweight Championship (1 time)
- Brawl USA
  - Brawl Championship (1 time)
- DDT Pro-Wrestling
  - Ironman Heavymetalweight Championship (1 time)
- Rival Showdown Pro Wrestling
  - Rival Showdown Omni Championship (1 time, inaugural)
- Emerge Wrestling
  - Emerge Outbreak Championship (1 time)
  - Emerge Tag Team Championship (1 time) – with Jeremy Hadley
- New Wave Pro Wrestling
  - NWP Crossroads Championship (1 time)
  - Eminent 8 Tournament (2017)
- Game Changer Wrestling
  - GCW Extreme Championship (1 time)
  - GCW Tag Team Championship (1 time) – with Alec Price
- GrapHouse
  - GrapHouse W4TN Championship (1 time)
- New Texas Pro Wrestling
  - New Texas Pro LoneStar Championship (1 time)
- Paradigm Pro Wrestling
  - PPW Triple Crown Championship (1 time)
  - PPW Super Middleweight Championship (1 time)
- Pro Wrestling Illustrated
  - Ranked No. 278 of the top 500 singles wrestlers in the PWI 500 in 2024
- Supreme Wrestling
  - Supreme Junior Heavyweight Championship (1 time)
- Unsanctioned Pro
  - Unsanctioned Pro Heavyweight Championship (1 time)
- Zowa Live
  - Zowa Tag Team Championship (1 time) – with Sage Philips

Classement PWI 500
Year	2020	2021	2022	2023	2024	2025
Rank	442	▼476	▲320	▲300	▲278	▼467
