= Lucky 13 (wrestler) =

American male professional wrestler (born 1984)

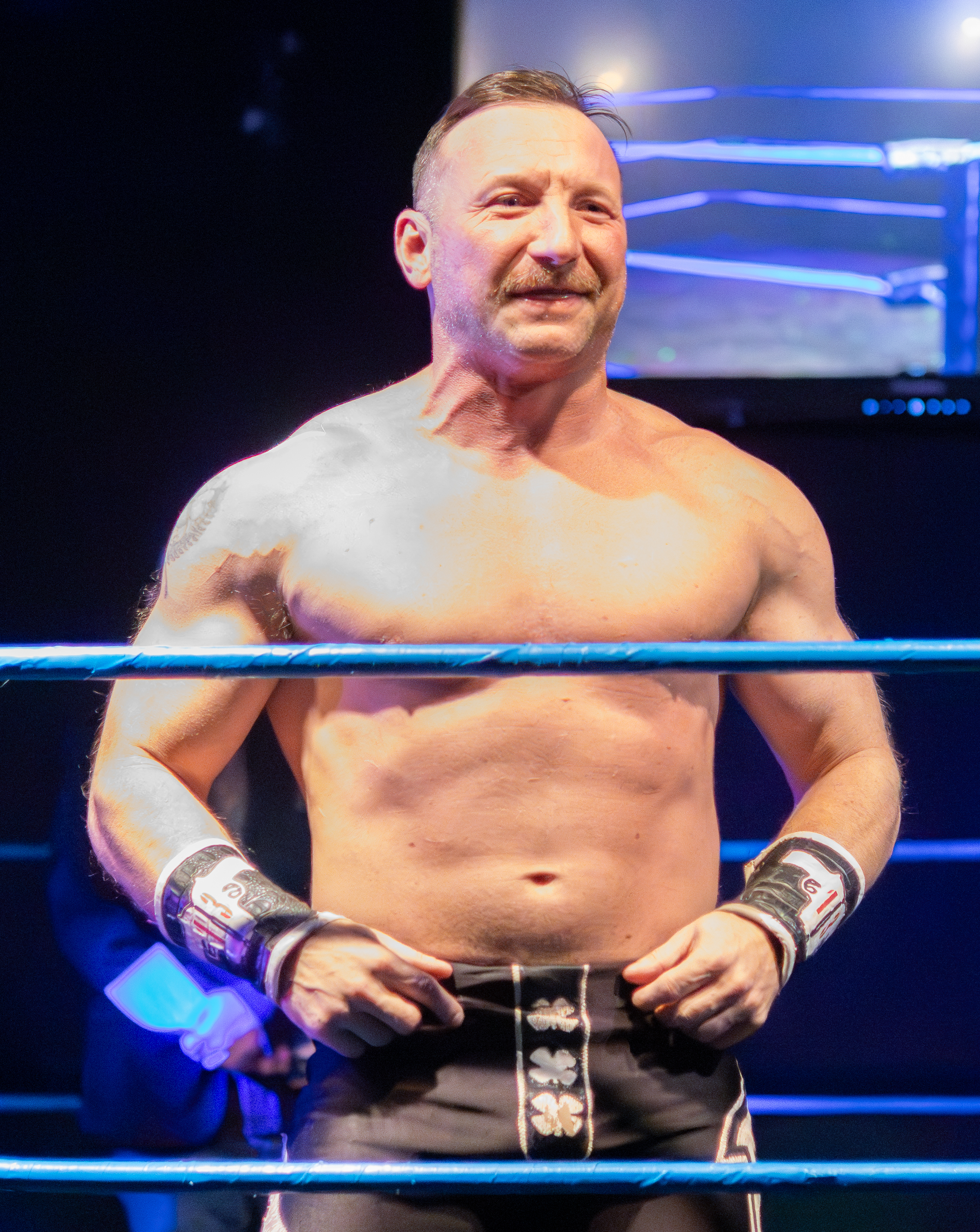
- Lucky 13 in December 2025

Personal information
- Born: September 19, 1984 (age 41) Bloomsbury, New Jersey, U.S.

Professional wrestling career
- Ring name: Lucky the Leprechaun Lucky tHURTeen Retail Dragon tHURTeen Lucky 13 Lucky Jr. Lucky
- Billed height: 168 cm (5 ft 6 in)
- Billed weight: 84 kg (185 lb)
- Trained by: Supreme Lee Great; Mike Quackenbush; Claudio Castagnoli; Chris Hero
- Debut: 2004

Kevin J. Papics (born September 19, 1984), better known by his ring name Lucky 13, is an American professional wrestler best known for his time with Combat Zone Wrestling (CZW) and Game Changer Wrestling. He also performs in various promotions from the American independent scene.

== Professional wrestling career ==
=== American independent circuit (2004–present) ===
Papics made his professional wrestling debut at VWA Second Coming, a house show promoted by Valley Wrestling Alliance on May 23, 2004, where he teamed up with JC Ryder in a losing effort against The Ring Crew (Ring Crew 1 and Ring Crew 2) in tag team competition. He is known for his tenures with various promotions from the American independent scene such as Pro Wrestling Unplugged (PWU), H2O Wrestling, Ground Breaking Wrestling (GBW) and many others.

In Chikara, Papics competed in the 2005 edition of the Chikara Young Lions Cup in which he competed under the ring name of Retail Dragon fell short to Mickie Knuckles in the first rounds.

=== Combat Zone Wrestling (2005–2016) ===
Papics shared a decade-long tenure with Combat Zone Wrestling. He is a forme two-time CZW Tag Team Champion, title which he last won at Cage of Death XIV on December 8, 2012, by teaming up with Danny Havoc and Devin Moore and defeat 4Loco (Alex Colon, Azreal, Bandido Jr., and Chrissy Rivera) in an Ultraviolent Insanity match.

During his time with the promotion, Papics competed in several signature events. In the CZW Cage of Death series, he made his debut at Cage of Death VIII: Coming Undone on December 9, 2006, where he teamed up with "New Jersey All-Stars" tag team partner JC Ryder in a losing effort against Andy Sumner and Drew Gulak. At Cage of Death XII on December 11, 2010, he teamed up with Drake Younger and "Cult Fiction" stablemates Brain Damage and Masada in a losing effort against Suicide Kings (Danny Havoc, Devon Moore, Dysfunction and Scotty Vortekz) as a result of a Four-on-four Cage of Death match.

In the CZW Best of the Best series of events, he made his first appearance at the Best of the Best XIII on April 12, 2014, where he fell short to Chuck Taylor in singles competition. At Best of the Best 14 on Apri, 11, 2015, Papics teamed up with "The Nation Of Intoxication" tag team partner Danny Havoc and defeated Ohio Is for Killers (Dave Crist and Jake Crist) by disqualification in a match contested for the CZW Tag Team Championship, failing to win the titles.

In the CZW Tournament of Death series, Papics made his first appearance at the 2012 edition where he short to Devin Moore and Danny Havoc in a Drunken scaffold match.

=== Game Changer Wrestling (2015–present) ===
Papics competes regularly in Game Changer Wrestling. He made his debut at GCW The Acid Cup on October 22, 2016, where he teamed up with Devon Moore and unsuccessfully challenged Da Hit Squad (Mafia and Monsta Mack), Private Party (Isiah Kassidy and Marq Quen) and BLKOUT (Ruckus and Robby Mireno in a four-way tag team match contested for the GCW Tag Team Championship. At GCW Code Of The Streets 2019 on March 8, he fell short to Ophidian in singles competition. At GCW Planet Death 2021 on April 10, he unsuccessfully challenged Alex Colon for the inaugural GCW Ultraviolent Championship. At GCW Til Infinity 2024, Papics competed in a number one contendership rumble match for the GCW World Championship won by Megan Bayne and also involving various other notable opponents such as 1 Called Manders, Joey Janela, Blake Christian and many others.

== Championships and accomplishments ==
- Catalyst Wrestling/Capitol Wrestling
  - Catalyst/Capitol Wrestling Tag Team Championship (2 time) – with Wrecking Ball Legursky (1) and KC Navarro (1)
- Combat Zone Wrestling
  - CZW Tag Team Championship (2 times) – with Danny Havoc and Devon Moore
- Ground Breaking Wrestling
  - GBW Breaker Championship (2 times)
- H2O Wrestling: Hardcore Hustle Organization
  - H2O Heavyweight Championship (1 time)
  - H2O Hybrid Championship (1 time)
  - H2O Danny Havoc Hardcore Championship (1 time)
- Pro Wrestling Illustrated
  - Ranked No. 287 of the top 500 singles wrestlers in the PWI 500 in 2015
