= GCW Extreme Championship =

- Last design of the title

Details
- Promotion: Game Changer Wrestling
- Date established: September 13, 2013
- Date retired: January 19, 2025

Other names
- JCW Extreme Championship (2013–2015); GCW Extreme Championship (2015–2025); GCW Unified Extreme & Ultraviolent Championship (2025)
Statistics
- First champion: Bandido Jr.
- Final champion: Matt Tremont
- Most reigns: All titleholders (1)
- Longest reign: PCO (1,225 days)
- Shortest reign: Matt Tremont (<1 day)

The GCW Extreme Championship was a professional wrestling hardcore championship created and promoted by the American promotion Game Changer Wrestling (GCW). It was one of the two hardcore championships promoted by the promotion, alongside the GCW Ultraviolent Championship. The title was eligible to won by both male and female wrestlers.

== Title history ==
Like most professional wrestling championships, the title was won as a result of a scripted match. Championship matches typically occur on GCW events. There was a total of eleven reigns shared between eleven different champions.

=== Reigns ===
Key
| No. | Overall reign number |
| Reign | Reign number for the specific champion |
| Days | Number of days held |
| <1 | Reign lasted less than a day |
| + | Current reign is changing daily |

| No. | Champion | Championship change | | | Reign statistics | | Notes | Ref. |
| No. | Champion | Date | Event | Location | Reign | Days | Notes | Ref. |
|---|---|---|---|---|---|---|---|---|
Jersey Championship Wrestling (JCW)
| 1 | Bandido Jr. | September 13, 2013 | Extreme Title Tournament | Hasbrouck Heights, New Jersey | 1 | 505 | Bandido defeated Danny Demanto in a tournament final to become the inaugural champion. | |
| 2 | Steve Scott | January 31, 2015 | JCW Live event | Manville, New Jersey | 1 | 42 | This was a four-way match which also involving Frightmare and Lucky 13. | |
| 3 | Pinkie Sanchez | March 14, 2015 | JCW Live event | Howell, New Jersey | 1 | 391 | Sanchez defeated Danny Demanto, who was filling in for Steve Scott. | |
Game Changer Wrestling (GCW)
| 4 | Smiley | April 8, 2016 | GCW Live event | Hasbrouck Heights, New Jersey | 1 | 568 | | |
| 5 | Tony Deppen | October 28, 2017 | Worst Behavior | Howell, New Jersey | 1 | 315 | This was a four-way match which also involving Eli Everfly and Zenshi. | |
| 6 | PCO | September 8, 2018 | Nick Gage Invitational 3: Thy Kingdom Come | Villa Park, Illinois | 1 | 1,225 | This was a four-way match which also involved Gringo Loco and Nate Webb. | |
| 7 | AJ Gray | January 15, 2022 | Say You Will | Hoffman Estates, Illinois | 1 | 195 | | |
| 8 | Cole Radrick | July 29, 2022 | The People vs. GCW | Nashville, Tennessee | 1 | 72 | This was a six-way scramble match also involving Axton Ray, Grim Reefer, Marko Stunt, and Shane Mercer. | |
| 9 | Joey Janela | October 9, 2022 | Fight Club; Night 2 | Atlantic City, New Jersey | 1 | 517 | This was a winner takes all match where Janela's DDT Extreme Championship was also on the line. | |
| 10 | Maki Itoh | March 9, 2024 | Ashes To Ashes | Atlantic City, New Jersey | 1 | 316 | This was a six-way scramble match also including Alex Zayne, "Broski" Jimmy Lloyd, Jack Cartwheel, and Marcus Mathers. Itoh became the first female to hold the championship. | |
| 11 | Matt Tremont | January 19, 2025 | The People vs. GCW | New York City, New York | 1 | <1 | This was a Unification DLC match also including Brandon Kirk, Dr. Redacted, Drew Parker, John Wayne Murdoch, Matthew Justice and Rina Yamashita, alongside the vacant GCW Ultraviolent Championship on the line. | |
| — | Unified | January 19, 2025 | The People vs. GCW | New York City, New York | — | — | Unified with the GCW Ultraviolent Championship. | |
