= Alec Price =

American wrestler (born 1998)

- Price in April 2025

Personal information
- Born: 3 November 1998 (age 27) Boston, Massachusetts, United States

Professional wrestling career
- Ring name: Alec Price Bustah Alec Smith Jeremy Gossard Ultimo X
- Billed height: 183 cm (6 ft 0 in)
- Billed weight: 75 kg (165 lb)
- Trained by: Beau Douglas; Bell Time Club; Benny Jux; Mike McCarthy; Paul Richard
- Debut: 2017

Alec Parnell, better known by his ring name Alec Price, is an American professional wrestler. He is signed to All Elite Wrestling (AEW) and its sister promotion Ring of Honor (ROH), where he is one-half of Bustah and the Brain with Jordan Oliver . He also performs on the independent circuit – predominantly for Game Changer Wrestling (GCW).

== Professional wrestling career ==
=== Independent circuit (2017–present) ===
Parnell made his professional wrestling debut in Undisputed Fight Organization (UFO) at a house show from June 21, 2017, where he defeated Benny Jux in singles competition. Parnell shared tenures with various promotions from the United States such as Beyond Wrestling, Alpha-1, Black Label Pro and many others.

At Holiday Rush, an event promoted by Major League Wrestling on December 7, 2023, he competed in a scramble match won by Akira and also involving Love, Doug, Nolo Kitano, J Boujii, and Brett Ryan Gosselin. He made his first appearance in AEW at AEW Rampage #171 on November 13, 2024, where he teamed up with Richard Holliday in a losing effort against La Faccion Ingobernable (Rush and The Beast Mortos).

=== Game Changer Wrestling (2021–present) ===
Parnell made his debut in Game Changer Wrestling in the "JCW" branch of events at JCW The Fight Before Xmas on December 19, 2021, where he fell short to Billie Starkz in singles competition.

He competed in various of the promotion's signature events. In Joey Janela's Spring Break, he made his first appearance at Part 1 of the sixth event from March 31, 2022, where he competed in a Seven-man scramble won by Nick Wayne and also involving Gringo Loco, Jack Cartwheel, Jimmy Lloyd, Jordan Oliver and Ninja Mack. At the second part from April 1, he competed in the traditional Clusterfuck Battle Royal co-won by The Second Gear Crew (AJ Gray, Mance Warner and Matthew Justice) which also involved notable opponents such as LuFisto, Maven, Jimmy Wang Yang, Josh Barnett and others.

Parnell made his debut in the Jersey J-Cup tournament at the 2023 edition where he fell short to Blake Christian in the first rounds. At the 2024 edition, he defeated Jonathan Gresham in the first rounds, Joey Janela in the quarterfinals, then fell short to Masha Slamovich in the semifinals. He scored his best result at the 2025 edition where he defeated Cole Radrick in the first rounds, Clark Connors in the quarterfinals, Sidney Akeem in the semifinals, but fell short to Masha Slamovich in the finals in a bout which was also contested for Slamovich's JCW World Championship.

On the second night of the GCW Fight Club from October 9, 2022, he competed in a Six-man scramble won by Lio Rush and also involving Sawyer Wreck, Shane Mercer, Axton Ray, and Dustin Waller.

During his time with the promotion, Parnell chased for various championships. At GCW Homecoming Weekend 2022 on August 14, he unsuccessfully competed in a Six-man scramble for the GCW Extreme Championship bout won by reigning champion Cole Radrick and also involving Axton Ray, Gringo Loco, Jimmy Lloyd and Masha Slamovich. At The People vs. GCW on January 19, 2025, he teamed up with Cole Radrick as "Gahbage Daddies" and defeated Violence Is Forever (Dominic Garrini and Kevin Ku) for the GCW Tag Team Championship. Parnell won the titles on the second occasion by teaming up with Jordan Oliver as "YNDP" at Joey Janela's Spring Break 9 on April 18, 2025, by again defeating Violence Is Forever.

=== All Elite Wrestling / Ring of Honor (2026–present) ===
On January 16, 2026 at Limitless Wrestling's Limitless Rumble event, Price unsuccessfully challenged MJF for the AEW World Championship. After the match, MJF announced that Price and his tag team partner Jordan Oliver had signed with All Elite Wrestling (AEW). Price and Oliver made their AEW debut on the January 21 episode of Dynamite, losing to FTR (Cash Wheeler and Dax Harwood). Price and Oliver later adopted the tag team name of "Bustah and the Brain" and began performing for AEW's sister promotion Ring of Honor (ROH).

== Championships and accomplishments ==
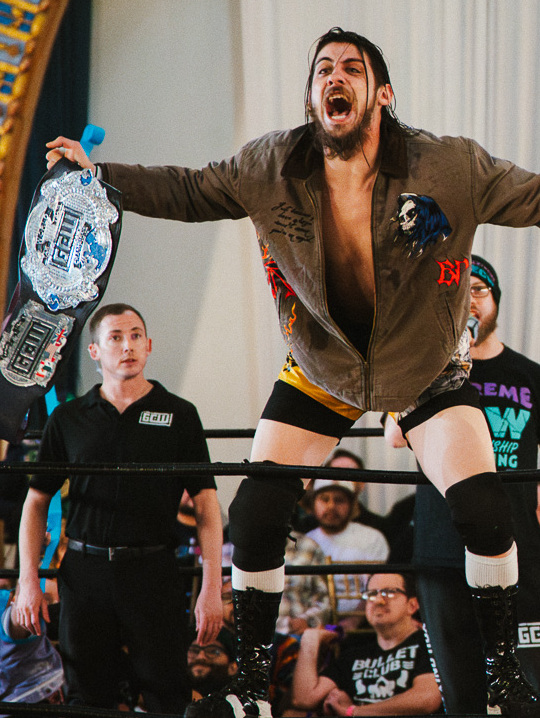
Price is a three-time GCW Tag Team Champion

- Game Changer Wrestling
  - GCW Tag Team Championship (3 times) – with Cole Radrick (1) and Jordan Oliver (2)
- Xcite Wrestling
  - Xcite Tag Team Championship (1 time) – with Jordan Oliver
- Juggalo Championship Wrestling
  - JCW Tag Team Championship (1 time) – with Jordan Oliver as YDNP
- Alpha-1 Wrestling
  - A1 Zero Gravity Championship (1 time)
- Pro Wrestling Illustrated
  - Ranked No. 92 of the top 500 singles wrestlers in the PWI 500 in 2024

Classement PWI 500
Year	2022	2023	2024	2025	2026
Rank	159	▲131	▲92	▼165	▼162
