= GCW Tag Team Championship =

Professional wrestling championship

- Current title design (2022–present)

Details
- Promotion: JCW (1999–2015); GCW (2015–present)
- Date established: April 1, 1999
- Current champions: KJ Orso and Sam Stackhouse
- Date won: August 15, 2026

Other names
- JCW Tag Championship (1999–2015); GCW Tag Championship (2015–present)
Statistics
- First champions: Nick Niosi and Ricky O
- Most reigns: As a team: Los Macisos (Ciclope and Miedo Extremo) (4 reigns); As individual: Ciclope and Miedo Extremo (4 reigns)
- Longest reign: Los Macizos (Ciclope and Miedo Extremo) (1,162 days)
- Shortest reign: EYFBO (Angel Ortiz and Mike Dratzik) (1 day)
- Oldest champion: Mafia (42 years, 136 days)

The GCW Tag Team Championship is a professional wrestling world tag team championship created and promoted by the American promotion Game Changer Wrestling. Established on April 1, 1999 as JCW Tag Team Championship, the inaugural champions were Nick Niosi and Ricky O. The current champions are KJ Orso and Sam Stackhouse, who are in their first reign as a team and individually. They won the title by defeating Bustah and the Brain (Alec Price and Jordan Oliver) at GCW Homecoming Weekend: Night 1 on August 15, 2026.

== Title history ==
There have been a total of 43 reigns between 35 different teams consisting of 61 distinctive champions, and 5 vacancies

The current champions are KJ Orso and Sam Stackhouse, who are in their first reign as a team and individually. They won the title by defeating Bustah and the Brain (Alec Price and Jordan Oliver) at GCW Homecoming Weekend: Night 1 in Atlantic City, New Jersey, on August 15, 2026.

=== Reigns ===
Key
No.	Overall reign number
Reign	Reign number for the specific team—reign numbers for the individuals are in parentheses, if different
Days	Number of days held
+	Current reign is changing daily

No.	Champion	Championship change			Reign statistics		Notes	Ref.
No.	Champion	Date	Event	Location	Reign	Days	Notes	Ref.
Jersey Championship Wrestling (JCW)
1	The MOB (Nick Niosi and Ricky O)	April 1, 1999	JCW House show	New Jersey	1	274-387	It is currently unknown how Niosi and Ricky O have been billed as inaugural champions. The exact length of this reign is uncertain.	
—	Vacated	2000	—	—	—	—	The titles were vacated under unknown circumstances somewhere between January and April 22, 2000.	
2	Da Hit Squad (Mafia and Monsta Mack)	April 22, 2000	JCW House show	Elmwood Park, NJ	1	259	Defeated The Haas Brothers (Charlie Haas and Russ Haas) to win the vacant titles.	
—	Vacated	January 6, 2001	—	—	—	—		
3	The Moondogs 2000 (Moondog Molsonn and Moondog Wenzel)	January 14, 2001	Teaneck Turmoil	Teaneck, NJ	1	80		
4	Low Ki and Mafia (2)	April 4, 2001	Anarchy	Lodi, NJ	1	N/A	The exact length of this reign is uncertain.	
—	Vacated	2001-2002	—	—	—	—	Titles were vacated under unknown circumstances somewhere between April 4, 2001 and 2002. The vacancy period is too long for an estimative duration of Low Ki and Mafia's reign to be determined.	
5	The Solution (Havok and Papadon)	2001-2002	JCW House show	New Jersey	1	N/A	The exact length of this reign is uncertain. Neither the exact date when Havok and Papadon won the titles is known. The first documentation of them holding the titles was a defence against Andrew Anderson and Wenzel from March 3, 2002.	
6	Los Boricuas (Tony Blaze and Warpath)	December 29, 2002	JCW House show	Paramus, NJ	1	2-70	The exact length of this reign is uncertain.	
7	The Dirty Rotten Scoundrelz (EC Negro and KC Blade)	January–March 2003	N/A	N/A	1	N/A	Cagematch.de states that EC Negro and KC Blade held the titles beginning from somewhere between January and March 2003. However their title win does not appear in the title history list, but it does in a title defence against Tony Blaze and Warpath from March 9, 2003 at the JCW Skin To Win event.	
8	Los Boricuas (Tony Blaze and Warpath)	May 4, 2003	It All Ends Here	Passaic, NJ	2	147		
9	Team Ethic (Dave Greco and Dixie)	September 28, 2003	Snow Day	Garfield, NJ	1	56		
10	Hybrid (Inferno and Wenzel (2))	November 23, 2003	Crazy 8	Garfield, NJ	1	91	This was a Crazy 8 Tournament semi-final. Wenzel was previously known as Moondog Wenzel.	
11	Ace Darling and Matt Striker	February 22, 2004	House show	Garfield, NJ	1	N/A	The exact length of this reign is uncertain.	
—	Vacated	2004	—	—	—	—	Titles were vacated under unknown circumstances somewhere after February 22, 2004.	
12	Joey Janela and Rhett Titus	March 28, 2014	—	N/A	1	77	After one successful title defense with Titus on April 26, 2014, Janela defended the title alone on June 13, 2014.	
13	Glitz And Glamour (Jarrett Foster, Steven Sterling and Aaron Stride)	June 13, 2014	JCW House show	Long Branch, NJ	1	133	This was a 2-on-1 handicap match in which Janela defended the titles alone. Cagematch.de shows that Stride and Foster won the titles but Steven Sterling is also shown to have taken place in a further title defence, the most plausible explanation being that all three members were recognized as champions under the freebird rule. However, Sterling's reign length remains uncertain.	
14	The Down Boyz (Steve Gipke and Tony Scorese)	October 24, 2014	JCW House show	Union, New Jersey	1	28		
15	The Playaz Club (Damien Darling and Erik Andretti)	November 21, 2014	JCW House show	Howell, NJ	1	168		
16	Joey Janela (2) and Sean Waltman/X-Pac	May 8, 2015	JCW House show	Brick, New Jersey	1	8		
17	EYFBO (Angel Ortiz and Mike Dratzik)	May 16, 2015	Skate And Surf Festival; Night 1	Asbury Park, NJ	1	1		
18	The Beast Squad (Kyle The Beast and Monsta Mack (2))	May 17, 2015	Skate And Surf Festival; Night 2	Asbury Park, NJ	1	228 - 299	The exact length of this reign is uncertain.	
Game Changer Wrestling (GCW)
—	Vacated	January–March 2016	—	—	—	—	Titles were vacated under unknown circumstances somewhere between January and March 12, 2016.	
19	Da Hit Squad (Mafia (3) and Monsta Mack (3))	March 12, 2016	Finals To Crown A Champion	Howell, NJ	2	224	Defeated EYFBO (Santana and Ortiz) to win the vacant titles.	
20	Private Party (Isiah Kassidy and Marq Quen)	October 22, 2016	The Acid Cup	Philadelphia, PA	1	371	This was a four-way tag team match also involving BLKOUT (Ruckus and Robby Mireno and The Nation Of Intoxication (Devon Moore and Lucky 13).	
21	The Rejects (John Wayne Murdoch and Reed Bentley)	October 28, 2017	Worst Behavior	Howell, NJ	1	197	This was a three-way tag team match also involving The Hooligans (Devin Cutter and Mason Cutter).	
22	Los Macizos (Ciclope and Miedo Extremo)	May 13, 2018	The Untouchables	Villa Park, IL	1	1,162		
23	Jimmy Lloyd and G-Raver	July 18, 2021	Zona 23 vs. GCW	Tultitlán, Mexico	1	6		
24	The Second Gear Crew (Mance Warner and Matthew Justice)	July 24, 2021	Homecoming Weekend; Part One	Atlantic City, NJ	1	91		
25	The Briscoes (Jay Briscoe and Mark Briscoe)	October 23, 2021	War Ready	Los Angeles, CA	1	92		
26	The H8 Club (Nick Gage and Matt Tremont)	January 23, 2022	The Wrld on GCW	New York City, NY	1	67		
27	The Briscoes (Jay Briscoe and Mark Briscoe)	March 31, 2022	Joey Janela’s Spring Break 6 Part One	Dallas, TX	2	9	This was a three-way tag team match, which also involving The Second Gear Crew (Mance Warner and Matthew Justice). Slade replaced Matt Tremont in this match, as Tremont was unable to reach the show.	
28	BUSSY (Allie Katch and Effy)	April 9, 2022	Paranoid	Los Angeles, CA	1	111	Katch became the first female to become one half of the tag title	
29	Los Macizos (Ciclope and Miedo Extremo)	July 29, 2022	The People vs. GCW	Nashville, TN	2	15	This was a three-way tag team match, also involving The Second Gear Crew (Mance Warner and Matthew Justice).	
30	The Briscoes (Jay Briscoe and Mark Briscoe)	August 13, 2022	Homecoming; Part 1	Atlantic City, NJ	3	21		
31	Mega Bastards (Alex Colon and John Wayne Murdoch)	September 3, 2022	The Art of War	Hoffman Estates, IL	1	49	This was a five-way WarGames match, also involving BUSSY (Allie Katch and Effy), Los Macizos (Ciclope and Miedo Extremo) and The Second Gear Crew (Mance Warner and Matthew Justice).	
32	Los Macizos (Ciclope and Miedo Extremo)	October 22, 2022	Drop Dead	Detroit, MI	3	134		
33	The Motor City Machine Guns (Alex Shelley and Chris Sabin)	March 5, 2023	Ransom	Atlantic City, NJ	1	26		
34	The East West Express (Jordan Oliver and Nick Wayne)	March 31, 2023	Joey Janela's Spring Break 7	Los Angeles, CA	1	142		
35	Takashi Sasaki and Toru Sugiura	August 20, 2023	Homecoming Weekend 2023	Atlantic City, NJ	1	53		
36	Los Macizos (Ciclope and Miedo Extremo)	October 12, 2023	The Wrld On GCW 2023	Tokyo, Japan	4	23		
37	Violence Is Forever (Dominic Garrini and Kevin Ku)	November 4, 2023	Si Or No?	Atlanta, GA	1	442		
38	Gahbage Daddies (Alec Price and Cole Radrick)	January 19, 2025	The People vs. GCW	New York City, NY	1	69		
39	Violence Is Forever (Dominic Garrini and Kevin Ku)	March 29, 2025	No Compadre	Chicago, IL	2	20	This was a four-way tag team match, also involving Bang And Matthews (August Matthews and Davey Bang), and Hot Commodity (Hayden Backlund and Trevor Outlaw).	
40	YNDP (Alec Price (1) and Jordan Oliver (2))	April 18, 2025	Joey Janela's Spring Break 9	Paradise, NV	1	147		
41	The Brothers of Funstruction (Yabo the Clown and Ruffo the Clown)	September 12, 2025	GCW Evil Deeds	Detroit, MI	1	30	This was a Riddlebox Winners Take All match also for YDNP's JCW Tag Team Championship.	
42	YNDP/Bustah and the Brain (Alec Price (2) and Jordan Oliver (3))	October 12, 2025	GCW Fight Club	Atlantic City, NJ	2	307		
43	KJ Orso and Sam Stackhouse	August 15, 2026	GCW Homecoming Weekend (Night 1)	Atlantic City, NJ	1	95+		

== Combined reigns ==
Current champions KJ Orso and Sam Stackhouse.

As of November 18, 2026.

†	Indicates the current champion
¤	The exact length of at least one title reign is uncertain, so the shortest length is considered.

=== By team ===
Rank	Team	No. of reigns	Combined days
1	Los Macizos (Ciclope and Miedo Extremo)	4	1,334
2	Da Hit Squad (Mafia and Monsta Mack)	2	483
3	Violence Is Forever (Dominic Garrini and Kevin Ku)	2	462
4	YNDP/Bustah and the Brain (Alec Price and Jordan Oliver)	2	454
5	Private Party (Isiah Kassidy and Marq Quen)	1	371
6	The MOB (Nick Niosi and Ricky O)	1	274-387¤
7	The Beast Squad (Kyle The Beast and Monsta Mack)	1	228-299¤
8	The Rejects (John Wayne Murdoch and Reed Bentley)	1	197
9	The Playaz Club (Damien Darling and Erik Andretti)	1	168
10	Los Boricuas (Tony Blaze and Warpath)	2	149-219¤
11	The East West Express (Jordan Oliver and Nick Wayne)	1	142
12	Glitz And Glamour (Jarrett Foster, Steven Sterling and Aaron Stride)	1	133
13	The Briscoes (Jay Briscoe and Mark Briscoe)	3	122
14	BUSSY (Allie Katch and Effy)	1	111
15	KJ Orso and Sam Stackhouse †	1	95+
16	The Second Gear Crew (Mance Warner and Matthew Justice)	1	91
16	Hybrid (Inferno and Wenzel)	1	91
18	The Moondogs 2000 (Moondog Molsonn and Moondog Wenzel)	1	80
19	Gahbage Daddies (Alec Price and Cole Radrick)	1	69
20	The H8 Club (Nick Gage and Matt Tremont)	1	67
21	Team Ethic (Dave Greco and Dixie)	1	56
22	Takashi Sasaki and Toru Sugiura	1	53
23	Mega Bastards (Alex Colon and John Wayne Murdoch)	1	49
24	The Brothers of Funstruction (Yabo the Clown and Ruffo the Clown)	1	30
25	The Down Boyz (Steve Gipke and Tony Scorese)	1	28
26	The Motor City Machine Guns (Alex Shelley and Chris Sabin)	1	26
27	Joey Janela and Sean Waltman/X-Pac	1	8
28	Jimmy Lloyd and G-Raver	1	6
29	EYFBO (Angel Ortiz and Mike Dratzik)	1	1
30	Ace Darling and Matt Striker	1	N/A¤
30	Joey Janela	1	N/A¤
30	Low Ki and Mafia	1	N/A¤
30	The Dirty Rotten Scoundrelz (EC Negro and KC Blade)	1	N/A¤

=== By wrestler ===
Rank	Wrestler	No. of reigns	Combined days
1	Ciclope	4	1,334
1	Miedo Extremo	4	1,334
3	Monsta Mack	3	711-782¤
4	Jordan Oliver	3	596
5	Alec Price	3	523
6	Mafia	3	483¤
7	Dominic Garrini	2	462
7	Kevin Ku	2	462
9	Isiah Kassidy	1	371
9	Marq Quen	1	371
11	Nick Niosi	1	274-387¤
11	Ricky O	1	274-387¤
13	Kyle The Beast	1	228-299¤
14	John Wayne Murdoch	2	246
15	Reed Bentley	1	197
16	Moondog Wenzel/Wenzel	2	171
17	Damien Darling	1	168
17	Erik Andretti	1	168
19	Tony Blaze	2	149-219¤
19	Warpath	2	149-219¤
21	Nick Wayne	1	142
22	Jarrett Foster	1	133
22	Steven Sterling	1	133
22	Aaron Stride	1	133¤
25	Jay Briscoe	3	122
25	Mark Briscoe	3	122
27	Allie Katch	1	111
27	Effy	1	111
29	KJ Orso †	1	95+
29	Sam Stackhouse †	1	95+
31	Inferno	1	91
31	Mance Warner	1	91
31	Matthew Justice	1	91
34	Moondog Molsonn	1	80
35	Cole Radrick	1	69
36	Nick Gage	1	67
36	Matt Tremont	1	67
38	Dave Greco	1	56
38	Dixie	1	56
40	Takashi Sasaki	1	53
40	Toru Sugiura	1	53
42	Alex Colon	1	49
43	Ruffo The Clown	1	30
43	Yabo The Clown	1	30
45	Steve Gipke	1	28
45	Tony Scorese	1	28
47	Alex Shelley	1	26
47	Chris Sabin	1	26
49	Joey Janela	2	8¤
49	Sean Waltman/X-Pac	1	8
51	Jimmy Lloyd	1	6
51	G-Raver	1	6
53	Angel Ortiz	1	1
53	Mike Draztik	1	1
55	Ace Darling	1	N/A¤
55	EC Negro	1	N/A¤
55	KC Blade	1	N/A¤
55	Low Ki	1	N/A¤
55	Matt Striker	1	N/A¤
