= GCW Ultraviolent Championship =

Professional wrestling championship

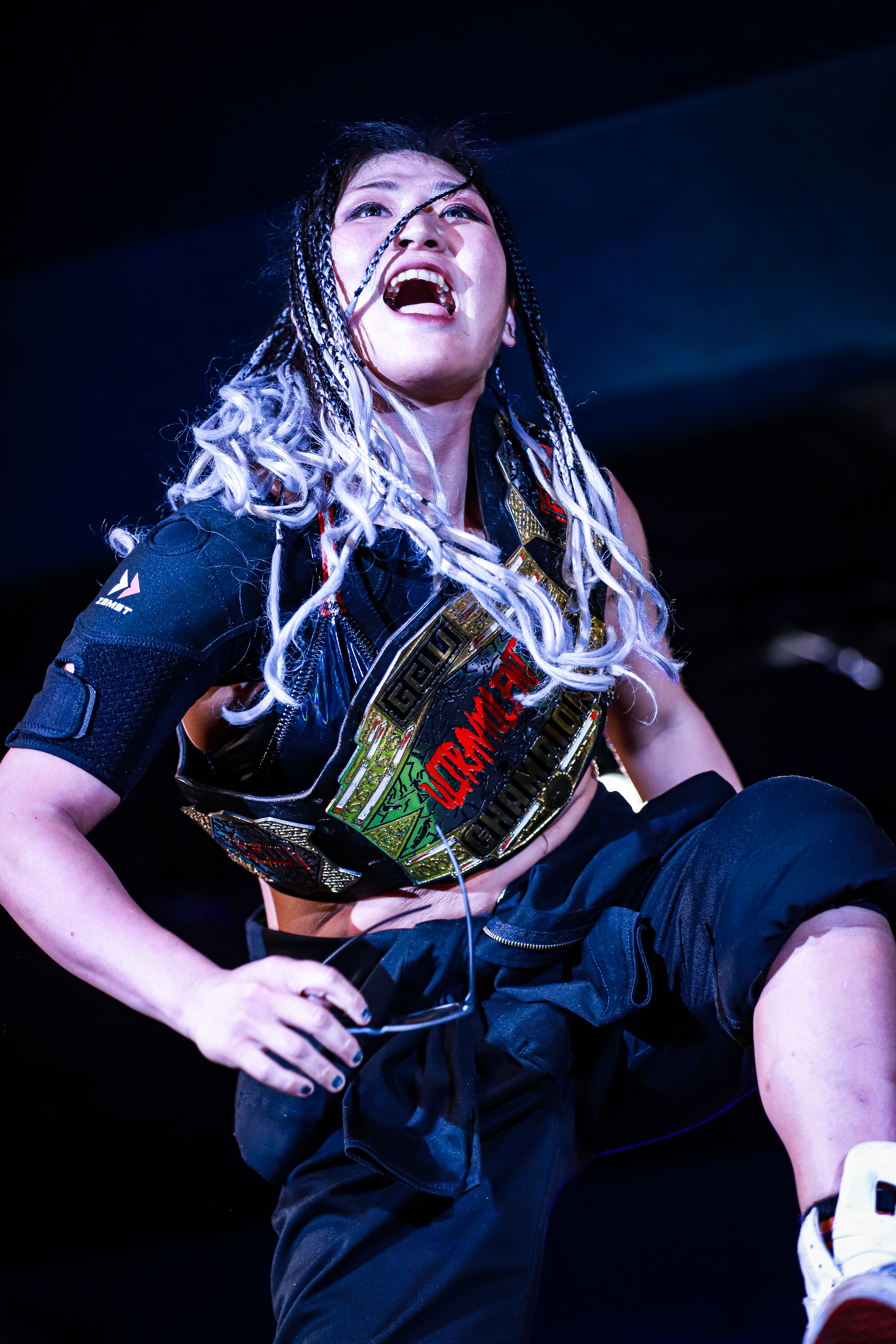
- Rina Yamashita with the current design of the title.

Details
- Promotion: Game Changer Wrestling
- Date established: April 10, 2021
- Current champion: Vipress
- Date won: September 12, 2026

Other names
- GCW Ultraviolent Championship (2021–present); GCW Unified Extreme & Ultraviolent Championship (2025)
Statistics
- First champion: Alex Colon
- Most reigns: Alex Colon (3 reigns)
- Longest reign: Rina Yamashita (791 days)
- Shortest reign: Masashi Takeda (19 days)
- Oldest champion: Matt Tremont (37 years, 54 days)
- Youngest champion: Drew Parker (23 years, 207 days)
- Heaviest champion: Alex Colon (189 lb (86 kg))
- Lightest champion: Rina Yamashita (154 lb (70 kg))

The GCW Ultraviolent Championship is a professional wrestling hardcore championship created and promoted by the American promotion Game Changer Wrestling (GCW). Until January 19, 2025, it was one of the two hardcore championships promoted by the promotion, alongside the GCW Extreme Championship, until both titles was unified, retiring the second one. The title can be won by both male and female wrestlers. The current champion is Vipress, who is in her first reign. She won the title by defeating Otis Cogar at No Signal in the Hills Pt. 5 on September 12, 2026.

== Title history ==
Like most professional wrestling championships, the title is won as a result of a scripted match. Championship matches typically occur on GCW events, though at least one championship match has been promoted by Big Japan Pro Wrestling (BJW).

There have been a total of fourteen reigns shared between ten different champions plus one vacancy. Vipress is the current champion in her first reign. She won the title by defeating Otis Cogar at No Signal in the Hills Pt. 5 in Los Angeles, California, on September 12, 2026.

Key
No.	Overall reign number
Reign	Reign number for the specific champion
Days	Number of days held
+	Current reign is changing daily

No.	Champion	Championship change			Reign statistics		Notes	Ref.
No.	Champion	Date	Event	Location	Reign	Days	Notes	Ref.
1	Alex Colon	April 10, 2021	Planet Death	Ybor City, Florida	1	105	Defeated Lucky 13 to become the inaugural champion.	
2	Drew Parker	July 24, 2021	Homecoming Weekend; Night 1	Atlantic City, New Jersey	1	93	This was a winner-takes-all match where Parker's BJW Deathmatch Heavyweight Championship was also on the line.	
3	Masashi Takeda	October 25, 2021	BJW live event	Tokyo, Japan	1	19		
4	Alex Colon	November 13, 2021	Nick Gage Invitational 6	Summit, Illinois	2	138	This was also the finals of the Nick Gage Invitational 6 Tournament.	
5	John Wayne Murdoch	March 31, 2022	Joey Janela's Spring Break 6 Part 1	Dallas, Texas	1	66		
6	Alex Colon	June 5, 2022	Cage of Survival	Atlantic City, New Jersey	3	69		
7	Rina Yamashita	August 13, 2022	Homecoming; Part 1	Atlantic City, New Jersey	1	791	Yamashita became the first female to hold the championship.	
8	Brandon Kirk	October 12, 2024	Fight Club; Night 1: The Art Of War Games	Atlantic City, New Jersey	1	35		
9	Sawyer Wreck	November 16, 2024	Nick Gage Invitational 9	Orlando, Florida	1	<1	Last match of Sawyer Wreck's career. This was also the finals of the Nick Gage Invitational 9 Tournament.	
—	Vacated	November 16, 2024	Nick Gage Invitational 9	Orlando, Florida	—	—	Sawyer Wreck vacated the championship after her last match in career.	
10	Matt Tremont	January 19, 2025	The People vs. GCW	New York City, New York	1	363	This was a Unification DLC match also including Brandon Kirk, Dr. Redacted, Drew Parker, John Wayne Murdoch, Matthew Justice and Rina Yamashita, alongside Maki Itoh's GCW Extreme Championship on the line.	
11	Otis Cogar	January 17, 2026	Code of the Streets	Dallas, Texas	1	91	This was Cogar's Do or Die Rumble cash-in match, which was contested as a Deathmatch.	
12	Matt Tremont	April 18, 2026	Joey Janela's Spring Break: The Immortal Clusterf*ck	Las Vegas, Nevada	2	50	This was a Hardcore Kingdom Steel Cage match	
13	Otis Cogar	June 7, 2026	Cage of Survival 5	Las Vegas, Nevada	2	97	This was a Cage of Survival match also involving Anakin Murphy, Conor Claxton, Dr. Redacted, Gabby Forza, Jamesen Shook, Jeffrey John, Jimmy Lloyd, Lil Sicko, Lucky 13, Masashi Takeda, and Vipress.	
14	Vipress	September 12, 2026	No Signal in the Hills Pt. 5	Los Angeles, California	1	67+	became the second female to win the title	

== Combined reigns ==
Former two-time champion Otis Cogar shown here with the current design of the title.

As of November 18, 2026.

†	Indicates the current champion

Rank	Wrestler	No. of reigns	Combined days
1	Rina Yamashita	1	791
2	Matt Tremont	2	413
3	Alex Colon	3	312
4	Otis Cogar	2	188
5	Drew Parker	1	93
6	John Wayne Murdoch	1	66
7	Vipress †	1	67+
8	Brandon Kirk	1	35
9	Masashi Takeda	1	19
10	Sawyer Wreck	1	<1
