= Matt Tremont =

American professional wrestler

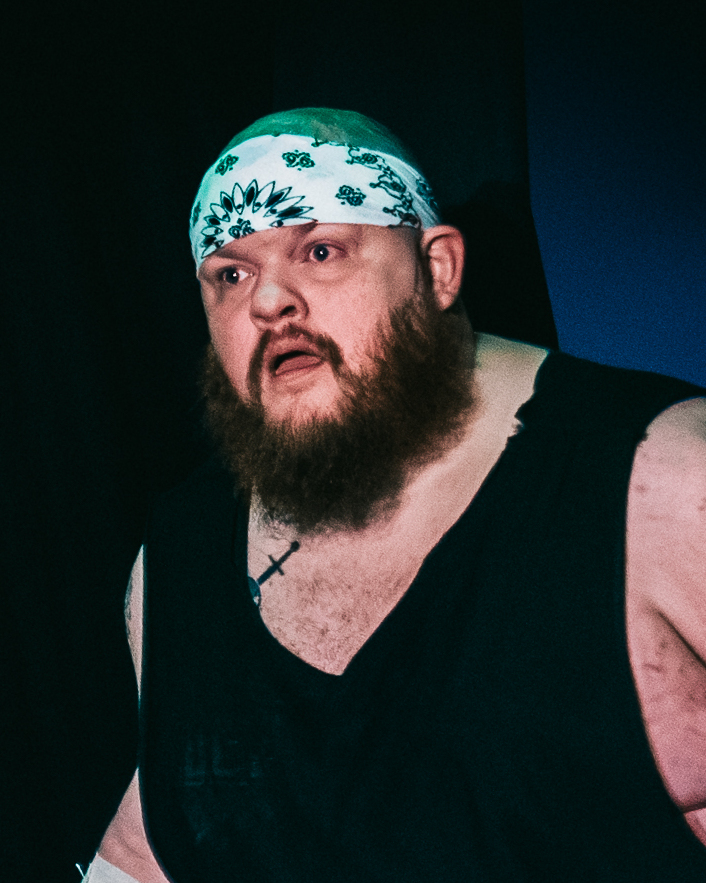
- Tremont in April 2025

Personal information
- Born: Matthew Tremont; March 9, 1989 (age 37) Atlantic City, New Jersey

Professional wrestling career
- Ring name(s): The Bulldozer "Father" Matthew Tremont; Matt Tremont; Killdozer; The Black Abdullah the Butcher
- Billed height: 5 ft 9 in (1.75 m)
- Billed weight: 250 lb (110 kg)
- Billed from: Atlantic City, New Jersey
- Trained by: Pryme Tyme Amy Lee
- Debut: January 27, 2007

Matthew Tremont (born March 9, 1989) is an American professional wrestler and promoter, He currently performs on the independent circuit – predominantly for Game Changer Wrestling (GCW), where he is the former two-time GCW Ultraviolent Champion. He is also a former one-time GCW World Tag Team Champion, with Nick Gage, and the final GCW Extreme Champion.

Among his honours, he is a one-time CZW World Heavyweight Champion and one-time GCW World Champion. He also has the distinction of being the only wrestler to win all the major American deathmatch tournaments: Tournament Of Death once, Masters of Pain once and King of the Deathmatch twice. As such, he is often referred to as "The Grandslam Champion" of deathmatch.

Outside of wrestling, Tremont owns a store in the Berlin Farmers Market called Bulldozer's Collectibles.

== Professional wrestling career ==
=== Combat Zone Wrestling (2011–2019) ===
Tremont made his Combat Zone Wrestling debut at Prelude to Violence defeating Pinkie Sanchez in a Tournament of Death X Qualifying Ultraviolent Rules on June 11, 2011. Tremont made his first Tournament of Death appearance at TOD X, defeating Necro Butcher in a "Water Jugs, Bats & Anything Else you Can Swing Match" in the quarterfinals. He was eliminated by Masada in the semifinals in a "Kenzans, Whips & Anything Else we Can F***ing Find Match". Tremont began a small feud with Danny Havoc at Cage of Death 13 in an Ultraviolent Pits deathmatch which soon culminated at CZW Super Saturday, when Havoc defeated Tremont in an Ultraviolent Rules match. Tremont made his second Tournament of Death appearance at Tournament of Death XI, losing to Abdullah Kobayashi in the first round in an "Ultraviolent Bats" match.

Tremont began to feud with CZW owner D. J. Hyde throughout 2012, beginning at Tangled Web V as Hyde was the victor. He was subsequently fired at Down With The Sickness, after defeating Solo with a very stiff chair shot to the head, ending the bout at 35 seconds. Tremont got back on the microphone and repeated "Redemption" over and over again. At Night of Infamy, Hyde cut a promo on not reinstating Tremont. This prompted the locker room to walk out and quit if Tremont is not reinstated, but Hyde insisted if Tremont wins a match he could be reinstated. He would team up with New Jack the same night, defeating Joe Gacy and Ron Mathis. Tremont was successful at Cage of Death XIV, winning with a Death Valley driver off the top of the cage through three levels of panes of glass and a stage setup on the outside. After the match, the entire locker room congratulated Tremont for his efforts.

He later feuded with Devon Moore and The Nation Of Intoxication leading to several matches between the two. At Tangled Web 7, Tremont defeated Moore in the Tangled Web Match after knocking him off the scaffolding into the ring below.

In early 2015, Tremont began teaming with newcomer Stockade. They fought The Nation Of Intoxication at To Live Is To Die in January, they lost after Tremont accidentally struck Stockade with a chair. After the match, Stockade and Tremont came to blows then Tremont challenged Stockade to an Ultraviolent Match at Sixteen on February 21.

On August 8, 2015, Tremont defeated BLK Jeez for the CZW World Heavyweight Championship. At Down with the Sickness, after a 399-day reign as champion, Tremont lost the title in a four way deathmatch to Jonathan Gresham which also featured Greg Excellent and Joe Gacy.

Tremont would turn heel at Cage of Death 18, by attacking his own teammate Joey Janela during the Cage of Death match, costing his team the match in the process. He later rechristened himself as "Father" Matthew Tremont and reformed his alliance with Stockade. They would go on to attack Janela and Penelope Ford.

On August 5, 2017, Tremont had a No Ropes Barbed Wire Exploding Baseball Bats match against Japanese deathmatch wrestler, Atsushi Onita. The match would end in a No Contest.

On November 26, 2018, Tremont was challenged by D. J. Hyde to a tag team match at Cage of Death XX. He took Onita's help, while Hyde's partner was Masada. On December 9, Tremont and Onita defeated Hyde and Masada, after Hyde was caught in the ropes and Tremont took a cinderblock to his head, pinning him when he fell down.

=== Other promotions ===
Tremont debuted for Beyond Wrestling on night one of Miracle Workers, losing to Devon Moore. He defeated TJ Marconi on day two of Ring Leaders. He now wrestles sporadically for Beyond Wrestling.

Tremont made his IWA Mid-South debut at the 2011 annual King of the Deathmatch, defeating Masada in a Barbed Wire Board, Taipei Death & Sandpaper Kickpads match in the first round. He lost in the finals the second night to Drake Younger, other competitors were Devon Moore and Simon Sezz.

Tremont won his first biggest accomplishment by winning the 2012 Masters of Pain defeating Masada in the finals in a Double Hell Deathmatch in Charleston, West Virginia.

On June 7, 2014, Tremont defeated Patrick Hayes in Connellsville, Pennsylvania to win the Vicious Outcast Wrestling (VOW) Anarchy Championship.

On June 26, 2014, Tremont won the IWA Mid South King Of The Death Matches. His run to the final included defeating Jesse Amato in a Best Of Seven Log Cabin Match, and John Wayne Murdoch and Ron Mathis in a Semi Final Three Way Fans Bring The Weapons Spider Net Match. In the final, he defeated Josh Crane in a No Rope Barbed Wire, Panes Of Glass, Barbed Wire Board, Casket And Fans Bring The Weapons Match, after putting Crane through a flaming pane of glass.

On July 21, 2018, Tremont became the first-ever Synergy Pro Wrestling Champion by defeating KTB in the finals of the promotion's inaugural Championship Tournament in Manville, New Jersey. Tremont held the Synergy Pro Wrestling Championship for 196 days, losing the title to Frightmare in a Triple Threat Match (that also included Drake Chambers) at Synergy Pro Wrestling 8 in Hillsborough, New Jersey.

A documentary about Tremont was released in 2021.

On January 23, 2021, Tremont along with Nick Gage at The Wrld on GCW answered the open challenge of The Briscoe Brothers and captured the GCW Tag Team titles for the first time. Then on February 20, Tremont and Gage successfully defended the tag title against The Rejects (John Wayne Murdoch and Reed Bently) at Don't Tell Me What To Do. On May 1, Tremont defeated Brandon Kirk to qualify for Tournament Of Survival. On June 4 at Tournament of Survival, Tremont defeated Slade and Toru Sugiura in first and Semi-final round respectively, but was defeated in the final by Drew Parker.

0n August 27, 2022, Tremont entered in the 2nd edition of Battle of Tough Guys in ICW No Holds Barred. In the first round, Tremont defeated his student Chris Bradley, but got eliminated in the second round by HoodFoot.

On December 30, 2022 at IMTV Class'22, Tremont entered and win a gauntlet match to become the IMTV Independent Wrestling World Champion. He defended his title successfully against Jaden Newman and Sidney Bakabella on H2O: Sunday Night of Champions and Beyond Might Show on January 22 and 29 respectively.

On April 16, 2023, at Deadlock Pro Wrestling Live 2, Tremont and Marcus Mathers challenged VIF (Dominic Garrini and Kevin Ku) for their tag title but was unsuccessful. On June 3, at GCW Tournament Of Survival 8, Tremont enter in the TOS 8 Tournament but was defeated in first round by John Wayne Murdoch. On July 7, Tremont entered in the AWR Asylum Deathmatch Tournament, where he defeated Jimmy Lyon and Alex Stretch in the first and semi-final round respectively but came up short in final losing to Hoodfoot, this match also involved Dale Patricks and Brad Cash. On December 30, 2023 Tremont entered in the third edition of Battle Of Tough Guys but was eliminated in the First round by Jaden Newman.

On August 4, 2025 at Beyond Americana: The Perfect Day, Tremont lost the IMTV Independent Title to Alec Price.

== Championships and accomplishments ==
- Evolution Pro Wrestling
  - EPW Openweight Championship (1 time)
- Interspecies Wrestling
  - ISW Undisputed King Of Crazy Championship (1 time)
- Combat Zone Wrestling
  - CZW World Heavyweight Championship (1 time)
  - CZW Tournament Of Death 14 (2015)
- Crimson Crown Wrestling
  - Crimson Cup (2019)
- Deathmatch Downunder
  - DMDU World Deathmatch Championship (1 time, current)
- Game Changer Wrestling
  - GCW World Championship (1 time)
  - GCW Extreme Championship (1 time, final)
  - GCW Ultraviolent Championship (2 time)
  - GCW Tag Team Championship (1 time) – with Nick Gage
  - GCW Nick Gage Invitational 2 (2017)
  - GCW Tournament Of Survival X (2025)
- H2O Wrestling: Hardcore Hustle Organization
  - H2O Heavyweight Championship (1 time)
- IWA East Coast
  - Masters of Pain (2012)
- IWA Deep South
  - Carnage Cup 9 (2013)
- IWA Mid-South
  - King of the Deathmatch (2014, 2015)
- ICW No Holds Barred
  - ICW American Deathmatch World Championship (1 time)
- IndependentWrestling.tv
  - IWTV Independent Wrestling World Championship (1 time)
- Juggalo Championship Wrestling
  - JCW Heavyweight Championship (1 time)
- Pro Wrestling Illustrated
  - Ranked No. 82 of the top 500 singles wrestlers in the PWI 500 in 2025
- Synergy Professional Wrestling
  - Synergy Pro Wrestling Championship (1 time, inaugural)
  - Synergy Pro Wrestling Championship Tournament (2018)
- Superstars of Wrestling Federation
  - SWF Hardcore Championship (1 time)
- Tier 1 Wrestling
  - Tier 1 Tag Team Championship (1 time) – with Stockade
- Vicious Outcast Wrestling
  - VOW Anarchy Championship (2 times)
  - VOW Hyper Sonic Championship (1 times)
  - VOW Lord Of Anarchy Tournament (2015)
- Women Superstars Uncensored
  - Queen and King of the Ring (2014) – with Mickie Knuckles
