= GCW World Championship =

Professional wrestling championship

- Current design of the title (2021-present)

Details
- Promotion: Game Changer Wrestling
- Date established: April 14, 2000
- Current champion: Atticus Cogar
- Date won: November 7, 2026

Other names
- JCW Championship (2000–2004, 2013–2015); GCW World Championship (2015–present); Undisputed GCW World Championship (2024)
Statistics
- First champion: Andrew Anderson
- Most reigns: Nick Gage (4 reigns)
- Longest reign: Nick Gage (722 days)
- Shortest reign: Joey Janela (Second reign, 3 minutes)
- Oldest champion: Nick Gage (43 years, 254 days)
- Youngest champion: Low Ki (20 years, 229 days)
- Heaviest champion: Don Montoya (299 lbs)
- Lightest champion: Masha Slamovich (136 lbs)

The GCW World Championship is a professional wrestling world championship created and promoted by the American promotion Game Changer Wrestling (GCW). It is the promotion's top championship for singles competitors. Andrew Anderson was the inaugural champion. The current champion is Atticus Cogar, who is in his second reign. He won the title by defeating Joseph Sawyer in a No Rules match at The Crossroads on August 15, 2026.

== Title history ==
=== Names ===
| Name | Years |
|---|---|
| JCW Heavyweight Championship | April 4, 2000 – December 31, 2004; November 9, 2013 – July 1, 2015 |
| GCW World Championship | July 1, 2015 – present |

=== Reigns ===
As of November 9, 2026.

There have been a total of 31 reigns shared between 27 different champions and three vacancies. Andrew Anderson was the inaugural champion. Nick Gage has the most reigns at four, with his first being the longest at 722 days, while AJ Gray, "Broski" Jimmy Lloyd, Joey Janela (In his second reign), and Nick Gage (in his fourth reign), have the shortest reigns at less than a day. Gage is the oldest champion when he won it at 43 years old, while Low Ki is the youngest champion at 20 years old.

Atticus Cogar is the current champion in his second reign. He won the title by defeating Joseph Sawyer in a No Rules match at The Crossroads in Indianapolis, Indiana, on August 15, 2026.

Key
| No. | Overall reign number |
| Reign | Reign number for the specific champion |
| Days | Number of days held |
| + | Current reign is changing daily |

| No. | Champion | Championship change | | | Reign statistics | | Notes | Ref. |
| No. | Champion | Date | Event | Location | Reign | Days | Notes | Ref. |
|---|---|---|---|---|---|---|---|---|
Jersey Championship Wrestling (JCW)
| 1 | Andrew Anderson | April 14, 2000 | JCW House show | Garfield, NJ | 1 | 8 | Defeated Nick Maddox in a tournament final to become the inaugural champion. | |
| 2 | Low Ki | April 22, 2000 | JCW House show | Elmwood Park, NJ | 1 | 181 | | |
| 3 | Reckless Youth | October 20, 2000 | Battle at Becton | East Rutherford, NJ | 1 | 142 | | |
| — | Vacated | November 3, 2001 | — | — | — | — | Reckless Youth vacated the championship due to inactivity. | |
| 4 | Inferno | November 3, 2001 | JCW House show | South River, NJ | 1 | 322 | Inferno was awarded the vacant championship. | |
| 5 | Crowbar | September 21, 2002 | It's the Big One | Elizabeth, NJ | 1 | 28 | | |
| 6 | Lance Diamond | October 19, 2002 | JCW House show | Elizabeth, NJ | 1 | 141 | | |
| 7 | Don Montoya | March 9, 2003 | Skin to Win | Paramus, NJ | 1 | 112 | This was a No Disqualification match. | |
| 8 | Ace Darling | June 29, 2003 | For Family and Friends | Paramus, NJ | 1 | 147 | | |
| 9 | Slyck Wagner Brown | November 23, 2003 | Crazy 8 | Garfield, NJ | 1 | 217 | | |
| 10 | Homicide | June 27, 2004 | Jersey J-Cup | Garfield, NJ | 1 | 187 | | |
| — | Deactivated | December 31, 2004 | — | — | — | — | Homicide was no longer listed as the JCW Champion after the company shut down in 2004. | |
| 11 | Damien Darling | November 9, 2013 | Playas Club Collide | Hasbrouck Heights, NJ | 1 | 209 | Defeated Erik Andretti to win the vacant championship. | |
| 12 | Q. T. Marshall | June 6, 2014 | JCW House show | Barnegat Township, NJ | 1 | 168 | | |
| 13 | Joey Janela | November 21, 2014 | JCW House show | Howell Township, NJ | 1 | 204 | | |
| 14 | Tama Tonga | June 13, 2015 | JCW Six Flags event | Jackson Township, NJ | 1 | 182 | During Tama Tonga's reign, Jersey Championship Wrestling was renamed to Game Changer Wrestling, so their respective championships were also renamed. | |
Game Changer Wrestling (GCW)
| — | Vacated | December 12, 2015 | — | — | — | — | Tama Tonga vacated the championship due to inactivity. | |
| 15 | Kyle the Beast | March 12, 2016 | To Crown A Champion | Howell Township, NJ | 1 | 350 | Defeated Joe Gacy, Joey Janela and Pinkie Sanchez in a tournament final four-way match to win the vacant championship. | |
| 16 | Matt Tremont | February 25, 2017 | The New Face of War | Howell Township, NJ | 1 | 294 | This was a Last Man Standing match. | |
| 17 | Nick Gage | December 16, 2017 | Ready to Die: The 2nd Anniversary | Howell Township, NJ | 1 | 722 | This was a Three Layers of Hell match. | |
| 18 | AJ Gray | December 8, 2019 | Long. Live. GCW. | Nashville, TN | 1 | <1 | | |
| 19 | Rickey Shane Page | December 8, 2019 | Long. Live. GCW. | Nashville, TN | 1 | 488 | | |
| 20 | Nick Gage | April 9, 2021 | rSpring Break Presented by 44OH! | Ybor City, FL | 2 | 106 | This was a Death match. | |
| 21 | Matt Cardona | July 24, 2021 | Homecoming; Night 1 | Atlantic City, NJ | 1 | 42 | This was a Death match. During his reign, Cardona referred to the title as the "GCW Universal Championship". | |
| 22 | Jon Moxley | September 4, 2021 | The Art of War Games | Hoffman Estates, IL | 1 | 399 | | |
| 23 | Nick Gage | October 8, 2022 | Fight Club; Night 1 | Atlantic City, NJ | 3 | 160 | This was a Title vs. Career match. | |
| 24 | Masha Slamovich | March 17, 2023 | Eye for an Eye | New York, NY | 1 | 79 | Slamovich became the first woman to win the championship. | |
| 25 | Blake Christian | June 4, 2023 | Cage of Survival 2 | Atlantic City, NJ | 1 | 356 | This was a Cage of Survival match also featuring Rina Yamashita. | |
| — | Vacated | May 25, 2024 | Take A Picture | Chicago, IL | — | — | Blake Christian was stripped of the title due to his participation in the Best of the Super Juniors 31 and not being able to defend the title at Cage of Survival 3. | |
| 26 | Joey Janela | June 2, 2024 | Cage of Survival 3 | Atlantic City, NJ | 2 | <1 | Last eliminated "Broski" Jimmy Lloyd in the Gauntlet of Survival. | |
| 27 | Mance Warner | June 2, 2024 | Cage of Survival 3 | Atlantic City, NJ | 1 | 231 | Warner cashed in his Do or Die contract. | |
| 28 | Effy | January 19, 2025 | The People vs. GCW | New York, NY | 1 | 307 | | |
| 29 | Atticus Cogar | November 22, 2025 | Dream On | East Rutherford, NJ | 1 | 266 | This was a three-way match also involving Charles Mason. | |
| 30 | Joseph Sawyer | August 15, 2026 | Homecoming Weekend (Night 1) | Atlantic City, NJ | 1 | 84 | | |
| 31 | Atticus Cogar | November 7, 2026 | The Crossroads | Indianapolis, IN | 2 | 2+ | This was a No Rules match. | |

== Combined reigns ==
As of November 9, 2026

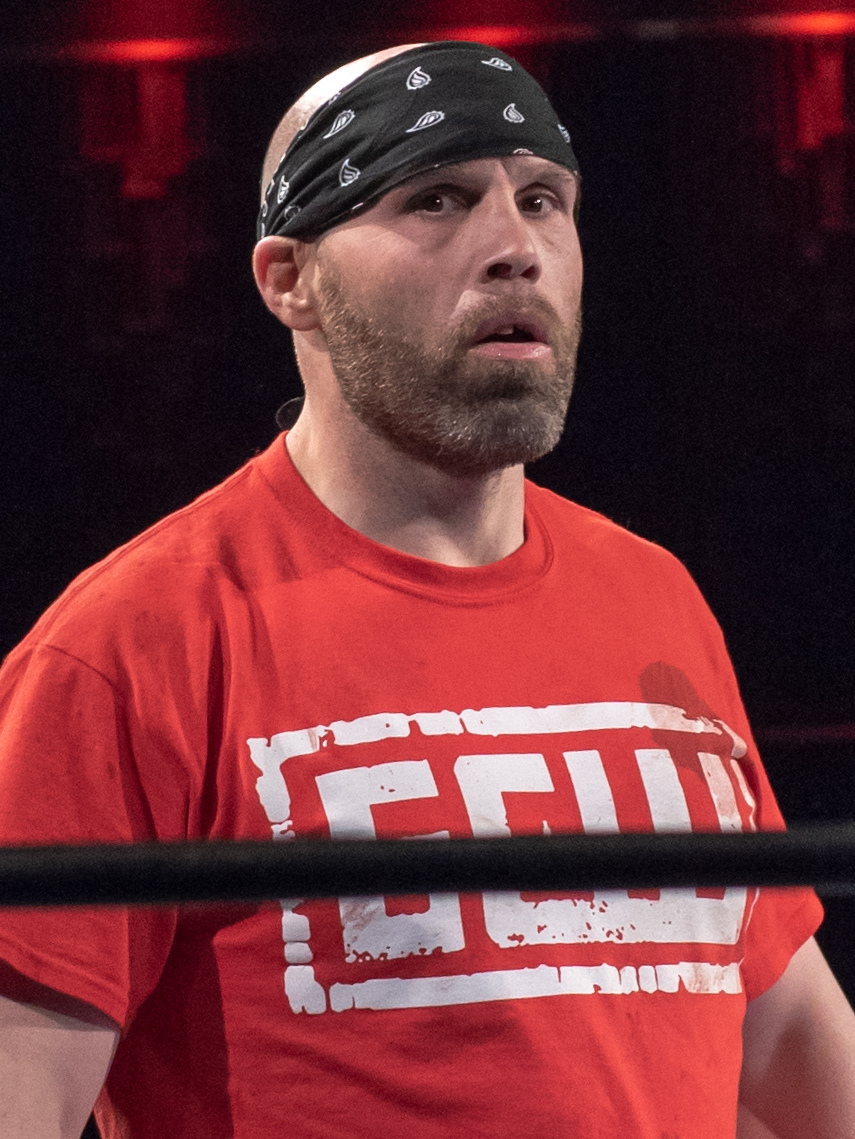
Record-setting four-time champion Nick Gage has the longest singular reign at 722 days, and the longest combined reign at 988 days.

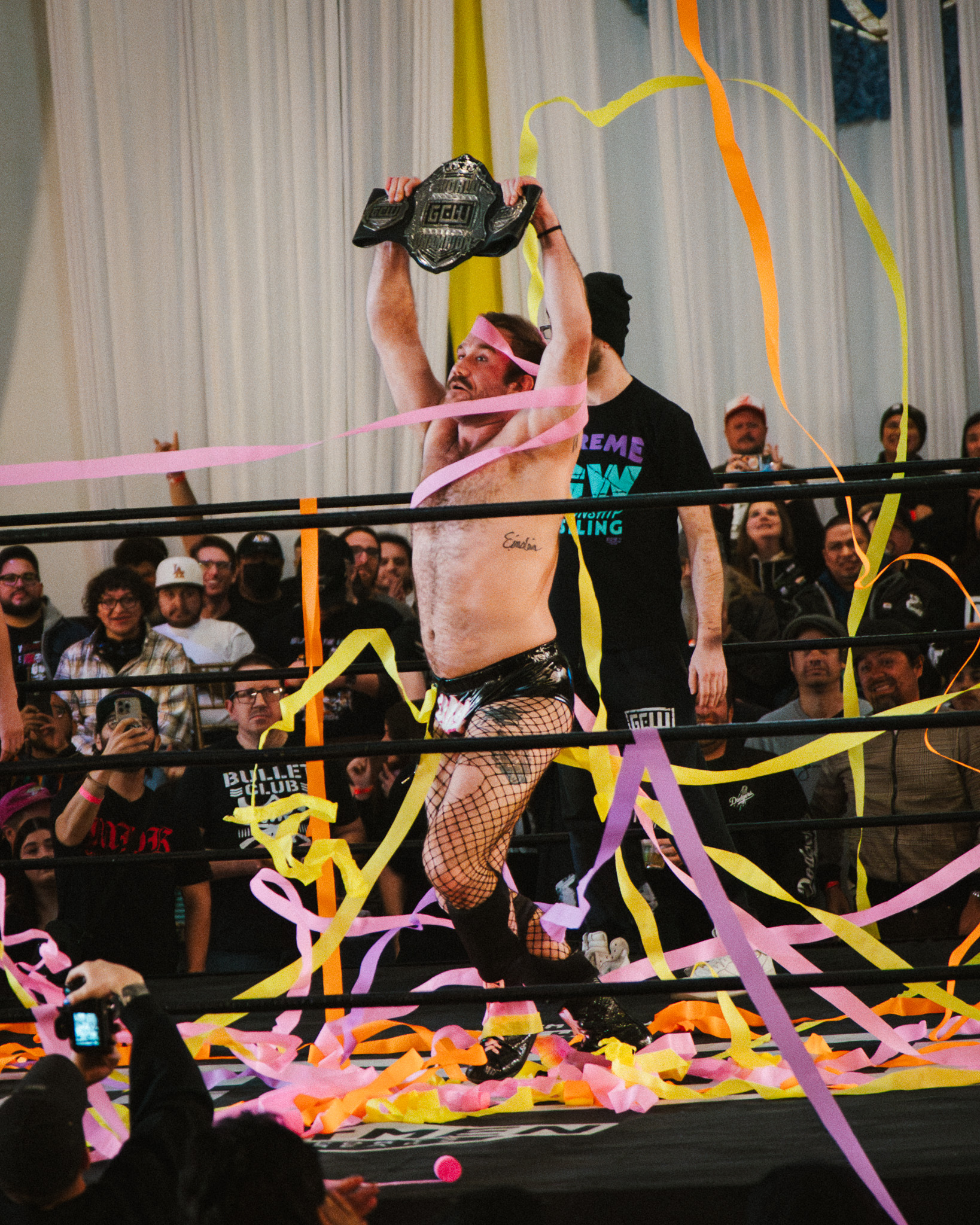
One-time champion Effy shown here with the current design of the title.

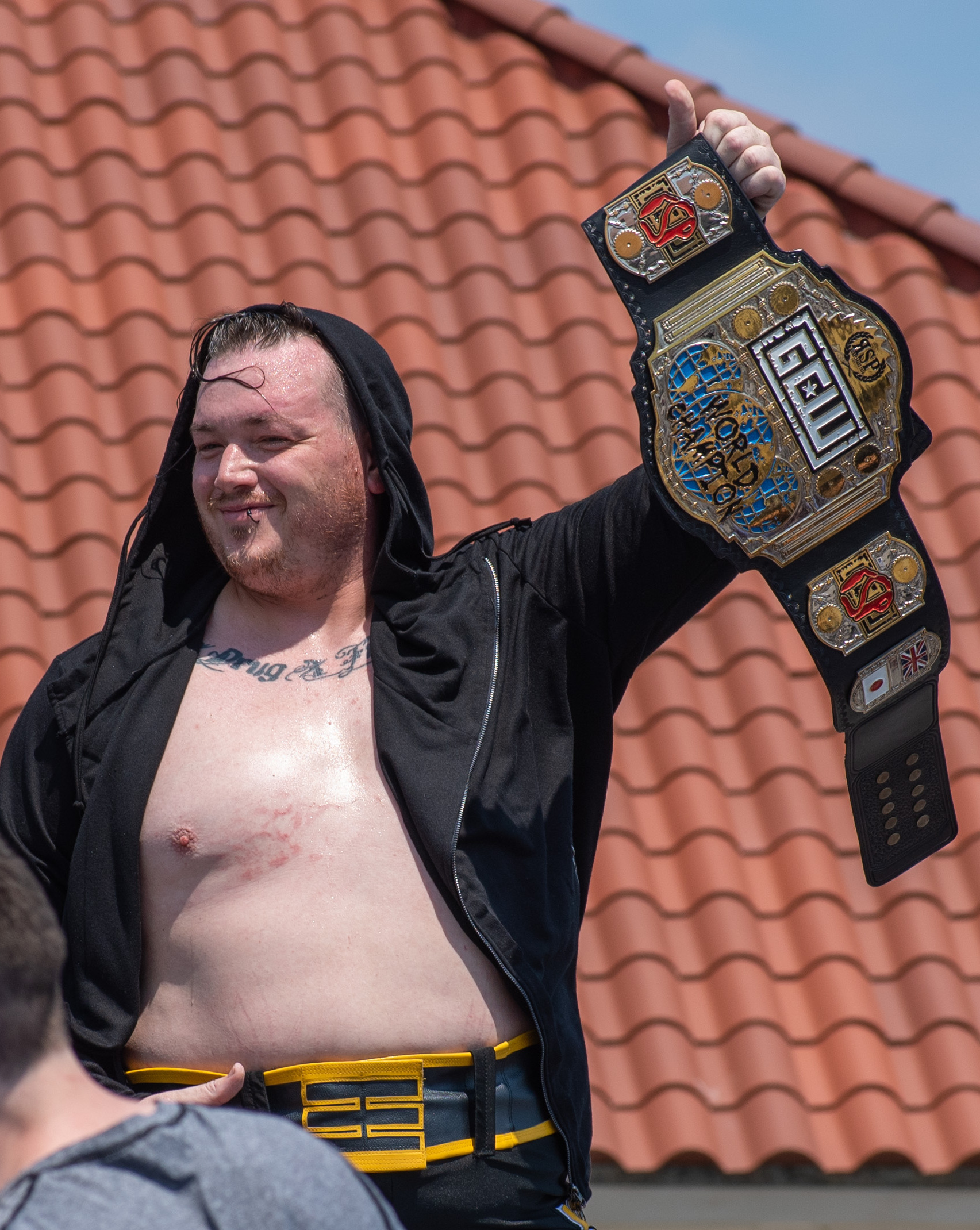
Former champion Rickey Shane Page shown here with the previous design of the title.

| † | Indicates the current champion |

| Rank | Wrestler | No. of reigns | Combined days |
|---|---|---|---|
| 1 | Nick Gage | 4 | 988 |
| 2 | Rickey Shane Page | 1 | 488 |
| 3 | Jon Moxley | 1 | 399 |
| 4 | Reckless Youth | 1 | 379 |
| 5 | Blake Christian | 1 | 356 |
| 6 | Kyle the Beast | 1 | 350 |
| 7 | Inferno | 1 | 322 |
| 8 | Effy | 1 | 307 |
| 9 | Matt Tremont | 1 | 294 |
| 10 | Atticus Cogar | 2 | 268+ |
| 11 | Mance Warner | 1 | 231 |
| 12 | Slyck Wagner Brown | 1 | 217 |
| 13 | Damien Darling | 1 | 207 |
| 14 | Joey Janela | 2 | 204 |
| 15 | Homicide | 1 | 187 |
| 16 | Tama Tonga | 1 | 182 |
| 17 | Low Ki | 1 | 181 |
| 18 | Q. T. Marshall | 1 | 168 |
| 19 | Ace Darling | 1 | 147 |
| 20 | Lance Diamond | 1 | 141 |
| 21 | Don Montoya | 1 | 112 |
| 22 | Joseph Sawyer | 1 | 84 |
| 23 | Masha Slamovich | 1 | 79 |
| 24 | Matt Cardona | 1 | 42 |
| 25 | Crowbar | 1 | 28 |
| 26 | Andrew Anderson | 1 | 8 |
| 27 | AJ Gray | 1 | <1 |
| 27 | "Broski" Jimmy Lloyd | 1 | <1 |
