= Effy (wrestler) =

American professional wrestler

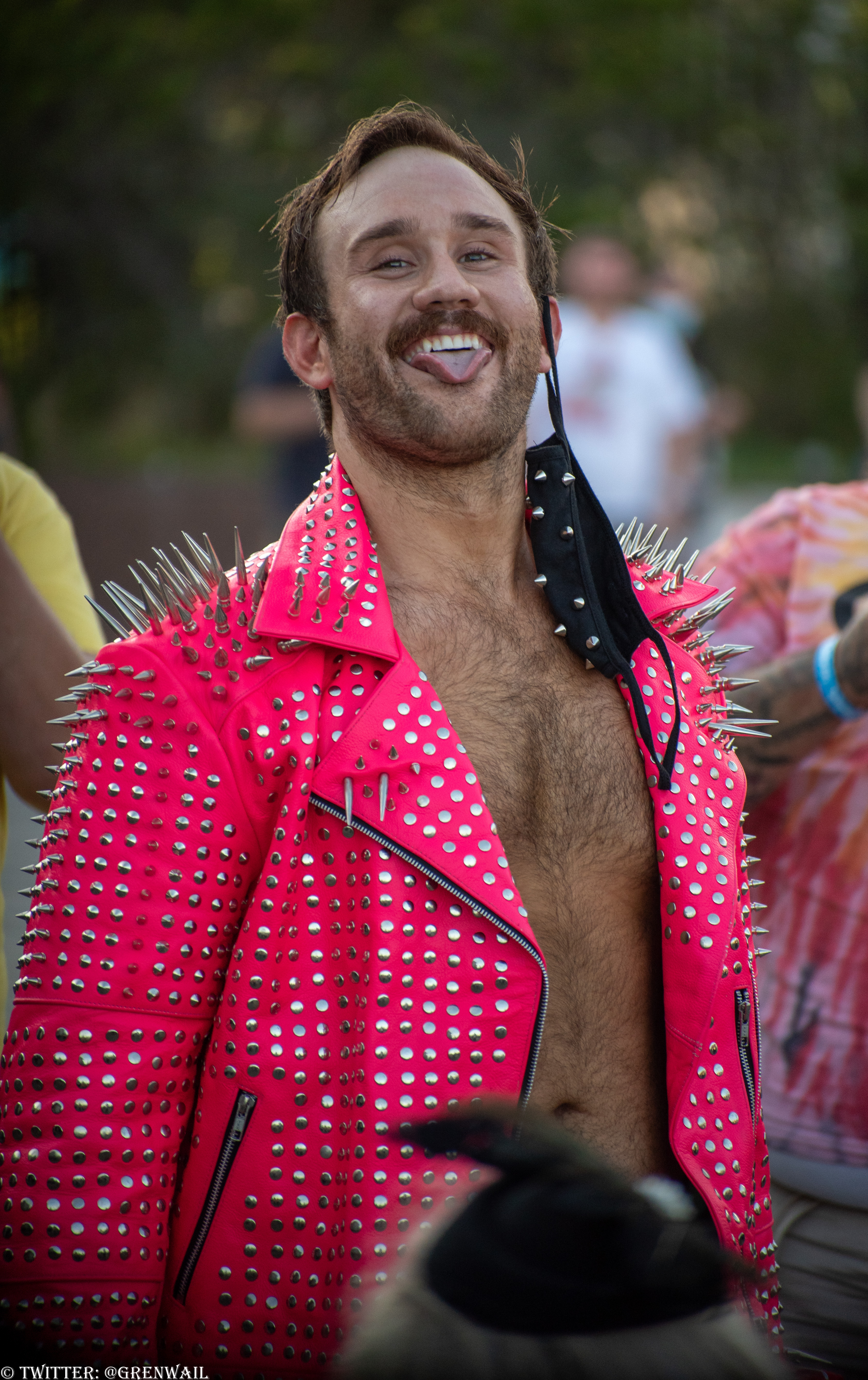
- Effy in July 2020

Personal information
- Born: Taylor Gibson; June 7, 1990 (age 36) Tallahassee, Florida, United States

Professional wrestling career
- Ring name(s): Effy; Effy Gibbes; FE Davidson
- Billed height: 6 ft 2 in (188 cm)
- Billed weight: 229 lb (104 kg)
- Trained by: Steve Hetrick
- Debut: 2014

Taylor Gibson (born June 7, 1990), better known by the ring name Effy, is an American professional wrestler. He currently works for Game Changer Wrestling (GCW), where he is a former GCW World Champion and GCW Tag Team Champion with Allie Katch. He also promotes the GCW-branded Effy's Big Gay Brunch events, focused on LGBTQ wrestlers in the American independent scene.

== Personal life ==
Taylor Gibson was raised in a very religious environment; two of his grandparents were preachers. Gibson is openly gay and is known for his support of the LGBTQ community. He has stated that his sexual orientation has cost him several bookings. His mother wrote a book called "Wrestling With a Rebel: When Your Son Flips Your World Upside Down" about his formative years.

== Professional wrestling career ==
On August 30, 2019, Effy faced Nick Gage for the GCW World Championship in a Deathmatch. Despite losing the match, he would become a regular performer for the Game Changer Wrestling promotion. On October 2, 2021, Effy defeated Matt Cardona to win the Internet Championship.

On October 10, 2020, Gibson hosted Effy's Big Gay Brunch, the first of a series of shows featuring LGBTQ performers and allies. On April 10, 2021, he hosted Effy's Big Gay Brunch 2.

On April 9, 2022, at Paranoid, Effy and Allie Katch won the GCW Tag Team Championship. On July 29, at The People vs. GCW, they lost the titles to Los Mazicos (Ciclope and Miedo Extremo) in a five-way WarGames match.

== Professional wrestling style and persona ==
Gibson described the Effy character as an over-the-top version of himself. Since he began to work in a religious and Republican part of the United States, he performed the "most gay version of myself" to get heat. He is nicknamed "The Weapon of Sass Destruction".

== Championships and accomplishments ==
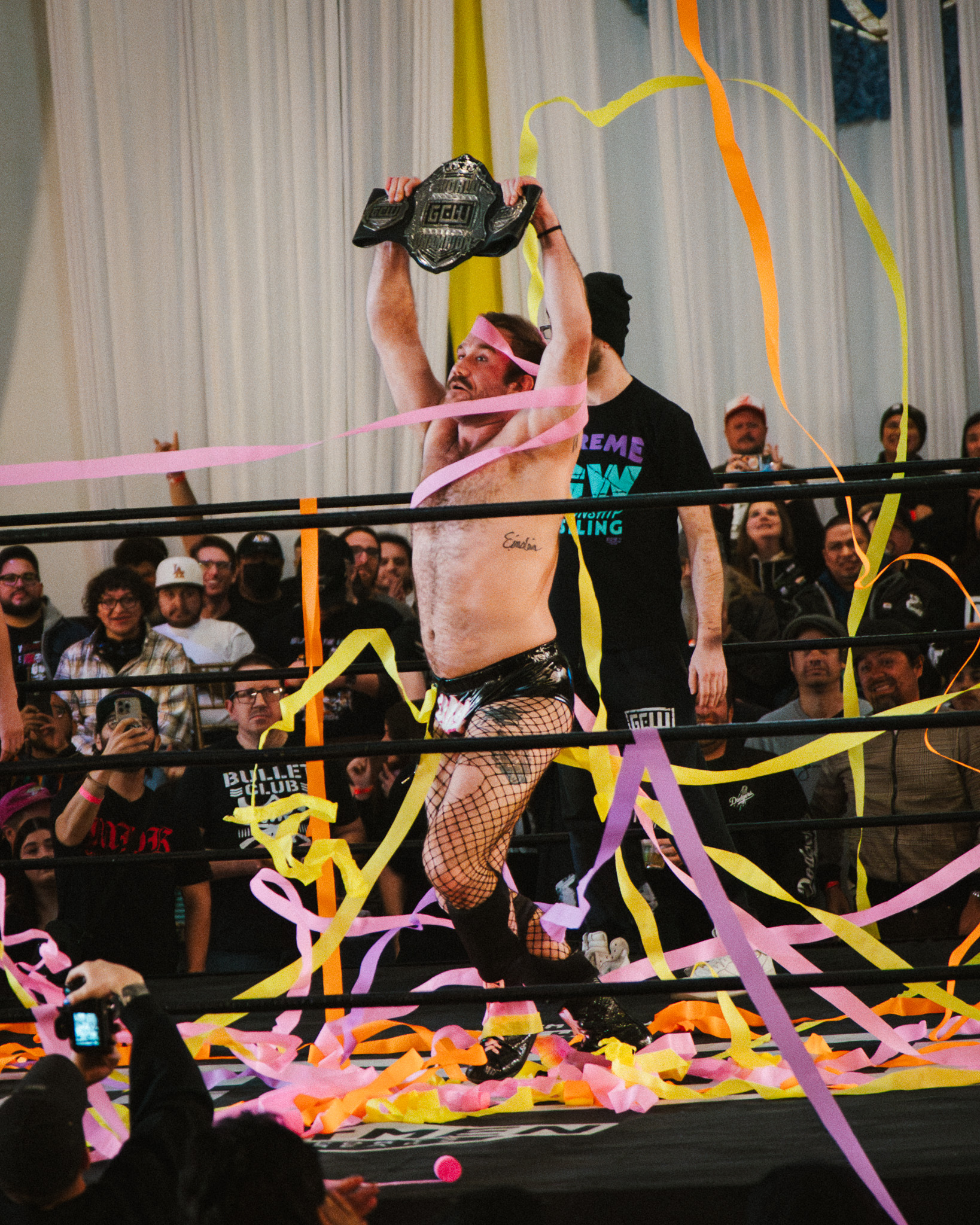
In Game Changer Wrestling, Gibson is a one-time GCW World Champion.

- All-Star Wrestling Network
  - AWN Heritage Championship (1 time)
- Atlanta Wrestling Entertainment
  - AWE Tag Team Championship (1 time) – with Ashton Starr
- DDT Pro-Wrestling
  - Ironman Heavymetalweight Championship (1 time)
- Destiny Christian Championship Wrestling
  - DCCW United States Championship (1 time)
- Elev8 Pro
  - Elev8 Pro Championship (1 time)
- FEST Wrestling
  - FEST Wrestling Championship (2 times)
- Freelance Wrestling
  - Freelance Tag Team Championship (1 times) – with Allie Katch
- Game Changer Wrestling
  - GCW World Championship (1 time)
  - GCW Tag Team Championship (1 time) – with Allie Katch
- Inspire Pro Wrestling
  - Inspire Pro Pure Prestige Championship (1 time)
  - NWA Deep South Heavyweight Championship (1 time)
- Party Hard Wrestling
  - PHW Charizona State Championship (1 time)
  - PHW Legacy Championship (1 time)
- Prime Time Pro Wrestling
  - PTPW 51st State Championship (1 time, inaugural, final)
  - Invitational Grand Prix Tournament Of Tournaments Classic International (2020)
- Pro Wrestling Illustrated
  - Ranked No. 42 of the top 500 singles wrestlers in the PWI 500 in 2025
- Other titles
  - Internet Championship (1 time)
