= Game Changer Wrestling =

American professional wrestling promotion

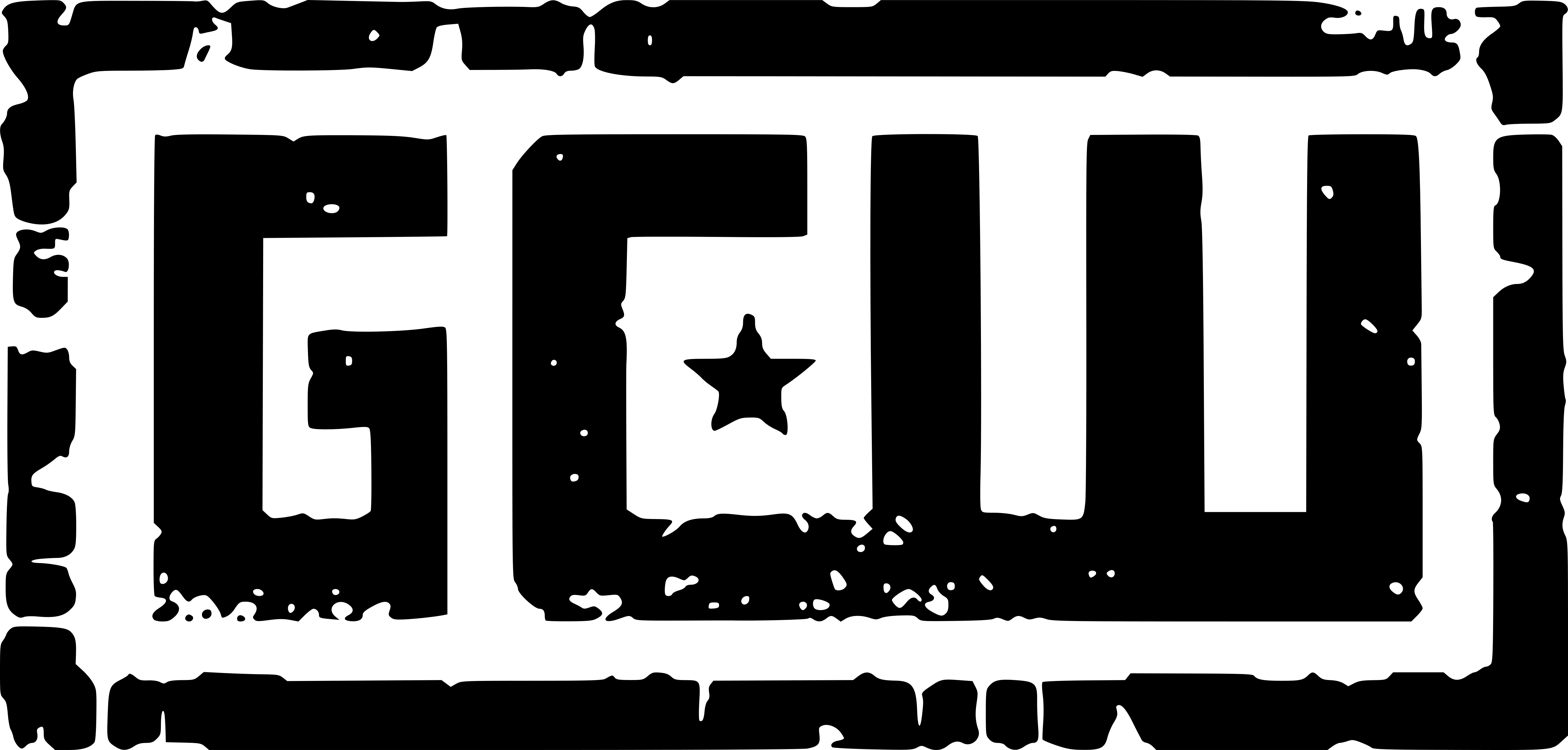
- Acronym: GCW
- Founded: January 1999 (original); September 2013 (revival)
- Style: Hardcore wrestling; Shoot style wrestling
- Headquarters: New Jersey, U.S.
- Founder: Ricky Otazu
- Owner(s): Ricky Otazu (1999–2004, 2013–2015); Brett Lauderdale and Danny Demanto (2015–2019); Brett Lauderdale (2019–present)
- Formerly: Jersey Championship Wrestling (1999–2015)
- Website: Official website

Game Changer Wrestling (GCW), formerly known as Jersey Championship Wrestling (JCW), (Note: The Jersey Championship Wrestling (JCW) name is currently used by GCW as the name of their secondary brand. The modern JCW promotion runs a series of streaming events on YouTube under GCW.) is an American independent professional wrestling promotion based in New Jersey. The promotion was originally founded by Ricky Otazu in 1999; it was rebranded under its current name in 2015, after a sale to Danny Demanto and current owner Brett Lauderdale. The promotion specializes in hardcore wrestling, as well as mixed martial arts–inspired shoot style matches.

GCW has grown from running shows based in New Jersey, to holding events across the United States, as well as internationally in Canada, United Kingdom, Japan, Australia, Germany, France, Italy, and Mexico. Annual GCW events include Backyard Wrestling, Bloodsport, Joey Janela's Spring Break, the NGI, and the Tournament of Survival.

== History ==
=== As Jersey Championship Wrestling ===
Jersey Championship Wrestling (JCW) was founded by independent wrestler Ricky Otazu, also known by his ring name of Ricky O, in January 1999 in New Jersey. JCW ran their first show on January 29, 2000, in Lyndhurst, New Jersey. Later that year, JCW hosted the inaugural Jersey J-Cup, which featured many of the top independent wrestlers of that period. They would continue to host the tournament until 2004, when JCW was sold to rival company National Wrestling Superstars (NWS).

The promotion would remain dormant for nearly a decade until September 2013 when, after the closure of National Wrestling Superstars, Otazu reclaimed the rights to JCW and reopened the promotion. In April 2014, JCW opened its own training school in North Bergen. Later that year, JCW would return to hosting the Jersey J-Cup.

=== 2015–present: Rebranding as Game Changer Wrestling ===
In June 2015, Jersey Championship Wrestling rebranded itself to Game Changer Wrestling (GCW) after being purchased by Brett Lauderdale and Danny Demanto. Since the buyout, GCW began to predominantly feature hardcore wrestling and continued to enjoy success in the New Jersey wrestling scene. GCW became known for producing several tournaments featuring independent wrestlers; including the Nick Gage Invitational Ultraviolent Tournament, the Tournament of Survival and the Acid Cup.

In March 2017, GCW produced Joey Janela's Spring Break show in Fern Park, Florida. This would become an annual tradition for the company. GCW would begin to expand throughout the United States and hosted its first show in Los Angeles in November 2018, titled Joey Janela's LA Confidential. In April 2018, GCW partnered with Matt Riddle to produce Matt Riddle's Bloodsport, a show that fused professional wrestling and mixed martial arts. Bloodsport would take place twice more in 2019, this time with the partnership of Josh Barnett. In August 2019, GCW embarked on a two-day tour of Japan.

In August 2018, GCW began simulcasting their events on both IndependentWrestling.tv (IWTV) and Triller TV, then in December 2020, GCW moved to end their partnership with IWTV, later moving their content exclusively to Triller TV. In 2021, IWTV sued GCW for breach of contract. An out of court settlement was reached that involved GCW producing a series of 8 events exclusively on IWTV, dubbed the "Settlement Series", they were primarily afternoon events held prior to major JCW and GCW shows, and featuring younger low card talent.

In May 2021, Lauderdale relaunched the JCW name as a separate brand, holding smaller events in the afternoon of major GCW shows, and utilizing more younger and unknown talent that have not yet debuted for GCW.

Current logo for Jersey Championship Wrestling

Logo for LA Fights

On October 14, 2021, GCW announced that they would be launching a west coast companion brand called "LA Fights" and confirmed that they would hold the first event under the brand on November 28, 2021.

On January 23, 2022, GCW held the sold out The Wrld on GCW event, their debut at the Hammerstein Ballroom. The event marked the first GCW event to air on traditional pay-per-view outlets.

On February 7, 2022, GCW signed Nick Gage to a contract, which was referred to as "the first and only contract that GCW will offer". GCW owner Brett Lauderdale said of the contract, "This is a major milestone moment for both Nick and GCW. I have always been against the idea of contracts in GCW but there are exceptions to every rule. From day 1, Nick has put his body, and literally his life on the line for the fans inside the squared circle. He deserves, and has earned the right to be rewarded for 20+ years of hard work and sacrifice. This historic contract will do just that, allowing him to continue his in-ring career at a pace that is beneficial to his health, while beginning to focus on opportunities that take him towards the next phase of his career. GCW would not have achieved the level of success it has without Nick F'N Gage, and we are proud to be able to say that GCW will remain Nick's home for the rest of his career".

In October 2022, Lauderdale signed a guaranteed rights deal with Triller TV to become a part of Triller's new subscription based service "Triller TV+", moving GCW events from a PPV business model to a monthly subscription based model. The promotion became the most prominent wrestling company to be featured on Triller TV+.

GCW returned to Japan in September 2022 with 3 sold out shows in conjunction with Pro Wrestling FREEDOMS, they returned again in 2023 for 2 tours, and debuted in Korakuen Hall on October 12, 2023 with "The Wrld on GCW 2023", streaming the event live on Triller TV, GCW thus became the first American wrestling company to ever broadcast live from Korakuen Hall. Subsequent Japan events have been held in conjunction with DDT Pro-Wrestling, including a return to Korakuen Hall on July 30, 2025.

On April 12, 2023, GCW announced a working relationship with Westside Xtreme Wrestling (wXw), which saw GCW hold their inaugural events in Germany as part of wXw's 2023 World Tag Team Festival weekend.

On September 14, 2024, GCW began a partnership with the Detroit-based promotion Juggalo Championship Wrestling in which the two promotions would have a feud which concluded at JCW vs. GCW: The 2 Day War at the 2025 Gathering of the Juggalos.

On October 29, 2024, Nick Gage, GCW's sole contracted wrestler, announced that he was departing GCW. Nick returned to GCW on May 2, 2026 at their "One Night Only" event at the 2300 Arena.

== Roster ==
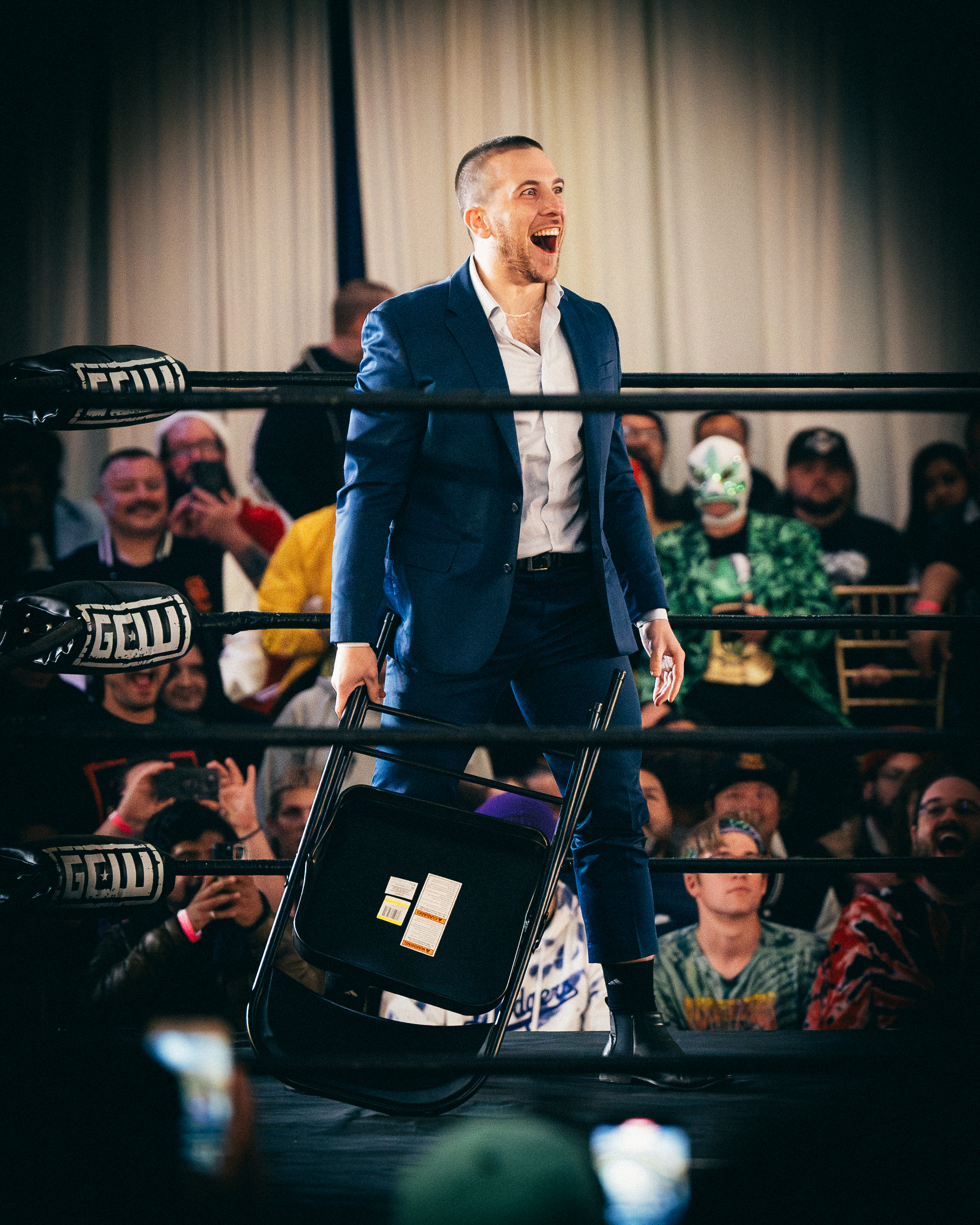
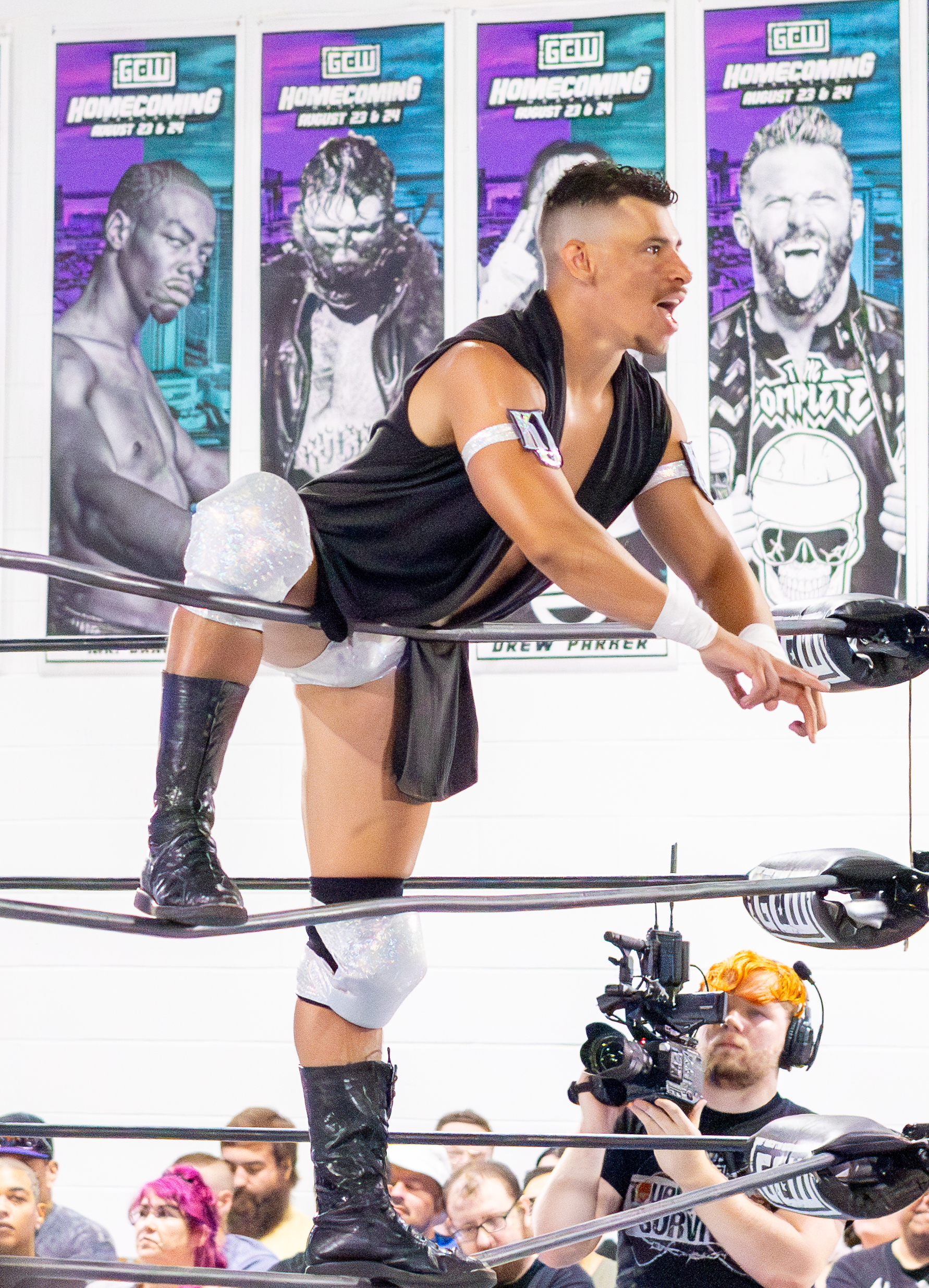
From left: Atticus Cogar, Charles Mason, and KJ Orso.

=== Wrestlers ===
Ring name	Real name	Notes
1 Called Manders	Steve Manders	
Anakin Murphy	Unknown	
Atticus Cogar	Unknown	GCW World Champion
August Matthews	Unknown	
Bam Sullivan	Unknown	
Bear Bronson	Joseph Fitzpatrick	
Beastman	Unknown	
Billie Starkz	Lilian Bridget	
Bobby Flaco	Unknown	
Brooke Havok	Savannah Ruiz	
Charles Mason	Unknown	JCW World Champion
Charlie Tiger	Unknown	
Christian Napier	Unknown	
Ciclope	Jhonny Serrano Yedra	
CPA	Unknown	
Dark Sheik	Sam Khandaghabadi	
Davey Bang	Unknown	
Dominic Garrini	Dominic Garrini	
Don Freeze	Unknown	
Dr. Redacted	Unknown	
Effy	Taylor Gibson	
Gabby Forza	Unknown	
Gary Jay	Unknown	
Griffin McCoy	Unknown	
Grim Reefer	Kevin Corcoran	
Gringo Loco	Charles Santos	
Jack Cartwheel	Jack Summit	WWE ID prospect
Jay Lucas	Unknown	
Jeffrey John	Unknown	
Jimmy Lloyd	James Marchese	
Joey Janela	Joseph Janela	
John Wayne Murdoch	Unknown	
Josh Barnett	Joshua Lawrence Barnett	
Juni Underwood	Unknown	
Kevin Ku	Kevin Ku	
Kerry Morton	Kerry Morton	
KJ Orso	Keith Orso	GCW World Tag Team Champion
Látigo	Unknown	
Lil Sicko	Unknown	
Logan Cavazos	Unknown	
Mad Dog Connelly	Unknown	
Maki Itoh	Maki Itoh	
Man Like DeReiss	DeReiss Gordon	
Mance Warner	Unknown	
Marcus Mathers	Unknown	WWE ID prospect
Matt Makowski	Unknown	
Matt Tremont	Matthew Tremont	Deathmatch Hall of Famer
Megan Bayne	Megan Doheny	
Miedo Extremo	Jonathan Uriel Gijon Perez	
Mr. Danger	Unknown	
Nate Webb	Unknown	
Nick Gage	Nick Gage	
Nixi XS	Unknown	
Otis Cogar	Unknown	
Parrow	Mike Parrow	
Ray Jaz	Unknown	
Reed Bentley	Unknown	
Richard Holliday	Joe Zimbardi	
Rina Yamashita	Rina Yamashita	
"Flyin" Ryan O'Neill	Unknown	
Sam Stackhouse	Sam Moore	GCW World Tag Team Champion
Santana Jackson	Unknown	
Sidney Akeem	Sidney Bateman	
Shane Mercer	Shane Goode	
Shotzi Blackheart	Unknown	
SLADE	Unknown	
Starboy Charlie	Charlie Hilder	
Steph De Lander	Stephanie De Landre	
Terry Yaki	Unknown	
Thomas Shire	Unknown	
Tony Deppen	Anthony Deppen	
Vengador	Unknown	
Vipress	Unknown	Ultraviolent Champion

=== Referees ===
Ring name	Real name	Notes
Adam Gault	Adam Gault	Senior referee
Chad Rico	Chad Rico	
Dan Perch	Dan Perch	
Max Recon	AJ Kissinger	
Scarlette Donovan	Scarlette Donovan	

=== Broadcast team ===
Ring name	Real name	Notes
Dave Prazak	Dave Prazak	Commentator; Indie Wrestling Hall of Famer
Emil Jay	Emil Hibian	Commentator; Ring announcer
Jordan Castle	Jordan Cassel	Commentator
Mose	John Mosely	Commentator
Nick Maniwa	Nick Glenn	Commentator
Nick Knowledge	Nicholas Knowledge	JCW Commentator
Rob Sanderson	Rob Sanderson	Commentator
Veda Scott	Unknown	Commentator; Occasional wrestler

=== Other personnel ===
Ring name	Real name	Notes
Brett Lauderdale	Brett Hoffman	Owner / Booker
Chad Minnes	Chad Minnes	Operations Manager
Chris Huffman	Chris Huffman	Graphic Designer
Ivan Firejay	Ivan Firejay	Video Producer
Johnathan Ashe	Johnathan Ashe	EP / Head of Production
Jon Pine	Jon Pine	Production Assistant
Matt Borruso	Matt Borruso	Production Manager

== Halls of fame ==
=== Deathmatch Hall of Fame ===
Year	Ring name
2019	Mad Man Pondo
2019	Nate Hatred
2019	Danny Havoc
2019	Matt Tremont
2021	Supreme
2021	Eugene
2021	Nick Mondo
2022	Wifebeater
2022	Toby Klein
2022	Dewey Donovan
2022	J. C. Bailey
2023	Mike "Piss Jug Mike" Bieszck
2023	Lowlife Louie
2023	John Zandig
2023	Brain Damage
2024	Abdullah the Butcher
2024	Markus Crane
2024	Gary Walter
2025	2 Tuff Tony
2025	Jeff Cannonball
2025	Mean And Hard (Mean Mitch Page and Rollin' Hard)
2025	Scrawny Shawny
2026	Megumi Kudo
2026	Iceman
2026	Dysfunction
2026	Masashi Takeda

== Championships and accomplishments ==
=== Current championships ===
As of November 16, 2026

Championship	Current champion(s)	Reign	Date won	Days held	Location	Notes	Ref.
GCW World Championship	Atticus Cogar	2	November 7, 2026	9	Indianapolis, IN	Defeated Joseph Sawyer at GCW The Crossroads.	
JCW World Championship	Gabby Forza	1	October 18, 2026	29	Ridgefield Park, NJ	Defeated Charles Mason at JCW A Nightmare in Bergen County.	
GCW Ultraviolent Championship	Vipress	1	September 12, 2026	65	Los Angeles, California	Defeated Otis Cogar at No Signal in the Hills Pt. 5.	
GCW Tag Team Championship	KJ Orso and Sam Stackhouse	1	August 15, 2026	93	Atlantic City, NJ	Defeated Bustah and the Brain (Alec Price and Jordan Oliver) on Night 1 of GCW Homecoming's Weekend.	

=== Former championships ===
Championship	Date of entry	First champion(s)	Date retired	Final champion(s)	Years active	Event
GCW Extreme Championship	September 13, 2013	Bandido Jr.	January 19, 2025	Matt Tremont	12	The People vs. GCW
GCW Women's Championship	November 23, 2003	April Hunter	June 3, 2016	Deonna Purrazzo	13	Live event
JCW Light Heavyweight Championship	April 14, 2000	Judas Young	April 10, 2004	Kahagas	4	Live event
JCW Television Championship	April 14, 2000	Kevin Knight	February 22, 2004	Moondog Wenzel	4	Live event
JCW Six Man Tag Team Championship	November 4, 2000	CJ Brock, Crazy Ivan, and Dave Greco	November 4, 2001	CJ Brock, Crazy Ivan, and Dave Greco	1	Payback Time
