= CannonballFest =

2025 Game Changer Wrestling livestreaming event

- Promotional poster
- Promotion: Game Changer Wrestling
- Date: September 14, 2025
- City: New Providence, New Jersey
- Venue: New Providence High School

Game Changer Wrestling event chronology
← Previous; Rumble on the River	Next → Keep In Touch

CannonballFest, also known by its full name, CannonballFest: A Benefit To Raise Money For Jeff Cannonball's Fight Against ALS, was a professional wrestling livestreaming event produced by Game Changer Wrestling (GCW). The show took place on September 14, 2025, at the New Providence High School in New Providence, New Jersey, and was streamed live on YouTube and featured wrestlers from the independent circuit and All Elite Wrestling (AEW). The show was also a benefit show for GCW wrestler Jeff Cannonball, who had been diagnosed with amyotrophic lateral sclerosis (ALS).

== Production ==
=== Background ===
In May 2025, Jeff Cannonball, an independent professional wrestler who had been working with GCW since 2015 along with several independent and hardcore promotions such as Combat Zone Wrestling (CZW), Frontier Martial Arts Wrestling (FMW), and Limitless Wrestling, had been diagnosed with amyotrophic lateral sclerosis and had set up a GoFundMe page to cover the costs of his treatment. On June 3, 2025, Mark Cuban, minority owner of the Dallas Mavericks and host of Shark Tank, announced that he had donated $10,000 to support Cannonball in his fight against ALS. On June 7, 2025, Cannonball was inducted into GCW's Deathmatch Hall of Fame. On June 16, 2025, Joey Janela announced on his social media accounts that GCW would be holding a CannonballFest benefit show to raise money for Cannonball and his family. In addition to the announcement of the event, All Elite Wrestling (AEW) wrestler MJF was announced to be making an appearance at the show. On September 10, 2025, Cody Rhodes, Darby Allin, Roman Reigns, Brody King, and Danhausen donated various items including ring gear, mystery boxes, action figures, and more during a charity auction.

=== Storylines ===
CannonballFest featured professional wrestling matches that involves different wrestlers from pre-existing scripted feuds and storylines. Wrestlers portrayed villains, heroes, or less distinguishable characters in scripted events that built tension and culminated in a wrestling match or series of matches. Storylines were produced on Game Changer Wrestling's various pay-per-view events.

=== Aftermath ===
In total, over $40,000 was raised in support of Jeff Cannonball's treatment in his fight against ALS. On October 8, 2026, Cannonball had died at the age of 39.

== Results ==
No.	Results	Stipulations
1	Mike Santana defeated Bear Bronson by pinfall	Singles match
2	GCW WorkHorses (Jordan Oliver, Man Like DeReiss, Marcus Mathers, and Masha Slamovich) defeated Team JAPW Worldwide (Archadia, Azrieal, Dan Barry, and Eric Corvis) by pinfall	Eight-man tag team match
3	Megan Bayne defeated Joey Janela by pinfall	Singles match
4	Willow Nightingale defeated Tony Deppen by pinfall	Singles match
5	Team Terra (Cheeseburger, LSG, Matt Mako, Terra Calaway, Tracy Williams, and Wheeler Yuta) defeated The Incoherent Legion of Rot (Delirious, Frightmare, Hallowicked, Kodama, Obariyon, and UltraMantis Black) by pinfall	Twelve-man tag team match
6	Crowbar, George Gatton, Lowlife Louie, and Shlak defeated Danny Demanto, Jimmy Lloyd, KTB, and Ron Voyage by pinfall	Singles match
7	Jeffrey The Giraffe defeated Alf, Austin Luke, Ava Everett, Bobby Dempsey, CPA, Deathcolt, Dick Justice, Gabby Ortiz, King Crab, Krist Worthless, Marc Angel, Martin Hughes, Merlok, Rocket, Ryan Mooney, Ryan O’Neill, Sean Henderson, Smiley, Stan Stylez, Tom LaRosa, Twitch, and Tyler Murphy	Battle royal for the Jeff Cannonball King Of Ugly Championship
8	Mike Bailey defeated Matt Tremont by pinfall	Singles match
