= Masada (wrestler) =

American professional wrestler (born 1981)

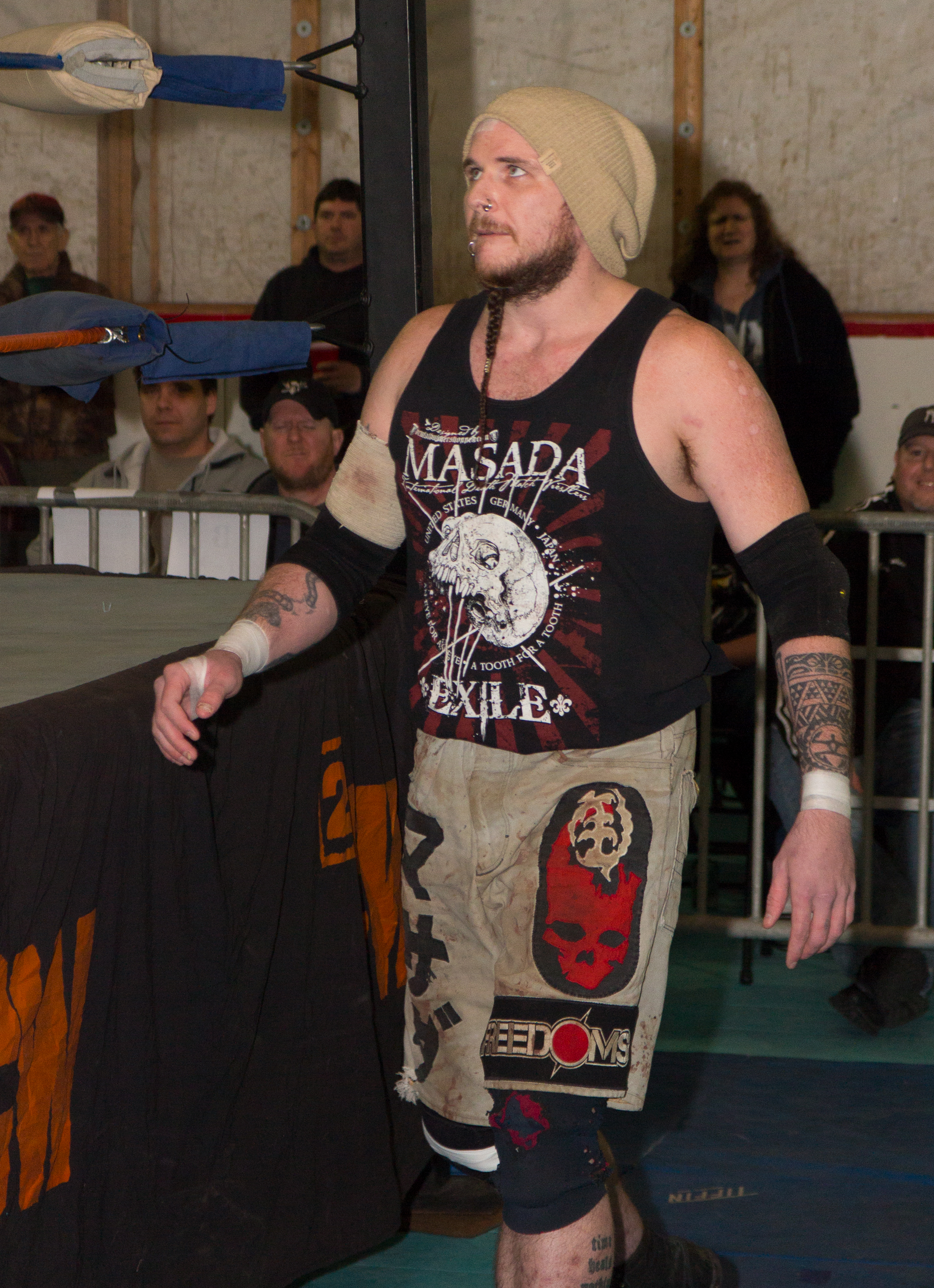
- Masada in 2013

Personal information
- Born: Brigham Paul Doane; June 16, 1981 (age 45) Waco, Texas, U.S.

Professional wrestling career
- Ring name: Masada
- Billed height: 6 ft 2 in (1.88 m)
- Billed weight: 230 lb (100 kg)
- Billed from: Waco, Texas
- Trained by: Texas Wrestling Academy
- Debut: 1999

Brigham Paul Doane (born June 16, 1981), better known by his ring name Masada, is an American professional wrestler known for his time competing in Xtreme Pro Wrestling, where he is a former XPW World Heavyweight Champion, and Combat Zone Wrestling, where he is a former CZW World Heavyweight Champion.

He is best known for his appearances in Ring of Honor (ROH), Combat Zone Wrestling (CZW), Anarchy Championship Wrestling (ACW), Westside Xtreme Wrestling (wXw), Full Impact Pro (FIP), NWA Wildside, and his tours with Big Japan Pro Wrestling (BJW). He has also wrestled matches for World Wrestling Entertainment (WWE), Total Nonstop Action Wrestling (TNA), Game Changer Wrestling (GCW) and All Elite Wrestling (AEW). Masada is a former CZW World Heavyweight Champion, which he held simultaneously with the CZW Ultraviolent Underground Championship.

== Career ==
=== Early years ===
Doane was trained by Steve Oubre at the Coastal Wrestling Academy in Orange, Texas, Rudy Boy Gonzalez and Shawn Michaels at the Texas Wrestling Academy. He then began his professional career by debuting in the Coastal States Wrestling Alliance (CSWA) before moving to Ring of Honor as a member of The Carnage Crew with HC Loc, DeVito, and later Justin Credible. Together, they would wrestle a number of tag matches. He also wrestled in six-man mayhem matches and proved that despite his size, he could still move quickly and keep up with the smaller competitors. At At Our Best, Masada and the rest of The Carnage Crew (accompanied by Dusty Rhodes) won the second ever Scramble Cage in the main event against Special K, who The Carnage Crew had been feuding with. However, The Carnage Crew's celebration with Rhodes was cut short in the locker room as it was discovered that somebody had defecated in the bags of Loc and DeVito.

Two months later, at Generation Next, it was revealed that Masada and his new partner Danny Daniels were responsible for the transgressions. That night, he and Daniels formed a team called The New and Improved Carnage Crew and defeated the original Carnage Crew. This new team left Loc and DeVito wondering why Masada turned on them, and also wondering what Daniels has against them. The Carnage Crew wanted revenge, but DeVito was injured and told Loc to wait for him to return until taking out his anger. During this time, Masada and Daniels looked impressive as a team, however, when DeVito returned the two teams would meet. At Reborn: Completion, The Carnage Crew defeated The New and Improved Carnage Crew for the rights to use the Carnage Crew name in what turned out to be Masada's last match in ROH.

Along with ROH, Masada wrestled for many other companies. He wrestled alongside Jared Steele and Delirious against 3 Live Kru in a dark match for TNA as well against Maven on WWE Heat. Masada also wrestled for IWA Mid-South, Full Impact Pro, and NWA Wildside, where he won the Tag Team championship with Todd Sexton. Masada wrestled in BJW also, feuding with Ryuji Ito.

=== Deathmatch exploits ===
On December 25, 2008, Masada had an extremely bloody deathmatch involving razor blades against Jun Kasai in Apache Pro-Wrestling. He wrestled in the IWA Mid-South King of the Deathmatches 2009, winning the tournament in a bloody final which also included Necro Butcher, Thumbtack Jack and Dysfunction. He wrestled in the CZW Tournament of Death: Rewind losing to Thumbtack Jack in the finals. Masada defended the Anarchy Championship Wrestling World Hardcore Championship against Jerry Lynn on August 22, 2010 in Austin Texas. After a nearly two-year reign, Masada lost the title to Matthew Palmer at Guilty by Association 6 in a Scaffold Match. On June 25, 2011, Masada became only the second wrestler (behind Necro Butcher) to win both IWA-MS's "King of the Deathmatches" and CZW's "Tournament of Death". On July 9, 2011, Masada defeated Danny Havoc for the CZW Ultraviolent Underground Championship. On March 10, 2012, Masada won the CZW World Heavyweight Championship after defeating previous champion Scotty Vortekz, D. J. Hyde and Devon Moore in a four-way match. On June 23, 2012, Masada defeated Drake Younger to win the 2012 CZW Tournament of Death. With the victory, Masada became the first wrestler to win the tournament in consecutive years while also being the first wrestler to win the tournament while being the World Heavyweight Champion, even after he won the CZW Tournament of Death: Europe to make him the only wrestler to win the CZW Tournament of Death on 3 back-to-back occasions. On August 10, 2013, Masada lost the CZW World Heavyweight Championship to Drew Gulak, thus ending his historic reign of 518 days, which would be the 5th longest reign in that entire history of the Title. On September 5, 2015, Masada won the GCW's Nick Gage Invitational defeating Corporal Robinson in the first round, defeating Nate Hatred in the Semifinals, and then defeating Danny Havoc in the final. On January 9, 2016, Masada returned to Ring of Honor and unsuccessfully challenged Roderick Strong for the ROH World Television Championship. On November 7, 2020 Masada lost in the finals of GCW NGI 5 to Mance Warner. He defeated AJ Gray in the first round and defeated Shane Mercer in the semifinals.

=== Xtreme Pro Wrestling ===
Masada joined the revived Xtreme Pro Wrestling in 2021, competing at their Rebirth event on November 7, 2021. In a tournament to crown a new XPW World Heavyweight Champion, Masada defeated Rhino in the quarterfinals, but lost to Willie Mack in the semifinals. Masada participated in the 16-person King of the Deathmatch tournament at Killafornia on April 9, 2022. Masada defeated Lucky 13, Pagano and Big f'n Joe, but ultimately lost to SHLAK in the final to determine a new XPW King of the Deathmatch Champion. On June 25, 2022, Masada defeated Extremo at Beautiful Disaster. On August 13, 2022, Masada won the XPW World Heavyweight Championship at Night of Reckoning in a three-way dance with Brian Cage and Willie Mack before defending it against the likes of Vampiro, Willie Mack, Drake Younger, and others before losing it to Alex Colon.

== Championships and accomplishments ==
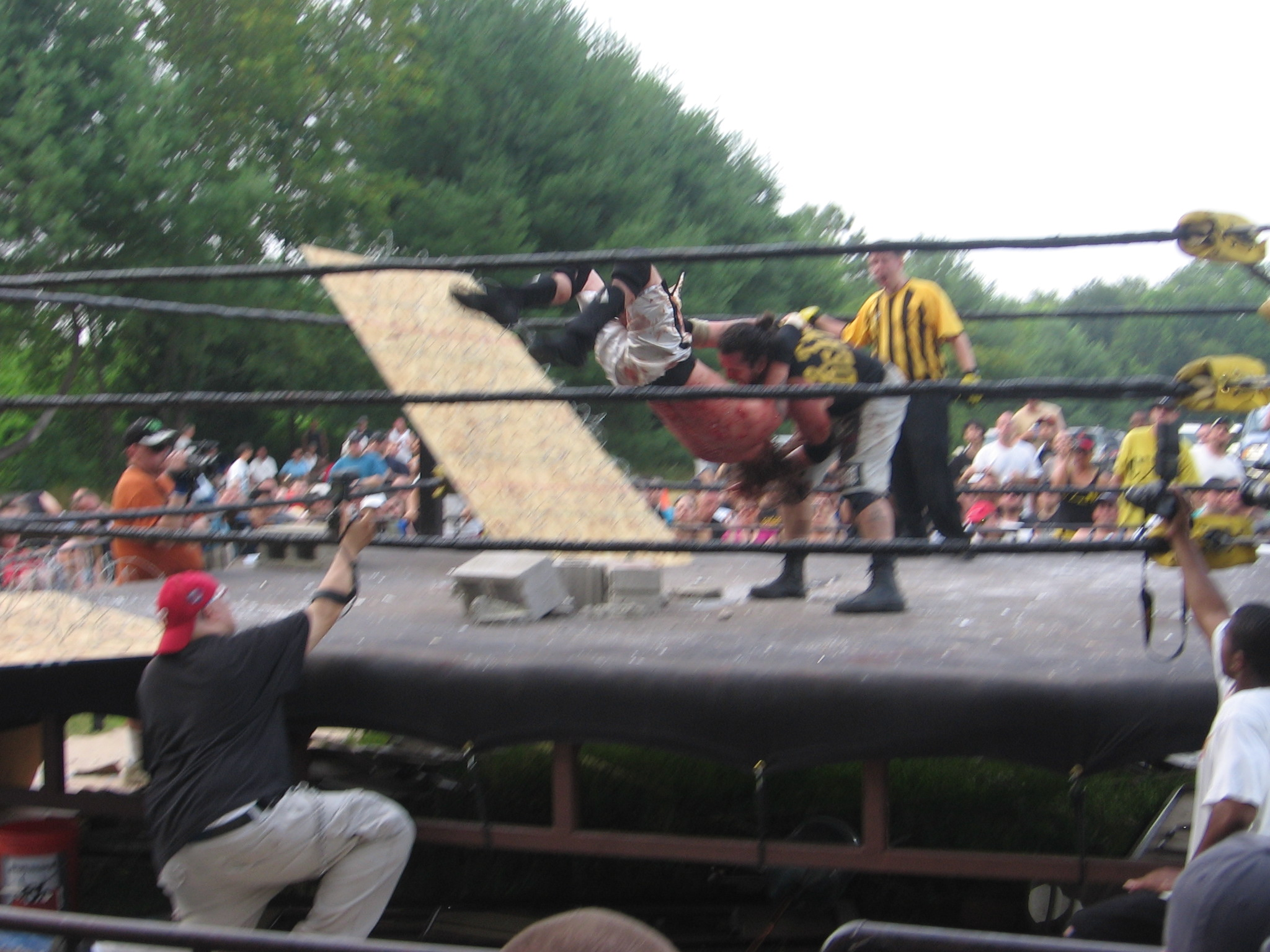
Masada bodyslamming Scotty Vortekz onto cinderblocks.

- Anarchy Championship Wrestling
  - ACW Heavyweight Championship (1 time)
  - ACW Tag Team Championship (1 time) – with Killah Kash
  - ACW World Hardcore Championship (1 time)
  - 9th Annual Lone Star Classic (2014)
- Combat Zone Wrestling
  - CZW Ultraviolent Underground Championship (1 time, final)
  - CZW World Heavyweight Championship (1 time) (Note: The CZW Ultraviolent Underground Championship was unified with the CZW World Heavyweight Championship after Masada won the title, thus becoming vacant, inactive and abandoned.)
  - Tournament of Death X (2011)
  - Tournament of Death XI (2012)
  - Tournament of Death: Europe (2012)
- Extreme Texas Wrestling
  - ETW Heavyweight Championship (1 time)
- Freedoms
  - Pain Limit (2010)
- Game Changer Wrestling
  - Nick Gage Invitational Ultraviolent Tournament (2015)
- Heavy Metal Wrestling/Inspire Pro Wrestling
  - HMW Bexar Knuckles Championship (1 time)
  - HMW Bexar Knuckles Championship Tournament (2019)
  - The Texas Death Match Massacre Tournament (2019)
- Independent Wrestling Association Mid-South
  - IWA Mid-South King of the Deathmatch (2009)
- NWA Wildside
  - NWA Wildside Tag Team Championship (1 time) – with Todd Sexton
- Pro Wrestling Illustrated
  - PWI ranked him #94 of the top 500 wrestlers in the PWI 500 in 2013
- River City Wrestling
  - RCW Heavyweight Championship (1 time)
  - RCW International Championship (1 time)
- Severe Violent Nature
  - SVN Ultraviolent Championship (1 time, current)
- XCW Wrestling
  - XCW Heavyweight Championship (1 time)
  - Battle Box 8 (2007)
- Xtreme Pro Wrestling
  - XPW World Heavyweight Championship (1 time)
- Branded Outlaw Wrestling
  - Branded Outlaw Wrestling Heavyweight Championship (1 time)
