= Deathmatch Hall of Fame =

Professional wrestling hall of fame

- Formation: May 31, 2019 (7 years ago)
- Members: 26 total inductees

The Deathmatch Hall of Fame is a hall of fame that honors professional wrestlers and wrestling personalities who contributed to deathmatch wrestling, founded by Game Changer Wrestling (GCW).

== History ==
In 2019, GCW held the first Deathmatch Hall of Fame inductions on May 31, 2019 at Showboat Atlantic City in Atlantic City, New Jersey, on the weekend of Tournament of Survival 4. The inaugural inductees included Mad Man Pondo who was inducted by Kevin Gill, Matt Tremont who was inducted by Homicide, Danny Havoc, and Nate Hatred who were both inducted by Nick Gage.

In 2021, the Deathmatch Hall of Fame returned after a one-year absence with Nick Mondo being one of the headlining inductees. Supreme was also inducted posthumously into the class of 2021. The Class of 2022 saw the induction of two-time CZW Tournament of Death champion Wifebeater, Toby Klein, Dewey Donovan, and 2010 IWA Mid-South King of the Deathmatch champion J. C. Bailey. On June 1, 2024, WWE Hall of Famer Abdullah the Butcher was inducted into the class of 2024.

== Inductees ==
=== Class of 2019 ===
Image	Ring name (Birth name)	Inducted by
	Danny Havoc (Grant Berkland)	Nick Gage
	Mad Man Pondo (Kevin Canady)	Kevin Gill
	Matt Tremont	Homicide
N/A	Nate Hatred (Nathan J. Kehner)	Nick Gage

=== Class of 2021 ===
Image	Ring name (Birth name)	Inducted by
N/A	Gene	N/A
	Nick Mondo (Matthew Burns)	N/A
	Supreme (Lester Perfors)	N/A

=== Class of 2022 ===
Image	Ring name (Birth name)	Inducted by
N/A	Dewey Donovan	
	J. C. Bailey (Joseph Bailey Jr.)	Mad Man Pondo
N/A	Toby Klein	Brandon Lee
	Wifebeater (Matthew Prince)	Nick Mondo

=== Class of 2023 ===
Image	Ring name (Birth name)	Inducted by
N/A	Brain Damage (Marvin Lambert)	N/A
N/A	Lowlife Louie	
N/A	Mike Bieszck	
	Zandig (John Corson)	Brett Lauderdale and Joey Janela

=== Class of 2024 ===
Image	Ring name (Birth name)	Inducted by
	Abdullah the Butcher (Lawrence Schreve)	
N/A	Gary Walter	
N/A	Markus Crane	

=== Class of 2025 ===
Image	Ring name (Birth name)	Inducted by
	2 Tuff Tony (Anthony Borcherding)	Violent J
	Jeff Cannonball (Jeff Guerriero)	Tony Deppen
N/A	Mean And Hard (Mean Mitch Page and Rollin' Hard)	
N/A	Scrawny Shawny	

=== Class of 2026 ===
Image	Ring name (Birth name)	Inducted by
N/A	Dysfunction (Kevin Krueger)	
	Masashi Takeda	
N/A	Iceman (Isaac Harrop)	
N/A	Megumi Kudo (Megumi Takeyama)	
