= CZW Tournament of Death =

Annual professional wrestling event

The Tournament of Death is an annual professional wrestling tournament organized by Combat Zone Wrestling since 2002, during which a number of wrestlers compete in various deathmatches in what are mostly single-elimination tournaments similar to World Wrestling Entertainment's King of the Ring tournament. These tournaments include the typical hardcore weapons used in deathmatch wrestling such as barbed wire, nails, thumbtacks, fire, tables, ladders, and light tubes, and are known for all their large amounts of blood loss.

Notable entrants in the Tournament of Death have included Jon Moxley, Nick Gage, Eddie Kingston, Sami Callihan, Nick Mondo, Jimmy Havoc, Ian Rotten, Ruckus, Drake Younger and Mickie Knuckles (the only female entrant to date). Many of the cards have also included non-tournament matches featuring top independent wrestlers such as Drew Gulak, Sonjay Dutt, James Ellsworth, Trent Acid, and B-Boy.

== Winners ==
Winner	Date	Location	Tournament of Death	Runner-up
Wifebeater	August 31, 2002	Dover, Delaware	I	Nick Mondo
Nick Mondo	July 26, 2003	Dover, Delaware	II	Ian Rotten
Wifebeater (2)	July 24, 2004	Smyrna, Delaware	III	Necro Butcher
Necro Butcher	July 30, 2005	New Castle, Delaware	IV	Zandig and Nick Gage
Nick Gage	July 29, 2006	Smyrna, Delaware	V	Brain Damage, Drake Younger, and J. C. Bailey
Drake Younger	June 9, 2007	Smyrna, Delaware	VI	Brain Damage
Brain Damage	September 15, 2007	Smyrna, Delaware	Fast Forward	Scotty Vortekz, Danny Havoc, and J.C. Bailey
Danny Havoc	May 17, 2008	Smyrna, Delaware	VII	Nick Gage, Scotty Vortekz, and Drake Younger
Thumbtack Jack	June 6, 2009	Townsend, Delaware	VIII	Thumbtack Jack, Jon Moxley, Sami Callihan, D. J. Hyde, Brain Damage, Dysfunction, xOMGx, Drake Younger, and Scotty Vortekz^{1}
Thumbtack Jack (2)	October 25, 2009	Townsend, Delaware	Rewind	Masada
Scotty Vortekz	June 26, 2010	Townsend, Delaware	IX	J. C. Bailey
Nick Gage (2)	November 11, 2010	Oberhausen, Germany	Tournament of Death vs. Gorefest	Masada
Masada	June 25, 2011	Townsend, Delaware	X	Masashi Takeda
Masada (2)	June 23, 2012	Townsend, Delaware	XI	Drake Younger
Masada (3)	November 4, 2012	Nordrhein-Westfalen, Germany	Europe	D. J. Hyde, Drake Younger, and Matt Tremont
Danny Havoc (2)	June 8, 2013	Townsend, Delaware	12	Scotty Vortekz
Jun Kasai	June 14, 2014	Townsend, Delaware	XIII	Masada
Matt Tremont	June 13, 2015	Townsend, Delaware	14	Conor Claxton
Rickey Shane Page	June 11, 2016	Townsend, Delaware	XV	Matt Tremont
Jimmy Havoc	June 10, 2017	Townsend, Delaware	16	Conor Claxton
Jimmy Lloyd	June 9, 2018	Berlin, New Jersey	17	Rickey Shane Page
Conor Claxton	June 22, 2019	Voorhees, New Jersey	18	Officer Dan O'Hare
Bobby Beverly	October 29, 2022	Townsend, Delaware	19	Mickie Knuckles
Big F'n Joe	October 7, 2023	Townsend, Delaware	XX	Mickie Knuckles, SHLAK, and Bobby Beverly
Mickie Knuckles	September 21, 2024	Townsend, Delaware	21	Judge Joe Dred
SHLAK	September 6, 2025	Townsend, Delaware	23	Judge Joe Dred
Joe Dred	September 5, 2026 - September 6, 2026	Townsend, Delaware	24	Bear Bronson
Jack Harrop	September 27, 2026	Liverpool, England	UK	Joe Dred

=== Most victories ===
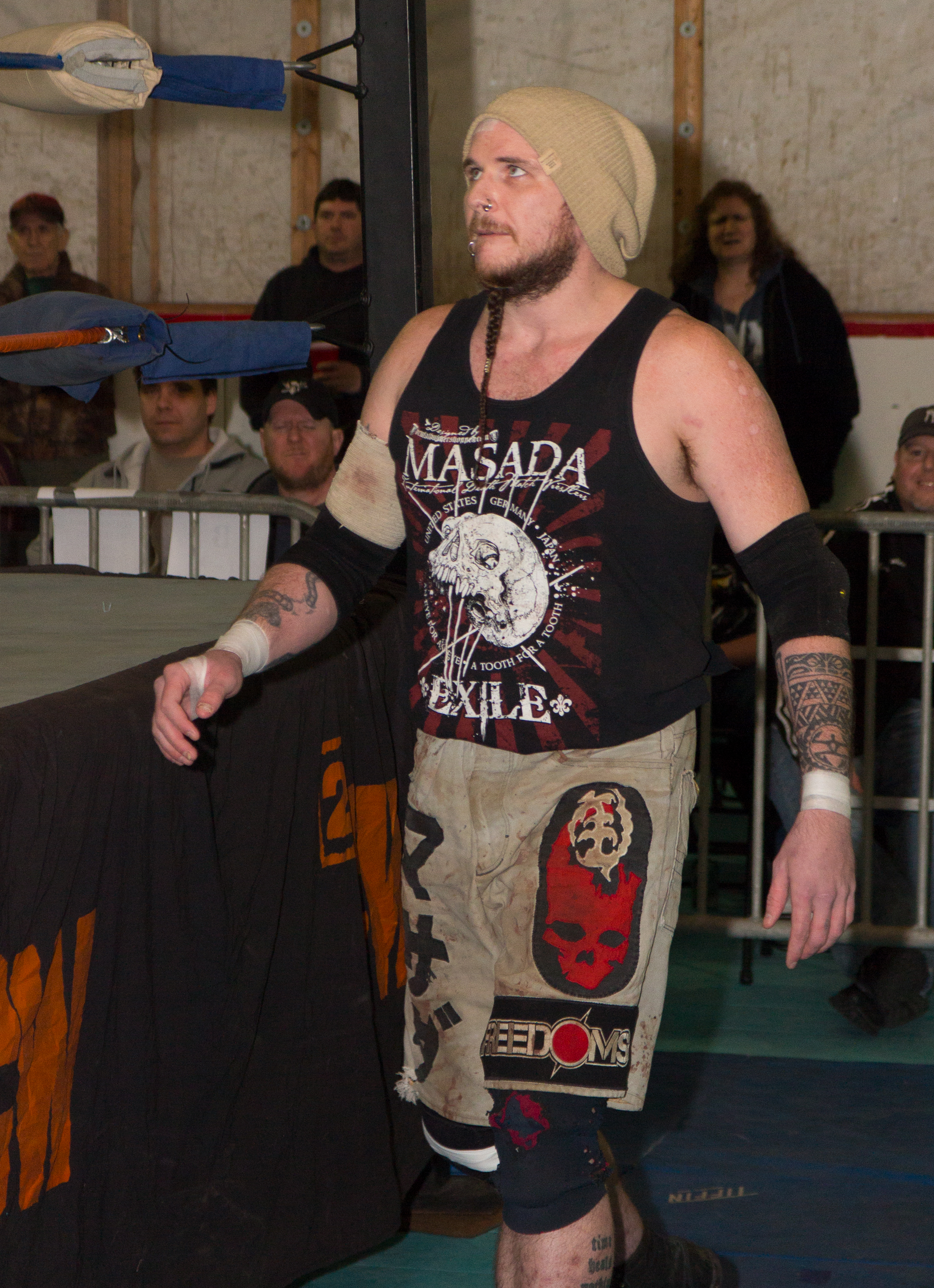
Masada holds the record for having the most Tournament of Death victories at 3.

Wrestler	TOD wins	Year
Masada	3	2011, 2012, 2012
Danny Havoc	2	2008, 2013
Nick Gage	2	2006, 2010
Thumbtack Jack	2	2009, 2009
Wifebeater	2	2002, 2004

^{1}The finals between Thumbtack Jack and Nick Gage was ruled a no-contest due to Gage suffering an injury that required emergency surgery. Zandig won an Ultraviolent Battle Royal. After the match, Zandig awarded the win to Thumbtack Jack.

== Zandig's Ultraviolent Tournament of Death ==
August 31, 2002 saw the first annual CZW Tournament of Death. The event was billed as Zandig's Ultraviolent Tournament of Death due to a storyline of John Zandig losing ownership of CZW to Lobo, thus promoting his own deathmatch tournament. It was held in Dover, Delaware. Non-tournament matches included Green Phantom & Arsenal defeating The Hardcore Ninjaz and a tag scramble match which saw The Backseat Boyz defeat Derek Frasier & Sonjay Dutt, Jon Dahmer & Towel Boy and The New School, as well as a Three Way Dance in which Ruckus defeated Justice Pain and Nick Berk. On winning the tournament, Wifebeater became the CZW Death Match Champion, however, the title was vacated on November 9, 2002, upon his retirement.

Competitors

- John Zandig
- Nate Hatred
- Wifebeater
- Necro Butcher
- The Messiah
- Nick Mondo
- Nick Gage
- Toby Klein
- Adam Flash
- Homeless Jimmy

=== Round one ===
1. Zandig vs. Nate Hatred went to a no contest - Barbed Wire Boards^{†}
2. The Messiah def. Adam Flash
3. Wifebeater def. Necro Butcher - Staple Gun & Mousetraps & Falls Count Anywhere
4. Nick Gage def. Toby Klein - Barbed Wire Boards & Wooden Strips with Nails
5. Nick Mondo def. Homeless Jimmy - Falls Count Anywhere

=== Semi finals ===
1. Wifebeater def. Nick Gage - Panes of Glass Deathmatch
2. Nick Mondo def. The Messiah - Fans Bring The Weapons

=== Final ===
1. Wifebeater def. Nick Mondo - 200 Light Tubes and Barbed Wire Ropes Deathmatch

Note

^{†} - Both men were attacked by Lobo, Rockin Rebel, Z-Barr, Adam Flash, & Danny Rose. Lobo then entered Flash into the tournament and challenged anyone in the locker room. The Messiah returned and defeated Flash with Carlito's Way

== Ultraviolent Tournament of Death II ==
July 26, 2003 saw the second CZW Tournament of Death, again held in Dover, Delaware. Non-tournament matches included Trent Acid pinning Z-Barr, Johnny Kashmere pinning Nick Berk, and a tag match in which B-Boy & Messiah defeated Sonjay Dutt & Ruckus. Although Nick Mondo won the tournament, due to the injuries he sustained he had to vacate his CZW Iron Man Championship afterwards. This event would also be the last he wrestled in.

Competitors

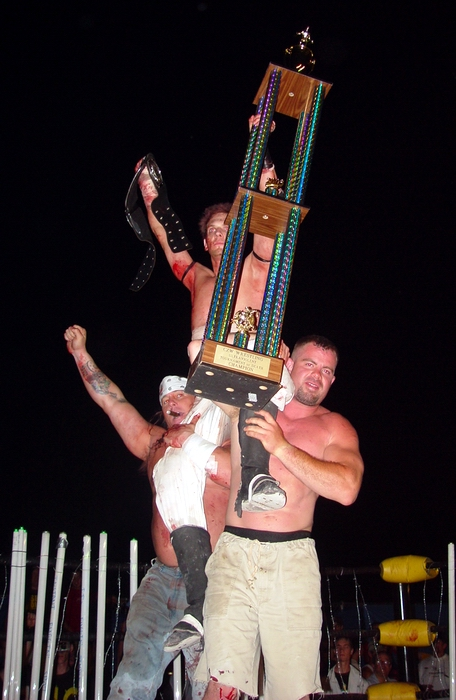
Nick Mondo after winning the TOD2.

- Zandig
- Nick Mondo
- J. C. Bailey
- Nate Webb
- Necro Butcher
- Corporal Robinson
- Ian Rotten
- Nick Gage

=== Round one ===
1. Zandig def. Nate Webb - Panes of Glass Match
2. Nick Mondo def. J. C. Bailey - Light Tubes & Ladders Match
3. Necro Butcher def. Corporal Robinson - 4 Corners of Pain Match
4. Ian Rotten def. Nick Gage - Barbed Wire Boards & Light Tube Table Match

=== Semi finals ===
1. Ian Rotten def. Necro Butcher - Fans Bring The Weapons Match
2. Nick Mondo def. Zandig - 2/3 Light Tube Log Cabins Match

=== Final ===
1. Nick Mondo def. Ian Rotten - Barbed Wire Ropes, 200 Light Tubes Match

== Ultraviolent Tournament of Death III: Banned... My Ass ==
On July 24, 2004, the third CZW Tournament of Death (subtitled Banned... My Ass) was held in Smyrna, Delaware. This year there were no non-tournament matches held, however, the number of entrants rose from eight to twelve (including representatives of Canada's International Wrestling Syndicate).

Competitors

- Arsenal
- Evil Ninja #2
- Nick Gage
- Ruckus^{↑}
- Wifebeater
- Mad Man Pondo
- SeXXXy Eddy
- Ian Knoxx
- Necro Butcher
- The Green Phantom
- J. C. Bailey
- Chri$ Ca$h

^{↑} Ruckus entered as a substitute for John Zandig

=== Round one ===
1. Arsenal def. Evil Ninja #2 - 2/3 Light Tube Log Cabins Match
2. Nick Gage def. Ruckus - Barbed Wire Boards Match
3. Wifebeater def. Mad Man Pondo - Fans Bring the Weapons Match
4. SeXXXy Eddy def. Ian Knoxx - Thumbtacks, Carpet Strips & Carpet Strip Board Match
5. Necro Butcher def. The Green Phantom - Fans Bring the Weapons Match
6. J. C. Bailey def. Chri$ Ca$h - Light Tubes & Ladders Match

=== Semi finals ===
1. SeXXXy Eddy def. Arsenal - Light Tube Ropes & Light Tube Corners Match^{‡}
2. Wifebeater def. J. C. Bailey - Fans Bring the Weapons Match
3. Necro Butcher def. Nick Gage - Panes of Glass Match

=== Final ===
1. Wifebeater def. Necro Butcher - Barbed Wire Ropes, 200 Light Tubes, Fans Bring The Weapons, Light Tube Cage Part, Barbed Wire Cage Part, and Falls Count Anywhere Double Hell Death Match (Tons of all weapons, barbed wire ropes, cage parts covered in light tubes, cage parts covered in barbed wire, and lots more)

^{‡} SeXXXy Eddy was taken to hospital following the match after suffering a wound to the arm, and so could not compete in the final

== Tournament of Death IV: Explicit Content ==
On July 30, 2005, the fourth CZW Tournament of Death took place in New Castle, Delaware. This year's show included a non-tournament Ultraviolent Student Battle Royal, won by WHACKS. As well as featuring Gypsy Joe as special guest referee for the tournament final. After the final, as Necro Butcher had won the finals, he was awarded the CZW Ultraviolent Underground Championship.

Competitors in the Ultraviolent Student Battle Royal

- Scrawny Shawny
- Andy Sumner
- WHACKS
- Danny Havoc
- Blood
- Ravage
- Heretic
- Rick Feinburg
- Hellaware Assassin
- Shawn Bishop
- D. J. Hyde

Competitors

- J. C. Bailey
- SeXXXy Eddy
- Toby Klein
- Mad Man Pondo
- Nick Gage
- Nate Webb
- Zandig
- Robbie Mireno & Eddie Kingston^{↑}
- Beef Wellington
- Brain Damage
- Necro Butcher
- Ian Rotten

^{↑} Robbie Mireno and Eddie Kingston entered as one, losing to Zandig in a first round handicap match Joker came out and help Zandig

=== Round one ===
1. J. C. Bailey def. SeXXXy Eddy - Barbed Wire Madness Match
2. Toby Klein def. Mad Man Pondo - Light Tube Ropes & Light Tube Corners Match
3. Brain Damage def. Beef Wellighton - 2/3 Ultraviolent Tables Match
4. Necro Butcher def. Ian Rotten - Home Run Derby Deathmatch
5. Nick Gage def. Nate Webb - Ladders And Light Tubes Match
6. Zandig def. Robbie Mireno and Eddie Kingston - Fans Bring The Weapons Match*

=== Semi finals ===
1. Necro Butcher def. Brain Damage - Fans Bring The Weapons Match
2. Zandig def. Toby Klein - 2 Out of 3 Light Tube Log Cabins Match
3. Nick Gage def. J. C. Bailey - Panes Of Glass Match

=== Final ===
1. Necro Butcher def. Zandig and Nick Gage - Ultraviolent Boxes, Barbed Wire Canvas, Light Tubes, Squared Circle Of Fear, & Whatever The Fuck Is Left Elimination Death Match

== Tournament of Death V ==
The fifth CZW Tournament of Death was held in Smyrna, Delaware on July 29, 2006. The format changed slightly for this show, with the first round matches being three-way elimination matches, the second round matches being 4-way double elimination matches, and the final being a single elimination 4-way match. Non-tournament matches included The Blackout (Ruckus & Robbie Mireno) defeating Drew Gulak & Jimmy Dream, and Kylie defeating former ECW star Chad Austin.

Competitors

- Brandon Prophet
- Nick Gage
- Andy Sumner
- J. C. Bailey
- Drake Younger
- Lobo
- Brain Damage
- Necro Butcher
- Toby Klein
- Danny Havoc
- D. J. Hyde
- Zandig

=== Round one ===
1. Brandon Prophet and Nick Gage elim. Andy Sumner - Barbed Wire Ropes & Light Tubes Match
2. J. C. Bailey and Drake Younger elim. Lobo - Light Tubes & Barbed Wire Spider Webs Match
3. Brain Damage and Necro Butcher elim. Toby Klein - Barbed Wire Ropes, Fans Bring The Weapons Match
4. Danny Havoc and D. J. Hyde elim. John Zandig - Barbed Wire Ropes, Barbed Wire Boards & Panes Of Glass Match

=== Semi finals ===
1. Nick Gage and Brain Damage elim. Brandon Prophet and Necro Butcher - Fans Bring The Weapons Match
2. Drake Younger and J. C. Bailey elim. D. J. Hyde and Danny Havoc - Light Tubes, Ladders & Lemons Match

=== Final ===
1. Nick Gage def. Brain Damage, Drake Younger and J. C. Bailey - Light Tubes, Panes of Glass & Fans Bring The Weapons Match

== Tournament of Death VI ==
Tournament of Death VI returned to Smyrna, Delaware on June 9, 2007. This was a 12-man tournament, with non-tournament matches including Team AnDrew (Andy Sumner & Drew Gulak) defeating the then CZW World Tag Team Champions The Blackout (Ruckus & Sabian) in a non-title match.

Competitors

- Danny Havoc
- Scotty Vortekz
- Insane Lane
- Freakshow
- D. J. Hyde
- Mad Man Pondo
- Brain Damage
- Toby Klein
- Drake Younger
- Diehard Dustin Lee
- Necro Butcher
- Zandig

=== Round one ===
1. Danny Havoc def. Scotty Vortekz - Light Tubes, Ladders, & Light Tube Log Cabin Match
2. Insane Lane def. Freakshow - Home Run Derby Match
3. D. J. Hyde (with Maven Bentley) def. Mad Man Pondo - Shattered Dreams Match
4. Brain Damage (with Maven Bentley) def. Toby Klein (with Billy Graham) - Barbed Wire Boards, Fans Bring the Weapons Match
5. Drake Younger def. Diehard Dustin Lee - Light Tubes & Light Tube Table Match
6. Necro Butcher def. John Zandig† - No Rope Barbed Wire, Barbed Wire Boards, Panes of Glass & Barbed Wire Spider Web Match

† Necro Butcher was originally scheduled to face Mitch Ryder, but he could not make it due to travel issues

=== Semi finals ===
1. Drake Younger def. Danny Havoc and D. J. Hyde - 3-Way Weedwhackers Elimination Match
2. Brain Damage def. Insane Lane and Necro Butcher - Fans Bring the Weapons Match

=== Final ===
1. Drake Younger def. Brain Damage - Divide & Conquer 200 Light Tubes and Lumberjacks Deathmatch

== Tournament of Death: Fast Forward ==
Tournament of Death: Fast Forward took place on September 15, 2007. It was a mini-TOD for the vacant Ultraviolent Underground title.

Competitors

- Brain Damage
- Hellaware Assassin
- Scotty Vortekz
- Danny Demanto
- Danny Havoc
- Drake Younger
- Diehard Dustin Lee
- J. C. Bailey

=== First round ===
1. Brain Damage def. Hellaware Assassin in a Weapons Match
2. Scotty Vortekz def. Danny Demanto in a 4 Corners of Pain Match
3. Danny Havoc def. Diehard Dustin Lee in a Barbed Wire Tables, Lightubes, and Staple Gun Match
4. J. C. Bailey def. Drake Younger in a Pane of Glass and Lightubes Match

=== Final round ===
1. Brain Damage def. Scotty Vortez, Danny Havoc, and J. C. Bailey in an Ultraviolent Underground Title Match 4 Way Elimination - Fans Brings The Weapons, Thumbtacks Fire and Ultraviolent Staple Gun Death Match

== Tournament of Death VII ==
Tournament of Death VII took place on for the third year in a row in Smyrna, Delaware, on May 17, 2008, and marked the first time a female competitor had entered the tournament. It included a non-tournament match between The Blackout (Ruckus & Sabian) and Joe Gacy & Alex Colon. Attendance was reported as 527.

Competitors

- Pinkie Sanchez
- Danny Demanto
- Scotty Vortekz
- Mickie Knuckles
- WHACKS
- Dustin Lee
- D. J. Hyde
- Andy Sumner
- Nick Gage
- Drake Younger
- Drew Blood
- Greg Excellent
- Ryan McBride
- Danny Havoc
- Necro Butcher

=== Round one ===
1. Pinkie Sanchez def. Danny Demanto - Ladder & Light Tubes Match
2. Scotty Vortekz def. Mickie Knuckles - Light Tubes Match
3. WHACKS def. Dustin Lee - Barbed Wire Boards & Light Tubes Match
4. D. J. Hyde def. Andy Sumner - Falls Count Anywhere Match
5. Nick Gage vs. Drake Younger led to a no-contest after interference from Drew Blood and Devon Moore, leading to A VERY Bloody Match
6. Nick Gage & Drake Younger def. Drew Blood & Devon Moore - Panes of Glass Match
7. Greg Excellent def. Ryan McBride - Barbed Wire Madness Match
8. Danny Havoc def. Ram - Light Tube Bundles Match^{↑}

^{↑}Ram was Mickey Rourke's stunt double during the taping of "The Wrestler" movie and served as Necro Butcher's stunt double in this match

=== Semi finals ===
1. Scotty Vortekz and Drake Younger def. D. J. Hyde and WHACKS - Fish Hook Death Match
2. Nick Gage and Danny Havoc def. Greg Excellent and Pinkie Sanchez - Fans Bring The Weapons Match

=== Final ===
1. Danny Havoc def. Nick Gage, Scotty Vortekz and Drake Younger - No Rope Barbed Wire, Barbed Wire Board, Barbed Wire Table, Panes of Glass, 200 Light Tubes Match

== Tournament of Death VIII ==
Tournament of Death VIII took place on June 6, 2009, at the Ultraviolent Underground in Townsend, Delaware. Attendance was around 800.

Competitors

- Nick Gage
- Deranged
- Brain Damage
- Jon Moxley
- D. J. Hyde
- Toby Klein
- Dysfunction
- WHACKS
- Danny Havoc
- Thumbtack Jack
- xOMGx
- Scotty Vortekz
- Drake Younger

=== First round ===
1. Nick Gage def. Deranged - Fire Death Match (No Ropes Flaming Barbed Wire)
2. Jon Moxley def. Brain Damage - Dining Room Deathmatch (Tables, Chairs, Silverware, and more)
3. WHACKS def. Toby Klein - Barbed Wire Boards & Light Tube Bundles Match
4. Danny Havoc def. Dysfunction - Panes of Glass Death Match (Barbed Wire Glass, Light Tube Glass & Panes of Glass)
5. Scotty Vortekz def. xOMGx and Drake Younger - Thumbtack Kickpads Match
6. Thumbtack Jack def. D. J. Hyde - Jack In The Box Death Match (Panes of Glass, Cinder Blocks, Light Tubes, Syringes, & more)

=== Semi-final round ===
1. Nick Gage def. Jon Moxley and Scotty Vortekz - Fans Bring The Weapons Match
2. Thumbtack Jack def. WHACKS and Danny Havoc - Fans Bring The Weapons Match

=== Final round ===
1. Thumbtack Jack vs. Nick Gage went to a no contest. Gage was seriously cut under his armpit after being thrown through lighttubes which were propped between the ropes and had to be air lifted out for emergency surgery - "200 Light Tubes, Panes of Glass, and All the Other Shit in the Back We Could Find" deathmatch
2. Zandig def. Thumbtack Jack, Jon Moxley, Sami Callihan, D. J. Hyde, Brain Damage, Dysfunction, xOMGx, Drake Younger, and Scotty Vortekz - Ultraviolent Battle Royal. After the match, Zandig awarded the win to Thumbtack Jack.

=== TOD Championship Defense @ BOTB 2009 ===
1. D. J. Hyde def. Thumbtack Jack, Jon Moxley, and Danny Havoc

== Tournament of Death: Rewind ==
Tournament of Death: Rewind took place on October 25, 2009, after being postponed due to weather issues from the day before, at the Ultraviolent Underground in Townsend, Delaware. The Ultraviolent Underground title was on the line throughout the tournament. Attendance was about 150.

Competitors

- Nick Gage
- Thumbtack Jack
- John Zandig
- Masada
- Brain Damage
- Jon Moxley
- Sami Callihan
- Danny Havoc

=== First round ===
1. Sami Callihan def. Danny Havoc in a Caribbean Pits of Death Deathmatch (Caribbean Spider Web Style: Carpet Strips/Broken Glass, Barbed Wire/Broken Glass & Barbed Wire Light Tube Platform) to become the new Ultraviolent Underground champion
2. Thumbtack Jack def. "Streetdog" Jon Moxley in a Four Corners of Fun Dog Collar Death Match (Lego Bricks, Staple Gun, Mouse Trap Board & Cinder Blocks)
3. Masada def. Brain Damage in a New Age Texas Death Match
4. Nick Gage def. Zandig in a Panes of Glass Match

=== Second round ===
1. Thumbtack Jack def. Sami Callihan in a Transylvania Death Match (Light Tube Casket) to become the new Ultraviolent Underground champion
2. Masada def. Nick Gage in a Home Run Derby Death Match

=== Finals ===
1. Thumbtack Jack def. Masada In A House Of Pain Deathmatch (Barbed Wire Ropes, Light Tube Ropes, Cinder Blocks, Barbed Wire Platform & Home Run Derby Weapons)

== Tournament of Death IX ==
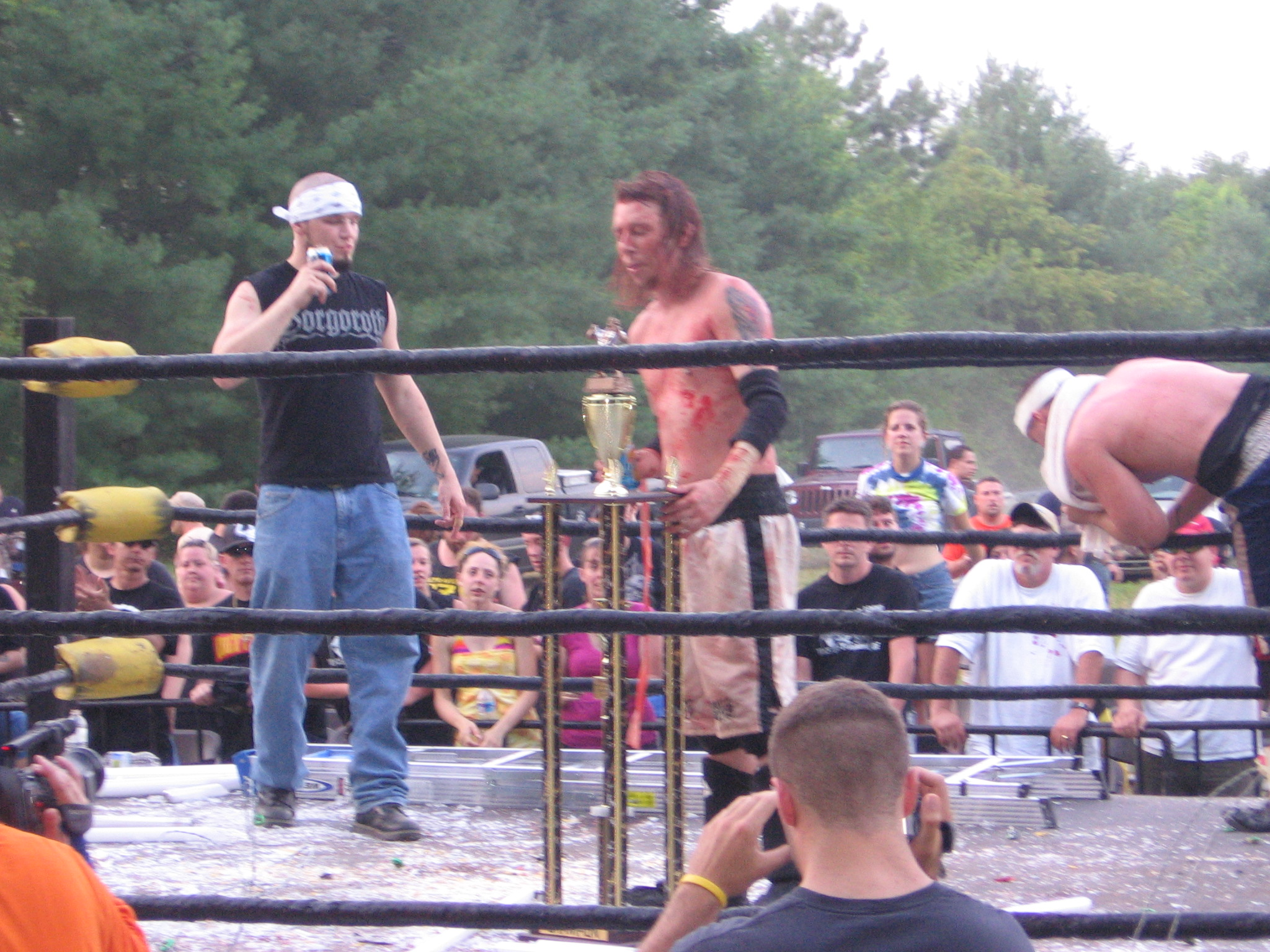
Scotty Vortekz after winning the Tournament of Death 9

Tournament of Death 9 was held on June 26, 2010, at the Ultraviolent Underground in Townsend, Delaware. Non Tournament matches were Brain Damage defeated Drake Younger in a "sit and hit" Tai Pei deathmatch and Sami Callihan and Joe Gacy defeated Greg Excellent and D. J. Hyde in an Ultraviolent Tag Team Fans Bring the Weapons Falls Count Anywhere Deathmatch. Attendance was around 1,000.

Competitors

- Masada
- Devon Moore
- Abdullah Kobayashi
- J. C. Bailey
- Danny Havoc
- Dysfunction
- Nick Gage

=== Round one ===
1. J. C. Bailey def. Danny Havoc in a Havoc's Happyland Death Match (Light Tube Bundles & Structures)†
2. Abdullah Kobayashi def. Nick Gage in a Weapons of Mass Destruction Death Match (Kenzans and more)‡
3. Scotty Vortekz def. Dysfunction in a Thumbtack Kickpads and Panes of Glass Death Match
4. Masada def. Devon Moore in a Fans Bring the Weapons Death Match

=== Round two ===
1. J. C. Bailey def. Abdullah Kobayashi in a 3 out of 5 Barbed wire board and Light Tube Log Cabin Death Match
2. Scotty Vortekz def. Masada in a Boards of Death Deathmatch (Barbed Wire Boards Death Match with Light Tubes, Ladders, and many more)

=== Finals ===
1. Scotty Vortekz def. J. C. Bailey in a Tables, Ladders, Light Tubes, and Anything Else Still Left in the Back Death Match

Promotional Poster of TOD vs. GoreFest

== Tournament of Death vs. Gorefest ==
Tournament of Death vs. Gorefest was held on November 7, 2010, in Oberhausen, Germany. Non Tournament matches were Jon Moxley defeated Devon Moore in a match for the CZW World Heavyweight Title, Big van Walter defeated 2-Face in a match for the wXw World Heavyweight Title, Adam Cole, Drew Gulak, Karsten Beck & Blk Jeez defeat Zack Sabre Jr., Greg Excellent, Bernd Föhr & Rich Swann in an 8-man tag inter-promotional showcase, and Sami Callihan defeated Carnage. Attendance was around 356.

Competitors

- Masada
- Adam Polak
- Drake Younger
- D. J. Hyde
- Danny Havoc
- Jon Ryan
- Nick Gage
- Jimmy Havoc

=== Round one ===
1. Jon Ryan def. Danny Havoc in a Thumbtack Stuff Death match
2. Drake Younger def. D. J. Hyde in a Cinderblocks & Barbed Wire board Death match
3. Masada def. Jimmy Havoc in a Ultraviolent Tables Death match
4. Nick Gage† def. Adam Polak in a Polish Punishment Death Match

=== Round two ===
1. Masada def. Drake Younger in a 2/3 log Cabins Death match
2. Nick Gage‡ def. Jon Ryan in an Unlucky 13 Death match

=== Round three ===
1. Nick Gage± def. Masada in a No Ropes Barbed Wire Death match
†Nick Gage received the Ultraviolent Underground Title after defeating Adam Polak

‡Nick Gage successfully defended the Ultraviolent Underground title against Jon Ryan

±Nick Gage successfully defended the Ultraviolent Underground title against Masada

== Tournament of Death X ==
Tournament of Death X took place on June 25, 2011, at the Ultraviolent Underground in Townsend, Delaware. Non tournament action saw Devon Moore and Little Mondo lose to Philly's Most Wanted, and D. J. Hyde vs. Greg Excellent vs. Sami Callihan became Sami Callihan def. Greg Excellent the loser became DJ's slave.

Competitors

- Masashi Takeda
- Jaki Numazawa
- Masada
- Dysfunction
- Necro Butcher
- "Bulldozer" Matt Tremont
- Danny Havoc
- Scotty Vortekz

=== Round 1 ===
1. Fans Bring the Weapons: Masada def. Dysfunction (10:10)
2. Get Hit... With Shit Match (Water Jug Bats & Anything You Can Swing at Your Opponent): "Bulldozer" Matt Tremont def. Necro Butcher (15:33)
3. Light Tube Celebration (Light Tube Bundles & Pits of Christmas Bulbs): Jaki Numazawa def. Danny Havoc (09:30)
4. Barbed Wire Boards, Thumbtack Kickpads and Taipei Glass Death Match: Masashi Takeda def. Scotty Vortekz (09:20)

=== Round 2 ===
1. Kenzans, Whips and "Anything Else Whatever the Fuck We Can Find in the Back" Match: Masada def. "Bulldozer" Matt Tremont (14:49)
2. Barbed Wire Boards, Light Tubes, and Thumbtacks Match: Masashi Takeda def. Jaki Numazawa (07:58)

=== Non-tournament matches ===
1. Sami Callihan def. Greg Excellent (04:23)
2. Philly's Most Wanted (Joker & BLK Jeez) def. Devon Moore & Rory Mondo (13:40)

=== Final round ===
1. Barbed Wire Ropes, Light Tubes and Panes of Glass Match: Masada def. Masashi Takeda (14:00)

== Tournament of Death XI ==
The tournament was held June 23, 2012 in Townsend, DE.

Competitors

- Abdullah Kobayashi
- Matt Tremont
- Rory "Little" Mondo
- Devon Moore
- Drake Younger
- Lucky tHURTeen
- Danny Havoc
- "Mr. Showtime" Scot Summers
- Masada

=== First round ===
1. Drunken Scaffold Match: Danny Havoc def. Devon Moore and Lucky tHURTeen
2. Ultraviolent Ladders and Light Tubes Match: Drake Younger def. Rory Mondo
3. Panes of Glass Match: MASADA def. Scott Summers
4. Light Tube Bundles and Ultraviolent Bats Match: Abdullah Kobayashi def. Matt Tremont

=== Non-tournament matches ===
1. Fans Bring the Weapons Match: 'Chainsaw' Joe Gacy def. Ryan Slater

=== Second round ===
1. Caribbean Spiderwebs of Death & Light Tubes Match: Drake Younger def. Danny Havoc
2. Big Japan Death Match (Nail Board, Kenzans and more): MASADA def. Abdullah Kobayashi

=== Finals ===
1. Non-Sanctioned Ultraviolent Double Hell Death Match (No Ropes Barbed Wire, Barbed Wire Nets, Light Tubes ): MASADA def. Drake Younger

== Tournament of Death: Europe ==
This tournament was held on November 4, 2012 in Germany in front of an audience of 357. In non-tournament action Jay Skillet def. Karsten Beck taking Match 5 of the Jay Skillet Trial Series, OI4K def. Gridiron, Are$ def. Robert Dreissker, and Jonathan Gresham def. Alex Colon qualifying for the 2013 wXw 16 Carat Gold Tournament.

Competitors

- Matt Tremont
- Jimmy Havoc
- D. J. Hyde
- Mike Schwarz
- Masada
- Greg Excellent
- Toby Blunt
- Drake Younger

=== Round 1 ===
1. Light Tube Hell Death Match: Drake Younger def. Jimmy Havoc
2. Ruhrpott Death Match: Matt Tremont def. Mike Schwarz
3. Tables, Ladders & Chairs Match: D. J. Hyde def. Toby Blunt
4. Fans Bring the Weapons Match: Masada def. Greg Excellent

=== Finals ===
No Ropes Barbed Wire, 200 Light Tubes Elimination Death Match: Masada def. D. J. Hyde, Drake Younger and Matt Tremont.

== Tournament of Death 12 ==
This tournament was held on June 8, 2013 in Townsend, DE @ the Ultraviolent Underground. In non-tournament action, Drake Younger defeated Devon Moore in a Scaffold Match, Drew Gulak vs. Chris Dickinson went to a no contest as both men attacked Masada, and Sami Callihan vs. Greg Excellent ended with D. J. Hyde getting a watermelon smashed over his head and was Callihan's last match in CZW.

Competitors:

- Joe Gacy
- Takumi Tsukamoto
- Ron Mathis
- Danny Havoc
- D. J. Hyde
- Rory Mondo
- Scotty Vortekz

=== Round 1 ===
1. Fans Bring the Weapons Dog Collar Match: Ron Mathis def. Joe Gacy
2. Mummified in Barbed Wire Match: Danny Havoc def. Rory Mondo
3. Ultraviolent Ladders Match: Scotty Vortekz def. Lucky tHURTeen
4. International Panes of Glass: Takumi Tsukamoto def. D. J. Hyde

=== Round 2 ===
1. Fans Bring the Weapons Match: Scotty Vortekz def. Ron Mathis
2. Light Tube Madness: Danny Havoc def. Takumi Tsukamoto

=== Round 3 ===
1. 444 Light Tube Match: Danny Havoc def. Scotty Vortekz

== Tournament of Death XIII ==
This event was held on June 14, 2014, and was prmoted as being a "BJW vs. CZW" show.

Competitors:

- Jun Kasai
- Danny Havoc
- Aero Boy
- MASADA
- Jaki Numazawa
- Matt Tremont
- Masashi Takeda
- Lucky 13

=== Round 1 ===
1. Fans Bring the Dildos Death Match (Dildo Ladder): Lucky 13 def. Jaki Numazawa
2. Barbed Wire Madness Death Match: MASADA def. Aero Boy
3. Ultraviolent Pits of Hell Death Match: Danny Havoc def. Masashi Takeda
4. Light Tube Bundles Death Match: Jun Kasai def. Matt Tremont

=== Round 2 ===
1. Panes of Glass Death Match: MASADA def. Lucky 13
2. Light Tubes, Gusset Plates and Razorboard Death Match: Jun Kasai def. Danny Havoc

=== Finals ===
1. No Ropes Barbed Wire, Light Tube Bundles & Scaffold Death Match: Jun Kasai def. MASADA

== Tournament of Death 14 ==
The 14th annual Tournament of Death took place on June 13, 2015, at the Ultraviolent Underground. Non tournament matches had Dave Crist def. Devon Moore in an Scaffold Match and Lucky tHURTeen def. Eric Ryan in a LOL (Ladders, Orange Sacks and Legos) Match.

Announced Competitors:

- Josh Crane
- Matt Tremont
- Conor Claxton
- D. J. Hyde
- Nick Gage
- Rickey Shane Page
- Ron Mathis
- Danny Havoc
- Jake Crist

=== Round one ===
1. Fans Bring The Weapons Match: Conor Claxton def. D. J. Hyde & Nick Gage
2. Pits & Strips Match: Matt Tremont def. Josh Crane
3. Barbed Wire Boards Match: Jake Crist def. Ron Mathis
4. Light Tube Bundles & Ultraviolent Boards Match: Danny Havoc def. Rickey Shane Page

=== Round two ===
1. Carsenogenic Carnage: Matt Tremont def. Danny Havoc
2. Panes of Glass: Conor Claxton def. Jake Crist

=== Finals ===
1. No Ropes Barbed Wire, Barbed Wire Death Webs & Panes of Glass Match: Matt Tremont def. Conor Claxton

== Tournament of Death XV ==
The 15th annual Tournament of Death took place on June 11, 2016, at the Ultraviolent Underground. Eat The Turnbuckle, the band of Dojo War's wrestler SHLAK, played songs during Intermission of the event. This Tournament of Death was featured in the Vice documentary Bloodlust: Tournament of Death.

Announced Competitors:

- Rickey Shane Page
- Alex Colon
- Danny Havoc
- Tim Donst
- Conor Claxton
- Masada
- Matt Tremont
- Jeff Cannonball

=== Non-tournament matches ===
1. Rockstar Death Match: Aaron Williams def. Ron Mathis
2. Devon Moore Invitational Scaffold Match: Dale Patricks Vs. Devon Moore - No Contest
3. Tag Team Tornado Scaffold Match: Nation Of Intoxication (Devon Moore & Lucky 13) def. Dale Patricks and G-Raver
4. Panes Of Glass Match: Josh Crane def. D. J. Hyde

=== Round one ===
1. Fans Bring the Weapons/Falls Count Anywhere Match Match: Rickey Shane Page def. Tim Donst
2. Barbed Wire Madness Match: Conor Claxton def. Masada
3. Lightubes Bundles Match: Alex Colon def. Danny Havoc
4. Home Run Derby Match: Matt Tremont def. Jeff Cannonball

=== Round two ===
1. Barefoot Rites of Passage Match: Rickey Shane Page def. Conor Claxton
2. Sharp Shit Death Match: Matt Tremont def. Alex Colon

=== Finals ===
1. Ring of Fire and Wire Deathmatch: Rickey Shane Page def. Matt Tremont

== Tournament of Death 16 ==
The 16th annual Tournament of Death took place on June 10, 2017. This tournament marked the debut Tournament of Death for John Wayne Murdoch, Shlak, G-Raver and Clint Margera. This is also the first mainstream Tournament of Death Jimmy Havoc competed in, having wrestled in ToD Europe as a member of Westside Xtreme Wrestling.

- Shlak
- Jeff Cannonball
- John Wayne Murdoch
- Masada
- Conor Claxton
- G-Raver
- Jimmy Havoc
- Rickey Shane Page
- Clint Margera

=== Non-tournament matches ===
1. Four Corners Of Pain: Dan O'Hare def. George Gatton and Jimmy Lloyd and Kit Osbourne
2. Fans Bring The Weapons Match: Matt Tremont def. Mad Man Pondo
3. Scaffold Match: Danny Havoc and Alex Colon def. Notorious Inc (Devon Moore/Kit Osbourne and Drew Blood)

=== First round ===
1. Pain in the Glass Match: Jimmy Havoc def. John Wayne Murdoch and Rickey Shane Page
2. Lightubes and Cinder Blocks Death Match: Jeff Cannonball def. G-Raver
3. Doorway To Hell Death Match: Masada def. Shlak
4. Barbed Wire Craziness Death Match: Conor Claxton def. Clint Margera

=== Round two ===
1. Summertime Fun Death Match: Conor Claxton def. Jeff Cannonball
2. Light Tubes Treachery Match: Jimmy Havoc def. Masada

=== Finals ===
1. No Ropes, No Canvas, Barbed Wire & Light Tube Deathmatch Match: Jimmy Havoc def. Conor Claxton

== Tournament of Death 17 ==
The 17th annual Tournament of Death took place on June 9, 2018.

- Rickey Shane Page
- Drew Parker
- Brandon Kirk
- Casanova Valentine
- Mance Warner
- Mr. Claxton
- Dan O'Hare
- Dale Patricks
- Stockade
- Josh Crane
- Jimmy Lloyd
- Kit Osbourne
- SHLAK

=== Non-tournament match ===
1. Fans Bring The Weapons Match: Matt Tremont def. Jeff Cannonball and Toby Klein

=== First round ===
1. Blocks, Bats and Bundles Elimination Death Match: Jimmy Lloyd def. Casanova Valentine, SHLAK, Stockade and G-Raver
2. 4 Corners of Pain Elimination Death Match: Mance Warner def. Dale Patricks and Josh Crane
3. Lotsa Lotsa Light Tubes Death Match: Rickey Shane Page def. Drew Parker
4. 4 Corners of Pain & Barbed Wire Madness Elimination Death Match: Brandon Kirk def. Conor Claxton and Dan O'Hare and Kit Osbourne

=== Round two ===
1. Saw Death Match: Jimmy Lloyd def. Mance Warner
2. Death Match: Rickey Shane Page def. Brandon Kirk

=== Finals ===
1. Barbed Wire No Ropes Lightube Death Match: Jimmy Lloyd def. Rickey Shane Page

== Tournament of Death 18 ==
The 18th annual Tournament of Death took place on June 22, 2019.

- SHLAK
- Dan O'Hare
- Jimmy Chondo Lyon
- Conor Claxton
- Jimmy Lloyd
- Big F'n Joe
- Casanova Valentine
- John Wayne Murdoch

=== Non-tournament matches ===
1. Home Run Derby Death Match: The Rep (Dave McCall and Nate Carter) def. Murder By Kicks (Ken Broadway and Matt Travis)
2. Fans Bring The Weapons Match: Matt Tremont def. Mance Warner

=== First round ===
1. Doors Of Death Match: Dan O'Hare def. SHLAK
2. Summer Funtime Death Match: Conor Claxton def. Jimmy Chondo Lyon
3. Shattered Dreams Panes Of Glass Death Match: Jimmy Lloyd def. John Wayne Murdoch
4. Bundles and Boards Death Match: Casanova Valentine def. Big F'n Joe

=== Round two ===
1. Exploding Bat and Light Tubes Death Match: Conor Claxton def. Jimmy Lloyd
2. Texas Tangled Web Death Match: Dan O'Hare def. Casanova Valentine

=== Finals ===
1. Light Tube Madness Death Match: Conor Claxton def. Dan O'Hare

== Tournament of Death 19 ==
The 19th annual Tournament of Death took place on October 29, 2022 in Townsend, Delaware, USA. There were no non-tournament matches.

- Bobby Beverly
- Otis Cogar
- Big F'n Joe
- Necro Butcher
- Insane Lane
- Brad Cash
- Mickie Knuckles
- Orin Veidt

=== First round ===
1. Barbed Wire Massacre Death Match: Bobby Beverly def. Otis Cogar
2. Panes Of Glass Taipei Death Match: Big F'n Joe def. Necro Butcher
3. Shark Tooth Homerun Derby Death Match: Insane Lane def. Brad Cash
4. Bundles Of Tubes Death Match: Mickie Knuckles def. Orin Veidt

=== Round two ===
1. Death Match: Bobby Beverly def. Big F'n Joe
2. Death Match: Mickie Knuckles def. Insane Lane

=== Finals ===
1. Death Match: Bobby Beverly def. Mickie Knuckles

== Tournament of Death XX ==
The 20th annual Tournament of Death took place on October 7, 2023 in Townsend, Delaware, USA. There were no non-tournament matches.

- Bobby Beverly
- Otis Cogar
- Big F'n Joe
- SHLAK
- Eric Dillenger
- Judge Joe Dred
- Mickie Knuckles
- Eric Ryan

=== First round ===
1. Death Match: Bobby Beverly def. Eric Dillenger
2. Swing for the Fences Death Match: Mickie Knuckles def. Otis Cogar
3. Brain Damage CTE Death Match: SHLAK def. Eric Ryan
4. Pits of Hell Death Match: Big F'n Joe def. Judge Joe Dred

=== Finals ===
1. 4-Way Death Match: Big F'n Joe def. Bobby Beverly, SHLAK, and Mickie Knuckles

== Tournament of Death 21 ==
The 21st annual Tournament of Death took place on September 21, 2024 in Townsend, Delaware, USA. There were no non-tournament matches.

- Madman Pondo
- Joel Bateman
- Big F'n Joe
- Tarzan Duran
- Danny Darko
- Judge Joe Dred
- Mickie Knuckles
- JJ Allin

=== First round ===
1. Death Match: Madman Pondo def. Tarzan Duran
2. Raining Blood Death Match: Judge Joe Dred def. Joel Bateman
3. Death By Skinny Tubes Match: Big F'n Joe def. Danny Darko
4. Road Rage Death Match: Mickie Knuckles def. JJ Allin

=== Semifinals ===
1. Death Match: Judge Joe Dred def. Madman Pondo
2. Death Match: Mickie Knuckles def. Big F'n Joe

=== Finals ===
1. Death Match: Mickie Knuckles def. Judge Joe Dred

== Tournament of Death 22 ==
The 22nd annual Tournament of Death took place on September 6, 2025 in Townsend, Delaware, USA.

- SHLAK
- Rickey Shane Page
- Judge Joe Dred
- Nick Gage
- Tim Strange
- Mickie Knuckles
- Eric Ryan
- Dimitri Alexandrov
- JJ Allin
- Drake Younger
- AKIRA
- Hoodfoot

=== Non-tournament match ===
1. Tarp Of Death Invitational: CC Boost def. Alex Stretch, Anthraxx, Baby Shark, Bootleg Dave, Borracho, Brandon Watts, Brew Vallon, Buddy Badcock, Deklan Grant, Drew Chaos, Gabby Gilbert, J. B. Anderson, Jake Dvorak, Jake Gray, Jess Moss, Jesse Daniels, Jimmy Controversy, Lil Skittle, Louie Jr., Mikey Anarchy, Nicco Grey

=== First round ===
1. Four Corners Of Pain: Judge Joe Dred def. Nick Gage
2. Tables Deathmatch: Akira def. Hoodfoot
3. Barbed Wire Madness: Drake Younger def. Dimitri Alexandrov
4. Panes Of Glass: Mickie Knuckles def. Rickey Shane Page
5. Gusset Plate Ropes & Cinderblocks: SHLAK def. Tim Strange
6. Falls Count Anywhere Terracotta Deathmatch: Eric Ryan def. JJ Allin

=== Semi-Final ===
1. Three-way Deathmatch: Judge Joe Dred def. Akira, Drake Younger
2. Three-way 300 Light Tubes Tokyo Tower Deathmatch: SHLAK def. Eric Ryan, Mickie Knuckles

=== Final ===
1. Circle Of Hell Deathmarch: SHLAK def. Judge Joe Dred

== Tournament of Death 23 ==
The 23rd annual Tournament of Death took place from September 5 to September 6, 2026 in Townsend, Delaware, USA. This is also the first time the event was held between two days.

- Dimitri Alexandrov
- Nathan Mowery
- Eric Dillinger
- Eric Ryan
- Jamesen Shook
- Judge Joe Dred
- Tim Strange
- SLADE
- Alex Colon
- Bear Bronson
- Toby Klein
- Nino Extremo

=== Non-tournament match ===
1. Ultraviolent Mexican Junkyard Match: SHLAK (c) def. Aeroboy for the CZW Ultraviolent Championship
2. Exploding Barbed Wire Deathmatch: AKIRA def. Eran Ashe (c) for the CZW World Heavyweight Championship
3. 8-person tag team match: Alex Colon & Lucky 13 & SHLAK & Toby Klein def. AKIRA & Anthraxx & Dimitri Alexandrov & Nino Extremo
4. Singles match: Nixon Newell def. Nat Castle
5. Tag Team match: Nick Gage & Rickey Shane Page def. Nathan Mowery & Jameson Shook
6. Ladder Match: Sicko The Clown def. Jimmy Lloyd
7. Tarp Of Death Invitational: Jake Gray def. Alex Stretch, Anthraxx, Chris White, Crazy Dave, Jimmy Controversy, Marc Angel, Marty 2 Fly, Nicco Grey

=== First round ===
1. Hasta La Verte Casket Match: Joe Dred def. Nino Extremo
2. Terracotta Taipei, Barbed Wire Jacks Deathmatch: Eric Ryan def. Toby Klein
3. Fans Brings The Weapons: SLADE def. Nathan Mowery
4. Gusset Plate: Tim Strange def. Dimitri Alexandrov
5. Electrified Light Tubes and Tokyo Towers: Eric Dillinger def. Jamesen Shook
6. Panes Of Glass: Bear Bronson def. Alex Colon

=== Semi-Final ===
1. Light Tube Log Cabin And Loose Tubes Three Way Deathmatch: Joe Dred def. Slade, Tim Strange
2. Three Way Panes Of Glass: Bear Bronson def. Eric Dillinger, Eric Ryan

=== Final ===
1. Exploding Time Bomb Countdown To Hell Deathmatch: Joe Dred def. Bear Bronson

== Tournament of Death UK ==
The Tournament of Death UK took place on September 27, 2026 in Liverpool, Merseyside, United Kingdom. It was co-promoted with TNT Extreme Wrestling.

Competitors

- Jack Harrop
- SHLAK
- Tim Strange
- Joe Dred
- Tommbie
- Iceman
- Rickey Shane Page
- Big Joe

=== Non-tournament match ===
1. Singles Match: Tate Mayfairs (c) def. Jimmy Lloyd for the TNT World Heavyweight Championship.

=== Round one ===
1. Casket Deathmatch: Jack Harrop def. Tommbie
2. Light Tubes & Thumbtacks Deathmatch: Joe Dred def. Big Joe
3. Dog Collar Match: SHLAK def. Tim Strange
4. Light Tubes & Darts Deathmatch: Rickey Shane Page def. Iceman

=== Semi-Final ===
1. Light Tubes, Chairs, Thumbtacks & Electricity Deathmatch: Jack Harrop def. SHLAK
2. Four Corners Of Pain: Joe Dred def. Rickey Shane Page

=== Final ===
1. Ultraviolent Rules: Jack Harrop def. Joe Dred

== See also ==
- IWA Mid-South King of the Deathmatch
