= Nick Gage =

American wrestler (born 1980)

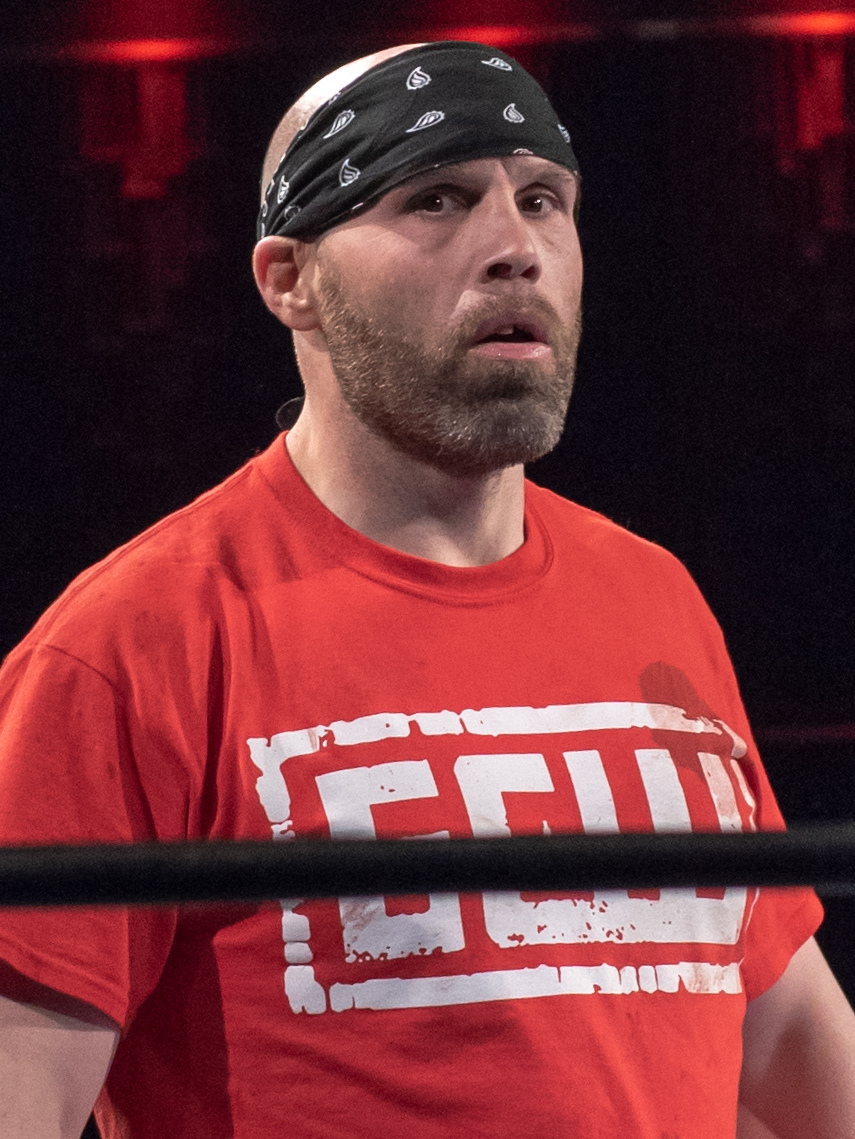
- Gage in 2019

Personal information
- Born: Nicholas William Wilson; September 22, 1980 (age 46) National Park, New Jersey, U.S.
- Relative: Justice Pain (brother)

Professional wrestling career
- Ring name(s): Nick Gage; Hardass Nick; Hardcore Nick
- Billed height: 5 ft 10 in (178 cm)
- Billed weight: 217 lb (98 kg)
- Billed from: National Park, New Jersey; Salt Lake City, Utah
- Trained by: CZW Wrestling School; John Zandig
- Debut: February 13, 1999

Nicholas William Wilson (born September 22, 1980), better known by his ring name Nick Gage, is an American professional wrestler. He currently performs on the independent circuit. He was the first man to win the "big three" of American deathmatch tournaments: the CZW Tournament of Death, the IWA Mid-South King of the Deathmatch, and the GCW Tournament of Survival, a feat which has only been achieved by one other man, Matt Tremont.

Along with being the first-ever CZW World Heavyweight Champion for Combat Zone Wrestling (CZW), until late 2010, Gage wrestled at nearly every CZW show and competed in more CZW matches than any other wrestler. In addition to these accomplishments, he has held the World Tag Team, Iron Man, Ultraviolent Underground, and Death Match championships during his CZW career. Gage's late brother, Chris Wilson, was also a professional wrestler; he performed in CZW under the ring name Justice Pain. The brothers even joined a stable known as “The H8 Club” with fellow CZW talent Matt Tremont, Nate Hatred, and Wifebeater.

In April 2011, Gage was sentenced to five years in prison after pleading guilty to second-degree bank robbery. He was ultimately released in 2016. After his release, he became an infamous name in the deathmatch indie scene and gained a cult following known as the Murder-Death-Kill Gang (often shortened to MDK). In his entrances, he is introduced as "representing The M.D.K Gang, The H8 Club, and all his comrades in prison, eastern block". His infamy as a "folk hero" of both independent American wrestling and of the deathmatch scene led him to be the subject of a 2021 episode of the docuseries Dark Side of the Ring. John Pollock of POST Wrestling describes Gage as a "cult figure" of professional wrestling. From February 2022 until October 2024, he was the sole contracted wrestler signed to Game Changer Wrestling (GCW), a promotion where he is a former three-time GCW World Champion.

== Early life ==
Nicholas William Wilson was born in National Park, New Jersey, on September 22, 1980. He was raised by his mother. As a child, he idolized NFL player Lawrence Taylor. He wanted to be a professional wrestler at a very young age, and later recalled watching NWA as a kid and calling WWF "corny". In the early 1990s, he was starting to lose his love for wrestling when ECW got him back into it. He would begin wrestling in backyard hardcore matches, making makeshift rings out of barbed wire, and wrestling his older brother Christopher and their friends. He and Christopher trained as professional wrestlers together. Christopher would become known by the ring name Justice Pain, though he retired in 2007 and died by suicide in 2020 when he jumped off the Walt Whitman Bridge.

== Professional wrestling career ==
=== Combat Zone Wrestling (1999–2010) ===
Gage is known for being the first ever CZW World Heavyweight Champion and for being part of the H8 Club tag team. Before teaming with Nate Hatred as the H8 Club, Gage won the CZW World Tag Team Championship with Zandig. Gage would also find great success in his run for the CZW Ironman Title, which he had several brutal matches with the likes of LOBO, The Wifebeater, Nick Mondo & Mad Man Pondo. One of the most notable matches from the time period was the first ever, 200 Light Tubes Death Match against The Wifebeater. He would later team up with Hatred and wrestle such teams as The Briscoe Brothers, VD, and The Backseat Boyz. Together, they won the tag team championship from the original H8 Club of Wifebeater and Justice Pain. Gage and Hatred would break up in 2003 when Hatred joined Messiah's stable, the Hi-V. Gage and Hatred would embark on a bloody feud against one another, competing in a Tables Match, Cage Match, Dog Collar Match, as well as a 200 Light Tubes Death Match. The two would trade the Big Japan Death Match Title between one another. Gage would take part in Cage of Death V: Suspended, as a part of Team Zandig, to take on the Hi-V.They feuded for nearly one year, and met in the Cage of Death match at Cage of Death V. At the end of the match, Hatred turned on Messiah and rejoined Gage. After reforming, they regained the tag championship, but lost it to The Blackout. At Cage of Death VI, The H8 Club of Nick Gage and Nate Hatred faced the H8 Club of Wifebeater and Justice Pain, with the winners winning the right to the H8 Club name. That night, Nick Gage and Justice Pain turned on their partners joined each other. They would then win the tag team championship and hold it for many months before losing to Necro Butcher and Toby Klein.

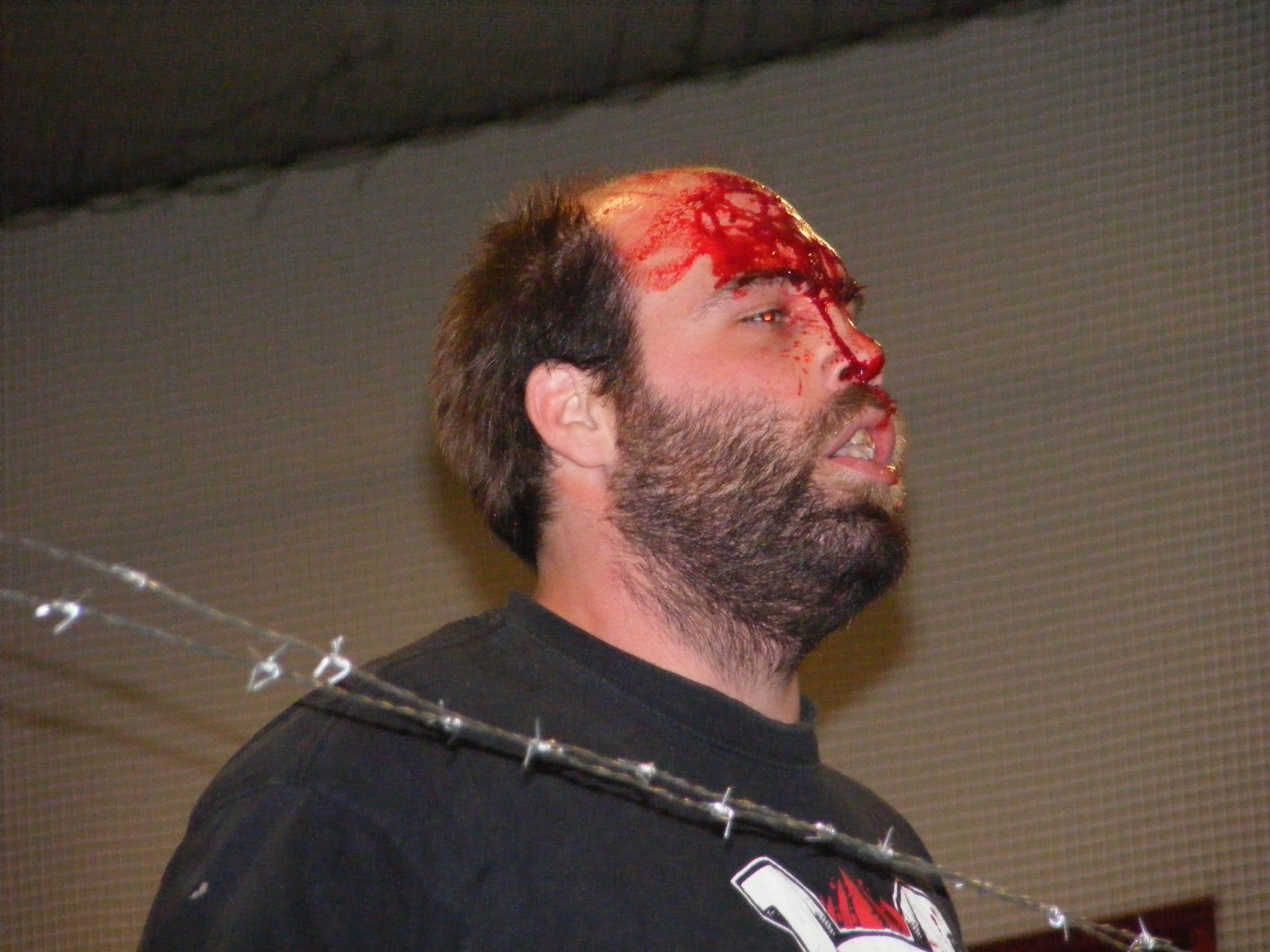
Gage bleeding during a match

Even after the loss of the Tag Titles, Gage and his brother would continue to feud with The Tough Crazy Bastards. Gage would find himself in the finals of the annual, Tournament of Death, along with the Necro Butcher and CZW owner, John Zandig. In this match, Gage would, figuratively, get set on fire, due to a botched Suplex, which saw Gage deliver it to Zandig, over the top rope and off the apron, onto a flaming board, which incorporated other Ultraviolent qualities. Gage would ultimately lose the match, as a result of being driven through several Panes of Glass, as well as a table, by Necro and his use of the Death Valley Driver. At the following show, Gage would interfere in Necro's No Rope Barbed Wire Match with one, J.C. Bailey. Gage, and his brother, Justice Pain's feud with Klein and The Butcher, would carry on all the way until Cage of Death 7. At Cage of Death 7 in the Cage of Death match, with Justice Pain and Zandig on Gage's team and Joker and Toby Klein on Necro's team. After Cage of Death, Gage and Necro Butcher fought in a triple threat no rope barbed wire match with J.C. Bailey for Bailey's Ultraviolent Underground Championship, which Gage captured that night. Gage later became color commentator for CZW DVDs, replacing Eddie Kingston. On July 29, 2006, Nick Gage won Tournament of Death 5 defeating Brain Damage, JC Bailey, and Drake Younger in the final round. After this, Gage began exhibiting strange behavior. He attacked LuFisto after she won the Iron Man title, had incidents with Zandig and Justice Pain, and insulted the fans on many occasions, most notably on commentary. He has since been removed from his commentary position. At Last Team Standing on October 14, he and Justice Pain made it to the finals of the tag team tournament. However, he left the arena before the last match. The next night, he lost the Ultraviolent Underground Championship to Drake Younger.

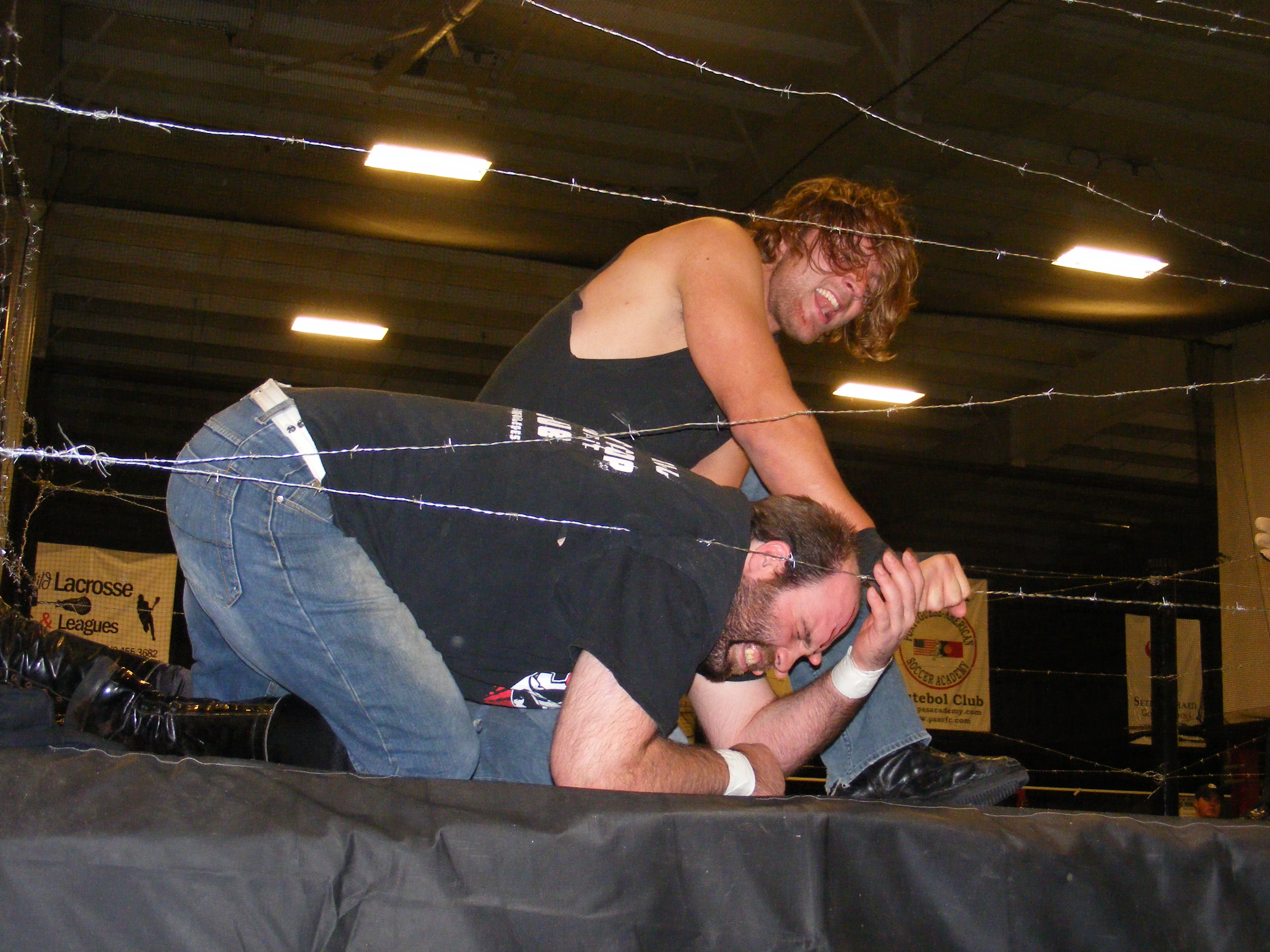
Gage wrestling Jon Moxley in 2010

At Night of Infamy 5, problems between Gage, Lobo, and Zandig continued, leading to a Cage of Death match between the three, which called for the loser of the bout to hang up the boots and retire. Before the match started, Gage's enemy LuFisto came to the ring and entered herself in the match. Gage won by pinning Zandig, forcing the CZW owner into retirement. The next month, Gage was scheduled to face LuFisto in a one on one match, but LuFisto was injured and the match was canceled. Gage would end up facing his brother, Justice Pain, for Pain's CZW Heavyweight Championship at CZW's eight anniversary show, H8. The match ended early due to the result of Gage receiving a stinger, as a result of a botched Pain Thriller from his brother. Nick Gage would remain out of action until the end of the year.

Gage made his return to CZW at the ninth annual Cage of Death event on December 8. He defeated Messiah and Ruckus in a Triple Threat Match to become a three time CZW World Heavyweight Champion. Gage's third reign as the Heavyweight Champion would last seven months, as he successfully defended his title against the likes of Drake Younger, Danny Havoc, Devon Moore, Ruckus & Eddie Kingston. However, Gage's run would come to an end at A Tangled Web, in which he lost to Drake Younger in a Tangled Web Death Match, due to interference from Notorious Inc. member, Devon Moore. Gage would face Moore at the following show in a No Ropes Barbed Wire Taipei Death Match. Gage would soon take up arms with his old tag team partner, Nate Hatred, to reform the infamous H8 Club. The H8 Club would go on to face Notorious Inc. at Down With The Sickness, as well as BLKOUT at Cage of Death X. Gage and Hatred would then move on to a bloody feud with Billy Gram's Cult Fiction, Brain Damage & Deranged, which, ultimately, culminated at CZW Tournament of Death 8, when Nick Gage defeated Deranged in a No Ropes Barbed Wire Fire Match. At that very same event, Gage would end up defeating Jon Moxley and Scotty Vortekz in the second round, advancing to the third, and final, round, against Thumbtack Jack. Gage would have to be airlifted to hospital after taking a bump onto a light tube, which resulted in a laceration severing an artery in his arm. Gage had made a full recovery and was back at CZW Best of the Best (only 1 week later) and participated in an attack on Thumbtack Jack.

Following his injury at TOD, and his attack on Thumbtack Jack at Best of the Best, Gage, along with Nate Hatred, would feud with The Best All Around in their hunt to regain the CZW Tag Team Titles. However, the hunt would prove to be a failure as they did not win the titles. The H8 Club would go on to turn heel, as they took up arms with the Switchblade Conspiracy, and attacked the new CZW owner, D. J. Hyde. In response to the attacks, Hyde would replace himself in the upcoming Tournament of Death: Rewind, and in his place would be Nick Gage, who would take on the former owner of CZW, John Zandig. Gage would defeat Zandig in the opening round in a Panes of Glass Match, but would come up on the losing end to MASADA in the second round in a Home Run Derby Death Match.

"The Future of Hardcore" would cross paths with Thumbtack Jack once more before the end of the year, as they faced one another for Jack's Ultraviolent Underground Championship, in a No Ropes Barbed Wire Match at Cage of Death XI. Jack would come out the victor in the contest, only to be attacked by a returning, J.C. Bailey. In May 2010, Gage went to Japan and wrestled for Big Japan Pro Wrestling after an interval of nearly 10 years. Gage, as a member of the stable CZW Japan originally created around 2000, competed at BJW 15th Anniversary Show, teaming with Jun Kasai and D. J. Hyde.

Apart from his performances in CZW's Tournament of Death, Gage has also taken part in the IWA Mid-South King of the Deathmatch tournament, having competed in four of them. During 2003, Gage entered the tournament during the CZW vs IWA-MS angle, which was going on at the time. Gage was able to take out Dysfunction in the first round, by defeating him in a 4-Corners of Pain Match, followed by defeating "Mean" Mitch Page in a Barbed Wire Canvas & Light Tube Ropes Match in the second round. However, Gage would end up on the losing end during the third round when he lost to Mad Man Pondo in a Bed of Nails & Caribbean Spider Web Match.

=== Various promotions (2007–2010) ===
After his return to professional wrestling in December 2007, Gage would return to the IWA-MS for their 2008 King of the Deathmatch. The Future of Hardcore, along with Danny Havoc, would defeat the former photographer, Whacks, in a first round Light Tubes & Ladders Match. The following night, Gage would defeat Freakshow in a Taped Fist Texas Death Match, but would be defeated by Devon Moore, his rival in CZW at the time, in a third round Pyramids of Pain Death Match, which featured Moore, Gage & "Diehard" Dustin Lee.

Less than a year later, Nick would find himself at the 2009 King of the Deathmatches. Nick Gage would lose in the opening round against Thumbtack Jack in a Deep Six Death Match, which consisted of Chains, Fish Hooks, and a No Ropes Barbed Wire stipulation.

"The Man" has also competed in two consecutive Carnage Cups. At Carnage Cup 2008, Gage defeated Devon Moore in a Fans Bring The Weapons Match in the first round, followed by defeating Prophet in an Ultraviolent Boards Match. However, Nick Gage would lose in the finals to Danny Havoc, in a 4-Way 200 Light Tubes Death Match also involving Freakshow and Corey Shaddix.

At the 2009 Carnage Cup, Gage would pick up a victory over Insane Lane and Freakshow in the first round, advancing himself to the second round. Gage would be defeated, once again, by Thumbtack Jack, in an Ultraviolent Boards & Thumbtack Cinderblocks Death Match.

=== Return to CZW (2014–2015) ===
During Tournament of Death 13 in 2014, D. J. Hyde announced that Nick Gage would return and be the first entrant into Tournament of Death 14. At CZW's Tangled Web on October 18, 2014, Matt Tremont challenged Gage to a match when he is released from prison.

Gage made his in ring return at Proving Grounds 2015 against Drew Gulak. At Tournament of Death 14, Gage returned to Tournament of Death, losing to Conor Claxton in the first round.

=== Return to the independent circuit (2015–present) ===
On April 10, 2015, Nick Gage made his first appearance in wrestling after being released from prison at Jersey Championship Wrestling's Tag Team J-Cup Tournament. Gage interrupted a promo by The Rogues, Jeff Cannonball and Brandon Kirk, hitting Cannonball with a chair and then his boot scrape and giving Kirk a chokebreaker. Gage and Lucky 13 would then lose in the first round to the Beast Squad, consisting of Monsta Mack and Kyle the Beast. After the match Gage turned on Lucky with a series of chokebreakers.

With Game Changer Wrestling (GCW) being his new main home since 2015, Nick Gage has declared Absolute Intense Wrestling his 2nd home for professional wrestling debuting in 2015. In 2017 Gage entered a feud with Tim Donst. On November 24, 2017, at AIW Hell On Earth 13, Gage defeated Donst to win the AIW Heavyweight Championship. Gage would retain against Donst in the rematch at GCW Rulers Of The World on December 29, 2017.

On January 14, 2018, Nick Gage made his Style Battle debut in Episode 8 of Season 1. Gage faced Walter in a no-contest which spilled outside of the ring when both men refused to listen to the Referee. The brawl ended when Keith Lee joined the fray and Clocked Gage in the face with a forearm.

July 28, 2018, Nick made his debut in Nova Pro Wrestling, losing a street fight to Tim Donst. The fight saw chair shots, a suplex through a closet door and a pack of light tubes over Gage's head ending the match.

On December 21, 2024 Nick Gage showed up at CZW Cage of Death after the Cage of Death match, marking his first time in CZW in 9 years.

=== Game Changer Wrestling (2017–2024; 2025–present) ===
On June 3, 2017, Nick Gage won the Game Changer Wrestling (GCW) Tournament of Survival 2, defeating Matt Tremont in the finals in the start of what would be a trilogy of matches between the two. On September 16, 2017, Tremont defeated Gage in the 2nd match of the trilogy in the finals of the Nick Gage Invitational II. Gage won the 3rd and final match, along with the GCW Heavyweight Championship, at GCW's 2nd anniversary event "Ready To Die" in a Three Layers Of Hell Match on December 16, 2017.

On April 5, 2019, Nick Gage defeated Shinjiro Otani at GCW's Joey Janela's Spring Break 3 Part 1. On April 6, at GCW Orange Cassidy's Doing Something, Nick Gage defeated UltraMantis Black in a Christmas-themed Deathmatch. At the end of the match, Maxwell Jacob Friedman (MJF) interfered and attacked Gage. The host of the event, Orange Cassidy, spat mist at MJF's face with Gage doing his finisher to MJF after.

During his title reign Gage became the longest-reigning GCW Heavyweight Champion with a record of 722 days, with his reign ending on December 8, 2019, after losing to AJ Gray. Due to his work as GCW World Champion, Gage was named by Sports Illustrated as the 10th ranked Wrestler of the Year in 2019. At the Spring Break event in April 2021, Gage defeated Rickey Shane Page to win the GCW World Championship for the second time, making him the only person to hold the championship more than once. On July 24, 2021, Gage lost the title to Matt Cardona at GCW Homecoming.

In January 2022, Gage and Matt Tremont defeated The Briscoes in the main event of The WRLD On GCW to win the GCW Tag Team Championships. On August 13, 2022, The Briscoes won back the Tag Team Championship from the so called “New H8 Club”.

At GCW's Fight Club event on October 8, Gage won the GCW World Championship for a third time defeating Jon Moxley in a Title vs. Career match.

On October 29, 2024, Gage announced his departure from GCW.

On August 23, 2025, Gage made his return to GCW, helping Shotzi Blackheart against Matt Cardona.

=== All Elite Wrestling (2021) ===
On the July 21, 2021, episode of AEW Dynamite, Gage made an appearance when MJF announced him as Chris Jericho's second "labour" for Fight For The Fallen in a No Disqualifications Match. At the event, Gage would lose to Jericho, who wrestled under the guise of his NJPW persona "The Painmaker."

== Personal life ==
In an interview in early 2010, Wilson stated he had been addicted to oxycontin and other painkillers for at least a decade. At the time of his bank robbery in 2010, he was homeless after being evicted from the house where he had lived with his girlfriend and her mother.

Wilson was married to Sondra Culbertson until her death on April 1, 2025.

In an interview with Chris Van Vliet, Wilson noted that he is a Christian and that he prays fairly often.

His brother Justice Pain was a wrestler that also worked for CZW. Pain died on January 24, 2020, after jumping off the Walt Whitman Bridge in Philadelphia after being chased by police.

== Legal issues ==
=== 2005 arrest ===
Wilson was arrested in 2005 for possession of stolen property. He pleaded guilty and paid a $250 fine as well as court costs.

=== Bank robbery and incarceration ===
On December 30, 2010, New Jersey authorities announced that they were seeking Wilson for robbing a PNC Bank in Collingswood, New Jersey, on December 22. During the robbery, Wilson, known for wearing a bandana to the ring, unmasked, handed a note to a female employee at the bank demanding money, and got approximately $3,000. Following the robbery, Wilson and his girlfriend went to Atlantic City to gamble. Wilson surrendered to authorities on December 31, 2010. On March 15, 2011, Wilson pleaded guilty to second degree robbery and on April 29 was sentenced to five years in prison. His guilty plea was part of an agreement for a lesser sentence. He was eligible for parole on March 31, 2015, after serving 85% of his five-year sentence. He was released on parole in April 2015 but violated parole and was re-incarcerated. He was released again in November 2016. Wilson was also ordered to pay compensation to both the bank and the female employee from whom he had demanded the money.

== Championships and accomplishments ==
- Absolute Intense Wrestling
  - AIW Absolute Championship (1 time)
- Big Japan Pro Wrestling
  - BJW Tag Team Championship (1 time) – with Zandig
- Combat Zone Wrestling
  - CZW World Heavyweight Championship (4 times)
  - CZW Iron Man Championship (2 times)
  - CZW World Tag Team Championship (5 times) – with Zandig (1), Nate Hatred (3), and Justice Pain (1)
  - CZW Ultraviolent Underground Championship (2 times)
  - CZW Interpromotional Hardcore Championship (1 time, inaugural)
  - CZW Death Match Championship (1 time)
  - Tournament of Death V (2006)
  - Tournament Of Death VS. Gorefest (2010)
  - CZW Hall of Fame (2009)
- Game Changer Wrestling
  - GCW World Championship (3 times)
  - GCW Tag Team Championship (1 time) – with Matt Tremont
  - Tournament of Survival II (2017)
  - Nick Gage Invitational Ultraviolent Tournament 4 (2019)
- Hardcore Hall of Fame
  - Class of 2025
- High Tension Wrestling
  - HTW Television Championship (1 time, current)
- Horror Slam Wrestling
  - Horror Slam Deathmatch Championship (1 time)
- IPW Hardcore Wrestling
  - IPW Tag Team Championship (1 time) – with Justice Pain
- Independent Wrestling Association Mid-South
  - IWA Mid-South Heavyweight Championship (1 time)
  - IWA Mid-South Strong Style Championship (1 time)
  - IWA Mid-South King of the Deathmatch (2018)
- Insane Championship Wrestling
  - ICW Heavyweight Championship (1 time)
- Jersey All Pro Wrestling
  - JAPW Tag Team Championship (1 time) – with Necro Butcher
- On Point Wrestling
  - OPW Heavyweight Championship (1 time)
- Pro Wrestling Illustrated
  - Indie Wrestler of the Year (2021)
  - Ranked No. 61 of the top 500 singles wrestlers in the PWI 500 in 2021
- Sports Illustrated
  - Ranked No. 10 of the top 10 male wrestlers in 2019
- SoCal Pro Wrestling
  - SoCal Uncensored Awards
    - SoCal-Match of the Year (2018)
