= CZW Medal of Valor Championship =

Details
- Promotion: Combat Zone Wrestling (CZW)
- Date established: November 19, 2014
- Date retired: 2020
Statistics
- First champion: Connor Claxton
- Most reigns: Connor Claxton and Eran Ashe (2 times)
- Longest reign: Connor Claxton (388 days)
- Shortest reign: El Cheapo (7 days)

The CZW Medal of Valor Championship was a championship contested at the Combat Zone Wrestling (CZW) training dojo.

Being a professional wrestling championship, it was not won via direct competition; it was instead won via a predetermined ending to a match. Each Medal of Valor match was a 2 out of 3 falls contest, until this stipulation was suspended by Mike Del upon him becoming champion. There were thirteen reigns by eleven different wrestlers.

== Title history ==
Key
No.	Overall reign number
Reign	Reign number for the specific champion
Days	Number of days held

No.	Champion	Championship change			Reign statistics		Notes	Ref.
No.	Champion	Date	Event	Location	Reign	Days	Notes	Ref.
1	Conor Claxton	November 19, 2014	Dojo Wars 14	Blackwood, NJ	1	388	Defeated Ryan Galeone in the finals of a 16-person tournament to become the first champion.	
2	Brittany Blake	December 12, 2015	Mega Event 1	Voorhees Township, NJ	1	158		
3	Qefka the Quiet	May 18, 2016	Dojo Wars 75	Blackwood, NJ	1	84		
4	Frankie Pickard	August 10, 2016	Dojo Wars 87	Blackwood, NJ	1	122		
5	Blackwater	December 10, 2016	Mega Event 3	Voorhees Township, NJ	1	251		
6	Kit Osbourne	August 18, 2017	Super Show 3	Blackwood, NJ	1	42		
7	Mike Del	September 29, 2017	Super Show 4	Blackwood, NJ	1	147		
8	Kit Osbourne	February 23, 2018	Greetings From Asbury Park	Asbury Park, NJ	2	61		
9	El Cheapo	April 25, 2018	Dojo Wars 163	Voorhees Township, NJ	1	7		
10	Stefan Pennington	May 2, 2018	Dojo Wars 164	Voorhees Township, NJ	1	170	Johnny Jäger appeared to win the title at Super Show 10 on 8/15/2018, but it was revealed at Dojo Wars 179 that referee Echo Endless was going to disqualify Pennington for his actions during the match. Jäger would remain as the winner of the match, but not the title.	
11	Eran Ashe	October 19, 2018	Super Show XII	Voorhees Township, NJ	1	252	Captain Dojo Wars (Ari Abbott) won an opportunity to name the stipulation in a title match. He chose to have Pennington defend against Ashe.	
12	DK Meadows	June 28, 2019	Super Show XXI: Silver Vs. Taylor	Voorhees Township, NJ	1	119	Relaxed Rules Where There Must Be A Winner.	
13	Eran Ashe	October 25, 2019	Super Show XXV: Meadows v Ashe III	Voorhees Township, NJ	2	68 - 277	Doors Match	
—		N/A	—	—				

== Combined reigns ==
Rank	Wrestler	No. of reigns	Combined days
1	Eran Ashe	2	320- 529
2	Conor Claxton	1	388
3	Blackwater	1	251
4	Stefan Pennington	1	170
5	Brittany Blake	1	158
6	Mike Del	1	147
7	Frankie Pickard	1	122
8	DK Meadows	1	119
9	Kit Osbourne	2	103
10	Qefka The Quiet	1	84
11	El Cheapo	1	7
