= Jeff Cannonball =

American professional wrestler (1987–2026)

Personal information
- Born: June 24, 1987 Highland Park, New Jersey, U.S.
- Died: October 8, 2026 (aged 39)
- Spouse: Terra Calaway (m. 2020)
- Children: 1

Professional wrestling career
- Ring names: Trollzilla; Jeff Guerrero; Cannonball; Jeff Cannonball
- Billed height: 5 ft 9 in (175 cm)
- Billed weight: 400 lb (181 kg)
- Trained by: Corey Havoc; Corvis Fear
- Debut: 2010
- Retired: December 27, 2024
- Musical career
- Genre: Punk rock
- Instruments: Bass guitar; vocals
- Formerly of: Black Kites; Altered Boys

Jeff Guerriero (June 24, 1987 – October 8, 2026), better known as Jeff Cannonball, was an American professional wrestler and punk musician active on the independent scene. He was best known for his work in hardcore matches for promotions on the East Coast.

== Professional wrestling career ==
Guerriero performed for independent promotions, Major League Wrestling, Juggalo Championship Wrestling, Combat Zone Wrestling, Frontier Martial Arts Wrestling, and Limitless Wrestling, among others during his career.

== Music career ==
Guerriero was formerly a vocalist for the punk rock band Black Kites, before becoming the bass player for the punk rock band Altered Boys.

== Personal life and death ==
Guerriero began dating fellow professional wrestler Samantha "Sam" Guerriero (better known as Terra Calaway) in March 2016 and they married in March 2020. Their son was born in November 2023.

He was diagnosed with ALS in May 2025. Following the announcement wrestling promoter Joey Janela organized a benefit show called CannonballFest which was held in September 2025, Interspecies Wrestling held an event called CannonBrawl in his honor in October 2025, and another benefit event named Cannonbalooza was held on June 2, 2026. He was inducted into the Deathmatch Hall of Fame in 2025.

Guerriero died on October 8, 2026, at the age of 39, due to complications related to ALS. His death was announced by his wife on social media.

== Championships and accomplishments ==
- H2O Wrestling
  - H2O Heavyweight Championship (2 times)
  - H2O Tag Team Championship (2 times with Mitch Vallen as the Lone Rangers)
  - H2O Danny Havoc Hardcore Championship (1 time)
- STAR Pro-Wrestling
  - STAR Pro Heavyweight Championship (1 time)
- Interspecies Wrestling
  - ISDub Falls Count Everywhere Championship (1 time)

== See also ==
- List of premature professional wrestling deaths
- List of people with motor neuron disease
