= Combat Zone Wrestling =

American professional wrestling promotion

- Logo since 2021
- Acronym: CZW
- Founded: 1999
- Style: Hardcore wrestling
- Headquarters: Newark, Delaware, U.S.
- Founder: John Zandig
- Owners: John Zandig (1999–2009); D. J. Hyde (2009–present); Dave Marquez (2017–2019); Steve Karel (2019–present)
- Sister: Maven Bentley Association; Women Superstars United
- Website: czwrestling.com

Combat Zone Wrestling (CZW) is an American independent professional wrestling promotion founded in 1999 by John Zandig. Commonly associated with the 2000s hardcore wrestling genre, early CZW shows showcased a brand of wrestling dubbed by the promotion as "ultraviolence". Early CZW matches featured items such as ladders, tables, steel folding chairs, thumbtacks, barbed wire-covered baseball bats, weed whackers, light tubes, and panes of glass. The promotion filled a niche for hardcore wrestling fans that had been left open by the folding of Extreme Championship Wrestling (ECW) in 2001.

In 2009, CZW's founder John Zandig sold the promotion to CZW wrestler D. J. Hyde. Although hardcore wrestling remained present in CZW shows, under Hyde the frequency of hardcore matches would gradually decrease. Throughout the 2010s, CZW was part of the Triangle of Unity (also known as the Triangle of Ultraviolence) alliance with Japanese promotion Big Japan Pro Wrestling and German promotion Westside Xtreme Wrestling. In 2016, CZW was covered by Vice Media in the documentary Bloodlust: Tournament of Death.

After a long hiatus during the COVID-19 pandemic, CZW returned to promoting events in 2021. After its return, CZW stopped holding hardcore matches, apart from their annual Tournament of Death. CZW events have since been held in Blackwood, New Jersey and Havre de Grace, Maryland, along with stops in other east coast venues. In 2024, CZW again placed an emphasis on hardcore wrestling, with the promotion bringing back its Cage of Death event and seeing the returns of its alumni like Nick Gage and Rickey Shane Page.

== History ==
=== John Zandig ownership ===
==== Pro Wrestling Academy ====
Combat Zone Wrestling's Pro Wrestling Academy was founded in New Jersey by John Zandig in 1998. After training the classes alone, Zandig enlisted the help of Jon Dahmer, who helped train with Zandig for the next three classes. The first student trained was Lobo, who worked with Zandig before their wrestling careers. Nick Gage and Justice Pain were the next two students to be trained by Zandig. The fourth student and fifth student trained was TCK and Ric Blade. The academy relocated to The 2300 Arena in Philadelphia, Pennsylvania, and briefly merged with the Chikara Wrestle Factory. Shortly after the second class, the academy separated from the Chikara Wrestle Factory and moved its operation back to New Jersey, then back to Philadelphia, and now to Blackwood, New Jersey. Previously, Drew Gulak was the head trainer of the academy, with members of the CZW locker room joining them every session.

==== Japan connection ====
Early 2000 saw CZW establish a connection with the death match wrestling orientated company Big Japan Pro Wrestling, credited to have popularized the death match wrestling style that CZW continued to emphasize in the United States. Both promotions exchanged talent throughout 2000 and 2001 and engaged in a "CZW vs BJW" storyline. The "CZW Warriors" in BJW included Wifebeater, Nick Gage, Trent Acid, Justice Pain, Johnny Kashmere, Nate Hatred, Ruckus, Nick Berk, as well as John Zandig as the leader.

In 2001 in Japan, the Wifebeater and Ryuji Yamakawa faced off in a match which ended Yamakawa's career after the Wifebeater chokensteined him off the ring apron through a table set up on the outside. In a 'shoot interview' Wifebeater stated communication difficulties between the two were a major factor which led to the incident. Wifebeater pleaded that they should not execute the manoeuvre, though the move went ahead and saw Yamakawa's head slam against the concrete. Both wrestlers have stated that it was half of each other's fault when Yamakawa did not take the move as it should be performed; back first, though some even blame the Japanese tables, which are smaller, more sturdy and harder to break, the table in this incident did not break and simply slipped from underneath of Yamakawa thus only connecting with his legs, causing his head to take the impact on the concrete.

The reason for the collapse of the inter-promotional deal is uncertain. After a controversial exploding panes of glass match, between Zandig and Mitsuhiro Matsunaga in Japan, 2001, Zandig left BJW with the BJW death match title belt. Many wrestlers of both promotions at the time were confused about the collapse between the two.

==== Champs Arena, attempt at pay-per-view, and Fake You TV ====
In February 2000, the company would relocate from their home arena in Mantua Township, New Jersey, to Champs Soccer Arena, in Sewell, New Jersey. They would remain there for two years until the state of New Jersey banned the use of ultraviolent weapons (such as glass, barbed wire, and fire) in wrestling. To counteract the ban, CZW branched out from New Jersey to Delaware, where they would host their more ultraviolent shows throughout the rest of the company's existence.

On June 25, 2000, CZW was scheduled to host a pay-per-view event, which was to be headlined by Terry Funk and Atsushi Onita in an explosion match in a rematch of their FMW 4th Anniversary Show encounter. However, the match fell through when Onita cancelled and in its place Nick Gage and the Wifebeater performed in the first ever 200 light tubes match in the United States. The show was later called 'They Said it Couldn't be Done'.

In 2001 WGTW-48 began broadcasting CZW footage under the title Fake You TV, which was available in many northeastern states in the US. The Show lasted until June 2004

==== Viking Hall debut and the "Indy Wars" ====
Anticipating their Cage Of Death 3 (COD) show at the end of 2001, the company needed a bigger venue and made their debut in the ECW Arena. The venue was the first sellout in the building since the era of ECW, and hundreds were turned away from the biggest show in CZW's history.

At that time several wrestling promotions were competing for the Northeast fan base that had been left behind by ECW. In what was later known as the "Indy Wars", CZW, XPW, and 3PW all competed for control of the ECW Arena. XPW were given the lease to the arena in late 2002 after Rob Black offered around $60,000. On December 12, 2002, as part of a triple-header of wrestling in Philadelphia Ring of Honor ran shows in conjunction with CZW and 3PW in what was to be the latter two promotions last events in the arena. During CZW's event, Zandig publicly stated that they had offered $32,000 to stay in the arena, but also stated that with the $10,000 a month XPW would need to pay for the building, the lease would not last long. Accompanied by incidents relating to Extreme Associates, XPW later folded in 2003. CZW made their return to the arena on March 8, 2003.

==== ECW tribute show and Italy ====
Shortly after their return to the former ECW Arena, on May 10, 2003, the company promoted a show entitled "Then & Now: A Decade of Defiance." The event was a tribute to ECW and to all previous promotions that held events at New Alhambra Arena during the last ten years.

On October 25, 2003, the promotion made their debut in Italy with an attendance record of 2,000 people filled the Palasport Arena in Pistoia, later on March 27, 2004, the company returned for another event which featured Sabu in a tables match this time only drawing 500 people in Parma.

==== IWA Mid-South invasion ====
On June 14, 2003, mid-south based promotion Independent Wrestling Association Mid-South (IWA-MS) invaded CZW as part of a kayfabe angle which led to an inter-promotional feud throughout most of 2003. During the night of the initial invasion, the crowd was so riled up that they began hurling chairs into the ring at Ian Rotten, Corporal Robinson, and J. C. Bailey of IWA-MS. The Delaware wrestling commissioner, who was in the ring at the time, was struck in the side of the head. The feud was based in both promotions and a major part led into CZW's Tournament of Death 2, five IWA-MS wrestlers and three CZW wrestlers entered into the 8-man single elimination tournament. The semi-final saw two CZW wrestlers John Zandig and Nick Mondo compete in a 2 out of 3 light tube log cabin match, a match which is said to have ended Mondo's career (However, in Mondo's shoot interview he stated that T.O.D 2 was going to be his last appearance anyway). Towards the end of the match Zandig Mother F'N Bombed Mondo off a 40 ft rooftop as both men crashed into tables and a light tube log cabin contraption. Mondo continued the Tournament with 3 broken bones in his wrist and won the tournament after defeating Ian Rotten in a 200 light tubes final.

==== Zandig hanging incident ====
During John Zandig's feud with heel stable the Hi-5, Zandig was suspended in the middle of the ring by meat hooks from the roof of the arena. The incident led into the setup of the main event at Cage of Death 2003, where a cage was suspended from the roof, the event was called Cage of Death 5: Suspended. The company remained successful that year and had a sold-out crowd for their annual Cage of Death show.

==== Last years of Zandig's ownership ====
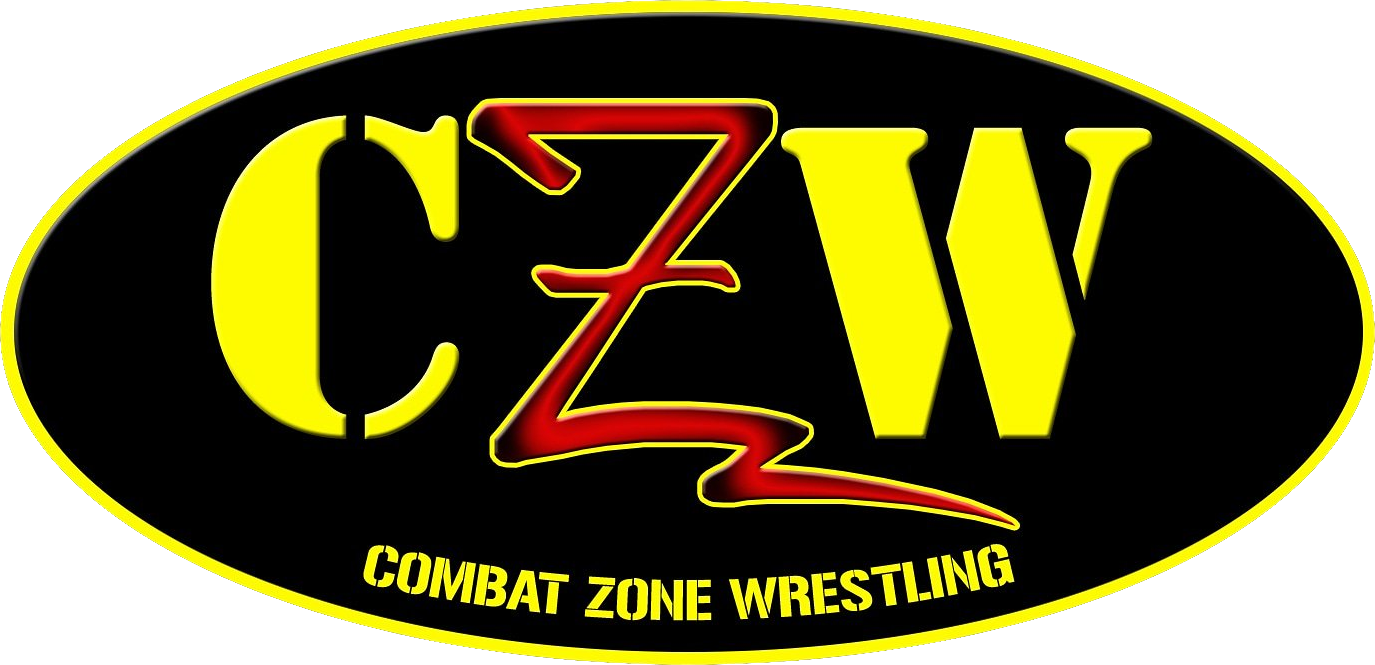
The logo of CZW between 2008 and 2020

During 2005, CZW established a connection with local promotion Chikara, which established into a joint training school known as 'The Wrestle Factory' in the New Alhambra Arena, with head trainers Chris Hero and Mike Quackenbush. During 2007, CZW departed from the training school to form their own, much like their older school.

The company remained strong in the forthcoming years with new booker, Mike Burns, who was responsible for one of the best runs in the promotion's history. Pancoast Productions, a company which for many years was responsible for a lot of CZW's logos and TitanTron work, among other things, briefly departed from the company in late 2005 after an altercation between Pancoast Productions owner Mike Pancoast and John Zandig.

At their Cage of Death 7 show at the end of 2005, CZW roster member Chris Hero cut a promo challenging "American Dragon" Bryan Danielson of Ring of Honor (ROH) to a match at the next show. The angle would develop into the enter promotion "CZW vs ROH" storyline which would see CZW and ROH co-promotion several shows around the Northeastern United States.

=== D. J. Hyde ownership ===
==== Expansion and international partnerships ====
D. J. Hyde purchased CZW from Zandig in 2009. The first show booked by Hyde was Tangled Web 2. Since then, CZW has held its first shows in Germany, Massachusetts, Ohio, South Carolina and Indiana. They also returned to Japan and has brought back previous stars like Homicide, The Briscoe Brothers, Derek Frazier, and BJ Whitmer. In 2014 CZW toured England as part of a cross promotion with Tidal Championship Wrestling.

In January 2012, CZW & ECW's arena was sold and was later temporarily closed, not reopening until December 2013. The closing of the venue forced CZW to look for a new home, now running monthly events at Flyers Skate Zone in Voorhees, New Jersey. After 13 years in business together, in 2013 Combat Zone Wrestling and Smart Mark Home Video ceased partnership after a falling-out. Beginning in February 2013 until 2015, all Combat Zone Wrestling events were filmed, edited, and distributed by RF Video. On July 12, 2017, it was reported Dave Marquez had bought into Combat Zone Wrestling as part-owner of the company.

CZW also partners with other promotions like: Westside Xtreme Wrestling (wXw) for their German events, Serbia's Combat League Wrestling (CLW), and the remnants of Frontier Martial-Arts Wrestling (FMW), in a one-time match between Matt Tremont and Atsushi Onita.

==== GCW incident ====
On December 9, 2017, CZW's Cage of Death 19 show ended with Nick Gage and Brett Lauderdale from rival promotion Game Changer Wrestling (GCW) invading the ring. Reportedly, CZW booker Giancarlo Dittamo had pitched an invasion angle to D. J. Hyde, but was shot down. Without telling anyone, Dittamo decided to go through with the angle regardless. Police were called to the arena, but Dittamo, Gage and Lauderdale had all left the venue by the time they arrived. Hyde was reportedly "beyond furious" over the incident, firing Dittamo from CZW.

== CZW Studios ==
CZW Studios is a video-on-demand service owned by Combat Zone Wrestling. All major CZW events air live on the service, which also features matches from the promotion's archives, dating back to 2002. The service has a current monthly subscription price of $9.99. In 2015, CZW Studios signed a deal for pay-per-views on In Demand.

== Annual events ==
Event	Year(s) active	Signature gimmick
CZW Cage of Death	1999–2019, 2024–present	Featured an ultraviolent cage match
CZW Anniversary	2000–present	Celebrates the anniversary of CZW's inaugural show
CZW Best of the Best	2001–present	Features a junior heavyweight tournament
CZW Tournament of Death	2002–present	Features a deathmatch tournament
CZW Night of Infamy	2002–2019	–
CZW Beyond The Barrier	2002	–
CZW Deja Vu	2002, 2003, 2005, 2008, 2010, 2011, 2013, 2014, 2015	Featured barbed wire matches
CZW Down With the Sickness	2005	Paid tribute to Chri$ Ca$h, a deceased CZW wrestler
CZW Tangled Web	2008	Featured barbed wire spiderweb matches
CZW High Stakes	2002, 2004, 2005, 2010, 2014	Featured High Stakes matches
CZW Super Saturday	2012	–
CZW Dojo Wars	2014–present	CZW's development brand featuring trainees from the CZW Pro Wrestling Academy
CZW LimeLight	2022–present	–
CZW Combine	2021–present	CZW's development brand featuring wrestlers from across the United States trying out for the promotion

=== Current ===
==== Cage of Death ====
CZW's biggest show of the year. It always features the "Cage of Death" match, a steel cage with various weapons, objects, and plenty of wrestling violence. Electrified cage walls, cacti, ladders, tables, steel folding chairs, barbed wire, light tubes, fire, glass, thumbtacks, and baseball bats have been used in it. Matches that also always include the high risk wrestling stunts and bumps. The Cage of Death also has different formats and stipulations: singles, tag team, or gauntlet.

==== Tournament of Death ====
CZW's yearly death-match tournament features the use of fire, weed whackers, light tubes, and other weapons. Previous winners include Wifebeater (TOD 1 and 3), Nick Mondo (TOD 2), Necro Butcher (TOD 4), Nick Gage (TOD 5 & TOD vs. Gorefest), Drake Younger (TOD 6), and Brain Damage (TOD: FF), among others.

==== Best of the Best ====
CZW's yearly junior heavyweight tournament that differs from other CZW events in how it emphasizes athleticism more than the use of weapons. Previous winners include Winger, Trent Acid, B-Boy, Sonjay Dutt, Mike Quackenbush, Ruckus, Joker, Sabian, Egotistico Fantastico, Adam Cole, and Sami Callihan, among others.

==== Dojo Wars ====
Dojo Wars is CZW's developmental brand associated with their training school and is used to showcase CZW prospects.

==== LimeLight ====
CZW's secondary live show.

==== Combine ====
Wrestlers from across the country come to CZW to showcase their talent to earn a spot on the CZW main roster.

=== Former ===
==== Deja Vu ====
The first show featured a bloody barbed wire match between Zandig and Lobo. Since then the Deja Vu card had been held on an almost yearly basis.

==== Chris Cash Memorial Show ====
CZW had previously ran a memorial tribute event to Christopher "Chri$ Ca$h" Bauman titled "Down with the Sickness" after Chri$ Ca$h's theme song from the band Disturbed. The show originally started as a double header afternoon show, with another CZW event taking place later in the evening. Many former CZW trainees made appearances on past events, including longtime friend GQ, who had wrestled on all of the events.

==== Tangled Web ====
CZW previously held this event series in which a barbed-wire "spiderweb" is used.

== Championships ==
=== Current champions ===
Championship	Current champion(s)	Reign	Date won	Days held	Location	Notes
CZW World Heavyweight Championship	AKIRA	1	September 5, 2026	35+	Townsend, Delaware	Defeated Eran Ashe at CZW Tournament Of Death to win the title.
CZW World Tag Team Championship	TBA	Vacant	TBA	TBA	TBA	
CZW Ultraviolent Underground Championship	SHLAK	1	March 1, 2026	223+	Trenton, New Jersey	Defeated Eric Ryan, Hoodfoot, Jimmy Lloyd, Lucky 13 and Nick Gage at CZW 27th Anniversary: Deej And Ricks Ultraviolent Adventure.
Crypt Video Championship	Anthony Gangone	1	August 29, 2026	42+	Youngstown, Ohio	Defeated Jackie Thad at CZW Prelude To Violence 2026 to win the vacant title.

=== Defunct championships ===
Championship	Last champion(s)	Reign	Date won	Days held	Location	Notes
CZW Interpromotional Hardcore Championship (Note: The championship was also referred to as the "NWA/CZW Interpromotional Hardcore Championship", as it was additionally recognized by NWA New Jersey.)	Lobo	1	May 29, 1999	343	Malaga, New Jersey	Defeated John Kronus and TCK in a three-way match for the vacated title at a live event.
CZW Death Match Championship (Note: The championship was often referred to by CZW as the "Big Japan Death Match Championship", as it had splintered off from Big Japan Pro Wrestling's Deathmatch Heavyweight Championship.)	Nate Hatred	2	August 9, 2003	N/A	Philadelphia, Pennsylvania	Defeated Nick Gage at Aftermath – The Wounds Run Deep!.
CZW Iron Man Championship	Egotistico Fantastico	1	June 13, 2009	28	Philadelphia, Pennsylvania	Defeated Sami Callihan at Best of the Best 9.
CZW World Junior Heavyweight Championship	Greg Excellent	2	March 14, 2015	210	Voorhees Township, New Jersey	Defeated Alexander James at Deja Vu.
CZW Medal of Valor Championship	Eran Ashe	2	October 25, 2019	N/A	Voorhees Township, New Jersey	Defeated DK Meadows at Dojo Wars Super Show XXV: Meadows v Ashe III.
CZW Dojo Wars Tag Team Championship	Valor (Dominick Denaro & Kee Min)	1	December 21, 2019	N/A	Voorhees Township, New Jersey	Became the inaugural champions at a Dojo Wars event.
CZW Wired Championship	Vacant	–	January 1, 2021	–	Voorhees , New Jersey	Vacated and then retired when previous champion KC Navarro left CZW.

== Sister promotion ==
=== Maven Bentley Association ===
Maven Bentley Association
- Founded: 2005
- Headquarters: Philadelphia, Pennsylvania
- Founder: Maven Bentley
- Website: Maven Bentley Association, LLC.

The Maven Bentley Association (MBA) is the sister promotion to CZW operated by Maven Bentley.

In 2007, CZW had a short lived interpromotional feud with the MBA. In storyline, MBA's founder Maven Bentley was portrayed as a power-mad middle manager who ran amok in CZW and abused his authority. Bentley hired a few of CZW's own wrestlers to help him take over the promotion. Those wrestlers included Diehard Dustin Lee, Scotty Vortekz, Brain Damage, and D. J. Hyde. Bentley himself got involved physically in the feud as he was scheduled to face Lobo in a lumberjack strap match at Cage of Death 9. Bentley would lose the match, ending the feud.

The MBA returned to The Arena for its Economic Crisis event on January 31, 2009.

==== Championships ====
Championship:	Champion(s):	Defeated:	Date won:	Location:
MBA Heavyweight Championship	Andy Sumner	D. J. Hyde	June 6, 2008	Philadelphia, Pennsylvania
MBA Tag Team Championship	BLKOUT (Eddie Kingston and Sabian)	Cory Kastle and Jon Dahmer	June 21, 2006	Philadelphia, Pennsylvania
MBA A-Maven-Can Idol Heavyweight Championship	Daunte Sweet	Derek Frazier	April 16, 2005	Philadelphia, Pennsylvania

== See also ==
- CZW Hall of Fame
