= A. C. Mack =

American professional wrestler

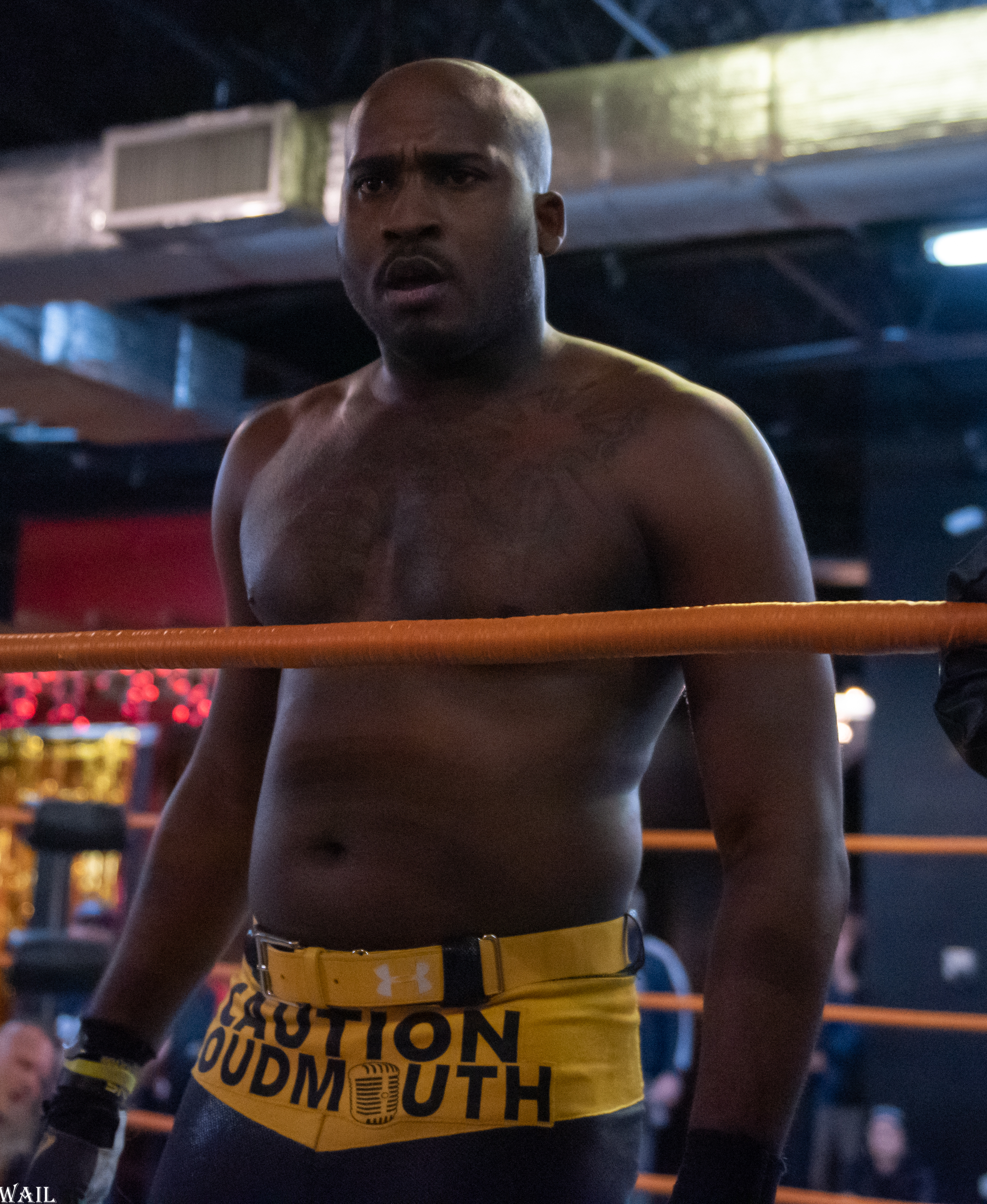
- Mack in December 2019

Personal information
- Born: Amen-Ra Mackey; September 27, 1992 (age 33) Atlanta, Georgia, United States
- Spouse: Rico Gonzalez (m. 2024)

Professional wrestling career
- Ring name(s): Aaron Mackey; A. C. Mack
- Billed height: 6 ft 1 in (185 cm)
- Billed weight: 187 lb (85 kg)
- Trained by: A. R. Fox
- Debut: June 2, 2016
- Retired: June 16, 2023

Amen-Ra Mackey (born September 27, 1992), better known by the ring name A. C. Mack, is an American professional wrestler.

== Professional wrestling career ==
He began to train with A.R. Fox and debuted in 2016. He worked for independent promotions in the South of the United States. As part of ACTION Wrestling, he became the ACTION Champion, a title he held for a record of 798 days. In 2018, he worked in a squash match for the WWE development territory, WWE NXT, losing against Dominik Dijakovic. On January 21, 2022, Mack defeated Alex Shelley to win the Independent Wrestling World Championship. With his title win, he became the first male openly gay world champion. Mackey retired from wrestling on June 16, 2023. He pointed that he "lost the spark" for professional wrestling and didn't want to take a spot for other wrestlers.

== Professional wrestling style and persona ==
Mack uses a crossed-armed facebuster as a finisher called Mack 10.

== Championship and accomplishments ==
- ACTION Wrestling
  - ACTION Championship (1 time, inaugural)
  - ACTION Title Tournament (2018)
  - ACTION Award (5 times)
    - Superstar of the Year (2022)
    - Match of the Year (2022) – Vs. Alex Shelley at "Southeast First"
    - Promo of the Year (2022) – "Southeast First"
    - Feud of the Year (2022) – Vs. IWTV/The North
    - Moment of the Year (2022) – Winning the IWTV Independent Wrestling World Championship at Southeast First
- Anarchy Wrestling
  - Anarchy Television Championship (1 time)
  - Anarchy Television Title Tournament (2018)
- Disruptor Pro Wrestling
  - Disruptor Heavyweight Championship (1 time)
- Independent Wrestling.TV
  - IWTV Independent Wrestling World Championship (1 time)
- Intense Wrestling Entertainment
  - IWE Mayhem Championship (2 times)
- National Championship Wrestling
  - NCW Heavyweight Championship (1 time)
  - NCW Junior/Light Heavyweight Championship (1 time)
  - NCW Tag Team Championship (1 time) - with Jaxxon Vile
- Ohio Wrestling Alliance
  - OWA Heavyweight Championship (1 time)
- Peachstate Wrestling Alliance
  - PWA No Limits Championship (3 times)
- Prime Time Pro Wrestling
  - Pride of Prime Time (2020)
- Pro Wrestling Illustrated
  - Ranked No. 25 of the top 500 singles wrestlers in the PWI 500 in 2022
- Scenic City Invitational
  - Scenic City Rumble (2019)
  - Scenic City Invitational Tournament (2021)
- Southern Honor Wrestling
  - SHW Championship (1 time)
- Southern Underground Pro
  - SUP Bonestorm Championship (1 time)
- TWE Chattanooga
  - TWE Championship (1 time)
  - TWE Pure Division Championship (1 time)
- Unsanctioned Pro
  - Unsanctioned Pro Heavyweight Championship (1 time)
- World Wrestling Alliance 4
  - WWA4 Heavyweight Championship (2 times)
  - WWA4 Tag Team Championship (2 times) - with David Ali

== Personal life ==
Mack is openly gay and married fellow pro wrestler Rico Gonzalez in June 2024 at Fortín del Puerto Hermina in Puerto Rico.
