= Alex Shelley =

American professional wrestler (born 1983)

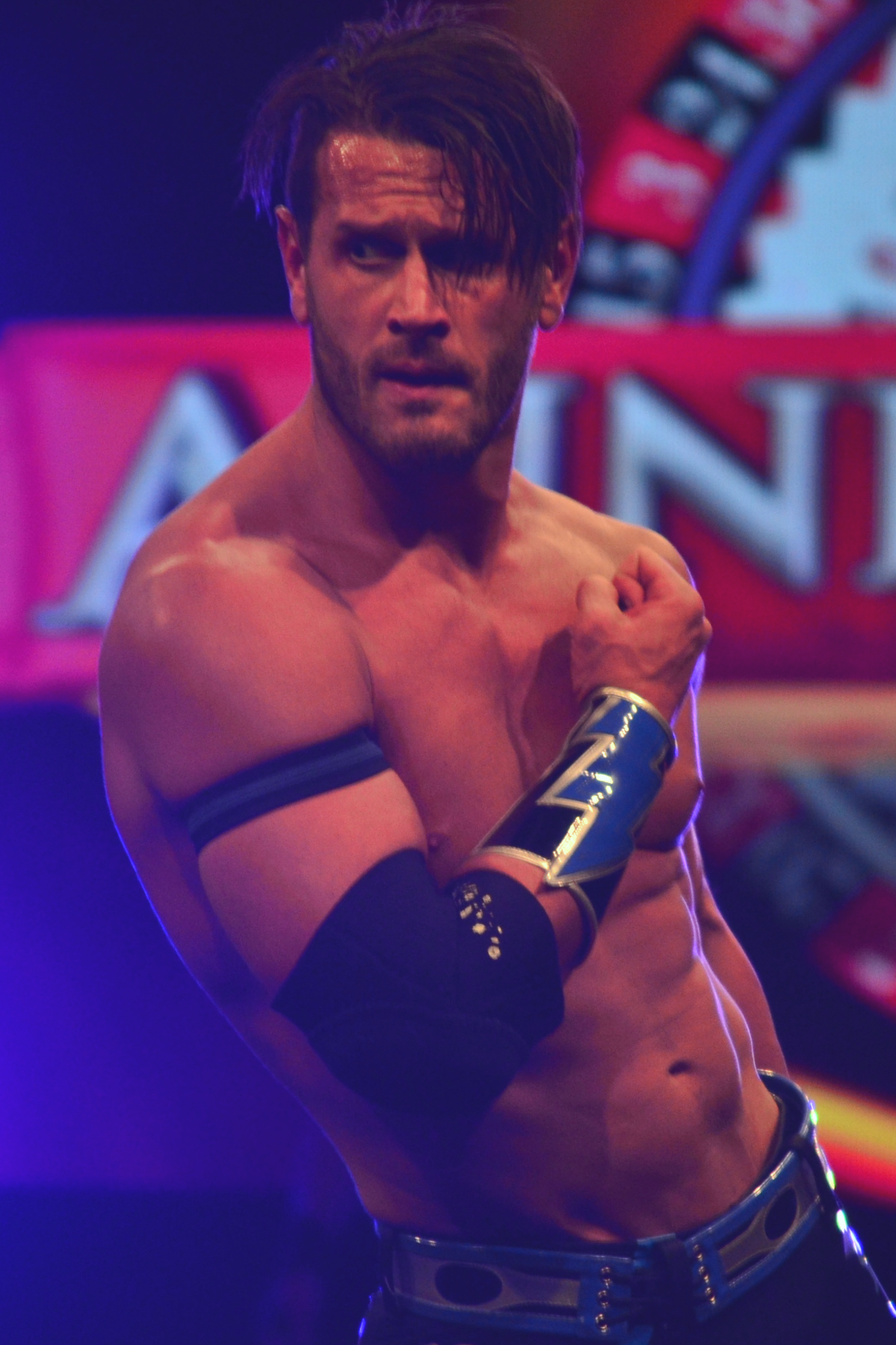
- Shelley in 2016

Personal information
- Born: Patrick Kenneth Martin; May 23, 1983 (age 43) Detroit, Michigan, U.S.

Professional wrestling career
- Ring name(s): Alex Shelley; David Decker
- Billed height: 5 ft 10 in (178 cm)
- Billed weight: 215 lb (98 kg)
- Billed from: Detroit, Michigan
- Trained by: Breyer Wellington; Truth Martini; Joe E. Legend; Scott D'Amore
- Debut: March 2, 2002

Patrick Kenneth Martin (born May 23, 1983), better known by his ring name Alex Shelley, is an American professional wrestler and musician. He is signed to All Elite Wrestling (AEW), where he performs as one-half of the Motor City Machine Guns alongside Chris Sabin. In music, he is the vocalist and guitarist of the rock band GRPPLNG.

He is widely known for his tenure in Total Nonstop Action Wrestling (TNA), where he is a former TNA 2006 World X Cup Tournament winner, a former one-time TNA World Heavyweight Champion, former one-time TNA X Division Champion, former three-time TNA World Tag Team Champions (with Sabin as Motor City Machine Guns), and won the Gauntlet for the Gold in 2008. He is recognized as the tenth Triple Crown winner in TNA, having won the TNA World Championship, the X Division Championship, and the Tag Team Championship.

Martin first rose to fame on the independent circuit, and gained breakout success while performing for Ring of Honor (ROH), having won the ROH World Tag Team Championship with Sabin. He is also known for his tenures in Japan with Pro Wrestling Zero1-Max and New Japan Pro-Wrestling (NJPW), where in the latter promotion, he is a former three-time IWGP Junior Heavyweight Tag Team Champion alongside Kushida as one-half of the Time Splitters, and a former Strong Openweight Tag Team Champion as one-half of the Motor City Machine Guns. From 2024 to 2026, Shelley performed in WWE and would win the WWE Tag Team Championship with Sabin. Shelley, alongside Sabin, signed with AEW in the latter year.

== Professional wrestling career ==
=== Training and early career (2002–2003) ===
Martin initially started training in early 2002 under Breyer Wellington and Truth Martini. He then joined the Border City Wrestling's Can-Am Wrestling School, and began training under Joe E. Legend and Scott D'Amore. Martin debuted in March 2002 as Alex Shelley, a name he created by combining the forename of Alex, the protagonist of the 1962 novel A Clockwork Orange, with the surname of Pete Shelley, the lead singer of the 1970s punk rock band the Buzzcocks. Six months into his career, he was hospitalized with a shattered jaw when he slipped on a wet ring and hit the unpadded ring apron. Shelley had steel plates inserted into his jaw as a result. After eight months, Shelley joined Ian Rotten's IWA Mid-South promotion. He worked in the IWA for six months before joining the Philadelphia-based Combat Zone Wrestling. Not long after that, he joined Ring of Honor (ROH).

=== Ring of Honor (2003–2006) ===
==== Generation Next (2003–2004) ====
Shelley debuted in Ring of Honor on June 28, 2003, at WrestleRave 2003, facing B. J. Whitmer, Tony Mamaluke and Jimmy Jacobs in a Four Corners Survival match, which was won by Whitmer. He appeared with ROH sporadically throughout the remainder of 2003 and early 2004, feuding with Jimmy Jacobs and Matt Stryker.

At Generation Next on May 22, 2004, Shelley formed a stable, "Generation Next", with Austin Aries, Jack Evans and Roderick Strong. Generation Next, led by Shelley, spent the entirety of the event attacking other wrestlers, claiming that they were "the best that Ring of Honor has to offer". They began feuding with wrestlers with a respect for tradition such as Matt Stryker, Jimmy Rave and R. J. Brewer.

On July 17, 2004, at Reborn: Completion, Shelley lost to Doug Williams in the finals of a tournament for the vacant ROH Pure Championship. That same night, Generation Next attacked Ricky Steamboat during his confrontation with CM Punk, with Punk subsequently siding with Steamboat to fend off Generation Next. This led to a feud between Generation Next and the allies of Ricky Steamboat, culminating in a forty–five-minute-long eight–man elimination match at The Midnight Express Reunion on October 2, pitting Generation Next against CM Punk, John Walters, Jimmy Jacobs and Ace Steel. The match was won by Generation Next, with Shelley and Aries surviving. Following the match, Shelley announced his intention of challenging Samoa Joe for the ROH World Championship. Aries then announced he too was going after the title, with Shelley telling him to "remember where your loyalties lie".

On December 26, 2004, at Final Battle 2004, Shelley and Strong were defeated by CM Punk and Steve Corino. Following the match, Aries, feeling that Shelley was spending far too much time in Total Nonstop Action Wrestling (TNA) than he was leading Generation Next, came to the ring and demanded that Shelley step–down as the leader. Before Shelley could give an answer, he was attacked by Aries and Strong and kicked out of Generation Next, turning him into a fan favorite in the process.

==== The Embassy (2005–2006) ====
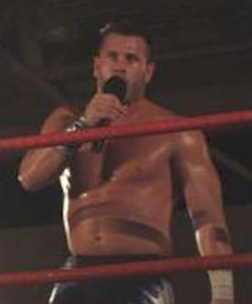
Shelley in the ring at a PWG show in 2006

Shelley feuded with Generation Next throughout early 2005, unsuccessfully challenging Aries for the ROH World Championship at Manhattan Mayhem on May 7. On July 23, Shelley was in a tag match against Aries and Strong, with him choosing a mystery partner. Shelley gave speculation in a backstage promo as to who his partner would be, saying it could be a new wrestler making their debut in Ring of Honor. He later revealed that he did not bring someone in to ROH, but had joined "The Embassy", a heel stable controlled by Prince Nana. Teaming with Fast Eddie Vegas that night, The Embassy won their first match in a feud with Generation Next that would last for the remainder of the year. The feud culminated in an eight–man elimination steel cage match on December 3, with Austin Aries, Roderick Strong, Jack Evans and Matt Sydal of Generation Next defeating Shelley, Jimmy Rave, Abyss and Nana of The Embassy.

At Hell Freezes Over on January 14, 2006, Shelley teamed up with Rave to defeat the duo of Claudio Castagnoli and Azrieal. Later that evening, Prince Nana offered to buy the ROH World Championship from Bryan Danielson after his successful defense against Chris Hero. When Danielson refused to sell it, he was attacked by The Embassy with Shelley giving him a Sliced Bread #2 claiming it was his "Kryptonite" as Danielson's long–time rival and former Embassy member, Spanky, utilized the move to defeat him on numerous occasions. The following show, The Embassy of Shelley, Rave and Abyss won the 2006 Trios Tournament defeating Generation Next of Jack Evans and Matt Sydal and their partner Jimmy Yang in the finals, and thus each wrestler was granted any match they wanted, with Shelley and Rave both announcing they wanted a shot at the ROH World Championship. Shelley was originally scheduled to face Danielson for the title on February 11, but a severe snowstorm hit the Northeast and Shelley was told by Total Nonstop Action Wrestling to fly back early to Orlando, Florida, so he would not miss their pay-per-view the following day. Shelley would eventually get his title shot one month later at Arena Warfare, but was unable to defeat Danielson.

Shelley would then wrestle sporadically in ROH for the next few months before quietly leaving in June. His last appearance as a regular in Ring of Honor took place on June 24 when he managed Jimmy Rave and Conrad Kennedy III in a losing effort against the Briscoe Brothers.

=== Total Nonstop Action Wrestling (2004–2012) ===
==== Goldy Locks; X Division (2004–2005) ====
Shelley signed a non–exclusive contract with Total Nonstop Action Wrestling on July 8, 2004. He was paired with Goldy Locks and dubbed "Baby Bear" Alex Shelley. Shelley requested his release from TNA late that year after booker Dusty Rhodes stopped utilizing him.

Shelley signed a new contract with TNA in 2005 after Rhodes resigned as TNA booker, and returned on June 19, 2005, at Slammiversary, losing to Shocker. He went on to form a tag team with Michael Shane, with the duo losing to America's Most Wanted at No Surrender 2005 on July 17. Shelley entered the TNA 2005 Super X Cup Tournament, but lost to Samoa Joe in the semifinals on August 7. He then entered the Chris Candido Memorial Tag Team Tournament with Sean Waltman as his tag team partner, and won the tournament by defeating Shocker and Chris Sabin in the finals on the September 9 episode of TNA Impact!. As a result of their victory, Waltman and Shelley were granted a shot at the NWA World Tag Team Championship in a four–way tag team bout at Unbreakable on September 11. After Waltman no-showed the event, Shelley was left without a partner, but opted to wrestle alone. He was doubled teamed by Team Canada (Eric Young and A-1) for much of the match until Johnny Candido, the brother of Chris Candido, climbed onto the apron and accepted Shelley's tag. However, Candido was pinned by Young shortly thereafter, with Shelley being eliminated from the match as a result.

Throughout late–2005, Shelley wrestled in the X Division as a villain, facing Austin Aries on several occasions. In November 2005, he introduced a gimmick that saw him bring a camcorder (the "Shelley–cam") to ringside in order to film matches to study later for strategic purposes (in reality, Shelley owned over 200 professional wrestling videotapes at the time). In late 2005, he began teaming with his former Generation Next teammates Austin Aries and Roderick Strong, feuding with established X Division fan favorites, Sonjay Dutt, Chris Sabin, and Matt Bentley and demanding bigger roles in the company from road agent Jerry Lynn which led to a series of matches in which the re–formed Generation Next came out on top.

==== Paparazzi Productions (2006–2007) ====
In early 2006, after both Aries and Strong were suspended by TNA, Shelley was recruited by Jeff Jarrett to obtain candid video footage of Jackie Gayda for the purposes of blackmail. Shelley went on to create the fictional enterprise "Paparazzi Productions" and obtain footage of Sting, Christian Cage and their respective families for the purposes of intimidation. Throughout April and May 2006, Shelley wrestled in the 2006 World X Cup Tournament as a member of the victorious Team USA. In May whilst the World X Cup was in progress, he interviewed Kevin Nash, during which Nash announced that the X Division was mere filler, and that intended to destroy the X Division. Shelley's lack of defense for the division created friction between his team mates and himself, with Shelley ultimately aligning himself with Nash after the tournament's end.

Shelley at a TNA house show in January 2009

Nash and Shelley made several well–received comedy vignettes (some exclusive to YouTube) mostly focusing on their feud with Chris Sabin. At Slammiversary, Shelley helped Nash defeat Sabin. Earlier Shelley had been ranked fifth in the X Division after being the second person eliminated in a six–man contender's match. In a post–match interview with Nash, Shelley claimed there was "ten guys, twenty guys – some of them had knives. I think I spotted a couple gats... guns". On July 16, 2006, Shelley teamed with Nash to face Chris Sabin and Jay Lethal in a losing effort.

At Hard Justice, Shelley replaced Nash in a match for the number one contendership of the X Division Championship. Shelley and Devine moved into the tag team division until they lost a Triple Chance Tag Team Battle Royal at No Surrender. Shelley also appeared in Kevin Nash's Open Invitational X Division Battle Royal at Bound for Glory on October 22, 2006. He lost the match to Austin Starr.

On the June 29, 2006, Impact!, Shelley recruited former Team Canada member Johnny Devine as a production assistant of Paparazzi Productions. Devine was later fired by the Paparazzi. Devine was replaced much to the dismay of Shelley by former Generation Next team mate Austin Starr due to Kevin Nash's wishes. Since this, the three were seen backstage on various episodes of Impact! in a tournament known as the Paparazzi Championship Series, which he won at Final Resolution.

Afterwards, he would tape two storyline attacks by The Latin American Xchange (LAX). One on Brother Rays uncle, another on Johnny Rodz. When he showed the footage of the LAX beatdown on Rodz, he was confronted by Brother Ray. Before a fight could breakout, the LAX attempted to attack Brother Ray. When it seemed Ray had the upper hand, however, Kevin Nash distracted him, allowing Shelley to hit him with a low blow. At Destination X 2007 Shelley helped LAX win the match by hitting Brother Devon with a video camera and giving him a Frog Splash through a table.

Shelley lost in the five–man Xscape match at Lockdown 2007. He was pinned by Jay Lethal. Later, Jay Lethal and Chris Sabin were the remaining two and Sabin escaped, retaining the X Division Championship.

==== Motor City Machine Guns (2007–2012) ====
During the summer of 2007, Shelley began wrestling as a tag team in TNA with Chris Sabin. The two had been teaming in several independent promotions under the names Murder City Machine Guns and The Motor City Machine Guns, both names being a play off of one of Shelley's former tag teams, "The Sexy Time Machine Guns" and the fact that both Sabin and Shelley hail from Detroit, Michigan.

In October 2007, Shelley and Sabin started a feud with Team 3D, during which Team 3D declared a war on the entire X Division and was looking to kill it off. After months of feuding, Shelley and Sabin along with Jay Lethal were able to defeat Team 3D and Johnny Devine in a Street Fight at Against All Odds to save the X Division and to end the feud. With the win, Team 3D were forced to drop their weights under 275 pounds if they wanted to keep on wrestling for the company. Shelley then fought for Team TNA in the World X Cup alongside Kaz, the team captain, his tag team partner Chris Sabin, and Curry Man. On June 19, in the first round of the tournament, Shelley and Sabin defeated Daivari and Tyson Dux of Team International to give Team TNA their first point. In the finals of the tournament, held at Victory Road, Shelley, Sabin and Curry Man represented Team TNA in the twelve–man, four–team elimination tag team match. Shelley made it to the end of the match and finally pinned Masato Yoshino of Team Japan to win the match and give Team TNA the lead ahead of the final round of the tournament, an Ultimate X match contested between the team captains. Despite Shelley's efforts, Team TNA was defeated in the final round by Team Mexico, who won the 2008 World X Cup. A month later, on July 25, 2008, Shelley and five other TNA wrestlers traveled to Mexico to compete in the Consejo Mundial de Lucha Libre International Grand Prix, contested in a sixteen–man torneo cibernetico match. In the end, Shelley managed to avenge Team TNA's loss in the World X Cup, by winning the Gran Prix, after pinning Último Guerrero. This led to a match on September 19 at CMLL's 75th Anniversary Show, where Shelley, Sabin and Sonjay Dutt unsuccessfully challenged Guerrero, Atlantis and Negro Casas for the CMLL World Trios Championship. After the tournaments Shelley and Sabin slipped into the role of tweeners, showing disrespect to Christian Cage, A.J. Styles, Consequences Creed, B.G. James and The Latin American Xchange however still being cheered heavily by the fans towards whom they did show respect.

Shelley at Bound for Glory IV in October 2008

On the October 30, 2008, Impact!, Shelley, Samoa Joe, A.J. Styles, Jay Lethal, Consequences Creed, Petey Williams, Eric Young, ODB and Chris Sabin formed a faction knows as The Frontline to battle The Main Event Mafia of Kurt Angle, Sting, Kevin Nash, Booker T and Scott Steiner. Despite their alliance Shelley and Sabin showed disrespect to both their stablemates and the TNA executive shareholder Mick Foley.

On the November 27, 2008, Impact!, Shelley took part in the second annual Turkey Bowl, defeating Cute Kip and Consequences Creed in a three–way dance in the semifinals. In the finals Shelley faced the reigning X Division Champion Sheik Abdul Bashir and Rhino in another three–way dance where the winner would receive a check for $25,000, and the loser had to wear a turkey suit. Rhino won the match, pinning Shelley following a Gore forcing him to wear the suit. Shelley finally agreed to put on the suit after Mick Foley threatened to fire him if he did not. After putting on the turkey suit Shelley gave Foley a middle finger and was laid out with a double arm DDT.

At Final Resolution in December 2008, Shelley and Sabin competed in the Feast or Fired match, but did not win a title contract.

During December 2008 and January 2009, Shelley qualified for the finals in the X Division title tournament after defeating Jay Lethal and Eric Young. At Genesis, he defeated his tag team partner Chris Sabin for his first reign as the X Division Champion. At Destination X in March 2009, he lost the title to Suicide in an Ultimate X match, which included Jay Lethal, Consequences Creed, and Chris Sabin. At Slammiversary Shelley, Sabin, Lethal, Creed and Suicide competed in the first ever X Division Title King of the Mountain match, in which Shelley was unsuccessful in regaining the title.

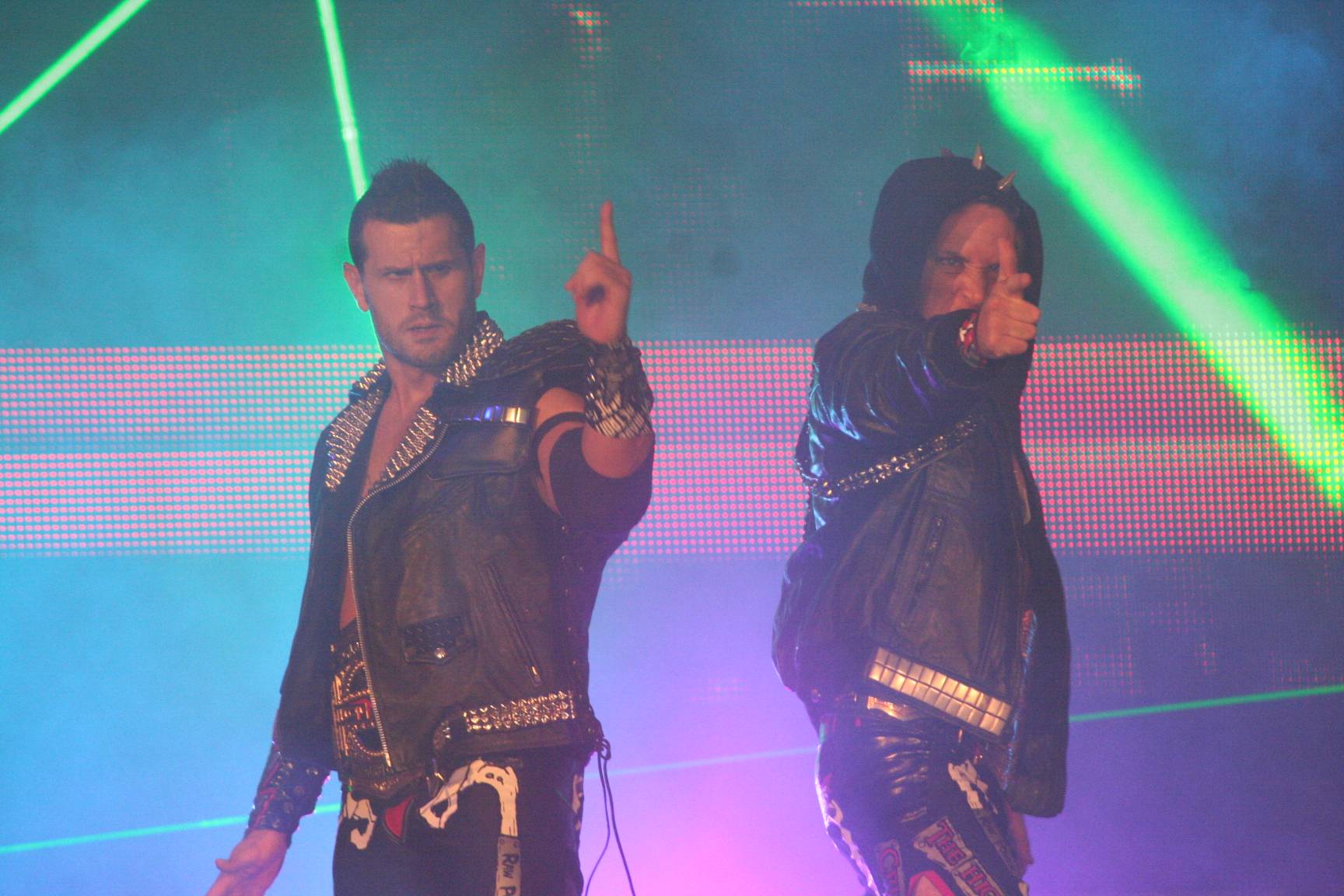
Shelley (left) and Sabin in July 2010

After Slammiversary Shelley and Sabin went inactive, barely making television appearances. In making a comeback on the July 30 Impact! they could be seen in the crowd holding signs that read, "Conspiracy Victims" and "Yes, We Still Work Here". On August 6 the duo interrupted Daniels' backstage interview before his match with World Elite leader Eric Young and agreed to accompany him to the ring in order to get some TV time. Later that night, after being attacked by Sheik Abdul Bashir and Kiyoshi of World Elite, Shelley and Sabin aligned themselves with Daniels and other fan favorites in a brawl with the alliance of World Elite and Main Event Mafia, which made them fan favorites again. During September Shelley and Sabin began appearing as occasional commentators alongside Mike Tenay and Taz on Impact! broadcasts. In late 2009, Shelley and Sabin gained two shots at the TNA World Tag Team Championship, but were both times defeated by the Champions British Invasion (Doug Williams and Brutus Magnus), first at Turning Point in a three–way match, which also included Beer Money, Inc. (Robert Roode and James Storm) and then in a regular tag team match at Final Resolution. At Destination X Shelley and Sabin defeated Generation Me (Jeremy Buck and Max Buck) in an Ultimate X match to earn another shot at the TNA World Tag Team Championship. Shelley and Sabin received their title shot on the April 12 Impact!, but were defeated by World Tag Team Champion Matt Morgan and Amazing Red, who replaced the injured Hernandez in the match.

Shelley in October 2010, posing with a TNA World Tag Team Championship belt

The following month at Sacrifice the Motor City Machine Guns defeated Beer Money, Inc. and Team 3D in a three–way match to earn another shot at the Tag Team Championship. On July 11 at Victory Road the Motor City Machine Guns defeated Beer Money, Inc. to win the vacant TNA World Tag Team Championship for the first time. After Victory Road the Motor City Machine Guns entered a Best of Five Series with Beer Money, Inc., contested for the TNA World Tag Team Championship. Beer Money won the first two matches, a ladder match and a Street Fight, after knocking their opponents out with beer bottles. However, Shelley and Sabin came back to win the two following matches, a steel cage match and an Ultimate X match, to even the score to 2–2 and set up a deciding match for the August 12 Impact!. On the August 12 Impact! the Motor City Machine Guns defeated Beer Money, Inc. in a Two Out of Three Falls match to win the Best of Five Series and retain the TNA World Tag Team Championship. The following month at No Surrender, the Motor City Machine Guns retained their titles in a match against Generation Me. After the match Generation Me turned heel by attacking the Machine Guns and injuring Shelley in storyline. On the following Impact!, Generation Me laid claim to the TNA World Tag Team Championship, claiming that the champions would not be able to defend them for 30 days, due to Shelley's injury, before stealing Sabin's title belt. Shelley would however make his return two weeks later and promised Generation Me a rematch for the World Tag Team Championship at Bound for Glory. At the pay–per–view the Motor City Machine Guns defeated Generation Me to retain the TNA World Tag Team Championship. Also at Bound for Glory, Team 3D announced their retirement from professional wrestling, but requested one final match against the Motor City Machine Guns, whom they called the best tag team in wrestling. The Motor City Machine Guns accepted and the match took place on November 7, 2010, at Turning Point, where they defeated Team 3D to retain the TNA World Tag Team Championship. After Jeremy Buck pinned Sabin in an eight-person tag team match, where the Motor City Machine Guns teamed with Jay Lethal and Velvet Sky and Generation Me with Robbie E and Cookie, on the November 18 Impact!, the Motor City Machine Guns challenged Generation Me to an Empty Arena match. The match took place later that same night on Reaction with the Motor City Machine Guns coming out victorious. On December 5 at Final Resolution the Motor City Machine Guns defeated Generation Me in a Full Metal Mayhem match to retain the World Tag Team Championship. The following month at Genesis, Shelley and Sabin lost the World Tag Team Championship to Beer Money, Inc., after Roode rolled up Sabin, following a miscommunication between the Machine Guns. Shelley and Sabin received their rematch for the title on the following Impact!, but lost again due to a miscommunication. On January 16 Shelley broke his collarbone during a match in Hagerstown, Maryland. Originally, Shelley was advertised to make his return on April 17 at Lockdown in a nine-man Xscape match, but on April 7 he was removed from the match and his return postponed. Shelley made his return on April 20 at the tapings of the April 28 Impact!, saving Sabin from Mexican America (Anarquia and Hernandez). Ironically, the same day Shelley made his return, Sabin suffered a knee injury in his match with Anarquia. Later that same week, Sabin underwent knee surgery, which would sideline him for the rest of the year.

Shelley replacing Bobby Roode at Slammiversary IX

On the June 2 Impact Wrestling, Shelley formed an alliance with former rivals Beer Money, Inc., who were looking for a partner to replace the injured Bobby Roode in their World Tag Team Championship defense against the British Invasion at Slammiversary IX. At the pay-per-view, Shelley and Storm were successful in their title defense. At Destination X, Shelley defeated Amazing Red, Robbie E and Shannon Moore in an Ultimate X match to become the number one contender to the TNA X Division Championship. Shelley received his shot at the X Division Championship, held by Brian Kendrick, on the July 21 Impact Wrestling, but was defeated following outside interference from Austin Aries. Two weeks later, Aries defeated Shelley in a singles match. On August 7 at Hardcore Justice, Shelley and Aries competed in a three-way match for the TNA X Division Championship, but were both unable to win the belt from the defending champion, Brian Kendrick. After a four-month absence, Shelley returned on the January 19, 2012, Impact Wrestling, confronting and challenging X Division Champion Austin Aries. The following week, Shelley defeated Zema Ion to become the number one contender to Aries' title. On February 12 at Against All Odds, Shelley was unsuccessful in his title challenge against Aries, after submitting to the Last Chancery.

On March 18 at Victory Road, TNA started promoting the returns of Chris Sabin and the Motor City Machine Guns. Sabin returned on the April 5 Impact Wrestling, where he and Shelley defeated Mexican America in a tag team match, before announcing their intention of going for the TNA World Tag Team Championship, held by Magnus and Samoa Joe. On April 15 at Lockdown, The Motor City Machine Guns unsuccessfully challenged Magnus and Joe for the TNA World Tag Team Championship in a steel cage match. During the next month, The Motor City Machine Guns did not make another appearance on Impact Wrestling, instead wrestling exclusively on TNA house shows. On May 21, it was reported that Shelley had chosen not to renew his contract with TNA, ending his eight-year run with the promotion. On May 29, Shelley was removed from the official TNA roster page, confirming his departure from the promotion.

=== Pro Wrestling Zero-1 Max (2005–2008) ===
In March 2005, Shelley joined Pro Wrestling Zero1-Max. He won the vacant Zero1-Max United States Openweight Championship on September 19, 2005, in Tokyo, Japan, defeating Sonjay Dutt. His reign lasted until November 23 of that year, when he lost the title to Christopher Daniels.

On August 25, 2006, at Korakuen Hall's Zero-1 Max show, Shelley and Chris Sabin became NWA International Lightweight Tag Team Champions, when they defeated champions, Ikuto Hidaka and Minoru Fujita. They lost the titles to the team of Minoru Fujita and Takuya Sugawara on April 6, 2008.

=== Return to ROH (2007–2008) ===
Shelley returned to ROH along with Chris Sabin on March 30, 2007, following the Briscoe Brothers winning the ROH World Tag Team Championship. The two challenged Jay Briscoe for a shot at the title on April 28 in Chicago, then attacked him after he accepted. The two would ultimately lose the match and leave the company.

In April 2008, Shelley and Sabin returned to ROH, losing to The Age of the Fall (Jimmy Jacobs and Tyler Black) and defeating the Briscoe Brothers (Jay and Mark) on the 18 and 19 respectively.

In August 2008, Shelley and Sabin once again returned to ROH, wrestling Austin Aries and Bryan Danielson to a 25-minute time limit draw and losing to Kevin Steen and El Generico on the 1st and 2nd respectively. Shelley and Sabin were scheduled to return to ROH on October 24 and 25, but were pulled from the events by TNA and replaced by The Latin American Xchange.

=== New Japan Pro-Wrestling (2009–2010) ===
On January 4, 2009, Shelley and Sabin defeated No Limit (Tetsuya Naito and Yujiro) at New Japan Pro-Wrestling's Wrestle Kingdom III in Tokyo Dome to win the IWGP Junior Heavyweight Tag Team Championship. They followed in the footsteps of American Dragon and Curry Man as the only other gaijin team to win those titles. After three successful title defenses, two of which took place in TNA, Shelley and Sabin lost the IWGP Junior Heavyweight Tag Team Title to Apollo 55 (Prince Devitt and Ryusuke Taguchi) on July 5, 2009, at NJPW's Circuit 2009 New Japan Soul. On November 8, 2010, NJPW announced that the Motor City Machine Guns would be returning to the promotion the following month, competing at events on December 11 and 12. On December 11 the Motor City Machine Guns were defeated by No Limit in their New Japan return match. The following day they defeated Apollo 55 in the fourth ever match between the two teams.

=== Second return to ROH (2010) ===
On February 13, 2010, Ring of Honor announced at their 8th Anniversary Show that the Motor City Machine Guns would return to the company on May 8 in New York City. On May 8 the Motor City Machine Guns were defeated by the ROH World Tag Team Champions The Kings of Wrestling (Chris Hero and Claudio Castagnoli) via disqualification, when the Briscoe Brothers interfered in the match.

=== Return to NJPW (2012–2015) ===
Following his departure from TNA, New Japan announced on August 13, 2012, that Shelley would be returning to the promotion the following month. Before Shelley's return to Japan, he and A.J. Kirsch unsuccessfully challenged Forever Hooligans (Alex Koslov and Rocky Romero) for the IWGP Junior Heavyweight Tag Team Championship on August 26 at a Sacramento Wrestling Federation (SWF) event in Gridley, California. Following the match, Kushida saved Shelley from a beatdown at the hands of Koslov and Romero. Shelley wrestled his New Japan return match on September 7, when he, Bushi, Máscara Dorada and Ryusuke Taguchi were defeated in an eight-man tag team match by Alex Koslov, Averno, Low Ki and Rocky Romero. Afterwards, Shelley continued teaming with Kushida with the two forming the tag team "Time Splitters" and scoring several wins over Koslov and Romero in multiple man teamed matches, after debuting their new double-team finishing maneuver, the I-94. On October 8 at King of Pro-Wrestling, Time Splitters unsuccessfully challenged Forever Hooligans for the IWGP Junior Heavyweight Tag Team Championship. On October 21, the Time Splitters entered the 2012 Super Jr. Tag Tournament, defeating Jado & Gedo in their first round match. On November 2, Shelley and Kushida defeated Suzuki-gun (Taichi and Taka Michinoku) to advance to the finals, where, later that same day, they defeated Apollo 55 to win the tournament and become the number one contenders to the IWGP Junior Heavyweight Tag Team Championship. On November 11 at Power Struggle, the Time Splitters defeated Forever Hooligans in a rematch to win the IWGP Junior Heavyweight Tag Team Championship. Time Splitters made their first successful title defense on February 10, 2013, at The New Beginning, defeating Forever Hooligans in the third title match between the two teams. Their second successful defense took place on March 3 at New Japan's 41st anniversary event, where they defeated Jyushin Thunder Liger and Tiger Mask. On April 5, Shelley received his first shot at the IWGP Junior Heavyweight Championship, but was defeated by the defending champion, Prince Devitt. Two days later at Invasion Attack, Time Splitters defeated Devitt and Ryusuke Taguchi for their third successful defense of the IWGP Junior Heavyweight Tag Team Championship. On May 3 at Wrestling Dontaku 2013, Time Splitters lost the IWGP Junior Heavyweight Tag Team Championship back to the Forever Hooligans in their fourth defense.

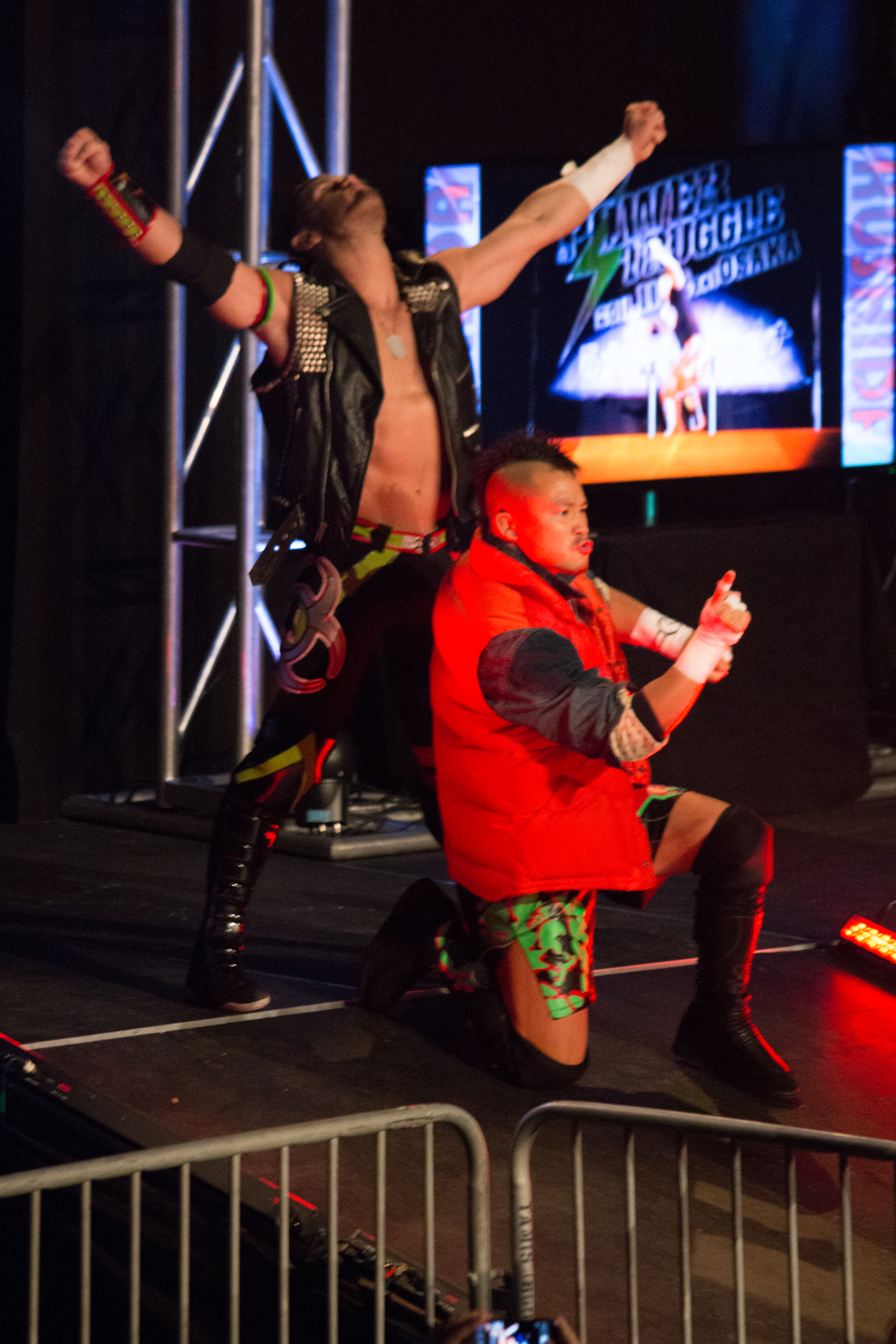
Shelley (back) and Kushida as the Time Splitters in May 2014

From late May to early June, Shelley took part in the 2013 Best of the Super Juniors, where he managed to win five out of his eight matches with a win over Ricochet in the final round-robin match of the tournament on June 6, earning him a spot in the semifinals. On June 9, after defeating Taka Michinoku in his semifinal match, Shelley was defeated in the finals of the tournament by Prince Devitt. On June 22 at Dominion 6.22, Time Splitters failed in their attempt to regain the IWGP Junior Heavyweight Tag Team Championship from the Forever Hooligans. On September 29 at Destruction, Shelley and Kushida defeated Suzuki-gun (Taichi and Taka Michinoku) to earn another shot at the Forever Hooligans and the IWGP Junior Heavyweight Tag Team Championship. However, on October 7, New Japan announced that Shelley had suffered a back injury, which would force Time Splitters to back out of the title match. Shelley later revealed that he had received a severe sciatica taking a sitout powerbomb from Taichi, which marked his fourth injury in the promotion since his September 2012 return. Shelley wrestled his return match on January 4, 2014, at Wrestle Kingdom 8 in Tokyo Dome, where he and Kushida unsuccessfully challenged The Young Bucks for the IWGP Junior Heavyweight Tag Team Championship in a four-way match, which also included the Forever Hooligans and Suzuki-gun. Time Splitters were victorious in a non-title rematch the following day, after which they asserted themselves as The Young Bucks' next challengers. They received their title shot on February 11 at The New Beginning in Osaka, but were again defeated by The Young Bucks. Time Splitters received another title shot on May 10 at Global Wars, a special event co-produced by NJPW and ROH in Toronto, but were defeated by The Young Bucks in a three-way match, also involving Forever Hooligans. On May 30, Shelley entered the 2014 Best of the Super Juniors tournament, where he won his block with a record of four wins and three losses, advancing to the semifinals. However, after injuring his left shoulder in his final round-robin match on June 6, Shelley was forced to pull out of the semifinals.

Shelley returned to the ring on June 21 at Dominion 6.21, where he and Kushida defeated The Young Bucks to win the IWGP Junior Heavyweight Tag Team Championship for the second time as a team. On August 10, Time Splitters made their first successful defense of the IWGP Junior Heavyweight Tag Team Championship against the ROH tag team reDRagon. Time Splitters made their second successful title defense on September 23 against Suzuki-gun (El Desperado and Taichi). On October 13 at King of Pro-Wrestling, Time Splitters made their third successful title defense in a three-way match against Forever Hooligans and The Young Bucks. On November 8 at Power Struggle, Time Splitters lost the title to 2014 Super Jr. Tag Tournament winners reDRagon. Time Splitters received a rematch for the IWGP Junior Heavyweight Tag Team Championship on January 4, 2015, at Wrestle Kingdom 9 in Tokyo Dome, in a four-way match also involving Forever Hooligans and The Young Bucks, but were again defeated by reDRagon. On February 11 at The New Beginning in Osaka, Time Splitters received another title shot in a three-way match, but were this time defeated by The Young Bucks, who became the new champions. On May 3 at Wrestling Dontaku 2015, Shelley unsuccessfully challenged Kenny Omega for the IWGP Junior Heavyweight Championship. Later that month, Shelley suffered ligament damage and an avulsion fracture in his left foot, which forced him to pull out of the 2015 Best of the Super Juniors. Shelley returned to New Japan ring in September and on September 27 at Destruction in Kobe, he and Kushida unsuccessfully challenged reDRagon for the IWGP Junior Heavyweight Tag Team Championship. Following the 2015 Super Jr. Tag Tournament in November, Shelley left Japan.

=== Third return to ROH (2014–2019) ===
Shelley returned to ROH on December 7, 2014, at Final Battle 2014, where he and Kushida unsuccessfully challenged reDRagon (Bobby Fish and Kyle O'Reilly) for the ROH World Tag Team Championship. The Time Splitters returned to ROH on August 22, 2015, losing to the Briscoes at Field of Honor.

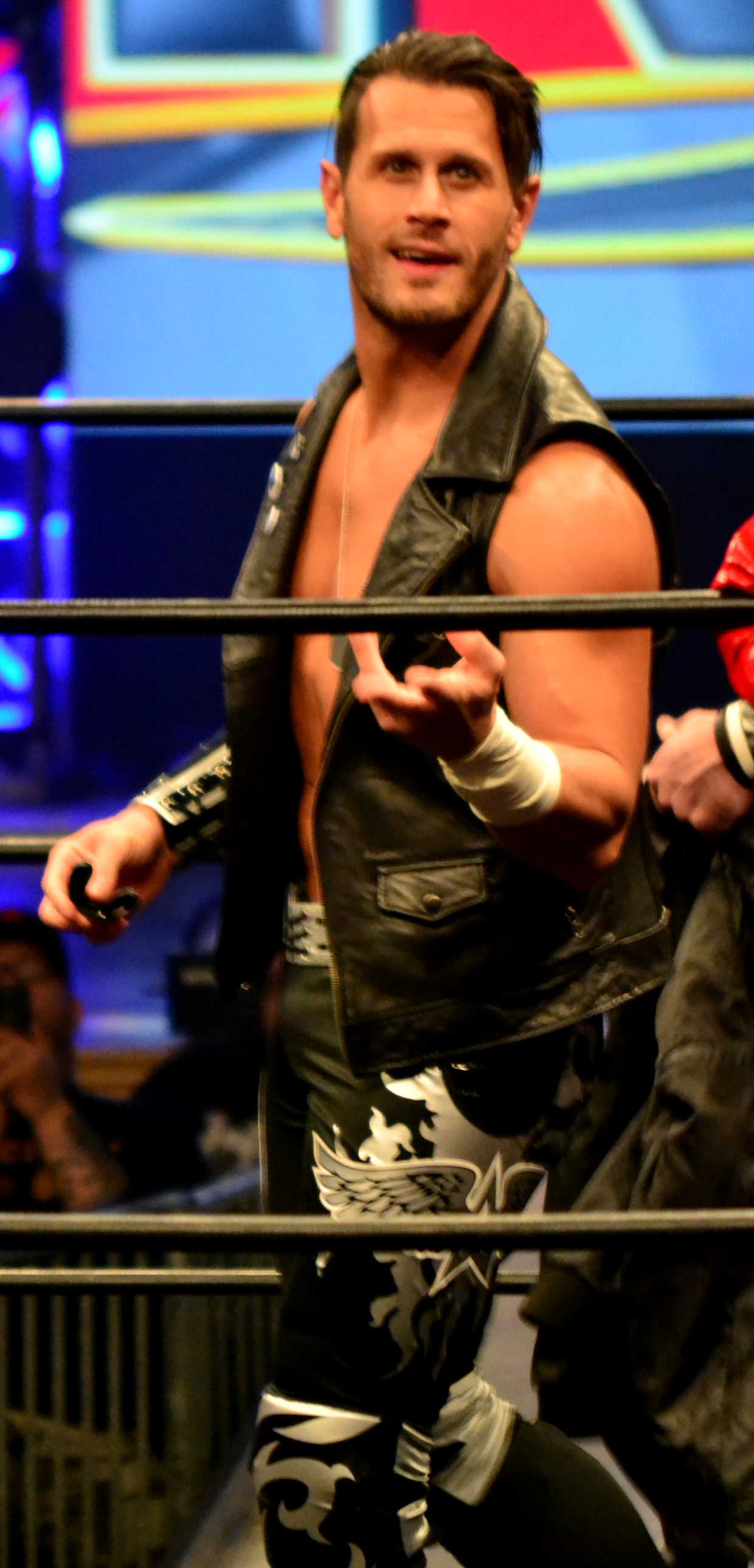
Shelley in February 2016

On November 20, 2015, Shelley returned to ROH, revealing himself as the mystery man who had been interfering in The Addiction's (Christopher Daniels and Frankie Kazarian) matches, wearing a mask associated with KRD, a stable made up of The Addiction and Shelley's former tag team partner Chris Sabin. On December 18 at Final Battle, Shelley teamed with A. C. H. and Matt Sydal to defeat Sabin, Daniels and Kazarian in a six-man tag team match. On February 26, 2016, at the 14th Anniversary Show, Sabin turned on Daniels and Kazarian, re-forming the Motor City Machine Guns with Shelley. At the following day's Ring of Honor Wrestling tapings, Shelley and Sabin defeated Daniels and Kazarian in their return match. On May 16, Shelley confirmed he had signed with ROH and would work for the promotion regularly going forward. On June 24 at Best in the World '16, The Motor City Machine Guns unsuccessfully challenged The Addiction for the ROH World Tag Team Championship. On September 30 at All Star Extravaganza VIII, The Motor City Machine Guns took part in a three-way ladder match for the ROH World Tag Team Championship, which was won by The Young Bucks (Matt Jackson and Nick Jackson) and also included The Addiction.

Shelley and Sabin then formed a stable named "Search and Destroy" with Jay White, Jonathan Gresham and Lio Rush.

On September 22, 2017, at Death Before Dishonor XV, the Motor City Machine Guns defeated The Young Bucks to win the ROH World Tag Team Championship for the first time. They would retain the titles until March 9, 2018, when they lost them against The Briscoe Brothers at ROH 16th Anniversary Show.

In June 2018, Shelley suffered an injury. On July 20, 2018, it was reported his contract with ROH expired and left the promotion to focus on his wrestling school. Four days after, Shelley announced his kayfabe retirement; in reality, Shelley started his clinicals for physical therapy school and devoted his time to prepare for his post-in-ring career.

On June 30, 2019, Shelley returned to ROH and announced he wants a match with the winner of Manhattan Mayhem, hinting that he might come out of retirement. On July 21, Shelley came out of retirement to team up with Jay Lethal and Jonathan Gresham to beat The Kingdom. On August 9, at Summer Supercard, Shelley was defeated by Matt Taven for the ROH World Championship. On December 13, 2019, At Final Battle, Shelley defeated Colt Cabana. At ROH Past vs Present, Shelley was set to reunite with his Generation Next stablemate Matt Sydal to face Villain Enterprises. However, due to the COVID-19 pandemic, the event was cancelled. Shelley's profile was then moved to the alumni section some time later.

=== Second return to NJPW (2016) ===
On July 31, 2016, NJPW announced that Shelley would return to the promotion on August 21, now again as part of the Motor City Machine Guns tag team with Chris Sabin. In their return match, The Motor City Machine Guns unsuccessfully challenged The Young Bucks for the IWGP Junior Heavyweight Tag Team Championship.

=== WWE (2020) ===
On the January 1, 2020, episode of NXT, the participants to the Dusty Rhodes Tag Team Classic were announced, with the exception of Kushida's partner, whose identity was kept a mystery. On January 8, a surprise announcement was made that Shelley was coming to WWE, as part of the NXT brand and would be Kushida's partner, reforming their Time Splitters tag team for the first time since their New Japan Pro Wrestling days in 2015; this is Shelley's first time performing on WWE, after a one-off appearance on WWE Heat back in his early wrestling days in 2005. On the January 15 episode of NXT, Shelley and Kushida lost to Grizzled Young Veterans (James Drake and Zack Gibson) in the first round of the tournament.

=== Return to Impact Wrestling (2020–2021) ===
At Slammiversary on July 18, 2020, Shelley made his return to TNA, now known as Impact Wrestling, alongside Chris Sabin as the Motor City Machine Guns defeating the Rascalz after answering their open challenge. On the following episode of Impact!, they defeated the North to capture the Impact World Tag Team Championship for a second time, ending their 383 days reign. Over the next few months, they would retain their titles against the Rascalz, and Ace Austin and Madman Fulton. At Bound for Glory, the Motor City Machine Guns lost their titles back to the North in a four-way tag team match also involving the Good Brothers and Austin and Fulton, ending their reign at 97 days. Before the match, Shelley was attacked by the North, leaving Sabin to defend the titles by himself.

Shelley would be taken out of action for a few months after Bound for Glory. They would return on the December 1 episode of Impact!, defeating XXXL (Acey Romero and Larry D). Shelley was scheduled to team up with Sabin and Rich Swann to face Kenny Omega and the Good Brothers at Hard To Kill, but he legitimately had to back out due to "unavoidable circumstances", and was thus replaced in the match by Moose. Shelley later revealed that his career outside of wrestling required him to step away from wrestling for the time being until he is able to get the COVID-19 vaccine. Later, in September 2021, Shelley announced that he left Impact.

=== Major League Wrestling (2021) ===
On October 2, 2021, Shelley made his MLW debut at Fightland where he lost to TJP in the Opera Cup quarter-finals.

=== Pro Wrestling Guerrilla (2021–2022) ===
September 26, 2021, at the "Threemendous VI" event, Shelley made his Pro Wrestling Guerrilla (PWG) debut, defeating Jonathan Gresham to become the number one contender for the PWG World Championship. Shelley unsuccessfully challenged Bandido for the PWG World Championship. On January 29, and 30, Shelley participated in the 2022 PWG Battle of Los Angeles. He defeated Lee Moriarty in the first round, but lost to Daniel Garcia in the second round.

=== Second return to Impact Wrestling/TNA (2022–2024) ===
At Sacrifice on March 5, 2022, Shelley returned to Impact Wrestling to face his student Jay White in a losing effort. At Multiverse of Matches on April 1, Shelley was defeated by Mike Bailey. On the July 21 episode of Impact!, Shelley defeated Sabin in an Impact World Championship number one contender match. On August 12 at Emergence, Shelley unsuccessfully challenged Josh Alexander for the Impact World Championship. On December 9, 2022, The Guns defeated Heath and Rhino to capture the Impact World Tag Team Championship for a third time, ending their 62 days reign. On the March 2, 2023, episode of Impact, the Motor City Machine Guns lost their titles to Bullet Club members Ace Austin and Chris Bey, ending their reign at 78 days.

On May 26, 2023, at Under Siege, Shelley defeated Eddie Edwards, Frankie Kazarian, Jonathan Gresham, Moose and Yuya Uemura to become the number one contender for Impact World Championship at Against All Odds. At the event on June 9, Shelley won the Impact World Championship after defeating Steve Maclin, winning the title for the first time in his career. On the June 23 episode of Impact!, he successfully defended his title against Brian Myers and against Maclin on the Impact Down Under Tour. On July 15 at Slammiversary, Shelley successfully defended his title against Nick Aldis. After the match, Shelley was confronted by the former Impact World Champion Josh Alexander. On August 8 at episode of Impact, Shelley defended his title against Brian Myers and against Hiroshi Tanahashi on August 20 at Multiverse United 2. In the following weeks, Shelley took exception to Alexander calling the Impact World Championship "his" title, since he was never beaten for it. The two would continue to be reluctant allies, however, Shelley would at points abandon Alexander whenever the latter was in trouble, such as at Emergence. On Week 2 of Impact 1000, Impact announced that Shelley would defend the Impact World Championship against Alexander at Bound for Glory, which Shelley won the match.

On November 9 at episode of Impact, Shelley successfully defended his title against Jonathan Gresham. On December 9 at Final Resolution, Shelley and Sabin were defeated by Alexander and Zack Sabre Jr. in a tag team match. On January 13, 2024 at Hard To Kill, Shelley lost the championship against Moose, ending his reign at 218 days. On February 23 at No Surrender, Shelley was unsuccessful at winning the TNA World Championship against Moose in a No Surrender Rules match. On the March 23, 2024 tapings for TNA Impact!, Shelley alongside Sabin wrestled their final matches for TNA in a losing effort against The System (Eddie Edwards and Brian Myers), as their contracts expired on April 1, 2024.

=== Third return to NJPW (2022–2023) ===
After defeating the Strong Openweight Tag Team Champions, Aussie Open on the September 15th episode of Impact!, Sabin and Shelley made their return to New Japan Pro-Wrestling at Rumble on 44th Street on October 28. At the event, the duo defeated Aussie Open to win the Strong Openweight Tag Team Championships, in a three-way match, also involving The DKC and Kevin Knight. The duo retained the titles in February at Battle in the Valley, defeating the West Coast Wrecking Crew (Royce Isaacs and Jorel Nelson). On April 15 at Capital Collision, the duo lost the titles back to Aussie Open in a three-way tag-team match also involving the team of Kazuchika Okada and Hiroshi Tanahashi. At Destruction In Ryōgoku, the duo teamed with Josh Alexander to unsuccessfully challeng Kazuchika Okada, Hiroshi Tanahashi, and Tomohiro Ishii for the NEVER Openweight 6-Man Tag Team Championship.

=== All Elite Wrestling (2022) ===
On the August 24, 2022, episode of AEW Dynamite, Sonjay Dutt announced that Jay Lethal would team with the Motor City Machine Guns at the All Out PPV, where they would take on Wardlow and FTR in a six-man tag-team match, with Sabin and Shelley set to make their All Elite Wrestling (AEW) debut. At the event, Wardlow and FTR would win the match, with assistance from Samoa Joe, who attacked Satnam Singh early in the match.

=== Return to WWE (2024–2026) ===
In September 2024, it was reported that Shelley and Sabin signed with WWE, marking Shelley's return to the company after four years, with his last appearance being a one-off deal in 2020. They made their debut on the SmackDown brand on October 18, winning the WWE Tag Team Championships next week after they defeated The Bloodline (Tonga Loa and Tama Tonga). On the November 15 episode of SmackDown, Shelley and Sabin defended the titles against The Street Profits (Angelo Dawkins and Montez Ford), but the match ended in a no contest after Ciampa attacked both teams. On the December 6 episode of SmackDown, Shelley and Sabin lost the titles to DIY after Johnny Gargano hit Sabin with a low blow, ending their reign at 42 days.

They attempted to regain the titles in a two-out-of-three falls match on February 1, 2025 at the Royal Rumble event, but were not successful due to interference from The Street Profits. On the April 25 episode of SmackDown, they would attempt to regain the titles in a tables, ladders, and chairs match, where the Street Profits won. At night two of SummerSlam on August 3, Shelley and Sabin competed in a six-pack tag team TLC match for the WWE Tag Team Championships against Fraxiom (Axiom & Nathan Frazer) Street Profits, Andrade & Rey Fénix, #DIY, and The Wyatt Sicks (Joe Gacy & Dexter Lumis), where the latter retained their titles.

Shelley and Sabin wrestled their final match in WWE on the April 17, 2026 episode of SmackDown as they both entered the André the Giant Memorial Battle Royal, but failed to win. A week later, it was reported that Shelley and Sabin were both released by WWE.

=== Return to AEW (2026–present) ===
Shelley in October 2026

Shelley and Sabin returned to AEW as signed talents during the opening of the July 30, 2026, episode of Collision, held in their hometown of Detroit. The appearance marked the duo's first time in the company in four years, following a one-off appearance in 2022. They wrestled their first match as AEW talents on the September 5 episode of Collision, defeating The Swirl (Blake Christian and Lee Johnson). In October, they began a best-of-five series against FTR (Cash Wheeler and Dax Harwood), with Shelley and Sabin winning the first match at WrestleDream on October 17. The two teams would trade victories for the second, third, and fourth matches which would tie the series at 2-2. Shelley and Sabin won the deciding match on the November 11 episode of Dynamite and became the number one contenders for the AEW World Tag Team Championship.

== Other media ==
Shelley has appeared in the video games TNA Impact!, TNA Wrestling Impact! and WWE 2K25 as part of the New Wave Pack (DLC).

== Personal life ==
Martin married in 2015. The couple divorced after 3 years of marriage in 2018.

Martin is a fan of punk rock. He has worn the logo of the band Teenage Bottlerocket on his ring attire and the band has talked about being in contact with him. Aside from wrestling, he was the lead singer of a rock band called The High Crusade, which includes Chris Sabin and Petey Williams. He is currently a vocalist for a rock band called GRPPLNG, which also includes Sabin.

Preparing for a career after his in-ring wrestling days are over, Martin is a physical therapy clinician. He stated that he wanted to pursue it because of a general lack of physical therapists in professional wrestling and wanting to help people. Following the expiration of his contract with ROH in 2018, Martin started a year-long clinical to become certified. His career as a clinician forced him to miss the Hard to Kill pay-per-view due to COVID-19 and focus on his main work.

== Championships and accomplishments ==
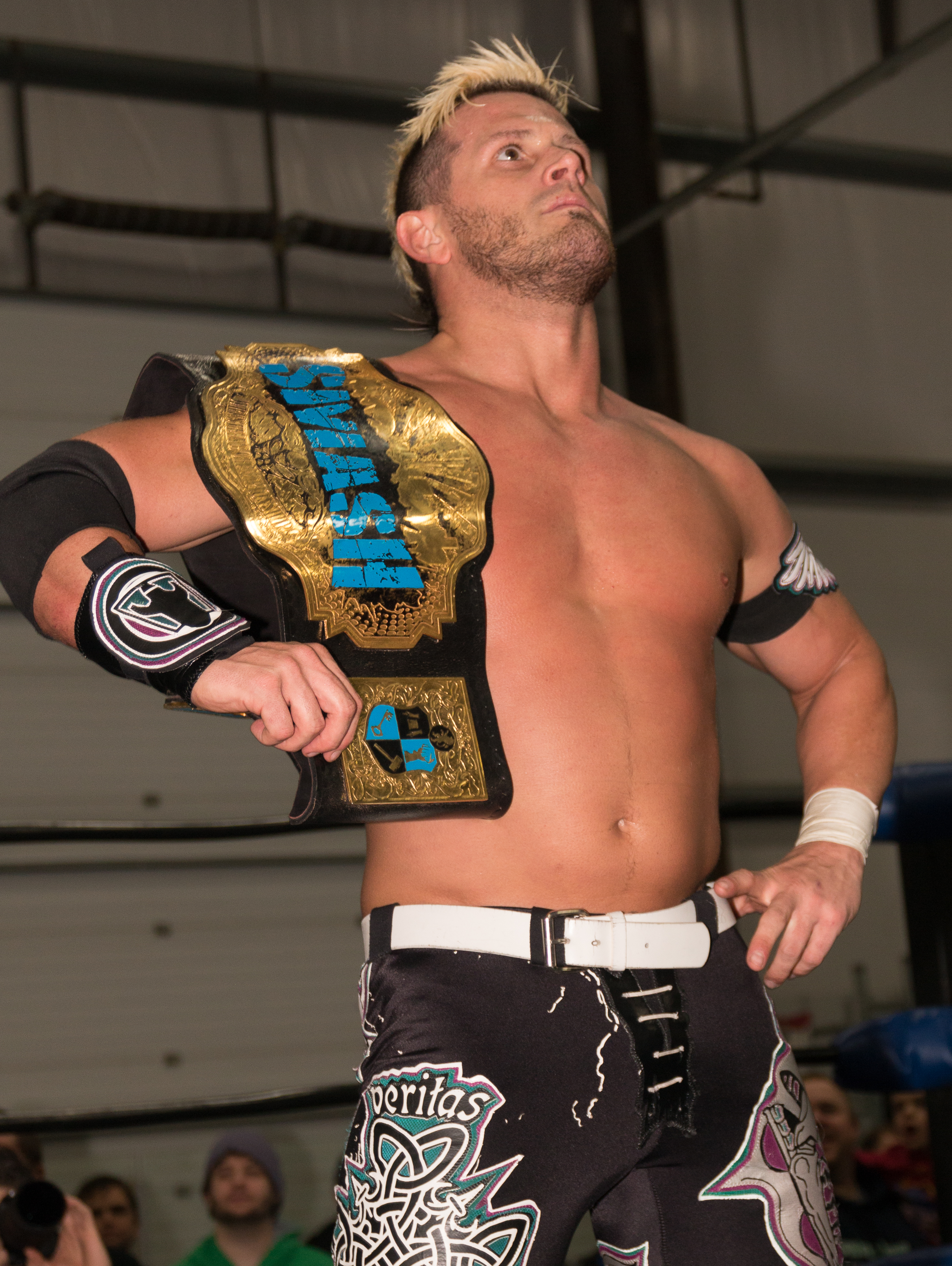
Shelley with the Smash Wrestling Championship belt

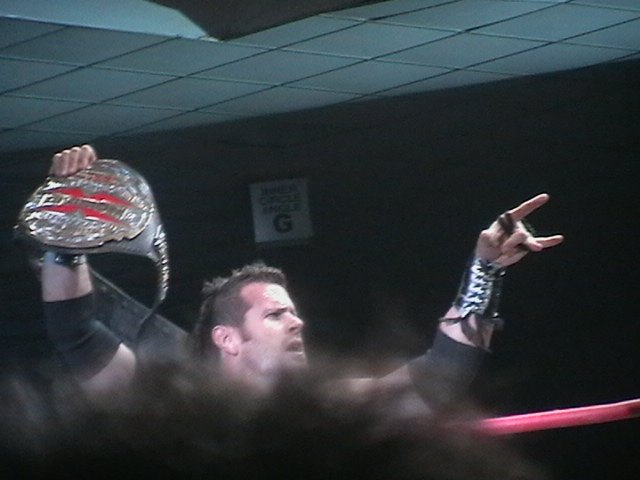
Shelley is a one-time TNA X Division Champion.

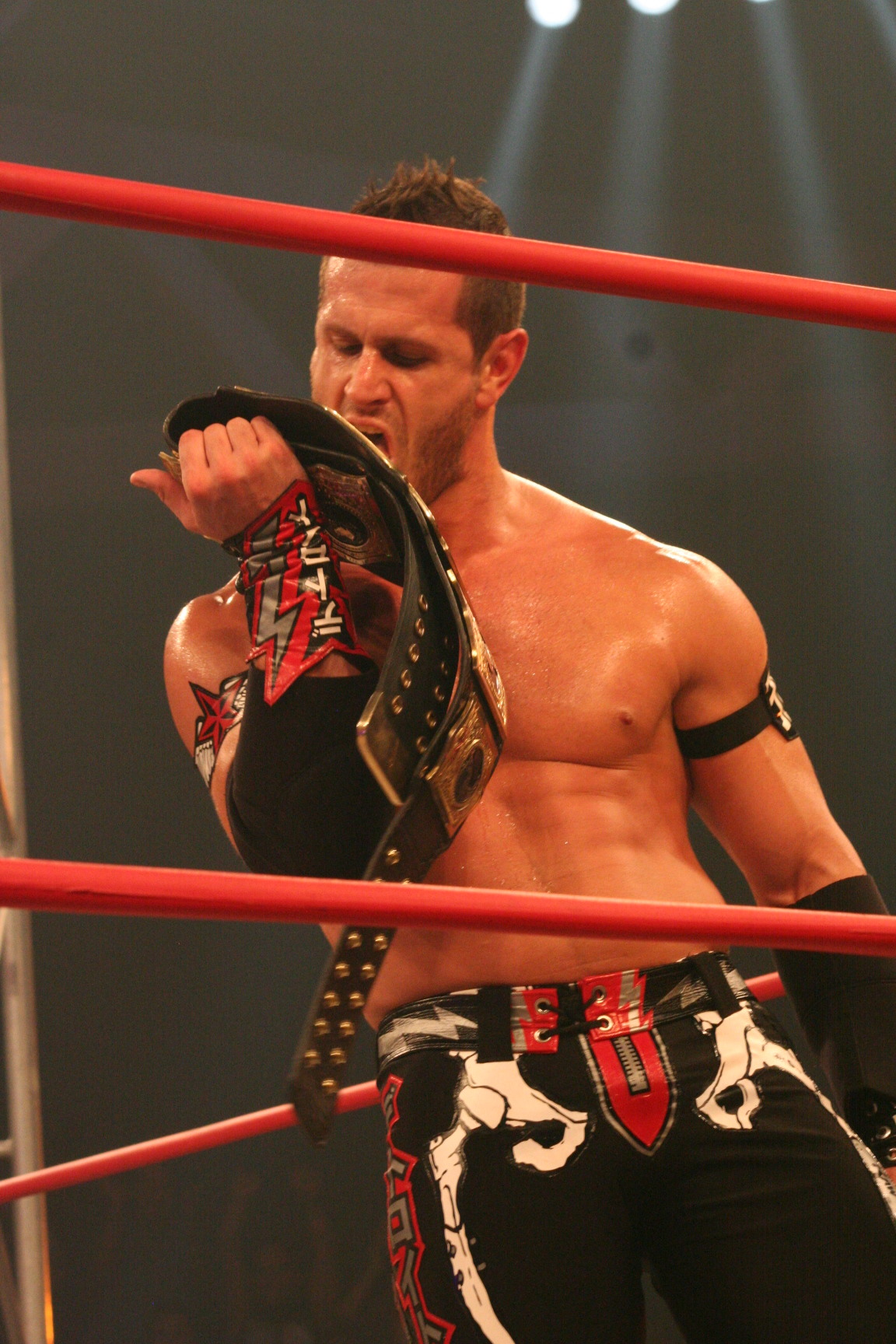
Shelley is a three-time TNA/Impact World Tag Team Champion with Chris Sabin.

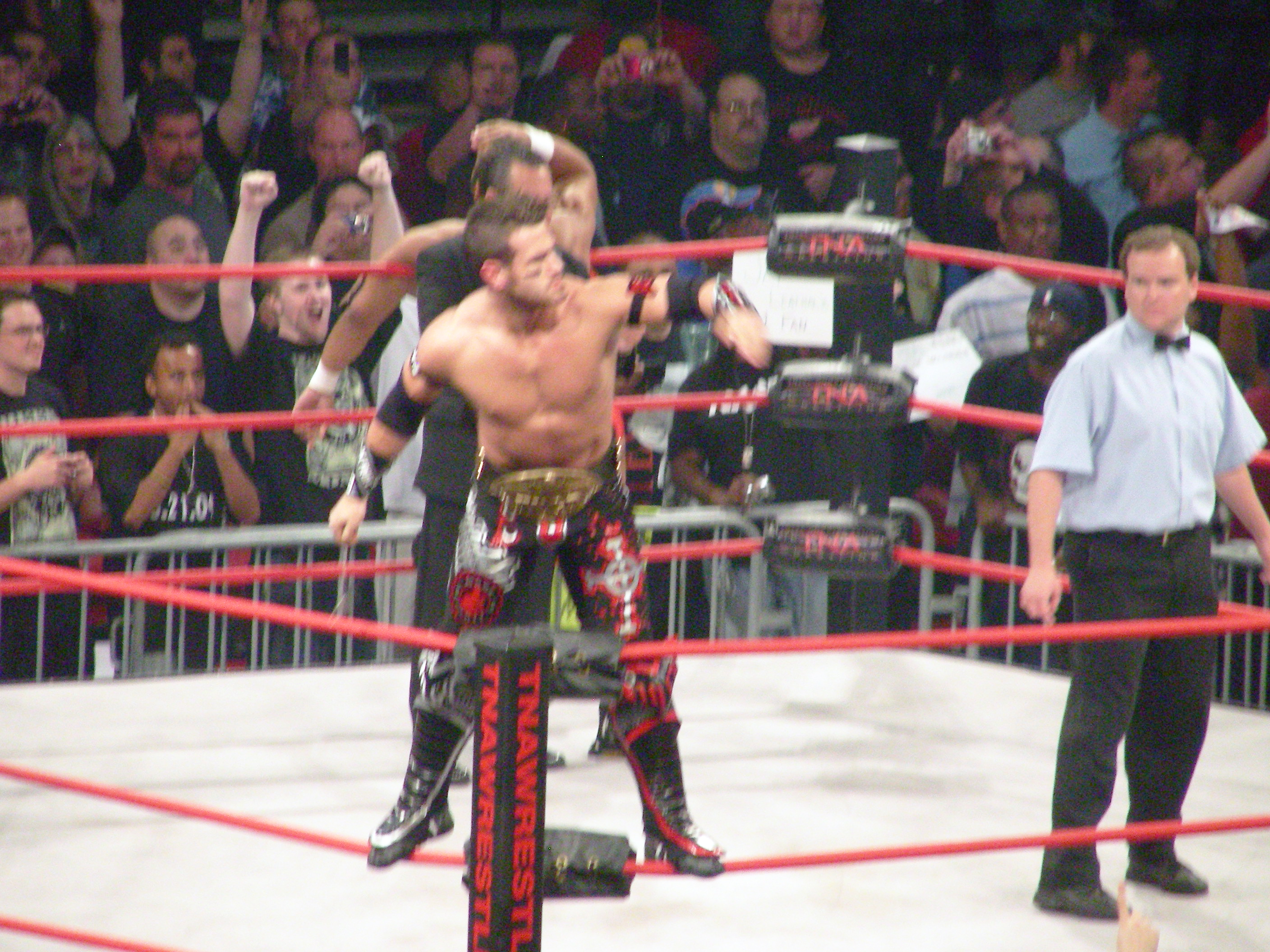
Shelley with an IWGP Junior Heavyweight Tag Team Championship belt at Slammiversary 2009

- ACTION Wrestling
  - ACTION Award for Match of the Year (2022) – Vs. AC Mack at "Southeast First"
- All American Wrestling
  - AAW Tag Team Championship (1 time) – with Chris Sabin
- The Baltimore Sun
  - Tag Team of the Year (2010) – with Chris Sabin
- Border City Wrestling
  - BCW Can-Am Television Championship (1 time)
- Black Label Pro
  - BLP Midwest Championship (1 time)
  - Turbo Graps 16 (2020)
- City Championship Wrestling
  - CCW Tag Team Championship (1 time) – with Chris Sabin
- Combat 1 Pro Wrestling
  - Combat 1 Crash Championship (1 time)
- Combat Zone Wrestling
  - CZW World Junior Heavyweight Championship (1 time)
- Consejo Mundial de Lucha Libre
  - International Gran Prix (2008)
- Deadlock Pro-Wrestling
  - DPW Worlds Tag Team Championship (1 time) – with Chris Sabin
- Game Changer Wrestling
  - GCW Tag Team Championship (1 time) – with Chris Sabin
- Great Lakes Wrestling
  - GLW Cruiserweight Championship (1 time)
- IndependentWrestling.tv
  - IWTV Independent Wrestling World Championship (1 time)
- Insane Wrestling Federation
  - IWF Cruiserweight Championship (1 time)
- Maryland Championship Wrestling
  - MCW Cruiserweight Championship (1 time)
- New Japan Pro-Wrestling
  - IWGP Junior Heavyweight Tag Team Championship (3 times) – with Chris Sabin (1) and Kushida (2)
  - Strong Openweight Tag Team Championship (1 time) – with Chris Sabin
  - Super Jr. Tag Tournament (2012) – with Kushida
- NWA Midwest
  - NWA Midwest X Division Championship (1 time)
- Ontario Championship Wrestling
  - OCW Tag Team Championship (1 time) – with R.C. Cross
- Prestige Wrestling
  - Prestige Championship (2 times)
- Pro Wrestling Illustrated
  - Tag Team of the Year (2010) – with Chris Sabin
  - Ranked No. 23 of the top 500 singles wrestlers in the PWI 500 in 2024
- Pro Wrestling Zero1-Max
  - NWA International Lightweight Tag Team Championship (1 time) – with Chris Sabin
  - Zero1-Max United States Openweight Championship (1 time)
- Ring of Honor
  - ROH World Tag Team Championship (1 time) – with Chris Sabin
  - Trios Tournament (2006) – with Abyss and Jimmy Rave
- Sanctuary Fight Club
  - SFC Thrash Zone Championship (1 time)
- Smash Wrestling
  - Smash Wrestling Championship (1 time)
- The Wrestling Revolver
  - Revolver World Championship (1 time)
  - Revolver Remix Championship (1 time)
- Total Nonstop Action Wrestling/Impact Wrestling
  - TNA/Impact World Championship (1 time)
  - TNA X Division Championship (1 time)
  - Impact/TNA World Tag Team Championship (3 times) – with Chris Sabin
  - Chris Candido Memorial Tag Team Tournament – with Sean Waltman
  - Gauntlet for the Gold (2008 – Tag Team) – with Chris Sabin
  - TNA X Division Championship Tournament (2009)
  - TNA World X Cup (2006) – with Chris Sabin, Jay Lethal, and Sonjay Dutt
  - Impact/TNA Year End Awards (4 times)
    - Tag Team of the Year (2007) with Chris Sabin
    - Moment of the Year (2020) – Motor City Machine Guns' return to Impact at Slammiversary, shared with the other returns and debuts that night
    - Men's Tag Team of the Year (2022) with Chris Sabin
    - Male Wrestler of the Year (2023)
  - Tenth Triple Crown Champion
- UWA Hardcore Wrestling
  - UWA Lightweight Championship (2 times)
- WWE
  - WWE Tag Team Championship (1 time) – with Chris Sabin
  - WWE Tag Team Championship #1 Contender Tournament (2024) – with Chris Sabin
  - WWE Tag Team Championship #1 Contender Tournament (2025) – with Chris Sabin
- Westside Xtreme Wrestling
  - wXw World Heavyweight Championship (2 times)
- Xtreme Intense Championship Wrestling
  - XICW Cruiserweight Championship (1 time)
  - XICW Midwest Heavyweight Championship (1 time)
  - XICW Tag Team Championship (3 times) – with Jaimy Coxxx
