= Mance Warner =

American professional wrestler (born 1988)

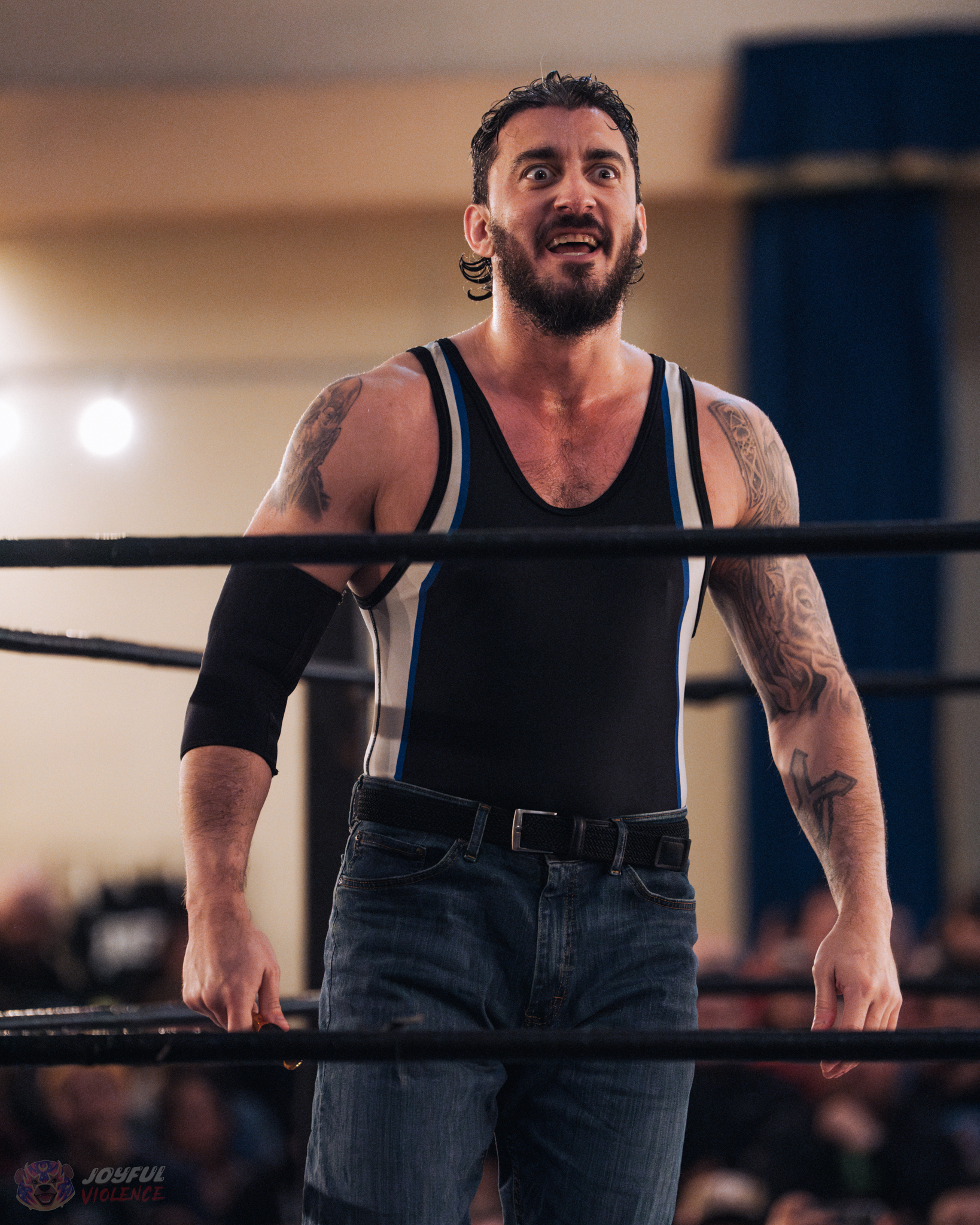
- Warner in February 2024

Personal information
- Born: Quirt Miller; October 10, 1988 (age 38) Bucksnort, Tennessee, U.S.
- Spouse: Steph De Lander (m. 2025)

Professional wrestling career
- Ring name(s): Mance Warner; Good Brother #3
- Billed height: 6 ft 1 in (1.85 m)
- Billed weight: 215 lb (98 kg)
- Billed from: Bucksnort, Tennessee
- Trained by: Billy Roc
- Debut: October 4, 2015

Quirt Miller (born October 10, 1988), better known by his ring name Mance Warner, is an American professional wrestler. He performs on the independent circuit and also makes appearances for Ring of Honor (ROH).

He has previously competed in Combat Zone Wrestling (CZW), where he is a former CZW World Heavyweight Champion, and IWA Mid-South, where he has held both the IWA Mid-South Heavyweight Championship and Tag Team Championship. Warner is also a former AAW Heavyweight Champion, with his run being the longest in company history.

== Professional wrestling career ==
=== Early career ===
Warner debuted in professional wrestling in 2015, at age 27. He trained under Billy Roc, a former pupil of Dory Funk Jr. and initially wrestled notably for Georgia's Atlanta Wrestling Entertainment and Indiana's SmashMouth Pro Wrestling (SPW).

=== Independent circuit (2016–2018) ===
The following year, he began touring throughout the Midwest and worked with promotions including Ohio's Rockstar Pro, Indiana's Pro Wrestling King and EMERGE Wrestling, and West Virginia's Vicious Outcast Wrestling. He first gained national notoriety that same year as part of IWA Mid South.

He captured his first major independent championship in 2017 by winning the IWA Mid-South Tag Team Championship with partner Zodiak and soon thereafter began wrestling for promotions such as Absolute Intense Wrestling, Black Label Pro, and Combat Zone Wrestling. Throughout 2018, he competed regularly for CZW and AIW as well as IWA Mid-South (capturing the promotion's tag team titles for a second time) All American Wrestling, Freelance Wrestling and Glory Pro. During this time, he faced wrestlers including Matt Riddle, Michael Elgin and Jimmy Jacobs. At the end of 2018, he recorded the biggest win of his career, defeating Rickey Shane Page for the CZW World Heavyweight Championship at CZW Cage of Death XX.

=== Major League Wrestling (2019–2021) ===
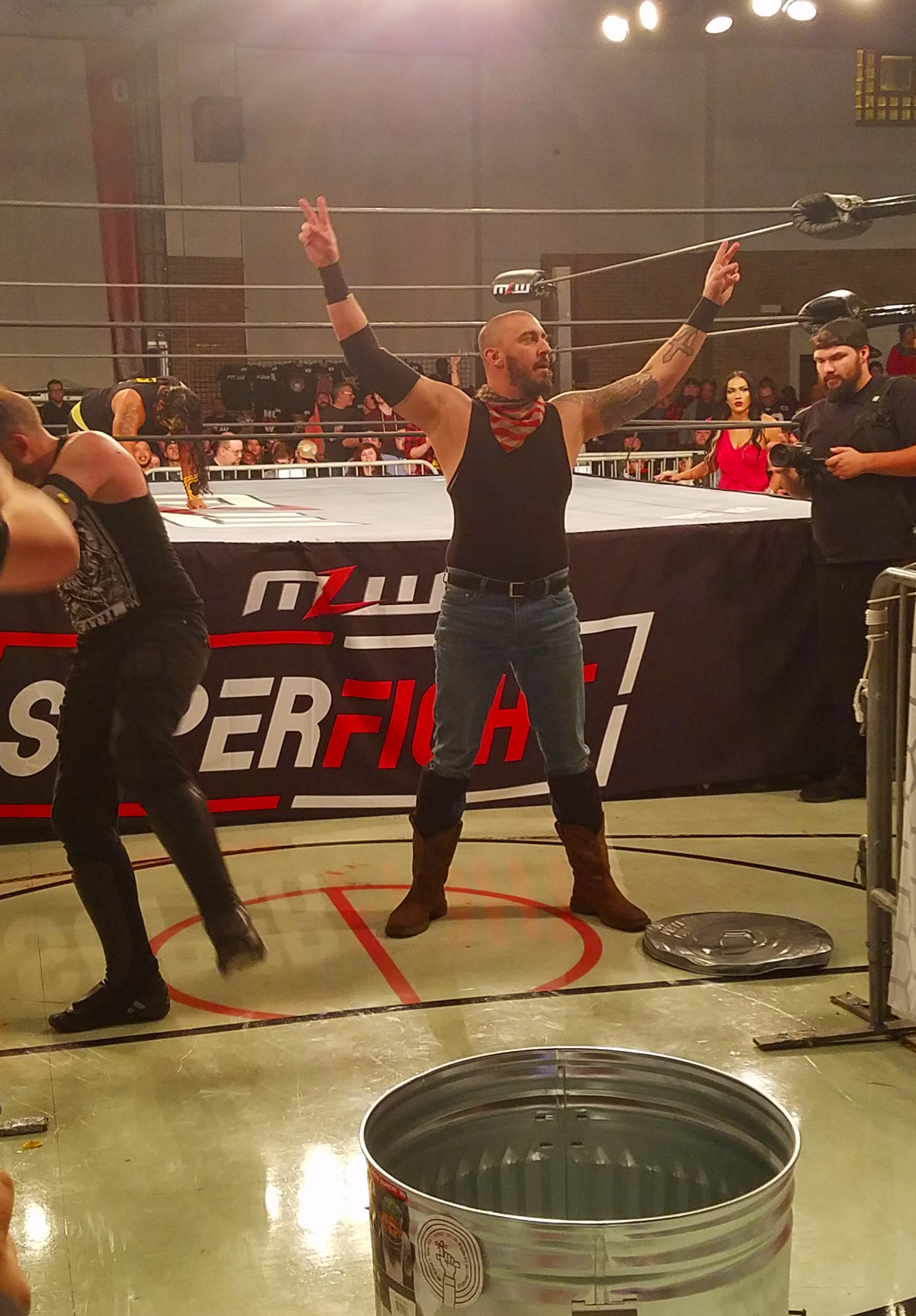
Warner plays to the crowd during his Stairway to Hell match at Saturday Night SuperFight.

In 2019, Warner made his national television debut by signing with Major League Wrestling. His debut match was against Jimmy Yuta. On March 2, 2019, at Intimidation Games, Warner was defeated by L. A. Park. At Saturday Night SuperFight, he defeated Jimmy Havoc and Bestia 666 in a Stairway to Hell" match in which a bale of barbed wire was suspended above the ring.

Warner was released by MLW in October 2021.

=== Return to the independent circuit (2022–present) ===
On July 31, 2022, members of the Game Changer Wrestling roster invaded the Bunkhouse Battle Royal during the pre-show of Ric Flair's Last Match. He won the Bunkhouse Battle Royal, by last eliminating Bully Ray.

=== All Elite Wrestling (2022) ===
On August 3, 2022, Warner made his All Elite Wrestling debut on an episode of Dark: Elevation, defeating Serpentico. Warner had an Interim World Title Eliminator match later that week on Rampage against Interim AEW World Champion Jon Moxley, which he lost by referee's decision.

=== Return to Major League Wrestling (2022–2024) ===
On August 31, 2022, Major League Wrestling announced that Warner had returned to the company. On November 18, 2023, at Fightland, Warner lost a Loser Leaves MLW match to Matt Cardona and as a result, he left MLW. He would later return to MLW as part of The Second Gear Crew under the name Good Brother #3.

=== Total Nonstop Action Wrestling (2025–2026) ===
For weeks, a vignette aired showing the numbers 23. On the January 23, 2025 live episode of Impact!, new TNA Digital Media Champion Steph De Lander told Sami Callihan that she had divorced from PCO. Warner then made his TNA debut by attacking Callihan, before kissing De Lander, who is his real-life fiancée. On March 4, 2026, it was reported that both Warner and De Lander had left TNA due to the promotion refusing to medically clear De Lander.

== Personal life ==
Miller is married to fellow professional wrestler Steph De Lander. The couple wed in October 2025.

== Championships and accomplishments ==
- AAW Wrestling
  - AAW Heavyweight Championship (1 time)
  - Jim Lynam Memorial Tournament (2023)
- Victory Ring
  - Victory Ring Championship (1 time, current)
- Bizzaro Lucha
  - Bizzaro Lucha Luchaversal Championship (1 time)
- Combat Zone Wrestling
  - CZW World Heavyweight Championship (1 time)
- DEFY Wrestling
  - DEFY Tag Team Championship (1 time) – with Matthew Justice
- EMERGE Wrestling
  - EMERGE Tag Team Championship (1 time) – with Matthew Justice
- Game Changer Wrestling
  - GCW World Championship (1 time)
  - GCW Tag Team Championship (1 time) – with Matthew Justice
  - WOMBAT Tag Team Championship (1 time) – with 1 Called Manders
  - Nick Gage Invitational 5 (2020)
  - Clusterfuck Battle Royal (2022 - with AJ Gray & Matthew Justice)
- Horror Slam Wrestling
  - Horror Slam Tag Team Championship (1 time) – with Matthew Justice
- IWA Mid South
  - IWA Mid-South Heavyweight Championship (2 times)
  - IWA Mid-South Tag Team Championship (1 time) – with Zodiak
  - IWA World Title Tournament (2018)
- IndependentWrestling.TV
  - Undisputed IWTV Independent Wrestling World Championship (1 time, current)
- Jim Crockett Promotions
  - Bunkhouse Battle Royal (2022)
- Next Generation Wrestling
  - NGW Tennessee Legend Championship (1 time, current)
- Pro Wrestling Illustrated
  - Ranked No. 50 of the top 500 singles wrestlers in the PWI 500 in 2025
- Pro Wrestling King
  - PWK Tag Team Championship (1 time) – with Luke Lawson
- Unsanctioned Pro
  - Unsanctioned Pro Hardcore Championship (1 time)
- The Wrestling Revolver
  - Revolver World Championship (1 time)
  - Revolver World Tag Team Championship (1 time) – with Matthew Justice and 1 Called Manders
