= Revolver World Championship =

Professional wrestling championship

- The current Revolver World Championship belt design

Details
- Promotion: The Wrestling Revolver
- Date established: October 23, 2018
- Current champion: Damian Chambers
- Date won: August 15, 2026

Other names
- Revolver Championship (2018–2021); Revolver World Championship (2021–present)
Statistics
- First champion: Matthew Palmer
- Most reigns: 2 reigns: Matthew Palmer; JT Dunn
- Longest reign: Matthew Palmer (2nd reign, 621 days)
- Shortest reign: Trey Miguel (<1 day)
- Oldest champion: Krule (41 years, 167 days)
- Youngest champion: Chris Bey (26 years, 103 days)
- Heaviest champion: Larry D (332 lb (151 kg))
- Lightest champion: Rich Swann (169 lb (77 kg))

The Revolver World Championship is a professional wrestling world championship created and promoted by The Wrestling Revolver. Established on October 23, 2018, the title was originally called the Revolver Championship before it was later renamed to the Revolver World Championship. The current champion is Damian Chambers, who is in his first reign. He won the title by defeating Mance Warner in a Cage of Horrors match at Cage of Horrors on August 15, 2026.

== History ==
On October 23, 2018, The Wrestling Revolver announced the Revolver Championship, a professional wrestling world championship. A day later, Revolver announced a one-night tournament to crown the inaugural champion at Holiday Hangover on December 28. The tournament featured nine wrestlers. Most of the matches in the first round were singles matches, except for one three-way match. All of the winners of the first-round matches competed in a four-way match in the tournament final. The tournament was won by Matthew Palmer, who became the inaugural champion by defeating Larry D, Shane Strickland, and Trey Miguel in the tournament final. On October 30, 2021, the title was renamed to the Revolver World Championship.

=== Inaugural tournament ===
Inaugural Revolver Championship Tournament – Winner: Matthew Palmer

First round Holiday Hangover; December 28, 2018
Jessicka Havok
Matthew Palmer	Disqualification
Larry D	Win
Rich Swann
Shane Strickland	Win
Tommy Dreamer
Trey Miguel	Win
Ace Austin Clayton Gainz	—

Final; Holiday Hangover; December 28, 2018
Matthew Palmer	Win
Larry D
Shane Strickland	—
Trey Miguel	—

== Reigns ==
As of November 18, 2026, there have been 17 reigns among 15 different champions with one vacancy. Matthew Palmer was the inaugural champion. Palmer and JT Dunn are tied for the most reigns at two. Palmer's second reign is the longest reign in the title's history at 621 days, while Trey Miguel has the shortest reign at less than one day. The oldest champion is Krule, who won the title at 41 years and 167 days old, while the youngest champion is Chris Bey, who won the title at 26 years and 103 days old.

Damian Chambers is the current champion in his first reign. He won the title by defeating Mance Warner in a Cage of Horrors match at Cage of Horrors on August 15, 2026, in Dayton, Ohio.

Key
No.	Overall reign number
Reign	Reign number for the specific champion
Days	Number of days held

No.	Champion	Championship change			Reign statistics		Notes	Ref.
No.	Champion	Date	Event	Location	Reign	Days	Notes	Ref.
1	Matthew Palmer	December 28, 2018	Holiday Hangover	Des Moines, IA	1	133	Defeated Larry D, Shane Strickland, and Trey Miguel in a four-way tournament final to become the inaugural champion.	
2	Larry D	May 10, 2019	3 Year Anniversary	Des Moines, IA	1	147		
3	Killer Kross	October 4, 2019	Tales from the Ring	Des Moines, IA	1	84	This was co-produced by Impact Wrestling. This three-way match also featured Madman Fulton.	
4	Matthew Palmer	December 27, 2019	The Nightmare After X-Mas	Des Moines, IA	2	621	Palmer and Evo (Jake Crist, Madman Fulton, and Sami Callihan) defeated The Revelation (Ace Austin, Jessicka Havok, JT Dunn, and Killer Kross) in a Cage of Horrors match to gain control of Wrestling Revolver. Thus, Palmer also dethroned Kross to win the title.	
—	Vacated	September 8, 2021	—	—	—	—	After Wrestling Revolver did not hold an event for over a year due to the COVID-19 lockdowns, the promotion decided to vacate the Revolver Championship and the Revolver Tag Team Championship.	
5	Rich Swann	October 30, 2021	Tales from the Ring	Clive, IA	1	168	Defeated JT Dunn, Manscout Jake Manning, and Trey Miguel in a four-way ladder match to win the vacant title.	
6	JT Dunn	April 16, 2022	Swerve's House	Clive, IA	1	41		
7	Chris Bey	May 27, 2022	Dueces Wild	Las Vegas, NV	1	1	This was co-produced by Future Stars of Wrestling. This four-way match also featured Kenny King and Rich Swann.	
8	JT Dunn	May 28, 2022	Vegas Vacation	Las Vegas, NV	2	189	This was an Anything Goes match.	
9	Trey Miguel	December 3, 2022	Season Finale	Clive, IA	1	<1		
10	Steve Maclin	December 3, 2022	Season Finale	Clive, IA	1	196	This was Maclin's Golden Ticket cash-in match.	
11	Jake Crist	June 17, 2023	Wrestling Revolver and the Ring of Destiny	Dayton, OH	1	222		
12	Alex Shelley	January 25, 2024	Mox vs. Gringo	Dayton, OH	1	149	This was a Winner Takes All 2-out-of-3 Falls match, where Shelley's Revolver Remix Championship was also on the line. Shelley won 2–1.	
13	Ace Austin	June 22, 2024	Cage of Horrors	Clive, IA	1	168		
14	Myron Reed	December 7, 2024	Season Finale	Clive, IA	1	425		
15	Krule	February 5, 2026	Kross Hour	Dayton, OH	1	79	This three-way match also featured Alan Angels, who cashed in his Golden Ticket to enter the match.	
16	Mance Warner	April 25, 2026	Revolver Strong	Dayton, OH	1	112		
17	Damian Chambers	August 15, 2026	Cage of Horrors	Dayton, OH	1	95+	This was Chambers' Golden Ticket cash-in match, which was originally a three-way Cage of Horrors match between previous champion Mance Warner, Alex Colon, and Krule, but it was converted into a four-way match after Chambers cashed-in his Golden Ticket mid-match, with Chambers pinning Colon to win the title.	

== Combined reigns ==
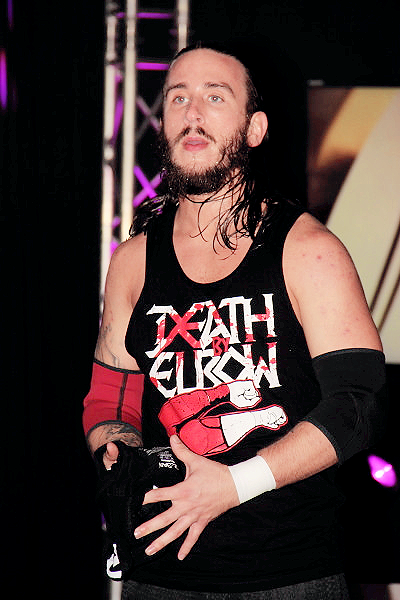
Two-time champion JT Dunn is tied with Matthew Palmer (not pictured) for the most reigns.

As of November 18, 2026.

†	Indicates the current champion

Rank	Wrestler	No. of reigns	Combined days
1	Matthew Palmer	2	754
2	Myron Reed	1	425
3	JT Dunn	2	230
4	Jake Crist	1	222
5	Steve Maclin	1	196
6	Ace Austin	1	168
6	Rich Swann	1	168
8	Alex Shelley	1	149
9	Larry D	1	147
10	Mance Warner	1	112
11	Damian Chambers †	1	95+
12	Killer Kross	1	84
13	Krule	1	79
14	Chris Bey	1	1
15	Trey Miguel	1	<1
